= List of places of worship in Horsham District =

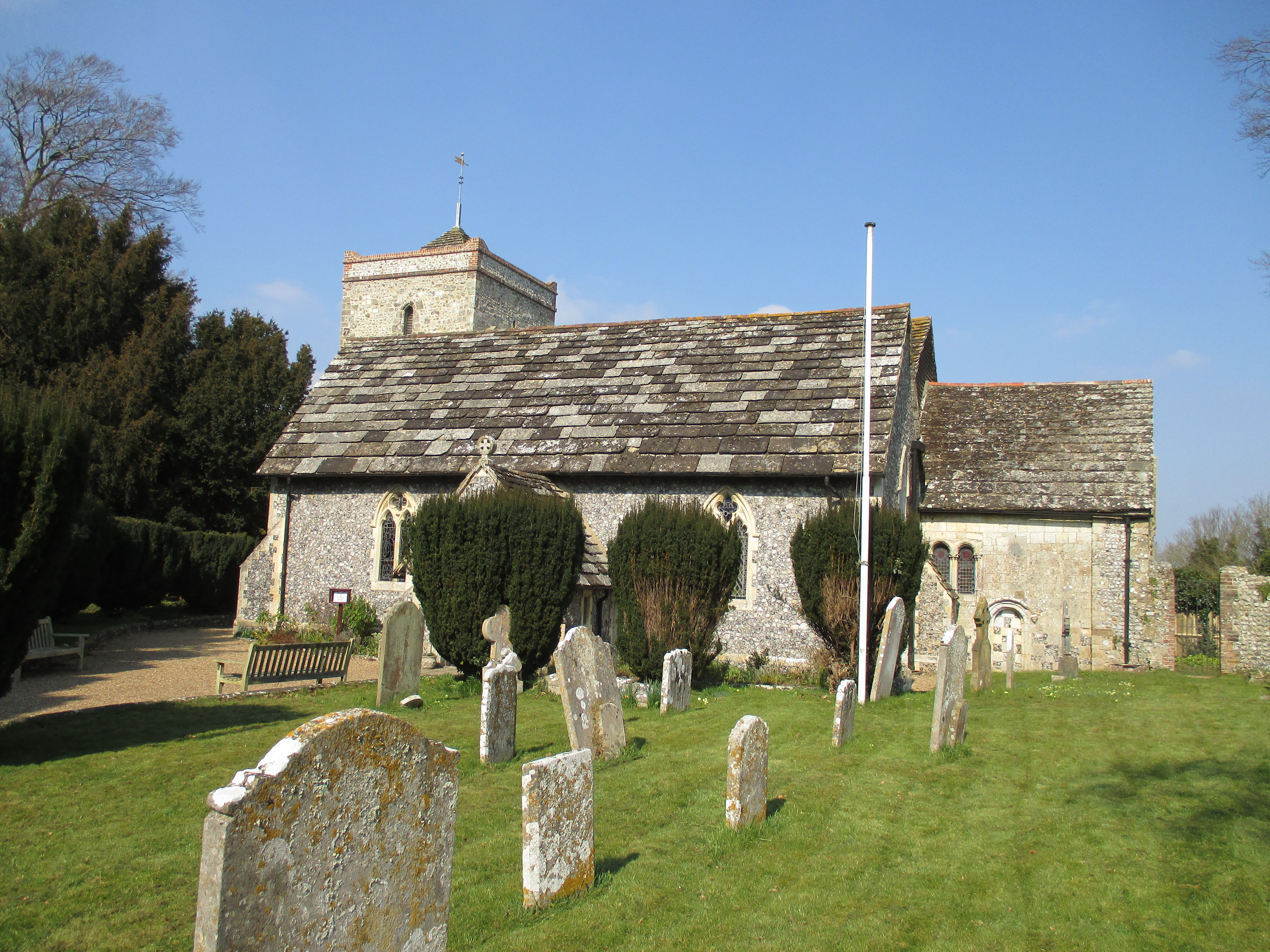
The district has many ancient churches with Anglican congregations, such as St Peter's Church at Upper Beeding—formerly linked to Sele Priory.

There are more than 110 current and former churches and other places of worship in the district of Horsham, one of seven local government districts in the English county of West Sussex. The town of Horsham, the district's administrative centre, has 88 places of worship in use as of 2026, and a further 28 closed churches and other former religious buildings which, although still standing, are no longer in religious use. The area has a long history of Christian worship, in both the main population centres (Horsham, Billingshurst, Henfield, Pulborough, Steyning and Storrington) and the surrounding villages and hamlets. Many Anglican churches are of Anglo-Saxon or Norman architecture. Roman Catholic places of worship include chapels within convents and priories, including England's only Carthusian monastery, as well as modern churches. Protestant Nonconformity has been well established since the 17th century. Plymouth Brethren are well represented in the north of the district; Baptists, Methodists and United Reformed Church worshippers have many churches; William Penn lived and preached in the area, which still has a strong Quaker presence; and one of eight chapels belonging to a now vanished local sect, the Society of Dependants, still stands at Warnham. There is also a mosque in the town of Horsham.

English Heritage has awarded listed status to nearly 50 current and former church buildings in the district of Horsham. A building is defined as "listed" when it is placed on a statutory register of buildings of "special architectural or historic interest" in accordance with the Planning (Listed Buildings and Conservation Areas) Act 1990. The Department for Culture, Media and Sport, a Government department, is responsible for this; English Heritage, a non-departmental public body, acts as an agency of the department to administer the process and advise the department on relevant issues. There are three grades of listing status: Grade I, the highest, is defined as being of "exceptional interest"; Grade II* is used for "particularly important buildings of more than special interest"; and Grade II, the lowest, is used for buildings of "special interest". As of February 2001, there were 38 buildings with Grade I status, 60 with Grade II* status and 1,628 with Grade II status in the district of Horsham.

== Overview of the district and its places of worship ==
Horsham district shown within West Sussex

Horsham is a large, mostly rural district in southeast England, which covers about 205 square miles (530 km^{2}) of land between the North and South Downs. Much of the land is part of the Weald, some is heavily forested, and large parts are classified as Areas of Outstanding Natural Beauty. More than one-third of residents live in the ancient market town of Horsham, which has grown rapidly since the 19th century to support a population of 45,000. The next largest settlements are the villages of Billingshurst, Henfield, Pulborough, Steyning and Storrington. These and many other villages and hamlets within the 32 civil parishes have ancient churches, particularly from the 13th century. Clockwise from the south, the district is bordered by the districts of Adur, Arun and Chichester in West Sussex; the borough of Waverley and the district of Mole Valley in the county of Surrey; the West Sussex borough of Crawley and district of Mid Sussex; and the city of Brighton and Hove.

The Christianisation of Sussex began with St Wilfrid in the 7th century, and gained pace in the 8th century when St Cuthman arrived at Steyning and founded St Andrew's Church. The densely forested Weald had been a stronghold of pagan worship, but by the 9th century Sussex was "at least nominally, a Christian county" due to the work of travelling missionaries such as Cuthman, who spent their lives preaching and founding places of worship.

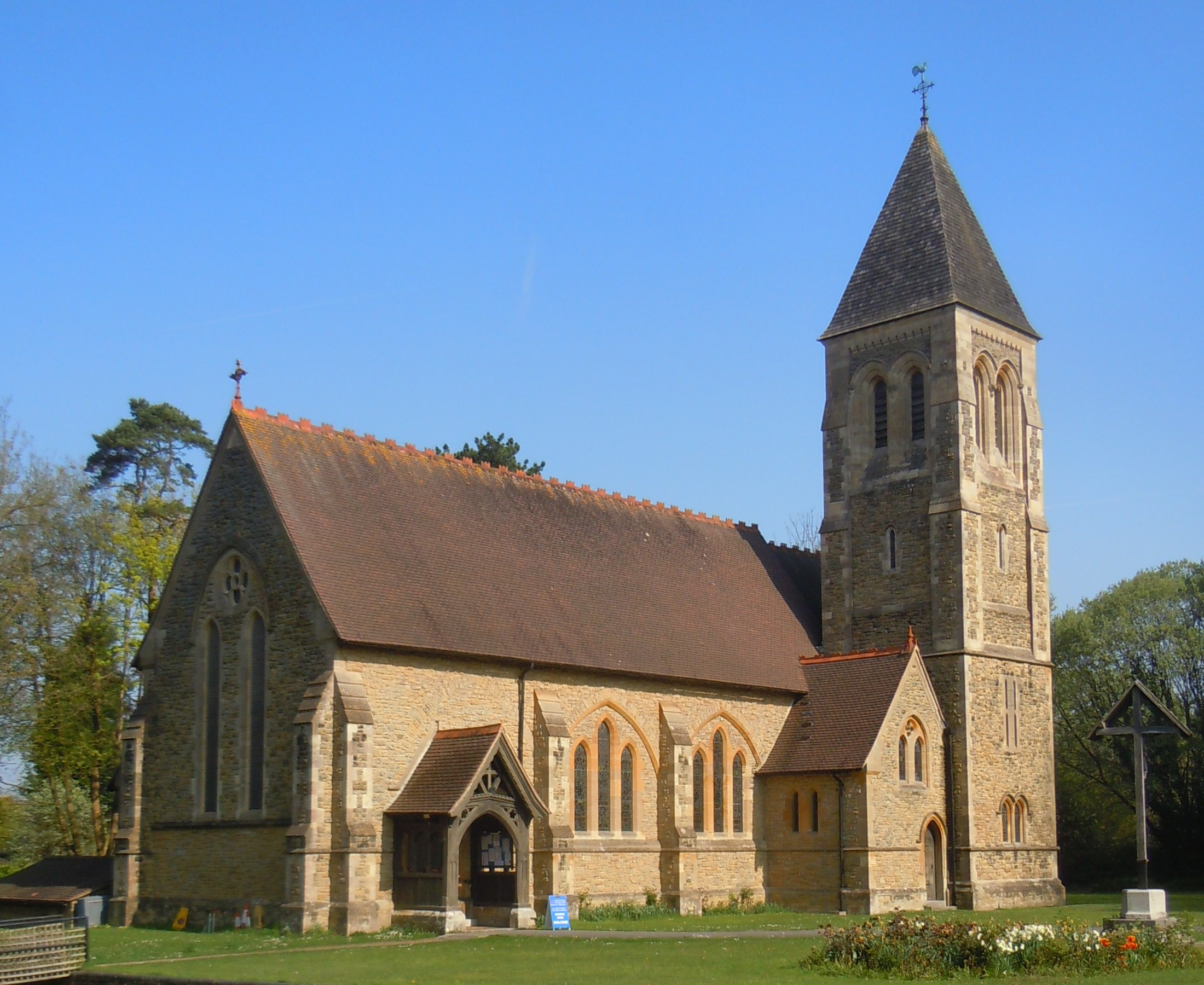
Population expansion in the 19th century led to the construction of new Anglican churches, such as at Roffey (All Saints).

In common with other parts of Sussex, many early churches were simple "two-cell" buildings with a nave and chancel. As worship became more elaborate, settlements grew larger and building techniques improved, many of these Saxon-era structures were extended or replaced, and Norman or early Gothic architecture characterises many of Horsham district's churches. Many ancient churches were restored in the Victorian era—sometimes drastically, as at Amberley, Ashington, Billingshurst and Wiston, for example—for several reasons. New theological and ideological practices within the Anglican church, associated with the Oxford Movement and the Cambridge Camden Society, defined new architectural ideals for churches to follow. Those that lacked the required features, such as large chancels, chancel screens and a separate nave, were identified for restoration, as were churches with newly unfashionable features such as box pews and galleries. In other cases, apathy and declining congregations had led to serious structural decay over the course of several centuries. Meanwhile, population growth in larger settlements necessitated enlargements or rebuildings in some cases. Gordon Macdonald Hills, who conducted "particularly damaging restorations" at more than 30 Sussex churches, was especially active in the Horsham area, but other architects such as Samuel Sanders Teulon, Henry Woodyer, John Loughborough Pearson, George Gilbert Scott, Jr. and R.H. Carpenter also left their mark on the district's old churches in the 19th century.

Roman Catholic worship in the area has had an unbroken history since before the English Reformation, despite being outlawed for centuries by various Acts of Parliament. Rich families such as the Wappingthorns at Steyning and the Carylls at West Grinstead maintained the faith, sometimes using secret rooms to celebrate Mass. Example survives in the Priest's House next to the 19th-century Church of Our Lady of Consolation and St Francis in West Grinstead, and possibly at Henfield. Mass was sometimes said in private houses (as at Henfield) before permanent churches were built, and three of the district's present Roman Catholic churches are linked to monasteries and convents. Public worship takes place in the chapels at St Hugh's Charterhouse Monastery at Parkminster and The Towers Convent in Upper Beeding, and the Priory Church of Our Lady of England in Storrington is physically linked to the Premonstratensian monastery there.

Protestant Nonconformist worship has had a long and successful history in the area. Many denominations founded chapels and meeting places between the 17th and 19th centuries, both in the towns and in rural areas; many survive and remain in use. The Wesleyan and Primitive Methodist movements were especially focused on Horsham town, but Wesleyan chapels in particular found success in rural parts of the district. Wesleyan worship at a chapel in the town's London Road dates from 1832, and outreach work to surrounding villages led to the founding of chapels in Southwater (now demolished), Dragon's Green (Shipley), Faygate, Mannings Heath and Partridge Green. The Methodist Statistical Returns published in 1947 (Note: The statistical return was compiled between 1940 and 1947 with the aim of documenting all Methodist chapels extant at that time: their location, previous affiliation prior to the Methodist Union of 1932, capacity, building materials and similar details.) recorded the existence of all of these except Southwater, which had already closed, along with chapels of Wesleyan origin further south at Steyning (still open as Steyning Methodist Church) and Ashington (closed). There was one Primitive Methodist chapel, at Roffey, which also remains open as St Andrew's Methodist Church. Earlier Primitive Methodist chapels in the town, at Rushams Road and East Street, closed prior to 1940. A chapel opened at Storrington in 1960 to serve Methodists in that area.

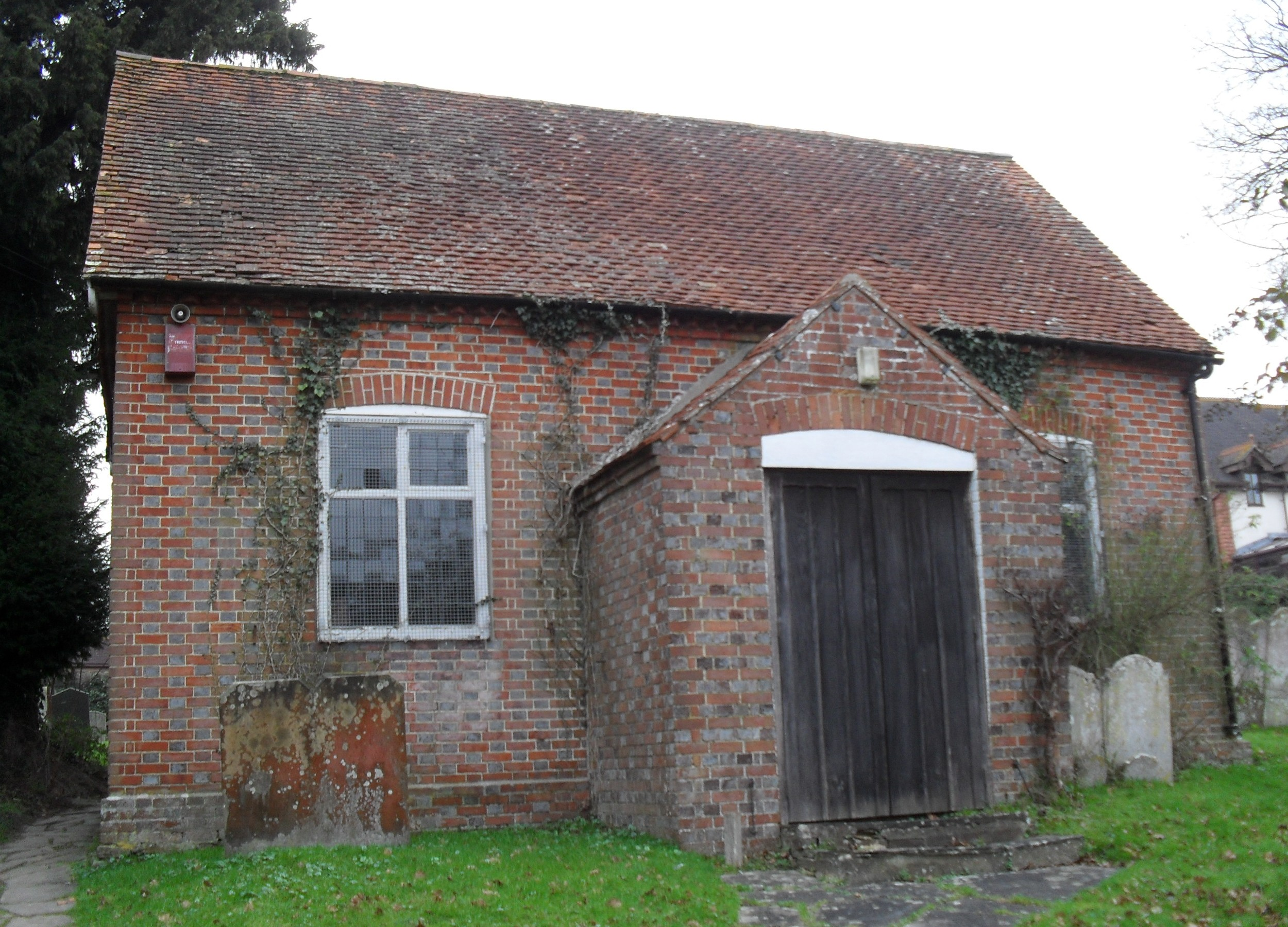
Nonconformist places of worship include Billingshurst Unitarian Chapel, founded in 1754.

Baptist worship never gained such a hold as it did in East Sussex, but Horsham town became a hotbed of the Strict and Particular Baptist cause in the 19th century, when three such chapels were founded: Hope, Rehoboth and Jireh. General Baptists became established in the 1660s under the leadership of radical evangelist Matthew Caffyn, the first leader of Horsham General Baptist Chapel (1721). Members of the chapel founded a mission at Billingshurst in 1754; both causes moved towards Unitarianism in the 19th century, and both chapels are still used. The later Brighton Road General Baptist Church also founded two offshoot chapels.

The United Reformed Church, formed by a merger of the Congregational Church and the Presbyterian Church of England in 1972, has four congregations in the district; several other chapels fell out of use while still registered as Congregational, and one at Henfield became Evangelical. The Religious Society of Friends (Quakers) had a presence in towns and villages across the district from the 17th century, despite repression. William Penn lived at Warminghurst and preached there and at a former meeting house in Steyning, now called Penn's House; he was also linked to the curiously named Blue Idol, a Quaker place of worship since 1691. Horsham Friends Meeting House dates from 1786, but the community worshipped in houses or in the open air long before that. Plymouth Brethren, meanwhile, maintain a strong presence in Horsham town. Their cause was helped by the support of Charles Eversfield of Denne Park, who founded their first meeting house in 1863. Three other meeting rooms survive in the town. The Anglican church was strongly opposed to the denomination in the 19th century, seeing it as an "irritant" locally. Other extant places of worship for Christian Scientists, The Salvation Army and Jehovah's Witnesses exist, and denominations such as Presbyterians, Mormons, Swedenborgians, Pentecostals and the obscure, localised Society of Dependants [sic] formerly worshipped in the district. The last named sect, also known as Cokelers, established eight chapels in Sussex and Surrey in the 19th century, often with co-operative shops nearby. Warnham's old chapel was used until the 1970s, as was the associated shop.

The only non-Christian place of worship in the district is a mosque, which found a permanent home in Horsham town centre only in 2008: the community used houses and industrial buildings previously. The former Jireh Independent Baptist Chapel, which passed out of religious use in the mid-20th century, became Madina Mosque after Horsham District Council granted planning permission in 2008.

== Religious affiliation ==
According to the 2021 United Kingdom census, 146,778 lived in Horsham district. Of these, 49.28% identified themselves as Christian, 0.87% were Muslim, 0.55% were Hindu, 0.4% were Buddhist, 0.19% were Jewish, 0.07% were Sikh, 0.45% followed another religion, 42.08% claimed no religious affiliation and 6.12% did not state their religion. The proportions of Christians and people who followed no religion were higher than the figures in England as a whole (46.32% and 36.67% respectively). Islam, Judaism, Hinduism, Buddhism and Sikhism had a lower following in the district than in the country overall: in 2021, 6.73% of people in England were Muslim, 1.81% were Hindu, 0.92% were Sikh, 0.48% were Jewish and 0.46% were Buddhist.

== Administration ==
All Anglican churches in Horsham district are part of the Diocese of Chichester, whose cathedral is at Chichester, and the Archdeaconry of Horsham—one of three subdivisions which make up the next highest level of administration. In turn, this archdeaconry is divided into eight deaneries. The churches at Billingshurst, Broadbridge Heath, Colgate, Coolhurst, Itchingfield, Lower Beeding, Mannings Heath, Nuthurst, Partridge Green, Roffey, Rudgwick, Rusper, Shipley, Slinfold, Southwater, Tisman's Common, Warnham and West Grinstead, and the four in Horsham town, are in the Rural Deanery of Horsham. Those at Amberley, Ashington, Ashurst, Botolphs, Bramber, Buncton, Greatham, Parham, Pulborough, Steyning, Storrington, Sullington, Thakeham, Upper Beeding, Washington, West Chiltington and Wiggonholt are part of the Rural Deanery of Storrington. Cowfold, Edburton, Henfield and Shermanbury's churches are within the Rural Deanery of Hurst. Two churches in the southwest of the district—at Coldwaltham and Hardham—are in the Rural Deanery of Petworth.

The Roman Catholic Diocese of Arundel and Brighton, whose cathedral is at Arundel, administers the district's seven Roman Catholic churches. The church at Storrington is in Cathedral Deanery. Henfield, Horsham and the churches at Billingshurst and West Grinstead, which are part of a joint parish, are part of Crawley Deanery. The churches at Steyning and Upper Beeding, which form part of a three-church parish together with St Peter's Church, Shoreham-by-Sea in Adur district, are in Worthing Deanery.

Three Baptist churches in the district are part of the South Eastern Baptist Association, which administers about 150 churches of that denomination across southeast England. Brighton Road and Trafalgar Road Baptist Churches in Horsham town are in the Association's Gatwick Network. Upper Beeding Baptist Church is in the Mid Sussex Network. Brighton Road Baptist Church in Horsham set up a daughter church in the Littlehaven area of town in 1993. The Life Community Baptist Church now meets at a school, and is also part of the South Eastern Baptist Association's Gatwick Network.

== Current places of worship ==
Current places of worship
Name	Image	Location	Denomination/ Affiliation	Grade	Notes	Refs
St Michael's Church (More images)		Amberley; 50.9090°N 0.5394°W	Anglican	I	Amberley's parish church stands next to the castle and has Norman origins: Bishop Luffa founded it in about 1100, and its windows were extended to "thumping great" proportions in the 1150s. Most of the present structure is 13th century; in particular, Bishop Ralph Neville extended the chancel in about 1230. Gordon Macdonald Hills carried out restoration in the Victorian era.	
St Peter and St Paul's Church (More images)		Ashington; 50.9314°N 0.3950°W	Anglican	II*	The church here was originally dependent on nearby Washington when founded in the 12th century. Some medieval features remain, but Robert Wheeler's "disastrous" (to Nikolaus Pevsner) restoration of 1871–72 was needed because of population growth. The flint and stone church has Perpendicular Gothic elements.	
St James's Church (More images)		Ashurst; 50.9348°N 0.3273°W	Anglican	I	Built of flint with a Horsham Stone roof in the 12th and 13th centuries, this remote church has a double nave split by an arcade. The tower has a broach spire. A very rare 18th-century vamp-horn, a bizarre musical instrument with a droning sound, survives inside: it was used to accompany the choir.	
St Mary's Church (More images)		Billingshurst; 51.0224°N 0.4507°W	Anglican	I	The west-end broach spire looms over the partly 12th-century church and the village. The tower is the oldest and architecturally best feature; much 15th-century work remains as well, but the east end has a Gothic Revival appearance because of a restoration in 1866.	
St Gabriel's Church (More images)		Billingshurst; 51.0220°N 0.4472°W	Roman Catholic	–	Prolific Roman Catholic architect Henry Bingham Towner designed this church in 1962 to replace a chapel of 1925 elsewhere in the village. It is typical of his style, and opinion ranges from "deplorable" to "interesting and satisfying". The reconstituted stone exterior leads to an aisled nave and sanctuary with a miniature tower. It was registered for worship and for marriages in June 1962.	
Billingshurst Unitarian Chapel (More images)		Billingshurst; 51.0218°N 0.4531°W	Unitarian	II	This Georgian Vernacular-style chapel has a well-preserved interior and is set back from the street in a large raised graveyard. Built of grey and red brick in 1754, it has a small porch and an interior gallery. An extension was added in 1825.	
Trinity United Reformed Church (More images)		Billingshurst; 51.0208°N 0.4530°W	United Reformed	–	A Congregational chapel known as "Gingers Chapel" was founded in 1815. This church, by Thomas Elworthy, replaced it on a different site in 1868. The Early English-style building is of red and blue brick with some stuccoed stonework.	
St Botolph's Church (More images)		Botolphs; 50.8705°N 0.3051°W	Anglican	I	Apart from a small Victorian porch, this isolated church is ancient: parts of the chancel and nave are Saxon, and there is a 13th-century blocked aisle and tower with a "Sussex cap" roof. A good Jacobean pulpit survives from the 17th century, and fragmentary wall paintings are visible.	
St Nicholas' Church (More images)		Bramber; 50.8829°N 0.3153°W	Anglican	I	William de Braose founded a chapel here, linked to his castle, in about 1073. It became the property of Saumur Abbey in France soon afterwards, and of Sele Priory later. The bulky, hollow, castellated tower is 18th century. Crude Norman-era carvings survive inside.	
St John's Church (More images)		Broadbridge Heath; 51.0713°N 0.3616°W	Anglican	–	Now part of a team ministry of five churches in the Horsham area, this church has its origins in a mission hall of 1853. A tin tabernacle replaced it in 1904, but structural problems led to its demolition in 1957. A cruciform replacement of extremely unusual design was completed in 1963.	
Brethren Meeting Room (More images)		Broadbridge Heath; 51.0713°N 0.3604°W	Plymouth Brethren Christian Church	–	This was founded as a Baptist mission chapel in 1908 by Samuel Barrow, and was associated with Brighton Road Baptist Church in its early days. By 1955 it was called Broadbridge Heath Free Church, and it was registered for worship with that name in that year and for marriages in February 1970. The building has since been acquired by the Plymouth Brethren Christian Church. The red-brick and stone chapel has lancet windows.	
All Saints Church (More images)		Buncton; 50.9133°N 0.3726°W	Anglican	I	Originally a chapel of ease to Ashington, this tiny two-cell stone building dates from the 11th or 12th century and now stands in a remote situation with few buildings nearby. Simple, "picturesque" and "delightfully unrestored", the building has many ancient internal features—but its famous feature, an extraordinary carving with exposed genitalia, was destroyed by a vandal in 2004.	
St Giles' Church (More images)		Coldwaltham; 50.9392°N 0.5448°W	Anglican	II*	A major but characterful rebuilding in 1871 replaced most features except a 13th-century arcade, the half-timbered Norman belfry and the Early English-style tower of the 14th century. The stained glass by Charles Eamer Kempe is considered to be among his best work.	
St Saviour's Church (More images)		Colgate; 51.0817°N 0.2440°W	Anglican	–	Gordon Macdonald Hills, restorer of many churches in the area, designed Colgate's parish church in 1871. It replaced a smaller building opened three years earlier as a chapel of ease to Lower Beeding. The Decorated/Perpendicular Gothic Revival yellow- and blue-brick structure has a bell turret and a reredos by F. W. Pomeroy.	
Blue Idol (More images)		Coolham; 50.9969°N 0.4233°W	Quaker	II*	Forming one section of a 17th-century timber-framed cottage in a rural setting, this Quaker meeting house was founded for William Penn in 1691. The conversion, by John Shaw, created a large single-storey room. It fell out of use in 1793, but services started again in 1837 and there have been extensions since then. The name's origins are obscure.	
St John the Evangelist's Church (More images)		Coolhurst; 51.0553°N 0.2890°W	Anglican	–	Land for a church in this wooded location was given in 1836, and the "forest church" (also known as the "Sun Oak church") was consecrated in 1839. The Early English-style stone building has a bell turret at the west end of the stone roof. Originally a chapel of ease to Lower Beeding, it was later served from Horsham.	
St Peter's Church (More images)		Cowfold; 50.9901°N 0.2738°W	Anglican	I	The "chief glory" of this substantial, largely 13th- and 15th-century church is a large floor-mounted brass memorial to Thomas Nelond, a Prior of Southover. He died in 1433, and the brass and its "enchanting", well-preserved canopy date from then. The font can be dated precisely to 1481. Restoration was carried out on the ashlar and rubble building in 1877.	
Parkminster Monastery Church (More images)		Cowfold; 50.9731°N 0.2830°W	Roman Catholic	II*	The chapel at Britain's only post-Reformation Carthusian monastery has been registered for public worship since 1943. Clovis Normand fils, a French architect, designed the French Gothic complex of buildings near Cowfold village. The large chapel lacks aisles and has an apsidal end. Stone, both foreign and local (from Hastings), are the main materials.	
St Andrew's Church (More images)		Edburton; 50.8898°N 0.2483°W	Anglican	II*	This 13th-century church was a Peculier of Canterbury until 1846. Much original detail survives despite a restoration in 1878. A north chapel and large porch were added in the 14th century, and the tower is a century newer. Eadburh of Winchester may have founded the village and its original 10th-century church.	
Greatham Church (More images)		Greatham; 50.9340°N 0.5158°W	Anglican	I	No dedication is recorded for this small church in Parham parish. The single-cell stone building has been said to resemble a haystack, as recalled by author Arthur Mee. Fittings include a good 17th-century communion rail and a Gothic pulpit. The roof, laid with slates, has a bell turret.	
St Botolph's Church (More images)		Hardham; 50.9486°N 0.5227°W	Anglican	I	Nationally famous wall paintings include the earliest mural of Saint George in a British church. Dating from the 12th century, the extensive designs were covered a century later and were found when Victorian restorers were working on the interior in 1866. The simple two-cell stone church dates from the 11th century.	
St Peter's Church (More images)		Henfield; 50.9323°N 0.2765°W	Anglican	II*	The aisles, chancel and transepts were renewed in 1870 by William Slater and R.H. Carpenter, but a side chapel and the large Perpendicular Gothic tower retain their 16th-century appearance and the chancel arch dates from the 12th century. Stained glass includes a 1901 window with Art Nouveau overtones.	
Henfield Evangelical Free Church (More images)		Henfield; 50.9311°N 0.2720°W	Evangelical	–	Originally a Congregational chapel, this has its origins in a two-bay chapel of 1832. The manse stood in front and obscured it until 1904, when it was demolished and the chapel was refronted in flint and brick. The congregation grew throughout the 20th century and aligned itself to the Evangelical movement.	
Corpus Christi Church (More images)		Henfield; 50.9312°N 0.2763°W	Roman Catholic	–	Lilian Sterns held Roman Catholic services in her house, then built a timber church in the grounds in 1929. A parish was formed out of West Grinstead's territory in 1968, and a replacement church—in red brick, and still dedicated to Corpus Christi—was provided in 1974. It was registered in September of that year. Southern England's first seminary for Catholic priests was founded in Henfield in 1889.	
St Mary's Church (More images)		Horsham; 51.0597°N 0.3309°W	Anglican	I	Reached down a quiet street lined with medieval buildings, and with open country behind, Horsham's 12th-century parish church is well situated but was given a thorough overhaul in the mid-13th century, giving it a "heavy, towny" character. S.S. Teulon's restoration of 1865 added an aisle, new windows (fitted with stained glass by various designers) and some elaborate gabling.	
Holy Trinity Church (More images)		Horsham; 51.0694°N 0.3303°W	Anglican	–	The dedication of this church may relate to the former Holy Trinity chantry, founded in 1307. A 250-capacity tin tabernacle was opened in 1879 to serve a growing suburb; when the building moved to Broadbridge Heath in 1900, William Gillbee Scott designed a Gothic Revival red-brick replacement.	
St Leonard's Church (More images)		Horsham; 51.0615°N 0.3177°W	Anglican	–	Land in east Horsham was bought in 1899, but the town-centre St Mark's Church had to be closed to provide money to establish a new church in the growing area. This eventually happened in 1936, and the red-brick St Leonard's Church was ready in 1939.	
Brighton Road Baptist Church (More images)		Horsham; 51.0603°N 0.3215°W	Baptist	–	The present chapel is the third on the site. Founded in 1896 for General Baptists in a tin tabernacle which was given a Gothic Revival brick façade, it was rebuilt in 1923 in a similar style using red brick and stonework. This was in turn demolished in 2007 and rebuilt in a Modern style in 2008.	
Hope Strict Baptist Chapel (More images)		Horsham; 51.0632°N 0.3156°W	Baptist	–	Horsham's second Strict Baptist chapel had its origins in meetings in a public hall in March 1900. The congregation moved several times, but on 2 December 1903 their new red-brick square-windowed chapel on Oakhill Road was inaugurated, and worship has continued there ever since. It was formally registered for worship the following month. The three founders were from Kent.	
Rehoboth Grace Baptist Church (More images)		Horsham; 51.0609°N 0.3212°W	Baptist	–	Particular Baptist seceders from the present Horsham Unitarian Church founded this chapel in 1834 after a period of worshipping at a farmhouse. It is a red-brick building with a gabled façade and round-headed windows. A modern frontage has been added. Hymnwriter Edward Mote was a long-serving pastor. The chapel was registered for marriages in August 1905.	
Trafalgar Road Baptist Church (More images)		Horsham; 51.0733°N 0.3297°W	Baptist	–	Brighton Road Baptist Church established a mission chapel in the rapidly growing Trafalgar Road area in the 1920s. It was formally registered for worship in June 1948 and became a separate cause, under the name Trafalgar Street Baptist Church, in 1955. The building was rebuilt in brick in 1972, but in 2011 it was demolished and a larger church erected to the design of RDJW Architects.	
First Church of Christ, Scientist, Horsham (More images)		Horsham; 51.0651°N 0.3386°W	Christian Scientist	–	This brick building on the Guildford Road was registered for worship by members of the Church of Christ, Scientist in December 1953.	
Christian Life Centre (More images)		Horsham; 51.0615°N 0.3251°W	Evangelical	–	This large Renaissance Revival brick and stone chapel on East Street was built for a Primitive Methodist congregation in 1891. It closed in 1932, and in 1957 Pentecostal worshippers moved in and renamed it Fellowship Hall, formally registering it for worship in January 1963. This continued into the 1980s, but by 2005 the present name and Evangelical character had been adopted.	
Kingdom Faith Church (More images)		Horsham; 51.0719°N 0.3137°W	Evangelical	–	This Charismatic Evangelical church is based in a building on the Foundry Lane industrial estate in Horsham. With the name National Revival Centre it was registered for worship in October 1996 and for marriages seven months later.	
Kingdom Hall (More images)		Horsham; 51.0623°N 0.3216°W	Jehovah's Witnesses	–	A Kingdom Hall was registered on the present site in Stanley Walk between 1957 and 1969, but the present brick building superseded it in August of that year. It serves the Roffey and Southwater Congregations of Jehovah's Witnesses.	
London Road Methodist Church (More images)		Horsham; 51.0647°N 0.3291°W	Methodist	–	Methodism came to Horsham in 1776, and the first Wesleyan chapel was erected in 1832 on London Road. Its 400-capacity Gothic Revival replacement, with prominent buttresses and stone dressings to its red-brick walls, opened in 1883 as a memorial to Kate Ireland, founder of the first chapel.	
Madina Mosque (More images)		Horsham; 51.0609°N 0.3231°W	Muslim	–	Horsham's Muslim population have worshipped at this former Baptist chapel since 2008 after a 14-year search for a permanent home. The stuccoed, rusticated, arch-windowed chapel was built as the Jireh Independent Chapel in 1857. The cause failed in the mid-20th century, and the building was used as a hair salon before its reversion to religious use. It was registered for marriages in December 2007.	
Appleyards Bible Church (More images)		Horsham; 51.0585°N 0.3166°W	Open Brethren	–	The building which is now Appleyards Bible Church was originally a hotel and dates from the 1930s. In 2016, the trustees of Denne Road Gospel Hall in Horsham town centre received planning permission to convert the premises into a church, and they moved from their Denne Road chapel in 2017.	
Arthur Road Meeting Room (More images)		Horsham; 51.0602°N 0.3202°W	Plymouth Brethren Christian Church	–	This stands on a road off the main Brighton Road and serves the Brethren community. It was registered for worship in April 1965.	
Horsham Friends Meeting House (More images)		Horsham; 51.0624°N 0.3339°W	Quaker	II	Quakers had a presence in Horsham from 1655, and George Fox and William Penn visited in 1680. Soon afterwards, a meeting house was founded; the 1693 building on the present Worthing Road was replaced in 1786, and the present cottage-like structure dates from then, although there have been some subsequent alterations. Its red-brick walls support a tiled hipped roof with moulded eaves.	
St John the Evangelist's Church (More images)		Horsham; 51.0641°N 0.3319°W	Roman Catholic	–	Architects E. and J. Goldie's building, a Perpendicular Gothic Revival stone and rubble church of 1919–23 with side chapels to the nave, is Horsham's third Roman Catholic church. All three stood on Springfield Road. A castellated church of 1820 was turned into a school when a new building was erected nearby in 1865. The present church was registered in January 2020.	
Salvation Army Citadel (More images)		Horsham; 51.0666°N 0.3162°W	Salvation Army	–	The present citadel was erected to replace a smaller building on Barttelot Way. It combines a community centre and worship space. It was registered for worship and for marriages in June 1995.	
Horsham Unitarian Church (More images)		Horsham; 51.0629°N 0.3334°W	Unitarian	II	This vernacular, cottage-like building was erected in 1721 for General Baptists linked to radical preacher Matthew Caffyn. The two-storey red- and blue/grey-brick chapel was later extended with a porch and an arch-windowed lean-to. The cause moved towards Unitarianism in the late 19th century.	
Horsham United Reformed Church (More images)		Horsham; 51.0639°N 0.3314°W	United Reformed	–	Slinfold Chapel is served from this former Congregational church, as was Maplehurst's former church. Meetings of Congregationalists took place from the late 18th century; they built their first church in Springfield Road in 1814. A larger Gothic Revival chapel replaced it in 1884, and the present building (again on the same site) dates from 1983 and was registered in March of that year.	
St Nicolas' Church (More images)		Itchingfield; 51.0486°N 0.3873°W	Anglican	II*	The church fabric dates from three distinct periods: the Norman era, the 15th century—when the unusual all-wood tower was built—and 1866, when Sir George Gilbert Scott added an aisle and carried out general restoration. Many windows are 12th- or 14th-century. A curious timber-framed priest's house survives under a tree in the churchyard; it is partly 15th-century.	
Brethren Meeting Room (More images)		Littlehaven, Horsham; 51.0789°N 0.3087°W	Plymouth Brethren Christian Church	–	Planning permission was granted in 1981 to erect a meeting hall for Brethren on a site off the Rusper Road in the Littlehaven area of Horsham. It was registered for worship in March 1982 and for marriages in June 1992.	
Holy Trinity Church (More images)		Lower Beeding; 51.0332°N 0.2610°W	Anglican	II	Henry Jones Underwood copied one of his earlier church designs—St Mary and St Nicholas Church at Littlemore, Oxfordshire—for his work on the new parish church at Lower Beeding. Matthew Habershon added north and south aisles with marble columns in 1864. The stone church has a west tower and is Early English Gothic Revival in style.	
Church of the Good Shepherd (More images)		Mannings Heath; 51.0447°N 0.2835°W	Anglican	–	The first church in Mannings Heath was Methodist, and it had significant influence. The incumbent at Nuthurst parish church, in whose parish the village lay, founded a red-brick Gothic Revival chapel of ease there in 1881. A local resident funded its construction. The dedication was recorded by 1895. The roof has a small bell turret.	
St Mark's Church (More images)		North Heath, Horsham; 51.0824°N 0.3155°W	Anglican	–	The dedication of the former St Mark's Church in Horsham town centre was transferred to this new church in the modern Holbrook suburb in the north of Horsham. Built in the 1980s, its design uses traditional features of churches in the Weald of Sussex—in particular its heavy broach spire.	
St Andrew's Church (More images)		Nuthurst; 51.0225°N 0.3015°W	Anglican	II	The parish of Nuthurst existed by 1207, and the first church dated from that time. "Terribly restored" (according to Pevsner) in a series of Victorian and Edwardian interventions, it was further altered by Harry Stuart Goodhart-Rendel in 1951. The sandstone building has an unusually elaborate vestry with Art Nouveau overtones, dating from 1907.	
St Peter's Church (More images)		Parham; 50.9165°N 0.4941°W	Anglican	I	The present cruciform church, next to Parham Park (an Elizabethan mansion) on the Parham Estate, is an 1820s reworking of a medieval building. A side chapel in the chancel, built in 1545, retains its original features, and an unusual lead font with inscribed stripwork and a coat of arms survives from the 14th century. The roof is of Horsham Stone.	
St Michael and All Angels Church (More images)		Partridge Green; 50.9622°N 0.3082°W	Anglican	–	Built in 1890 and now surrounded by modern housing, Habershon and Fawkner's simple and unadorned Early English Gothic Revival church replaced a tin tabernacle at nearby Jolesfield. It is served from West Grinstead, whose former vicar Rev. John Goring gave the land. A flint and stone exterior hides a red-brick interior.	
Partridge Green Methodist Church (More images)		Partridge Green; 50.9600°N 0.3031°W	Methodist	–	One of many Methodist chapels founded by members of the Horsham chapel, this simple red-brick Early English Gothic Revival building was opened in 1906. It replaced a wooden structure on the same site; the congregation had met in houses before its construction in about 1888. The architect was recorded as a Mr Tovey.	
St Mary's Church (More images)		Pulborough; 50.9588°N 0.5106°W	Anglican	I	A largely unrestored Perpendicular Gothic church of the 13th and 14th centuries, with a slightly later tower, this well-proportioned sandstone building overlooks Pulborough's west end. The chancel has a 13th-century north chapel with an arcade of two bays. The font, of Purbeck Marble, dates from the 12th century.	
Pulborough United Reformed Church (More images)		Pulborough; 50.9569°N 0.4934°W	United Reformed	–	This church, originally Congregational, replaced the former Congregational chapel at the outlying hamlet of Marehill. It dates from soon after the latter's closure in 1947 (it was registered in March 1948) and has a brick façade.	
All Saints Church (More images)		Roffey; 51.0767°N 0.2940°W	Anglican	II	Arthur Blomfield designed the parish church of this Victorian suburb of Horsham in 1878. Church provision had been considered from the 1840s, and from 1856 local Anglicans worshipped in a newly built iron school. A resident donated money and land for a permanent church to commemorate her late husband. Blomfield's Early English-style church has a tower, a single-aisle nave and local sandstone walls.	
St Andrew's Methodist Church (More images)		Roffey; 51.0740°N 0.3018°W	Methodist	–	Founded by Primitive Methodists in 1878, this 160-capacity Early English Gothic Revival chapel is built of red and blue brick with some exterior stonework. The cause thrived, and the building was improved in 1971 (the porch dates from then) and dedicated to Saint Andrew.	
Holy Trinity Church (More images)		Rudgwick; 51.0976°N 0.4434°W	Anglican	I	This mostly 14th-century church retains a medieval atmosphere and appearance despite modest Victorian restoration. An earlier, possibly 13th-century, church was completely rebuilt a century later: the aisle and tall, wide chancel date from then. Many windows are tall and have varied cusped tracery. The Sussex Marble font is 12th century.	
Rudgwick Chapel (More images)		Rudgwick; 51.0952°N 0.4448°W	Evangelical	–	Founded for a Congregational community (and registered by that group in May 1912) but now used by Evangelicals, the small original (1860) part of this chapel has red-brick walls. In the early 20th century, it was extended with a new façade which had a partly timbered gabled porch with a tiled exterior.	
St Mary Magdalene's Church (More images)		Rusper; 51.1227°N 0.2793°W	Anglican	I	Thoroughly restored in 1854 by Henry Woodyer—only the substantial 16th-century Perpendicular Gothic tower survives from earlier—this church is on the Surrey border and has more in common with a Thames Valley-area church than a Sussex one. Inside, a brass memorial with Norman French inscriptions dates from the 1370s.	
St Giles' Church (More images)		Shermanbury; 50.9562°N 0.2726°W	Anglican	II*	The dedication was first recorded in 1341, and parts of the stone building date from then. John Gratwicke's restoration of 1710 gave the church its present appearance, and the nave was extended in 1885. Charles Eamer Kempe provided some stained glass. Queen Anne's coat of arms is prominent inside.	
St Mary's Church (More images)		Shipley; 50.9843°N 0.3703°W	Anglican	I	Although John Loughborough Pearson added a vestry and an aisle in 1893, the church retains its 12th-century appearance and character—especially on the completely unrestored south side. The central tower is characteristic of early Norman churches. Its bulk is accentuated by the lack of buttresses and the short chancel. A 13th-century enamelled reliquary survives inside.	
St Peter's Church (More images)		Slinfold; 51.0727°N 0.4061°W	Anglican	II	Benjamin Ferrey's individualistic Decorated Gothic Revival stone church of 1861 lost its broach spire in 1970, but the tower retains its clock face. Gigantic capitals on the arcades in the aisles contribute to a sense of space in the interior.	
Slinfold Chapel (More images)		Slinfold; 51.0715°N 0.4055°W	United Reformed	–	This is the third chapel serving Slinfold's Congregational (now United Reformed) community. Hayes Chapel, in a cottage near the manor house, was used from 1812 until 1858, when a chapel was built on the site of the present brick and tile building. This replaced its predecessor in 1878 and was formally registered for worship in September 1891.	
Church of the Holy Innocents (More images)		Southwater; 51.0253°N 0.3585°W	Anglican	II	J.P. Harrison's "small, decent chapel" of 1850 was originally in the parish of Horsham. Sir Henry Aubrey-Fletcher, 3rd Baronet donated the land and most of the cost of construction. The stone Early English Gothic Revival building has a bell turret at the west end. A vestry was added in 1909.	
Kings House (More images)		Southwater; 51.0230°N 0.3521°W	Evangelical	–	This building was registered in January 2017.	
Brethren Meeting Room		Southwater; 51.0118°N 0.3548°W	Plymouth Brethren Christian Church	–	Planning permission was granted in early 2014 for the conversion of an agricultural building into a local meeting room for members of the Plymouth Brethren Christian Church in the Southwater area.	
St Andrew's Church (More images)		Steyning; 50.8900°N 0.3250°W	Anglican	I	Founded in bizarre circumstances by St Cuthman in the 8th century, and granted to Fécamp Abbey in the mid-11th century, the present substantial 12th-century building was identified as "the best in Sussex, and one of the best in the country" by Pevsner. The Duke of Norfolk financed rebuilding of the ruined chancel in the 18th century. Gordon Macdonald Hills carried out a poorly regarded restoration in 1863–64.	
Steyning Methodist Church (More images)		Steyning; 50.8877°N 0.3265°W	Methodist	–	The growing Methodist community in Steyning moved out of Jarvis Hall, their home since 1843, into Worthing architect James E. Lund's new Gothic Revival chapel in 1878. Work on the flint and yellow-brick building had started a year earlier. There were internal extensions and improvements in 1968 and 1979.	
Church of Christ the King (More images)		Steyning; 50.8850°N 0.3273°W	Roman Catholic	–	There was a significant Roman Catholic presence in Steyning during the 16th and 17th centuries. In recent times, Mass was celebrated in the town hall from 1948, and a former barn was turned into a permanent church in 1951. It was registered for worship in May of that year and for marriages in June 1953. Separately parished in 1968, it is now part of the three-church Parish of Our Lady Queen of Peace, Adur Valley.	
St Mary the Virgin Church (More images)		Storrington; 50.9160°N 0.4564°W	Anglican	II*	Little ancient work remains in this substantial church, which stands in a high position: only the north aisle retains 11th-century details. The plain tower and much of the body of the church date from 1750 (the old steeple had collapsed a few years earlier, damaging the roof), and in 1876 the incumbent vicar, Rev. George Faithfull, funded another restoration which included the construction of a large wall with steps up from the road to the churchyard.	
Storrington Chapel (More images)		Storrington; 50.9187°N 0.4540°W	Evangelical	–	Pastor Robert Mustow, who led Nonconformist worship in the late 19th century at nearby Cootham, founded a mission chapel in Storrington village centre in 1909. The tin tabernacle was replaced by this permanent building in 1932. The old building passed into commercial use and survived until 1970. Registrations for worship and for marriages were completed in October 1937.	
Trinity Methodist Church (More images)		Storrington; 50.9202°N 0.4456°W	Methodist	–	Methodist worship in Storrington dates from 1960. Neighbouring Sullington's parish hall was used from 1962 until 1967; in 1962 the community bought a plot of land in Sullington parish (but within the urban boundary of Storrington) to build a permanent church. This happened in 1966–67, and the new chapel was registered in June 1967. The 140-capacity church and adjoining hall are of brick.	
Priory Church of Our Lady of England (More images)		Storrington; 50.9166°N 0.4599°W	Roman Catholic	–	Edward Goldie's "fine" red brick and stone Decorated Gothic Revival church of 1902–04 was added to the side of Storrington's Premonstratensian monastery, which dates from 1888. Features include a timber bell turret, an apse and an interior gallery. Henry Fitzalan-Howard, 15th Duke of Norfolk donated the land. The church was registered in March 1905.	
St Mary's Church (More images)		Sullington; 50.9070°N 0.4392°W	Anglican	I	Saxon work survives in this remote church, situated in farmland below the South Downs. The tall, narrow nave predates the Norman Conquest, and the tower, chancel and its arch are 13th century. Survivals from the 12th century include a single window and a doorway. One window has good reticulated tracery.	
St Mary's Church (More images)		Thakeham; 50.9447°N 0.4214°W	Anglican	I	The church has Norman origins but was rebuilt in the 13th century; the details of the transepts and chancel arch suggest a date in the early part of that century. The large tower is later and Perpendicular Gothic in style, as is the ornate font. An earlier dedication was to Saints Peter and Paul.	
Kingdom Hall (More images)		Thakeham; 50.9324°N 0.4360°W	Jehovah's Witnesses	–	The land on which this Kingdom Hall stands is owned by Thakeham Parish Council by means of a charitable trust. It is used by the Pulborough Congregation of Jehovah's Witnesses, and was registered for worship and for marriages in March 1990.	
St John's Church (More images)		Tisman's Common; 51.0825°N 0.4704°W	Anglican	–	This hamlet in the parish of Rudgwick has a very small church on land donated by the owner of Exfold Wood, a cottage, in 1913. The tiny brick chapel is hidden behind another house which now occupies the site.	
St Peter's Church (More images)		Upper Beeding; 50.8874°N 0.3056°W	Anglican	II*	William de Braose, 1st Lord of Bramber founded Sele Priory in the late 11th century, and attached it to the church which had recently been built at Upper Beeding. It was thereafter used by both villagers and monks, but the two congregations were physically separated. The church was modest, and experienced alteration in the 19th century. Surviving pre-Victorian detail is mostly 13th-century.	
Upper Beeding Baptist Church (More images)		Upper Beeding; 50.8826°N 0.3046°W	Baptist	–	The present brick building by C.J. Greening dates from 1966, but Baptist worship in the village began at a farm in 1905. A tin tabernacle was erected in 1913 by Jonathan Willet; it stood in front of the new church, was registered for worship between 1916 and 1967, and was finally demolished in 1975. The present church was immediately registered in its place.	
The Towers Convent Chapel (More images)		Upper Beeding; 50.8794°N 0.2979°W	Roman Catholic	II	Nikolaus Pevsner called the dour medieval-style convent, built in 1870 as a private house, "terrifying". Its chapel, which has been open for public worship from the beginning, was built in 1929 to E.G. Geary's Decorated Gothic Revival design. It has an apsidal end and is stuccoed with stone dressings.	
St Margaret's Church (More images)		Warnham; 51.0907°N 0.3465°W	Anglican	I	Arthur Blomfield's restoration of 1885–86 left some 14th- and 16th-century detail, and the simple but substantial 16th-century tower is unaltered. Rusper Priory owned the original church on this site after William de Braose, 1st Lord of Bramber granted the advowson in the 12th century, and its Purbeck Marble font survives. The original dedication was to Saint Mary.	
St Mary's Church (More images)		Washington; 50.9044°N 0.4103°W	Anglican	II*	Gordon Macdonald Hills altered the whole church, except the Norman north aisle and the 15th-century Perpendicular Gothic tower, in 1866–67. Good-quality stencil work on the interior, by Heaton and Butler in about 1880, is now covered up. Sele Priory held the church in the 11th century.	
St Mary's Church (More images)		West Chiltington; 50.9542°N 0.4493°W	Anglican	I	Largely unrestored—except for a 12th-century doorway, poorly treated in the 19th century—this stone church has many wall paintings, 13th- and 14th-century windows and an enormous hagioscope. The nave and chancel are both aisled, and a shingle-clad bell turret with 17th-century timberwork sits on the roof. Also dating from that time is the king post ceiling.	
St George's Church (More images)		West Grinstead; 50.9737°N 0.3337°W	Anglican	I	A simple two-cell stone church topped by a visually dominant, although low, tower with a shingled "Sussex cap", West Grinstead's parish church is mostly 12th- and 13th-century but retains 11th-century blocked windows on one side of the nave. There is some 14th-century stained glass, and more by Charles Eamer Kempe in 1890 and 1892. The west-facing porch is timber-framed.	
Church of Our Lady of Consolation and St Francis (More images)		West Grinstead; 50.9778°N 0.3246°W	Roman Catholic	–	Benedictines and Jesuits maintained a Roman Catholic mission at this shrine to Our Lady during the post-Reformation centuries when such worship was illegal. A French priest, Mgr Jean-Marie Denis, founded a church next to it in 1875. Intended to be a "miniature French cathedral", the French Gothic Revival flint and ashlar building was designed by John Crawley. Hilaire Belloc worshipped here and is buried in the churchyard.	
Wiggonholt Church (More images)		Wiggonholt; 50.9406°N 0.4925°W	Anglican	I	The chancel and nave of this simple 13th-century church have no arch to separate them, and the only exterior ornamentation is a small bell turret. James Powell and Sons' stained glass of 1859 (Jesus walking on water) has an unusual, "weirdly effective colour scheme". The entrance is in a porch on the south side.	
St Peter's Church (More images)		Woodmancote; 50.9214°N 0.2498°W	Anglican	II*	Henry Woodyer's restoration of 1868 gave the church its present Victorian appearance; only the original king post ceiling and a piscina survive from the original 13th-century building, successor to the original 11th-century church. The plan consists of a chancel, aisleless nave, porch and bell turret. The 12th-century font has Sussex Marble work.	

== Former places of worship ==
Former places of worship
Name	Image	Location	Denomination/ Affiliation	Grade	Notes	Refs
Amberley United Reformed Church (More images)		Amberley; 50.9087°N 0.5371°W	United Reformed	–	This chapel, originally Congregational, closed in 1977 or 1978 after more than a century of religious use. The Early English Gothic Revival building, of stone with dressings of red brick, has passed into commercial use. It was registered for marriages in January 1926.	
Ashington Methodist Church (More images)		Ashington; 50.9342°N 0.3896°W	Methodist	–	Centrally located in Ashington village and opened in 1894, this church—latterly part of the Downs Section of the Worthing Methodist Circuit, along with the Storrington and Steyning chapels—closed in October 2010. It has lancet windows with y-tracery and is built of flint and red brick. It was registered for worship in December 1894 and for marriages in February 1956.	
Barns Green Chapel (More images)		Barns Green; 51.0303°N 0.3963°W	Congregational	–	Members of the Congregational church in Horsham founded a mission chapel in this village in Itchingfield parish in 1865, and the present building was erected in 1912–13. The simple brick structure became a house after its closure in 1982. Its registrations for worship and marriage, granted in February 1929, was cancelled in February 1983.	
St Mary's Mission Chapel (More images)		Coolham; 50.9939°N 0.4052°W	Anglican	–	This chapel of ease to St Mary's Church at Shipley was opened in 1898 to serve the villagers of Coolham, which was in Shipley parish. It closed in 1974 and was sold for residential conversion in 1977.	
Cootham Mission Church (More images)		Cootham; 50.9202°N 0.4745°W	Anglican	–	Concerned by the rise in Nonconformism in Cootham, neighbouring Storrington's vicar commissioned architects Giles and Gave to design and build a mission chapel for the village. Services were held between 1875 and 1904 and again in the 1940s. The red-brick building, with an apse, lancet windows and a flèche, has been used as the village hall at other times.	
Pastor Mustow's Mission Hall		Cootham; 50.9192°N 0.4743°W	Independent	–	Nonconformist worship in Cootham was led by Pastor Robert Mustow, who converted Cootham Cottage into a chapel and Sunday school. A second chapel (now demolished) was built in Storrington in 1909, but services stopped in the 1920s and the cottage reverted to residential use.	
Crabtree Bethel Chapel		Crabtree; 51.0139°N 0.2598°W	Baptist	–	This hamlet in the parish of Lower Beeding was given a Particular Baptist chapel in 1835. It was used for worship until about 1896, and also served as a school.	
Shipley Wesleyan Methodist Chapel (More images)		Dragon's Green; 50.9999°N 0.3785°W	Methodist	–	Wesleyan Methodists from London Road Methodist Church in Horsham founded a chapel to serve Shipley and surrounding areas in the hamlet of Dragon's Green in 1880. Religious worship ceased in 1951 and the building was sold in 1953 for use as a Scout hut.	
St Francis' Church (More images)		Faygate; 51.0933°N 0.2624°W	Methodist/Anglican	–	The trustees of Horsham's Methodist church founded this 100-capacity brick chapel in 1885, and local builder T. Denny erected it. Registered for Methodist worship in 1904, it was then shared with Anglicans from the 1930s, and when Methodist congregations became negligible in the 1960s the building was sold to the Diocese of Chichester, thereafter becoming the Anglican church of St Francis. It closed in 1979 and was converted into a house.	
Rehoboth Strict Baptist Chapel		Henfield; 50.9281°N 0.2753°W	Baptist	–	Another corrugated iron former chapel was moved to Henfield from nearby Blackstone. Despite "many vicissitudes" and the lack of a permanent minister, it served Strict Baptists from 1897 until 1990, when it was sold after congregations declined. It was formally registered in July 1937.	
Nep Town Mission Chapel (More images)		Henfield; 50.9281°N 0.2781°W	Congregational	–	This small corrugated iron building, facing Nep Town Road in the Nep Town area of Henfield village, was associated with the Congregationalist cause when it was founded. In 1940 it joined the present Henfield Evangelical Free Church—itself a Congregational church at the time—and has since become a carpentry shop.	
St Mark's Church (More images)		Horsham; 51.0630°N 0.3258°W	Anglican	–	Horsham's second church, after the ancient St Mary's parish church, was erected on land donated by Thomas Coppard in 1841. William Moseley's Early English-style building was replaced by William Habershon and Edgar Brock's stone church in 1870. It was extended in 1888, closed in the 1930s and reopened briefly in 1948 before its final closure. The spire and tower survive, but most of the building was demolished in 1989 for office development by Royal & Sun Alliance.	
Denne Road Gospel Hall (More images)		Horsham; 51.0611°N 0.3273°W	Evangelical	–	Charles Eversfield funded a new Plymouth Brethren chapel near his Denne Park home in 1863; it replaced earlier short-lived meeting houses elsewhere in Horsham. The stuccoed façade has a porch below an arched window. Eversfield's influence was significant—Brethren have always had a strong presence in this part of Sussex—but the congregation later adopted Evangelical beliefs. The chapel, which had been registered in August 1925, closed in 2017 when the church acquired a building elsewhere in Horsham and moved there (the present Appleyards Bible Church).	
Railway Mission Hall (More images)		Horsham; 51.0640°N 0.3170°W	Non-denominational	–	Horsham's branch of the non-denominational Railway Mission opened in 1896 in the Oakhill area of the town. It thrived for more than 100 years, passing from the Mission to a congregation associated with the Old Baptist Union in 1937 and being re-registered accordingly; but it closed at the end of the 20th century and is now in commercial use.	
Salvation Army Citadel (More images)		Horsham; 51.0624°N 0.3244°W	Salvation Army	–	This building replaced the original Salvation Army place of worship on Springfield Road in 1969. The original citadel, formerly the town's National school, dated from 1887. Religious and social activities moved to a new citadel elsewhere in the town in 1995, and the registrations for worship and for marriages (granted in November 1970) were cancelled at that time.	
Mannings Heath Methodist Chapel (More images)		Mannings Heath; 51.0467°N 0.2817°W	Methodist	–	This red-brick Gothic Revival chapel was in use between 1869 and 1973, and replaced an 1832 building which was Mannings Heath's first place of worship: the Anglican church was founded later. The trustees of London Road Methodist Church in Horsham established the original chapel. It was not formally registered for worship until August 1937.	
Maplehurst Congregational Mission Room (More images)		Maplehurst; 51.0131°N 0.3035°W	United Reformed	–	Horsham Congregational Church founded this wayside red- and yellow-brick building as a Congregational chapel in the early 1890s, and it was registered for worship in November 1893. Services had started a few years earlier in a small room in the village. It joined the United Reformed Church when that denomination was formed in 1972, but declining use led to its closure soon afterwards.	
Providence Congregational Chapel (More images)		Marehill; 50.9554°N 0.4868°W	Congregational	–	Serving the east end of Pulborough, this stuccoed Classical-style building with arched windows was erected in 1845 for the Congregational community. It became redundant after a new church was opened in the centre of Pulborough, and was sold in 1947 for conversion into a shop. The building was refronted in 2002. It was formally registered for worship and for marriages between April 1906 and April 1948.	
St Mary the Virgin's Church (More images)		North Stoke; 50.8874°N 0.5514°W	Anglican	I	The dedication of this unrestored, partly 11th-century church was rediscovered in 2007 after it was lost centuries earlier. Worship ceased in 1992, and the cruciform stone building was placed in the care of the Churches Conservation Trust. The transepts have excellent windows and date from about 1290, and medieval carvings abound.	
St Crispin and St Crispinian's Church (More images)		Pulborough; 50.9598°N 0.5117°W	Roman Catholic	–	This church was dedicated to the twin saints Crispin and Crispinian and was, until its closure, administered as part of a joint parish with St Gabriel's Church at Billingshurst. Registered in October 1956, it was used for worship until 2019 and was then put up for sale.	
Jarvis Hall (More images)		Steyning; 50.8872°N 0.3251°W	Plymouth Brethren	II	Now in residential use, this Nonconformist chapel has housed four different congregations since its construction in 1835. Rev. Edward Lambert of Brighton founded it for the Countess of Huntingdon's Connexion, but the cause soon failed and Wesleyan Methodists bought it in 1843. The Salvation Army used it for a time, then between 1907 and 1987 Plymouth Brethren worshipped there. The simple Neoclassical building has a stuccoed façade, four large pilasters, arched windows and a pediment. The Methodist congregation moved into the new Steyning Methodist Church in 1878.	
Penn's House (More images)		Steyning; 50.8918°N 0.3323°W	Quaker	II	This 17th-century timber-framed brick and stone cottage became a Quaker meeting house in 1678 after a community developed there. William Penn preached there in 1695, and the house remained in Quaker ownership thereafter—although it passed out of and back into religious use several times. Services were briefly held as recently as the 1960s.	
Former Chapel at Toat Farm	(Note: This is on private land and is inaccessible.)	Toat Farm, Pulborough; 50.9869°N 0.5102°W	(Unknown)	II	Now a farm building, this 18th-century ashlar-built room was apparently founded as a chapel. Round-arched windows and a tiled roof survive, and there is a font inside.	
Church of the Holy Sepulchre (More images)		Warminghurst; 50.9403°N 0.4114°W	Anglican	I	This 13th-century church, declared redundant in 1979 after an initial temporary closure in the 1920s, stands in a thinly populated part of Ashington parish on the site of an 11th-century predecessor. It belonged to St Andrew's Church in Steyning for many years, after a period of annexation to Fécamp Abbey. The simple single-cell building has sandstone walls, a tiled roof with a spire-topped bell turret and some Decorated Gothic windows.	
Dependants Chapel (More images)		Warnham; 51.0864°N 0.3593°W	Society of Dependants	–	The Society of Dependants [sic], also known as Cokelers, were a tiny sect of Protestant Dissenters with links to Arminianism, founded by John Sirgood and based mainly in West Sussex and Surrey. One of their chapels was founded in 1874 at Warnham. The arch-windowed red-brick building remained in use until 1976, when a declining congregation resulted in the building's sale and residential conversion.	
Watersfield Baptist Chapel (More images)		Watersfield; 50.9333°N 0.5581°W	Baptist	–	This building has been converted into a house and has been altered. It dates from 1901 and was built of stone and red brick with round-arched windows and bargeboards to the gables. It was registered for worship between November 1902 and May 1964.	
Watersfield United Reformed Church (More images)		Watersfield; 50.9323°N 0.5580°W	United Reformed	–	This red-brick chapel and its graveyard survive intact despite being disused and neglected. The building, which has round-arched windows, was erected in 1823, although it was not formally registered until September 1950.	
St Mary's Church (More images)		Wiston; 50.8995°N 0.3584°W	Anglican	II*	Gordon Macdonald Hills's restoration of 1862 was criticised by Pevsner, who noted that its original appearance was largely 14th-century—although a church stood on the remote site in the 11th century. Memorials include one to Thomas Shirley of Wiston House, which is now the only nearby building. Use of the church declined after the population shifted northwards from the 19th century, and the church was declared redundant in 2007.	

== See also ==
- Grade I listed buildings in West Sussex
- List of demolished places of worship in West Sussex

== Bibliography ==
- Beevers, David; Marks, Richard; Roles, John (1989). Sussex Churches and Chapels. Brighton: The Royal Pavilion, Art Gallery and Museums. ISBN 0-948723-11-4.
- Carreck, Marjorie; Barwick, Alan (2002). Henfield: a Sussex Village. Chichester: Phillimore & Co. Ltd. ISBN 1-86077-210-2.
- Chambers, Ralph (1953). The Strict Baptist Chapels of England: Sussex. Vol. 2. Thornton Heath: Ralph Chambers.
- Collins, Sophie (2007). A Sussex Miscellany. Alfriston: Snake River Press. ISBN 978-1-906022-08-2.
- Coppin, Paul (2006). 101 Medieval Churches of West Sussex. Seaford: S.B. Publications. ISBN 1-85770-306-5.
- Elleray, D. Robert (1981). The Victorian Churches of Sussex. Chichester: Phillimore & Co. Ltd. ISBN 0-85033-378-4.
- Elleray, D. Robert (2004). Sussex Places of Worship. Worthing: Optimus Books. ISBN 0-9533132-7-1.
- Facey, Roy A., ed. (1981). International Church Index (Doctrinal). Index Publications. ISBN 0-907578-00-4.
- Haines, Susan (2005). Horsham – a History. Chichester: Phillimore & Co. Ltd. ISBN 1-86077-332-X.
- Ham, Joan (1982). Storrington in Living Memory. Chichester: Phillimore & Co. Ltd. ISBN 0-85033-454-3.
- Harris, Roland B. (October 2004). Horsham Historic Character Assessment Report. Sussex Extensive Urban Survey (EUS) (1st ed.). East Sussex County Council, West Sussex County Council and Brighton and Hove City Council.
- Homan, Roger (1997). "Mission and Fission: the organization of Huntingtonian and Calvinistic Baptist causes in Sussex in the 18th and 19th centuries". Sussex Archaeological Collections. 135. Lewes: Sussex Archaeological Society: 265–282. doi:10.5284/1085045. ISSN 0143-8204.
- Hughes, Annabelle (2000). A History of North Horsham Parish – to Celebrate the Millennium. Horsham: North Horsham Parish Council.
- Methodist Church of Great Britain (1947). Methodist Church Buildings: Statistical Returns including Seating Accommodation as at July 1st, 1940 (PDF). Manchester: The Department for Chapel Affairs. (Available online in 14 parts; Guide to abbreviations on page 6)
- Nairn, Ian; Pevsner, Nikolaus (1965). The Buildings of England: Sussex. Harmondsworth: Penguin Books. ISBN 0-14-071028-0.
- Salter, Mike (2000). The Old Parish Churches of Sussex. Malvern: Folly Publications. ISBN 1-871731-40-2.
- Stell, Christopher (2002). Nonconformist Chapels and Meeting-houses in Eastern England. Swindon: English Heritage. ISBN 1-873592-50-7.
- London Road Methodist Church Horsham 1832–2007: The Story So Far. Horsham: London Road Methodist Church. 2007.
- The Diocese of Arundel & Brighton (2024). Diocesan Directory 2024. Arundel.
- Vigar, John (1986). Exploring Sussex Churches. Rainham: Meresborough Books. ISBN 0-948193-09-3.
- Wales, Tony (1999). The West Sussex Village Book. Newbury: Countryside Books. ISBN 1-85306-581-1.
- Wilkinson, Edwin (2003). Looking Towards West Sussex Country Churches. Seaford: S.B. Publications. ISBN 1-85770-277-8.
- Windrum, Anthony (1978). Horsham: an Historical Survey. Chichester: Phillimore & Co. Ltd. ISBN 0-85033-284-2.
