= Blue Idol Quaker Meeting House =

Quaker meeting house in West Sussex, England

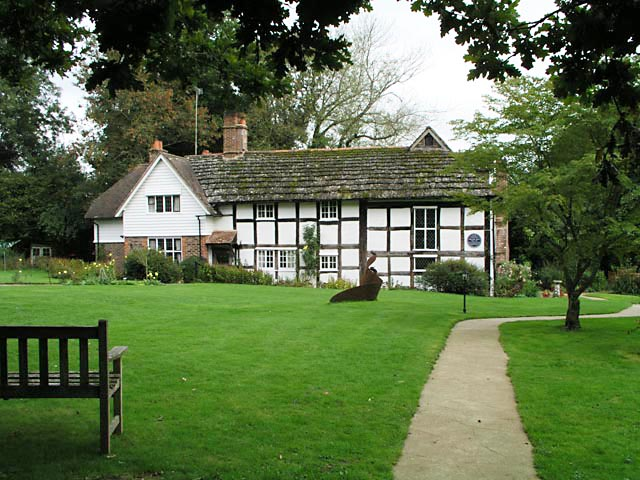
- Blue Idol Friends' Meeting House, Oldhouse Lane, Coolham, West Sussex

- Location in West Sussex

Religion
- Ecclesiastical or organisational status: Meeting house
- Status: Active

Location
- Location: Oldhouse Lane, Coolham, Thakeham, Horsham District, West Sussex 50.9837°N 0.4148°W
- Country: England

Website
- blueidol.org

The Blue Idol Quaker Meeting House (also known as the Blue Idol Meeting House and Guest House or simply the Blue Idol) is a historic Quaker meeting house at Oldhouse Lane, Coolham, in the parish of Thakeham, near Horsham, West Sussex, England. The core of the building is a late sixteenth-century timber-framed farmhouse adapted for Quaker worship in the 1690s. It is listed at Grade II* on the National Heritage List for England for its architectural and historic interest, including its close association with the Quaker leader and proprietor of Pennsylvania, William Penn.

== History ==
The earliest part of the Blue Idol is a small farmhouse dated by fabric analysis to about 1580 and originally known as Little Slatters. The house stands in a rural setting east of Oldhouse Lane, within what is now the parish of Thakeham in Horsham District, West Sussex.

Quakers in the area initially met in private houses, including those of local Friends John Snashold, William Penn and John Shaw of Shipley. In the early 1690s (sources differ between 1691 and 1692) a group of Friends purchased Little Slatters from John Shaw, together with about 1¼ acres (0.5 ha) of land, for use as a permanent meeting house. The south end of the house was altered to form a meeting room by removing part of the upper floor, inserting a gallery and new stair, and creating a tall central window and elders’ stand typical of early Quaker meeting houses.

The meeting at Blue Idol flourished in the later seventeenth and early eighteenth centuries but was discontinued in 1791. It was revived in 1874 as Quaker numbers in the area grew again in the nineteenth century. By 1869 the property and meeting were known as "Blue Idol", a name whose exact origin is uncertain.

From the late nineteenth century the north part of the building served as a caretaker's dwelling, which was extended in 1893 with a bay and additional accommodation. In the early twentieth century the structure deteriorated, and Young Friends held work camps in 1919, 1920 and 1923 to carry out repairs. From 1923 the house was used as a guest house for visiting Friends.

A substantial extension, designed by architect Hubert Lidbetter in a vernacular style, was added in 1934–35, and the historic fabric was restored at the same time. Further improvements and enlargements took place in 1969. The guest house use ceased in the late twentieth or early twenty-first century, and the attached house is now let as a residence.

Between 2013 and 2015 the meeting house underwent major conservation works, including timber and roof repairs, under architect Simon Dyson of HMDW Architects. Following this restoration the building was removed from the Heritage at Risk Register in 2015 and brought back into full use for worship.

== Association with William Penn ==
The Blue Idol is closely associated with William Penn (1644–1718), a leading figure in early Quakerism and the founder of the province of Pennsylvania. Penn lived at nearby Warminghurst in the late seventeenth century and was active in supporting local meetings for worship.

According to the Quaker Meeting Houses Heritage Project and the official listing, Penn was involved in establishing the meeting at Blue Idol and in securing a permanent building there. The connection is commemorated on the west elevation of the meeting house by a plaque erected by West Sussex County Council.

The attached burial ground includes an unmarked grave traditionally identified as that of Penn's daughter Letitia Aubrey (d. 1746). Historic England notes the presence of this grave, along with the adjacent detached Quaker burial ground, as part of the site's historic significance.

== Architecture and site ==
The meeting house began as an L-shaped, timber-framed farmhouse with brick base and plaster infill, under a Horsham slab roof. The older south wing, now containing the main meeting room, retains square-panel framing and weatherboarding, with a tall window lighting the meeting space. The vernacular style and domestic scale are characteristic of early Quaker meeting houses, which typically avoided overtly ecclesiastical architecture.

Inside, the three-bay meeting room preserves a gallery formed from the remnants of the original upper floor, with a panelled front accessed by a timber stair. The elders’ stand, fixed benches and other historic fittings survive, providing rare evidence of early Quaker internal arrangements. The building also contains a sixteenth-century coffin table, a fireplace with timber bressummer and several historic doors and joinery elements.

The 1930s extension to the north, by Hubert Lidbetter, is of brick at ground level with weatherboarding above and tiled roofs with brick stacks. It originally contained dining, kitchen and guest accommodation and continues in residential use.

The meeting house stands in generous gardens with an orchard, sculptures and an interpretive trail relating to William Penn. To the north-west is a small medieval timber-framed hovel barn, restored in the early twenty-first century and used for children's meetings and exhibitions. There is an attached burial ground immediately south-west of the meeting house, as well as a detached burial ground about 350 m to the north-west, still in use.

== Woolven family ==
Throughout the nineteenth century the Blue Idol was closely associated with the Woolven family, who served as long-term Quaker tenants and caretakers of the property. The Shipley parish tithe map of c. 1839–1840 records the farmhouse as "The Blue Idiot Plot", occupied by Richard Woolven. By the 1851 census the property appears under the standardised name "Blue Idol", with Richard's son Edward Woolven (aged 15) living there with his mother and siblings.

Although regular meetings for worship ceased in 1791, the property remained in Quaker ownership and the Woolvens continued to live at the Blue Idol as resident caretakers throughout the nineteenth century. When meetings for worship were revived in 1869, members of the Woolven family attended and helped to maintain the historic meeting room created under the Act of Toleration (1690).

The Woolvens’ long residency contributed significantly to the preservation of the building during periods when local membership was small. Their presence also provides the earliest documentary evidence for the modern name "Blue Idol", which is securely attested by 1851 and probably in use at least a decade earlier.

== Name ==
The origin of the name "Blue Idol" is not known. Historic England and the Quaker Meeting Houses Heritage Project both state that its derivation is uncertain, and Heritage Calling similarly remarks that “no-one knows the origins behind the name of Blue Idol”.

The earliest documentary evidence appears on the Shipley parish tithe map of c.1839–1840, where the plot is recorded as "The Blue Idiot Plot" and occupied by Richard Woolven. By the 1851 census, the property is listed as "Blue Idol", with Richard’s son Edward Woolven residing there. The close resemblance of the two forms has led researchers to interpret “Blue Idiot” as a likely mistranscription or clerical error, reflecting an informal local name that was already in use by the mid-nineteenth century.

As the name “Blue Idol” does not appear in any seventeenth- or eighteenth-century Quaker records, and as Friends did not typically assign figurative or symbolic names to their meeting houses, scholars of Quaker heritage conclude that the name originated locally rather than within the Quaker community. This interpretation is supported by the Quaker Meeting Houses Heritage Project and by Historic England sources, both of which note the absence of early Quaker usage and the fact that the name first appears only in nineteenth-century civil documents.

Local historian William Albery, in his A Millennium of Facts in the History of Horsham (1932), listed the Blue Idol among regional properties with unusual or archaic names, noting only that its origin was “obscure”.

In the absence of contemporary records or early Quaker usage, the derivation of "Blue Idol" remains unknown. Later explanations—connecting the name to periods of idleness, blue-washed plaster, or local humour—are twentieth-century traditions recorded in modern guidebooks and local histories, but they rest on retrospective interpretation rather than contemporary evidence and are treated with caution in modern scholarship.

== Heritage designation ==
Blue Idol Quaker Meeting House and Guest House is designated a Grade II* listed building. Historic England cites its significance as an exceptionally well-preserved example of a late seventeenth-century Quaker meeting house adapted from a sixteenth-century farmhouse, retaining historic fabric and fittings, and for its strong, well-documented association with William Penn and early Quakerism in Sussex. The hovel barn and other associated structures are regarded as part of the curtilage of the listed building.

== See also ==
- Grade II* listed buildings in West Sussex
- List of places of worship in Horsham District
- William Penn
- Religious Society of Friends
- Warminghurst
- Horsham Friends Meeting House
