= Hope Chapel =

Hope Chapel may refer to:

- Hope Chapel, Bristol, a historic chapel in Clifton, England
- Hope Chapel, Horsham, a former Congregational chapel in West Sussex, England
- Hope Chapel and Parson's House, a former Nonconformist Baptist chapel in Rochdale, England
- Hope Chapel, New York, located at 718 Broadway in New York City

== See also ==
- Hope City Church, a charity consisting of six autonomous churches in the United Kingdom
- Hope Presbyterian Church, an Evangelical Presbyterian church in Tennessee, United States
