= Charlotte Fell Smith =

English historian

Charlotte Fell Smith (2 January 1851 – 7 May 1937) was an English biographer and local historian whose work primarily focused on Nonconformists in early modern Britain and on the County of Essex.

== Life ==
Charlotte was born at Pattiswick Hall, Pattiswick, Essex, to Joseph Smith (1813–1904), farmer and justice of the peace, and his wife, Mary. The family were Quakers, and Charlotte attended the Friends' school in Lewes, and later in York.

She became a writer for magazines and reference works, specialising in historical biography. She also catalogued and organised the items held by the Colchester and Essex Museum at Colchester Castle.

Smith died at home in Felsted and was cremated.

== Writings ==
Charlotte Fell Smith wrote for periodicals, including Chambers's Journal, the National Review, Country Life, and the Essex Review, of which she was for a time editor.

She was the author of the first book-length biography of John Dee in 1909. Her other biographies included:

- Mary Rich, Countess of Warwick, 1625–1678: Her Family and Friends (1901)
- James Parnell, 1637–1656 (1906)
- Daniel Whittle Harvey (1915)
- William Bendlowes of Great Bardfield Place (1915)

Smith was "the most prolific female contributor to the Dictionary of National Biography", for which she wrote 231 articles.

Her other books were:

- Steven Crisp and his Correspondents (1892)
- Extracts from State Papers Relating to Friends (1910–11)
- with I. L. Goude, An Anthology of Essex (1911)
