= Madina Mosque, Horsham =

Mosque in West Sussex, England

Madina Mosque
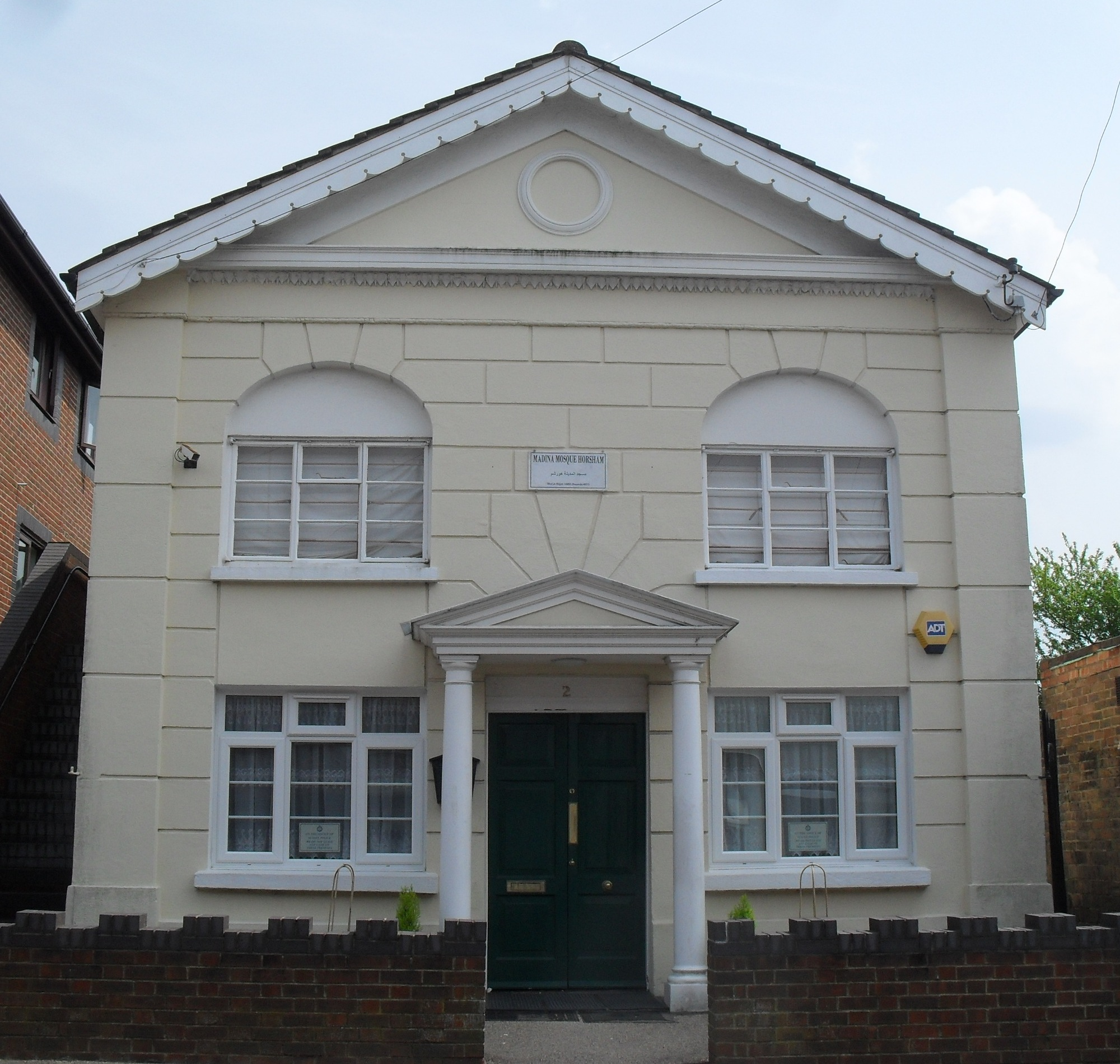

Religion
- Affiliation: Deobandi

Location
- Location: 2 Park Terrace East, Horsham, District of Horsham, West Sussex RH13 5DN, England
- Interactive map of Madina Mosque
- Administration: Bangladeshi, Gujarati and Pakistani
- Coordinates: 51.0609°N 0.3231°W

Architecture
- Style: Classical
- Established: 2008 (as mosque); 1857 (as Baptist chapel)
- Capacity: 200 (men only)

Website
- https://horsham-masjid.co.uk/

Madina Mosque is a mosque in the centre of Horsham, an ancient market town in the English county of West Sussex. It has served the Muslim community of the town and the surrounding district of Horsham since 2008. The plain stuccoed building in which it is housed was originally a Baptist chapel – one of several in the town, which has a long history of Nonconformist Christian worship. The former Jireh Independent Chapel was in commercial use until Muslims acquired it after a lengthy search for a permanent space. The organization 'Muslims in Britain' classifies the Madina Mosque as "Deobandi".

== History ==
Horsham developed from the 10th century as a market town at a point in the High Weald of north Sussex where the River Arun could be crossed. Religious worship was focused on the 12th-century parish church of St Mary at first, but Protestant Nonconformism thrived from the 17th century. One of the many denominations for which chapels were founded between then and the 19th century was the Strict Baptist community. During a spate of church-building in the 19th and early 20th centuries, three chapels opened for followers of the cause.

A pastor called Mr Raynsford founded the first of these in 1814. His congregation worshipped in a room in a private building at first, but in 1857 a permanent building was erected in nearby Park Terrace East. It was called Jireh Independent Baptist Chapel, although the name Jireh Strict Baptist Chapel was sometimes used as well. The congregation was called "Free Baptist" by 1882. Horsham's second Strict Baptist Chapel, named Rehoboth, was founded in 1834 by seceders from the congregation; it remains in use by Strict Baptists, but the Jireh Chapel cause failed in the mid-20th century. It was still in use in 1938, but on 9 September 1953 the marriage licence it had been granted in December 1860 was cancelled. The building passed into commercial use and was altered internally and externally, in particular by the addition of a porch. By the start of the 21st century, it was a hairdressing salon.

Meanwhile, a small Muslim community had developed in the growing town. In about 1994, they first attempted to get permission to open a place of worship. The congregation used an industrial building and then a private house on the Brighton Road, but planning permission to register these permanently was refused in each case, and there was opposition from local residents. Permission was granted to hold prayer meetings and other activities at the house in 2005, but Horsham District Council rescinded this in 2008, citing complaints about noise and a reluctance to allow a permanent change of use from residential to non-residential. An application was then submitted for conversion of the former Jireh Chapel from a salon into a mosque, and this was approved in May 2008.

== Architecture ==
The former chapel is a simple Classical-style building with a painted stucco façade. The ground floor is rusticated, and there are round-arched windows at first-floor level. The exterior was painted after the building's conversion to commercial use, and a Classical-style porch with a pediment and columns was added.

== Current status ==
The chapel originally had a capacity of 150, but since its conversion it can now accommodate 200. Attendance at Friday prayers is typically around 80. The mosque is registered as a charity with the Charity Commission.

== See also ==
- Islam in the United Kingdom
- Islamic schools and branches
- Islamism
- List of mosques
- List of mosques in the United Kingdom
- List of places of worship in Horsham (district)
