= St Hugh's Charterhouse =

Monastery in Cowfold, West Sussex, England

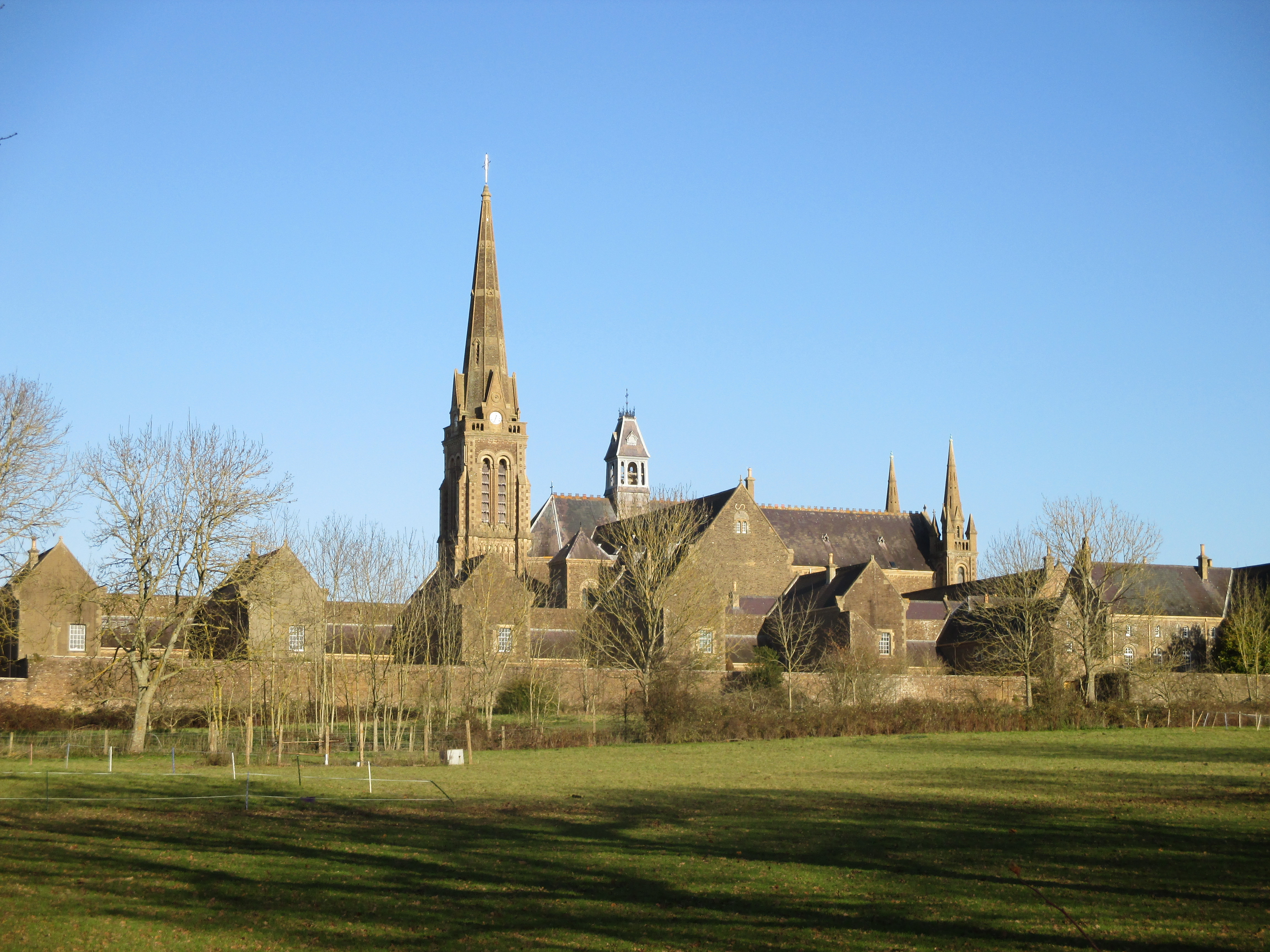
- Interactive map of St Hugh's Charterhouse

Monastery information
- Other name: Parkminster
- Order: Carthusian
- Denomination: Roman Catholic
- Established: 1873
- Mother house: Grande Chartreuse, Isère, France
- Dedication: Hugh of Lincoln

Architecture
- Heritage designation: Grade II* listed

Site
- Location: Parkminster, near Cowfold, Horsham, West Sussex, England
- Coordinates: 50°58′22.84″N 0°16′57.85″W
- Website: www.parkminster.org.uk

St Hugh's Charterhouse, Parkminster, is the only post-Reformation Carthusian monastery in the United Kingdom. It is located in the parish of Cowfold, West Sussex, England. It is a Grade II* listed building.

== History ==
The monastery was founded in 1873, when the property formerly known as Picknoll was acquired for its construction in order to accommodate two houses of French Carthusians in exile. Building took place between 1876 and 1883 to designs by a French architect, Clovis Normand, who had at his disposal a generous budget. The number of monks has varied: 30 in 1883, 70 in 1928, 22 in 1984 and 26 in January 2017.

The buildings are in a French Gothic Revival style although Pevsner's judgement was that 'the plan is magnificent and can only be properly seen from the air'. The church has an unusually tall 62-metre (203 ft) spire. It stands in the centre of buildings including a library with a collection of rare books and manuscripts and a chapter house decorated with images of the martyrdom of the monks' predecessors. The charterhouse has relics of Ss. Hugh of Lincoln, Boniface, Roseline of Villeneuve, and numerous smaller relics.

The Great Cloister, about 550 metres (1,800 ft) long, one of the longest in the world, connects the 34 hermitages to the church and the other buildings, embracing four acres of orchards and the monastic burial ground. The total length of the cloisters is 1,012 m.

500 solar panels were installed in 2024, which are intended to save over 2,300 tonnes of carbon dioxide over a period of 20 years.

== See also ==
- List of Carthusian monasteries
- List of monasteries dissolved by Henry VIII of England
- List of monastic houses in England
- List of places of worship in Horsham District

== External sources ==
- Official website
