= St Mark's Church, Horsham =

Church in United Kingdom

Coordinates: 51.0784°N 0.3178°W

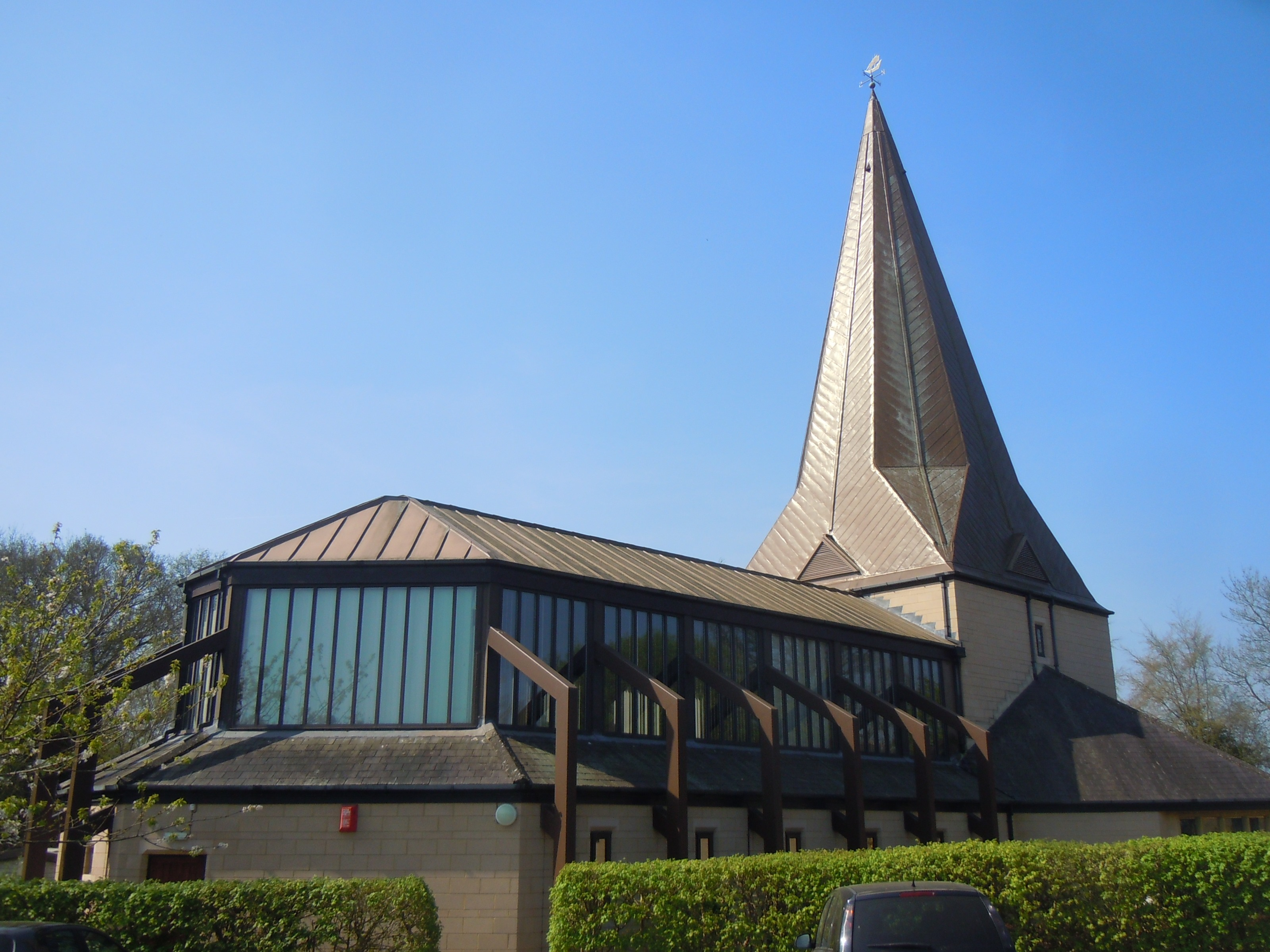
St Mark's Church, North Heath

St Mark's Church is an Anglican church situated on North Heath Lane in the newly created Parish and Benefice of Holbrook in the district of Horsham, West Sussex in Great Britain. There is a church hall which is available for hire by community groups or for private functions.

== Old St. Mark's North Street ==
The first church of St. Mark's was constructed on a piece of land donated by Thomas Coppard. It was designed by architect William Moseley as a chapel of ease to St. Mary's. The first incarnation was built 1840-41. Its original building was based on 13th-century gothic style. Its second incarnation introduced a major rebuilding project began in 1870. The architects M E Habershon and E P L Brock designed a completely new structure which included rebuilding the south aisle and establishing a tower. In 1872 work continued on the nave and the spire was added in 1878. The builder given the task of the project was Dorking-based William Shearburn. The spire was built as a memorial to Canon A.H. Bridges only daughter Mary, this still remains today as a monument. A chancel was added in 1888.

== New St. Mark's, North Heath Lane ==
The new St Mark's church was established when the first clump of earth was dug on 30 May 1989, following a procession from the old church to the new. The piece of land where the church sits was donated by Robert Hurst. The parish received ownership of the newly completed church on 17 May 1990 following one year of construction. The church was then formally consecrated on 29 July 1990 by the Bishop of Horsham Colin Docker. The new building was designed by architect John Warren who was architect to The Weald & Downland Museum and to Amberley Chalk Pits Museum. Built by Longleys of Crawley from 1989-1990 during the time of construction the congregation met in a portacabin on the grounds of the Royal & Sun Alliance Sports & Social Club (now the Holbrook Club).

The building is modern in style, equipped with good facilities and it stands at the heart of the community which has formed over the last 30 years in the Holbrook area of North Horsham.

St Mark's Church became a parish church in its own right on 18 October 2016, having become independent of the Parish of Horsham team ministry and will be known as St Mark's Holbrook.

== See also ==
- List of places of worship in Horsham (district)
