= Holy Innocents Church, Southwater =

Anglican parish church in West Sussex, England

Coordinates: 51.0252°N 0.3585°W

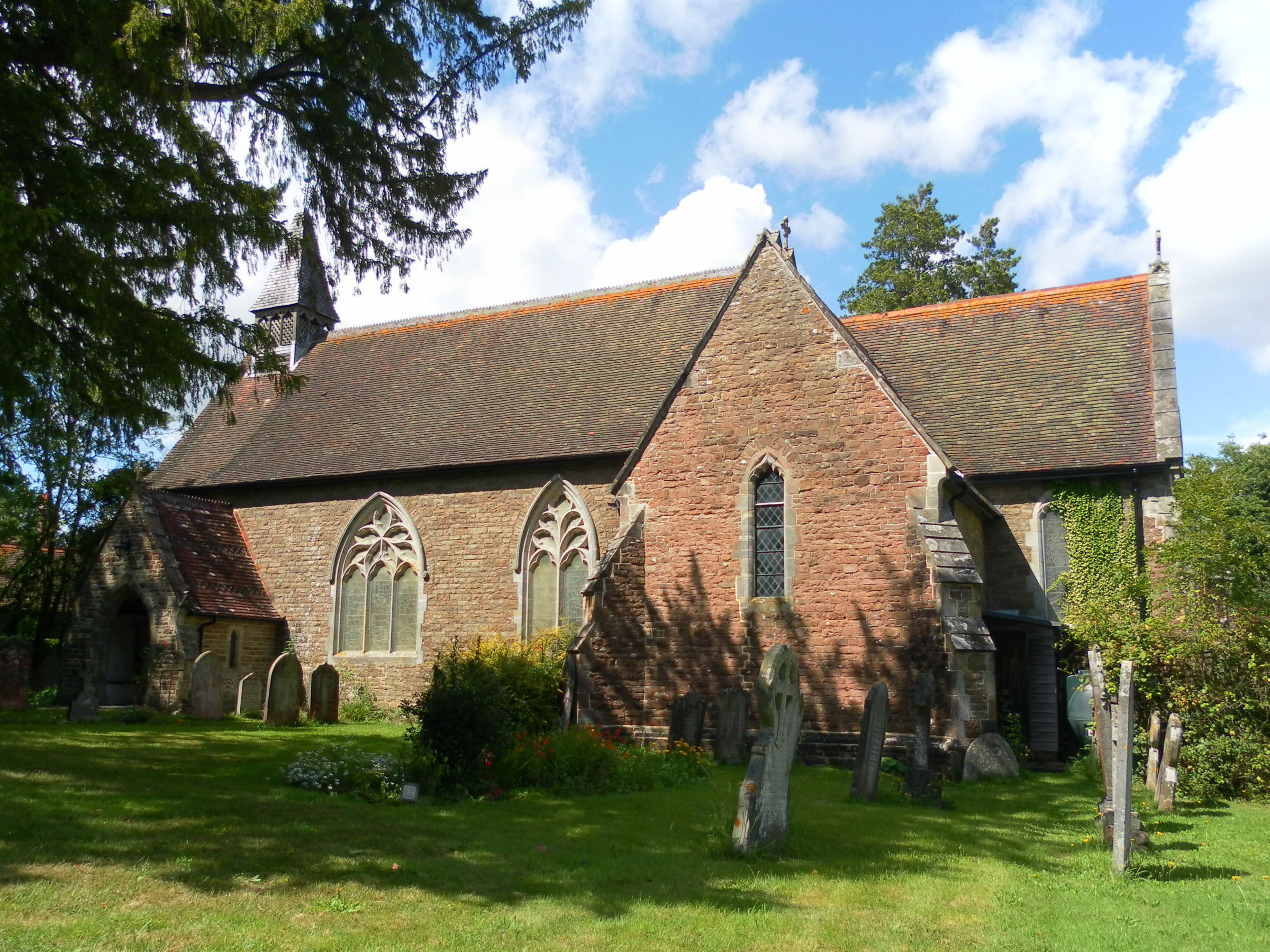
Church of the Holy Innocents, Southwater

Holy Innocents Church is the Anglican parish church of Southwater, a village in the Horsham District of West Sussex, England. Built in 1849, the church has a cruciform footprint. Inside there are many stained glass windows, donated to the church by the Piper family and the Old Blues of Christ's Hospital School. The church grounds include the church, its graveyards, a house, a church room and a Scout and Guide hut.

The present building is the first parish church in the village of Southwater. It is almost entirely Victorian, built to accommodate the few residents of what was then a long and straggling village based on several farms, including Great House Farm and College Farm. Much of the land was then, and remains now, in the ownership of the Fletcher family, which gave the land on which the church was built. Most of the walls are of local Horsham Stone. It was one of a number of churches designed by James Park Harrison (1817-1902). The building was constructed largely of local materials from a quarry at Stammerham (Griggs Farm), a pit on Great House Farm and the quarry at St. Leonard's Forest. The cost was said to be ‘in the region of £1,800’.

The foundation stone was laid on 28 December 1848, the Feast Day of the Holy Innocents. Whilst the fact may be thought to account for the dedication of the Church, the choice of dedication actually derives from the misfortune suffered by the Fletcher family, three of the children of the Sir Henry Fletcher dying early. Sir Henry himself died in September 1851, the baptistery window being dedicated to his memory. The church was consecrated by the Bishop of Chichester, Ashurst Turner Gilbert, on 7 June 1850 and the parish was formed from part of Horsham Parish in the North and part of Shipley Parish in the South, being, at the outset, the ‘Consolidated Chapelry of Southwater’, and served by curates from Horsham Parish Church for the first three years. The first vicar, Arthur Dendy, was inducted in 1853. The original vicarage was built in 1854 and was sold off in the 1960s when a new vicarage was built in the grounds. Today the vicar is Rev Godfrey who replaced Rev Dominic Newstead in 2010. Holy Innocents now serves a much larger population than when it was built.

The church remains much as it was, except for the addition of a vestry on the south side in 1909/1910, at a cost of £280, of which sum £200 was donated by the Fletcher family. An additional one acre of ground was given by the Fletcher family for the Burial Ground in use today. Various works of repair and decoration have been carried out over the years; for instance after suffering subsidence, underpinning works were undertaken in 2002 together with large-scale repairs to the stonework at a cost of more than £200,000.

The building is Grade II listed (21 November 1995), the citation noting 'built of stone rubble with ashlar dressings and tiled roof and wood and shingled bellcote'. Of the stained glass 'south and east walls have C19th stained glass. North aisle has six stained glass windows of 1986 depicting the history of Christs Hospital by Harold Thompson.

A comprehensive Record of the Church Furnishings was undertaken by the Horsham Group of The National Association of Decorative and Fine Arts and published in 2013. A copy is available in the church for public reference and on-line through the NADFAS site.

The Church publishes ten editions of the Southwater News annually as part of the Southwater Parish Church outreach programme.

== See also ==
- List of places of worship in Horsham (district)
- Southwater Local History Group
