= Hope Chapel, Horsham =

Hope Chapel
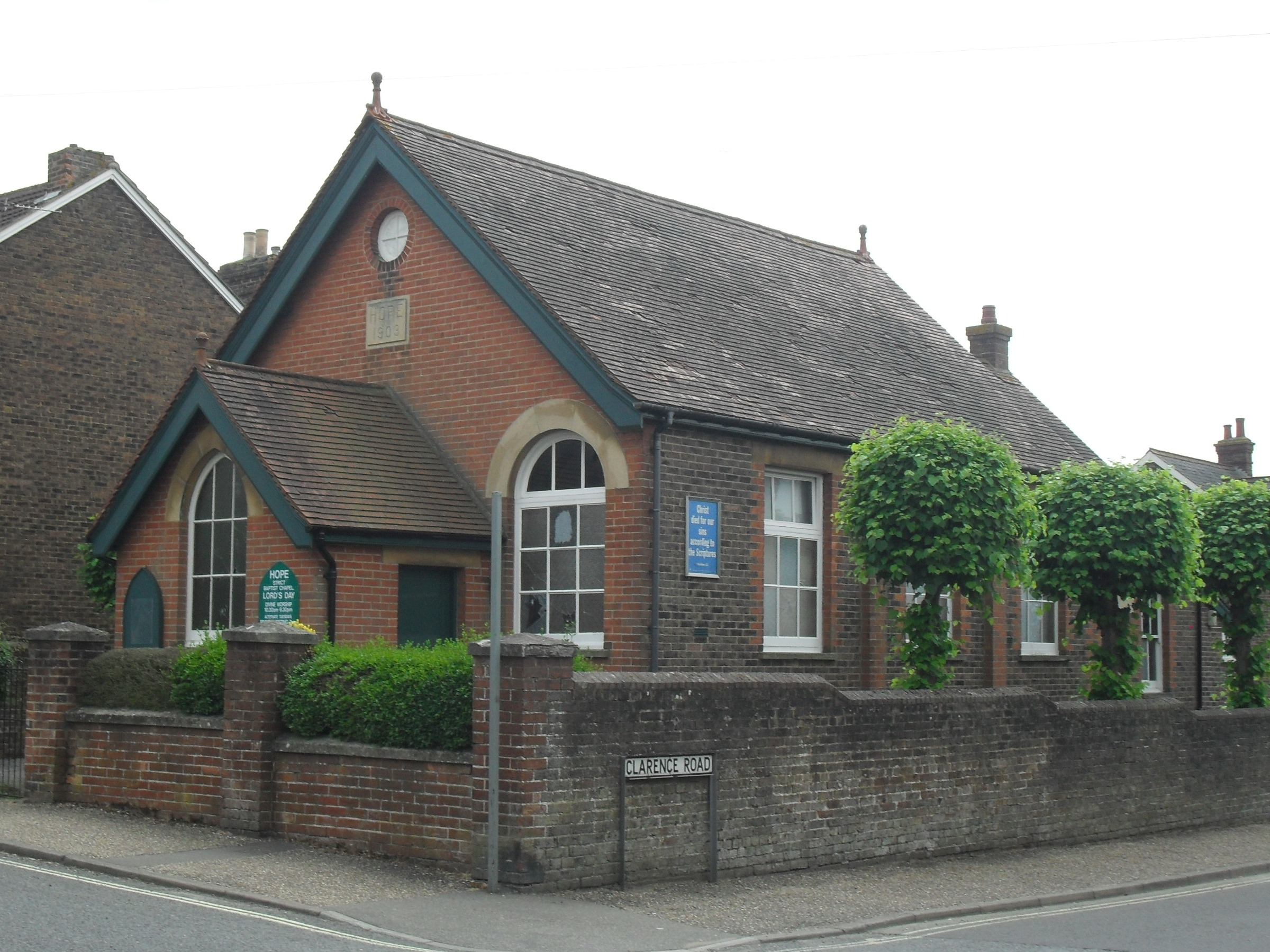
- The chapel
- Hope Chapel
- 51.06317°N 0.31558°W
- OS grid reference: TQ 18129 30664
- Location: Horsham, West Sussex
- Country: England
- Denomination: Baptist

History
- Status: Chapel
- Founded: 1900

Architecture
- Functional status: Active
- Style: Vernacular
- Completed: 1903

The Hope Chapel is a Strict Baptist place of worship in the town of Horsham in the English county of West Sussex. The chapel was built in 1903.

Horsham's second Strict Baptist chapel had its origins in meetings in a public hall in March 1900. The congregation moved several times, but on 2 December 1903 their new red-brick square-windowed chapel on Oakhill Road was inaugurated, and worship has continued there ever since. The three founders were from Kent.

== See also ==
- List of places of worship in Horsham (district)
- List of Strict Baptist churches
