= Lewes Friends Meeting House =

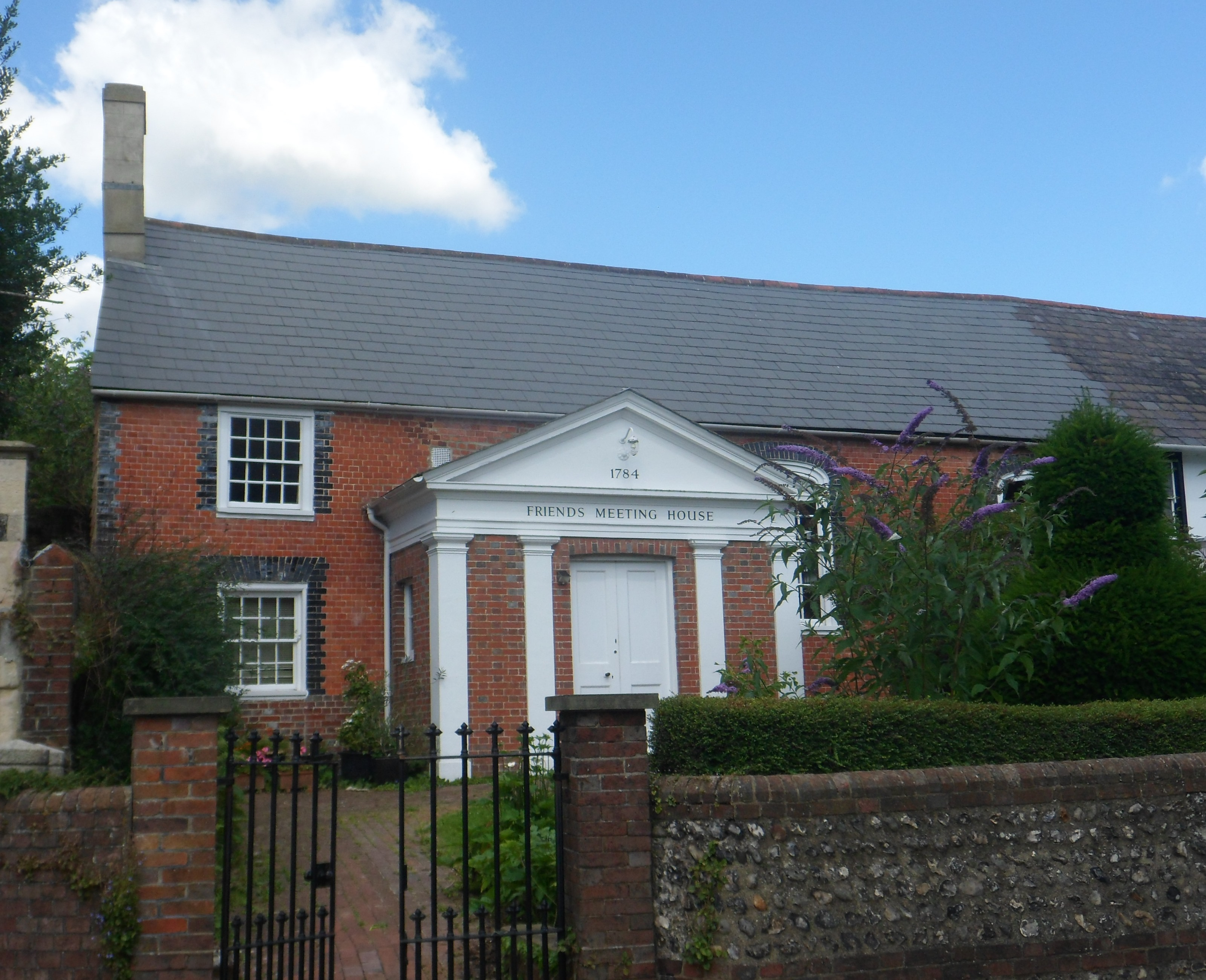
- The meeting house from the southeast in 2014

- Location in East Sussex
- 50°52′22″N 0°00′50″E
- OS grid reference: TQ 41796 10067
- Location: 32 Friars Walk, Lewes, East Sussex BN7 2LE
- Country: England
- Denomination: Quaker
- Website: www.lewesquakers.org.uk

History
- Status: Meeting house
- Founded: 1675 (at Puddle Wharf)

Architecture
- Functional status: Active
- Heritage designation: Grade II
- Designated: 29 October 1985
- Style: Vernacular
- Completed: 1784
- Construction cost: £229

Lewes Friends Meeting House is a Religious Society of Friends (Quaker) place of worship in the town of Lewes, part of the district of the same name in East Sussex, England. A Quaker community became established in the town in 1655 when George Fox, prominent Dissenter and founder of the Religious Society of Friends, first visited. A meeting house opened in 1675 and a burial ground was erected in 1697. The present meeting house, which is a Grade II listed building, was built in 1784 on the site of the burial ground. The building has undergone "a long and complex history of extensions" and rounds of alterations, including the addition of two cottages and a coach-house (since demolished). It is one of a wide range of Protestant Nonconformist places of worship in the town, many of which have been established for centuries.

== History ==
The origins of Lewes's Quaker community lie in a small group of Seekers based in the parish of Southover, which was absorbed into Lewes in the 20th century. Seekers were an informal, unstructured, non-denominational Puritan group which emerged around the time of the Commonwealth of England and the English Civil War. Many members became Quakers, and this was the case with the group in Southover. In March 1655, a Quaker from Westmorland (Note: Firbank Fell in Westmorland (present-day Cumbria) was the site of one of the earliest and largest episodes of Quaker evangelism, when George Fox converted a large group of Seekers who were meeting outside the structures of the Church of England.) visited the house of John Russell, one of the Seekers in Southover, and converted three others to the Quaker cause; five months later George Fox, the founder of the Religious Society of Friends, and another early follower Alexander Parker preached at Russell's house during a tour of Sussex. Despite persecution, the cause thrived: in 1669, when meetings took place informally in the area of Lewes known as Cliffe, a religious survey found 60 adherents, about 20 of whom were from outside Lewes. Most were described in the survey as "of the middle[-class] sort": principally traders and craftsmen. At that time it was one of 13 permanent Quaker meetings in Sussex—although none of these occupied permanent meeting houses, instead using "safe private houses and farm buildings". Membership declined in the 18th century—by the 1720s there were said to be only four Quaker families in Lewes—but numbers later recovered and meetings never ceased: the community has met continuously in the town since 1655.

A permanent meeting house opened at Puddle Wharf (or Puddlewharf) in 1675. This was in or near the present Foundry Lane. Quakers took ownership of the property upon the death in 1678 of its original owner. Alterations were carried out in 1752, apparently to the extent of a complete rebuild. Prior to this, in 1697, a site on Friars Walk was bought and a burial ground was laid out. The first burials took place in 1698. By 1784 the Puddle Wharf building was said to be "unfit to sit in" as, among other reasons, it was close to a slaughterhouse. It was sold for £110 to a newly formed congregation of Particular Baptists and the present meeting house was built on part of the burial ground in Friars Walk. The first addition was a cottage in 1801; internal alterations to the meeting house gallery were also carried out at this time. The present porch, a prominent structure which more closely resembles a portico, was added in 1812, and a second, larger cottage was built in 1860. The building therefore presents a very long façade to Friars Walk. A coach-house was also added in the 19th century.

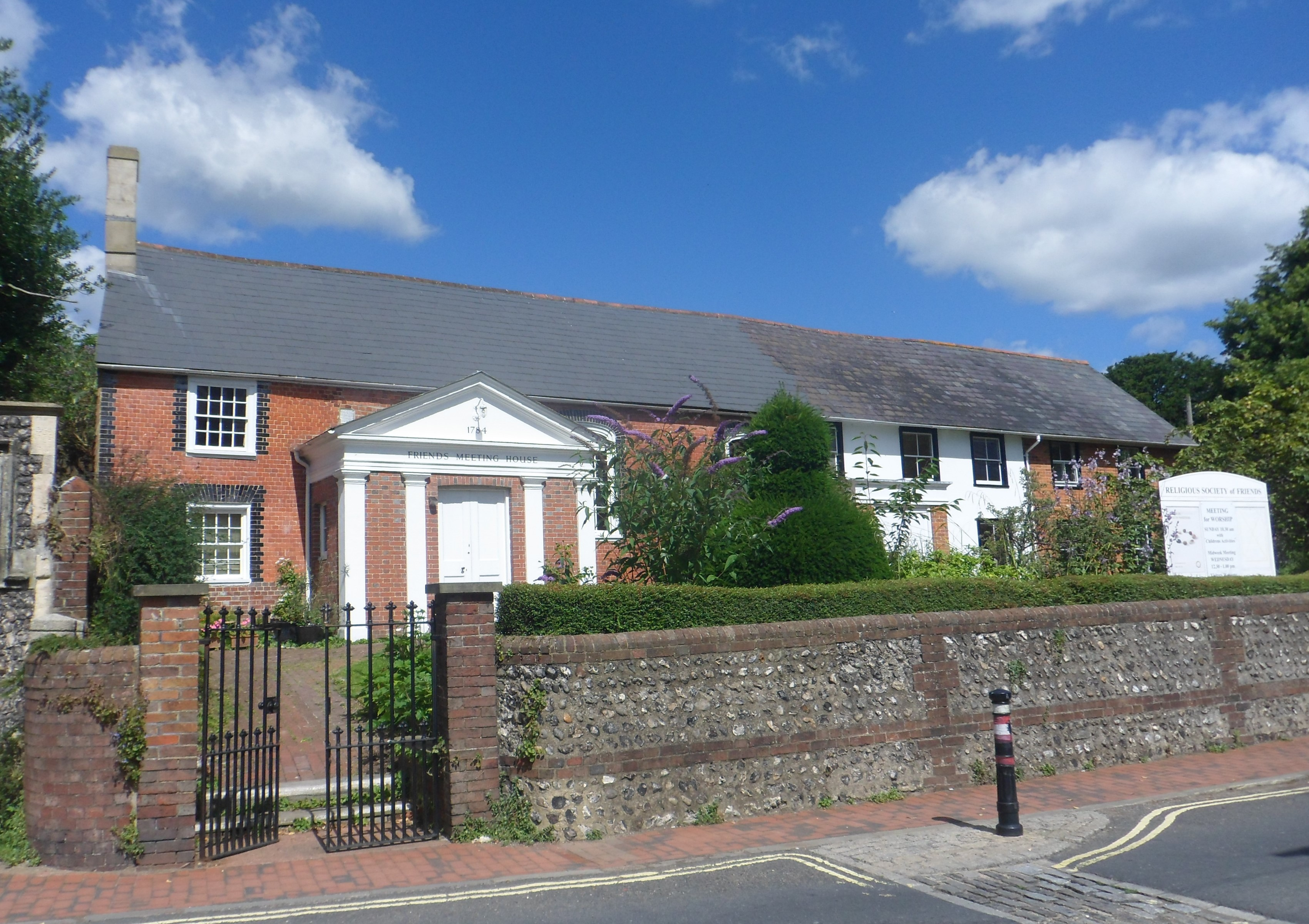
The meeting house has two cottages attached to its right (north) side.

Some alterations were carried out in 1955 to the design of Hubert Lidbetter. He was a Quaker from Dublin who had started an architectural practice in London in the 1920s and whose commissions for the Society of Friends included Friends House, the central offices and conference centre for Quakers in Britain. Lidbetter became "the most influential architect of meeting houses [in the interwar] period" and afterwards (he died in 1966) and was comfortable working in a range of styles. Bigger changes came in the late 1970s, though, when Lewes District Council needed to build a road to connect Friars Walk to a new car park. The 19th-century coach-house was demolished to make way for the road, and a new extension was built to incorporate a flat for the resident warden. A porch with a flat roof was added to the second (1860) cottage at this time. This work was carried out in 1977–78 at a cost of about £25,000.

Lewes Friends Meeting House is one of three surviving 18th-century Friends meeting houses in Sussex, along with Herstmonceux (1734) and Horsham (1786). It was designated a Grade II listed building on 29 October 1985. It is registered for worship in accordance with the Places of Worship Registration Act 1855; its number on the register is 4502. The meeting house remains in use with one service on Sundays, and a midweek meeting also takes place at a nearby venue. The meeting house represents one of the many strands of Protestant Nonconformist belief which have shaped Lewes's history for more than three centuries. "The roll-call of the denominations that have ... been present in the town is unusually long": among others, Unitarians, Methodists, Baptists, Strict Baptists, the Countess of Huntingdon's Connexion, Presbyterians and Congregationalists all founded chapels between the 17th and the 19th century, and most of these congregations have continued in some form into the 21st century.

=== School ===
For many years in the 19th and early 20th centuries there was an independent boarding school for Quaker girls at 65 High Street, Lewes, run by three spinsters. The school had about 25 children at any one time, and they attended the Friends Meeting House each Sunday during term time. Former pupils include the writer Maude Robinson and the mother of Barrow Cadbury of the Cadbury family. Barrow Cadbury attended the meeting house on one occasion in the 1950s prior to the alterations carried out by Hubert Lidbetter. Upon hearing that the work was required, he donated £600 towards the estimated cost of over £1,000.

== Architecture ==
The 1784 meeting house and the original (1801) cottage are timber-framed buildings on red-brick plinths laid in the Flemish bond pattern. The timber walls are faced with red mathematical tiles. The later extensions are of brick. The south-facing side wall and the rear wall are laid with tiles, as is the rear section of the roof; the front part is of slate. One of the two original chimney-stacks survives; the other was removed during the alterations of the 1970s. The second (1860) cottage is of brick with a rendered façade. The three buildings are under a single roof "in a linear arrangement". The architectural style is Vernacular. "Timber-framed construction became increasingly popular" for the construction of Nonconformist chapels and meeting houses in Sussex in the late 18th and early 19th centuries; an "outstanding" example nearby, also faced with mathematical tiles, is Jireh Chapel (now Lewes Free Presbyterian Church).

Fenestration consists of two straight-headed sash windows to the left of the entrance porch, and two taller windows with three-centred arches to the right. Some structural evidence of a former, or intended, doorway survives between these two windows. The cottage has pairs of four-panelled straight-headed sash and casement windows. The 1977–78 extension has similar fenestration. All windows are surrounded by dressings of glazed black brickwork, a motif which is repeated in the quoins. The portico-style porch added to the meeting house in the 19th century is topped with a pediment and has paired Doric pilasters on top of brickwork.

The interior of the meeting house, which is entirely of pine, measures approximately 43 1/2 by 20 feet (13.3 m × 6.1 m) and has a large meeting room, a smaller room adjacent and a room above this, retaining an 18th-century fireplace. There is a decorative coved cornice around the ceiling of the large room.

== Burial ground ==
The burial ground, laid out in 1697, was open to burials between 1698 and 1926, since when only the burial of ashes has been permitted. The headstones were moved twice in the late 20th century, but remains were not moved. Burials include the architect and botanist Joseph Woods (d. 1864) and several prominent local Quakers, including members of the Rickman family. When inspected in the 1990s the gravestones of John (d. 1789) and Elizabeth (d. 1795) Rickman were visible, but by the time the burial ground was surveyed in 2015 no dates prior to the mid-19th century could be discerned.

== See also ==
- List of places of worship in Lewes District
- Media related to Lewes Friends' Meeting House at Wikimedia Commons

== Bibliography ==
- Antram, Nicholas; Pevsner, Nikolaus (2013). Sussex: East with Brighton and Hove. The Buildings of England. London: Yale University Press. ISBN 978-0-300-18473-0.
- Beevers, David; Marks, Richard; Roles, John (1989). Sussex Churches and Chapels. Brighton: The Royal Pavilion, Art Gallery and Museums. ISBN 0-948723-11-4.
- Brent, Colin; Rector, William (1980). Victorian Lewes. Chichester: Phillimore & Co. Ltd. ISBN 0-85033-355-5.
- Connell, J. M. (1931). Lewes: Its Religious History. Lewes: W. E. Baxter Ltd.
- Elleray, D. Robert (2004). Sussex Places of Worship. Worthing: Optimus Books. ISBN 0-9533132-7-1.
- Goring, Jeremy (2003). Burn, Holy Fire! Religion in Lewes since the Reformation. Cambridge: Lutterworth Press. ISBN 0-7188-3040-7.
- Skidmore, Chris (2021). Quakers and their Meeting Houses. Swindon: Liverpool University Press. ISBN 978-1-80085-720-9.
- Stell, Christopher (2002). Nonconformist Chapels and Meeting-houses in Eastern England. Swindon: English Heritage. ISBN 1-873592-50-7.
