= Coolham =

Village and parish in West Sussex, England

Coordinates: 50.99322°N 0.4052°W

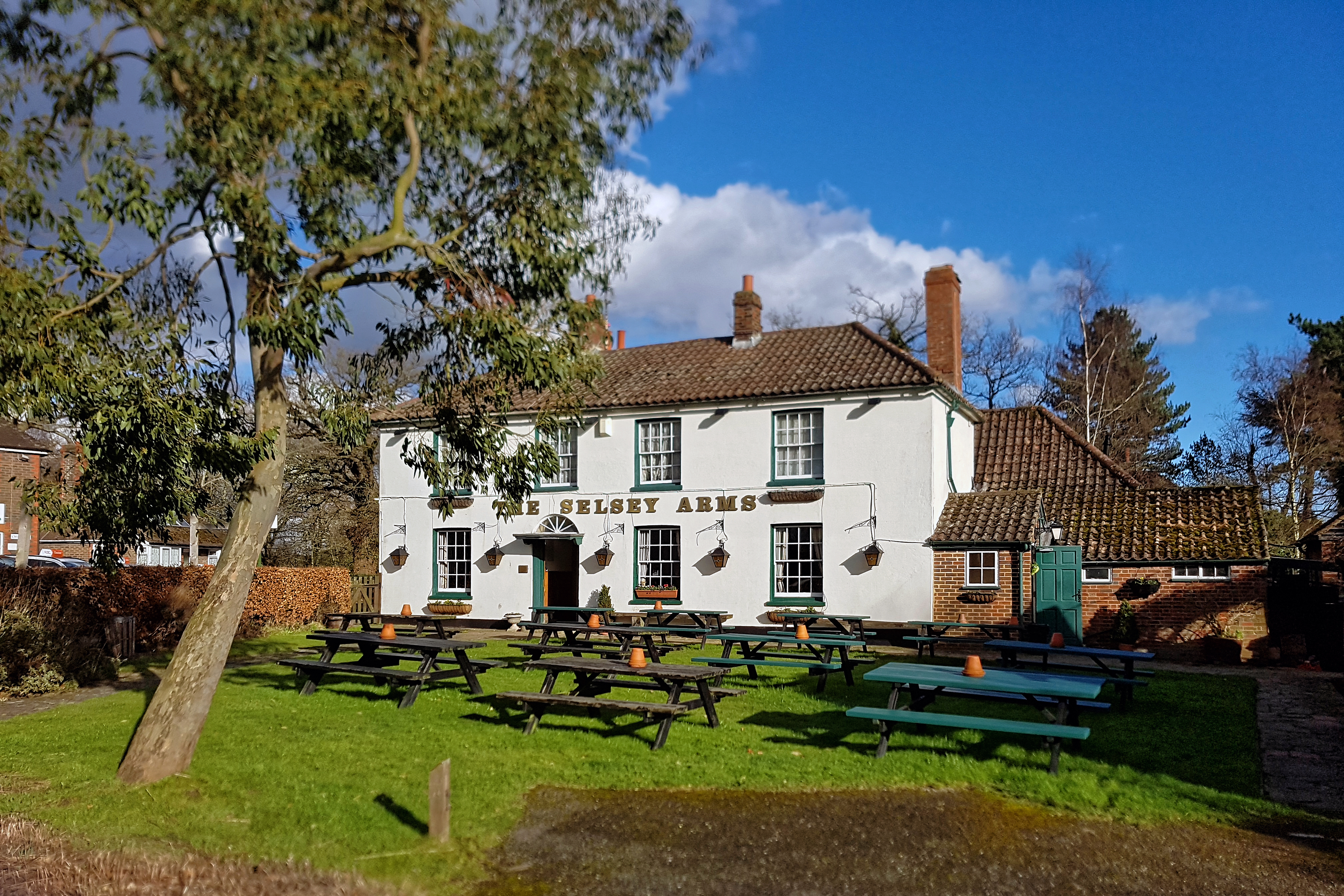
- Selsey Arms, Coolham

- Location within West Sussex
- OS grid reference: TQ120227
- Civil parish: Shipley
- District: Horsham
- Shire county: West Sussex
- Region: South East
- Country: England
- Sovereign state: United Kingdom
- Post town: HORSHAM
- Postcode district: RH13 8
- Police: Sussex
- Fire: West Sussex
- Ambulance: South East Coast
- UK Parliament: Horsham

Coolham is a small village in the civil parish of Shipley and the Horsham District of West Sussex, England. It is at the crossroads of the A272 and B2139 roads 2.8 miles (4.6 km) south-east of Billingshurst.

During the Second World War there was an Advanced Landing Ground nearby called RAF Coolham, used to support the D-Day landings. This was only in use for about eighteen months, and had almost no permanent buildings.

There was once a prominent Quaker community in Coolham, and the "Blue Idol" meeting house, a timber-framed building, still exists just under 1 mile to the west, in the adjacent parish of Thakeham. William Penn, who earlier had founded Pennsylvania in America, was closely involved in its establishment, and is believed to have worshipped there. The local junior school was founded as the Coolham British School (later Coolham Primary School) in 1889 by the Quakers.

Coolham is in the ancient parish of Shipley, which adjoins the A24, near the ruin of Knepp Castle. The castle dates back to medieval times, and was used as a hunting lodge for King John.
