= Horsham Friends Meeting House =

Quaker meeting house in England

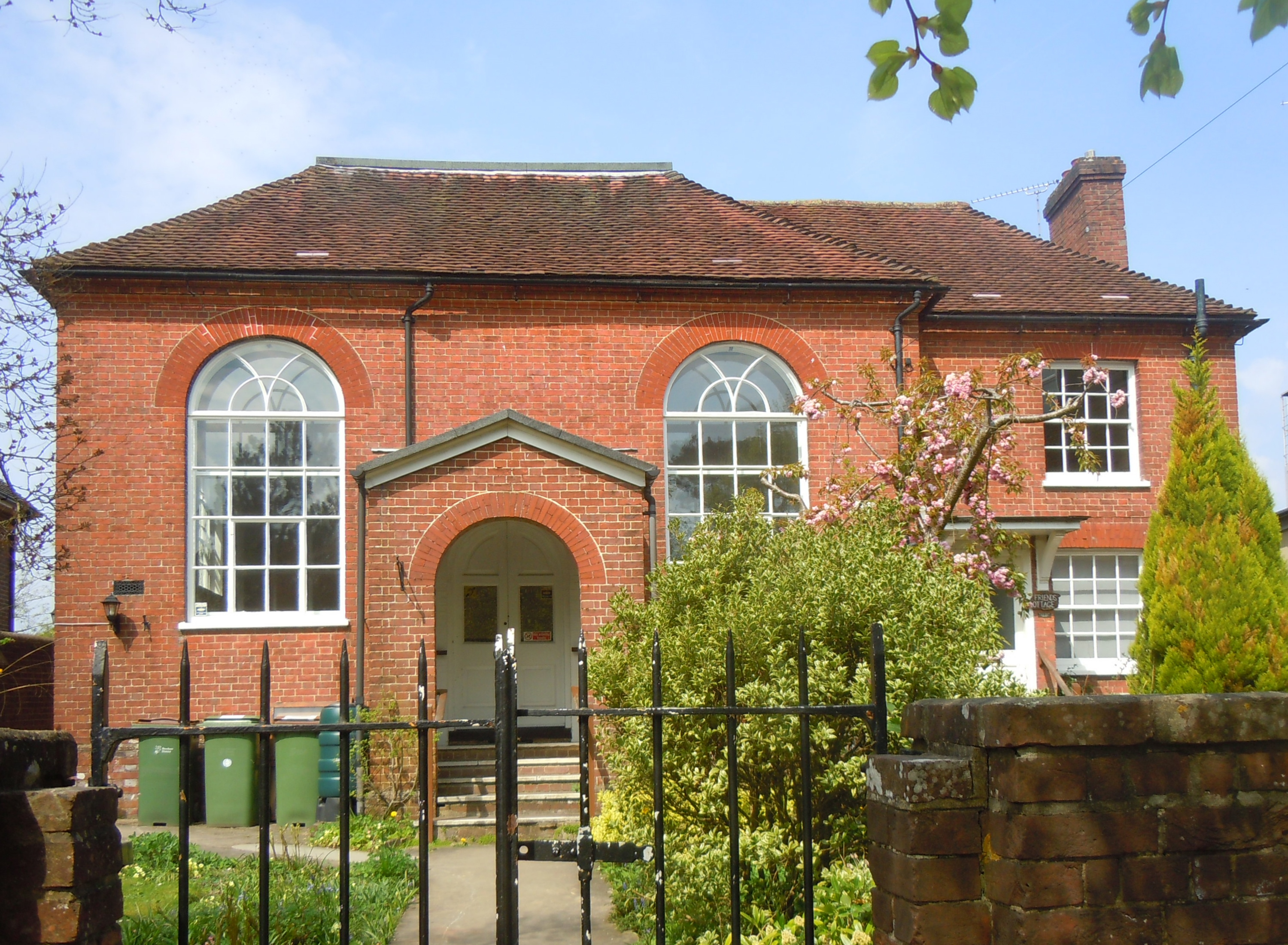
- The meeting house from the east in 2018

- Location in West Sussex
- 51°03′45″N 0°20′02″W
- OS grid reference: TQ 16848 30552
- Location: Worthing Road, Horsham, West Sussex RH12 1SL
- Country: England
- Denomination: Quaker
- Website: horshamquakers.org.uk

History
- Status: Meeting house
- Founded: 1693

Architecture
- Functional status: Active
- Heritage designation: Grade II
- Designated: 26 July 1974
- Style: Georgian
- Completed: 1786
- Construction cost: £536 14s. 5 1/2d.

Horsham Friends Meeting House is a Religious Society of Friends (Quaker) place of worship in the town of Horsham, part of the district of the same name in West Sussex, England. It was built in 1786 to replace a meeting house nearly 100 years older on the same site, built for a Quaker community which had been active in the town for several years. "A fine Georgian building with original furnishings", it has Grade II listed status.

== History ==
The first Quaker presence in the ancient market town of Horsham was in 1655. In that year the founder of the Society of Friends George Fox first visited Sussex, and it is sometimes claimed that he stopped off in Horsham—although there is no evidence to suggest he founded the congregation in the town or even visited at that time. His diary records that "I passed into Sussex and lodged near Horsham where there was a great meeting, and many convinced" (i.e. converted). (Note: Fox and another early follower Alexander Parker are known to have "preached at the house of Richard Bonwick in Ifield in 1655", which led to the founding of Ifield Friends Meeting House.) Whether from Fox's influence or not, in 1655 a group of Quakers preached in the market place and one was jailed for "causing a disturbance in church" (St Mary's, the Church of England parish church). Quakers were seen as "striking directly at the foundations of order and authority" in ecclesiastical and public life, and they faced violence from the public and were regularly jailed. The cause grew quickly, though: by 1668, Horsham was one of 13 locations in Sussex recorded as having permanent Quaker meetings. At that time none of these places had permanent meeting houses, members instead using "safe private houses and farm buildings", but this soon changed: one was built at Ifield, a short distance from Horsham, in 1676 (still in use, and one of the oldest continuously operating purpose-built Friends meeting houses) and another had opened in Lewes the previous year (superseded in 1784 by the present Lewes Friends Meeting House).

In Horsham, regular meetings were taking place in private houses from 1668; these became weekly in 1687, by which time both George Fox and influential Quaker William Penn had visited the town; and in 1693 a permanent meeting house was built on land acquired on Worthing Road. A cottage stood on this land, and the meeting house was built behind it. Further land at the front of the plot was used as a burial ground from 1697. The religious census of 1676 found about 100 Nonconformists in Horsham parish, out of a population of about 3,000; many of these would have been Quakers. The buildings were dilapidated by the late 18th century, so they were cleared in 1785–86 and a replacement meeting house was built further forward, closer to the road, in 1786. A cottage was built onto the northeast side at this time. The work cost £536 14s. 5½d.

Numbers declined in the 19th century. In 1801 48 Quakers were recorded in Horsham parish, but 50 years later the typical Sunday attendance at the meeting house was around ten people, and although Sunday services continued throughout this period there was a period in the 1870s and 1880s when there was no regular congregation. The meeting was never formally laid down, though, (Note: This term refers to the formal cessation or closure of a Quaker meeting.) and by 1895 numbers had revived and there were two services on a Sunday.

The first change to the building took place in 1939, when architect Hubert Lidbetter built an extension to the rear, providing kitchens and a classroom at a cost of £400. He then carried out more repairs, including a new roof, in 1961. Lidbetter was a Quaker from Dublin who had started an architectural practice in London in the 1920s and who designed Friends House, the central offices and conference centre for Quakers in Britain. He became "the most influential architect of meeting houses [in the interwar] period" and afterwards (he died in 1966). In 2015, further alterations took place, this time to the design of HMDW architects (job architect Simon Dyson), consisting of internal redecoration and repairs to the roof. This firm had recently completed a substantial renovation of the Grade I-listed Ifield Friends Meeting House.

Horsham Friends Meeting House is one of three surviving 18th-century Friends meeting houses in Sussex, along with Herstmonceux (1734) and Lewes (1784). It was designated a Grade II listed building on 26 July 1974, and is registered for worship in accordance with the Places of Worship Registration Act 1855; its number on the register is 4666. It is very close to Horsham Unitarian Church, another Grade II-listed place of worship built in 1721. The meeting house is one of eight in the West Weald area, covering northwestern West Sussex and southern Surrey. There are services each Sunday morning and Wednesday lunchtime.

== Architecture ==
The Victoria County History of Sussex dates the meeting house to 1786 but states that in its present form it "seems later in style" than that date. The original Sussex edition of the Buildings of England series by Ian Nairn and Nikolaus Pevsner state that it dates from 1834, as does the subsequent (2004) Sussex Extensive Urban Survey, but other sources agree that the meeting house does date from 1786. It represents an example of two trends in Quaker meeting house design in the 18th century, in which "the long-wall meeting house with asymmetrically placed entrance was slowly replaced as a model [by] more symmetrical designs", and there was a tendency to rebuild modest older meeting houses on a larger scale.

The meeting house is built of red brick, laid in the Flemish bond pattern at the front and in English bond on the side walls. Some brickwork on the side walls is glazed. The roof is hipped and laid with tiles. A two-storey cottage built at the same time as the meeting house is attached to the north wall. On the "simple" front (east) elevation, a central entrance porch with an arched doorway and a shallow gabled top is flanked by tall arched sash windows, one on each side. An identical window is in the south wall.

Inside, the main meeting room is tall and nearly square (30 ft 6 in. x 27 ft 6 in.). There are some fixed benches on the walls; other benches have open backs and date from the late 18th century, i.e. contemporary with the meeting house.

== Burial ground ==
The burial ground, at the front (east side) of the meeting house, is no longer in use and has been turned into a garden. The only surviving headstones, both of which have been laid down to form paving slabs, are of the local palaeontologist George Bax Holmes (d. 1887) and his wife, who predeceased him, and another for members of the Saunders family who also died in the late 19th century.

== See also ==
- List of places of worship in Horsham District

== Bibliography ==
- Beevers, David; Marks, Richard; Roles, John (1989). Sussex Churches and Chapels. Brighton: The Royal Pavilion, Art Gallery and Museums. ISBN 0-948723-11-4.
- Elleray, D. Robert (2004). Sussex Places of Worship. Worthing: Optimus Books. ISBN 0-9533132-7-1.
- Haines, Susan (2005). Horsham: A History. Chichester: Phillimore & Co. Ltd. ISBN 1-86077-332-X.
- Harris, Roland B. (October 2004). Horsham Historic Character Assessment Report (PDF). Sussex Extensive Urban Survey (EUS) (1st ed.). East Sussex County Council, West Sussex County Council and Brighton and Hove City Council.
- Nairn, Ian; Pevsner, Nikolaus (1965). The Buildings of England: Sussex. Harmondsworth: Penguin Books. ISBN 0-14-071028-0.
- Skidmore, Chris (2021). Quakers and Their Meeting Houses. Swindon: Liverpool University Press. ISBN 978-1-80085-720-9.
- Stell, Christopher (2002). Nonconformist Chapels and Meeting-houses in Eastern England. Swindon: English Heritage. ISBN 1-873592-50-7.
- Williamson, Elizabeth; Hudson, Tim; Musson, Jeremy; Nairn, Ian (2019). Sussex: West. The Buildings of England. New Haven, Conn., and London: Yale University Press. ISBN 978-0-300-22521-1.
- Windrum, Anthony (1978). Horsham: An Historical Survey. Chichester: Phillimore & Co. Ltd. ISBN 0-85033-284-2.
