= Marehill =

Hamlet in West Sussex, England

Coordinates: 50.95551°N 0.48454°W

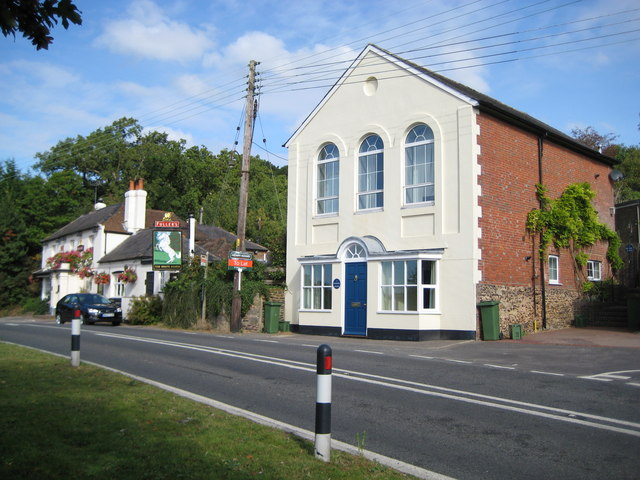
- The White Horse and former chapel

- Location within West Sussex
- OS grid reference: TQ065184
- Civil parish: Pulborough
- District: Horsham
- Shire county: West Sussex
- Region: South East
- Country: England
- Sovereign state: United Kingdom
- Police: Sussex
- Fire: West Sussex
- Ambulance: South East Coast
- UK Parliament: Arundel and South Downs

Marehill is a hamlet in the Horsham District of West Sussex, England. It lies on the A283 road 0.6 miles (1 km) east of Pulborough.
