= Tisman's Common =

Hamlet in West Sussex, England

Coordinates: 51.08268°N 0.47061°W

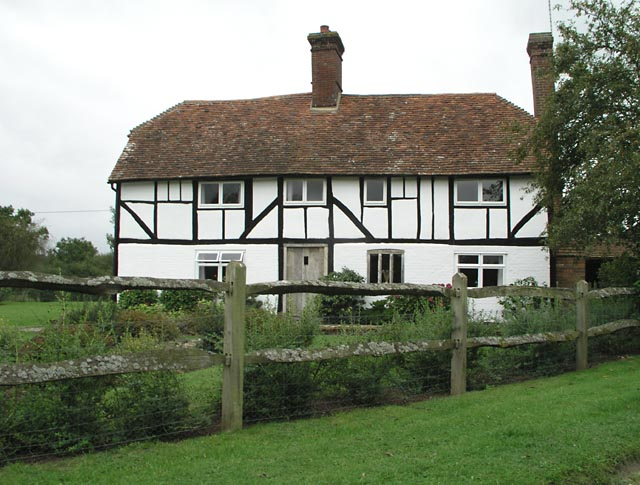
- Barnsfold - one of a number of listed buildings on Tisman's Common

- Location within West Sussex
- OS grid reference: TQ072326
- Civil parish: Rudgwick
- District: Horsham
- Shire county: West Sussex
- Region: South East
- Country: England
- Sovereign state: United Kingdom
- Post town: Horsham
- Postcode district: RH12
- Police: Sussex
- Fire: West Sussex
- Ambulance: South East Coast
- UK Parliament: Horsham

Tisman's Common is a hamlet in the Horsham District of West Sussex, England. It stands in the parish of Rudgwick, on the Rudgwick to Loxwood road, 6.4 miles (10.2 km) west of Horsham.

== History and buildings ==
William Topley's Geology of the Weald notes the common is sited on a bed of sand and Calcareous Grit. Williamson, Hudson, Musson and Nairn, in their 2019 Sussex: West volume of Pevsner’s Buildings of England, describe the setting as "only a few yards from the Surrey border in thick Wealden country". The hamlet was historically part of the Tisman's Estate, centred on Tismans House, a Grade II listed building dating from the early 19th century. In the Victorian period the area was largely divided into a small number of major estates, including Tismans, Hermongers and Pallinghurst, which provided most of the local employment in agricultural activities. The estates were created in the mid-19th century by the (unusually late) enclosures of the commons of Tismans and Exfoldwood. There is a small mission house, St John's, built in the early 20th century as a place of worship for agricultural workers for whom the main church at Rudgwick was too distant, and a pub, The Mucky Duck, originally The Cricketers. Other listed buildings in the hamlet, all designated Grade II, include Barnsfold, originally a pair of labourers’ cottages dating from the 16th century, (Note: In his study of timber buildings of the Weald, Reginald Mason describes Barnsfold as “a perfect example” of a Wealden house with an off-set chimney stack.) Swains Cottage and Little Swains, the former an original hall house dating from the 14th century, and Bucks Cottage.

== Sources ==
- Mason, Reginald Thomas (1964). Framed Buildings of the Weald. Horsham: Coach Publishing House. OCLC 916241803.
- Topley, William (1875). Geology of the Weald. London: HMSO. OCLC 1169974597.
- Williamson, Elizabeth; Hudson, Tim; Musson, Jeremy; Nairn, Ian (2019). Sussex: West. The Buildings of England. New Haven and London: Yale University Press. ISBN 978-0-300-22521-1. OCLC 1107632311.
