= Cowfold =

Village and civil parish in West Sussex

Coordinates: 50.98975°N 0.27256°W

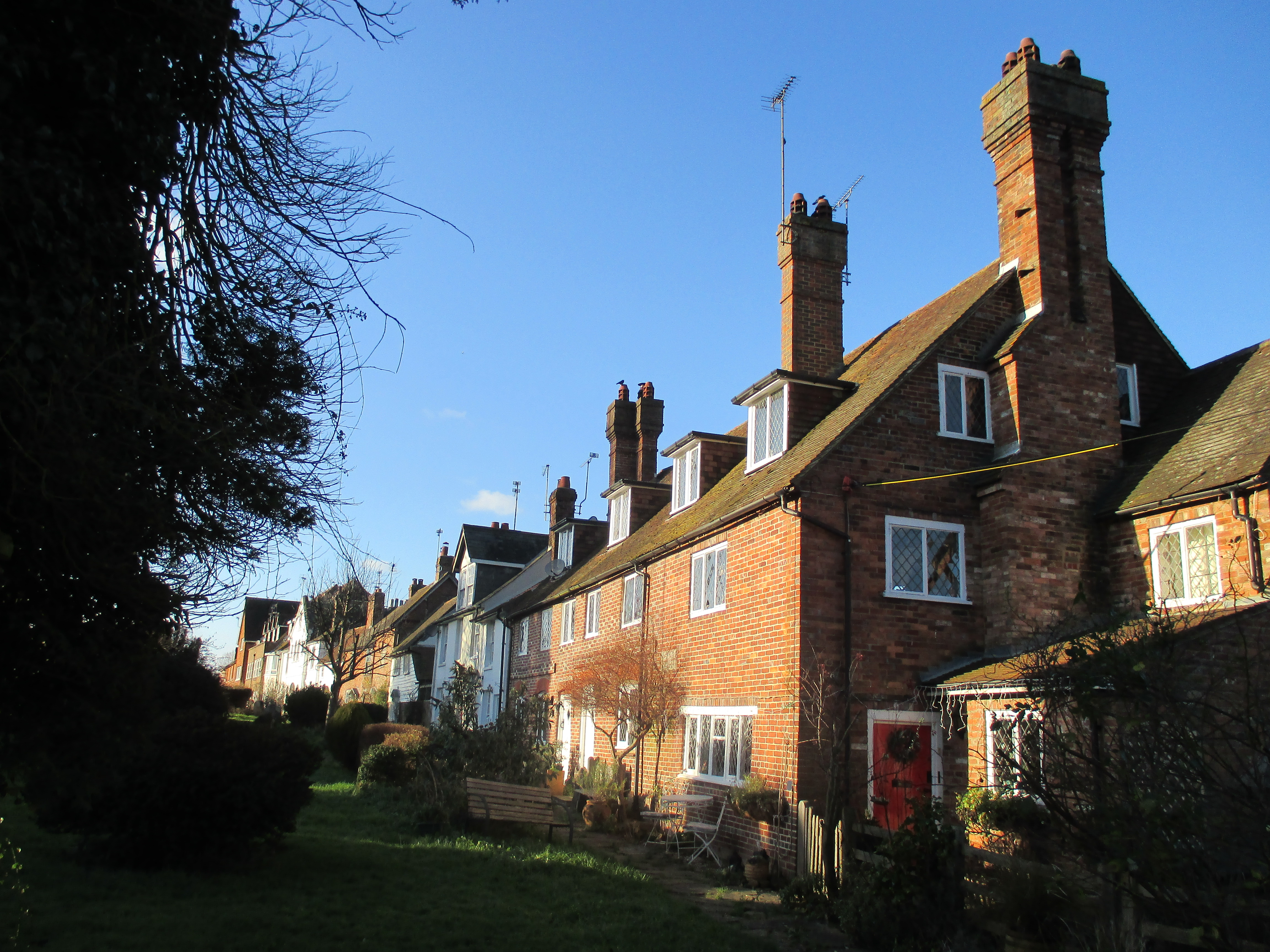

- Location within West Sussex
- Area: 19.26 km^{2} (7.44 sq mi)
- Population: 1,864 2001 Census; 1,904 (2011 Census)
  - Density: 97/km^{2} (250/sq mi)
- OS grid reference: TQ213225
  - London: 36 miles (58 km) N
- Civil parish: Cowfold
- District: Horsham
- Shire county: West Sussex
- Region: South East
- Country: England
- Sovereign state: United Kingdom
- Post town: HORSHAM
- Postcode district: RH13
- Dialling code: 01403
- Police: Sussex
- Fire: West Sussex
- Ambulance: South East Coast
- UK Parliament: Horsham
- Website: http://www.cowfold-pc.gov.uk/

Cowfold is a village and civil parish between Billingshurst and Haywards Heath in the Horsham District of West Sussex, England. The village is at the intersection of the A272 and A281 roads. The parish has a land area of 1,926 hectares (4,760 acres). In the 2001 census 1,864 people lived in 729 households, of whom 987 were economically active. The population at the 2011 Census had risen to 1,904.

== History ==
- In 1927 electricity was made available in the village.
- In 1938 a sewage works was built on the south-east side of the village, and piped water was supplied to houses.
- In 1984 there was a restaurant in the village, and two antique shops.
- In 2014, the Coach House Inn (formerly "The Red Lion"), located next to the north roundabout, closed to make way for a new Co-op food store, and the former Co-op situated in The Village Store was closed.
- In 2018 a new sports pavilion/community facility was erected on the recreational field, on the former site of the old football pavilion, named The Allmond Centre.

== Community ==
The village has a shop, café, Indian restaurant, beauty salon, hairdressers, barbers, VW motor service centre and lawn-mower shop. The 'Hare and Hounds' pub is also to the south of the village. The thirteenth-century Anglican parish church is dedicated to Saint Peter. At Parkminster, to the south of the village, is St. Hugh's Charterhouse, Parkminster, formerly Picknoll Farm, the only post-Reformation Carthusian monastery in the United Kingdom. An Éolienne Bollée there has been restored.

The village has a scout group, which meets in the local scout hut on the playing field, and a guide group, which meets in the school hall.

Cowfold F.C. participate in the West Sussex Premier League, in tier 11 of the English football league system.

=== Village Hall ===
The Cowfold Village Hall opened in 1896 to celebrate Queen Victoria's jubilee, donated to the village by Frederick Du Cane Godman. The hall was built on an old saw pit owned by Fowlers, the local builders, as part of a deal between Godman and Fowlers. As part of the deal, Fowlers occupied a site owned by Godman near the 'Hare and Hounds' pub, and they are still situated there today.

The Village Hall was registered as a charity in 1963.
