= List of monastic houses in West Sussex =

Locations of monastic houses in West Sussex
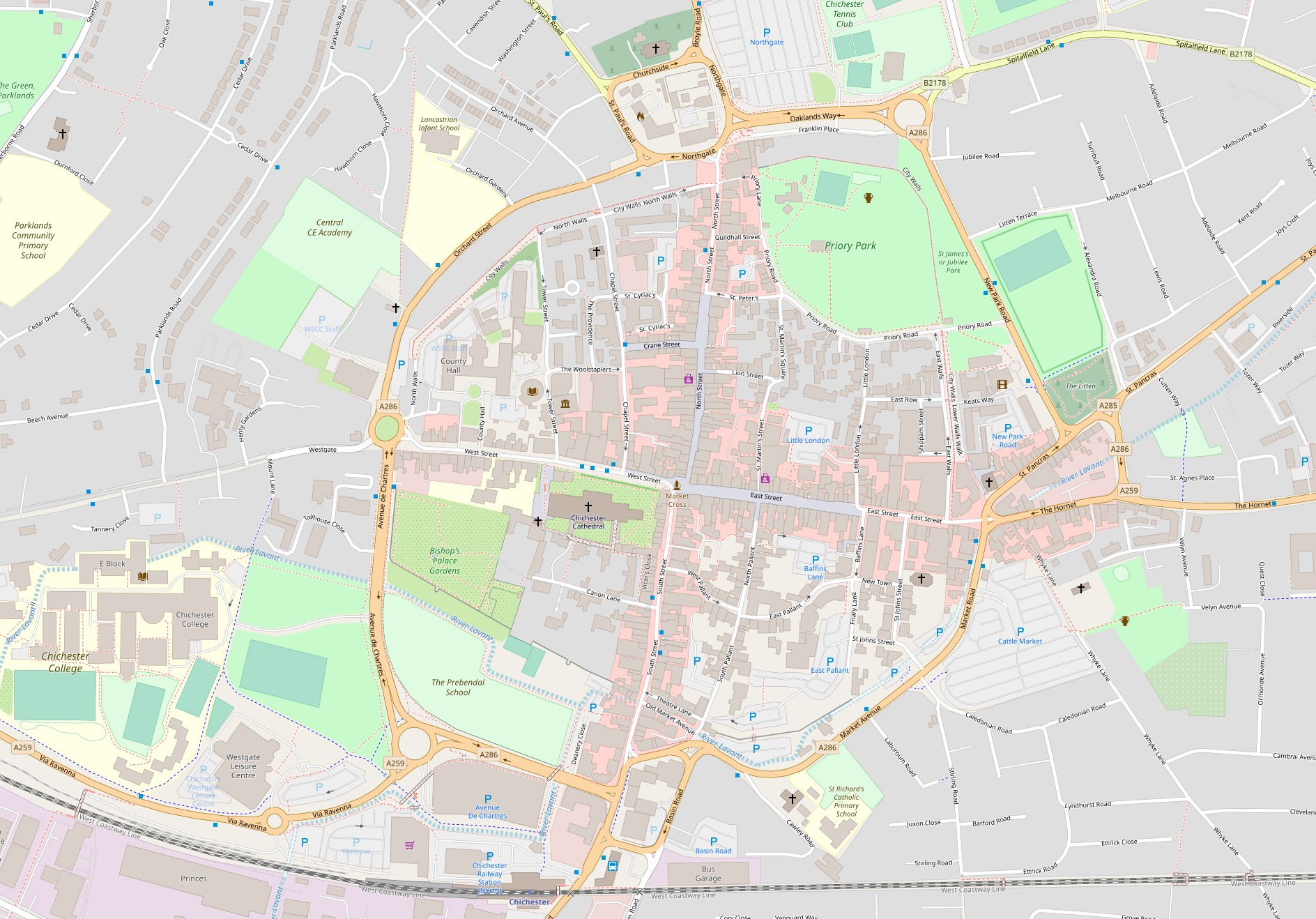
Locations of monastic houses in Chichester
Locations of monastic houses in Arundel

The following is a list of the monastic houses in West Sussex, England.

Alien houses are included, as are smaller establishments such as cells and notable monastic granges (particularly those with resident monks), and also camerae of the military orders of monks (Knights Templar and Knights Hospitaller). Monastic hospitals are included where they had the status or function of an abbey, priory, or preceptor/commandery.

Abbreviations and key

Status of remains
Symbol	Status
None	Ruins
*	Current monastic function
^{+}	Current non-monastic ecclesiastic function (including remains incorporated into later structure)
^	Current non-ecclesiastic function (including remains incorporated into later structure) or redundant intact structure
^{$}	Remains limited to earthworks etc.
^{#}	No identifiable trace of the monastic foundation remains
^{~}	Exact site of monastic foundation unknown
^{≈}	Identification ambiguous or confused

Locations with names in italics indicate possible duplication (misidentification with another location) or non-existent foundations (either erroneous reference or proposed foundation never implemented) or ecclesiastical establishments with a monastic name but lacking actual monastic connection.

Trusteeship
EH	English Heritage
LT	Landmark Trust
NT	National Trust

Foundation	Image	Communities & provenance	Formal name or dedication & alternative names	References & location
Aldingbourne Monastery		grant 692 for monastery and church by King Nothhelm to his sister; endowment transferred to St Wilfrid		
Arundel Blackfriars		Dominican Friars (under the Visitation of London) founded before 1253; dissolved 1538	Arundel Blackfriars	50°51′14″N 0°33′09″W
Arundel Priory, earlier site ^{~}		Benedictine monks alien house: dependent on Séez; land granted to Séez by Roger de Montgomery, Earl of Shrewsbury and Sussex before 1094; monastery established 1102; transferred to site of secular canons (see immediately below) 1177		
Arundel Priory		secular canons founded before 1177; Benedictine monks (community founded at earlier site (see immediately above) 1094); transferred from earlier site 1177, replacing secular canons; alien house: dependent on Séez; monks withdrawn by 1379 secular college 1380 dissolved 1544; remains of the collegiate buildings of the Holy Trinity incorporated into St Winifred's Priory, a 19th-century convent of Servite Nuns which currently occupies the site	The Parish and Priory Church of Saint Nicholas, Arundel	50°51′21″N 0°33′26″W
Atherington Priory		Benedictine monks cell or grange dependent on Séez; founded before 1102(?) dissolved c.1414; granted to Syon after 1414; only chapel remains on site, subsequently in use as sanctuary for the ashes of the Moynes family; reproduction medieval-style structures built on site		50°47′56″N 0°34′45″W
Bosham Monastery		monks founded before 681 by Dicul, Irish monk; became a possession of Osbern, chaplain to Edward the Confessor secular canons — from Plympton collegiate founded c.1121; dissolved c.1553		50°49′43″N 0°51′34″W
Boxgrove Priory ^{+}		secular college before 1066; Benedictine monks alien house: dependent on Lessay founded c.1117 by Robert de la Haye (Haya), Lord of Halnaker; became denizen: independent from after 1339; dissolved 1536; granted to Henry, Earl of Arundel 1560/1; part of church now in parochial use	The Priory Church of Saint Mary the Virgin and Saint Blaise, Boxgrove ____________________; Boxgrave Priory	50°51′36″N 0°42′39″W
Calcetto Priory, Lyminster		Augustinian Canons Regular founded before 1151 (c.1150) by Queen Adelisa, widow of Henry I; dissolved 1525; suppressed by Cardinal Wolsey; granted to Antony Lord Monage 1607/8; remains incorporated into a farmhouse called 'Calcetto'	The Priory Church of Saint Bartholemew, Pynham The Priory Church of Saint Bartholemew and Saint Thomas of Canterbury, Pynham ____________________; Pynham Priory; Pyneham Priory; Priory de Calceto (Priory of the Causeway)	50°50′51″N 0°32′45″W
Chichester Austin Friars		Augustinian Friars former house of the Franscicans, conditionally granted to the Augustinians 1269, but never implemented (see Chichester Greyfriars, earlier site)		
Chichester Blackfriars		Dominican Friars founded before 1280; dissolved 1538; granted to the Mayor and citizens of Chichester 1540/1		
Chichester Greyfriars, earlier site		Franciscan Friars Minor, Conventual (under the Custody of London) founded before 1232; transferred to new site (see immediately below) 1269; site conditionally granted to the Augustinian Friars (see Chichester Austin Friars), but was deemed too close to the Franciscans' new site; granted to St Mary's Hospital 1285; site now occupied by St Mary's Hospital, established here 1269–90, infirmary cubicles converted into apartments		50°50′15″N 0°46′36″W
Chichester Greyfriars		Franciscan Friars Minor, Conventual (under the Custody of London) (community founded at earlier site (see immediately above) before 1232); transferred here 1269; dissolved 8 October 1538; chancel, now located in Priory Park, currently in use as part of the City Museum		50°50′21″N 0°46′36″W
Chichester Priory		secular (collegiate) founded before 956(?), monastery implied from charter by King Edwy, 956; Benedictine? nuns refounded before 1066; nuns removed for canons 1075 when see removed from Selsey to Chichester;	St Nicholas	
Crawley Friary *		Capuchin Franciscan Friars founded 1861; extant	SS Francis and Anthony	51°06′48″N 0°11′16″W
Crawley Down Monastery *		Community of the Servants of the Will of God (Anglican); extant	The Monastery of the Holy Trinity, Crawley Down, Crawley	51°08′03″N 0°04′38″W
Dureford Abbey ^		Premonstratensian Canons - from Welbeck, Nottinghamshire daughter house of Welbeck; founded before 1183 (or 1169, or by 1161) by Henry Husey (Hosat) II, confirmation probably granted March 1161; dissolved 1534–6; granted to Sir William Fitz Williams 1537/8; fragmentary remains incorporated into farmhouse and stable block	The Abbey Church of the Blessed Virgin Mary and Saint John the Baptist, Dureford ____________________; Durford Abbey	51°00′16″N 0°53′32″W
Easebourne Priory ^^{+}		Benedictine nuns founded c.1238 purportedly by Sir John de Bohun of Midhurst; Augustinian Canonesses refounded(?) 15th century; dissolved 1536; granted to Sir William FitzWilliam 1536/7; claustral remains incorporated into house; restored frater now in parochial use	St Mary the Nativity of the Blessed Virgin Mary (early 16th century)	50°59′42″N 0°43′33″W
Farnham Minster		land granted by King Caedwalla for a minster 688; no evidence establishment was founded		
Ferring Monastery (?)		possible Saxon church/chapel or monastery (?) 757-96 (in the reign of Offa)		50°48′26″N 0°27′16″W
Hardham Priory ^		Augustinian Canons Regular founded after 1248(?); dissolved 1534; site currently occupied by farmhouse and garden	St Cross	
Priory of Our Lady of Good Counsel (Sayers Common) *		Canonesses Regular of Windesheim; extant	The Priory Church of Our Lady of Good Counsel	
Lyminster Priory		possible Saxon royal minster (Nonnaminstre); Benedictine nuns or canonesses alien house: cell dependent on Almeneches; founded c.1082(?) by Roger de Montgomery, Earl of Sussex, who granted land to St Peter's Abbey, Almenesches; (now The Parish Church of St Mary Magdalene) dissolved c.1414	St Mary ____________________; Nonnaminstre?	50°50′00″N 0°32′57″W
Poling Preceptory		Knights Hospitaller founded before 1199(?): land granted by Ralph fitz Savarac, Gergaga de Palinges and his son, confirmed by King John; last prior died 1442; dissolved 1445: became part of the holding of the Prior of England 1445	St John's Priory	50°50′27″N 0°30′52″W
Runcton Priory		Benedictine monks founded before 1086; alien house: cell dependent on Troarn: manor granted to Troarn by Roger de Montgomery, Earl of Shrewsbury after 1100(?); dissolved 1260: made over to Bruton, Somerset		50°48′45″N 0°44′48″W
Rusper Priory		Benedictine nuns founded before 1200, probably by a member of the de Braose family: William de Braose was a patron when confirmation granted by Seffrid, Bishop of Chichester; dissolved 1537; granted to Sir Robert Southwell 1537/8; site currently occupied by a house	The Priory Church of Saint Mary Magdalene, Rusper ____________________; Ruspur Priory	50°48′45″N 0°44′48″W
Saddlescombe Preceptory		Knights Templar founded c.1228: manor granted by Geoffrey de Say; dissolved 1308–12; Knights Hospitaller c.1308-12 (in retention of the Earl of Surrey until 1397) possibly merely a camera of Shipley after the suppression of the Knights Templar; extant house named 'Saddlescombe Manor' possibly occupies site		50°53′20″N 0°11′33″W (poss. site)
Sele Priory		secular canons collegiate church founded before 1073 by William de Braose (Braiosa); Benedictine monks alien house: dependent on St-Florent-de-Saumur: granted to St-Florent 1080 by William de Braose; founded before 1126; became denizen: independent from 1396; granted to Magdalen College, Oxford 1459: permission obtained by William Waynflete, Bishop of Winchester; dissolved 1480; buildings occupied by Carmelite Friars (see immediately below) 1493	St Peter; ____________________; Beeding Priory	50°53′15″N 0°18′20″W
Sele Whitefriars		Carmelite Friars - from Shoreham founded 1493: Carmelites occupied the vacant buildings of the Benedictines (see immediately above); dissolved 1538; remains probably incorporated into vicarage built on site 1792	SS Peter and Paul	50°53′15″N 0°18′20″W
Selsey Abbey		Benedictine? monks founded after c.681 by St Wilfrid; episcopal-abbatial diocesan cathedral 709; secular episcopal diocesan cathedral after c.750; see and community transferred to Chichester c.1075; precise location of abbey not known, possibly Church Norton, or submerged by the sea	Selsey Cathedral	50°45′18″N 0°45′55″W or 50°43′17″N 0°47′51″W
Shipley Preceptory		Knights Templar founded c.1128(?): manor and church granted by Philip de Harcourt c.1125 (possibly) or (probably) c.1128; dissolved 1308-12 manor passed to Knights Hospitaller		
Shoreham Camera (?)		Knights Templar manor or camera		
Shoreham Monastery		uncertain order and foundation church granted to St-Florent-de-Saumur 1075–6; rebuilt by the monks of Sele; referred to as collegiate (Note: Shoreham - collegiate: Edmund Sharpe. Com. F. H. Crossley)		50°49′53″N 0°16′36″W; 50°49′55″N 0°16′34″W
Shoreham Whitefriars		Carmelite Friars founded before 1317; dissolved 1493: transferred to Sele; land granted by Sir John de Mowbray in 1348 for the foundation to be extended to the north due to the threat of incursion by the sea; "The Marlipins" have been suggested as the extant remains of the friary	New Shoreham Friary	50°49′53″N 0°16′36″W; 50°49′55″N 0°16′34″W
Shulbrede Priory		Augustinian Canons Regular founded c.1200 by Ralph de Arden; dissolved 1536; granted to Antony Brown 1544/5; site now occupied by private house with limited public access	Wolinchmere Priory; Shulbred Priory	51°03′42″N 0°45′03″W
Sompting Preceptory		church associated with Knights Hospitaller (Note: Sompting - Knights Hospitaller: L.B.Larking, C.S. (1875) The Knights Hospitallers in England, 175) priory mentioned 1425/6 (Note: Sompting - priory: Dugdale (1468) Monasticon Anglicanum, vi, 1624)	Sompting Priory	50°50′19″N 0°21′07″W
Steyning Priory		secular collegiate founded before 858?; Benedictine monks (purportedly (Note: Steyning - Benedictine: Dugdale (1468), Monasticon Anglicanum)); alien house(?): cell of Fécamp(?) refounded(?) c.1042 (or in the reign of William the Conqueror); evidence of Benedictine foundation lacking; continuing in collegiate use until 1283–90; 12th-century church possibly built on site of Saxon minster; ruinous by 1577-8 rebuilt and refurbished; in parochial use as the Parish Church of St Andrew		50°53′24″N 0°19′30″W
St Joseph's Abbey, Storrington ^		rectory built 1871–2; Dominican convent and boarding school 1953; school closed 1999		50.915136°N 0.456469°W
Storrington Priory *		Premonstratensian Canons Regular; Henry Fitzalan-Howard, 15th Duke of Norfolk invited canons to build a monastic house c.1882; foundation stone laid 1902 by Cardinal Bourne, Bishop of Southwark; extant	Our Lady of England Priory, Storrington	50°55′00″N 0°27′36″W
Tortington Priory ^, Storrington		Augustinian Canons Regular founded c.1180 (or in the reign of King John), possibly by Lady Hadwissa Corbet; dissolved 1536; granted to Sir John Spencer 1599/1600; remains incorporated into a barn on a farmyard	The Priory Church of Saint Mary Magdalene, Tortington	50°50′39″N 0°34′18″W
Warminghurst Grange		Benedictine monks alien house: grange dependent on Fécamp founded c.1085; dissolved 1414		
Worth Abbey * Turners Hill, Crawley		Benedictine monks from Downside; Somerset; priory founded 1933; raised to abbey status 1957; extant	The Abbey of Our Lady, Help of Christians	51°05′33″N 0°07′06″W
Worth Minster (?)		possible minster; Saxon church, possibly from before c.1050, size and layout suggests an establishment with more than a parochial function; Parish Church of St Nicholas on site		51°06′37″N 0°08′30″W
Wythering Monastery (?)		evidence from possibly spurious charters of 680 and 685 referring to lands owned by Selsey monastery, including St Andrew's Church on the East side of 'uedringmutha' (Wittering Haven, later called Pagham Harbour) implying a community at Wythering (Pagham) rather than West Wittering, as previously inferred	Pagham Monastery; Wittering Monastery	50°45′57″N 0°45′13″W

== See also ==
- List of monastic houses in England

== Sources ==
- Binns, Alison (1989) Studies in the History of Medieval Religion 1: Dedications of Monastic Houses in England and Wales 1066–1216, Boydell
- Cobbett, William (1868) List of Abbeys, Priories, Nunneries, Hospitals, And Other Religious Foundations in England and Wales and in Ireland, Confiscated, Seized On, or Alienated by the Protestant "Reformation" Sovereigns and Parliaments
- Knowles, David & Hadcock, R. Neville (1971) Medieval Religious Houses England & Wales. Longman
- Morris, Richard (1979) Cathedrals and Abbeys of England and Wales, J. M. Dent & Sons Ltd.
- Thorold, Henry (1986) Collins Guide to Cathedrals, Abbeys and Priories of England and Wales, Collins
- Thorold, Henry (1993) Collins Guide to the Ruined Abbeys of England, Wales and Scotland, Collins
- Wright, Geoffrey N., (2004) Discovering Abbeys and Priories, Shire Publications Ltd.
- English Cathedrals and Abbeys, Illustrated, Odhams Press Ltd.
- Map of Monastic Britain, South Sheet, Ordnance Survey, 2nd edition, 1954
