= History of Christianity in Sussex =

The history of Christianity in Sussex includes all aspects of the Christianity in the region that is now Sussex from its introduction to the present day. Christianity is the most commonly practised religion in Sussex.

== Early history ==
After the Roman conquest of AD 43, the Celtic society of Sussex became heavily Romanised.

The first written account of Christianity in Britain comes from the early Christian Berber author, Tertullian, writing in the 3rd century, who said that "Christianity could even be found in Britain." Emperor Constantine (AD 306-337), granted official tolerance to Christianity with the Edict of Milan in AD 313. Then, in the reign of Emperor Theodosius "the Great" (AD 378–395), Christianity was made the official religion of the Roman Empire.

When Roman rule eventually ceased, Christianity was probably confined to urban communities. At Wiggonholt, on a tributary of the River Arun, a large lead tank with repeated chi-rho motifs was discovered in 1943, the only Roman period artefact in Sussex found with a definite Christian association. It may represent a baptismal font or a container for holy water, or alternatively may have been used by pagans.

== Medieval ==
=== Saxon ===
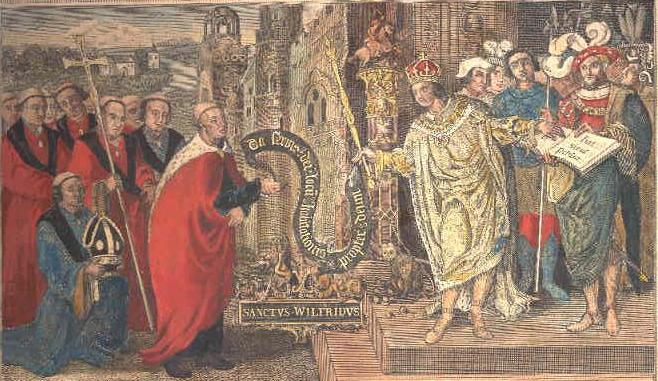
Engraving showing the local Saxon king, Cædwalla, granting land to Wilfrid to build his monastery in Selsey

After the departure of the Roman army, the Saxons arrived and founded the Kingdom of Sussex in the 5th century, bringing with them their polytheistic religion. The Saxon pagan culture probably caused a reversal of the spread of Christianity. The written evidence for the foundation of a bishopric in Sussex comes from The Life of Wilfrid attributed to Stephen of Ripon and Bede's Ecclesiastical History of the English People. Their narrative says that [in about 681] Bishop Wilfrid, who had been expelled from Northumbria, began preaching in Sussex, which up until that point had remained widely heathen. In an obvious exaggeration the Life of St Wilfrid claimed that Sussex "was inaccessible, having a rocky coast and thick forests, which allowed it to maintain its independence". At this point, the local king, Æthelwealh of Sussex, was baptised in Mercia seemingly under the influence of its ruler, Wulfhere. Wulfhere became Æthelwealh's godfather. The date of the baptism is not known for sure but as Wulfhere died in 675, it could be no later than that year. Æthelred of Mercia, who was recorded as ruling in 681 succeeded Wulfhere. Eafe, Æthelwealh's wife, was an aristocratic Christian woman, who originated from Hwicce and it is possible that she may have had a strong influence on his decision to be baptised.

According to Bede, Sussex was the last area of the country to be converted. However it is unlikely that Sussex was wholly heathen when Wilfrid arrived. Some modern academics have questioned the narrative provided by Stephen and Bede. For example, Damianus, a South Saxon, was made Bishop of Rochester in the Kingdom of Kent in the 650s; this may indicate earlier missionary work in the first half of the 7th century. At the time of Wilfrid's mission there was a monastery at Bosham containing a few monks led by an Irish monk named Dicul. Contra to Bede and Stephen's narrative, the historian Michael Shapland suggests that it is possible that on Wilfrids arrival, the people of Sussex would already have been Insular Christians. Wilfrid was a keen supporter of the Roman rites and had no time for the Insular Christians practices. Thus Stephen would have suppressed any reference to the pre-existing church in his "Life of Wilfrid" and Bede in his "History". Therefore Stephen and Bede provide a biased historical account of Wilfrid's "successful" Christianization of Sussex".

Shortly after Æðelwealh granted land to Wilfrid for the church, Cædwalla of Wessex killed Æðelwealh and conquered Sussex. Christianity in Sussex was put under control of the diocese of Winchester. It was not until c. 715 that Eadberht, Abbot of Selsey was consecrated the first bishop of the South Saxons.

St Lewinna, or St Leofwynn, was a female saint who lived around Seaford, probably at Bishopstone around the 7th century. According to the hagiography of the Secgan Manuscript, Lyminster is the burial place of St Cuthflæd of Lyminster. In the late 7th or early 8th century, Cuthman, a shepherd who may have been born in Chidham and had been reduced to begging, set out from his home with his disabled mother using a one-wheeled cart. When he reached Steyning he saw a vision and stopped there to build a church. Cuthman was venerated as a saint and his church was in existence by 857 when King Æthelwulf of Wessex was buried there. Steyning was an important religious centre and St Cuthman's grave became a place of pilgrimage in the 10th and 11th centuries. In 681, Bede records that an outbreak of the plague had devastated parts of England, including Sussex, and the monks at Selsey Abbey fasted and prayed for three days for an end to the outbreak. A young boy with the plague prayed to St Oswald and his prayers were answered, and a vision of St Peter and St Paul was said to have appeared to the boy, telling him that he would be the last to die.

The church built at Steyning was one of around 50 minster churches across Sussex and these churches supplied itinerant clergy to surrounding districts. Other examples are churches at Singleton, Lyminster, Findon and Bishopstone. The jurisdiction of each minster church in the pre-Viking era seems to match early land divisions that were replaced by hundreds in the 10th or 11th centuries. It was not until 200–300 years after Wilfrid that a network of local parish churches existed in Sussex.

Various monastic houses were established in the Saxon period in Sussex including at Selsey Abbey, Lyminster Priory, Aldingbourne, Beddingham, Bosham, Chichester, Ferring and South Malling, near Lewes.

=== Norman and Angevin ===
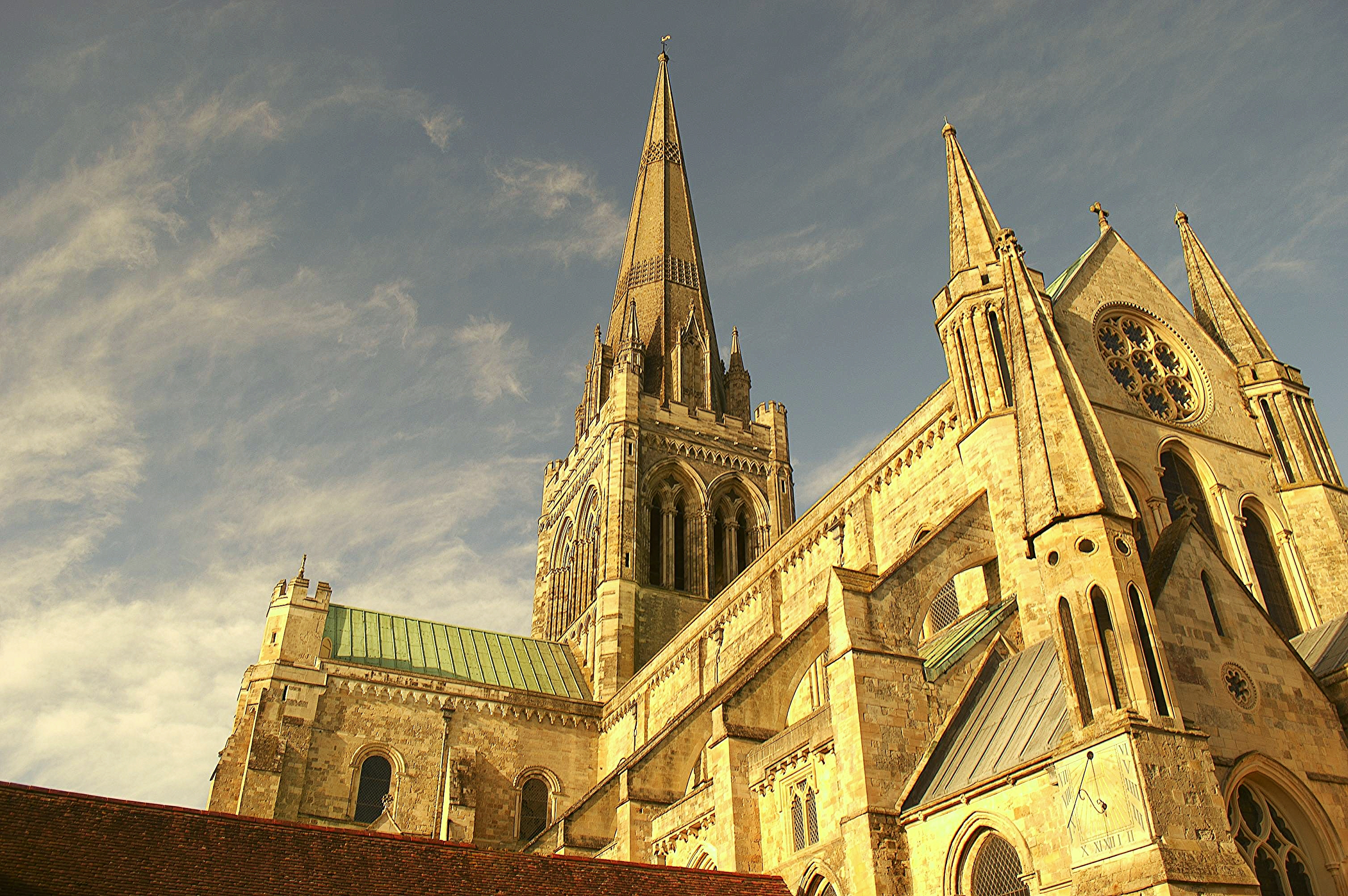
Chichester Cathedral. Following a decree at the Council of London (1075) the See was moved from Selsey to Chichester.

Following the Norman Conquest of 1066, there was a purge of the English episcopate in 1070. The Anglo-Saxon Bishop of Selsey was deposed and replaced with William the Conqueror's personal chaplain, Stigand. During Stigand's episcopate the see that had been established at Selsey was transferred to Chichester after the Council of London of 1075 decreed that sees should be centred in cities rather than vills. 1094 saw the completion of Battle Abbey, which had been founded on the site of the Battle of Hastings after Pope Alexander II had ordered the Normans to do penance for killing so many people during their conquest of England. Monks also planned out the nearby town of Battle shortly after the conquest. Many of the monastic houses of this period were founded by Sussex's new Norman lords. Around 1081, the lord of Lewes Rape, William de Warenne and his wife Gundrada formed England's first and largest Cluniac monastery at Lewes Priory. The lord of Arundel Rape, Roger de Montgomerie established Arundel Priory in 1102. Sele Priory in the Rape of Bramber was founded by the Braose family by 1126.

Bishop Ralph Luffa is credited with the foundation of the current Chichester Cathedral. The original structure that had been built by Stigand was largely destroyed by fire in 1114.

The medieval church also set up various hospitals and schools in Sussex, including St Mary's Hospital in Chichester (c. 1290-1300); St Nicholas' Hospital in Lewes, which was run by the monks of Lewes Priory; and the Prebendal School close to Chichester Cathedral.

The archdeaconries of Chichester and Lewes were created in the 12th century under Ralph Luffa.

Sussex has strong links with the Knights Templar and the Knights Hospitaller including at Shipley, Poling and Sompting.

In the 13th century, Richard of Chichester was canonised as a saint, and a shrine dedicated to him at Chichester Cathedral became an important place of pilgrimage. St Richard later became Sussex's patron saint.

In 1450 Adam Moleyns became the first and only bishop of Chichester to be assassinated. Troops had been gathered to send to the war in France, but bad weather delayed their departure, and troops raided several towns along the coast. Moleyns was sent to Portsmouth to pay troops their outstanding wages, but was beaten so severely by the mob of soldiers that he died.

There is very little evidence of Lollardy in Sussex in the 15th century. Only one person was burnt to death as a Lollard, Thomas Bageley. Goring argues that pockets of Lollardy existed in the High Weald for over a century before Henry VIII's break with Rome. Lollards tended to congregate near diocesan boundaries so that they could flee across the boundary to safety. Reginald Pecock, bishop of Chichester from 1450–1459, was accused of heresy and only saved his life by privately and publicly renouncing his opinions.

== Early modern ==
During this period Sussex has been described "as an anomaly: a southern county with a religious dynamic more in keeping with those of the north, connected to the Continent as much as the rest of the country, an entity that resisted easy co-option into Elizabeth I's 'little Israel of England'." Rye was probably the most Protestant of all Sussex towns, gaining a reputation as a 'godly commonwealth' well before the end of Henry VIII's reign. There was also strong opposition to the imposition of mass by Mary I.

=== The Reformation ===
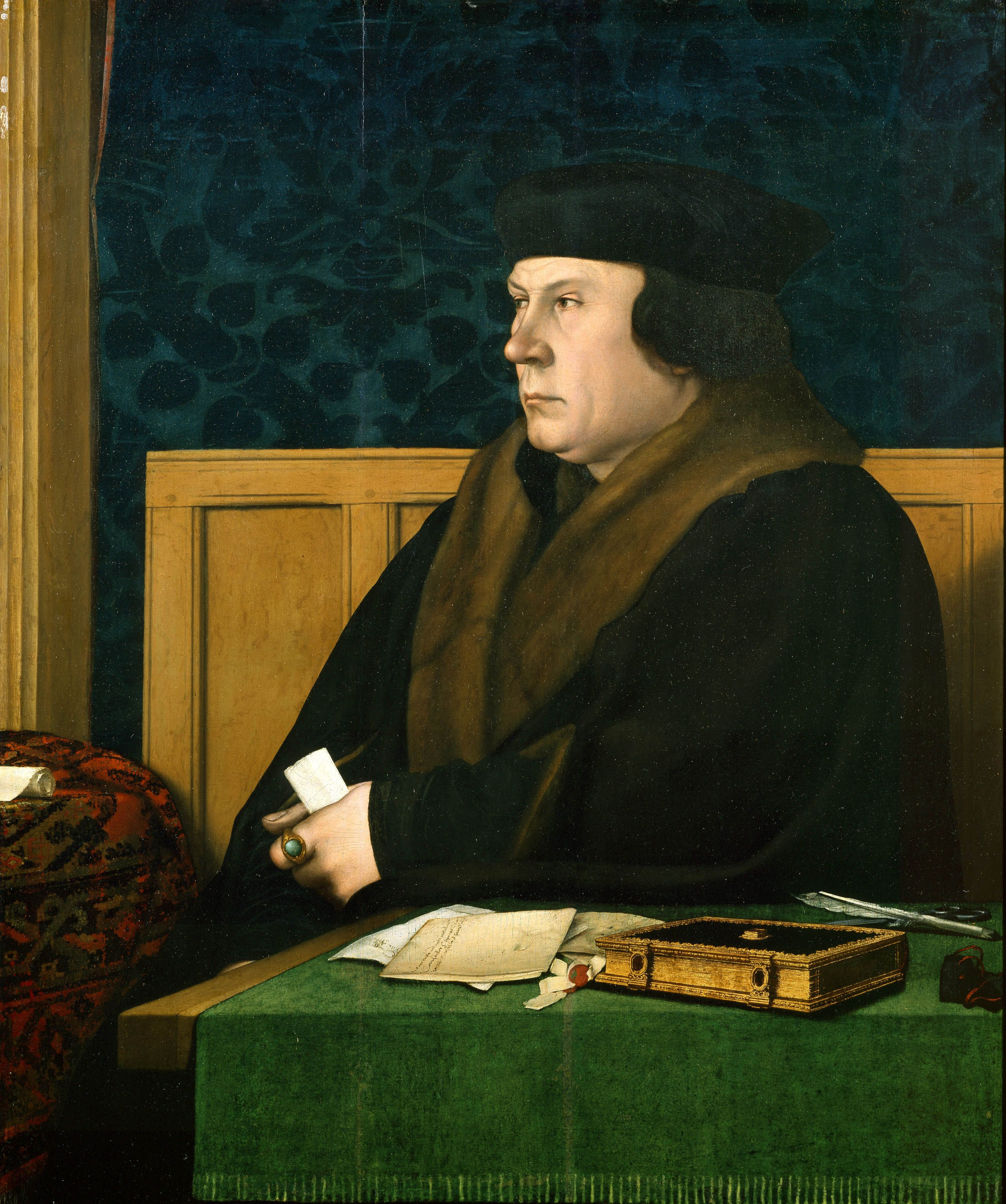
Sir Thomas Cromwell vicar-general

As in the rest of the country, the Church of England's split with Rome during the reign of Henry VIII was felt in Sussex. In 1535, the king appointed Sir Thomas Cromwell as vicar-general. Cromwell visited Sussex later in 1535, as part of his national census of churches and monasteries. The census was intended to enable the more efficient taxing of church property. The following year, an Act was passed that decreed the dissolution of monasteries with an income of less than £200 per annum. This first phase was followed by the "voluntary" surrenders of the larger houses. Lewes Priory with Battle, was the first house in England, during the Dissolution, to surrender on a voluntary basis. The monks surrendered the house in November 1537 in return for either being given a small pension or a living as a priest. The site and possessions of Lewes Priory were granted to Henry VIII's vicar-general, Thomas Cromwell, who passed Lewes Priory to his son, Gregory Cromwell. Sussex did not do too badly compared to the rest of the country, as it only had one person in 500 who was a member of a religious order, compared to the national average of one in 256.

In 1538 there was a royal order for the demolition of the shrine of St Richard of Chichester in Chichester Cathedral. Thomas Cromwell saying that there was "a certain kind of idolatry about the shrine".

Richard Sampson, Bishop of Chichester, incurred the displeasure of Cromwell and ended up imprisoned in the Tower of London at the end of 1539. Sampson was released after Cromwell's fall from favour and execution in 1540. Sampson then continued at the see of Chichester for a further two years. He was succeeded as Bishop of Chichester by George Day. Day opposed the changes, and incurred the displeasure of the royal commissioners, who promptly suspended him as Bishop and allowed him only to preach in his cathedral church.

Henry VIII died in 1547; his son Edward VI continued on the path that his father had set. However his reign was only short-lived as he died after only six years.

The bishops of Chichester had not been in favour of the Reformation until the appointment of John Scory to the episcopate in 1552. During Henry VIII's reign two of the canons of Chichester Cathedral had been executed for their opposition to the Reformation, and during Edward VI's reign George Day was ultimately imprisoned for his opposition to the reforms.

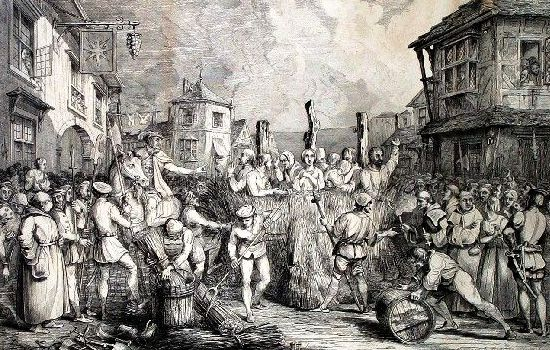
Depiction of martyrdom of Richard Woodman and nine others who were burned to death in Lewes. This 19th-century etching, by James Henry Hurdis, is said to have begun the cult of the Sussex martyrs

==== Reign of Mary I ====
There had been twenty years of religious reform when the Catholic Mary Tudor succeeded to the throne of England in 1553. Mary expected her clergy to be unmarried, so Bishop Scory thought it prudent to retire as he was a married man, and George Day was released and restored to the see of Chichester.

Mary's persecution of Protestants earned her the nickname "Bloody Mary". Nationally about 288 Protestants were burnt at the stake during her reign, including 41 in Sussex. Most of the executions in Sussex were at Lewes. Of these 41 burnings, 36 can be identified to have come from specific parishes, and the place of execution is known for 27 of them; because the details of the executions were recorded in the Book of Martyrs by John Foxe, published in 1563. Martyrs included Deryck Carver, a French-speaking Flemish man who had sought refuge in Brighton from persecution for his Calvinist beliefs; and Richard Woodman, an ironmaster from Buxted. There are Bonfire Societies in Sussex that still remember the 17 Protestant martyrs that burned in Lewes High Street, and in Lewes itself they have a procession of martyrs' crosses during the bonfire night celebration. According to Quinn, the authorities in Sussex during Mary's reign were rather less bloodthirsty than is generally assumed, often allowing their opponents to slip the noose when they could. Carver's meetings had been attended by many fishermen from both England and France, beginning the tradition of French Christian worship in Brighton.

There was a range of Protestant beliefs in Sussex during the reign of Queen Mary. Sussex's proximity to the Continent left it particularly exposed to European Protestantism, while its proximity to large parts of the Weald also left it open to pre-Reformation Protestantism. This was particularly so in the east of the county, with its trade links to Protestant areas of northern Europe and it covering a large part of the Weald, as well as being close to the Kentish border.

==== Reign of Elizabeth I ====
When Mary died in 1558, she was replaced by her Protestant sister Elizabeth I. Elizabeth re-established the break with Rome when she passed the 1559 Acts of Supremacy and Uniformity: the clergy were expected to take statutory oaths, and those that did not were deprived of their living. In the county nearly half the cathedral clergy and about 40% of the parish clergy had to be replaced, although some of the vacancies were due to ill health or death.

A case can be made for the Reformation as a religious phenomenon only arriving in Sussex with Bishop Richard Curteys from 1570. In the west, Curteys' reforms were hampered by the noble Catholic families, and in the east by more radical forms of Protestantism. Until then the loyal but conservative bishops Sherborne, Sampson and Day did not appear to enforce doctrinal orthodoxy. Through the influence of Richard Curteys, the Reformation in Sussex took on a Puritan tone from the 1570s and a tradition of 'radical parochialism' developed with well-educated preachers supporting ministers, often sponsored by Puritan landowners. Curteys circumvented the existing clergy by bringing in 'lecturers' or unbeneficed clergy who provided a new preaching tradition, and also gathered some existing clergy who were sympathetic to his aims. This was particularly strong in the Lewes area, in part because of its European trade links.

During the 1570s Puritan Christian names like "Feregod" became common in the Weald. Far from the seat of the Bishop of Chichester, radical towns like Rye and Lewes became "free-thinking" Protestant towns, and numbers of Protestants increased, with Huguenots seeking refuge after the St Bartholomew's Day massacre in France. In the 1560s and 1570s, there was a trend for giving Puritan children "godly" names, especially in East Sussex, signifying a Puritan counter-culture. Eighteen parishes in the east of Sussex record Puritan names, the highest concentration of which was in Warbleton, where around half the children were given Puritan names between 1587 and 1590. Such Puritan names included "Be-courteous Cole" (in Pevensey), "Safely-on-High Snat" (in Uckfield) and "Fight-the-Good-Fight-of-Faith White" (in Ewhurst. One child with a Puritan name, Accepted Frewen, later became Archbishop of York. Many Sussex Puritans emigrated across the Atlantic Ocean to New England, accounting for about 1% of New England's immigrants. Puritan migrants from other English regions, such as East Anglia, had much lower usage of hortatory names, and Puritans in the US state of Massachusetts followed the East Anglian rather than the Sussex naming custom.

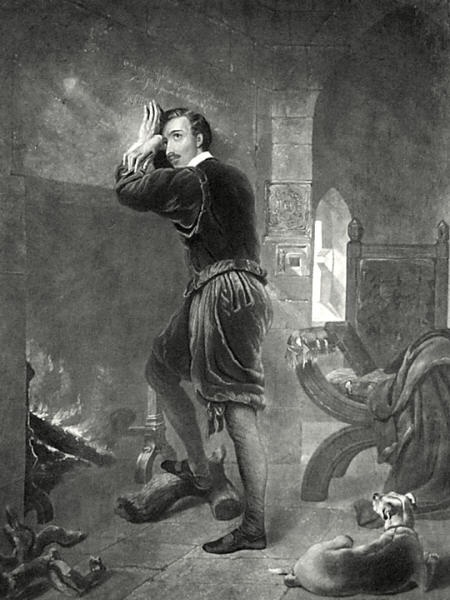
19th-century depiction of Philip Howard in the Tower of London, one of the Forty Martyrs of England and Wales

In the late 16th century, Sussex was a complicated and divided region. The countryside was largely Catholic, dominated by the ancient Catholic families: the Howards at Arundel, the Percys at Petworth House, the Gages at Firle, the Brownes (the Lords Montague) at Cowdray Park, the Palmers at Parham House, as well as other minor dynasties like the Carylls, Lewkenors, Shelleys and Kemps. At the start of Elizabeth's reign all six of Sussex's noble families were Catholic. The towns, including Rye and Lewes, were more likely to be controlled by Protestants if not Protestant in orientation. The Earl of Arundel, Henry FitzAlan had considerable influence as Lord Steward of the Royal Household, privy councillor and Lord Lieutenant of Sussex (1559-1569) until he was involved in the Ridolfi plot to marry his son-in-law, Thomas, Duke of Norfolk, to Mary Queen of Scots. Even after the 1580s when restrictions on Catholics were imposed, Sussex continued to be led by Catholic peers. The office of sheriff of Sussex was held by Catholics eleven times between 1558 and 1603.

At the end of Elizabeth's reign, Catholicism continued to be tolerated. On the death of her husband, Lady Montague withdrew to Battle Abbey, the family's seat in the east of the county. The establishment of what became known as "Little Rome" became a focal point for the local Catholic community, with as many as 120 people attending Mass. This shows that long-standing political loyalty by Catholics was repaid by a form of toleration.

The Catholic Sussex families which suffered imprisonment or financial ruin at this time were mostly those that were involved in conspiracies against Elizabeth. After the uprising of 1569, the eighth Earl of Northumberland was effectively sent into internal exile in Sussex, at his home at Petworth House. After 1577, central authorities mounted on a growing attack on Catholic recusants, forcing them to abandon apparent conformity at a greater cost. Fines for non-attendance at an Anglican church were increased from 12d per week to 20 pounds per month. In 1580 leading Sussex Catholics including John Gage of Firle and Richard Shelley of Warminghurst were imprisoned for recusancy and continued to pay the taxes and fines demanded. In 1583 Charles Paget was smuggled into England, meeting William Shelley at Patching to discuss a plan to land Spanish, German and Italian troops in Sussex and march to Petworth House, the home of Northumberland, and Arundel Castle, while a second force would land in Lancashire and be joined by an uprising of English Catholics. Shelley's and Northumberland's actions reveal there was some truth in the suspicions directed against Sussex Catholics.

With further legislation in the 1580s, Sussex Catholics caught harbouring priests were guilty of treason. Significantly, no member of the Sussex gentry or nobility was ever charged under these laws, and neither was there ever any uprising, even though there was a significant Catholic community in Sussex. In this, the west of Sussex was out of step with the rest of England, just as attempts to impose a "Godly magistracy" in Rye in the east of the county was out of step with the rest of Protestant England. During this period Sussex was often different from the rest of England, with east and west of the county often inversions of each other. West Grinstead Park, home of the Caryll family, became a Roman Catholic mission where priests arrived, generally at night up the River Adur to await "posting". he River Adur was extensively used by the many Catholics travelling covertly between London and the Continent. Thomas Pilchard was executed in 1587 for being a priest and Edward Shelley of Warminghurst died at Tyburn in London in 1588 for hiding a priest. In 1588 two Catholic priests, Ralph Crockett and Edward James, were arrested at Arundel Haven (now Littlehampton), taken to London and executed outside Chichester. Philip Howard, 20th Earl of Arundel, who was canonised in 1970 as one of the Forty Martyrs of England and Wales, spent much of his life at his family home of Arundel Castle. From a family of Catholic recusants, Howard was imprisoned in the Tower of London for leaving the country without the permission of Queen Elizabeth. He died there ten years later. Early in the 17th century, Bosham-born Benedictine priest, George Gervase, was executed in London.

=== 17th century ===
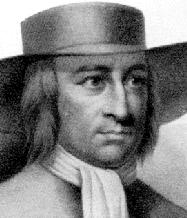
19th-century engraving of George Fox

In the 17th century, the diocese of Chichester was home to several Arminian bishops, including Bishops Andrewes, Harsnett, Montagu, Duppa and King.

In the 1620s and 1630s many communities had licensed preachers. Lectureships at Rye, Lewes, Horsham and Midhurst extended preaching to the towns with the full support of the local gentry. From this time, Sabbatarianism gained ground with suppression of games and disorder. Bishop Montagu put forward extreme views against Puritanism and stressed the importance of ritual. Anthony Stapley, chairman of the Michaelmas quarter sessions in Sussex, was persuaded by Puritans to develop a harangue against the bishops in 1639, and in 1641 Stapley and Thomas Pelham petitioned Parliament on this issue. Latent hostility towards Catholics increased; and although Sussex contained as large a proportion of recusant households as many of the northern counties, few Catholic gentry in the county openly supported the king.

There were no battles of national significance in Sussex, during the 1642–1651 English civil war; however there were small sieges at Chichester and Arundel. The west of the county was generally royalist, although Chichester was for parliament and the east of the county, with some exceptions, was also for parliament. A few churches were damaged, particularly in the Arundel area. Also, after the surrender of Chichester, the Cathedral was sacked by Sir William Wallers parliamentary troops. Bruno Ryves, Dean of Chichester Cathedral said of the troops that "they deface and mangle [the monuments] with their swords as high as they could reach". He also complained that Waller's troops...

"... brake down the Organs and dashing the pipes with their Pole-axes..."
Mercurius Rusticus p. 139

Destruction of the cathedrals' music seems to have been one of the objectives, as Ryves also said, of Waller's men, that...

"they force open all the locks, either of doors or desks wherein the Singing-men laid up their Common-Prayer Books, their singing-Books, their Gowns and Surplesses they rent the Books in pieces and scatter the torn leaves all over the Church, even to the covering of the Pavement.."
Mercurius Rusticus p. 140

In 1643, Francis Bell, one of the priests at the Catholic mission in West Grinstead, was executed, along with other priests. The Caryll family were frequently persecuted and fined.

During Cromwell's interregnum, Rye stood out as a Puritan 'Common Wealth', a centre of social experiment and rigorous public morality under vicar Joseph Beeton and his successor John Allen. The people of Rye seem in general to have ignored the strict sabbatarianism enforced by the constables, particularly where 'immoderate drinking' was concerned.

==== Sussex Quakers and emigration to British North America ====
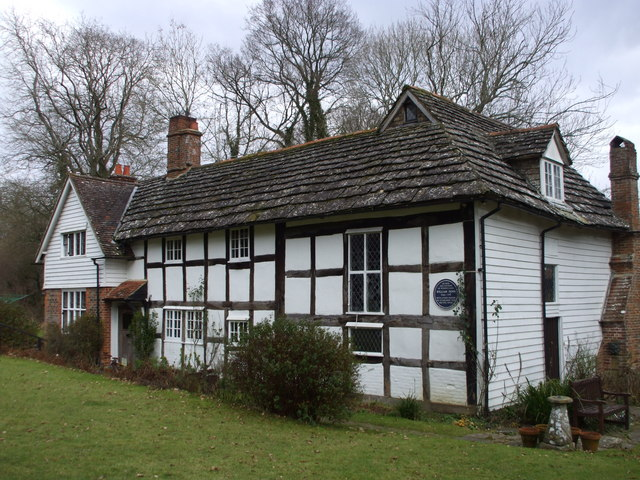
The Blue Idol Friends' Meeting House near Coolham was the place of worship of many Sussex Quakers who emigrated across the Atlantic, including William Penn.

About a quarter of the incumbents were forced from their parishes and replaced with Puritans. Many people turned away from the traditional churches and in 1655 George Fox founded the Society of Friends at Horsham. Quakerism emerged in Sussex in the 1650s, to be firmly suppressed by a gentry concerned about its revolutionary tendencies. In 1656, Thomas Haycock of Horsham became the first person in Sussex to be sent to gaol for their Quaker beliefs. William Penn lived in the county for a while; in 1676 he bought the estate of Warminghurst, near Steyning. In 1677 a huge open air meeting of Quakers was held at Penn's home in Warminghurst in defiance of the law, with several hundred Quakers attending. Then in 1681 Charles II granted Penn lands in what became Pennsylvania and Delaware. Amongst those whom he carried to Pennsylvania as colonists were 200 people from Sussex. In 1682 Penn left the Kent port of Deal for the Province of Pennsylvania with about 100 passengers, mostly Quakers and mostly from Sussex. Quakers to leave Sussex for Pennsylvania included Samuel Carpenter who founded Horsham Township, Pennsylvania; and in 1677 William Clayton left for Pennsylvania, where his family founded with others a township they called Chichester, and opened the Chichester Friends Meetinghouse. Penn also created Sussex County and renamed the settlement of Hoernkills as Lewes.

Following the Rye House Plot of 1683 a new wave of religious persecution swept across England. Until the passing of the Toleration Act received royal assent in 1689 Quakers in Sussex and elsewhere had suffered considerable persecution, many of whom were imprisoned in Horsham Jail. While living at Warminghurst, Penn too was persecuted for his Quaker faith. The 1684 Chichester Quarter Sessions recorded that William Penn "being a factitious and seditious person doth frequently entertain and keep an unlawful assemblage and conventicle in his dwelling house at Warminghurst to the terror of the King's liege people." Penn sold the estate, at Warminghurst, to a James Butler in 1707.

The Quakers in Sussex debated with Matthew Caffyn, a General Baptist preacher and writer, including George Fox and William Penn. There is a well-known account in 1655 when two Quakers from the north of England, Thomas Lawson and John Slee, disputed doctrine with Caffyn. As a result of their debates, Lawson produced a pamphlet entitled An Untaught Teacher Witnessed Against (1655) and Caffyn produced a pamphlet Deceived and Deceiving Quakers Discovered, Their Damnable Heresies, Horrid Blasphemies, Mockings, Railings (1656). in 1696, Caffyn's increasingly radical, unorthodox beliefs caused a schism in the General Baptist Assembly, and its response to his changing theology was significant in the development of Unitarianism. The attorney-general of Rye, Samuel Jeake was exiled from the town after being found guilty of preaching under the Five Mile Act 1665. He was forced to remain outside of Rye until 1687 when the toleration which James II extended to Protestant dissenters enabled him to return to Rye.

The Restoration of the English monarchy began in 1660 under Charles II. It took over a year, after the restoration of Charles II in May 1660, for Chichester cathedral to get its choir back to full strength.

In the late 17th century, Sussex was a stronghold of the General Baptists.

In 1676 the Sussex parishes with the highest proportion of Catholics were almost entirely in the two most westerly Rapes of Chichester and Arundel: at least ten per cent of the population were Catholic in the parishes of Burton, Clapham, Coates, Midhurst, Racton, Shipley and Westfield.

In 1678 a former Hastings rector, Titus Oates fabricated the "Popish Plot", a supposed Catholic conspiracy to assassinate King Charles II and replace him with James (later James II). The plot led to the false implication, imprisonment and execution of William Howard. As a 'Catholic of distinction' the seventh John Caryll from Sussex was imprisoned in the Tower of London but was let out on bail. Following the persecutions and executions that followed the Titus Oates plot, the death penalty for being a priest was removed. Instead, unscheduled fines were doubled and all remaining civil rights were removed from people keeping the Roman Catholic faith. At this stage, most Sussex Catholic families conformed to the Anglican church, except notably for the Caryll family. In 1688 the seventh John Caryll went into exile to Saint-Germain in France with James II as private secretary to James' queen, Mary of Modena.

== Late modern ==
=== 18th century ===
There was a significant decline in non-conformity in Sussex in the early 18th century. Between 1676 and 1724 the strength of non-conformity in the county was reduced by at least one quarter. Around a third of the parishes in Sussex in 1724 had no dissenters. For instance in 1676, Horsham had over 100 non-conformists but by 1724 there were just 34.

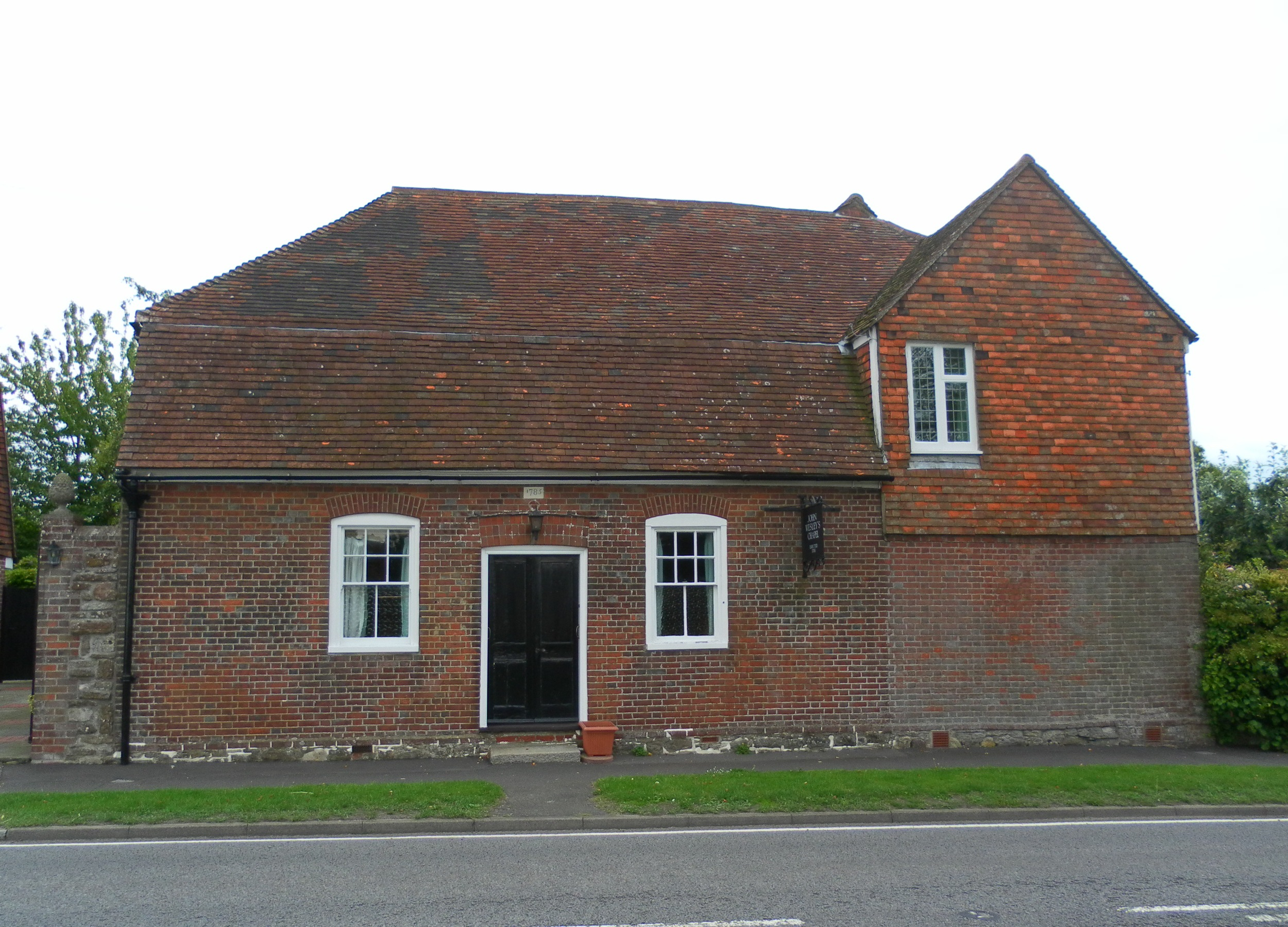
Co-founder of the Methodist Church, John Wesley preached at Winchelsea Methodist Chapel in 1789 and 1790

The number of dissenters fell from 4,300 in 1676 to around 3,300 in 1724. In the 18th century, the Sussex grocer, Thomas Turner left a diary which suggests a high level of theological literacy amongst laypeople. At this time, the Sussex Weald and bordering towns such as Lewes were home to a number of fundamentalist sects. Cade Street Chapel in Heathfield was founded in 1769 for the followers of George Gilbert, who was popularly styled as 'The Apostle of Sussex'. Gilbert also preached in surrounding villages, often with great hardship and difficulty: at Ticehurst he was pelted with stones when the bells rang; at Bexhill he was plastered from head to toe in filth, and a large drum was played to drown out the sound of his voice until a woman put a knife into the drum.

Under Caffyn's guidance a General Baptist chapel was founded in Horsham in 1719, bringing together Baptists who had met in small house-groups in the town since 1669 or possibly as early as 1645. Worshippers from across northern Sussex came to this chapel; many were from the village of Billingshurst a few miles away. This group later became large enough to split from the Horsham congregation and establish a chapel in their home village.

Methodist pioneers came to the Rape of Hastings in 1756, with John Wesley visiting Rye in 1758. Wesley's last open air sermon was held in nearby Winchelsea in 1790. The Countess of Huntingdon's Connexion's first church was set up in 1761 in North Street, Brighton in what was originally Selina, Countess of Huntingdon's garden.

Map of the historic counties of England showing the percentage of registered Catholics in the population in 1715–1720. The map shows Sussex had the highest percentage of any southern county.

Sussex had a significantly larger proportion of Catholics than other southern counties. Between 1715 and 1720, 8 per cent of the population of Sussex were registered as Catholic, a proportion more in common with counties north of a line from the River Severn to the Wash. John Baptist Caryll, the last of the Caryll family, was penalised for his Catholic faith and was forced in 1754 to sell his Sussex homes including that at West Grinstead. He endowed the Priest's House to the Catholic Church via Lewes-born bishop Richard Challoner so that Catholic mass could be continued in the locality. When Challoner visited the West Grinstead Mission in 1741 he found 80 Catholics at Mass. Finally, history cannot forget the famous recusant, Maria Fitzherbert, who during this period secretly married the Prince of Wales, prince regent, and future George IV in 1785. The British Constitution, however, did not accept it and George IV later moved on. Cast aside by the establishment, she was adopted by the town of Brighton, whose citizens, both Catholic and Protestant, called her "Mrs. Prince." According to journalist, Richard Abbott, "Before the town had a [Catholic] church of its own, she had a priest say Mass at her own house, and invited local Catholics", suggesting the recusants of Brighton were not very undiscovered.

=== 19th Century ===
==== Roman Catholic Church ====
Brighton's Roman Catholic community at the time of the Relief Act was small, but two factors caused it to grow in the 1790s. Many refugees from the French Revolution settled in Brighton after escaping from France; and Maria Fitzherbert, a twice-widowed Catholic, began a relationship with the Prince Regent (and secretly married him in 1785 in a ceremony which was illegal according to the Act of Settlement 1701 and the Royal Marriages Act 1772). She accompanied the Prince Regent whenever he visited Brighton, and had her own house (Steine House on Old Steine).

The first Catholic place of worship since the Reformation in Brighton was established above a shop in 1798; it was one of the earliest in Britain. In 1805 the priest in charge, a French émigré, started to raise money for a permanent building; a site on High Street, east of the Royal Pavilion and Old Steine, was found, and the Classical-style church was completed in 1807. It was demolished in 1981.

In 1818 the new rector, a friend of Maria Fitzherbert, wanted to extend the church. Mrs Fitzherbert donated £1,000 for this purpose, but before any action could be taken the events of 1829, when Catholic emancipation was fully achieved, encouraged Brighton's Catholic community to seek a new site for a larger, more elaborate church. A piece of undeveloped land on the estate of the Marquess of Bristol was bought for £1,050, and William Hallett, later a mayor of Brighton, designed and built the new church of St John the Baptist. It was consecrated on 7 July 1835 and opened on 9 July 1835. Many of the 900 Catholic churches opened in England since the 1791 Roman Catholic Relief Act had not been consecrated by that stage, so St John the Baptist's was only the fourth new church to be consecrated in England since the Reformation in the 16th century.

Founded in 1873, St Hugh's Charterhouse, Parkminster, is the first and only post-Reformation Carthusian monastery in the United Kingdom. In 1876 the Shrine Church of Our Lady of Consolation of West Grinstead was established, becoming the first Catholic shrine in honour of Mary to be established in England since the Reformation. Sussex was covered by the new Roman Catholic diocese of Southwark, created in 1850. New priests for the Catholic diocese of Southwark began to train at West Grinstead until they could move to a larger domestic property at Henfield. The diocese then moved its seminary to a purpose-built seminary in Surrey.

==== Non-conformist churches ====
Despite Methodism's early progress around Rye and Winchelsea in the Rape of Hastings, Methodism took longer to gain ground in the rest of Sussex. Methodism in the coastal towns of Sussex had a very unusual origin in that it was Methodists in the army who were the main or contributory founders of Methodism in towns from Chichester to Bexhill, including Lewes. Michael Hickman has argued that it was not until 1803 when Methodists and others in the army were allowed to worship freely on Sundays that Methodist soldiers could support or found Methodist societies in Sussex. 1805 saw the timber-framed Jireh Chapel open in Lewes, for Calvinist William Huntington whose tomb is at the rear of the chapel.

The General Baptist congregations at Billingshurst, Ditchling and Horsham gradually moved from General Baptist beliefs towards Unitarianism in the early 19th century.

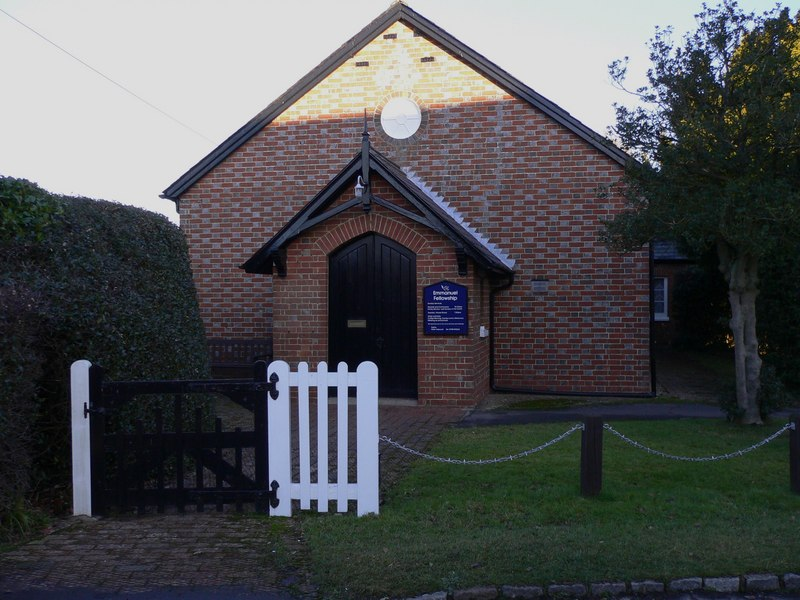
This meeting room in Loxwood was the centre of a small sect called the Society of Dependants, nicknamed the Cokelers; it remained open until the 1980s when it was used by another Christian group

In the mid 19th century John Sirgood founded the Society of Dependants at Loxwood in the north of the county. Nicknamed the 'Cokelers' their beliefs were largely derived from Wesleyan Arminianism. They believed in the people's ability to exercise free will and thereby achieve salvation rather than the Calvinistic assertion of predestination. They first established themselves at Loxwood because it was outside of the control of the large estates whose Anglican owners would have denied them land or premises. As well as at Loxwood, the Society of Dependants went on to found places of worship at Chichester, Hove, Northchapel and Warnham, as well as at three locations in Surrey.

==== 1851 census ====
In 1851 the authorities organised a census of places of worship in England and Wales. The figures for Sussex indicated that there were more Anglican than non-conformist places of worship. In the neighbouring counties of Hampshire and Kent, there were more non-conformist places than Anglican.

Sussex Places of Worship 1851; Table based on figures in Census of Great Britain 1851. Religious Worship..
Denomination	Places of Worship
Church of England	350
Independents	78
Baptists	40
Society of Friends	5
Unitarians	5
Methodists	75
Isolated Congregations^{*}	32
Roman Catholics	8
Catholic and Apostolic	1
Latter Day Saints	2
Jewish	1
* Isolated Congregations do not belong to any particular sect and are independent of each other.

The 1851 census shows that the Anglican church was particularly strong in the west of the county. These were areas where settlements were predominantly nucleated, with small parishes. Thakeham had the second highest rate of Anglicans in England (96% Anglican). Steyning, Petworth, Westhampnett and Westbourne were also over 80% Anglican. Anglican churches did well in the coastal towns including Brighton. In parts of the Sussex Weald the Anglican church had fewer churches than many other denominations, but not in terms of attendances at these churches.

Just over 40% of the places of worship in Sussex in 1851 were non-conformist, mainly Independents, Wesleyan Methodists and Baptists. There were also smaller congregations of Catholics, Quakers, Countess of Huntingdon's Connexion and Unitarians. Non-conformist chapels did well particularly in the Weald.

Old dissent - dating back to Lollardy, such as Baptists, Unitarians and Quakers - remained more popular than new dissent and could be seen particularly in the Weald and on the Downs. It was particularly noticeable in the towns such as Brighton, Shoreham, Hastings and Rye. Some parts of Sussex were areas of strength for Baptists, but the west was an area of relative weakness. Overall in Sussex, Wesleyan Methodism had some of the fewest adherents in Sussex in all of England. However Wesleyan Methodism was strong in the rape of Hastings along the border with Kent; it was weakest in the county west of Eastbourne. Primitive Methodists were almost absent from Sussex.

Primitive Methodists were almost completely absent from Sussex. Of the 44 Sussex parishes with Catholics in 1676, only two, Arundel and Slindon, also had a Catholic place of worship in 1851.

==== Anglo-Catholic reform in the Anglican Church and subsequent protest ====
In the mid 19th century, divine Frederick William Robertson became well-known and preached at the Holy Trinity Church, Brighton.

Formed in the 19th century, the cult of the Sussex martyrs was instigated at a time of the restoration of the Catholic hierarchy in England, bolstered by an increase in the Irish Catholic population, as well as the high-profile conversion to Catholicism of members of the Oxford movement, including Cardinal Newman and former Archdeacon of Chichester, Henry Edward Manning. Mark Antony Lower, an anti-Catholic propagandist and schoolmaster from Lewes, inaugurated the cult of the Sussex martyrs after the publication of his 1851 book The Sussex Martyrs to recall the dire actions of Catholicism in Sussex. Hostility to the Roman Catholic church, strong shortly after the Reformation had virtually died out by the early 19th century when religious tolerance was dominant mood. This began to change with the Evangelical Revival. The first Methodists to preach in Lewes were Calvinist Methodists, who saw the world as a sharp contrast between good and evil, God and the devil. The natural recipients of their negative projections were Catholics, who were becoming tolerated in England. More petitions were to come out of Lewes against Catholic emancipation that any other town in southern England. They came not from the old dissenters who favoured toleration but from the newly-formed Calvinist congregations. The local press in Lewes pandered to these prejudices. The introduction of ritualist practices in the Anglican church further increased anti-Catholic attitudes in Lewes.

In the mid 19th century the practice of burning an effigy of Pope Paul V at the Lewes Bonfire celebrations began. Paul V was a peaceable man who happened to be pope at the time of the Gunpowder Plot in 1605 and who cannot be held responsible for the Gunpowder Plot or the persecution of Protestants in the reign of Mary I, which were linked at this time by a misunderstanding of the past. In 1893 William Richardson, rector of the Southover district of Lewes, held sermons on the Sunday before 5 November warning about the perils of Catholicism. Many attendees were members of the newly-formed Orange Lodge in Lewes.

At the end of the 19th century and beginning of the 20th century, memorials were erected across Sussex and several other English counties to honour people burnt to death as heretics in the reigns of Henry VIII and Mary I. These were largely a reminder of religious divisions of more than three centuries earlier which seemed remote from the public preoccupations of the day. The actions could only be seen an anti-Catholic or at least anti-papal. Whilst moderate supporters did not wish to offend the Catholic community, a memorial in Heathfield read "burnt to death at Lewes by the Roman Catholics". These monuments did not commemorate the martyrdoms of Catholics or the Protestant opponents of state-imposed orthodoxy, except where they were erected by nonconformists. Anger was directed against the Anglo-Catholic community more than Catholics.

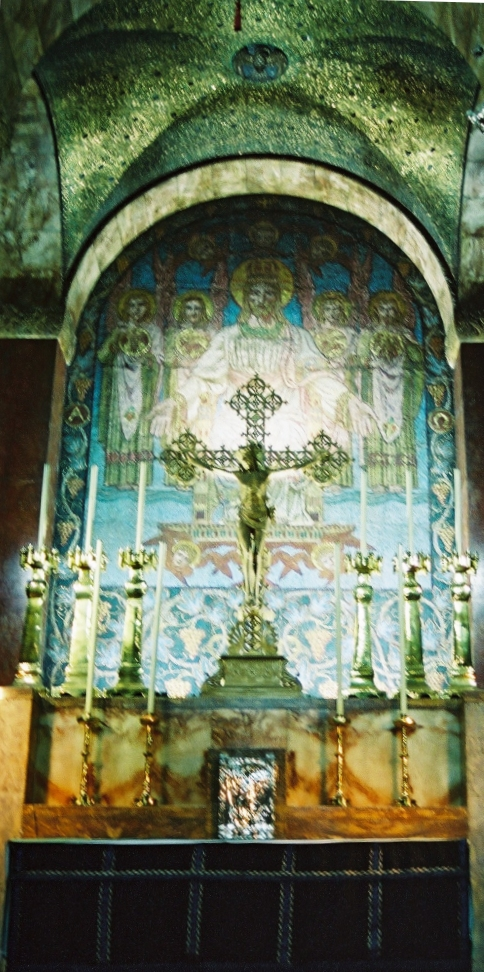
Interior of St Bartholomew's Church in Brighton, one of the churches at the heart of Sussex's Anglo-Catholic movement

In the Anglican church in the 19th century, the role of ritual became subject of great, often heated, debate. In Brighton the Anglican church became influenced by the Oxford Movement, to an extent unparalleled elsewhere in the country apart from London. In Anglo-Catholic circles, Brighton became associated with London, as in the collective title of "London-Brighton and South Coast Religion", a play on the name of the main railway company in Victorian Sussex, the "London, Brighton and South Coast Railway". The railway, coincidentally or otherwise, linked all the large and growing centres of Anglo-Catholic worship spreading from London to Brighton and then east and west along coast of Sussex to the neighbouring counties of Kent and Hampshire. Anglo-Catholic priests in Brighton, included Henry Michell Wagner whose churches included St Paul's Church and there was a powerful Protestant reaction including a riot in 1880. Brighton vicar Rev John Purchas was charged and ritualism spread to churches in Hastings and Worthing. Various militant Protestant groups formed branches and lodges across the county. Richard Enraght was also tried, arrested and imprisoned. The prolific Anglo-Catholic hymnologist John Mason Neale was attacked by a mob and hostile demonstrations ensued at East Grinstead.

In 1884 rioting ensued in Worthing, Eastbourne and Shoreham as mobs of people including members of the Skeleton Army reacted to Salvation Army criticism.

=== Contemporary Christianity ===
==== Church of England ====
In the Church of England in Sussex, the administration of the diocese of Chichester which covers the county was changed in 1912. In addition to the existing archdeaconries of Chichester and Lewes that date from the 12th century, a third archdeaconry of Hastings was created. This structure remained in place until the archdeaconries were reorganised under Eric Kemp in 1975. The archdeaconry of Hastings was dissolved and merged back into the archdeaconry of Lewes, which was renamed the archdeaconry of Lewes and Hastings. A new archdeaconry was created in the north of the county - the archdeaconry of Horsham. This structure remained until 2014 when the archdeaconry of Hastings was recreated in the east of the county and the archeaconry of Lewes and Hastings was renamed the archdeaconry of Brighton and Lewes. The suffragan Bishop of Horsham oversees the archdeaconries of Chichester and Horsham, while the suffragan Bishop of Lewes oversees the archdeaconries of Brighton & Lewes and Hastings. The bishop of Chichester retains oversight over the entire diocese of Chichester i.e. all of Sussex.

On 16 November 2001, Pat Sinton, became the first woman priest in Sussex to be ordained. Sinton was ordained by John Hind, the bishop of Chichester, following the departure of the previous bishop of Chichester, Eric Kemp. Although Kemp had encouraged women to serve in the permanent diaconate in his diocese he had been an opponent of the ordination of women to the priesthood and women priests were not licensed in the Diocese of Chichester during his episcopate. In September 2014 Fiona Windsor was made archdeacon of Horsham, making her the first female archdeacon in Sussex. The Church of England in Sussex was damaged by sexual abuse scandals in the early 2000s.

==== Roman Catholic Church ====
In 1900 the Roman Catholic nun Maude Petre began a friendship with the Jesuit priest George Tyrell, which resulted in Petre building a cottage for Tyrell in the garden of her Storrington home. Both Petre and Tyrell were major figures in the Modernist controversy of the early 20th century. The Roman Catholic Diocese of Arundel and Brighton was formed in 1965 out of part of the diocese of Southwark. It includes Sussex and Surrey. In the early 2000s, the sexual abuse scandal in the Arundel and Brighton diocese hurt the public's trust in the work of local diocesan officials.

==== Relations with Sussex churches ====
Appointed as Bishop of Chichester in 1929, George Bell was a vocal supporter of the German resistance to Nazism and a pioneer of the Ecumenical Movement that aimed for greater co-operation between churches. Bell established in 1955 the first ever County Council of Churches in Sussex, since which similar structures have been formed in other parts of England.

There is a history of religious antagonism and anti-popery around the bonfire celebrations in Lewes. In the 1930s the mayor of Lewes requested that 'no popery' banners be removed and an end to the burning of effigies of Pope Paul V. In the 1950s the Cliffe Bonfire Society was banned from the Bonfire Council from taking part in the United Grand Procession for its refusal to stop carrying a 'no popery' banner and banners commemorating the 16th century Protestant martyrs burned at Lewes. In Lewes, women were to a significant degree responsible for using the spirit of ecumenism to build bridges between the denominations that had until then continued to be anti-Catholic. In 1984 Sussex church leaders were invited to Lewes to discuss Protestant-Catholic relations. Attendees included Eric Kemp, Bishop of Chichester, Peter Ball, suffragan Bishop of Lewes and Cormac Murphy-O'Connor, Bishop of Arundel and Brighton, as well as their equivalent positions in the Baptist, Methodist and United Reformed churches. In a historic gesture after the meeting the leaders walked to the Martyrs' memorial and prayed for peace and reconciliation. The owners of the memorial, associated with Jireh Chapel, subsequently threatened the intruders for trespassing. The LDCC later persuaded BBC to make a Songs of Praise TV programme in Lewes on the theme of religious tolerance, broadcast on 5 November 1989. To many though, the bonfire celebrations have lost much of their religious meaning, with many Catholics taking part. There are parallels with the carnival celebrations that took place across western Europe when the established order was turned upside down and the lord of misrule held sway for the day. In 1981 Ian Paisley visited Lewes on Bonfire Night and tried to fan the flames of conflict by handing out anti-Catholic pamphlets. His intervention back-fired and the following year he was burned in effigy. Today, anti-Catholic attitudes are rare and the militant Calvinism that continues in Northern Ireland is all but extinct in Lewes.

In the 21st century, controversy continues to be associated around the Bonfire societies and competing definitions of tradition and bigotry. For instance, the burning in effigy of Pope Paul V was described in 2012 as "a scandalous piece of stone-cold bigotry"

==== Other Christian denominations ====
Established in 1971 the Anabaptist Bruderhof community was founded near Robertsbridge, the earliest such community remaining in Europe. From the 1980s, Sussex has three Greek Orthodox churches - at Brighton, Hastings and Eastbourne.

Following the Second Sudanese Civil War, many refugees came to Brighton and Hove and neighbouring areas. Hove and Worthing are now home to Coptic Orthodox Churches, two of 28 such churches in the British Isles. The churches were visited in 2017 by Pope Tawadros II of Alexandria and Bishop Paula of Tanta. In 1998 the congregation at Jireh Chapel in Lewes took the decision to affiliate with the Free Presbyterian Church of Ulster. The church is one of seven such churches established in England.

In the Old Roman Catholic Church in Europe in 2012, Jerome Lloyd was made Metropolitan Archbishop of Selsey (officially "Archbishop Metropolitan of the Isle of the Seals (Selsey) and the New Market of the Regnenses (i.e. of the Celtic tribe the Romans conquered in AD43, now called Chichester) in the Kingdom of the South Saxons (i.e. Sussex)". The archbishop works on various projects to help homeless people in Brighton.

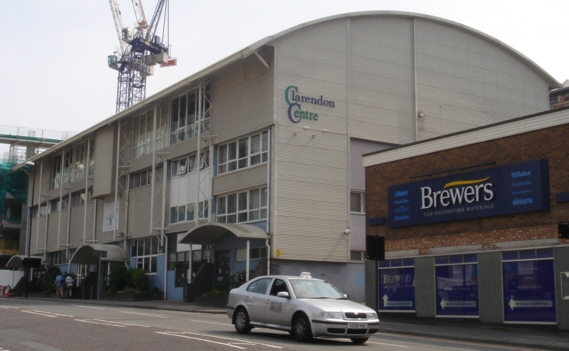
The 800-capacity Clarendon Centre in Brighton is one of a number of large warehouse-style buildings used as churches

The turn of the 21st century saw the rise of so-called mega-churches and neo-charismatic and evangelical churches including Kingdom Faith in Horsham, set up by Colin Urquhart and the Newfrontiers group founded by Terry Virgo.

==== Current and former places of worship ====
Lists of all current and former places of worship in Sussex by district are as follows:

- Adur District
- Arun District
- Brighton and Hove
- Chichester (current)
- Chichester (former)
- Crawley
- Eastbourne
- Hastings
- Horsham District
- Lewes District
- Mid Sussex
- Rother
- Wealden (current)
- Wealden (former)
- Worthing

== See also ==
- History of Christianity in England
- History of Sussex
- Religion in Sussex
- List of monastic houses in East Sussex
- List of monastic houses in West Sussex
- History of local government in Sussex

== Bibliography ==
- Bennett, David Malcolm (2003). The General: William Booth, Volume 2. Xulon Press. ISBN 978-1594672064.
- Brandon, Peter (2006). Sussex. London: Phillimore. ISBN 978-0-7090-6998-0.
- Chamberlain, Scott (1997). Accommodating High Churchmen: The Clergy of Sussex, 1700-1745. University of Illinois Press. ISBN 978-0252023088.
- Dale, Antony (1989). Brighton Churches. London: Routledge. ISBN 0-415-00863-8.
- Dimmock, Matthew; Quinn, Paul; Hadfield, Andrew (2013). Art, Literature and Religion in Early Modern Sussex. Ashgate Publishing. ISBN 978-1472405227.
- Elleray, D. Robert (2004). Sussex Places of Worship. Worthing: Optimus Books. ISBN 0-9533132-7-1.
- Fincham, Kenneth; Lake, Peter (2006). Religious Politics in Post-Reformation England: Essays in Honour of Nicholas Tyacke. Boydell and Brewer. ISBN 978-1843832539.
- Fischer, David Hackett (1989). Fischer: Albion's Seed. Oxford University Press. ISBN 978-0199743698.
- Flint, John; Kelly, John (2013). Bigotry, Football and Scotland. Edinburgh University Press. ISBN 978-0748670390.
- Goffart, Walter (2012). The Narrators of Barbarian History(ad 550-800). Notre Dame: University of Notre Dame. ISBN 978-0-268-02967-8.
- Goring, Jeremy (2003). Burn Holy Fire: Religion in Lewes since the Reformation. James Clarke and Co. ISBN 978-0718830403.
- Higham, N.J. (1997). The Convert Kings: Power and Religious Affiliation in Early Anglo-Saxon England. Manchester University Press. ISBN 0-7190-4828-1.
- Hickman, Michael R. (2005). "The role of soldiers in the origins of Wesleyan Methodism in Brighton and other towns on the Sussex Coast" (PDF). Sussex Archaeological Collections. 143: 257–266. doi:10.5284/1086763.
- Kelly, S.E. (1994). "The Bishopric of Selsey". In Hobbs, Mary (ed.). Chichester Cathedral: An Historic Survey. Chichester: Phillimore. ISBN 0-85033-924-3.
- Kirby, D.P. (1978). "The Church in Saxon Sussex". In Brandon, Peter (ed.). The South Saxons. Chichester: Phillimore. ISBN 0-85033-240-0.
- Mayr-Harting, Henry (1991). The Coming of Christianity to Anglo-Saxon England. Pennsylvania State University Press. ISBN 0-271-00769-9.
- Mursell, Gordon (2001). English Spirituality: From 1700 to the Present Day. Westminster John Knox Press. ISBN 978-0664225056.
- Phillips, A.D.M.; Smith, C.B. (2014). The South East from 1000 AD. Routledge. ISBN 978-1317871705.
- Rudling, David; Russell, Miles (2015). Bignor Roman Villa. The History Press. ISBN 978-0750964784.
- Rushton, Neil S. (1999). "Parochialization and patterns of patronage in 11th-century Sussex" (PDF). Sussex Archaeological Collections. 137: 133–152. doi:10.5284/1086268.
- Shapland, Michael (2023). Kaminski, Jamie (ed.). "Selsey Cathedral and the Early Medieval Kingdoms of Sussex". Sussex Archaeological Collections. 161. Lewes: Sussex Archaeological Society. ISSN 0143-8204.
- Smith Futhey, John; Cope, Gilbert (1995). History of Chester County, Pennsylvania, with Genealogical and Biographical Sketches. Chester County, Pennsylvania USA: Heritage Books. ISBN 978-0788402067.
- Snell, K.D.M.; Ell, Paul S. (2000). Rival Jerusalems: The Geography of Victorian Religion. Cambridge University Press. ISBN 978-0521771559.
- Stell, Christopher (2002). Nonconformist Chapels and Meeting-houses in Eastern England. Swindon: English Heritage. ISBN 1-873592-50-7.
- Stephanus, Eddius (1985). The life of Bishop Wilfrid. Cambridge [Cambridgeshire]; New York : Cambridge University Press. ISBN 978-0-521-30927-1.
- Welch, Martin (1978). "Early Anglo-Saxon Sussex". In Brandon, Peter (ed.). The South Saxons. Chichester: Phillimore. ISBN 0-85033-240-0.
- Wickins, Peter (2013). Victorian Protestantism and Bloody Mary. Arena Books. ISBN 978-1906791957.
- Wragg, Stefany (2022). Early English Queens, 650–850. Taylor & Francis. ISBN 9781-0005-9522-2.
