= Religion in Sussex =

Religion in Sussex has been dominated over the last 1,400 years by Christianity. Like the rest of England, the established church in Sussex is the Church of England, although other Christian traditions exist. After Christianity, the religion with the most adherents is Islam, followed by Hinduism, Buddhism, Judaism and Sikhism.

Sussex is sometimes referred to as 'Silly Sussex', for silly is a corruption of Old Saxon saelig meaning 'holy'.

The historic county has been a single diocese after St Wilfrid converted the kingdom of Sussex in the seventh century. Historically, the west of the county has had a tendency towards Catholicism while the east of the county has had a tendency towards non-conformism. The county has been home to several pilgrimage sites, including the shrine (at Chichester Cathedral) to St Richard of Chichester which was destroyed during the Reformation, and the more recent Catholic shrine at West Grinstead. During the Marian persecutions, several Sussex men were martyred for their Protestant faith, including 17 men at Lewes. The Society of Dependants (nicknamed the Cokelers) were a non-conformist sect formed in Loxwood. The Quaker and founding father of Pennsylvania, William Penn worshipped near Thakeham; his UK home from 1677 to 1702 was at nearby Warminghurst.

Sussex is connected with several saints, including St Wilfrid, sometimes known as the 'Apostle of Sussex'; St Cuthman of Steyning; St Cuthflæd of Lyminster; St Lewina; St Richard of Chichester, Sussex's patron saint; St Philip Howard, Earl of Arundel; and James Hannington. In folklore, Mayfield and Devil's Dyke are linked with St Dunstan, while West Tarring has links with St Thomas a Becket.

A wide variety of non-traditional religious and belief groups have bases in and around East Grinstead. The UK headquarters of the Church of Scientology is situated at Saint Hill Manor, formerly the home of the group's founder, L. Ron Hubbard. In 2011 Mid Sussex had the highest proportion of Scientologists per head of any district in England and Wales. Opus Dei, the Rosicrucian Order and the Pagan Federation also have bases nearby. The UK's first temple of the Church of Jesus Christ of Latter-day Saints (the Mormons) lies 3 miles (5 km) north of East Grinstead, just over the Surrey border.

== Statistics ==
Religion in Sussex (2011)
1. Christianity (57.8%)
2. Non-religious (30.5%)
3. Not stated (8.00%)
4. Other religions (1.50%)
5. Islam (1.40%)
6. Hinduism (0.70%)

The statistics for current religion (not religion of upbringing where also asked) from the 2011 census are set out in the tables below.

| Religion (2011) | Brighton and Hove | | East Sussex local authority area | | East Sussex ceremonial county | | West Sussex | | Sussex | | England | | United Kingdom | |
| Religion (2011) | Number | % | Number | % | Number | % | Number | % | Number | % | Number | % | Number | % |
|---|---|---|---|---|---|---|---|---|---|---|---|---|---|---|
| Christianity | 117,276 | 42.9 | 315,659 | 59.9 | 432,935 | 54.1 | 498,367 | 61.8 | 931,302 | 57.8 | 31,479,376 | 59.4 | 37,583,962 | 59.5 |
| Islam | 6,095 | 2.2 | 4,201 | 0.8 | 10,296 | 1.2 | 12,668 | 1.6 | 22,964 | 1.4 | 2,660,116 | 5.0 | 2,786,635 | 4.4 |
| Hinduism | 1,792 | 0.7 | 1,501 | 0.3 | 3,293 | 0.4 | 7,368 | 0.9 | 10,661 | 0.7 | 806,199 | 1.5 | 835,394 | 1.3 |
| Sikhism | 342 | 0.1 | 178 | 0.0 | 520 | 0.1 | 1,137 | 0.1 | 1,657 | 0.1 | 420,196 | 0.8 | 432,429 | 0.7 |
| Judaism | 2,670 | 1.0 | 1,074 | 0.2 | 3,744 | 0.5 | 1,434 | 0.2 | 5,178 | 0.3 | 261,282 | 0.5 | 269,568 | 0.4 |
| Buddhism | 2,742 | 1.0 | 2,190 | 0.4 | 4,932 | 0.6 | 3,057 | 0.4 | 7,989 | 0.5 | 238,626 | 0.5 | 261,584 | 0.4 |
| Other religion | 2,409 | 0.9 | 3,508 | 0.7 | 5,917 | 0.7 | 4,121 | 0.5 | 10,038 | 0.6 | 227,825 | 0.4 | 262,774 | 0.4 |
| Total non-Christian religion | 16,050 | 5.9 | 12,652 | 2.4 | 28,702 | 3.6 | 29,785 | 3.7 | 58,487 | 3.6 | 4,614,244 | 8.7 | 4,848,384 | 7.7 |
| No religion | 115,954 | 42.4 | 155,723 | 29.6 | 271,677 | 34.0 | 216,844 | 26.9 | 488,521 | 30.5 | 13,114,232 | 24.7 | 16,221,509 | 25.7 |
| Religion not stated | 24,089 | 8.8 | 42,637 | 8.1 | 66,726 | 8.3 | 61,896 | 7.7 | 128,622 | 8.0 | 3,804,104 | 7.2 | 4,528,323 | 7.2 |
| No religion and Religion not stated | 140,043 | 51.2 | 198,360 | 37.6 | 338,403 | 42.3 | 278,740 | 34.5 | 617,143 | 38.3 | 16,948,836 | 32.0 | 20,749,832 | 32.8 |
| Total population | 273,400 | 100.0 | 527,200 | 100.0 | 800,200 | 100.0 | 808,900 | 100.0 | 1,609,100 | 100.0 | 53,012,456 | 100.0 | 63,182,178 | 100.0 |

== Christianity ==
=== History ===
==== Romano-British ====
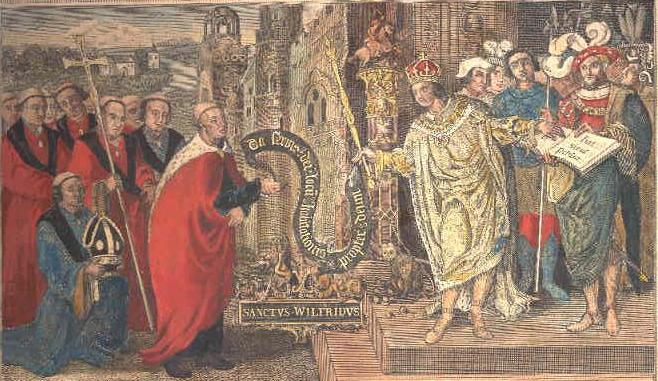
Engraving showing the local Saxon king, Cædwalla, granting land to Wilfrid to build his monastery in Selsey.

After the Roman conquest of AD 43, the Celtic society of Sussex became heavily Romanized.

The first written account of Christianity in Britain comes from the early Christian Berber author, Tertullian, writing in the third century, who said that "Christianity could even be found in Britain." Emperor Constantine (AD 306-337), granted official tolerance to Christianity with the Edict of Milan in AD 313. Then, in the reign of Emperor Theodosius "the Great" (AD 378–395), Christianity was made the official religion of the Roman Empire.

When Roman rule eventually ceased, Christianity was probably confined to urban communities.

==== Saxon ====
After the departure of the Roman army, the Saxons arrived in Sussex in the fifth century and brought with them their polytheistic religion. The Saxon pagan culture probably caused a reversal of the spread of Christianity. Then in AD 691 Saint Wilfrid, the exiled Bishop of York, landed at Selsey and is credited with evangelising the locals and founding the church in Sussex. According to Bede, it was the last area of the country to be converted.

==== Norman and Angevin ====
Following the Norman Conquest of 1066, there was a purge of the English episcopate in 1070. The Anglo-Saxon Bishop of Selsey was deposed and replaced with William the Conqueror's personal chaplain Stigand. During Stigand's episcopate the see that had been established at Selsey was transferred to Chichester after the Council of London of 1075 decreed that sees should be centred in cities rather than vills.

Bishop Ralph Luffa is credited with the foundation of the current Chichester Cathedral. The original structure that had been built by Stigand was largely destroyed by fire in 1114.

The archdeaconries of Chichester and Lewes were created in the 12th century under Ralph Luffa.

==== The Reformation ====
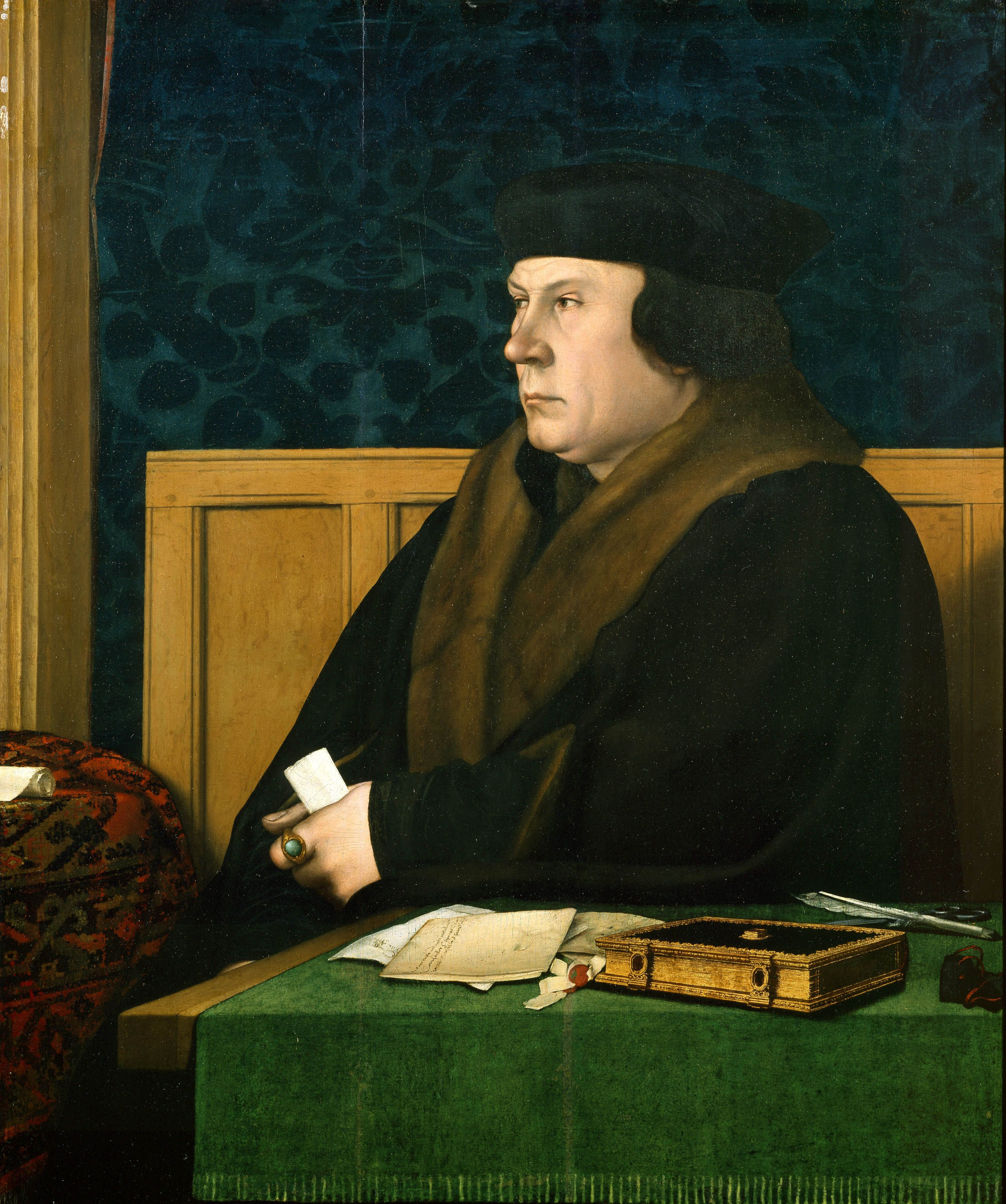
Sir Thomas Cromwell vicar-general.

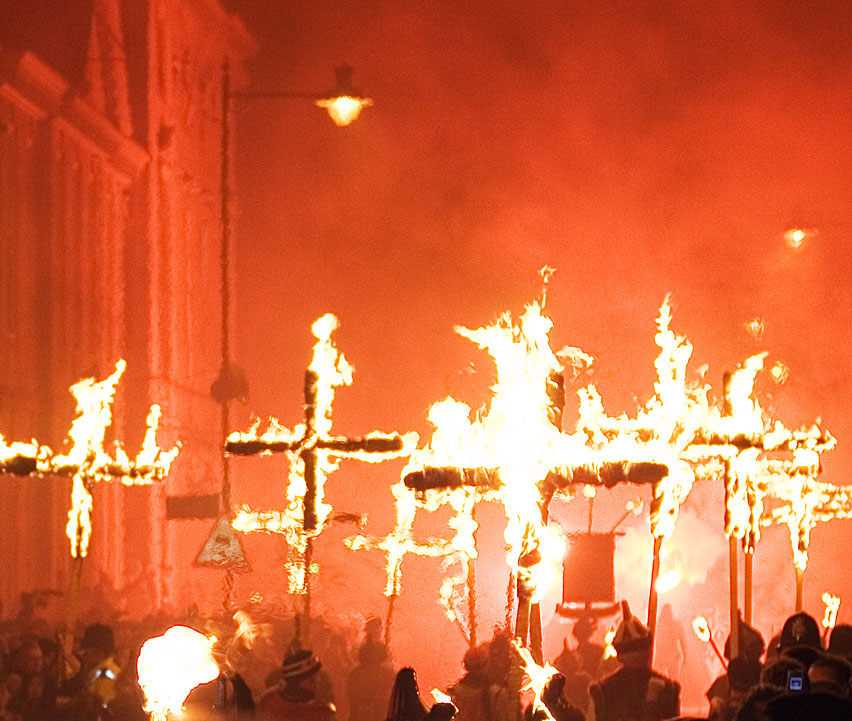
Martyrs crosses in Lewes.

Like the rest of the country the Church of England's split with Rome during the reign of Henry VIII, was felt in Sussex. In 1535, the king appointed Sir Thomas Cromwell as vicar-general. Cromwell visited Sussex later in 1535, as part of his national census of churches and monasteries. The census was carried out with the intention of taxing church property more effectively. Then during the following year of 1536, an act was passed that decreed the dissolution of monasteries with an income of less than £200 per annum. The first phase was followed by the voluntary surrenders of the larger houses. Lewes Priory with Battle, was the first house in England, during the Dissolution, to surrender on a voluntary basis. The monks surrendered the house in November 1537 in return for either being given a small pension or a living as a priest. Sussex did not do too badly compared to the rest of the country, as it only had one person in 500, who was a member of a religious order, compared to the national average of one in 256.

In 1538 there was a royal order for the demolition of the shrine of Saint Richard, in Chichester Cathedral. Thomas Cromwell saying that there was a certain kind of idolatry about the shrine.

Richard Sampson, the Bishop of Chichester incurred the displeasure of Cromwell and ended up imprisoned in the Tower of London at the end of 1539. Sampson was released, after the fall from favour and execution of Cromwell in 1540. Sampson then continued at the see of Chichester for a further two years. Sampson was succeeded as Bishop of Chichester by George Day. Day opposed the changes, and incurred the displeasure of the royal commissioners who promptly suspended him as Bishop and allowed him only preach in his cathedral church.

Henry VIII died in 1547, his son Edward VI continued on the path that his father had set. However his reign was only short-lived as he died after only six years.

The bishops of Chichester had not been for the Reformation until the appointment of John Scory, to the episcopate, who replaced Day in 1552. During Henry VIII's reign two of the canons of Chichester cathedral had been executed for their opposition to the Reformation and, during the reign of his son, Edward VI, George Day ultimately had been imprisoned for his opposition to the reforms.

There had been twenty years of religious reform, when the Catholic Mary I succeeded to the throne of England in 1553. Mary expected her clergy to be unmarried, so Bishop Scory thought it prudent to retire as he was a married man, and George Day was released and restored to the see of Chichester.

Mary's persecution of Protestants earned her the nickname Bloody Mary. The national figure for those Protestants burnt at the stake, during her reign, was around 288 and included 41 in Sussex. Most of the executions in Sussex were at Lewes. Of the total of 41 burnings, 36 can be identified to have come from specific parishes and the place of execution is known for 27 of them; this is because the details of the executions were recorded in the Book of Martyrs by John Foxe, published in 1563. There are Bonfire Societies in Sussex that still remember the 17 Protestant martyrs that burned in Lewes High Street, and in Lewes itself they have a procession of martyrs crosses during the bonfire night celebration.

When Mary died, in 1558, she was replaced by her Protestant half-sister Elizabeth I.

Elizabeth re-established the break with Rome when she passed the 1559 Acts of Supremacy and Uniformity, the clergy were expected to take statutory oaths and those that did not were deprived of their living. In the county nearly half the cathedral and about 40% of the parish clergy had to be replaced, although some of the vacancies were due to ill health or death.

==== Civil War ====
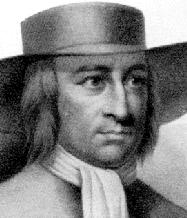
19th-century engraving of George Fox.

There were no battles of national significance, in Sussex, during the 1642–1651 English civil war, however there were small sieges at Chichester and Arundel. The west of the county was generally for the king although Chichester was for parliament and the east of the county, with some exceptions, was also for parliament. A few churches were damaged particularly in the Arundel area. Also, after the surrender of Chichester, the Cathedral was sacked by Sir William Waller's parliamentary troops. Bruno Ryves, Dean of Chichester Cathedral said of the troops that they deface and mangle (the monuments) with their swords as high as they could reach. He also complained that Waller's troops..

"..brake down the Organs and dashing the pipes with their Pole-axes.."
Mercurius Rusticus p. 139

Destruction of the cathedrals' music seems to have been one of the objectives as Ryves also said, of Waller's men, that..

"they force open all the locks, either of doors or desks wherein the Singing-men laid up their Common-Prayer Books, their singing-Books, their Gowns and Surplesses they rent the Books in pieces and scatter the torn leaves all over the Church, even to the covering of the Pavement.."
Mercurius Rusticus p. 140

About a quarter of the incumbents were forced from their parishes and replaced with Puritans. Many people turned away from the traditional churches and in 1655 George Fox founded the Society of Friends at Horsham.

==== The Restoration ====
The Restoration of the English monarchy began in 1660 under Charles II.

It took over a year, after the restoration of Charles II in May 1660, for Chichester cathedral to get its choir back to full strength.

William Penn lived in the county for a while, in 1676 he bought the estate of Warminghurst, near Steyning. Then in 1681 Charles II granted him lands in what became Pennsylvania and Delaware. Amongst those who he carried to Pennsylvania, as colonists, were two hundred people from Sussex. Penn sold the estate, at Warminghurst, to a James Butler in 1707.

==== 19th Century ====
In 1851 the authorities organised a census of places of worship in England and Wales. The figures for Sussex indicated that there were more Anglican than non-conformist places of worship. In the neighbouring counties of Hampshire and Kent, there were more non-conformist places than Anglican.

Sussex Places of Worship 1851; Table based on figures in Census of Great Britain 1851. Religious Worship..
| Denomination | Places of Worship |
| Church of England | 350 |
| Independents | 78 |
| Baptists | 40 |
| Society of Friends | 5 |
| Unitarians | 5 |
| Methodists | 75 |
| Isolated Congregations^{*} | 32 |
| Roman Catholics | 8 |
| Catholic and Apostolic | 1 |
| Latter Day Saints | 2 |
| Jewish | 1 |
* Isolated Congregations do not belong to any particular sect and are independent of each other.

==== 21st Century ====
Lists of all current and former places of worship in Sussex by district are as follows:

- Adur District
- Arun District
- Brighton and Hove
- Chichester (current)
- Chichester (former)
- Crawley
- Eastbourne
- Hastings
- Horsham District
- Lewes District
- Mid Sussex
- Rother
- Wealden (current)
- Wealden (former)
- Worthing

=== Anglican ===
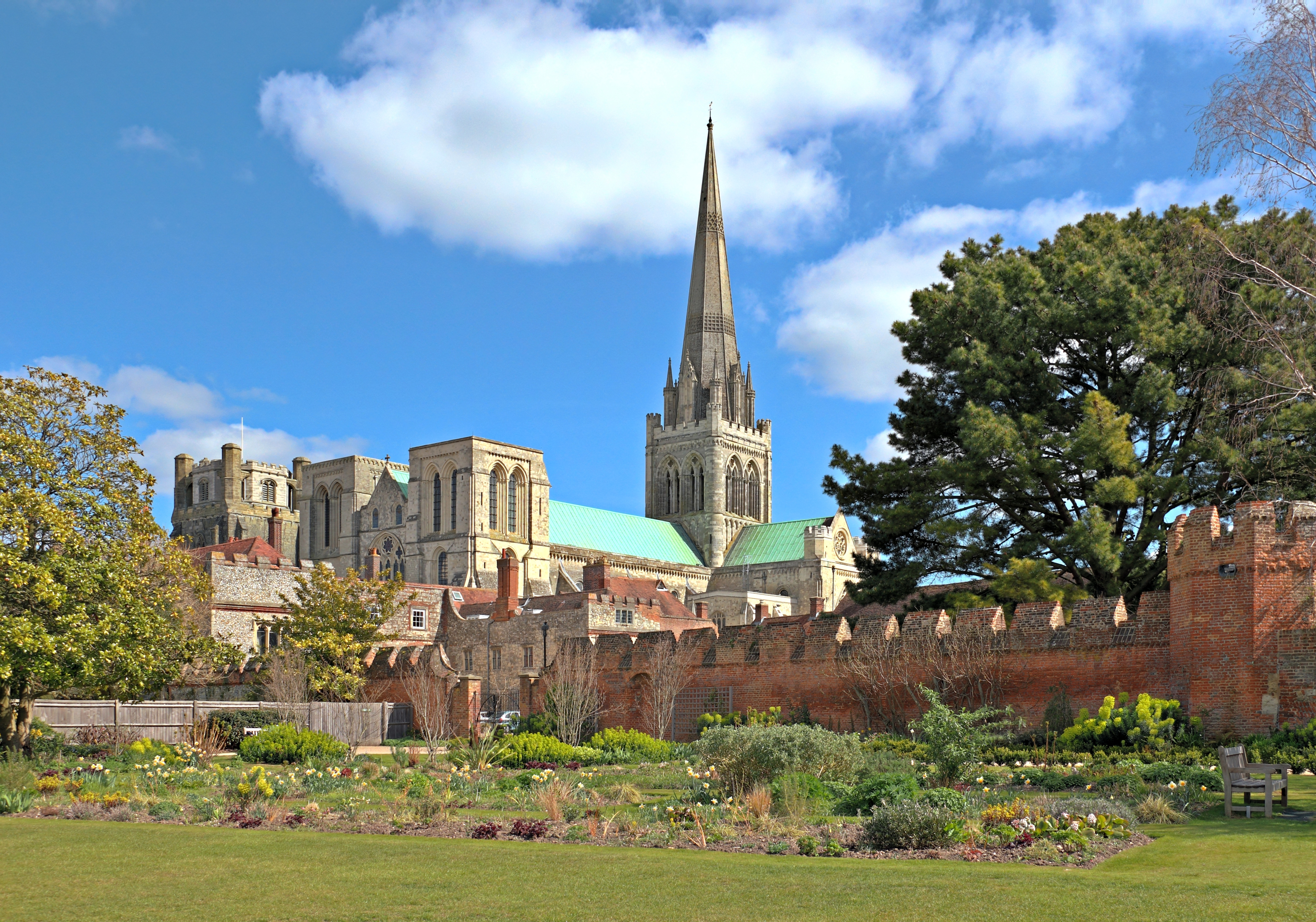
Chichester Cathedral

The officially established religion in England is the Church of England. In Sussex the church was founded in the 7th century: King Aethelwealh was Sussex's first Christian king and Wilfrid of York is credited with evangelising the people of Sussex. The church accepted the authority of the Pope until King Henry VIII broke with Rome in the 1530s to secure an annulment from his wife. The seat of the Sussex bishopric was originally located at Selsey Abbey being transferred by the Normans to Chichester Cathedral in 1075. The Diocese of Chichester covers modern Sussex and is sub-divided into the archdeaconries of Chichester, Horsham, Brighton & Lewes and Hastings. The Bishop of Chichester has overall episcopal oversight across the diocese and is one of the church's 42 bishops eligible to be one of the 26 Lords Spiritual, representing the Church of England in the House of Lords.

There is one Free Church of England congregation in Shoreham-by-Sea.

=== Roman Catholic ===
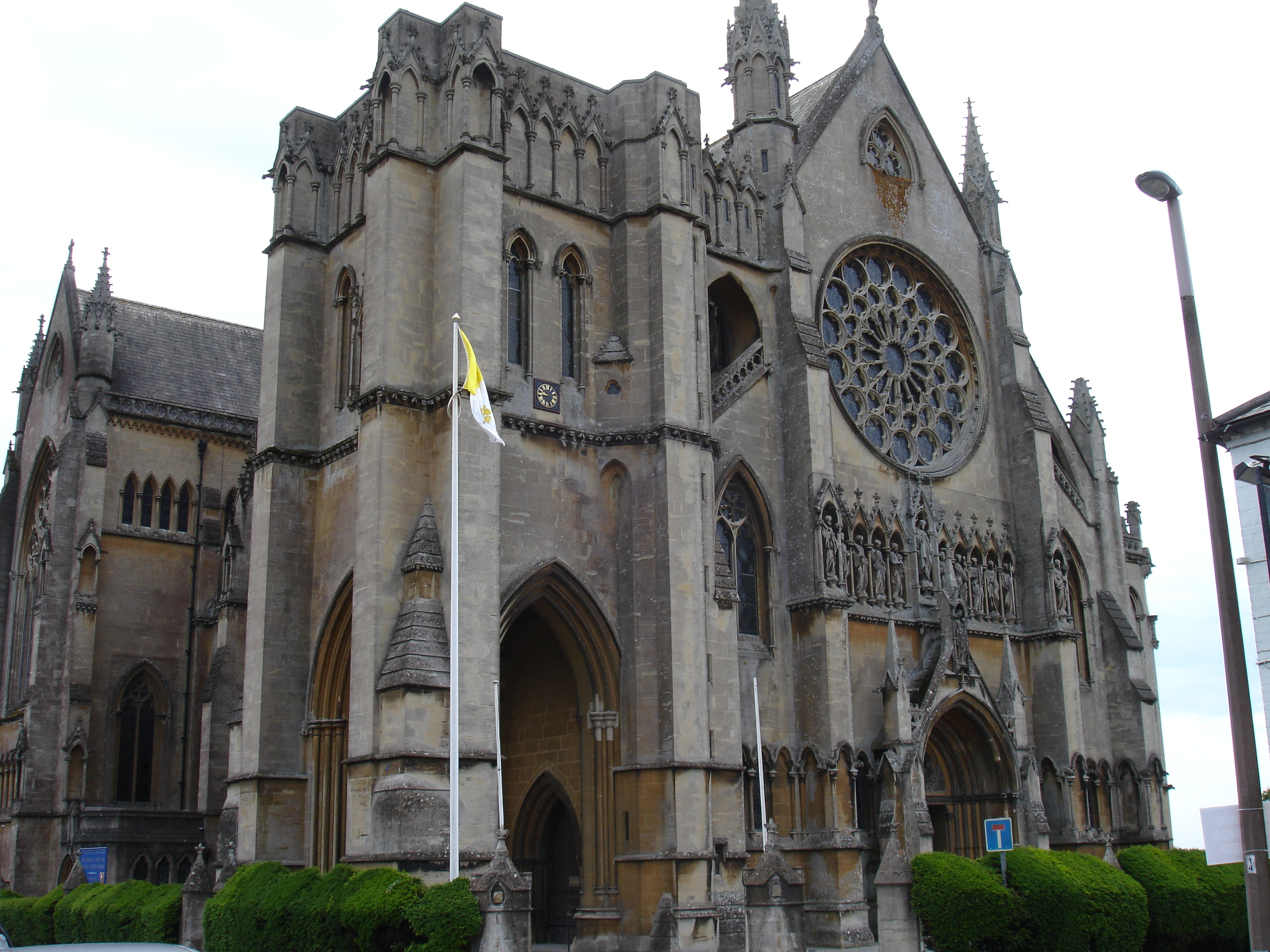
The Roman Catholic cathedral at Arundel.

The English Church continuously adhered to See of Rome until in 1534, during the reign of King Henry VIII, the church, through a series of legislative acts between 1533 and 1536 became independent from the Pope for a period as the Church of England. In the reign of Queen Mary, Catholicism was enforced by the Marian persecutions and when Queen Elizabeth I came to the throne in 1558, the Church of England's independence from Rome was reasserted and being a Jesuit or seminarian became a treasonable offence in 1571. The Roman Catholic faith survived in Sussex with islands of Catholic recusancy, especially in the west of the county.

Since 1965 Arundel Cathedral has been the seat of the Roman Catholic Bishops of Arundel and Brighton, which covers Sussex and Surrey.

The UK's only Carthusian monastery is situated at St. Hugh's Charterhouse, Parkminster near Cowfold.

=== Others ===
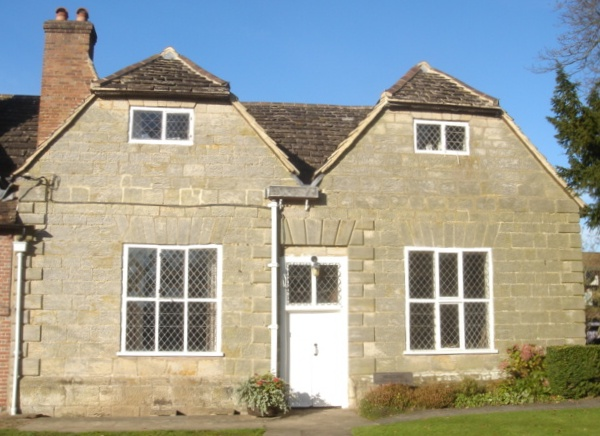
The Friends' Meeting House in the Ifield area of Crawley is one of the oldest Quaker places of worship in the world

Protestant non-conformity was historically strong in the Weald and in the east of county, as well as some of the towns in the west. Non-conformity emerged in the Sussex Weald in the 14th century where some of the supporters of the Peasants Revolt of 1381 were Lollard followers of John Wycliffe or followers of John Ball. Over the centuries the Weald gained a reputation for being beyond state and church control, providing a haven for Lollard and early Protestant congregations. The towns of Rye and Winchelsea in the east of the county also received a significant influx of French Protestant Huguenots in the 16th century who reinforced the Protestant nature of the towns.

United Reformed Church is a union of Presbyterian and Congregational churches. Churches within Sussex are in the Southern synod. Churches within the Methodist church are within the church's South East district. Methodist pioneers came to the Rape of Hastings in 1756, with John Wesley visiting Rye in 1758. Wesley's last open air sermon was held in nearby Winchelsea in 1790. The Horsham area still has a strong Quaker presence. William Penn lived in the area and worshipped in a nearby Quaker Meeting House. Quakers have likewise worshipped in Lewes continuously since 1655; their current meeting house dates from 1784. Sussex has several Baptist churches. In the mid-19th century most of England and Scotland's 24 Baptist churches were in Sussex and Kent. (Note: There were 5 further churches in Wales)

Sussex remains a stronghold of the Countess of Huntingdon's Connexion, a group of churches where Sussex has 7 of the 21 congregations in England, all located in the east and centre of the county. Its first church was set up in 1761 in North Street, Brighton in what was originally Selina, Countess of Huntingdon's garden.

There is also a Hutterian community near Robertsbridge.

Following the Second Sudanese Civil War, many refugees came to Brighton and Hove and Hove is now home to a Coptic Orthodox Church, one of 27 such churches in the British Isles.

== Other Abrahamic religions ==
=== Islam ===
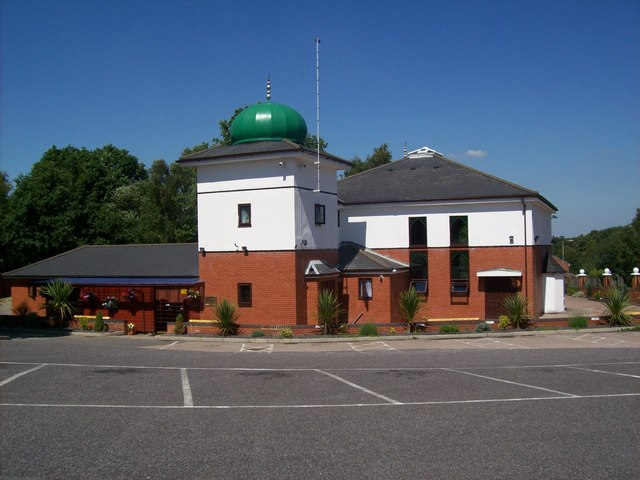
Broadfield Mosque in Crawley

In the 2011 census, 1.4% of the population of Sussex or almost 23,000 people identified themselves as Muslim, making Islam Sussex's second largest religion. This proportion is significantly lower than the English average of 5%. Within Sussex, Crawley had the highest proportion of Muslims with 7.2% of the population.

There are mosques in Crawley, Brighton, Worthing, Horsham, Haywards Heath and St Leonards-on-Sea.

=== Judaism ===
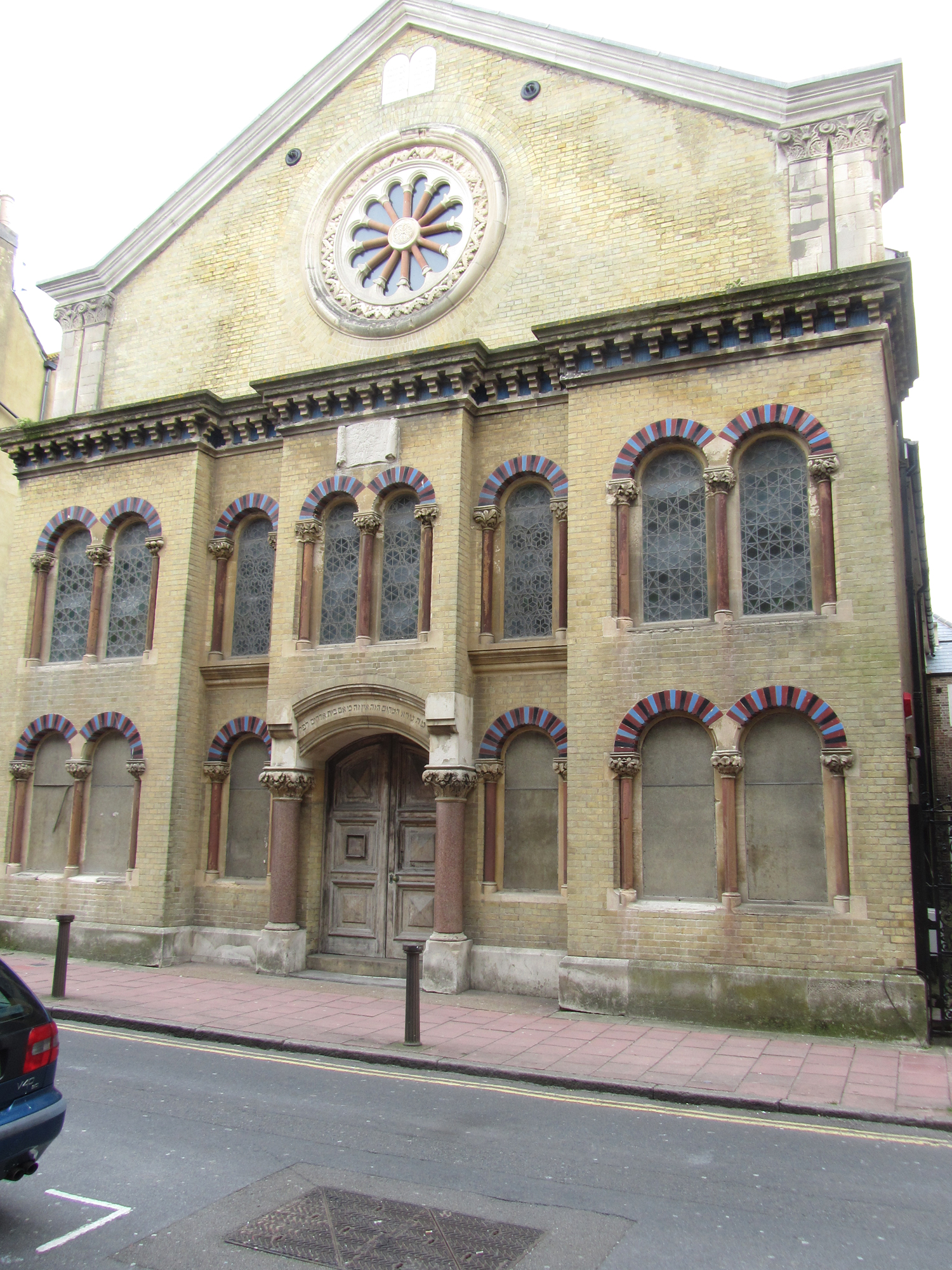
The Middle Street Synagogue in Brighton

Across Sussex about 0.3% of the population identified as Jewish in 2011, lower than across England as a whole where the average was 0.5%. 52% of Sussex's Jewish population live in Brighton and Hove (more than 2,500 or about 1% of the city's population).

There are four synagogues in Brighton and Hove, including two Ashkenazi synagogues, one Reform and one Progressive. There is also a Progressive congregation in Eastbourne.

Jewish people have been recorded as living in Sussex since the 12th century and are first mentioned in 1179/80 pipe roll for Chichester. A considerable Jewish community existed in Chichester by 1186. Jews are also recorded in Arundel, Hailsham, and Lewes, and were expelled from Winchelsea in 1273. All Sussex's Jews would have been expelled in 1290 when King Edward I issued the Edict of Expulsion. A Jewish population had returned to Sussex by the late 18th century in Brighton and Arundel and later there were also Jewish people in Findon, Seaford and Lewes.

== Indian religions ==
=== Hinduism ===
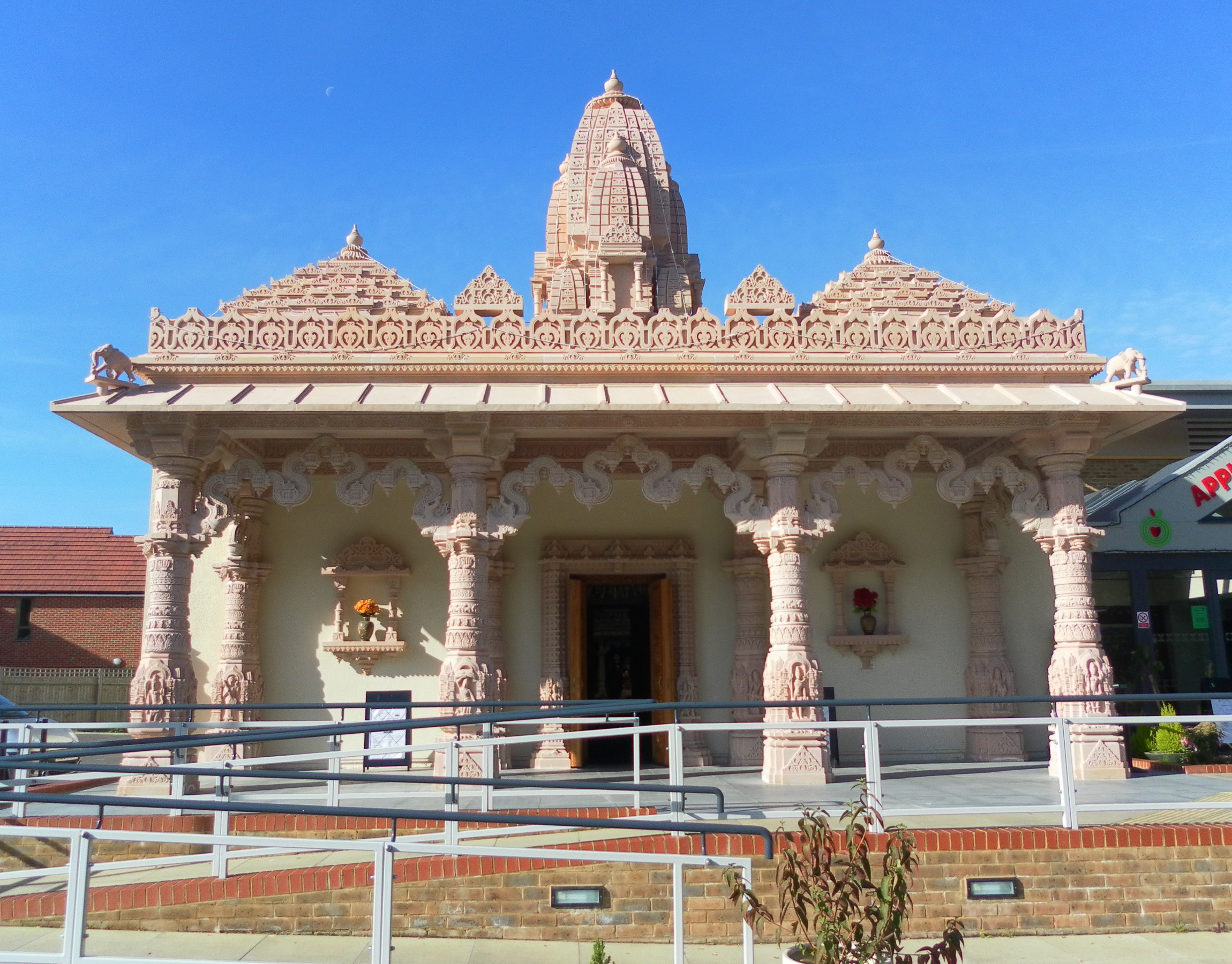
The Gurjar Hindu temple in the Ifield area of Crawley.

According to the 2011 census, 0.7% of Sussex's population identify their religion as Hinduism, lower than the average for England of 1.5%. Within Sussex the proportion of Hindus was highest in Crawley, where the 4.6% of the population said they were Hindu, significantly higher than the English average. Crawley is home to two Hindu temples and a Hindu centre including a Swaminarayan mandir while there is also a Swaminarayan Mandir in Brighton and Hove).

=== Sikhism ===
According to the 2011 census, 0.1% of Sussex's population identify their religion as Sikhism, lower than the average for England of 0.8%. Within Sussex the proportion of Sikhs was highest in Crawley, where the 0.7% of the population said they were Sikh, a figure similar to average for England. During World War One the bodies of 53 Hindus and Sikhs were taken to a remote location on the South Downs where a ghat or funeral pyre was built so that they could be cremated and their ashes scattered in the English Channel in line with religious custom. Since 2000 the local Sikh community has led an annual ceremony to the memorial at this location, called the Chattri.

=== Buddhism ===
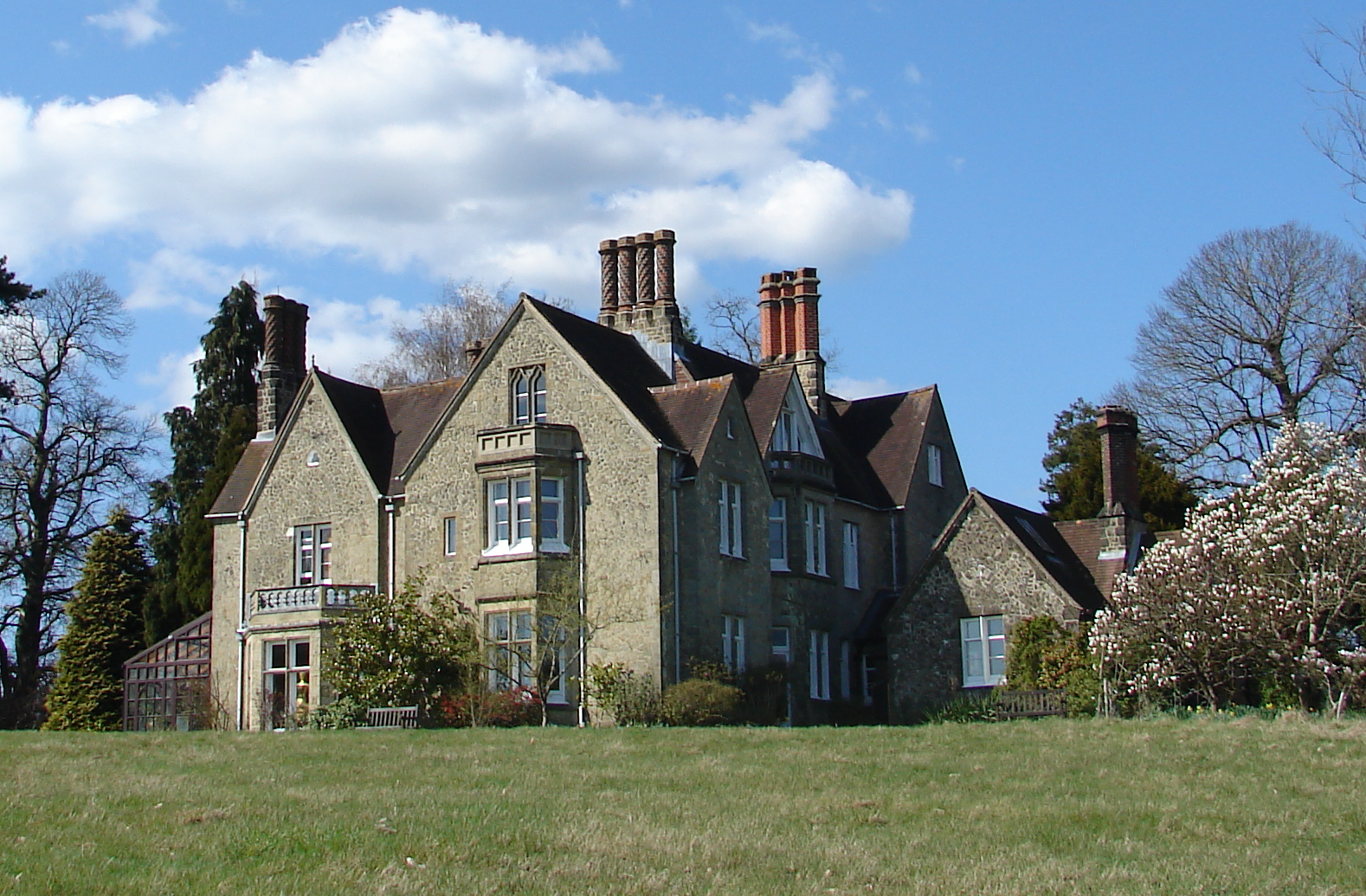
A Buddhist monastery was established in Chithurst in 1979.

In 2011, 0.5% of Sussex's residents identified as Buddhist, which is the same as the average for England. Brighton and Hove had the highest proportion of Buddhists in Sussex with 1% of the population. The Chithurst Buddhist Monastery is a Theravada monastery in the Thai Forest Tradition and was established to the west of Midhurst in 1979. Brighton is also home to the Brighton Buddhist Centre.

== Other religions ==
=== Scientology ===
The UK headquarters of the Church of Scientology is situated at Saint Hill Manor, formerly the home of the group's founder, L. Ron Hubbard. In 2011 Mid Sussex had the highest proportion of Scientologists per head of any district in England and Wales.

=== Jediism ===
1 per cent of respondents in Brighton and Hove in the 2011 census gave their religion as jediism, the highest in the UK.

== Historic faiths ==
=== Prehistoric religions ===
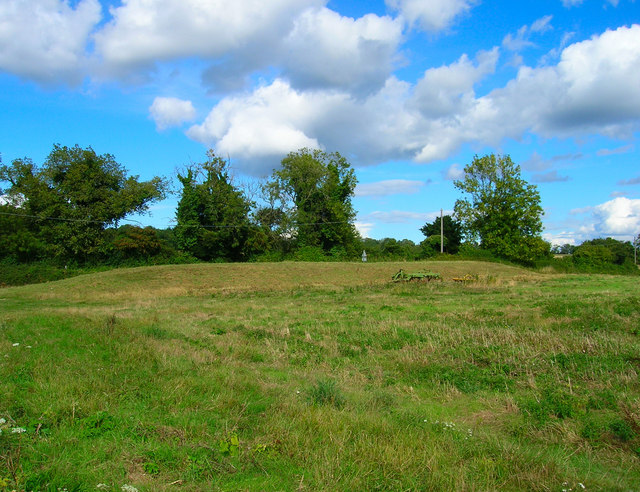
A long barrow known as Bevis's Thumb near Compton, West Sussex.

The tendency of humans to dispose of their dead ceremonially is considered to distinguish them from other species of animals. This started to happen in Europe about 80,000 years ago. The human record in Sussex goes back to the Palaeolithic age. No human bones have been found in Sussex from that period, although the discovery of large flint implements indicate that there was human occupation .

There have been finds across Europe that suggest that people believed in some sort of afterlife, but whether this represented a religion is not certain. The number of Palaeolithic graves found across Europe has been small and all those in the British region show signs of having been buried in a ritual way.

The Neolithic people of Sussex built causewayed enclosures, including those at Whitehawk Camp, Combe Hill and The Trundle. There is an hypothesis that there was a ritual element in the construction of these sites, possibly to consecrate the enclosure. Important burials were in long mounds, known as barrows and several have been found in Sussex, they contained cremated remains in pottery vessels. One of the better known long barrows in Sussex is that of Solomon's or Baverse's (Bevis's) Thumb near Compton, it measures 150 feet (46 m) in length by 20 feet (6.1 m) wide.

The general way of life in the Bronze Age in Sussex was not too different from that of the Neolithic and this way of life continued for about one thousand years, until the arrival of the Celts from the south east.

Formal cemeteries and ritual centres have been found at Westhampnett and Lancing Down dating from the late Iron Age.

=== Gallo-Roman religion ===
From about 600BC Celts started settling in Britain. In 75BC the Belgae arrived in Sussex, bringing with them the Gods and Cult symbols they revered in Gaul. There is not much known about the ancient Celtic religion and a lot of what we do know is based on the writings of ancient Greek and Roman scholars and archaeology. The Celtic religion was polytheistic, and consisted of both gods and goddesses, some of which were venerated only in a small, local area, but others whose worship had a wider geographical distribution. Julius Caesar observed that some of the Celtic gods were similar to that of the Roman gods.

=== Germanic paganism ===
After the departure of the Roman army, the Saxons arrived in Sussex in the fifth century and brought with them their polytheistic religion. The Saxon pagan culture probably caused a reversal of the spread of Christianity.

== Notable places of worship ==
The varied religious and ethnic history of England has left a wide range of religious buildings—churches, cathedrals, chapels, chapels of ease, synagogues, mosques and temples. Besides its spiritual importance, the religious architecture includes buildings of importance to the tourism industry and local pride. As a result of the Reformation, the ancient cathedrals remained in the possession of the then-established churches, while most Roman Catholic churches date from Victorian times or are of more recent construction. Notable places of worship include:

- Arundel Cathedral – Roman Catholic
- Chichester Cathedral – Church of England
- Chithurst Buddhist Monastery - Buddhist
- Horsham Unitarian Church - Unitarian
- Ifield Friends Meeting House - Quaker
- Lullington Church - Church of England
- Madina Mosque, Horsham - Islamic
- Middle Street Synagogue, Brighton - Jewish
- Saint Hill Manor, Church of Scientology
- Shri Swaminarayan Mandir, Brighton - Hindu
- St Andrew's Church, Alfriston - Church of England
- St John the Baptist's Church, Brighton - Roman Catholic
- St Mary and St Abraam Coptic Orthodox Church, Hove - Coptic Orthodox
- St Peter's Church, Selsey - Church of England
- Worth Abbey - Roman Catholic

== Irreligion ==
30.5% of people in Sussex declared no religion in 2011. These figures are higher than the figures for England or the United Kingdom. Brighton and Hove had the highest such proportion in Sussex at 42.4% and was the second highest in the UK after Norwich with 42.5%.

== Bibliography ==
- Armstrong, J.R. (1971). A History of Sussex. Sussex: Phillimore. ISBN 0-85033-185-4.
- Brandon, Peter (2006). Sussex. London: Phillimore. ISBN 978-0-7090-6998-0.
- Dimmock, Matthew; Quinn, Paul; Hadfield, Andrew (2014). Art, Literature and Religion in Early Modern Sussex. Ashgate Publishing. ISBN 978-1-4724-0522-7.
- Hillaby, Joe; Hillaby, Caroline (2013). The Palgrave Dictionary of Medieval Anglo-Jewish History. Palgrave Macmillan. ISBN 978-0-275-99479-2.
- Jones, Michael E. (1998). The End of Roman Britain. Cornell University Press. ISBN 978-0-8014-8530-5.
- Pope, Matthew (2007–2008). ""Early Upper Palaeolithic archaeology at Beedings, West Sussex: new contexts for Pleistocene archaeology" in Archaeology International Issue 11". UCL.
- Sell, Alan P.F. (2012). Testimony and Tradition: Studies in Reformed and Dissenting Thought. Wipf and Stock Publishers. ISBN 978-1-62032-424-0.
- Stell, Christopher (2002). Nonconformist Chapels and Meeting-houses in Eastern England. Swindon: English Heritage. ISBN 1-873592-50-7.

== See also ==
- Culture of Sussex
- Religion in England
- Religion in the United Kingdom

== Footnotes ==
Notes
