= Saddlescombe Preceptory =

Former monastic house in West Sussex, England

Coordinates: 50°53′20″N 0°11′34″W

Saddlescombe Preceptory was a priory in West Sussex, England. The house was run by the order of the Knights Templar, and was founded c. 1228.
