= Calcetto Priory =

Priory in West Sussex, England

Calcetto Priory was a priory in West Sussex, England. "Calcetto", meaning "Causeway", was an alternative name for the house of Augustinian canons at Pynham.
