= Arundel Blackfriars =

Monastery in West Sussex, England

Coordinates: 50.8540°N 0.5525°W

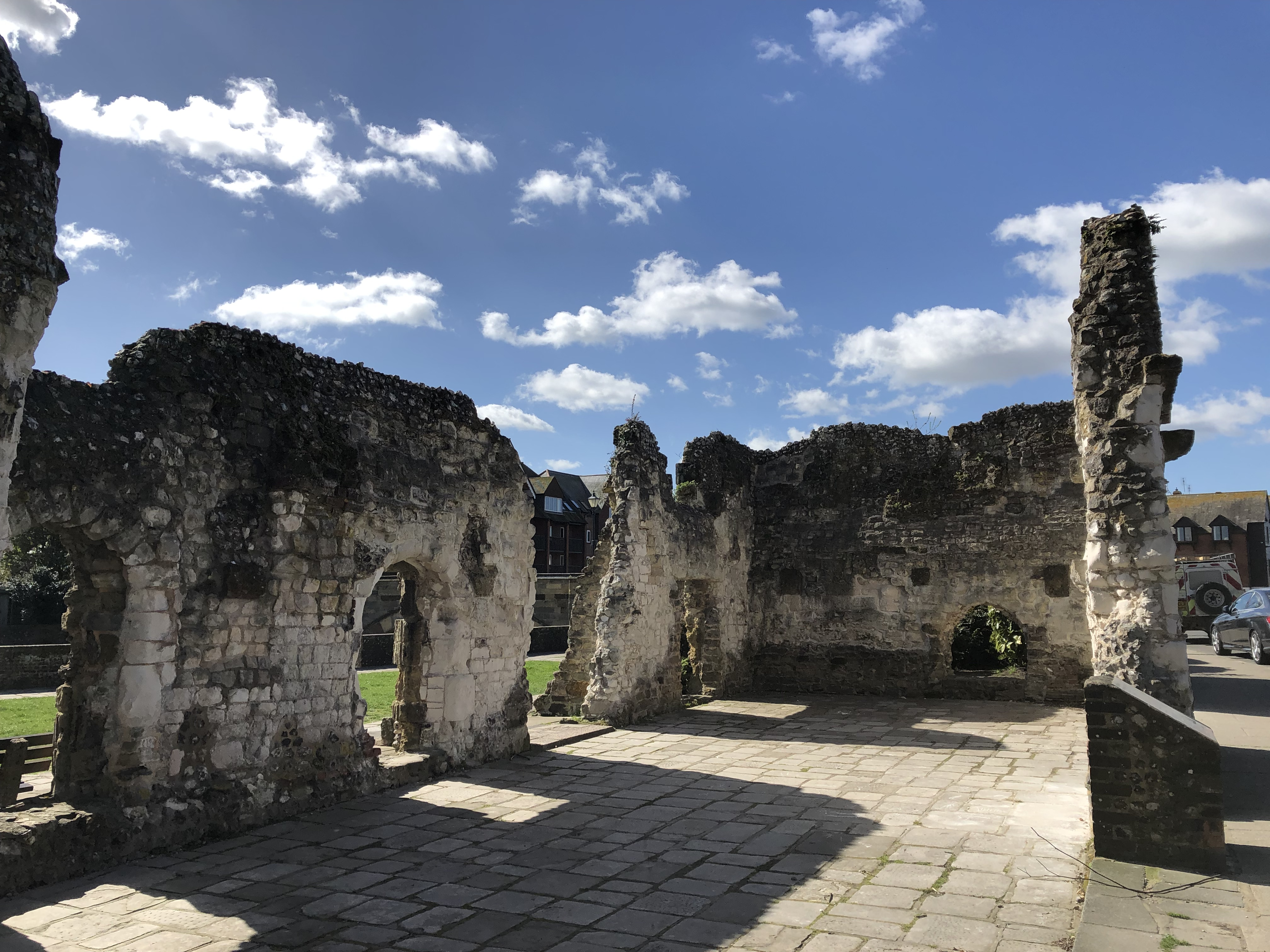
The ruined south range of the friary.

Arundel Blackfriars, otherwise Dominican Priory, Arundel, was a friary of the Dominican Order in Arundel, West Sussex, England. The date of foundation was before 1253, when Saint Richard, bishop of Chichester, mentioned it in his will. The friary remained small and poor throughout its history. It was dissolved in 1538, when it had five friars.

There are structural remains of the friary's south range in Mill Lane, which were previously misidentified as the Maison Dieu. This had a cloister to its north and a dormitory to its west. Across the road to the north, a featureless building may have been the church. The buildings were used as a malthouse after the Dissolution, but were largely destroyed in the nineteenth century.
