= Crawley Down Monastery =

Anglican monastery in West Sussex, England

Coordinates: 51.134358°N 0.077266°W

The Monastery of the Holy Trinity, Crawley Down is an Anglican monastery located at Crawley Down in West Sussex, England.

The monastery belongs to the order of the Community of the Servants of the Will of God (CSWG), an Anglican order based on the Benedictine rule. The monastery includes both men and women living under the same monastic rule. It is a semi-eremitical community.

From 1973 to 2009, the Father Superior (head of the monastery) was Father Gregory CSWG. Father Gregory died on August 12, 2009. Fr Gregory stood down as superior in 2008 due to ill health. The community elected Father Colin, as the community's superior; he has remained Superior since that time

The monastery community celebrate a sung Divine Office / Liturgy of the Hours each day, using a modal chant within an Orthodox style of liturgy. The community recites the Jesus Prayer several evenings a week, reflecting their links with the Patriarchal Stavropegic Monastery of St. John the Baptist at Tolleshunt Knights in Essex, England.

== External ==
Website: https://servants-of-the-will-of-god-cswg-monastery-of-the.business.site/
