= Lyminster Priory =

Former priory in England

Coordinates: 50°50′0″N 0°32′56″W

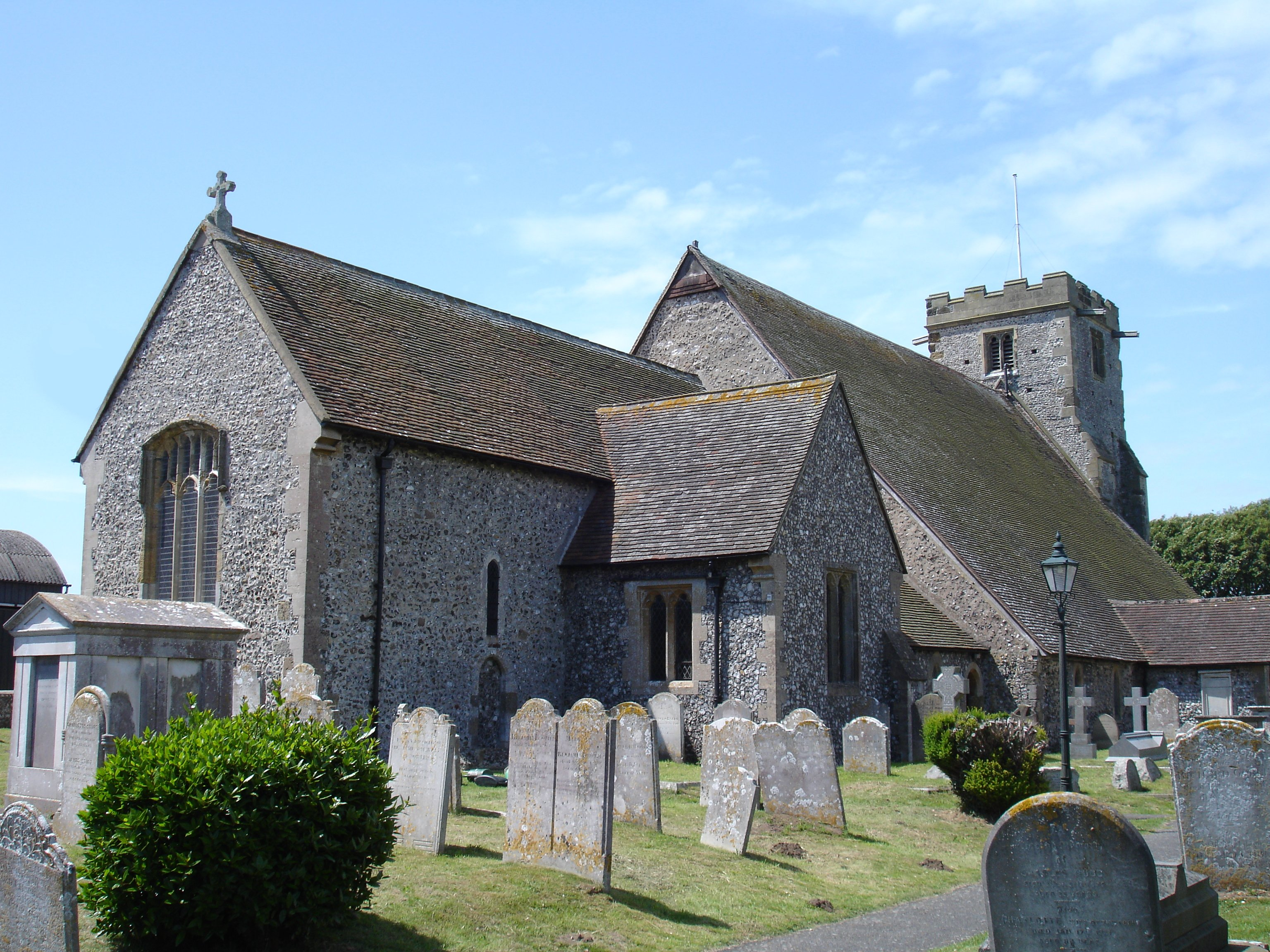
Lyminster priory

Lyminster Priory was a priory in Lyminster, West Sussex, England. It was a possible Saxon royal minster of Benedictine nuns and was founded or refounded about 1082AD by Roger de Montgomery, Earl of Sussex, who granted land to St. Peter's Abbey, Almenesches. The Priory was dissolved in about 1414AD and is now the Parish Church of St Mary Magdalene.

According to the Hagiography of the Medieval Secgan Manuscript, Saint Cuthflæd of Lyminster is buried in or nearby the priory.
