= Frances Mackenzie, Countess of Seaforth =

Welsh-born Scottish noblewoman

The Right Honourable The Dowager Countess of Seaforth
- Born: Lady Frances Herbert; 1659; Montgomeryshire, Wales
- Died: 18 December 1732 (aged 72–73); Paris, France
- Spouse: Kenneth Mackenzie, 4th Earl of Seaforth
- Issue: William Mackenzie, 5th Earl of Seaforth; Lady Mary Sempill
- Parents: William Herbert, 1st Marquess of Powis; Lady Elizabeth Somerset

Frances Mackenzie, Dowager Countess of Seaforth (née Herbert; 1659 – 18 December 1732), was a Welsh-born Scottish noblewoman and wife of Kenneth Mackenzie, 4th Earl of Seaforth.

== Biography ==
=== Early life and family ===
The daughter of William Herbert, 1st Marquess of Powis, and his wife, Lady Elizabeth Somerset, Frances was born into a Roman Catholic Jacobite family. She had one brother, William, and four sisters: Mary, Anne, Lucy and Winifred. Her family played an active part in the various Jacobite risings throughout the late 17th and early 18th centuries; her father personally helped Mary of Modena and James, Prince of Wales escape after the Glorious Revolution of 1688; and her sister Winifred's husband William Maxwell, 5th Earl of Nithsdale was captured at Preston together with other Jacobite leaders, found guilty of treason and sentenced to death. Winifred famously helped him escape from the Tower of London in 1715.

=== Marriage and children ===
Frances married a fellow Jacobite in 1680, the Scottish Kenneth Mackenzie, 4th Earl of Seaforth. The Mackenzies had four children: William, Mary, Alicia and Alexander. Ten years into their marriage, Kenneth was sent off to head a rising in Scotland. He was captured and imprisoned, however. He was released in 1697 and the family fled to Paris, where he died in January 1701.

=== Later years and death ===
After her husband's death, she remained in Paris, and died there on 18 December 1732, aged 73.

== Children ==
Name	Birth	Death	Notes
William Mackenzie, 5th Earl of Seaforth	Unknown	8 January 1740	married Mary Kennet; had issue
Lady Mary Sempill	Unknown	1740	married firstly in 1712, John Caryll; had issue married secondly in 1725, Francis Sempill; had issue

== Ancestry ==
Ancestors of Frances Mackenzie, Countess of Seaforth

8. William Herbert, 1st Baron Powis
4. Percy Herbert, 2nd Baron Powis
9. Eleanor Percy
2. William Herbert, 1st Marquess of Powis
10. Sir William Craven
5. Elizabeth Craven
11. Elizabeth Whitmore
1. Frances Mackenzie, Countess of Seaforth
12. Henry Somerset, 1st Marquess of Worcester
6. Edward Somerset, 2nd Marquess of Worcester
13. Anne Russell
3. Lady Elizabeth Somerset
14. Sir William Dormer
7. Elizabeth Dormer
15. Anne Molyneux
