= William Mackenzie, 5th Earl of Seaforth =

Scottish nobleman (d. 1740)

- Earl of Seaforth
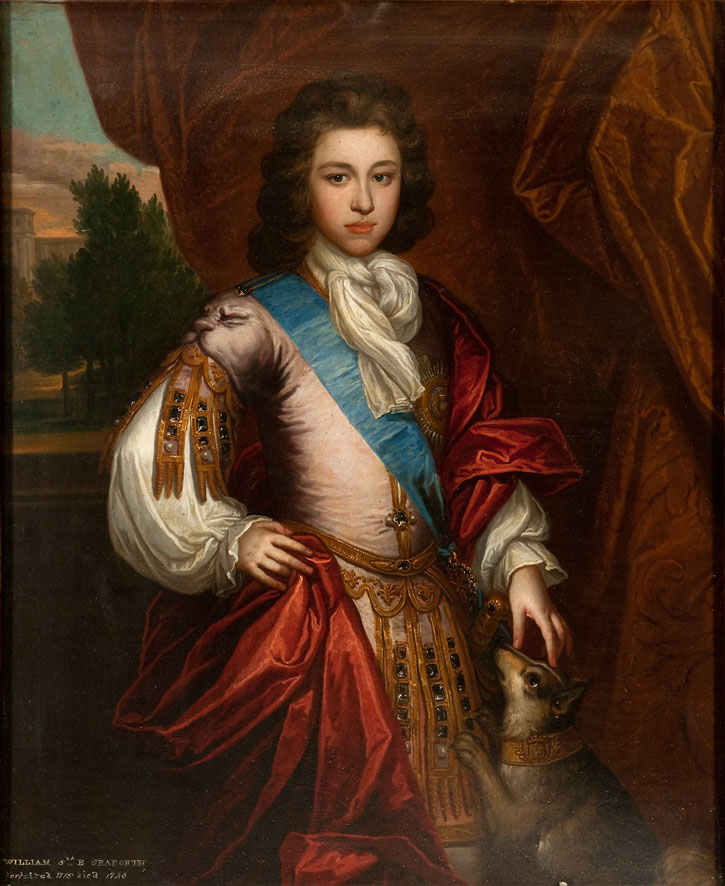
- Seaforth as a boy
- Tenure: 1701–1716 (Attainted)
- Predecessor: Kenneth Mackenzie, 4th Earl of Seaforth
- Successor: Kenneth Mackenzie, Lord Fortrose
- Born: Unknown
- Died: 8 January 1740; Isle of Lewis
- Spouse: Mary Kennet (m. 1715)
- Issue: Kenneth Mackenzie, Lord Fortrose; The Hon. Ronald Mackenzie; The Hon. Nicholas Mackenzie; Lady Frances Mackenzie
- Parents: Kenneth Mackenzie, 4th Earl of Seaforth; Lady Frances Herbert

William Mackenzie, 5th Earl of Seaforth (died 1740), and 2nd titular Marquess of Seaforth (in the Jacobite Peerage), also known as Uilleam Dubh, or Black William, was a Scottish peer and head of Clan Mackenzie. Educated in France and brought up as a Roman Catholic, he was attainted for his part in the 1715 Jacobite Rising and also joined the 1719 Rising.

He was pardoned in 1726 and allowed to return home, although the title Earl of Seaforth remained forfeit. He died on 8 January 1740 on the Isle of Lewis and was buried in the ancient church of Ui.

== Life ==
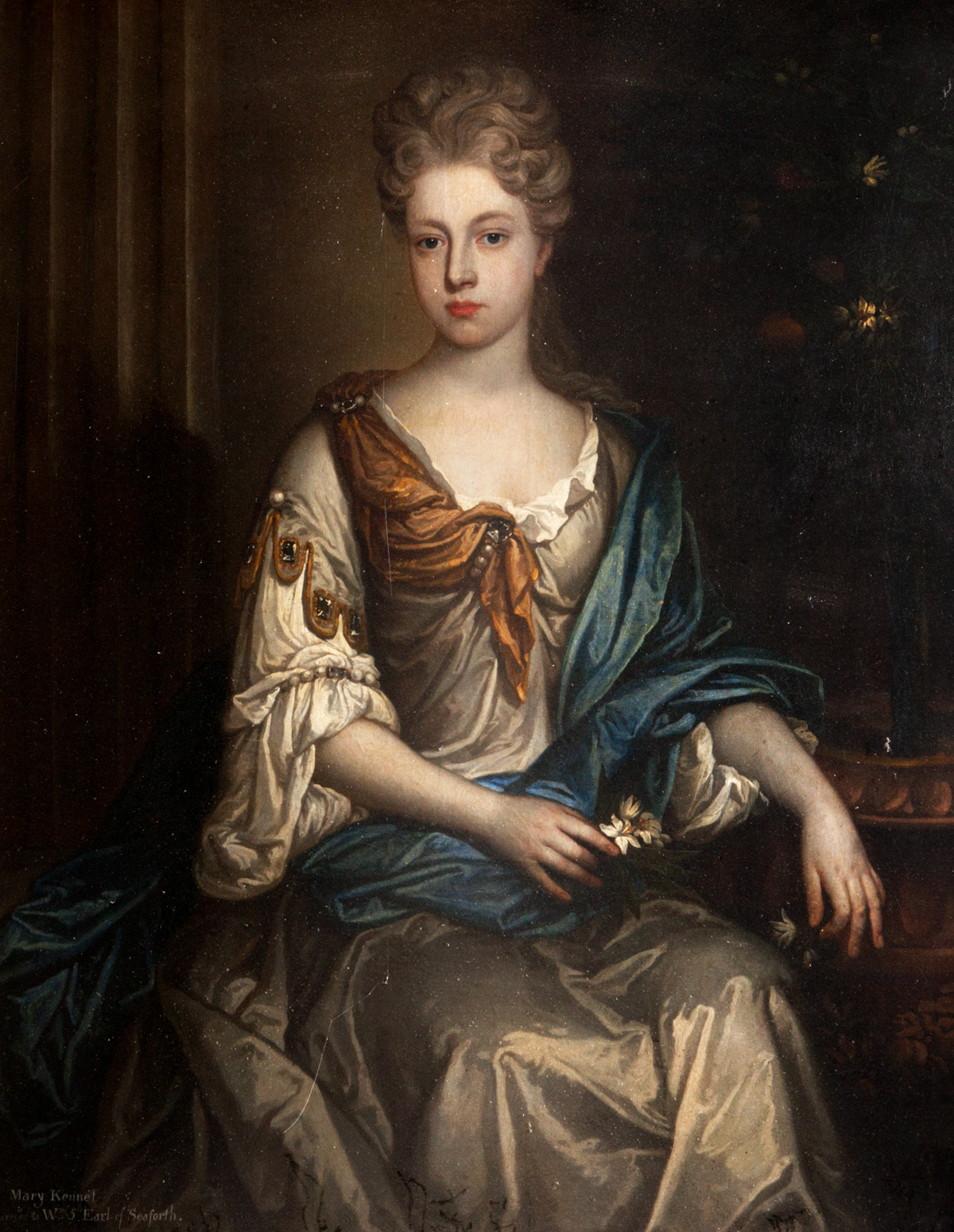
William Mackenzie's wife, Mary Kennet

William Mackenzie was the eldest son of Kenneth Mackenzie, 4th Earl of Seaforth, who converted to Catholicism, allegedly in return for financial assistance from James II. His mother Frances was the second daughter of William Herbert, Marquess of Powis, one of the five Catholic lords falsely accused of conspiring to assassinate Charles II in the Popish Plot.

William's date and place of birth are uncertain. His father went into exile following the 1688 Glorious Revolution and took part in the 1690 Jacobite campaign in Scotland but surrendered to the new government in 1691; he spent most of the next ten years in and out of prison and died in 1701, leaving huge financial debts; his widow sent William and a daughter to France to be educated and brought up as Catholics.

William married Mary Kennett in Kelloe, County Durham, in 1713/14. The Duchess of Seaforth was the daughter and heiress of Nicholas Kennett of Coxhoe, county Durham, and educated in France under Jesuits.

== Career ==
Shortly after the accession of George I in 1714, William was ordered to confine himself within Brahan Castle, which belonged to him. He attended the meeting convened by John Erskine, earl of Mar, at Braemar in 1715, when the standard of the Pretender was raised. At the head of over three thousand men, including the Macdonalds, Rosses, and others, he set out in October to join Mar at Perth. John Gordon, earl of Sutherland, endeavoured to bar his passage, but on being attacked retreated to Bonar. Seaforth, after harassing his country and collecting large quantities of booty, continued his march southwards. He was present at the battle of Sheriffmuir.

After the battle, he was nominated by the Chevalier lieutenant-general and commander of the northern counties, and went north to endeavour to recover Inverness, which had been captured for the government by Simon Fraser, lord Lovat. Although joined by Alexander Gordon, marquis of Huntly, he was unable to raise forces sufficient to make way against the Earl of Sutherland, and gave in their submission. Shortly afterwards, Seaforth crossed over to the Isle of Lewis, where he endeavoured to collect a number of his followers; but when a detachment of government troops had been sent against him, he escaped to Ross-shire, whence he set sail for France, reaching St. Germains in February 1716. On 7 May, following he was attainted by parliament and his estates forfeited.

Seaforth accompanied the Earl Marischal in his expedition to the western highlands in 1719. He was severely wounded at the battle of Glenshiel on 10 June, but was carried on board a vessel by his followers, and, escaping to the Western Isles, returned thence to France.

Notwithstanding his forfeiture and in spite of the vigilance of the government, his factor, Donald Murchison, ensured that his followers regularly sent him their rents in his exile. After the passing of the disarming act in 1725 they, however, agreed on his private recommendation to give up their arms, and in future to pay rent to the government on condition that they were discharged of all arrears. To this Wade not only agreed, but also promised to use his influence to secure a pardon for Seaforth. The efforts of Wade on behalf of Seaforth, although strongly opposed by John Campbell, second duke of Argyll, were successful. By letters patent of 12 June 1726, Seaforth was discharged of the penal consequences of his attainder, although the forfeiture was not reversed. From George II he received a grant of the arrears of feu duties due to the crown out of his forfeited estates. Seaforth was led to seek peace with the government, partly on the ground of dissatisfaction with his treatment by the Chevalier. He excused to the Chevalier his acceptance of the terms of the government as a temporary expedient absolutely necessary for the protection of his clan, but the Chevalier was deeply hurt at what he deemed a desertion of his cause.

Seaforth died 8 January 1740 in the Isle of Lewis, and was buried there in the chapel of Ui.

== Ancestry ==
Through his father, Seaforth was descended from Scottish nobility and the High Stewards of Scotland. Through his mother, he is descended from different branches of the House of Herbert and English nobility and royals. He was a direct descendant via his mother of Edward III of England, via John of Gaunt.

Ancestors of William Mackenzie, 5th Earl of Seaforth

16. Kenneth Mackenzie, 1st Lord Mackenzie of Kintail
8. George Mackenzie, 2nd Earl of Seaforth
17. Isobel Ogilvie
4. Kenneth Mackenzie, 3rd Earl of Seaforth
18. Arthur Forbes, 9th Lord Forbes
9. Barbara Forbes
19. The Hon. Jean Elphinstone
2. Kenneth Mackenzie, 4th Earl of Seaforth
20. Sir Roderick Mackenzie of Coigach
10. Sir John Mackenzie of Tarbat
21. Margaret Macleod
5. Isobel Mackenzie
22. Sir George Erskine of Innerteil
11. Margaret Erskine
23. Isobel Browne
1. William Mackenzie, 5th Earl of Seaforth
24. William Herbert, 1st Baron Powis
12. Percy Herbert, 2nd Baron Powis
25. Lady Eleanor Percy
6. William Herbert, 1st Marquess of Powis
26. Sir William Craven
13. Elizabeth Craven
27. Elizabeth Whitmore
3. Lady Frances Herbert
28. Henry Somerset, 1st Marquess of Worcester
14. Edward Somerset, 2nd Marquess of Worcester
29. Anne Russell
7. Lady Elizabeth Somerset
30. Sir William Dormer
15. Elizabeth Dormer
31. Anne Molyneux

== Sources ==
- Hopkins, Paul (2014). Mackenzie, Kenneth, fourth earl of Seaforth and Jacobite first marquess of Seaforth (Online ed.). Oxford DNB.
- Slater, Victor (2007). Herbert, William, styled first marquess of Powis and Jacobite first duke of Powis (Online ed.). Oxford DNB.

Attribution

This article incorporates text from a publication now in the public domain: Henderson, Thomas Finlayson (1893). "Mackenzie, William (d.1740)". In Lee, Sidney (ed.). Dictionary of National Biography. Vol. 35. London: Smith, Elder & Co.

Peerage of Scotland
Preceded by Kenneth Mackenzie	Earl of Seaforth; 1701–1716	Forfeit
Preceded by Kenneth Mackenzie	Chief of Clan Mackenzie; 1701–1740	Succeeded by Kenneth Mackenzie
