= Elizabeth Herbert, Marchioness of Powis =

English court official and noblewoman

The Most Honourable The Dowager Marchioness of Powis
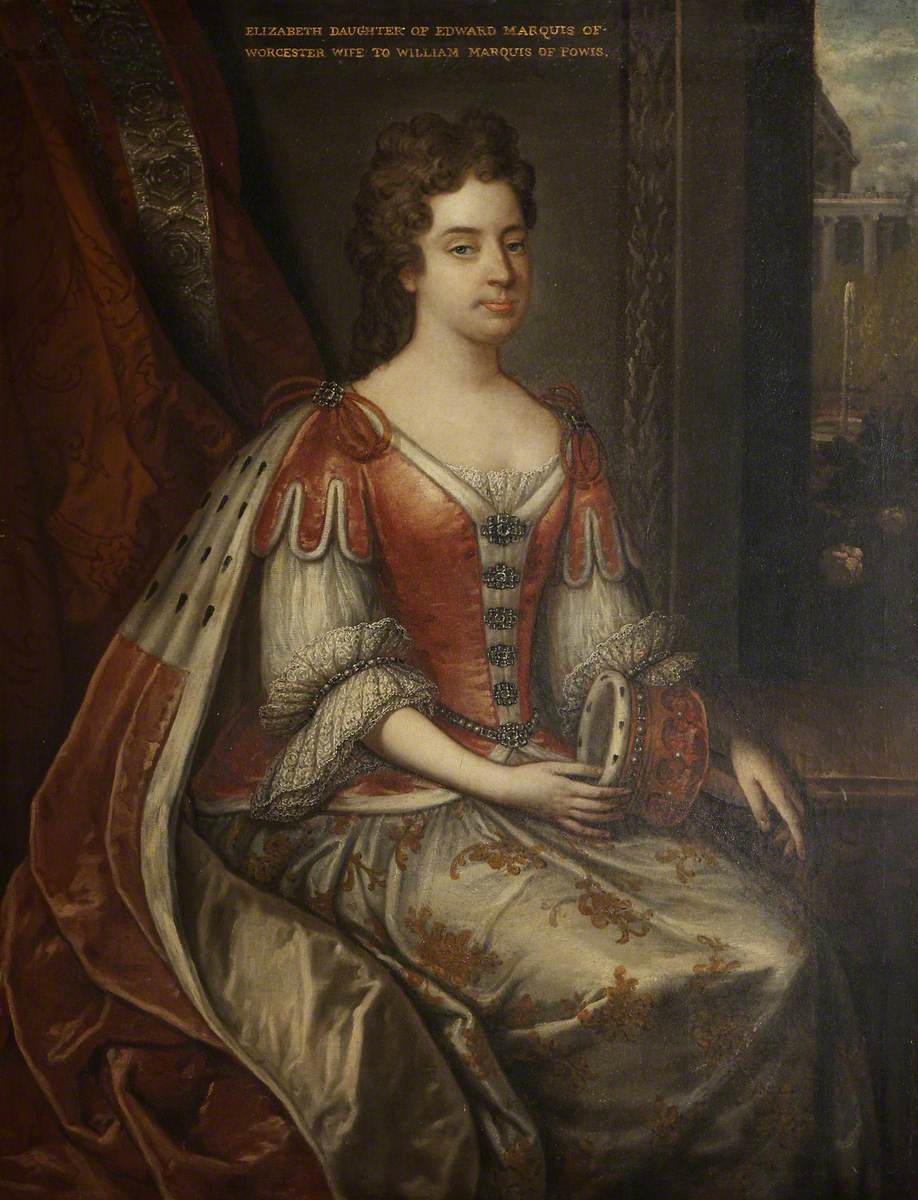
- Born: Lady Elizabeth Somerset c.1634 London
- Died: 16 March 1691; Saint-Germain-en-Laye
- Noble family: Somerset
- Spouse: William Herbert, 1st Marquess of Powis
- Issue: Lady Anne Herbert; Frances Mackenzie, Countess of Seaforth; Lady Mary Herbert; William Herbert, 2nd Marquess of Powis; Lady Lucy Herbert; Winifred Maxwell, Countess of Nithsdale
- Father: Edward Somerset, 2nd Marquess of Worcester
- Mother: Elizabeth Dormer
- Occupation: First Lady of the Bedchamber to Queen Mary

Elizabeth Herbert, Dowager Marchioness of Powis (c.1634 – 16 March 1691), formerly Lady Elizabeth Somerset, was an English court official and noblewoman, the wife of William Herbert, 1st Marquess of Powis. She was the daughter of Edward Somerset, 2nd Marquess of Worcester, and his wife, the former Elizabeth Dormer.

== Family ==
She married William Herbert, then the heir to Percy Herbert, 2nd Baron Powis, on 2 August 1654. He succeeded his father to the title in 1666.

They had six children:

- Lady Anne Herbert (died 1748), who married Francis Smith, 2nd Viscount Carrington
- Lady Frances Herbert, who married Kenneth Mackenzie, 4th Earl of Seaforth, and had children
- Lady Mary Herbert (died 1744), who married three times
- William Herbert, 2nd Marquess of Powis (c.1665-1745)
- Lady Lucy Herbert (1669-1744), who became a nun
- Lady Winifred Herbert (c.1679-1749), who married William Maxwell, 5th Earl of Nithsdale, and had children

In 1674, Herbert was created Earl of Powis, and his wife became a countess. Her portrait, painted around 1674 by John Michael Wright, is held in the Powis Castle collection.

== Popish Plot ==
She was Lady of the Bedchamber to Catherine of Braganza, queen consort of King Charles II of England. However, in 1678, her husband was one of the "Five Catholic Lords" who were falsely accused of treason in the Popish Plot fabricated by Titus Oates, and he was imprisoned in the Tower of London until 1684.

His wife's frantic efforts to secure his release led her into unwise dealings with such unsavoury underworld characters as the notorious informer and confidence trickster Thomas Dangerfield. She had hoped that Dangerfield would discredit her husband's accusers: but Dangerfield, who was "faithless to all" turned on Lady Powis and her friend, the prominent Catholic midwife Elizabeth Cellier , instead and accused them of treason. Fortunately, by the time they came to trial in the summer of 1680, Dangerfield's reputation had sunk so far that they were both easily acquitted.

== Later life ==
On 24 March 1686, her husband was created Marquess of Powis, and his wife became a marchioness. A Catholic, he was loyal to King James II and VII, whom he followed into exile. James created him 1st Duke of Powis and 1st Marquess of Montgomery on 12 January 1689, in the Jacobite peerage. He was subsequently outlawed from England.

The marchioness followed her husband into exile and acted as First Lady of the Bedchamber to James's queen, Mary of Modena, and as Royal Governess to James, Prince of Wales, until her death in 1691.
