= Baron Caryll of Durford =

English Jacobite peerage title

Baron Caryll of Durford (or Dunford) of Harting in West Sussex was a title in the Jacobite Peerage of England created by the dethroned King James II for John Caryll, poet, dramatist and diplomat, with apparently a special remainder to the issue male of his brothers.

The first Baron was succeeded, under the special remainder, by his nephew, John, son of his younger brother, Richard Caryll. The eldest son of John, second Lord Caryll, also John, who predeceased him in 1718, married, in 1712, Lady Mary Mackenzie, daughter of Kenneth Mackenzie, 4th Earl and 1st Jacobite Marquess of Seaforth and his wife, Lady Frances Herbert, daughter of William Herbert, 1st Duke of Powis. The widowed Lady Caryll married secondly, Francis Sempill, 2nd Jacobite Lord Sempill.

The second Baron was succeeded by his grandson, John Baptist Caryll, who served as the Jacobite Secretary of State to Charles Edward Stuart ("King Charles III"), known as the Young Pretender.

== Barons Caryll of Durford (Jacobite Peerage, Before 1698) ==
- John Caryll, 1st Baron Caryll of Durford (1625–1711)
- John Caryll, 2nd Baron Caryll of Durford (1667–1736)
- John Baptist Caryll, 3rd Baron Caryll of Durford (1713–1788)
