= Lucy Herbert =

Lucy Herbert may refer to:

- Lucy Somerset (c.1524–1583), served two queens including her stepmother-in-law, Katherine Parr
- Lady Lucy Herbert (1669–1743/44), English aristocrat, canoness regular and devotional writer
- Lucy Herbert, Countess of Powis (1793–1875)
