= Elizabeth Herbert =

Elizabeth Herbert may refer to:

- Elizabeth Somerset, Baroness Herbert, née Elizabeth Herbert
- Elizabeth Herbert, Marchioness of Powis (c. 1634–1691)
- Elizabeth Herbert, Countess of Carnarvon (1752–1826)
- Kitty Herbert, Countess of Carnarvon (Elizabeth Herbert, 1772–1813)
- Elizabeth Herbert, Countess of Pembroke (1737–1831)
- Elizabeth Herbert, Baroness Herbert of Lea (1822–1911)
