= John Baptist Caryll =

British noble (1713–1788)

John Baptist Caryll (13 December 1713 – 7 March 1788) was an English Jacobite official. He was the third Baron Caryll of Durford in the Jacobite peerage.

== Biography ==
Caryll was the eldest son of the Honourable John Caryll (28 December 1687 – 6 April 1718), who predeceased his father, the 2nd Baron Caryll, and his wife, Lady Mary Mackenzie, daughter of the 4th Earl of Seaforth and Lady Frances Herbert.

After succeeding his grandfather, he got into financial difficulties, as a penalised Catholic, and sold the family properties at West Grinstead and Harting, West Sussex. He entered the household in Rome of the so-called "Young Pretender", the exiled Stuart claimant, recognised by Jacobites as "King Charles III". Charles Edward Stuart appointed Caryll his Secretary of State and made him a Knight of the Thistle. Caryll returned to France in 1777 and died at Dunkirk on 7 March 1788.

Political offices
Preceded by Andrew Lumisden	Jacobite Secretary of State; 1768–1777	Succeeded by Vacant
Peerage of England
Preceded by John Caryll	— TITULAR — Baron Caryll of Durford; Jacobite peerage 1736–1788	Extinct
