= Thomas Dangerfield =

English conspirator

The pillorying and the whipping of Thomas Dangerfield, June 1685

Thomas Dangerfield (c. 1650 – 22 June 1685) was an English conspirator, who became one of the principal informers in the Popish Plot. His violent death at the hands of the barrister Robert Francis was clearly a homicide, although whether the killing was murder or manslaughter was a matter of considerable public debate at the time.

== Biography ==
Dangerfield was born about 1650 at Waltham Abbey, Essex, the son of a farmer. At the age of about 12 in about 1662, he ran away from home to London, and never returned to his home.

He began his career of crime by robbing his father of both horses and money, and, after a rambling life, which brought him to Scotland, France, Spain and Portugal, took to coining counterfeit money, for which offence and numerous others he was many times imprisoned: it was said later that to describe his career one need simply list every capital crime known to English law. Lord Chief Justice Scroggs later referred to him with contempt as "that fellow from Chelmsford gaol", and he also spent time in Newgate Prison. He used a number of aliases, most commonly Willoughby.

== Popish Plot ==
False to everyone, he first tried to involve James Scott, 1st Duke of Monmouth and others by concocting information about a Presbyterian plot against the throne, and this having been proved a lie, he pretended to have discovered a Catholic plot against Charles II. This was known as the Mealtub Plot, from the place where the incriminating documents were hidden at his suggestion, and found by the King's officers by his information.

Mrs Elizabeth Cellier, in whose house the meal tub was found, was a well-known Roman Catholic midwife and almoner to Elizabeth Herbert, Marchioness of Powis. She had rescued Dangerfield from a debtors' prison and befriended him when he posed as a Catholic. She was, with her patroness Lady Powis, tried for high treason but acquitted in 1680: with the general waning of hysteria, men as disreputable as Dangerfield were no longer considered to be credible witnesses.

For a time Dangerfield was used as a secondary witness in the Popish Plot trials to supplement the evidence of Titus Oates and William Bedloe. However, his character was so unsavoury, even compared to that of the other informers, that Chief Justice William Scroggs, who knew his record of crime thoroughly, began instructing juries to disregard the evidence of "so notorious a villain.... I shall shake all such fellows before I am done". When Dangerfield protested publicly that he had sincerely repented of his former crimes, Scroggs, who did not tolerate interruptions in his Court, roared: "What, do you with all the mischief that Hell hath in you, dare to brave it in a court of justice?"

Dangerfield, when examined at the bar of the House of Commons, made other charges against prominent Roman Catholics, and attempted to defend his character by publishing, among other pamphlets, Dangerfield's Narrative.

== Death; the fate of Robert Francis ==
The publication of his Narrative led, once public opinion had turned against the informers, to his trial for libel (Kenyon notes that he could not as the law stood be tried for perjury, as no-one had actually been convicted on his evidence). Dangerfield went into hiding in 1684 as soon as he heard about the threatened trial, but when James succeeded as King in February 1685 the new Government made a determined search for him and found him. He was tried and speedily convicted. On 20 June 1685 he received his sentence, which was to stand in the pillory on two consecutive days, be whipped from Aldgate to Newgate, and two days later from Newgate to Tyburn.

On his way back from the first whipping on 22 June Dangerfield, who rather surprisingly was travelling by coach, got into an argument at Hatton Garden with a barrister, Robert Francis, who made a jeering remark, on the lines of "How do you, after your little race?" Dangerfield in return spat on him and called him a son of a whore, whereupon Francis struck Dangerfield in the eye with his cane: the cane apparently entered the brain, and Dangerfield died shortly afterwards from the blow.

Francis was tried and convicted for murder, and sentenced to death, despite his insistence that he never meant to kill Dangerfield. Several witnesses testified that on the contrary he had deliberately stabbed at Dangerfield's eye, and there was also some evidence that he had said that "he would save the hangman the trouble of killing Dangerfield". Nonetheless the verdict of murder came as a surprise to the public, the general view being that the death "could scarce be even called manslaughter". Sir John Reresby wrote that he was sure that Francis had had no intention of killing Dangerfield, "for he had a sword by his side, which was a more likely thing to kill him than that little cane, indeed the smallest that ever I saw". King James II was solicited strongly to grant Francis a royal pardon, on the basis of his previously blameless life, but, despite his low opinion of Dangerfield, he said that it would be wrong to let his murderer go unpunished, and Francis was duly executed on 24 July 1685.

Sir John Bramston in a contemptuous epitaph wrote that Dangerfield deserved no pity: "he had been a highway thief, a cheat, a little rogue.. but there is an end of him".

== The Narrative - aftermath ==
In 1684 Sir William Williams, later Solicitor General, who as Speaker of the House of Commons had authorised the publication of Dangerfield's Narrative in 1680, was heavily fined for a libel on James II and another on Lord Peterborough as a result. James, with more magnanimity than he usually showed to political opponents, reduced both fines, and later restored Williams to royal favour and appointed him Solicitor General.

== In fiction ==
He is the subject, and perhaps the author, of Don Tomazo, or The Juvenile Rambles of Thomas Dangerfield (1680), a comic, self-consciously literary novel that presents Dangerfield as a clever and resourceful rogue. It is reprinted in Spiro Peterson's The Counterfeit Lady Unveiled and Other Criminal Fiction of Seventeenth-Century England (1961) and in Paul Salzman's Anthology of Seventeenth-Century Fiction (1991).
