= Terregles House =

Country house in Scotland

Coordinates: 55°05′01″N 3°40′20″W

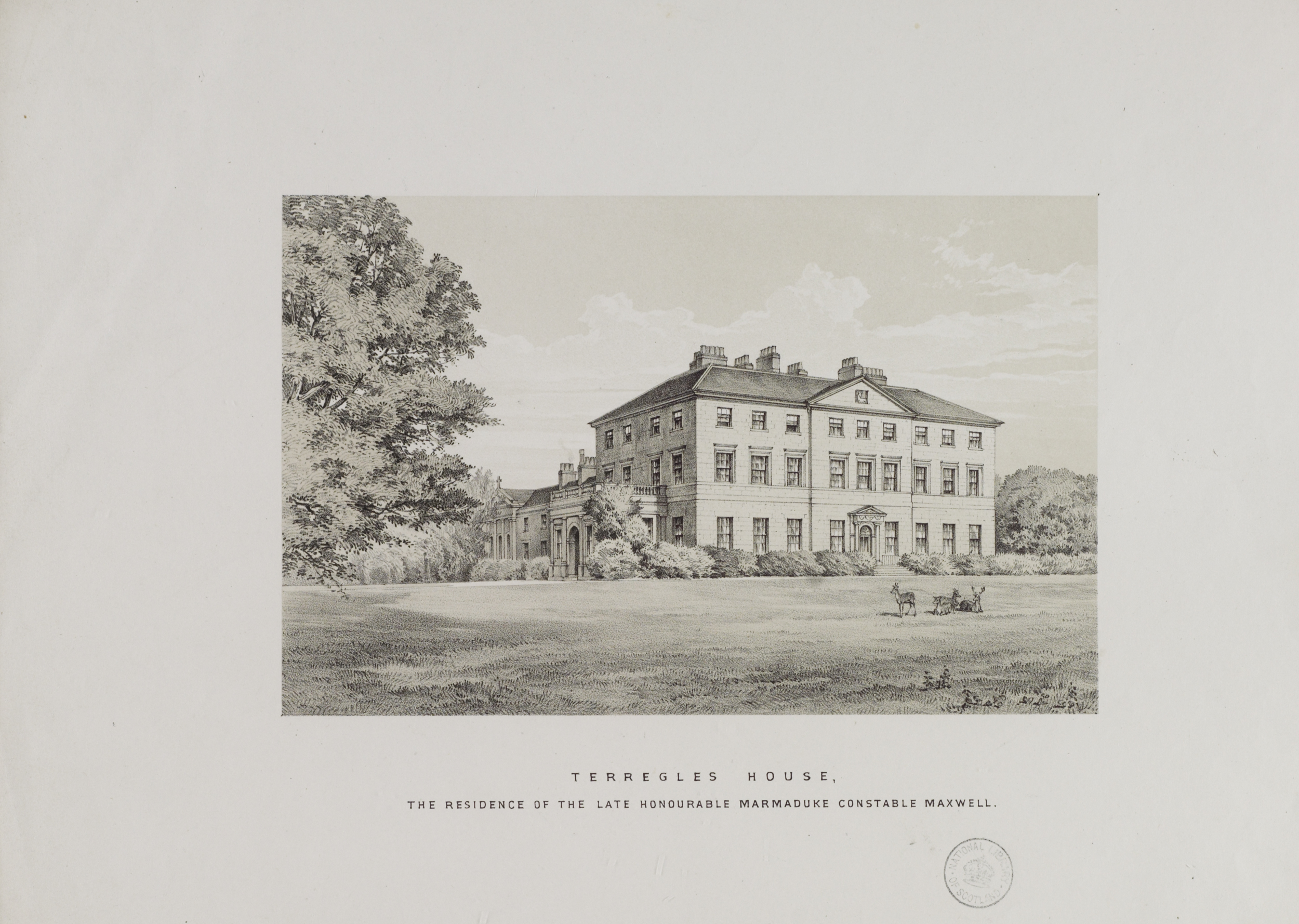
Terregles House, mid 19th century view

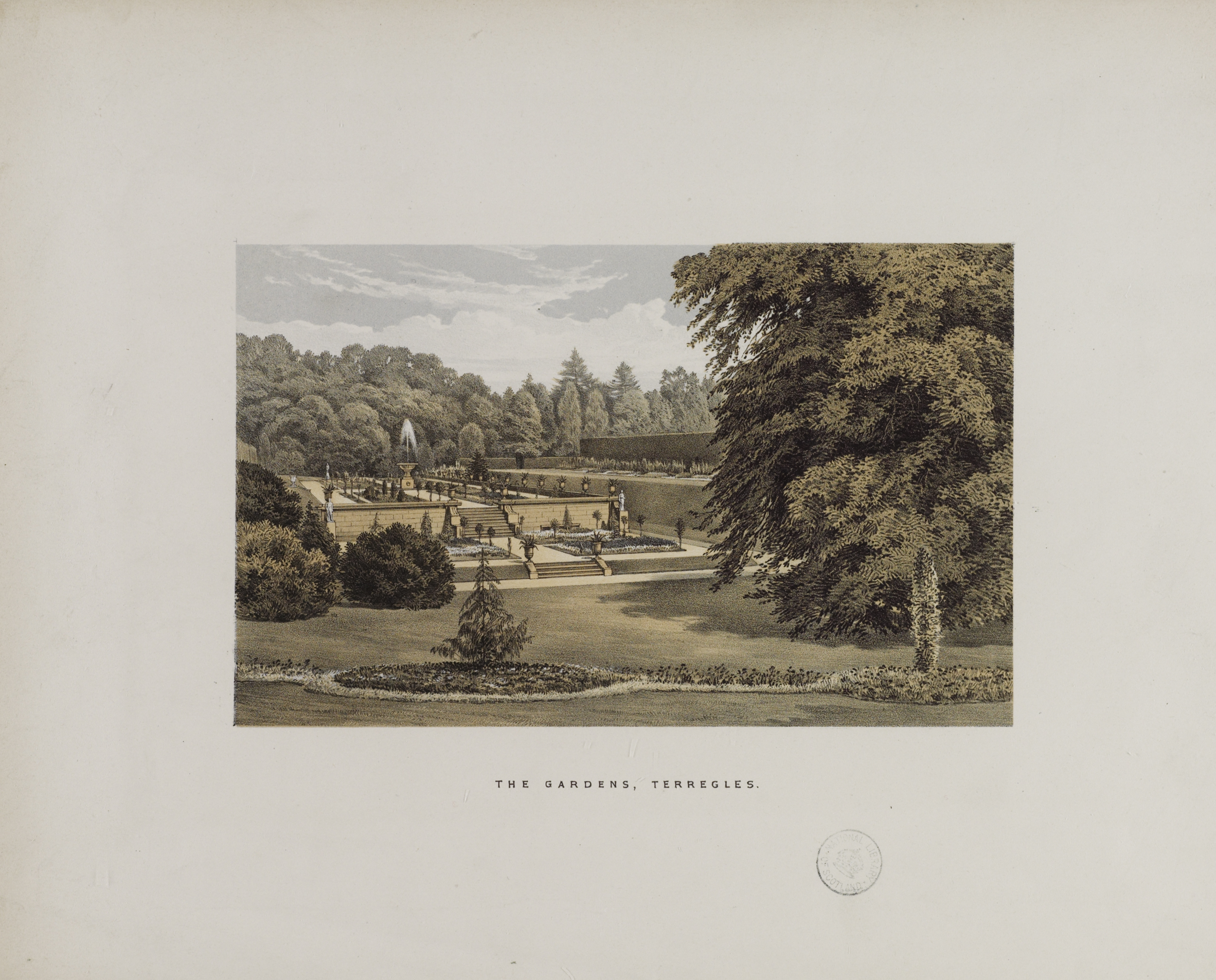
Terregles House gardens, mid 19th century view

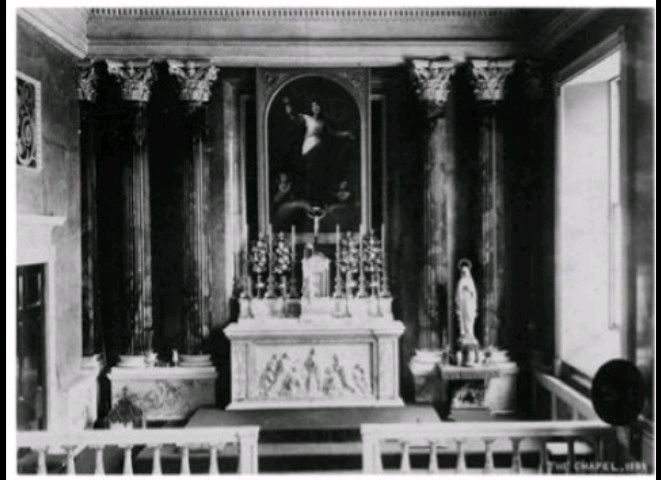
The Domestic Chapel

Terregles House was a late 18th-century country house, located near Terregles, in the historical county of Kirkcudbrightshire around 2 miles west of Dumfries in Scotland. It replaced an earlier tower house, which had served as the seat of the Lords Herries, and later the Earls of Nithsdale, until William Maxwell, the 5th Earl, forfeited his titles in 1716.

== History ==
In 1776, Winifred Maxwell, the granddaughter of the 5th Earl of Nithsdale, served as heir general to her father, inheriting the Terregles property. In 1788 she and her husband, William Haggerston Constable of Everingham, commissioned the Yorkshire architect Thomas Atkinson to build a new house to replace the old tower house. On completion the old house was demolished. The new house became home to the Constable-Maxwell family and their seven children.

The house incorporated a domestic Catholic chapel which also served the local Catholic population until the opening in 1813 of St. Andrew's Church in Shakespeare Street, Dumfries. The chaplains at Terregles were George Maxwell SJ, 1764-1772; John Pepper SJ, 1772-1810 and Aubine Danneville 1810–1816.

Sir Robert Smirke was employed to extend the house and build a new stable block in 1831.

In 1848 Winifred's grandson, William Constable-Maxwell, obtained an Act of Parliament restoring him as the descendant of William Maxwell, 5th Earl of Nithsdale, and ten years later the House of Lords declared him the 10th Lord Herries of Terregles. His descendants, the Constable-Maxwells, lived at Terregles until the early 20th century when the property was let out.

The estates were sold after World War I, and in the early 1930s the house and contents were also sold. The house was one of a number of country houses in the area requisitioned for use by the Norwegians during the Second World War. King Haakon VII of Norway is known to have visited his troops but it is unconfirmed if he visited Terregles. During the war he and his family lived at Foliejon Park near Windsor in Berkshire.

The property was not reoccupied after the war, and was stripped of its contents in the 1950s. It was demolished with explosives in 1962, as it had become infested with dry rot. The former stables, designed by Smirke and built in 1831, are now a category A listed building.

== Terregles Queir ==
The choir of Terregles Church was built by the Catholic Maxwell family as their burial crypt in 1585, post Reformation. It was renovated in 1875 for Alfred Constable-Maxwell by the Dumfries architect James Barbour. An annual Requiem Mass for the family is celebrated here in June and is organised by their descendants the Maxwell-Stuart family of Traquair House. The Queir is attached to but separate from the parish church. At the head of the stairway leading down to the crypt stands the sculpture "The Angel of the Resurrection" by John Birnie Philip (1824 - 1875).
