= The English Princess =

1667 play

- Original language: English
- Written by: John Caryll
- Genre: Tragedy

Premiere
- Date: 7 March 1667
- Place: Lincoln's Inn Fields Theatre, London

The English Princess; Or, The Death Of Richard The Third is a 1667 tragedy by the English writer John Caryll. It is set around the downfall of Richard III. It was performed at Lincoln's Inn Fields by the Duke's Company. Although the full cast is unknown it included Thomas Betterton as Richard III, Henry Harris as Duke of Richmond and William Smith as Sir William Stanley. In his diary Samuel Pepys described it as a "a most sad, melancholy play, and pretty good; but nothing eminent in it, as some tragedys are" At the end of the show actress Moll Davis came on stage to dance a jig and announcer the next day's performance.

== Bibliography ==
- Howe, Elizabeth. The First English Actresses: Women and Drama, 1660-1700. Cambridge University Press, 1992.
- Nicoll, Allardyce. History of English Drama, 1660-1900: Volume 1, Restoration Drama, 1660-1700. Cambridge University Press, 1952.
- Roberts, David. Thomas Betterton: The Greatest Actor of the Restoration Stage. Cambridge University Press, 2010.
- Van Lennep, W. The London Stage, 1660-1800: Volume One, 1660-1700. Southern Illinois University Press, 1960.
