= John Caryll (senior) =

British baron and poet

John Caryll (1625–1711), 1st Baron Caryll of Durford in the Jacobite Peerage, was a poet, dramatist, and diplomat. He should not be confused with his nephew, John Caryll the younger, the dedicatee of Alexander Pope's The Rape of the Lock. The former is sometimes referred to as Mr. Secretary Caryll, and the latter as Squire Caryll.

== Life ==
Caryll was born at West Harting in Sussex, England. He was the son and heir of an elder John Caryll, a Roman catholic royalist settled at that time in West Harting, in Sussex. His mother was the Hon. Katherine Petre (died 1682), a daughter of William, second Baron Petre. He received part of his education at the English College of St. Omer, in Artois, and part at the Venerable English College in Rome. He married Margaret, a daughter and co-heir of Sir Maurice Drummond, but she died in 1656 leaving no children.

=== Literary endeavours ===
During the reign of Charles II of England he produced several plays and poems. In poetry his chief performances were a translation of Ovid's Epistle of Briseïs to Achilles, first appearing in 1680 in a work entitled Ovid's Epistles, translated by several hands, and afterwards separately; also a translation of Virgil's first Eclogue, published in 1683.

He completed two plays which were brought out at the Duke of York's Theatre. The English Princess, or, the death of Richard III, was a tragedy written in 1666. Samuel Pepys, who saw this piece acted on 7 March 1667, found it "pretty good". A comedy entitled Sir Salomon Single, or the Cautious Coxcomb, upon the pattern of Molière's The School for Wives, came out in 1671, .

=== Service in the Jacobite court ===
In 1679, during the so-called "Popish Plot" mania, Caryll, being a prominent Roman catholic, was committed to the Tower of London, but was soon let out on bail. When James II of England succeeded to the throne in 1685, he sent Caryll as his agent to the court of Pope Innocent XI, withdrawing him some months later upon the Earl of Castlemaine's appointment to that post.

Caryll was then appointed secretary to Mary of Modena, queen of James II, in whose service he continued after the Glorious Revolution of 1688, when he followed the exiled royal family across the sea to Saint-Germain. However, no confiscation of his property ensued from his voluntary expatriation until 1696, when, owing to his financial support for a plot to assassinate William of Orange (William III), he was attainted and his estate in West Harting was declared forfeit. His life interest in West Harting was thereupon granted to Lord Cutts, but was redeemed by Caryll's foresaid nephew for £6,000. In exile at Saint-Germain, he was created by the dethroned James II (d. 1701) Baron Caryll of Durford (or Dunford) in West Sussex and was appointed his Joint Secretary of State together with Charles Middleton, 2nd Earl of Middleton from 1694 to 1696.

James's son, the so-called Old Pretender, James Francis Edward Stuart (recognised by Jacobites as "King James III and VIII") re-appointed Caryll as one of his Secretaries of State, a post which he held until his death. In 1700, Caryll published anonymously, with Approbations of John Betham and John Ingleton, a prose version of The Psalmes of David, translated from the Vulgat. The preface declares it to be intended for lay readership, taking Cardinal Bellarmine's Treatise upon the Psalmes for a guide to interpretation: revised editions appeared in the following years. He died 4 September 1711, and was buried near to James II at Saint-Germain-en-Laye, in the Church of English Dominicans in Paris, of which he had been a benefactor. A tablet was placed to his memory in the Scots College.

=== Family succession ===
Having no children, by a special remainder he was succeeded in his Jacobite peerage by his nephew, also named John Caryll. One of his sisters, Mary, became first abbess of the English Benedictine nuns in Dunkirk. A grandson of the above-mentioned nephew served as Secretary to Charles Edward Stuart, called "the Young Pretender", known by Jacobites as "King Charles III".

Peerage of England
New creation	— TITULAR — Baron Caryll of Durford; Jacobite peerage 1698–1711	Succeeded by John Caryll
