= Winifred Maxwell, Countess of Nithsdale =

British aristocrat (c. 1680–1749)

The Right Honourable The Dowager Countess of Nithsdale
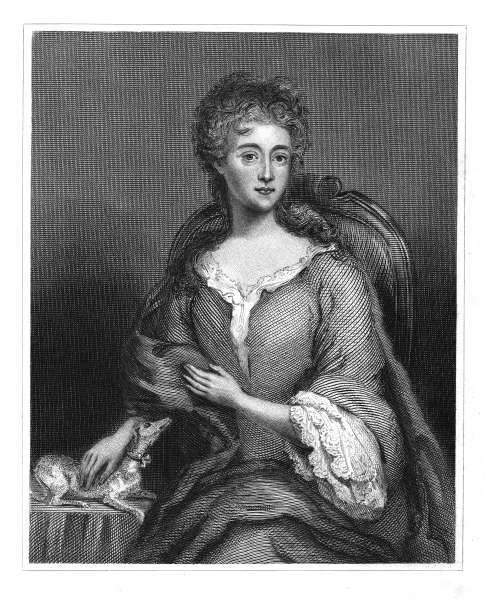
- Born: Winifred Herbert c. 1680
- Died: 1749 (aged 68–69); Rome, Italy
- Noble family: Herbert (by birth); Maxwell (by marriage)
- Spouse: William Maxwell, 5th Earl of Nithsdale (m. 1699; died 1744)
- Father: William Herbert, 1st Marquess of Powis
- Mother: Lady Elizabeth Somerset

Winifred Maxwell, Dowager Countess of Nithsdale (née Lady Winifred Herbert; c. 1680–1749), was a British aristocrat, best known for arranging the daring escape of her husband, William Maxwell, 5th Earl of Nithsdale, from the Tower of London in 1716.

Her father was the 1st Marquess of Powis, and on 2 March 1699, she married the 5th Earl of Nithsdale, a Catholic nobleman. The couple had met at the French court, where Lady Winifred's father was in exile, while Nithsdale was paying his respects to the former King James II of England (James VII of Scotland). While resident at Terregles, Dumfriesshire, Scotland, the couple had five children.

In 1715, Nithsdale joined the Jacobite rebellion, but he was captured at the Battle of Preston and sent to the Tower of London. Having been tried for treason, he was sentenced to death. Winifred, who was at Terregles when she heard of the capture of her husband, followed him to London, making part of the journey on horseback in bitter winter weather. She presented a petition to George I which he refused to receive, and when she knelt before him and took hold of his coat he dragged her half across the room before he could break away. Knowing that there would be no pardon, the countess laid a meticulous plan to rescue her husband from the Tower of London.

The night before the day appointed for William's execution (24 February 1716), with the help of two other Jacobite ladies, Winifred effected his escape from the Tower. She had been admitted to his room, and by exchanging clothes with her maid (including the "Nithsdale Cloak", which is still held by the family), he escaped the attention of his guards. He fled to France, while the countess returned to Scotland to ensure the transfer of the estate to their son. She joined him in to France, and they went from there to Rome in the retinue of the Old Pretender. In Rome, she survived her husband by about five years.

== In literature ==
The story of how Winifred Maxwell contrived her husband's escape from the Tower of London inspired James Hogg's Ballad of the Lord Maxwell first published in the Royal Lady's Magazine in October 1831.
