= John Caryll the younger =

English Jacobite peer (1667-1736)

John Caryll (9 December 1667 – April 1736) was the second Jacobite Baron Caryll of Durford.

== Early life ==
A friend of Alexander Pope, Caryll was the son of Richard Caryll (1635–1701), of West Grinstead, Sussex, and Frances née Bedingfield (c.1644–1704), and nephew and heir of John Caryll, Jacobite first Baron Caryll of Durford.

== Personal life ==
He married, in 1686, Elizabeth, daughter of John Harrington, of Orle Place, Sussex, by whom he had 10 children, 4 sons (2 of whom married and had issue, while one became a Jesuit priest) and 6 daughters (5 of whom became nuns). His remaining daughter, Catherine (1716–48), married Joseph Gage in 1748, just a few months before her death.

== Baron Caryll of Durford ==
John Caryll the younger succeeded his uncle to the title as (second) Baron, after his uncle's death in 1711. His own eldest son (also John) predeceased him, in 1718, and therefore the Jacobite title in 1736 passed to his grandson, John Baptist Caryll, as 3rd Baron, eldest son of the eldest son.

John Baptist Caryll sold the family properties at West Grinstead and Harting, West Sussex, and entered the household in Rome of the so-called "Young Pretender", the exiled Stuart claimant, recognised by Jacobites as "King Charles III". Charles Edward Stuart appointed Caryll his Secretary of State and made him a Knight of the Thistle. Caryll returned to France in 1777 and died at Dunkirk on 7 March 1788. His youngest son moved to Chicago in 1778. Today Caryll's descendants have two legal branches - one in Texas, one in Washington DC.

== Bibliography ==
- Erskine-Hill, Howard (1 November 1975). "'A Principle Profest': John Caryll, second Baron Caryll of Durford (1667-1736)". The Social Milieu of Alexander Pope. ISBN 0300018371. OCLC 1992851.

== Sources ==
- Oxford DNB article: Howard Erskine-Hill, 'Caryll, John, Jacobite second Baron Caryll of Durford (1667–1736)', Oxford Dictionary of National Biography (Oxford University Press, 2004)

Peerage of England
Preceded by John Caryll	— TITULAR — Baron Caryll of Durford; Jacobite peerage 1711–1736	Succeeded by John Baptist Caryll
