= Elizabeth Cellier =

English midwife

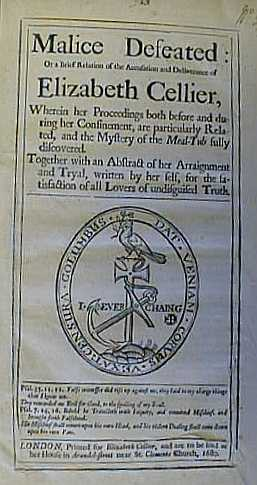
Front page of the pamphlet Malice Defeated, published in 1680 by Elizabeth Cellier to defend her reputation from the charge of treason on which she had just been acquitted

Elizabeth Cellier, commonly known as the "Popish Midwife" (died c. 1688), was a notable Catholic midwife in seventeenth-century England. She stood trial for treason in 1679 for her alleged part in the "Meal-Tub Plot" against the future King James II, but was eventually freed. Cellier was later imprisoned for allegations made in her 1680 work Malice Defeated, in which she recounted the events of the alleged conspiracy against the future King. She later became a pamphleteer and advocated for advancements in the field of midwifery. Cellier published A Scheme for the Foundation of a Royal Hospital in 1687, where she outlined plans for a hospital and a college for instructions in midwifery, as well as proposing that midwives of London should enter into a corporation and use their fees to establish parish houses where any woman could give birth. Cellier resided in London, England until her death.

== Life ==
Elizabeth Cellier was a London midwife, who is known largely through the "Meal-Tub Plot" of 1680. There are no historical records of her prior to her marriage to Peter Cellier, a Frenchman, and her conversion to Catholicism from Anglicanism.

The Jesuit historian John Warner described Cellier as a woman of clear, sharp and lively intelligence but rather poor judgment, a conclusion he reached through her conduct during the Popish Plot.

Many Catholics were incarcerated in 1678 because of the national alarm created by the fabricated Popish Plot of Titus Oates. Edwin Burton writes in his article on Cellier in the Catholic Encyclopedia, that "Mrs. Cellier's charity led her to visit these prisoners, and as her profession allowed her to meet many leading Catholic ladies, she often became the channel of their charity towards the prisoners. Among these ladies was the Countess of Powis, whose kindness was shown to, among others, a clever imposter, Thomas Dangerfield, who had a long criminal record. Becoming aware of this man's lie, Lady Powis ceased to assist him, and in revenge, he decided to denounce her to the government as being involved in a new Popish Plot."

Dangerfield maintained the story that he had been released from prison through the assistance of Powis and Cellier on the condition that he assassinate the king, Lord Shaftesbury, and others. He further claimed that he was to be involved in the fabrication of false plots set to be imposed on people known to be unfavourable to the Catholic cause. One of these conspiracies was to be based on a document which, he alleged, was hidden in a meal tub in Cellier's house. A search was made, and the paper in question was found in a meal tub. It charged with treason most of the leading Protestants, including the king's natural son, the Duke of Monmouth, the Earl of Shaftesbury, and William Waller, who was the very official charged with the search. Lady Powis and Mrs. Cellier were arrested, as were some other Catholics, among them the Earl of Castlemaine.

Cellier's trial took place on 11 June 1680. She was charged with high treason, but the only evidence against her was that of Dangerfield himself, and she had little difficulty in proving him a witness entirely unworthy of credence – the Lord Chief Justice, William Scroggs, had already begun instructing juries to ignore the evidence of "so notorious a villain". Cellier was found not guilty, and Dangerfield himself was arrested instead on account of a felony, for which he had been previously outlawed. After Cellier's acquittal, she published a brief relation of the whole affair under the title of Malice Defeated in 1680. Dangerfield, while undergoing a public whipping in 1685, was accidentally killed in a fight with a barrister, Robert Francis, who, to the surprise of the general public, was hanged for murder.

The publication of Malice Defeated led not only to a long series of pamphlets for and against Cellier, but also to her second prosecution. The charge this time was that of libel against the king and the ministry, because Cellier had alleged that two witnesses in the Edmund Berry Godfrey case had been tortured, a charge that, in the case of Miles Prance, was most likely true. The real focus of this prosecution, according to Roger North, was to prevent Cellier from giving evidence in favour of the imprisoned Catholic peers. For this, she was sentenced to pay a fine of £1,000 and to stand three times in the pillory.

During the reign of King James II, Cellier proposed the foundation of a corporation of skilled midwives and a foundling hospital. The fees would be used to set up parish houses where any woman could give birth.

It is stated that Cellier is buried in Great Missenden Church, Buckinghamshire.

== Publications ==
- Malice Defeated (1680)
- A scheme for the Foundation of a Royal Hospital and raising a revenue of £5000 or £6000 a year by and for the maintenance of a Corporation of skilful midwives (1687), printed in the "Harleian Miscellany" (IV, 142) and in Somers Tracts (II, 243)
- To Dr. – An answer to his Queries concerning the College of Midwives (1687–88)

== In literature ==
Cellier is an important character in Alison MacLeod's historical novel The Portingale, a biography of Catherine of Braganza.
