= Terregles =

Coordinates: 55.079°N 3.676°W

Terregles: Scottish Gaelic: Tìr na h-Eaglaise
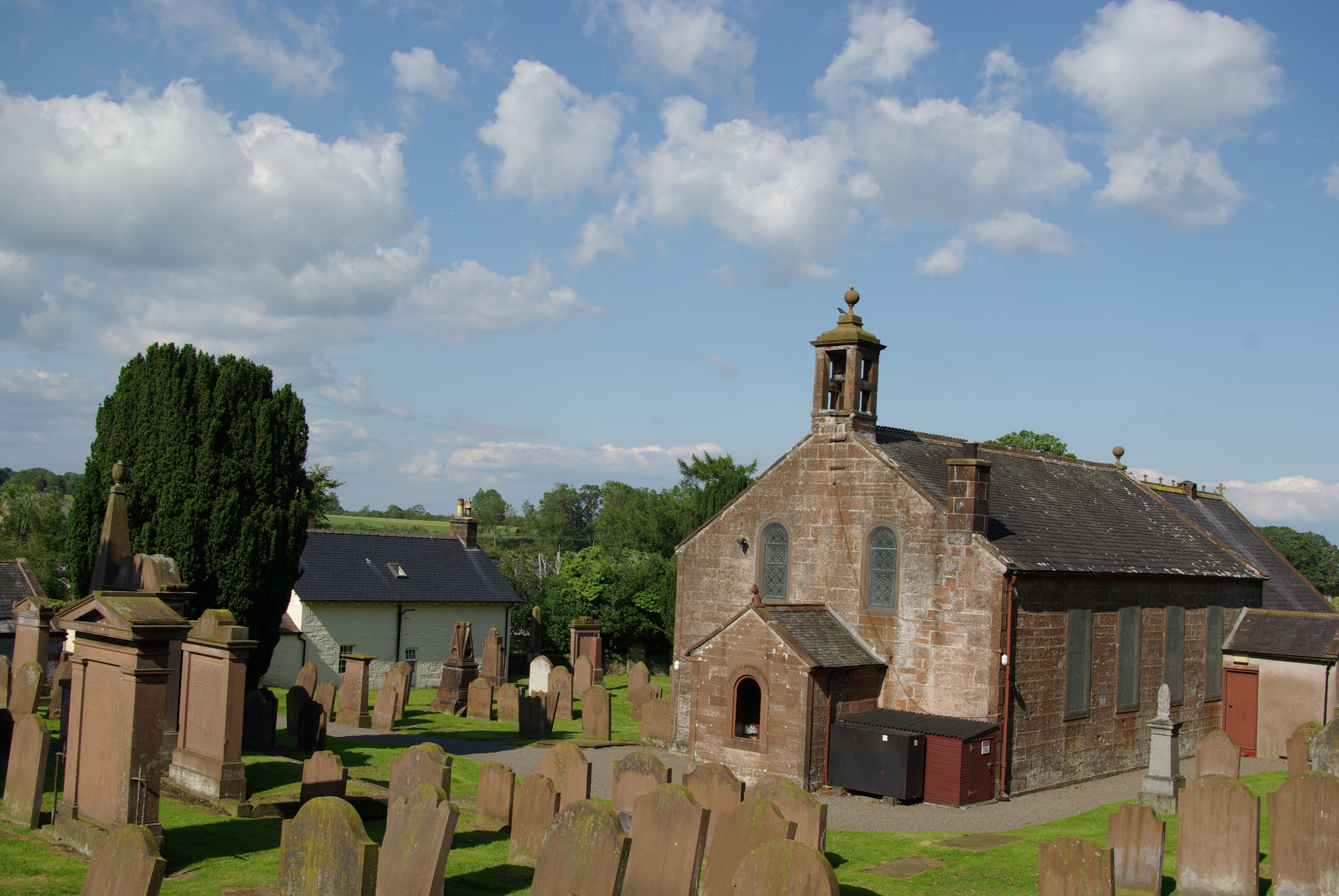
- Terregles Parish Church

- Location within Scotland
- Lieutenancy area: Dumfries
- Country: Scotland
- Sovereign state: United Kingdom
- Police: Scotland
- Fire: Scottish
- Ambulance: Scottish

Terregles (/ˈtɛrəɡəlz, ˈtrɛɡəlz/) is a village and civil parish near Dumfries, in Dumfries and Galloway, Scotland. It lies in the former county of Kirkcudbrightshire.

The name Terregles, recorded as Travereglis in 1359, is from Cumbric *trev-ïr-eglẹ:s. *Trev refers to a settlement and *eglẹ:s is a borrowing of Latin ecclesia, 'church building'. (Modern Welsh Tref yr Eglwys/ Tref Eglwys). James argues that the name dates to no earlier than the 10th century.

The parish contains the ruins of Lincluden Collegiate Church and the site of Terregles House, once the seat of William Maxwell, last Earl of Nithsdale.

To travel to Terregles from Dumfries the main artery out of the town is Terregles Street. Terregles Street is home to Queen of the South F.C.'s football ground, Palmerston Park. Terregles Street become Terregles Road at the Summerhill area on the edge of Dumfries. As the name suggests Terregles Road is the road to the village of Terregles, around a further 2 miles away.

The parish includes the village of Terregles and surrounding rural area, but at the eastern end of the parish also includes Lincluden and adjoining areas which form part of the urban area of Dumfries. Part of the parish was included in the burgh of Maxwelltown, which was created in 1810 and abolished in 1929 when it was absorbed into the burgh of Dumfries. The part of the parish in the burgh was therefore transferred in 1929 from Kirkcudbrightshire to Dumfriesshire. The burgh of Dumfries was further enlarged in 1938 to take in the Lincluden area. The parish of Terregles therefore straddled the two counties from 1929 until further local government reform in 1975 abolished the administrative counties, and both parts of the parish became part of the Nithsdale district in the Dumfries and Galloway region. The whole parish has therefore been included in the Dumfries lieutenancy area since 1975.

== See also ==
- Lord Herries of Terregles

== List of listed buildings ==
List of listed buildings in Terregles, Dumfries and Galloway
