= Lady Lucy Herbert =

English aristocrat

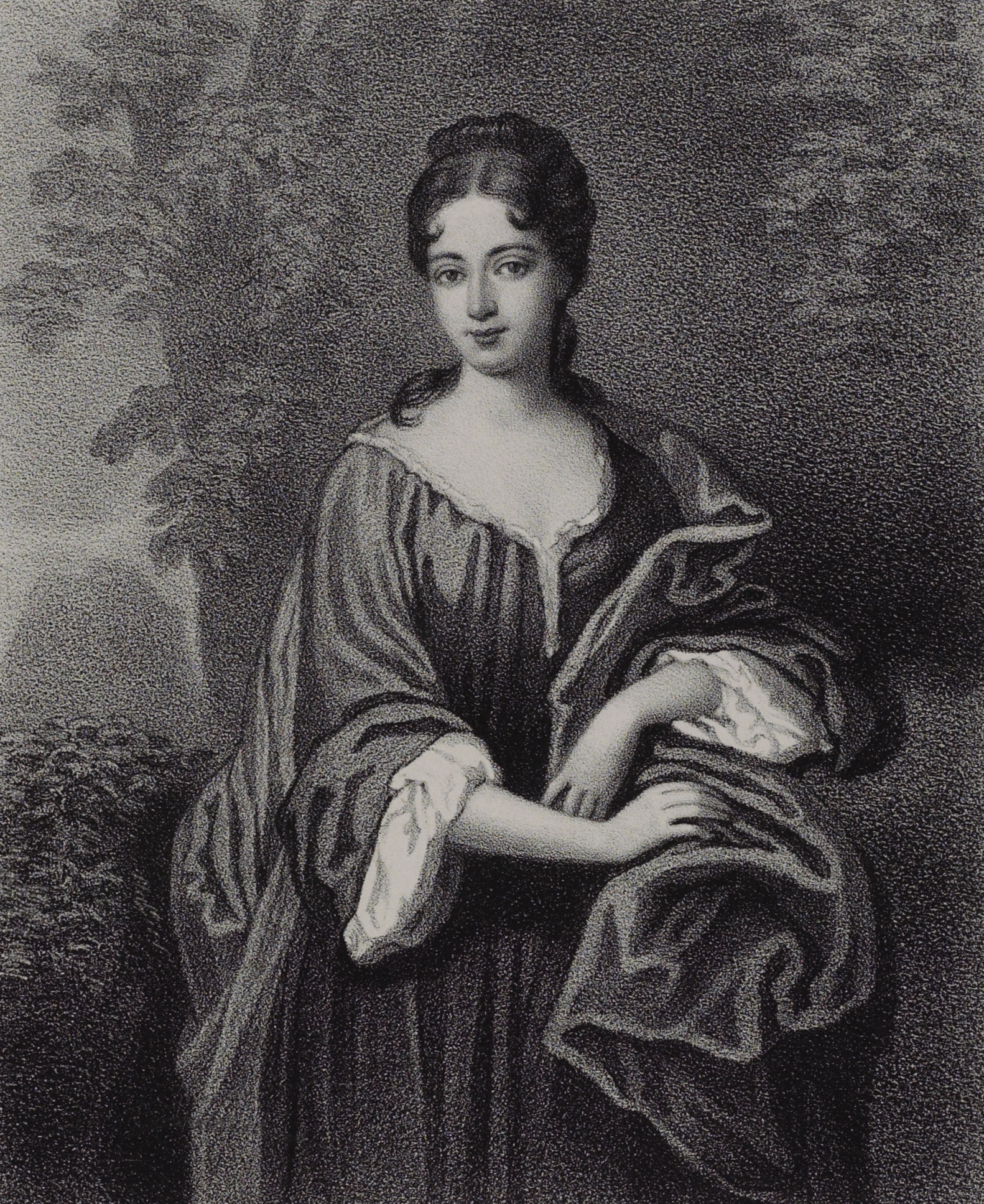
Lady Lucy Herbert

Lady Lucy Herbert CRSA (1669 – 19 January 1743/44) was an English aristocrat who became a canoness regular and devotional writer in Flanders.

== Life ==
Herbert was the fourth daughter of William Herbert, 1st Marquis of Powis, a leading Catholic nobleman, by his wife Elizabeth Somerset, younger daughter of Edward Somerset, 2nd Marquis of Worcester.

She left England for the Spanish Netherlands, where she was admitted to the priory of the English canonesses regular at Bruges around 1690. She professed solemn vows as a full member of the monastic community in 1693, and was elected prioress of the community in 1709. Under her leadership the convent gained more members. She imported a marble altar from Rome and made improvements including building a chaplain's house and rebuilding the church.

She died in Bruges in 1743 or 1744.

== Writings ==
- 'Several excellent Methods of hearing Mass,’ Bruges, 1722, 8vo; 1742, 12mo; [London], 1791, 12mo.
- 'Several Methods and Practices of Devotions appertaining to a Religious Life,’ Bruges, 1743, 12mo; [London], 1791, 12mo.

These two works, together with her 'Meditations,’ are reprinted in The Devotions of the Lady Lucy Herbert of Powis, edited by the Rev. John Morris, S.J., London, 1873, 12mo.
