= William Herbert, 1st Marquess of Powis =

English noble, Jacobite

The Most Honourable The Marquess of Powis KG, PC
- Marquess of Powis
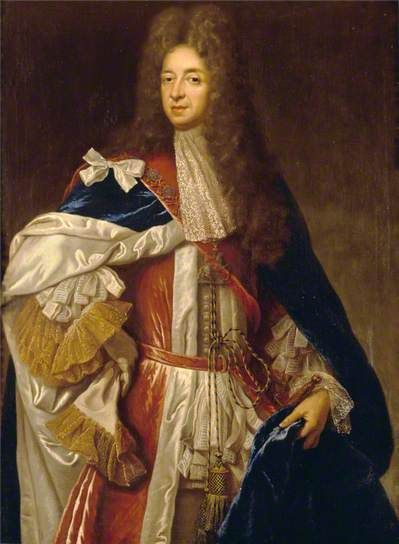
- Portrait of Lord Powis, attributed to François de Troy

Lord Lieutenant of Cheshire
- Reign: 1688 - 1688
- Predecessor: The Earl of Derby
- Successor: The Earl of Derby
- Born: William Herbert; 1626
- Died: 2 June 1696 (aged 69–70); St Germain
- Spouse: Lady Elizabeth Somerset (m. 1654; died 1691)
- Issue: Frances Mackenzie, Countess of Seaforth; William Herbert, 2nd Marquess of Powis; Lady Mary Maxwell; Anne Smith, Viscountess Carrington; Winifred Maxwell, Countess of Nithsdale
- Parents: Percy Herbert, 2nd Baron Powis; Elizabeth Craven

William Herbert, 1st Marquess of Powis, KG, PC (1626 – 2 June 1696) was an English nobleman, best remembered for his suffering during the Popish Plot. He succeeded his father as 3rd Baron Powis in 1667 and was created Earl of Powis in 1674 by King Charles II and Viscount Montgomery, of the Town of Montgomery, and Marquess of Powis in 1687 by King James II, having been appointed to the Privy Council in 1686.

== Early life ==
He was the only son of Percy Herbert, 2nd Baron Powis and the former Elizabeth Craven. His only sibling was Mary Herbert, who married George Talbot, Lord Talbot, eldest son and heir apparent of John Talbot, 10th Earl of Shrewsbury.

His paternal grandparents were William Herbert, 1st Baron Powis and the former Lady Eleanor Percy (third daughter of Henry Percy, 8th Earl of Northumberland). His mother was the eldest surviving daughter of Sir William Craven, Lord Mayor of London, and a sister to Mary Craven (wife of Thomas Coventry, 2nd Baron Coventry), William Craven, 1st Earl of Craven and John Craven, 1st Baron Craven of Ryton.

== Career ==
A cousin of the 1st Baron Herbert of Cherbury, Powis was, together with his wife, one of the leaders of the Roman Catholic party. He was one of the "Five Catholic Lords" falsely accused by Titus Oates in the Popish Plot of conspiring to kill the King and as a result spent six years in the Tower of London awaiting trial; his wife's desperate efforts to free him led her to fabricate the "Meal-Tub plot" for which she narrowly escaped being convicted for treason herself. Powis was finally freed in 1684.

He remained faithful to the deposed King James after the Glorious Revolution of 1688. It was he who spirited away Queen Mary and the infant James, Prince of Wales, and took them into their French exile. As a reward, he was created "Duke of Powis" and "Marquess of Montgomery" in the Jacobite Peerage by King James.

In 1690, Powis landed in Ireland with James, where he acted as one of his principal advisers. James appointed him to his Irish Privy Council and made him Lord Chamberlain. He remained in Ireland until the king's flight back to France after the Battle of the Boyne, and settled again at the exiled Jacobite Court at St Germain. Powis was a prominent figure in the Jacobite Court, serving as Lord Steward and Lord Chamberlain of the household, but he seems to have been rather marginal in the king's counsels. His wife continued as Principal Lady of the Bedchamber to Queen Mary of Modena and Royal Governess to James, Prince of Wales until her death on 11 March 1691.

James made Powis a Knight of the Garter in April 1692. Nevertheless, others exercised more influence at Court as Powis struggled to maintain the dignity of a royal household on an insufficient income. Having lost estates valued at £10,000 a year, he had given up more than most for the Jacobite cause.

== Personal life ==
In July 1654, Herbert married Lady Elizabeth Somerset (c. 1633–1691), a daughter of Edward Somerset, 2nd Marquess of Worcester. Together, they had six children, a son and heir and five daughters, one of whom, Winifred, married William Maxwell, 5th Earl of Nithsdale, who was condemned to death for high treason for participating in the Jacobite rising of 1715. Lady Nithsdale famously organised her husband's escape from the Tower of London.

He died, aged about seventy, on 2 June 1696, after a riding accident in St Germain, and was buried there the next day. He was succeeded by his only son William Herbert, Viscount Montgomery (Jacobite Marquess of Montgomery), as second Marquess of Powis and (Jacobite second Duke of Powis) (1665–1745), who was later jailed in the Tower as a Jacobite and fought a long battle in the courts to retain some of his property, resulting in the restoration of his family's estates. He was relieved of the attainder placed on his father and was restored to the forfeited peerages in the rank of marquess in 1722.

=== Issue ===
Name	Birth	Death	Notes
Frances Mackenzie, Countess of Seaforth	1659	1732	married 1680, Kenneth Mackenzie, 4th Earl of Seaforth; had issue
William Herbert, 2nd Marquess of Powis	1660	1745	married 1691 (1695?), Mary Preston; had issue
Lady Mary Maxwell	1661	1744	married firstly, Richard Molyneux (son of Caryll Molyneux, 3rd Viscount Molyneux); no issue married secondly in 1690, Francis Browne, 4th Viscount Montagu; no issue married thirdly in 1718, Sir George Maxwell of Orchardtoun, 3rd Bt.; no issue
Anne Smith, Viscountess Carrington	1662	1748	married 1687, Francis Smith, 2nd Viscount Carrington; no issue
Lady Lucy Herbert	1668	1743	became a canoness regular and devotional writer
Winifred Maxwell, Countess of Nithsdale	1680	1749	married 1699, William Maxwell, 5th Earl of Nithsdale; had issue

Honorary titles
Preceded by The Earl of Derby	Custos Rotulorum of Cheshire; 1688–1689	Succeeded by The Lord Delamer
Preceded by The Earl of Derby	Lord Lieutenant of Cheshire; 1688	Succeeded by The Earl of Derby
Preceded by Andrew Newport	Custos Rotulorum of Montgomeryshire; 1687–1689	Succeeded by The Lord Herbert of Chirbury
Preceded by Sir Richard Myddelton, Bt	Custos Rotulorum of Denbighshire; 1688–1689	Succeeded by Sir Robert Cotton, Bt
Preceded by Sir John Wynn, Bt	Custos Rotulorum of Merionethshire; 1688–1689	Succeeded by Sir William Wiliams, Bt
Peerage of England
New creation	— TITULAR — Duke of Powis; Jacobite peerage 1689–1696	Succeeded by William Herbert
New creation	Marquess of Powis; 1687–1696	Succeeded by William Herbert
New creation	Earl of Powis; 1674–1696	Succeeded by William Herbert
Preceded by Percy Herbert	Baron Powis; 1667–1696	Succeeded by William Herbert
