= William Maxwell, 5th Earl of Nithsdale =

Scottish nobleman

William Maxwell
- 5th Earl of Nithsdale
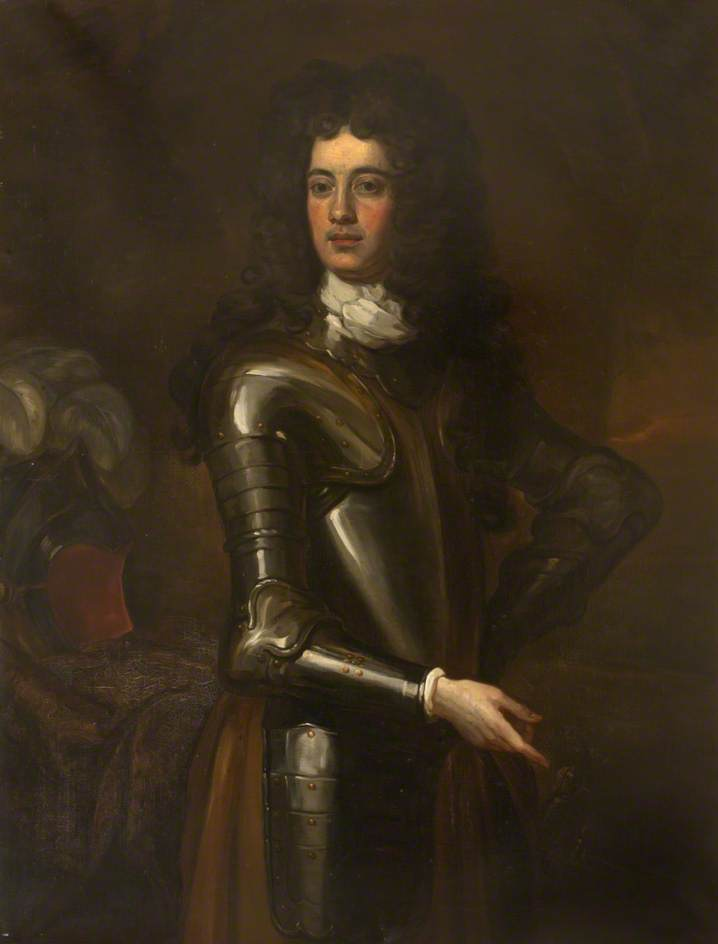
- Tenure: 1683–1716
- Predecessor: Robert Maxwell, 4th Earl of Nithsdale
- Successor: Title forfeited
- Born: 1676; Terregles Castle, Kirkcudbrightshire
- Died: 2 March 1744 (aged 67–68); Rome, Papal States (now Italy)
- Noble family: Maxwell
- Spouse: Lady Winifred Herbert (m. 1699)
- Issue: William Maxwell, Lord Maxwell; Anne Bellew, Baroness Bellew
- Father: Robert Maxwell, 4th Earl of Nithsdale
- Mother: Lady Lucy Douglas

William Maxwell, 5th Earl of Nithsdale (1676 – 2 March 1744), was a Roman Catholic member of the Scottish nobility who took part in the Jacobite rising of 1715. He was attainted with his titles forfeited. However, Lord Nithsdale made a celebrated escape from the Tower of London by changing clothes with his wife's maid the day before he was due to be executed. The lordship of Herries of Terregles was later restored to his descendants and remains extant.

== Early life ==
William was the only son of Robert Maxwell, fourth Earl of Nithsdale (1627–1683), and Lady Lucy Douglas (d. 1713), daughter of William Douglas, 1st Marquess of Douglas. He was probably born at Terregles Castle, near Dumfries, in 1676. His father died when he was still a child, and he was raised by his mother, the Dowager Countess. She ensured that he was educated in the Roman Catholic faith and remained loyal to the exiled Stuart dynasty.

== Jacobite supporter ==
On reaching the age of 21, in 1697, and becoming earl, William secretly visited the Jacobite court at Saint-Germain to give his allegiance to the exiled King James II and VII, where he met his future wife Lady Winifred Herbert, daughter of the Duke of Powis. After their marriage at Saint-Germain in 1699, they settled at his family seat at Terregles. As a prominent Catholic in the predominantly Covenanting Lowlands, he was on a number of occasions the object of Presbyterian assaults on his estate, on suspicion of harbouring Jesuits.

Despite his discretion, he was long suspected of Jacobite sympathies. In 1712 he resigned his estate to his son William (died 1776), reserving a life rent to himself. In the Jacobite rising of 1715, after some hesitation, he proclaimed James III and VIII at Dumfries and Jedburgh, before joining the main Jacobite forces at Hexham under General Thomas Forster. Nithsdale was captured at Preston together with other Jacobite leaders, sent to London, tried and found guilty of treason, and sentenced to death on 9 February 1716.

His devoted countess Winifred, who was at their home in Terregles (near Dumfries) when she heard of the capture of her husband travelled to London and appealed in vain for a pardon. Instead, she laid a meticulous plan to rescue him from the Tower of London. The night before the day appointed for his execution (24 February 1716), with the help of two other Jacobite ladies, she effected his escape from the Tower. She had been admitted to his room, and by exchanging clothes with his wife's maid, he escaped the attention of his guards. He fled to France, while the countess returned to Scotland to ensure the transfer of the estate to their son. She joined him in Paris and they went to Rome, where they lived, attached to the Government in Exile of Prince James Francis Edward Stuart, heir to the House of Stuart claim to the British and Irish thrones, until his death.

== In literature ==
The story of the Earl of Nithsdale's escape from the Tower of London inspired James Hogg's Ballad of the Lord Maxwell first published in the Royal Lady's Magazine in October 1831.

Peerage of Scotland
Preceded by Robert Maxwell	Earl of Nithsdale; 1696–1716	Attainted
Preceded by Robert Maxwell	Lord Herries of Terregles; 1696–1716	Vacant Attainted Title next held by William Constable-Maxwell
