= Kenneth Mackenzie, 4th Earl of Seaforth =

Scottish peer and Jacobite supporter

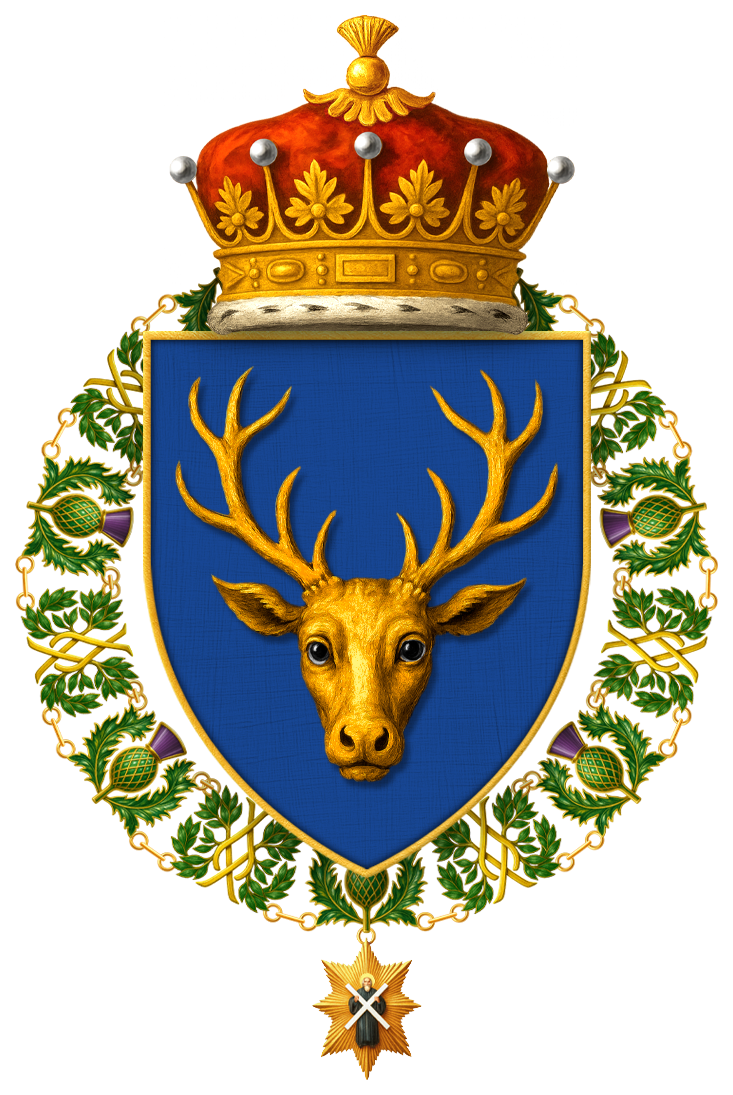
Shield of Arms of Kenneth Mackenzie, 4th Earl of Seaforth, KT, PC (S)

Kenneth Mackenzie, 4th Earl of Seaforth, KT, PC (S) (bapt. 8 December 1661 – January 1701) was a Scottish peer and Jacobite supporter, known as Lord Mackenzie of Kintail from birth until 1678.

== Life ==
Mackenzie was the eldest son of Kenneth Mackenzie, 3rd Earl of Seaforth, and his wife, Isabel. In 1686, he was sworn of the Privy Council of Scotland and was a founding knight of the Order of the Thistle a year later. In 1678, he inherited his father's titles and ten years later, following the Glorious Revolution, he followed King James II and VII to France and later to Ireland, where he was present at the Siege of Derry. For his part in supporting the dethroned King James in Ireland, he was elevated by James in 1690, to Marquess of Seaforth (in the Jacobite Peerage, with the subsidiary title of Earl of Fortrose), and was sent to head a rising in Scotland. He was soon captured and imprisoned. He was released in 1697 and died in Paris in January 1701.

After the battle of Killiecrankie and the death of Claverhouse, James, writing on 30 November 1689 from Dublin Castle to Colonel Cannon, promised to send to him Seaforth to 'head his friends and followers'. For some time Brahan Castle which belonged to him was garrisoned by Hugh Mackay. After General Thomas Buchan undertook the command of the Jacobite forces, Seaforth prepared to join him with a body of the northern clans, but, on learning of Buchan's defeat at Cromdale on 1 May 1690, he sent two of his clan to arrange terms with the government.

He affirmed that he had merely taken up arms for the sake of appearances, and never had any real intention of joining Buchan. He also offered security for his future peaceable behaviour, but Mackay replied that he would be satisfied with no other security than the delivery of his person. Thereupon he agreed to deliver himself up to be confined in Inverness, only stipulating that he should be seized at his seat with a show of force to hide his voluntary submission from the clan. On a party being sent to capture him he, however, changed his mind and disappointed them, pleading that his delicate health would suffer from imprisonment. Thereupon, Mackay resolved to treat his vassals 'with the rigour of military execution;' but, desirous for their sake to avoid extremities, he caused information of his intentions to be sent to Seaforth, who thereupon surrendered himself and was confined in the castle of Inverness. In consequence of a warrant of the privy council, 7 October 1690, he was brought to Edinburgh and imprisoned in the castle. His relative George Mackenzie, viscount Tarbat, first earl of Cromarty, made strong representations to Lord Melville against the impolicy of his imprisonment, but he was retained a prisoner until 7 January 1692, when he was allowed his liberty within ten miles of Edinburgh. On 7 May, he was apprehended at Pencaitland and confined to the castle of Inverness, and was not finally liberated until 1 March 1697. Afterwards he went to France, and died in Paris in January 1701.

== Family ==
Seaforth married Lady Frances Herbert (1659-1732), daughter of William Herbert, 1st Marquess of Powis, in 1680. They had two children:

Name	Birth	Death	Notes
William Mackenzie, 5th Earl of Seaforth	Unknown	8 January 1740	married Mary Kennet; had issue
Lady Mary Sempill	Unknown	1740	married firstly in 1712, John Caryll; had issue married secondly in 1725, Francis Sempill; had issue

Peerage of Scotland
New creation	— TITULAR — Marquess of Seaforth; Jacobite peerage 1690–1701	Succeeded by William Mackenzie
Preceded by Kenneth Mackenzie	Earl of Seaforth; 1678–1701	Succeeded by William Mackenzie
Preceded by Kenneth Mackenzie	Chief of Clan Mackenzie; 1678–1701	Succeeded by William Mackenzie

== Sources ==
- Cracroft's Peerage, Release 6.1
