= Edward Somerset, 2nd Marquess of Worcester =

English nobleman

The Most Honourable The Marquess of Worcester
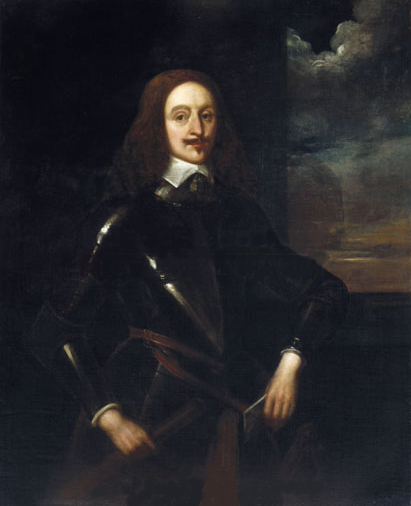
- Portrait by Alexander Craig (1856), after an original by Sir Anthony van Dyck (c. 1640) (oil on canvas)
- Born: 9 March 1602 or 9 March 1603
- Died: 3 April 1667
- Noble family: House of Somerset
- Spouses: Elizabeth Dormer; Margaret O'Brien
- Issue: Henry Somerset, 3rd Marquess of Worcester; Anne Somerset; Elizabeth Somerset; Mary Somerset
- Father: Henry Somerset, 1st Marquess of Worcester
- Mother: Anne Russell

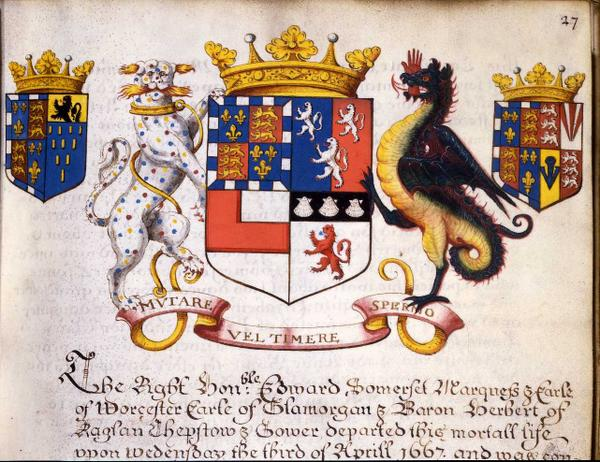
Coat of arms of the Marquess of Worcester

Edward Somerset, 2nd Marquess of Worcester (9 March 1602 or 9 March 1603 – 3 April 1667), styled Lord Herbert of Raglan from 1628 to 1644, was an English Catholic nobleman involved in royalist politics, and an inventor.

While Earl of Glamorgan, he was sent by Charles I to negotiate a peace treaty and alliance with the leadership of the Catholic Irish Confederacy. He enjoyed some success, but the agreement quickly broke down. He then joined the Confederates, and was appointed the commander of their Munster Army.

In 1655 he wrote The Century of Inventions, detailing more than 100 inventions, including a device that would have been one of the earliest steam engines.

== Early life ==
Edward Somerset was the eldest of the nine sons of Henry Somerset, 1st Marquess of Worcester, and his wife Anne Russell, a daughter of John Russell, Baron Russell, eldest son and heir apparent of Francis Russell, 2nd Earl of Bedford. As his father's heir apparent he had the courtesy title of Lord Herbert and was brought up as a Roman Catholic at Raglan Castle and Chepstow Castle in Monmouthshire.

In 1627, Somerset was awarded the University of Cambridge degree of Master of Arts as the son of a nobleman, but no college admission is recorded for him.

== Career ==
Herbert and his father were among the richest lords in England, funding experiments and later military endeavours, and sending large amounts of money to King Charles I.

During the English Civil War, Herbert was a Cavalier who supported the King in Wales, where he raised a regiment of horse for him. His campaigning in the West of England and in Wales, however, did not go well. After a month with his force of over 2,000 troops encamped at Highnam, outside Gloucester, in March 1643 Herbert left them and travelled to meet the king at Oxford. In his absence, the entire force surrendered without any exchange of fire, earning it the title "The Mushroom Army", as it appeared and disappeared very quickly. Herbert was rewarded in 1644, however, with a peerage, being created Earl of Glamorgan and Baron Beaufort of Caldecote, while his father was still alive. Due to irregularities in the letters patent, these peerages were not recognised after the Restoration.

Sent to Ireland, Herbert (now called Glamorgan) made a mistake in concluding a treaty in great secrecy on behalf of King Charles which was considered to concede too much to the Roman Catholics there; he himself was of their religion. In extricating himself from that position, he became a close ally of Giovanni Battista Rinuccini, and a potential replacement for James Butler, 1st Duke of Ormonde, as royalist leader. His plans to bring Irish troops over to England were published in The King's Cabinet Opened after the King's baggage train had been captured at the Battle of Naseby, and Glamorgan was disowned by the King. He left for France with George Leyburn. He inherited his father's peerages and estates on 18 December 1646. He was formally banished in 1649, but after four years in Paris returned to England in 1653. He was discovered, charged with high treason and sent to the Tower of London; he was treated leniently by the Council of State, and released on bail in 1654. That year he took up again his interest in engineering and inventions, leasing a house at Vauxhall where his Dutch or German technician Kaspar Kalthoff could work. After the Restoration his estates were restored, but he largely avoided politics, and did not press his claims to the various other titles of nobility.

== Works ==
In 1655 he authored a book which consisted of textual descriptions of 100 separate inventions. It was eventually printed in 1663 and included a device described as his "Water-commanding Engine". Constructed from the barrel of a cannon, it was an obvious prototype design for what would later become the steam engine, and clearly anticipated the power and applications of that machine.

In 1663 Samuel Sorbière visited Edward's Vauxhall workshop and saw and described the "hydraulic machine which the Marquis of Worcester has invented." It was designed for purposes of irrigation, and would "raise to the height of forty feet, by the strength of one man and in the space of one minute of time, four large buckets of water." Cosimo de' Medici, Duke of Tuscany, visited it in 1669, when a similar description was given. Robert Hooke, however, described it as "one of the perpetual motion fallacies."

Edward suggested that when he died, a model of his engine should be buried with him: "I call this a Semi Omnipotent Engine, and do intend that a model thereof be buried with me."

== Marriage and children ==
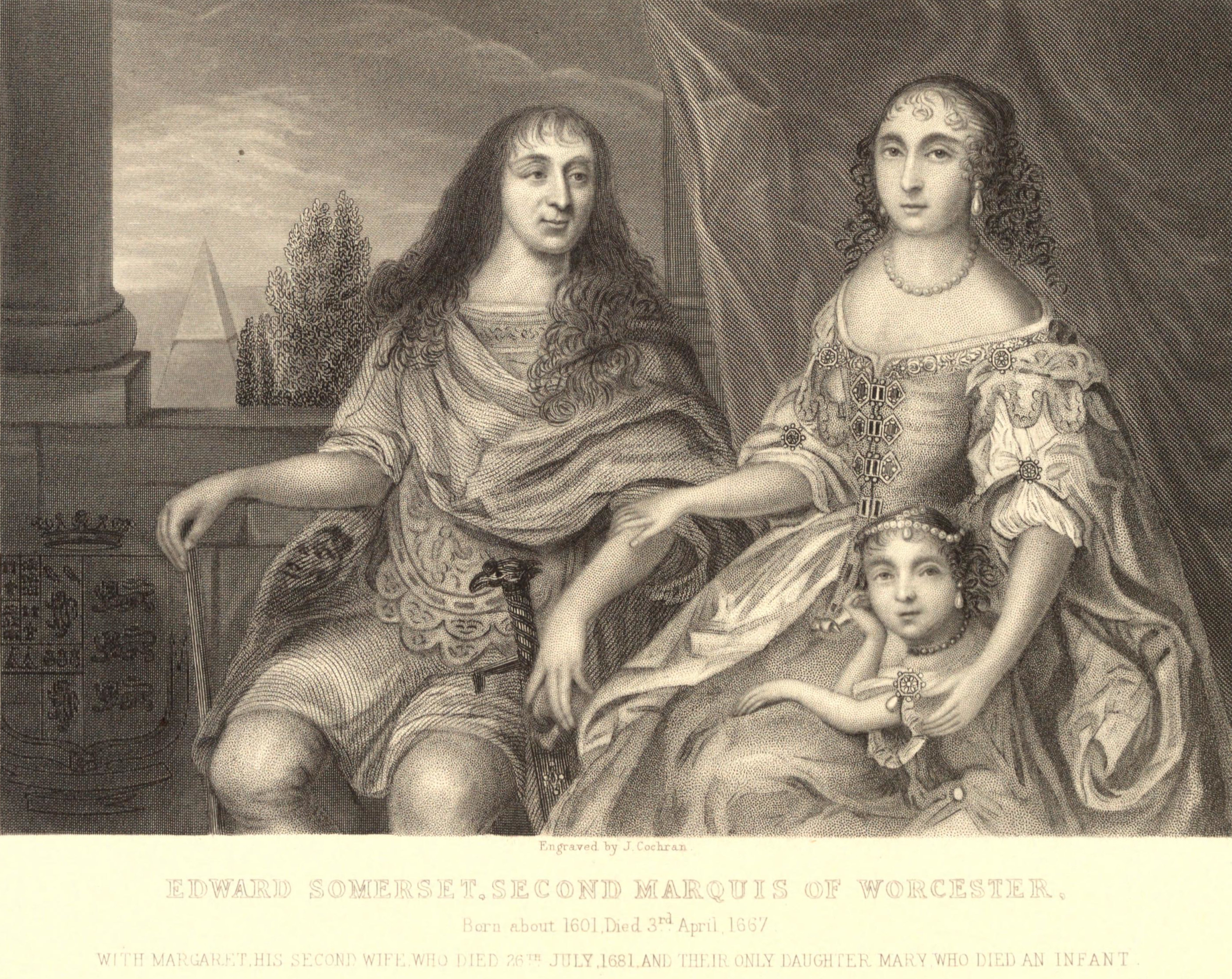
Edward Somerset with Margaret and daughter Mary.

He married twice:

- Firstly in 1628 to Elizabeth Dormer (died 31 May 1635), daughter of Sir William Dormer and Alice Molyneux, and sister of Robert Dormer, 1st Earl of Carnarvon, by whom he had one son and two daughters:
  - Henry Somerset, 1st Duke of Beaufort, 3rd Marquess of Worcester, his heir and successor, who was created Duke of Beaufort;
  - Lady Anne Somerset (c. 1631–1662), who married Henry Howard, 6th Duke of Norfolk, and had issue;
  - Lady Elizabeth Somerset (before 1635 – 1691), who married William Herbert, 1st Marquess of Powis, and had issue.
- Secondly in 1639 he married Lady Margareta O'Brien (died 26 July 1681), daughter of Henry O'Brien, 5th Earl of Thomond and Mary Brereton, by whom he had one daughter:
  - Lady Mary Somerset, died young.

== Burial ==
After his death his widow remarried Donough Kearney, who was charged with treason during the Popish Plot, but acquitted.

Almost 200 years after his death, in 1861, Victorian patent inspector Bennet Woodcroft attempted to locate the grave and the model steam engine which the Marquis stated should be buried with him. Woodcroft hoped, if the model was located, that "Englishmen will be gratified to find that their country has contributed even more than was supposed to the advancement of civilisation".

Woodcroft sought permission from the then Duke of Beaufort (successor to the Marquis) to examine remains in the Somerset crypt within St Cadoc's Church, Raglan, in search of the model, and the Duke granted permission on the basis that Woodcroft also obtained ecclesiastical permission.

Archive documents indicate ecclesiastical permission was not obtained, yet Woodcroft and a party locked themselves inside the church on 4 January 1861, and opened the crypt. They found 7 coffins, as documented when the crypt had previously been opened.

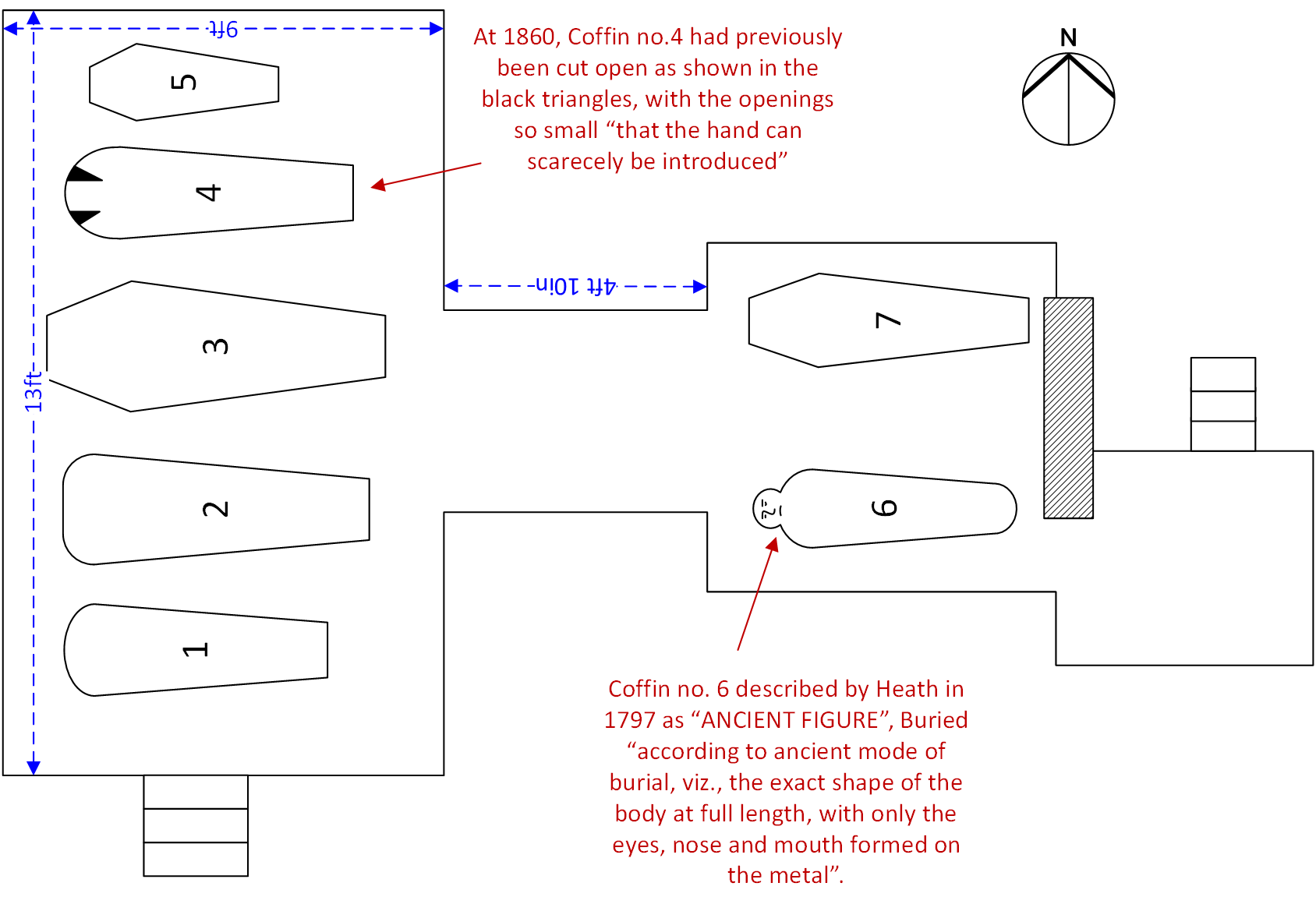
Transcription of Wyatt's dimensioned survey of 1860 (North Up)

They opened coffin 7, which had an inscription indicating this was the Marquis' coffin, their report stating:

... the lead on the outside was dry and well preserved, and when a part of it had been cut and rolled back some holes were made with the bit and brace in the elm wood cover, which allowed a few smart blows with the chisel to take out a small piece of wood.

The foot of the coffin was opened and the 6 or 7 layers of "strong linen" were cut open to reveal "two legs inside with skin very white and not very much shrunken". Outside the linen, they found matter "exactly like the slush in an Irish bog and emitting a strong but not pungent or disagreeable odour". The head of the coffin was then opened, although "out of respect for the remains of the mighty dead we did not open the cloth over the face".

They then moved their attention to coffin 3, which had a plaque resting (but not fixed) on it identifying it as Lady Granville's coffin, in the hope that the model could be found there. "The lead was therefore cut and folded back and underneath there was found a carefully placed ceiling of beautifully glass-like green wax which seemed quite untouched by decay." They then cut out a section of wood and saw "that the two breasts of a female lying in state confirmed the supposition that the plate [identifying this as Lady Granville's coffin] was correctly placed on this coffin". The party then cut open the head covering and "the mouth was soon disclosed and five or six long and rather misshapen teeth appeared. The lower jaw was much separated from the other and I raised it in order to search carefully below for any necklace or other ornament which might be buried there". The model was not located in this coffin. This last action, searching for a "necklace or other ornament", is when the expedition shifted from a legally dubious search for a model steam engine, to a clearly illegal desecration of human remains, as having identified this coffin contained a female body and no model, there was no legitimate reason to investigate further.

They then returned to coffin 7, with their report stating:

... making a long cut through the stiff close shroud and inserting the axe point in the edge we lifted up the naked body of the renowned Marquis of Worcester. The hands were crossed over the lower part of the stomach, the right hand being uppermost and bound to the other with a lanyard of yarn rope. The skin and flesh were soft and a little shrunken and the nails were long, beautifully shaped and perfectly preserved. There was a good deal of reddish hair on the body. No sign of any substance metal wood or other hard matter being in the coffin could be observed. I was determined to make a thorough search when I was about it and therefore sending for a large screwdriver which was nearly two feet long I probed carefully round the whole body at intervals of about an inch to see if under any part or concealed by the dark mud like matter there might haply be any small metallic ring to indicate the model we were in search of.

Having failed to find the model in either coffin, they closed the coffins "as well as we could arrange them, and stopped till the great stone was placed on the vault and the loose earth above was filled in".

== Ancestry ==
Ancestors of Edward Somerset, 2nd Marquess of Worcester

8. William Somerset, 3rd Earl of Worcester
4. Edward Somerset, 4th Earl of Worcester
9. Christian North
2. Henry Somerset, 1st Marquess of Worcester
10. Francis Hastings, 2nd Earl of Huntingdon
5. Elizabeth Hastings
11. Catherine Pole
1. Edward Somerset, 2nd Marquess of Worcester
12. Francis Russell, 2nd Earl of Bedford
6. John Russell, 3rd Baron Russell
13. Margaret St John
3. Anne Russell
14. Anthony Cooke
7. Elizabeth Cooke
15. Anne Fitzwilliam

== Notes ==
Peerage of England
Preceded by Henry Somerset	Marquess of Worcester; 1646–1667	Succeeded by Henry Somerset
