= Buncton =

Village in West Sussex, England

Coordinates: 50.91332°N 0.37259°W

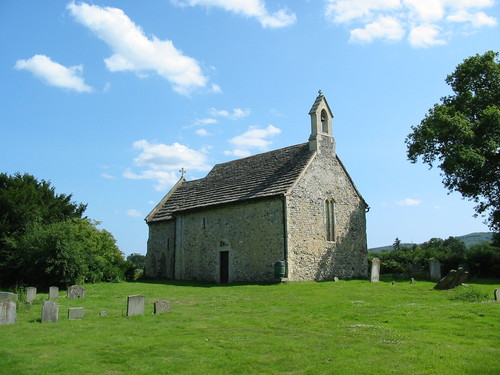
- All Saints Church at Buncton dates from the 11th or 12th century

- Location within West Sussex
- OS grid reference: TQ145139
- Civil parish: Wiston
- District: Horsham
- Shire county: West Sussex
- Region: South East
- Country: England
- Sovereign state: United Kingdom
- Post town: STEYNING
- Postcode district: BN44
- Police: Sussex
- Fire: West Sussex
- Ambulance: South East Coast
- UK Parliament: Arundel and South Downs

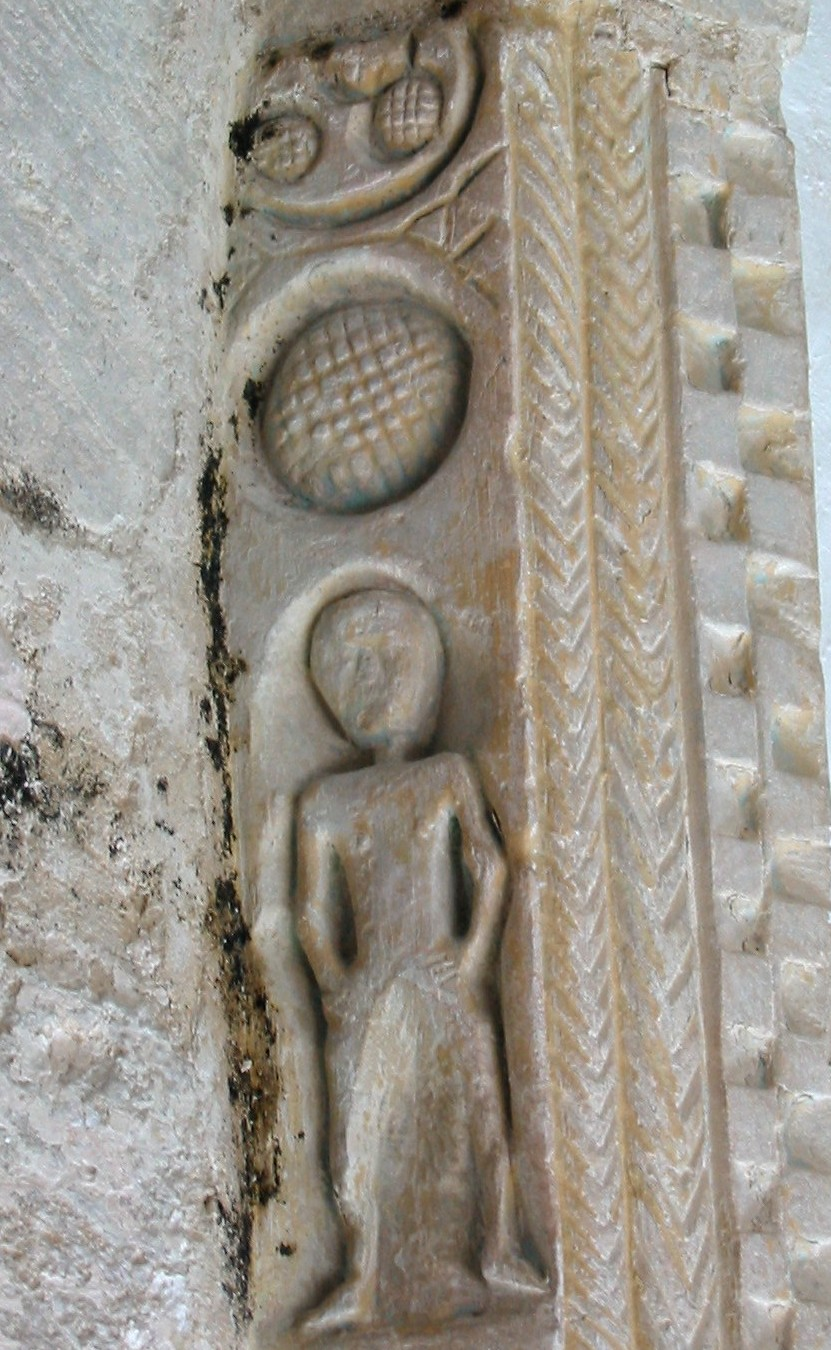
The church carving which was destroyed in 2004.

Buncton (/ˈbʌntən, ˈbʌŋktən/) is a small village in the Horsham District of West Sussex, England, part of the civil parish of Wiston 0.5 miles (0.80 km) north. It lies to the east of the A24 road, 11 miles (18 km) as the crow flies, about 18 miles (29 km) by road south of Horsham and 6 miles (9.7 km) north west of Shoreham by Sea.

Buncton existed as a settlement at the time of the Domesday survey in 1086, when it was called Bongetune. Its origins lie in a manor whose land lay within two exclaves of the parish of Ashington within the Rape of Bramber, one of the six ancient subdivisions of Sussex. The medieval manor house has vanished, but a 17th-century replacement still stands.

The most notable building in Buncton is All Saints Church, a grade I listed building. This 11th or 12th century structure is composed mainly of flint and rubble masonry with some fragments of tile salvaged from the earlier Roman building that existed nearby. The church was built by the monks of neighbouring Sele Priory, and parts of the stonework show evidence of having been previously used at Sele. The church contained a curious carving, claimed by some to be an example of a sheela-na-gig, which was destroyed by an act of vandalism in 2004.

Until 2007 All Saints' was a district chapel of ease, subordinate to St Mary's Church at Wiston, but in that year the status of the two buildings was reversed, with All Saints' becoming the Parish Church.
