= Chapel of ease =

Church building other than the parish church

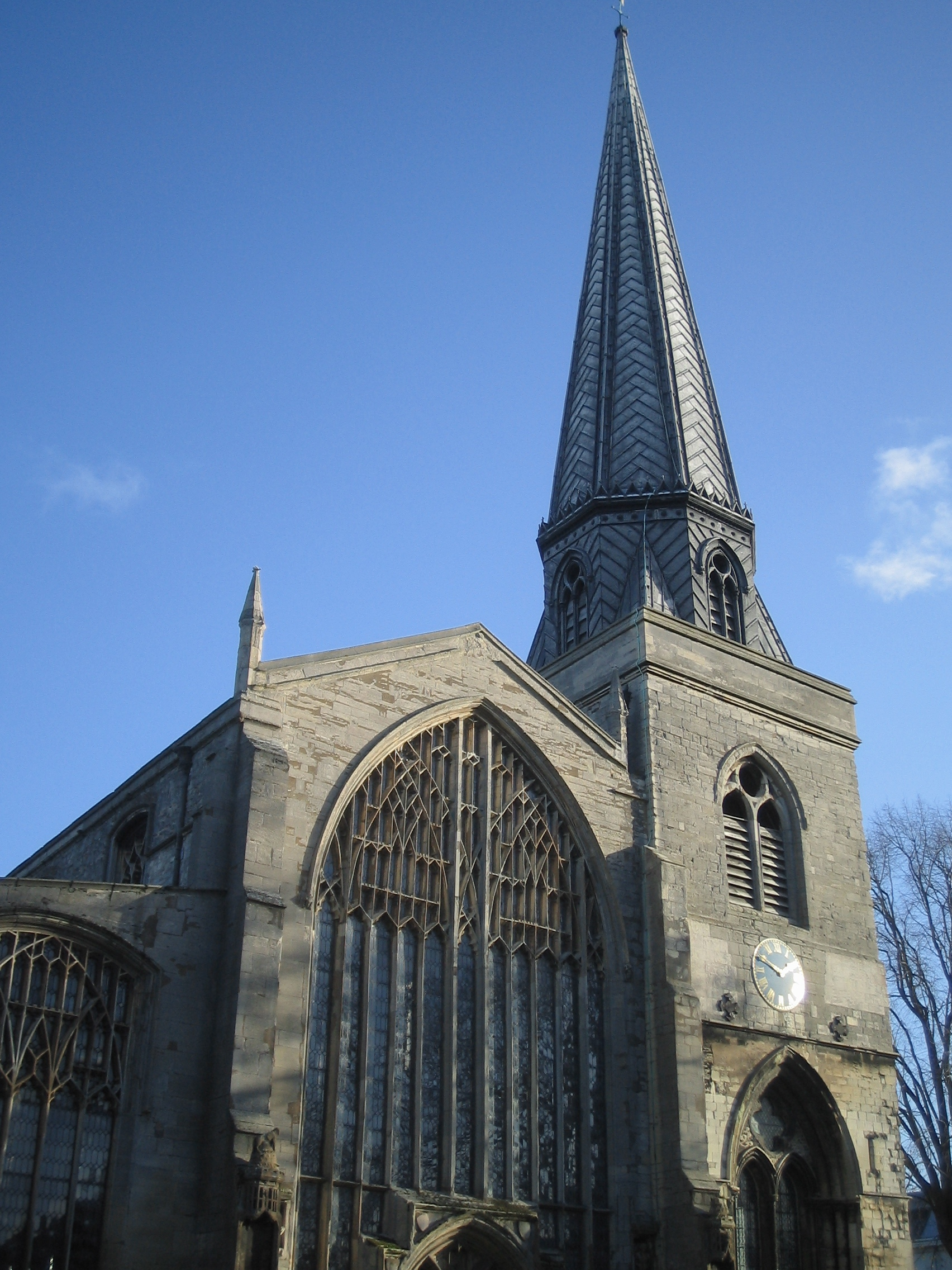
St Nicholas' Chapel in King's Lynn, England's largest chapel of ease

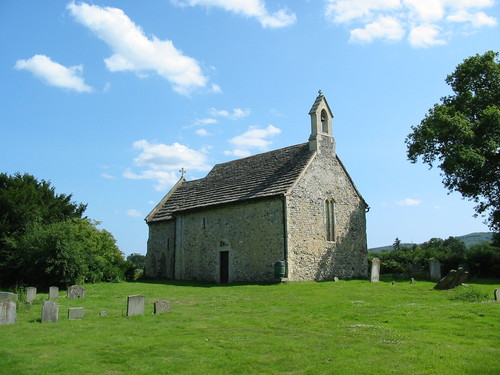
All Saints' Church at Buncton in West Sussex dates from the 11th or 12th century.

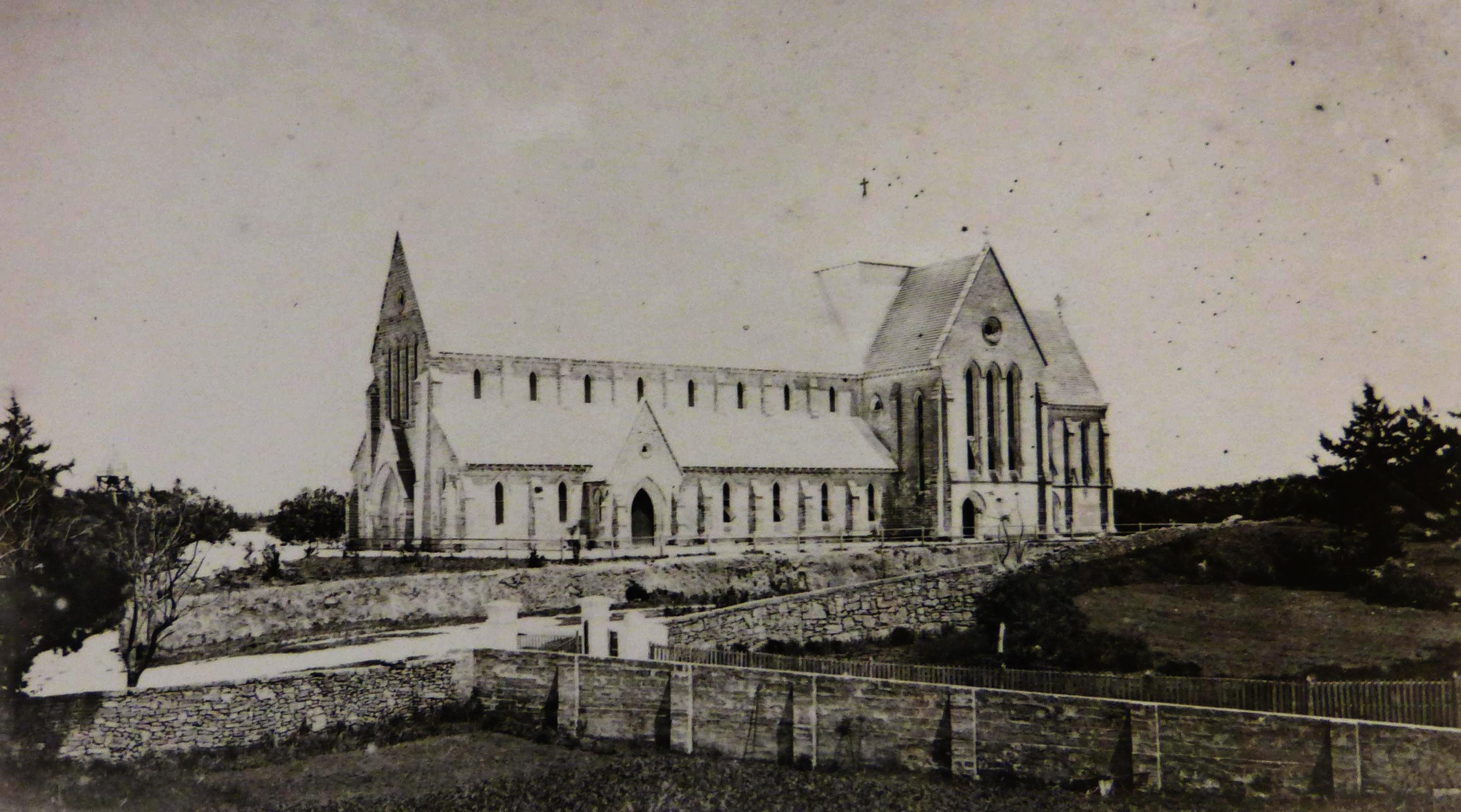
Trinity Church in 1879, the chapel-of-ease in the City of Hamilton, Bermuda, for the then-Bishop of Newfoundland and Bermuda (the Cathedral of St. John the Baptist was at St. John's, Newfoundland).

A chapel of ease (or chapel-of-ease) is a church building other than the parish church, built within the bounds of a parish for the attendance of those who cannot reach the parish church conveniently, generally due to travel distance.

Often, a chapel of ease is deliberately built as such, being more accessible to some parishioners than the main church. Such a chapel may exist, for example, when a parish covers several dispersed villages, or a central village together with its satellite hamlet or hamlets. In such a case the parish church will be in the main settlement, with one or more chapels of ease in the subordinate village(s) and/or hamlet(s). An example is the chapel belonging to All Hallows' Parish in Maryland, United States. The chapel was built in Davidsonville from 1860 to 1865 because the parish's "Brick Church" in South River was 5 miles (8 km) distance which took 90 minutes to walk each way. A more extreme example is the Chapel-of-Ease built in 1818 on St. David's Island in Bermuda to spare St. David's Islanders crossing St. George's Harbour to reach the parish church, St. Peter's, on St. George's Island.

Some chapels of ease are buildings which used to be the main parish church until a larger building was constructed for that purpose. For example, the small village of Norton, Hertfordshire, contains the mediaeval church of St Nicholas, which served it adequately for centuries, but when the garden city Letchworth was built, partly within the parish, St Nicholas's became too small to serve the increased population. This led to the building of a new main church for the parish, and St Nicholas's became a chapel of ease.

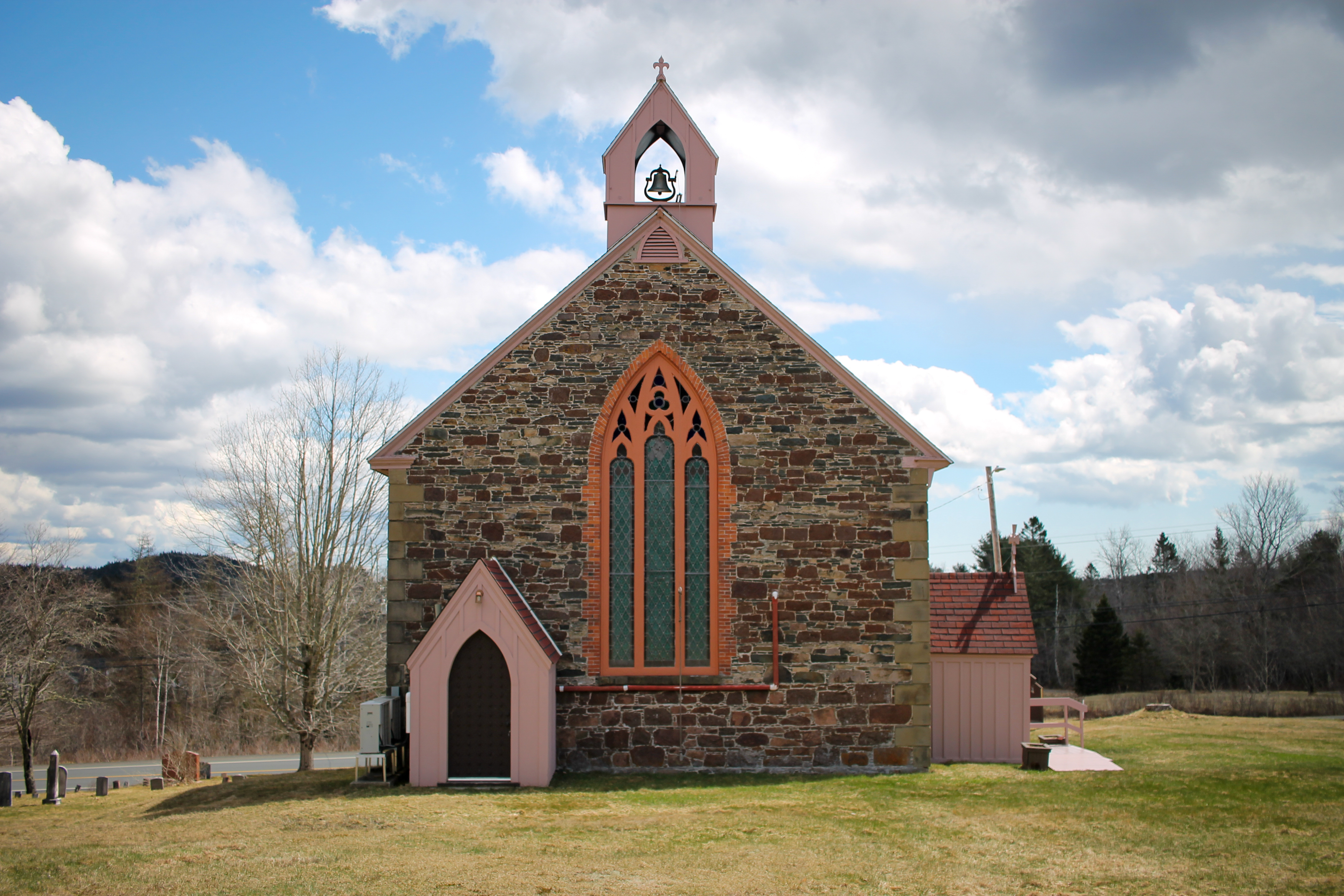
St. John the Baptist Chapel of Ease in Chamcook, New Brunswick

Chapels of ease are sometimes associated with large manor houses, where they provide a convenient place of worship for the family of the manor, and for the domestic and rural staff of the house and the estate. There are many such chapels in England, for example that at Pedlinge in Kent. An example in the New World is Saint John's Chapel of Ease in Chamcook, New Brunswick, Canada, which was built in the 1840s to support a gentleman's house and the small nearby settlement of shipbuilders, farmers, and a grist-mill.

Sometimes an ancient parish church is reduced in status to a chapel of ease due to a shift of population. The churches of St Mary Wiston and All Saints' at Buncton in West Sussex are an example of this. For centuries St Mary's was the parish church, located near to Wiston House and therefore the centre of population, whilst All Saints' served the nearby hamlet of Buncton, as a chapel of ease. Today, however, the resident population of Wiston is tiny, whilst Buncton has grown, so that in 2007 the status of the buildings was reversed, with All Saints' becoming the parish church, and St Mary's reduced to a chapel of ease.

When two or more existing parishes are combined into a single parish, one or more of the old church buildings may be kept as a chapel of ease. For example, the six Roman Catholic parishes in Palo Alto, California, were combined into a single parish, St. Thomas Aquinas Parish, in 1987. Since then, St. Thomas Aquinas Church serves as the parish church, with Our Lady of the Rosary Church and St. Albert the Great Church as chapels of ease.

When a parish is split because of expanding population a chapel of ease may be promoted to a full parish church. An example of this is St. Margaret's Church, Rochester in Kent which started as a chapel of ease for the parish of St Nicholas in 1108, became a parish church in 1488, then reverted to a chapel of ease when the parish was recombined with St Peter's in 1953.

== See also ==
- Chapelry
- Filial church
- Pilgrimage church
