= All Saints Church, Buncton =

All Saints Church
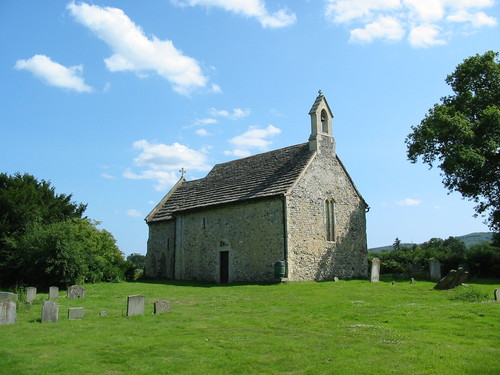
- The church from the northwest
- All Saints Church
- 50.9133°N 0.3726°W
- Location: Water Lane, Buncton, West Sussex BN44 3DD
- Country: England
- Denomination: Church of England

History
- Status: Parish church
- Founded: Late 11th century
- Founder: Monks of Sele Priory (attr.)
- Dedication: All Saints
- Dedicated: By 1873

Architecture
- Functional status: Active
- Heritage designation: Grade I
- Designated: 15 March 1955
- Style: Norman
- Groundbreaking: Late 11th century

Administration
- Province: Canterbury
- Diocese: Chichester
- Archdeaconry: Horsham
- Deanery: Rural Deanery of Storrington
- Parish: Wiston with Buncton

All Saints Church is an Anglican church in the hamlet of Buncton in the district of Horsham, one of seven local government districts in the English county of West Sussex. Built in the 11th or 12th century as a small chapel of ease to a nearby parish church, and hardly changed or restored since, the stone chapel stands behind a "delightful ... wooded ravine" beneath the South Downs and has been called "a real piece of hidden Sussex". The chancel arch, between the nave and chancel which made up the simple two-room building, had a bizarre 12th-century carving of a person of indeterminate sex exposing their genitalia—until 2004, when an unknown vandal destroyed it with a chisel. The church is still used for Christian worship, and English Heritage has listed it at Grade I for its architectural and historical importance. The church is also known as Buncton Chapel.

== History ==
Buncton existed as a settlement at the time of the Domesday survey in 1086, when it was called Bongetune. Its origins lie in a manor whose land lay within two exclaves of the parish of Ashington within the Rape of Bramber, one of the six ancient subdivisions of Sussex. The medieval manor house has vanished, but a 17th-century replacement still stands.

The settlement's church was built on a rural site, considered a "picturesque setting", at an unknown date during the Norman period. Most sources date its construction to the late 11th or early 12th century; others offer no more confident attribution than 12th-century, "1066 to 1200" or "mostly Norman". An article published in volume 38 of the Sussex Archaeological Collections (1892) dated it to 1150–1180 and attributed its construction to the monks of Sele Priory at nearby Beeding, although a wide-ranging study of Sussex church architecture 15 years later suggested a date of c. 1070 for the nave and chancel arch—partly based on the lack of buttresses. This date would make the church a Saxon–Norman transitional building.

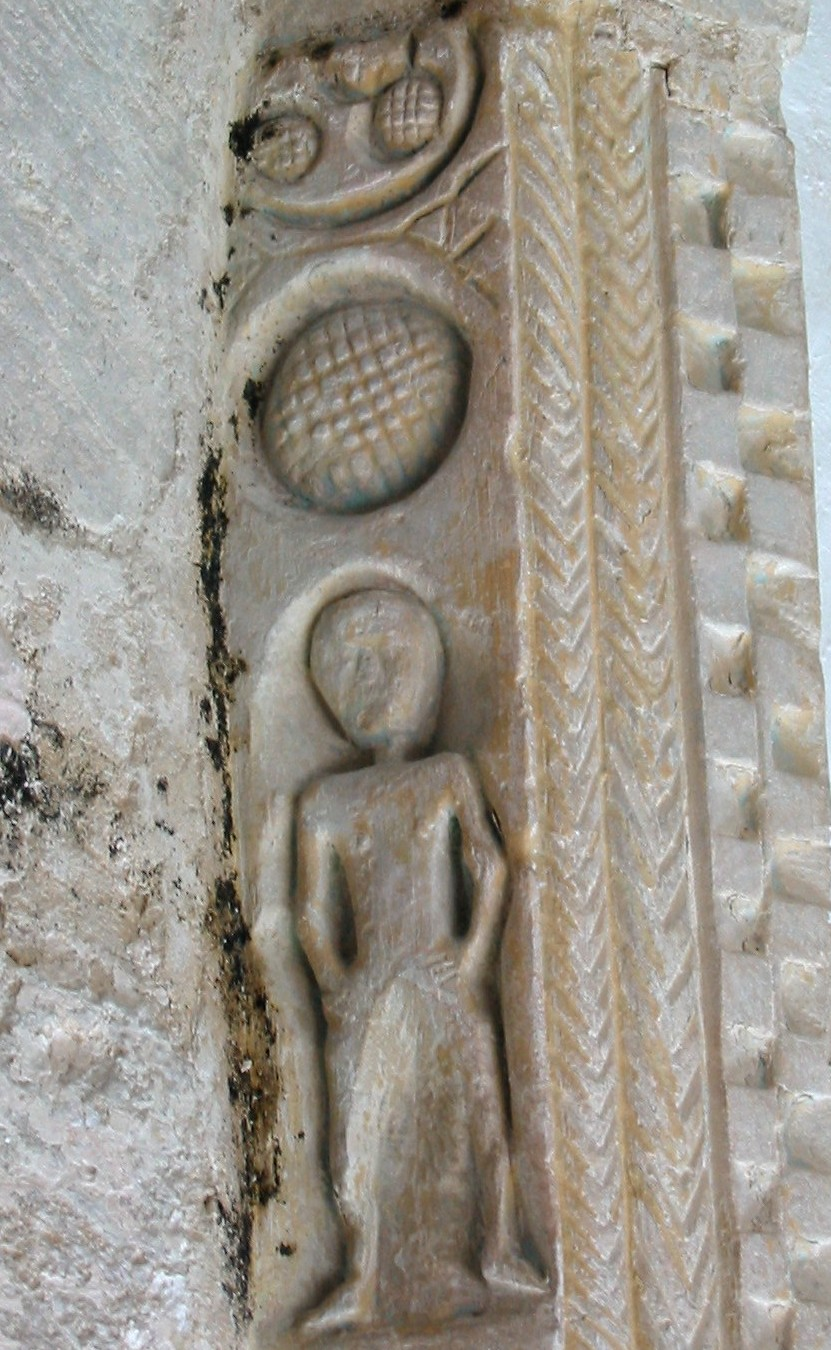
The mysterious carving on the chancel arch, pictured shortly before its destruction in 2004

The church had a chancel with a squared-off east end and a nave with no aisles, with a chancel arch between them. This "two-cell" style was characteristic of small Sussex churches of the 11th and 12th centuries, especially those around the South Downs. The walls of both parts are quite high, and have been called "too tall for so small a church". Some rubble and tiles from a nearby Roman building were used in its construction; an east–west Roman road, the Sussex Greensand Way, on the lower part of the Greensand Ridge passed close to the chapel, and a large villa stood about 1/2 mile (0.8 km) away, near the original Buncton manor house. (The villa's hypocaust was discovered in 1848.)

The chancel was altered in the 13th century, and the east end was further changed a century later. It was shortened, the east wall was rebuilt with square masonry blocks, and a Decorated Gothic window was inserted. The church also gained an aumbry and a piscina at this time, and some richly decorative Norman-era masonry arches were inserted in the exterior walls on the north and south sides. They came from another building—possibly Sele Priory—at some point between the 14th century and the Reformation. The only significant structural alteration was a 19th-century bellcote; compared to many ancient churches in Sussex, the church remains "delightfully unrestored". Some modest renovation was also carried out in 1906. Ancient churches which have survived intact or with minimal alteration often indicate a moribund local economy and loss of local population: local worshippers neither needed nor could afford to update their church.

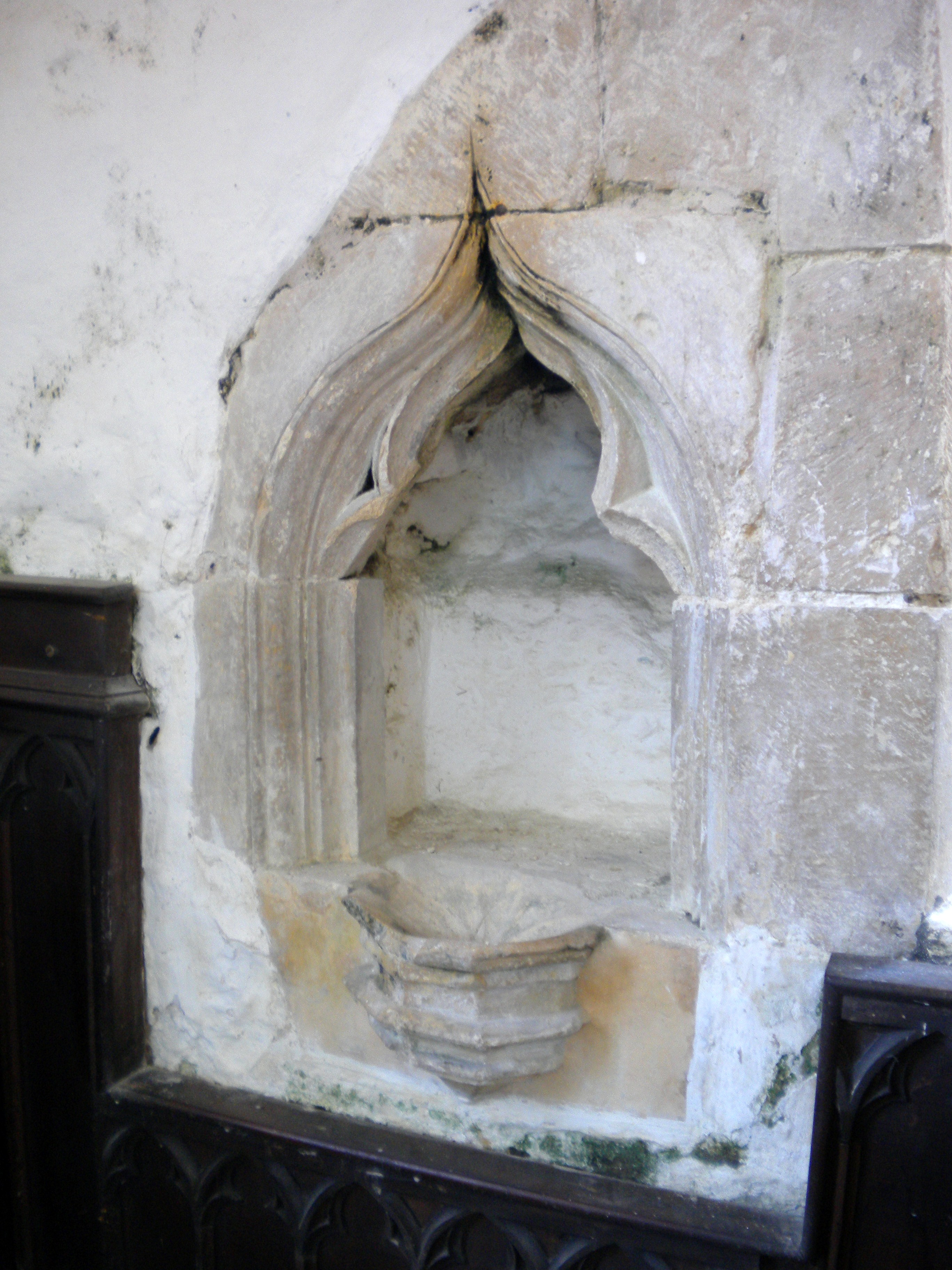
The 14th-century piscina

There have been many changes in the parochial arrangements of the church, and for most of its existence it has been a subordinate church within a larger parish. It was recorded as a parish church in 1323, and its rectors occasionally administered the church at nearby Wiston. In the 15th century, though, All Saints lost its parish status as it was linked with St Peter and St Paul's Church in neighbouring Ashington. Thereafter it served as a chapel of ease to that church. (Ashington had been split from the parish of nearby Washington in about the 12th century.) By 1535, the parish and benefice name was Ashington with Buncton. In 1977, Ashington with Buncton and Washington with Wiston parishes were united into a single large benefice; this legal entity still exists, but by the end of the 20th century All Saints was in the parish of St Mary's Church in Wiston. St Mary's was declared redundant by the Diocese of Chichester at the end of 2009.

The north impost of the chancel arch had a strange carved stone figure dating from the 12th century. Although it is common for Norman churches to have carved or painted representations of human faces or figures, Buncton's was a very unusual example: an 8-inch (20 cm) sculpture of a person of indeterminate sex showing its genitals. It was similar to a Sheela na gig—typically a smiling naked woman with exposed genitalia, common in churches in the Republic of Ireland but rarely seen elsewhere, and reputedly associated with pagan sites, Celtic fertility rites or medieval anti-immorality teaching. About 30 such carvings exist in Britain. In December 2004, an unknown person entered the church and destroyed the carving with a chisel, smashing it into dozens of pieces.

== Architecture ==
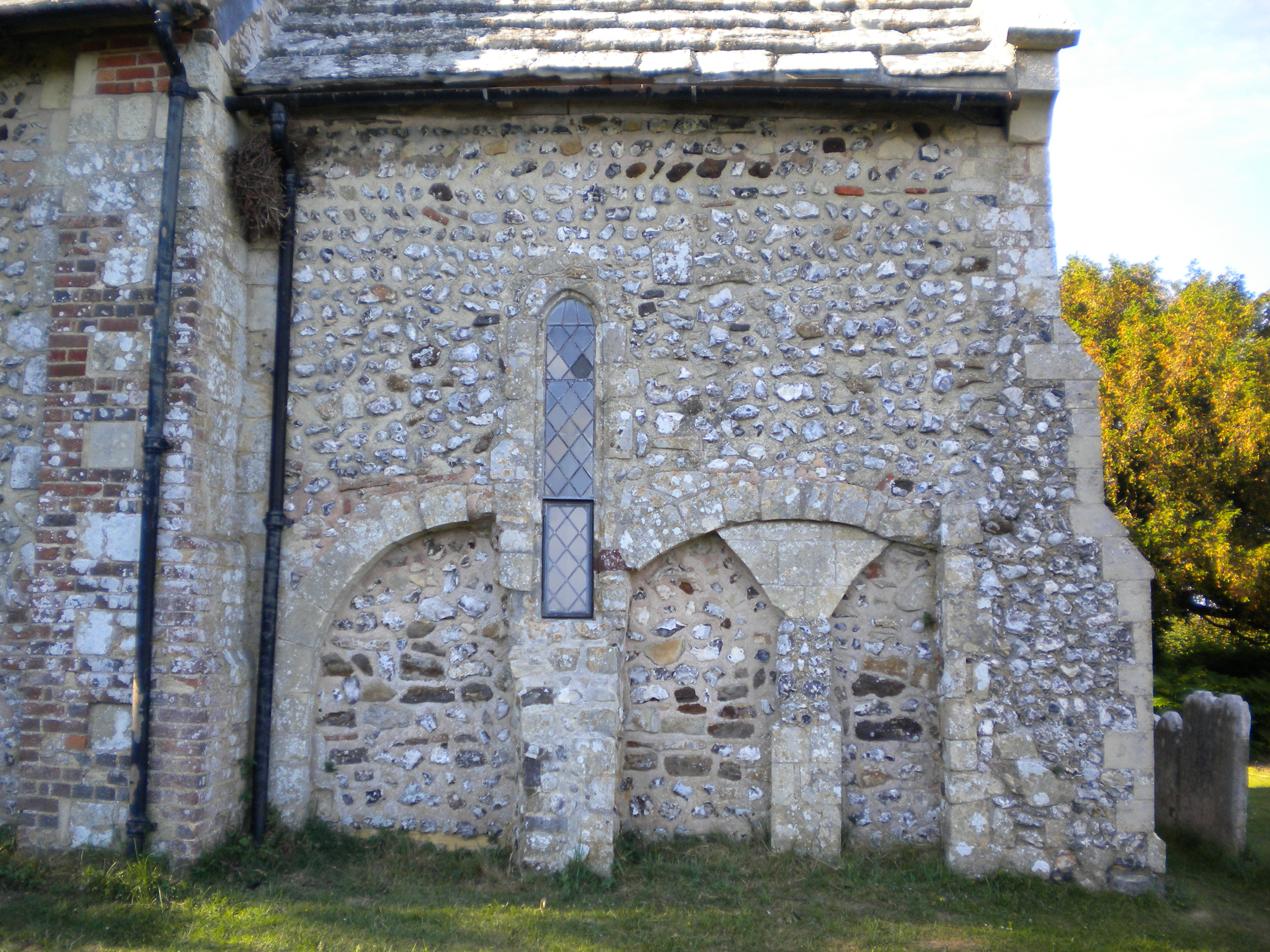
Decorative blocked arches on the chancel wall

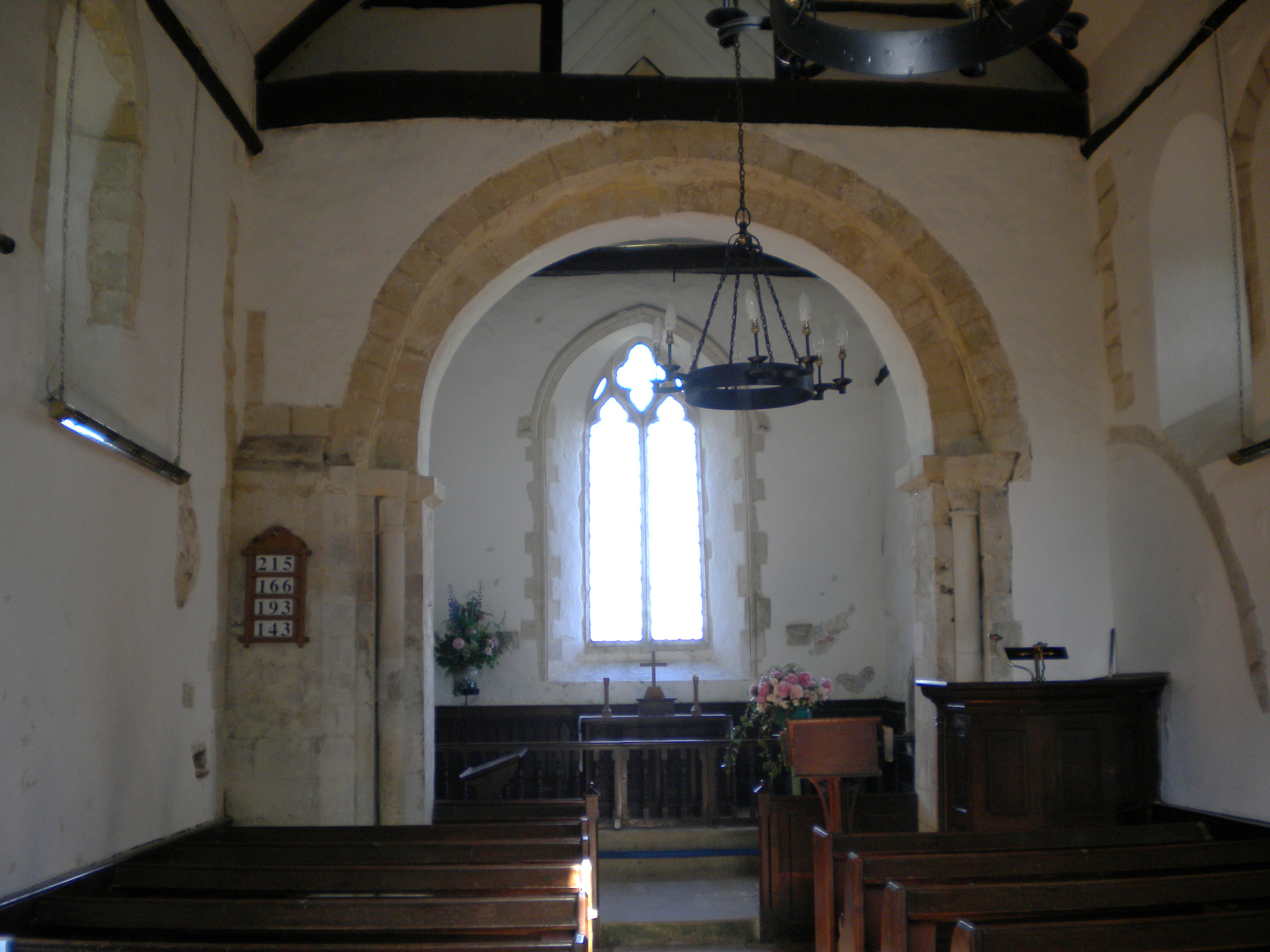
The chancel arch, looking towards the Decorated Gothic east window

All Saints Church is a small, simple building with a tall, narrow profile. It is built mostly of flint, in common with many Sussex downland churches; some stone rubble and masonry is also visible, and recycled Roman tiles can be seen. It has been described as being "a little like a stone barn", and its isolation is enhanced by its position in the middle of a field reached through a tree-lined hollow.

The outside of the north wall of the chancel incorporates a pair of Romanesque-style Norman-era blocked arches, described as "extraordinary" by Nikolaus Pevsner (who dated them to c. 1160). One has beakhead shapes, while the other is made up of intersecting arches and has elaborate decoration and mouldings, with some use of ashlar. The arches serve no apparent structural purpose; their insertion, in the 14th century, was merely decorative.

The chancel measures 14.5 by 20 feet (4.4 m × 6.1 m): these unusually short proportions are evidence of the work carried out in the 14th century to cut its length back. It is lower than the nave, which has original Norman doorways in its north and south walls. The latter is now blocked, and has a crude stone lintel with the remains of a segmental arch above. The doorway in the north wall survives in good condition, and is flat-arched with voussoirs and wedge-shaped springers. Three original windows survive in the nave; all are placed very high on the walls. The chancel's lancet windows, in contrast, were inserted in the 13th century or later. Its larger east window is in the Decorated Gothic style and dates from the 14th century.

The chancel arch is large and contemporary with the nave. Square plinths with decorative moulding support shafts with unusual capitals which have abaci with such extensive chamfering that they are almost circular. The imposts are carved with a series of characteristic Norman designs such as squares and herringbone patterns— although the mysterious carved figure with exposed genitals no longer exists. Paintings on the adjacent wall of the nave have mostly been lost as well. The maximum height of the chancel arch is 14.8 feet (4.5 m).

Interior fittings include a piscina inserted in the 14th century. Pevsner observed that it "manages to get a lot of character into tiny dimensions".

== The church today ==
All Saints Church was listed at Grade I by English Heritage on 15 March 1955. Such buildings are defined as being of "exceptional interest" and greater than national importance. As of February 2001, it was one of 38 Grade I listed buildings, and 1,726 listed buildings of all grades, in the district of Horsham.

Services at the church have rarely been more frequent than monthly in recent centuries. This frequency was recorded in 1724 and the early 19th century; for part of that century no services were held in winter, and worshippers travelled to Ashington instead. Weekly worship took place for a time later in that century, but in modern times services have reverted to monthly, with a Eucharistic service on the third Sunday of the month.

The parish, whose legal name is Wiston with Buncton, covers those two villages at the foot of the South Downs and a large rural area between the A24 and A283 roads. It is one of two parishes in the wider benefice of Ashington, Washington and Wiston with Buncton.

== See also ==
- List of places of worship in Horsham (district)
