= Warminghurst =

Village in West Sussex, England

Coordinates: 50.94025°N 0.41178°W

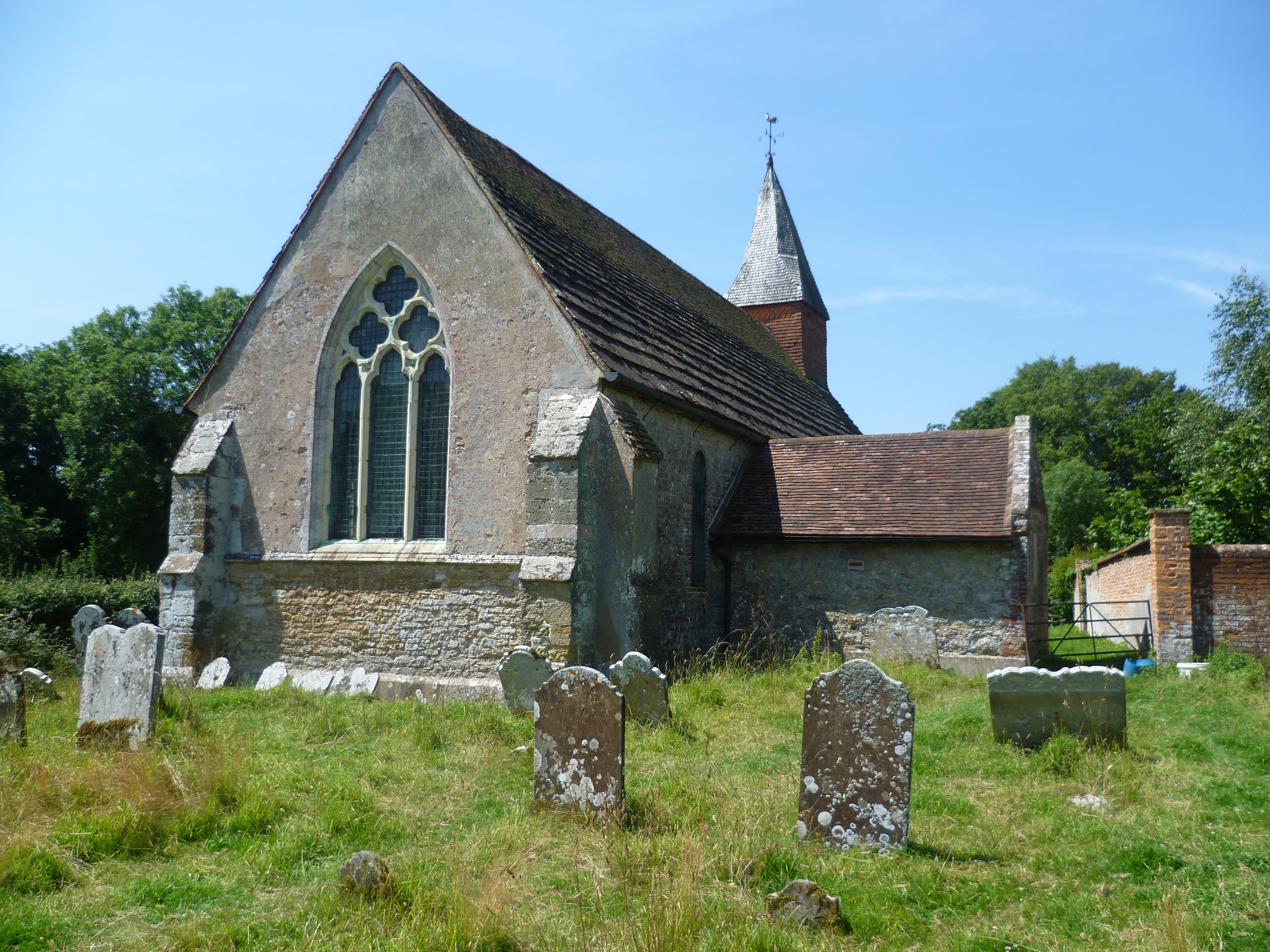

- Location within West Sussex
- OS grid reference: TQ116168
- Civil parish: Thakeham
- District: Horsham
- Shire county: West Sussex
- Region: South East
- Country: England
- Sovereign state: United Kingdom
- Post town: PULBOROUGH
- Postcode district: RH20
- Police: Sussex
- Fire: West Sussex
- Ambulance: South East Coast
- UK Parliament: Arundel and South Downs

Warminghurst is a village and former civil parish, now in the parish of Thakeham, in the Horsham district of West Sussex, England. It lies on the Ashington to Heath Common road 2.4 miles (3.9 km) northeast of Storrington. In 1931 the parish had a population of 93. On 1 April 1933 the parish was abolished and merged with Ashington.

The Church of the Holy Sepulchre, Warminghurst's Anglican church, was declared redundant in 1979. The Grade I-listed 13th-century building is now cared for by the Churches Conservation Trust.

In 1676 Henry Bigland sold Warminghurst Manor to William Penn. Using this house, the Penn family were able to hold secret monthly meetings for Quakers from the local Horsham district and when Penn left England in 1682 for his first visit to America, he had many of these local Quakers join him. In 1702 he sold the house to James Butler who had it demolished and then erected another on the site, which was then subsequently sold to the Duke of Norfolk in 1805. The large barn and farm buildings which survive today behind Park Lane likely do not date from Penn's house but from the early 18th century mansion of James Butler.

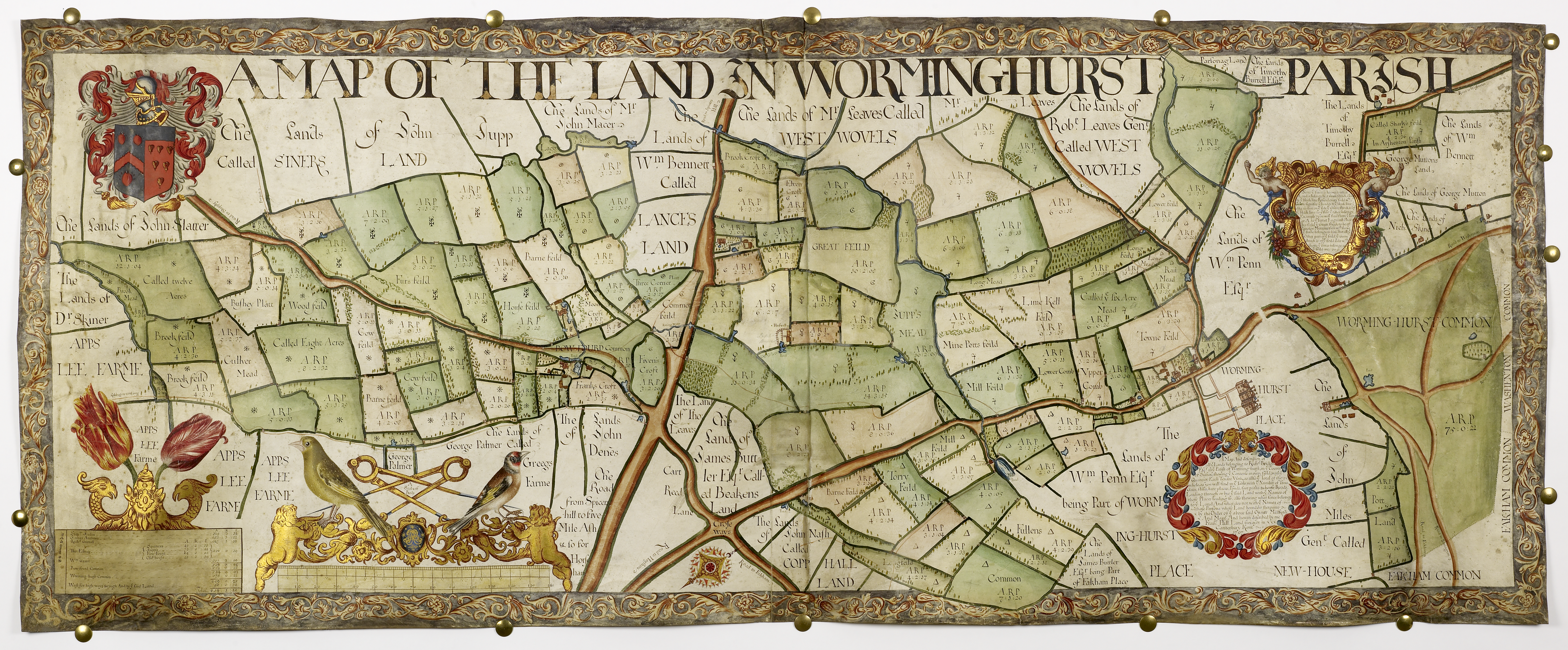
Map of Warminghurst Parish, c. 1707
