= Church of the Holy Sepulchre, Warminghurst =

Church in West Sussex, England

Church of the Holy Sepulchre
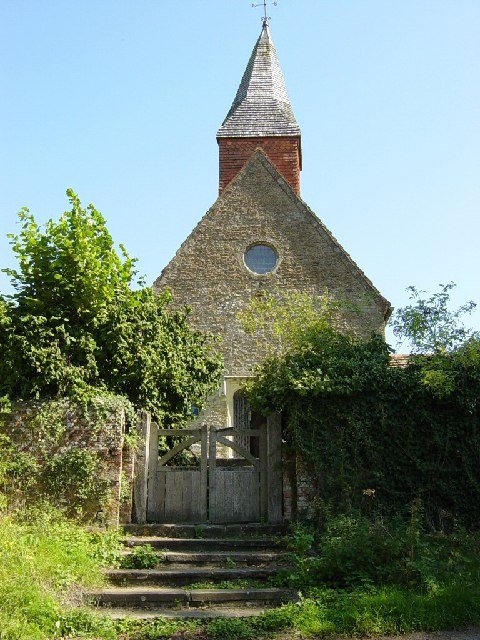
- The former church from the east

- Location of the church within West Sussex
- 50.9403°N 0.4114°W
- Location: Park Lane, Warminghurst, Ashington, West Sussex RH20 3AW
- Country: England
- Denomination: Anglican

History
- Founded: By late 12th century
- Dedication: Holy Sepulchre
- Dedicated: By 13th century

Architecture
- Functional status: Redundant
- Heritage designation: Grade I
- Designated: 15 March 1955
- Style: Early English Gothic
- Closed: 1 April 1979

Administration
- Diocese: Chichester
- Archdeaconry: Horsham
- Deanery: Storrington
- Parish: Thakeham with Warminghurst

The Church of the Holy Sepulchre is a former Anglican church in the hamlet of Warminghurst in the district of Horsham, one of seven local government districts in the English county of West Sussex. The present building, which is no longer used for worship, has 13th-century origins, but a church may have existed on the site in the 11th century or earlier. Often administered in connection with other churches in the rural area of West Sussex in which it was built–churches at nearby Steyning, Ashington and Thakeham were all involved with it at various times–its congregations declined and closure came first in the 1920s and then for good in 1979, when it was declared redundant. Unlike many ancient churches in Sussex, it was not subject to restoration in the mid-19th century: its interior has been called "the finest example in Sussex of how many must have looked before the Victorian restorers". After a period in which the Early English Gothic stone-built church fell into dereliction, prompting one Sussex historian to lament its "unloved" appearance, it was taken into the care of the Churches Conservation Trust. English Heritage has listed the church at Grade I for its architectural and historical importance.

== History ==
Warminghurst (from Old English meaning "the high wood of Wyrma's people") is an ancient parish at the south of the Weald, close to where the South Downs rise. It is long from north and south, narrow and largely rural; its village, never very large, has disappeared since the medieval era. Development was always scattered rather than nucleated because the land around the church and manor house sloped steeply away on all sides.

One of the earliest descriptions of Warminghurst was as an appurtenance of Steyning, a more significant nearby town, and although the Domesday survey of 1086 mentioned two churches in the latter, one may have been at Warminghurst. A church is known to have stood in the parish by the late 12th century, when the name of the village was Werningcherch.

The present church, a simple sandstone building, was built at the end of a lane a short distance from the church in neighbouring Thakeham in about 1220. Early in its history it was, like its mother church at Steyning, owned by the Benedictine abbey at Fécamp in Normandy, to which tithes were payable. A connection with Steyning was maintained until the early 17th century, when the Church of the Holy Sepulchre became independent. Structurally, the church changed little from its early 13th-century appearance: a long single room with no division (in the form of a chancel arch) between the chancel and nave and an unbroken roofline over them, lit by lancet windows on each side and an oculus above the entrance. Above the west end, the wood and shingled bell-turret is the oldest part of the building: its timbers have been dated to c. 1158. The bell it houses, cast in about 1200, is one of the oldest survivors in Sussex.

The three-light east window, containing plain glass and with quatrefoils at the top, dates from the 14th century (possibly as early as 1300) and is in the Decorated Gothic style. In the absence of any structural division between the chancel and the nave, a large wooden screen was erected instead in about 1700. This three-arched structure bears an "extravagant" Royal Arms of Queen Anne in its tympanum. Other 17th-century changes included the insertion of wooden altar rails and an altar table, the repair of the lancet windows with brick, and the construction of a south-side entrance porch. A vestry on the north side, while not contemporary, is of a similar era. Some small-scale work was carried out before 1724 by James Butler, the year in which Bishop of Chichester Thomas Bowers visited the church and remarked "church in extraordinarily good repair by the expence [sic] of James Butler Esq." Attributed to Butler was the blocking and rebuilding of certain windows and doors (and possibly the repairs in brick described by most sources as dating from the 17th century), the tall three-deck pulpit, and the font with its "bulgy stem" and very rare "font crane" (an iron bracket used to pull up the font cover). In about 1770, a set of box-pews was installed, with high backs and lockable ends; unusually, these survive in excellent condition. Such seats were "complete anathema to 19th-century restorers"; the church remained untouched at that time, making its set of pews the most notable in Sussex according to one source.

The ecclesiastical status of the Church of the Holy Sepulchre varied over the centuries following its split from Steyning. Late 16th-century curates and rectors were also linked to the churches at Thakeham and Itchingfield; after a long period in the late 17th century when the church had a resident vicar, curates once more served the church, usually from Thakeham but later from Ashington; and from 1845 the vicar of Ashington celebrated services himself. The parish was linked with that of Thakeham throughout the 18th century, until 1804; soon afterwards, until the church's first closure, it was linked to Ashington. A period of closure from about 1920 until 1933 led to damage by vandals, and repairs were carried out prior to the church's reopening. More damage, this time associated with the Second World War and declining congregations, led to the only full-scale restoration in the church's history: John Leopold Denman of the firm Denman & Sons carried out a "very sensitive" series of works ("beautifully done" according to Nikolaus Pevsner) in 1959–60, in which all parts of the building were inspected and structural defects corrected, the east window was improved and the ceiling was stripped down to reveal its original timbers.

The church was officially reunited with Thakeham again in 1940; it had been served from there since its 1933 reopening. The declining number of worshippers made it unviable, though, and on 1 April 1979 the Diocese of Chichester declared the Church of the Holy Sepulchre redundant. After that date, it was no longer used for religious services, and by 1984 a Sussex writer observed that "it looks as if nobody loves it any more" and feared potential demolition. However, on 21 April 1980, under the provisions of section 50 of the Pastoral Measure 1983, the Diocese of Chichester had placed the church into the care of the Redundant Churches Fund (now the Churches Conservation Trust). This registered charity looks after architecturally significant Anglican churches which are no longer used for regular worship. The building has been restored and is now open for visitors every day. It is considered particularly worth visiting for its "tranquillity ... and the breathtaking views to the south" towards Chanctonbury Ring. The Church Conservation Trust looks after four other redundant churches in West Sussex, at Chichester, Church Norton, North Stoke and Tortington.

The Church of the Holy Sepulchre was listed at Grade I by English Heritage on 15 March 1955. Such buildings are defined as being of "exceptional interest" and greater than national importance. As of February 2001, it was one of 38 Grade I listed buildings, and 1,726 listed buildings of all grades, in the district of Horsham.

== Architecture and fittings ==
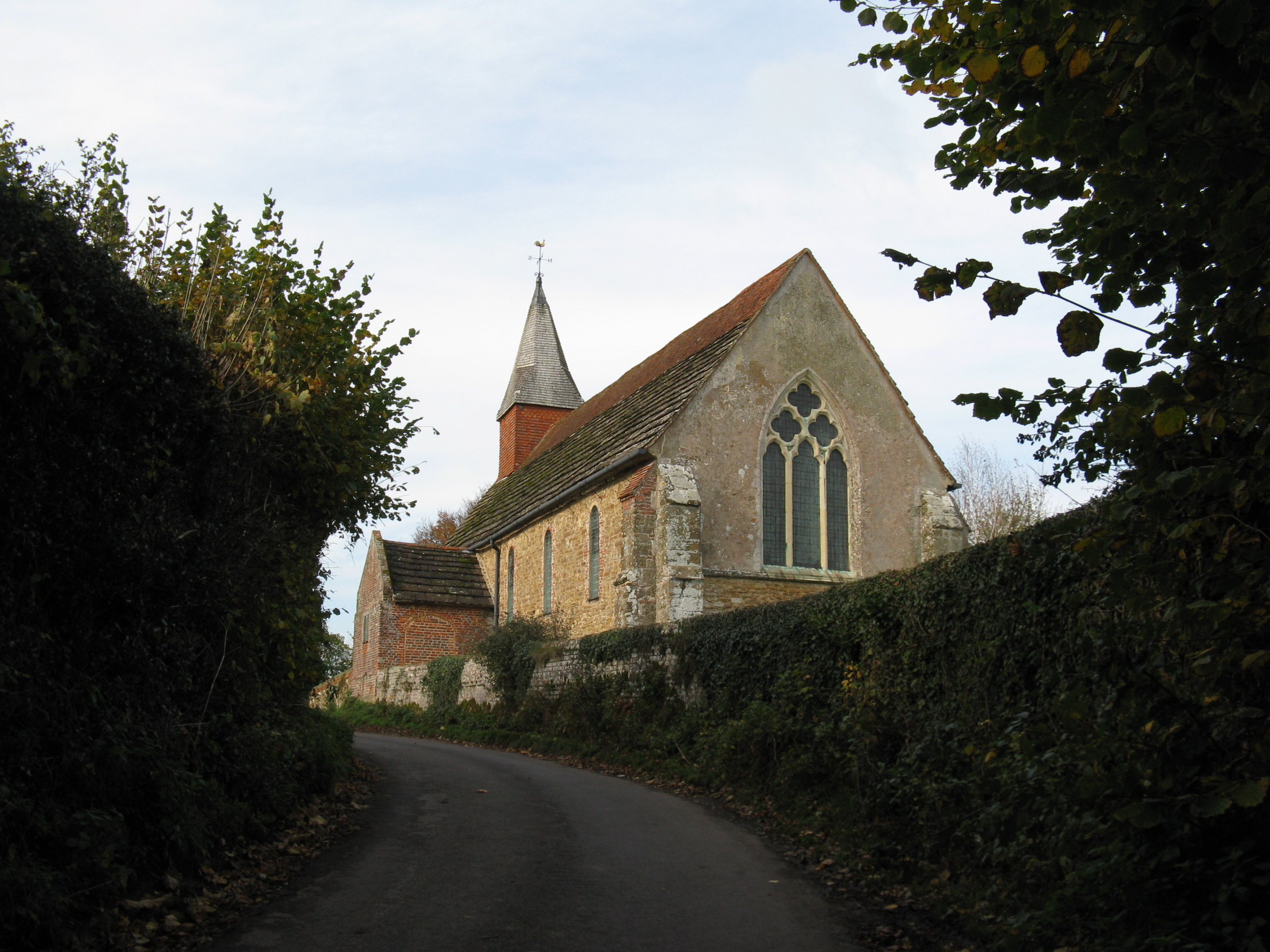
The former church from the adjacent lane

The Church of the Holy Sepulchre has a simple layout, only slightly altered from its 13th-century origins. It consists of a long, low single cell containing nave and chancel, a porch on the south side (now blocked, and containing the original entrance door), a vestry (formerly a private chapel) on the north side, an entrance in the liturgical west end and a bell-turret topped with a broach spire on the roof at the liturgical east end. The porch and vestry are of brick, but the rest of the building is stone with some protective render in places. There is no chancel arch. A round window of the 13th century sits high in the gabled west wall—a structure which has some local marble laid in courses. Other windows are single-light lancets, mostly given brick surrounds in the 17th or 18th century. The east window is wider, with three lights and quatrefoils—a good example of a simple 14th-century window in the Decorated Gothic style. Inside, the roof is also simple: single-framed with a few exposed beams. It probably dates from when the church was built.

The church has a "typically 18th-century" interior despite its mostly 13th-century exterior. The pale woodwork (mostly pine), large areas of plain glass and whitewashed walls give a bright appearance. The best feature, with no rival in Sussex for completeness and structural condition, is the late 18th-century pine box pews with Gothic Revival-style tracery at the ends. Also described by one historian as the best in the county is the rare three-deck pulpit, also of the 18th century. The pine screen between the nave and chancel has a "splendid" and "wonderfully naïve" painted plasterwork Royal Arms in its tympanum, repainted in 1845. Such examples, painted straight on plaster and mounted on woodwork, are unusual in Sussex.

The north chapel was built in 1619 by Henry Shelley as a vault and private chapel for the Shelley family. One family member, Edward Shelley (died 1554), is commemorated by a small brass memorial in a Perpendicular Gothic-style wall recess, depicting his wife and ten children kneeling in front of him. One son Edward is depicted without his head. He was hanged in 1588 as a recusant catholic and beautified in 1929 as a martyr. Other memorials include two large "Baroque-style" 18th-century tablets decorated with the heads of putti, and three hanging monuments in marble—a style which became popular in Sussex in the 17th and 18th centuries.

== See also ==
- Grade I listed buildings in West Sussex
- List of churches preserved by the Churches Conservation Trust in Southeast England
- List of places of worship in Horsham (district)
