= Big Church Festival =

Christian music festival in West Sussex, England

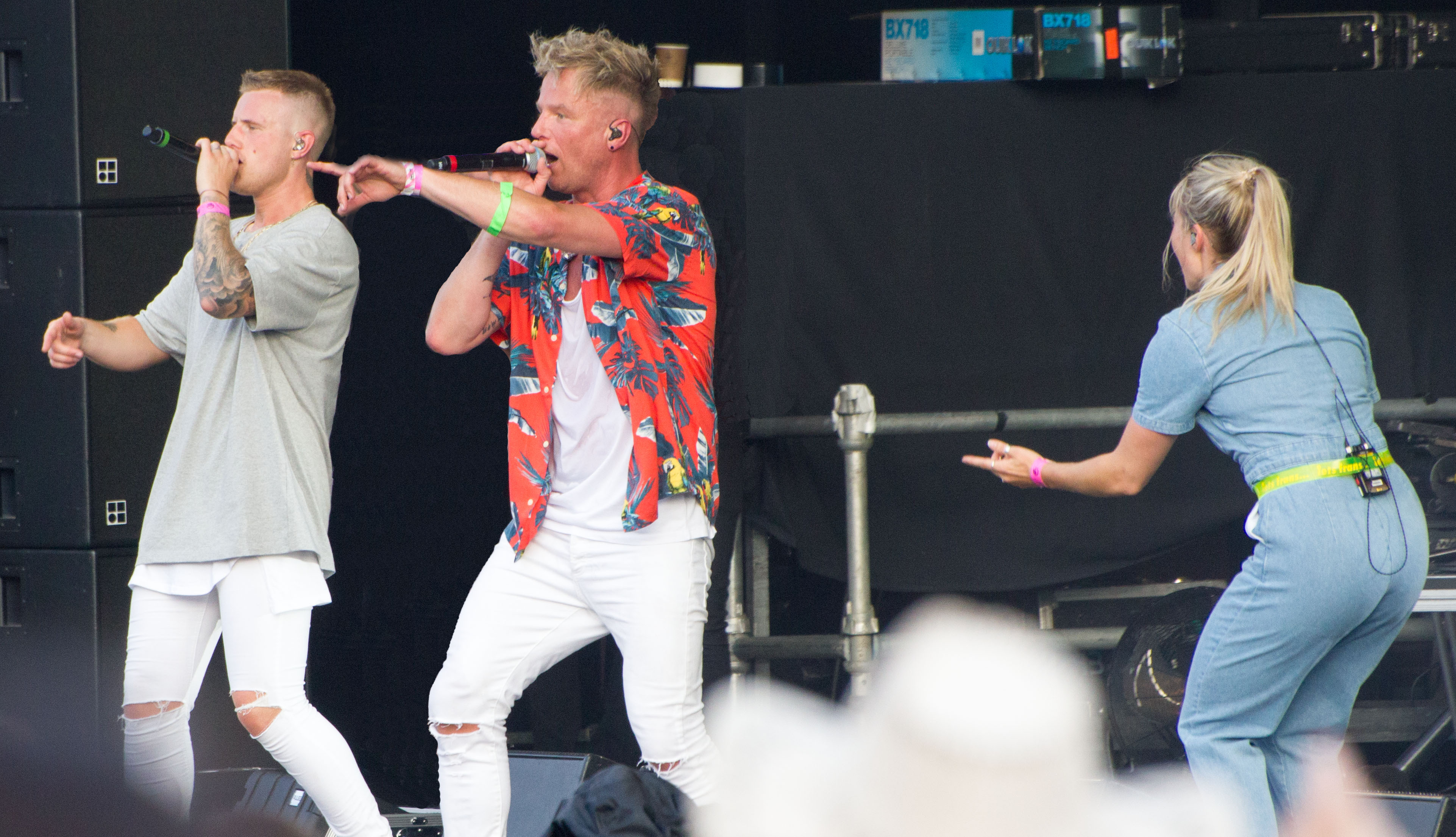
- LZ7 performing at Big Church Day Out, 2019
- Genre: Christian rock, Christian worship, gospel music, Christian rap, and contemporary worship music
- Dates: 28-30 August 2026
- Locations: Wiston House, Wiston, West Sussex, United Kingdom
- Years active: 2009–present
- Website: www.bigchurchfestival.com

The Big Church Festival, formerly known as Big Church Day Out, is a Christian non-profit music festival created by Tim Jupp, a founding member of Delirious?, taking place in Wiston, West Sussex, England, known for its contemporary Christian music. The festival has different genres of music, such as Christian rock, contemporary worship music, gospel, and Christian rap.

== History ==
In 2009, the festival started as "Big Church Day Out", intending to present for one day, but it was extended to three days in Sussex in 2010, with an additional day in the Midlands version of the festival. The 2009 festival had 15,000 attendees, which increased in 2010 to 25,000. In 2011, the length of the festival was reduced to two days, and the number of attendees decreased to 20,000. Since 2012, attendance has returned over 25,000 people each year at the BCDO South festival in West Sussex. After two consecutive years of the festival being cancelled due to the COVID-19 pandemic, the festival returned in 2022 under the name 'Big Church Festival', with an expanded site and 40,000 attendees. In 2025 it took place during the August Bank Holiday, with 35,000 attendees over the weekend.

On Friday 28 August 2026, a wooden archway portal sign and its metal supports failed, possibly due to high winds. A 41-year-old man named Robert Guaco died and at least 7 people were injured, with emergency services being called to the festival site. Out of respect and as a result of safety fears, the festival closed early.

== Lineups ==
Rock bands and artists who have previously appeared at the event include YFriday, for KING & COUNTRY, Switchfoot, Casting Crowns, Newsboys, Delirious?, Jesus Culture, BOSH, Rend Collective, Matt Redman, Martin Smith, LZ7, Lecrae, The Abrams, Mica Paris, Pat Barrett, Joshua Luke Smith, Elle Limebear, Jeremy Camp, Dance Like Kings, Brandon Lake, Phil Wickham, Elevation Rhythm, Abbie Gamboa and more.
