= Thakeham =

Village and parish in West Sussex, England

Coordinates: 50.94394°N 0.42214°W

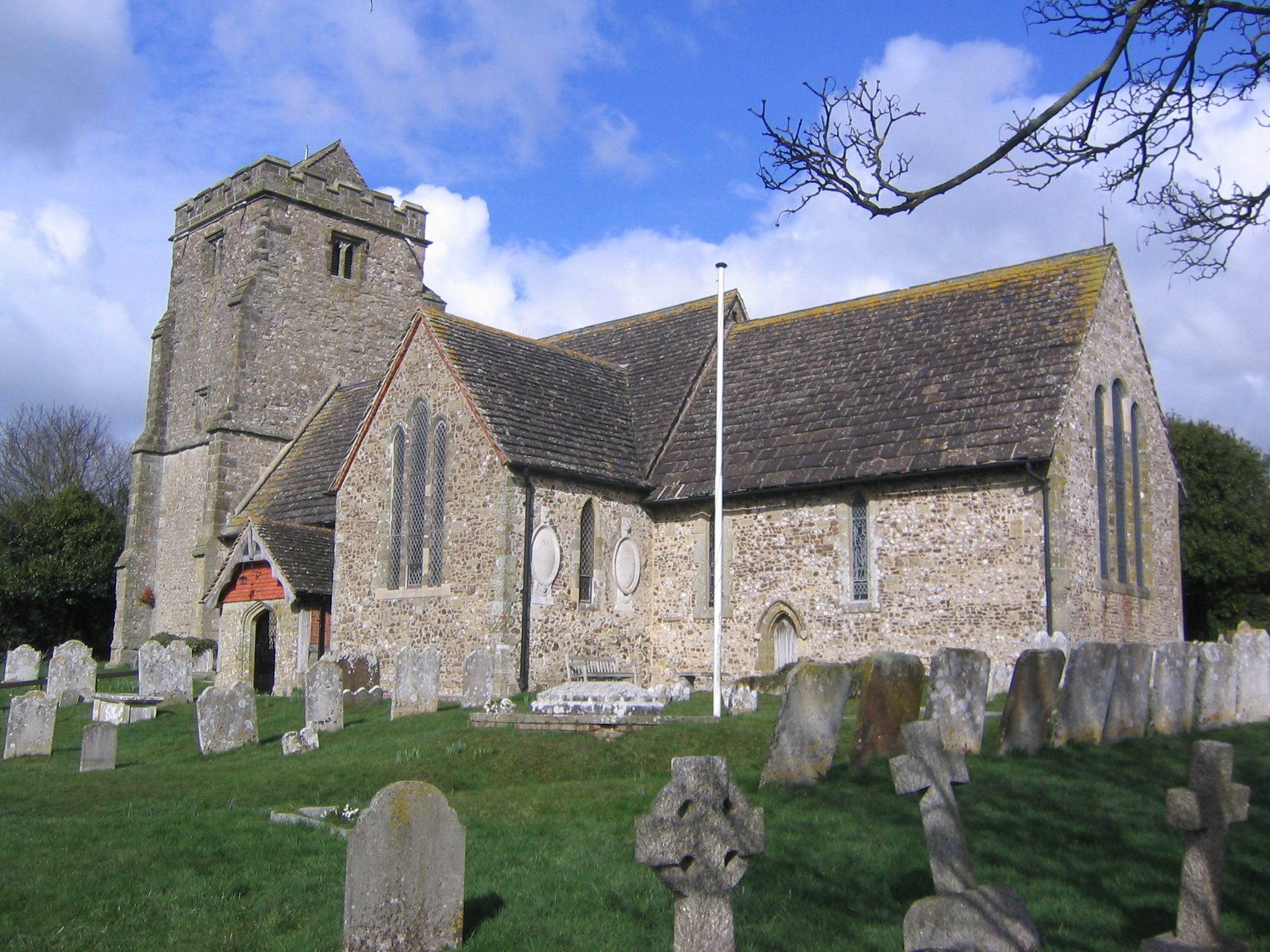
- Church of St Mary

- Location within West Sussex
- Area: 11.71 km^{2} (4.52 sq mi)
- Population: 1,794 2001 Census; 1,816 (Census 2011)
  - Density: 153/km^{2} (400/sq mi)
- OS grid reference: TQ109172
  - London: 41 miles (66 km) NNE
- Civil parish: Thakeham
- District: Horsham
- Shire county: West Sussex
- Region: South East
- Country: England
- Sovereign state: United Kingdom
- Post town: PULBOROUGH
- Postcode district: RH20
- Dialling code: 01798
- Police: Sussex
- Fire: West Sussex
- Ambulance: South East Coast
- UK Parliament: Arundel and South Downs
- Website: http://www.thakehamparish.gov.uk/

Thakeham is a village and civil parish located north of the South Downs in the Horsham District of West Sussex, England. The village is situated approximately 12 miles south-west of Horsham and 11 miles north of the sea-side town of Worthing. Its nearest large village is Storrington (3 miles). The parish includes the hamlets of Abingworth and Goose Green and has a land area of 1170.6 hectares (2891 acres).

== History ==
The village is mentioned in Domesday Book,(as Taceham) but human occupation goes back to Neolithic times. The name Thakeham means “thatched homestead” and the original village had just one main street (“The Street”) which is home to the village's only pub, The White Lion, and St Mary's church (12th century) and is now a designated conservation area. Recent examination of timber beams shows that a hall was constructed on The Street towards the end of Henry VIII's reign (1540s) although the beams themselves may have been felled for another structure in the 1300s.

Towards the end of World War 1, from February 1917 until February 1918, there was a Royal Flying Corps Home Defence day and night landing ground in the north of Thakeham Parish abutting Shipley Parish south/east of Sincox Lane and east of Ingrams Furze. Initially used by BE2c and BE12 aeroplanes operated by the Hove-based 78 Squadron until a tactical rearrangement in September 1917 saw 39 Squadron take over with Bristol F2b Fighters. Both squadrons were tasked with defending south coast targets from attacks by German Gotha bombers. The same location was used post-war for an unknown period by the Royal Air Force as a temporary flying ground and, according to the Worthing Herald of 8 September 1928, large crowds used to spend hours watching the flying and local dances were planned for RAF personnel stationed there. From 1933 to 1935, 'Thakeham Old Aerodrome' was the venue for annual air displays by Alan Cobham's Flying Circus. Local newspapers also promoted further air displays by C W A Scott and Tom Campbell Black in April and June 1936 but these may well have been cancelled as neither event was reported afterwards.

Land use in the parish is predominantly agricultural, dominated by farming and wooded areas (with outstanding bluebell displays in the spring). As well as the original centre in The Street, the parish includes the hamlets of Abingworth and Goose Green.

The parish's main population now groups south of The Street in the Abingworth area, and further south in a section of the north-eastern suburb of Storrington within the Thakeham boundary. In the 2011 census 1816 people lived in 707 households.

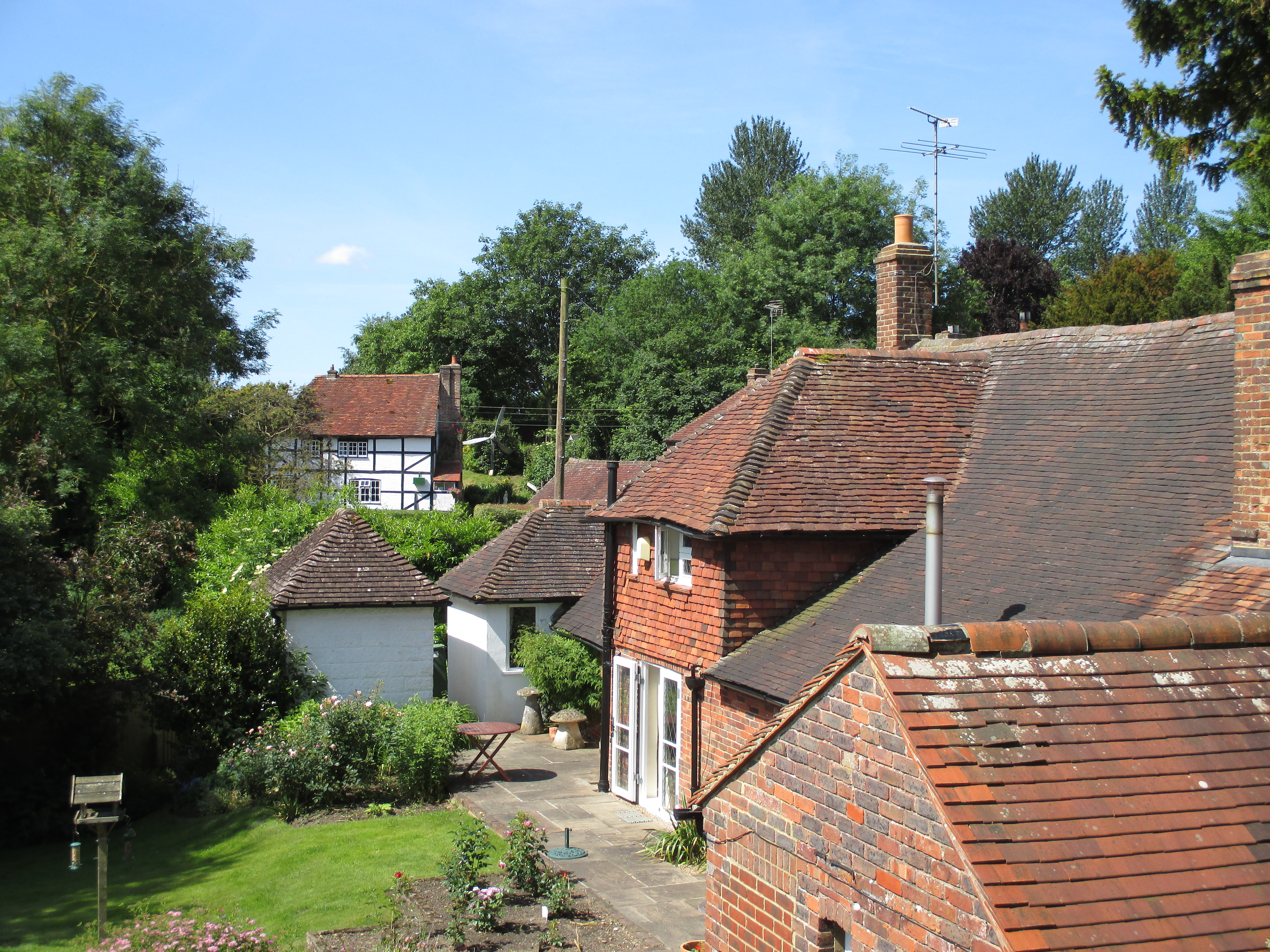
View from the churchyard

== Mushroom industry ==
The mushroom factory originally existed on two sites - the main remaining site sits between the original village and the edge of Abingworth. A secondary location further south was sold for housing in the early noughties. From the profits of the sale, Sussex Mushrooms modernised and consolidated the going concern at the remaining site. In April 2011 after much delay, Horsham District Council announced they had approved the plans for 150 new homes. By 2018, houses had been built around a cricket pitch. In addition, the developers built a village hall, a veterinary surgery and shop/café.

== Landmarks ==
Heritage assets in the parish include the 13th century Church of the Holy Sepulchre in Warminghurst, and Little Thakeham, a Grade I listed country house on Merrywood Lane, designed by the architect Edwin Lutyens in 1902. Further south are two schools Thakeham Primary and Steyning Grammar Rock Road and Thakeham Tiles, the other industry in the village, all situated on Rock Road.

== Sport ==
A village cricket team representing Linfield Mushrooms (as they were then called) folded in the 1970s but a club was revived following a merger with neighbours, West Chiltington, at the end of the 20th century to form West Chiltington & Thakeham Cricket Club. As part of the developer's proposals at Abingworth, a new cricket pitch and pavilion was created as well as football pitches for the currently dormant Thakeham Village FC. The cricket club host their Men's 3rd and 4th XI's plus Women's and some colts games there.

== Notable people ==
- Sir Archibald James, MC (1893 – 1980) was a British Conservative Party politician and Royal Air Force pioneer. He lived at Champions Farm in Thakeham from 1955 to 1980.
- Anna Massey, (1937 – 2011), actor who played Miss Prism alongside Colin Firth and Rupert Everett in the 2002 film version of The Importance of Being Earnest, was born in the village in 1937. She died in 2011.
- Sir Oswald Mosley, 4th Baronet (1848-1915), landowner lived at Abingworth Hall in the years preceding his death.
