= Wilton Park =

Executive agency in the United Kingdom

Agency overview
- Formed: 12 January 1946; 79 years ago
- Headquarters: Wiston House, West Sussex
- Agency executives: Gisela Stuart, Chair; Tom Cargill, Chief Executive
- Parent department: Foreign, Commonwealth and Development Office
- Website: wiltonpark.org.uk

Wilton Park is an executive agency of the UK Foreign, Commonwealth & Development Office providing a global forum for strategic discussion.

Based since 1951 at Wiston House in Sussex, it organises over 70 dialogues a year in the UK and overseas, bringing together leading representatives from the worlds of politics, business, academia, diplomacy, civil society and media.

In 2021, Wilton Park celebrated its 75th anniversary.

== History ==
Wilton Park was founded 12 January 1946 by Heinz Koeppler as part of an initiative inspired by Winston Churchill, who in 1944 called for Britain to help establish a democracy in Germany after the Second World War. It takes its name from the Wilton Park Estate, near Beaconsfield in Buckinghamshire: between January 1946 and June 1948 more than 4,000 Germans attended re-education classes to discuss democratic processes with visiting political figures and intellectuals.

In 1968 Prince Philip, Duke of Edinburgh visited Wilton Park for its 100th conference.

In 1991, Wilton Park became an Executive Agency to 'give it more operational autonomy and a more secure financial footing' through the opportunity to raise more of its funding, and it now raises all its running costs.

In 1980, Wilton Park was used as a venue for South African representatives to meet behind closed doors. In 1988, Wilton Park held its first overseas conference outside Helsinki to debate Europe in the 1990s.

In 2006, Wilton Park marked its 60th anniversary with a private dinner and a speech delivered by Lord Triesman on future conflicts.

In 2009, Richard Burge, a former head of the Countryside Alliance (1999–2003) and Director General of the Zoological Society of London (1995–1999), took over as Chief Executive. In 2010 Wilton Park held its first conference on cyber security after the Strategic Defence and Security Review 2010 identified cyber attacks as a major threat to the United Kingdom.

Baroness Gisela Stuart was appointed Chair of Wilton Park in October 2018. Tom Cargill has been the Chief Executive of Wilton Park since January 2021.

== Wilton Park dialogues ==
Wilton Park organises specifically tailored events on key global issues. Events are typically in person, but can be virtual or hybrid also. During the COVID-19 pandemic in 2020–21, Wilton Park facilitated over 100 virtual dialogues. While Wilton Park dialogues are traditionally hosted at Wiston House, events can take place at different venues and are increasingly being held internationally outside of the UK. Wilton Park has hosted conferences in countries including Slovenia, Sweden, Serbia, Switzerland, USA, Finland, Uganda, Malaysia, Czech Republic, Japan, Brazil, Germany, Norway and more.

Meetings provide a neutral environment where conflicting views can be expressed and debated openly and calmly, allowing acceptable compromise and resolution to be achieved. It encourages innovation in global thinking by provoking lively debate and promoting inclusivity among the policy makers and opinion formers. Discussions are non-attributable, held under the Wilton Park Protocol, to encourage frank exchanges and open dialogue.

Wilton Park's policy priorities include:

- Conflict prevention, resolution and state building
- Defence and security
- Global economy
- Global health
- Human rights, good governance and faith
- Multilateral institutions, key countries and regions
- Sustainable development and the environment
