= Wiston House =

House in Wiston, West Sussex, UK

Coordinates: 50°53′59″N 0°21′32″W

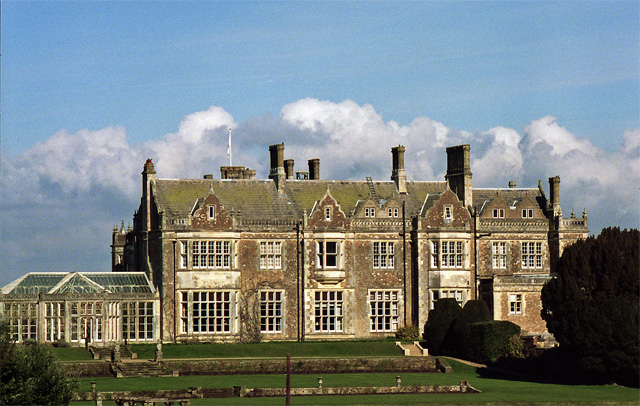
Wiston House

Wiston House is a 16th-century English country house set in the South Downs National Park on the south coast of England, surrounded by over 6,000 acres (2,400 ha) of parkland in Wiston, West Sussex. It is the home of Wilton Park, an executive agency of the Foreign and Commonwealth Office.

Originally built in two storeys to an irregular floor plan, substantial parts of the house were subsequently demolished and replaced, with additional wings added. It is a Grade I listed building.

== History ==
The house was built for Thomas Shirley around 1576, and it was substantially enlarged by Edward Blore in the early 19th century. It was captured first by the Royalists and then by the Parliamentarians during the English Civil War.

It was bought by Sir John Fagg in 1649 and acquired in 1743 by Sir Charles Goring, the husband of Fagg's great-granddaughter. During the Second World War, the grounds were used as a camp by the 10th battalion Highland Light Infantry as they prepared for the Normandy landings.

Since 1951, the house has been the base of Wilton Park, an executive agency of the Foreign and Commonwealth Office, providing a global forum for strategic discussion.

Wiston House is still owned by members of the Goring family, who open the grounds every year for the Big Church Festival (previously known as the Big Church Day Out).

== The Church of St Mary ==
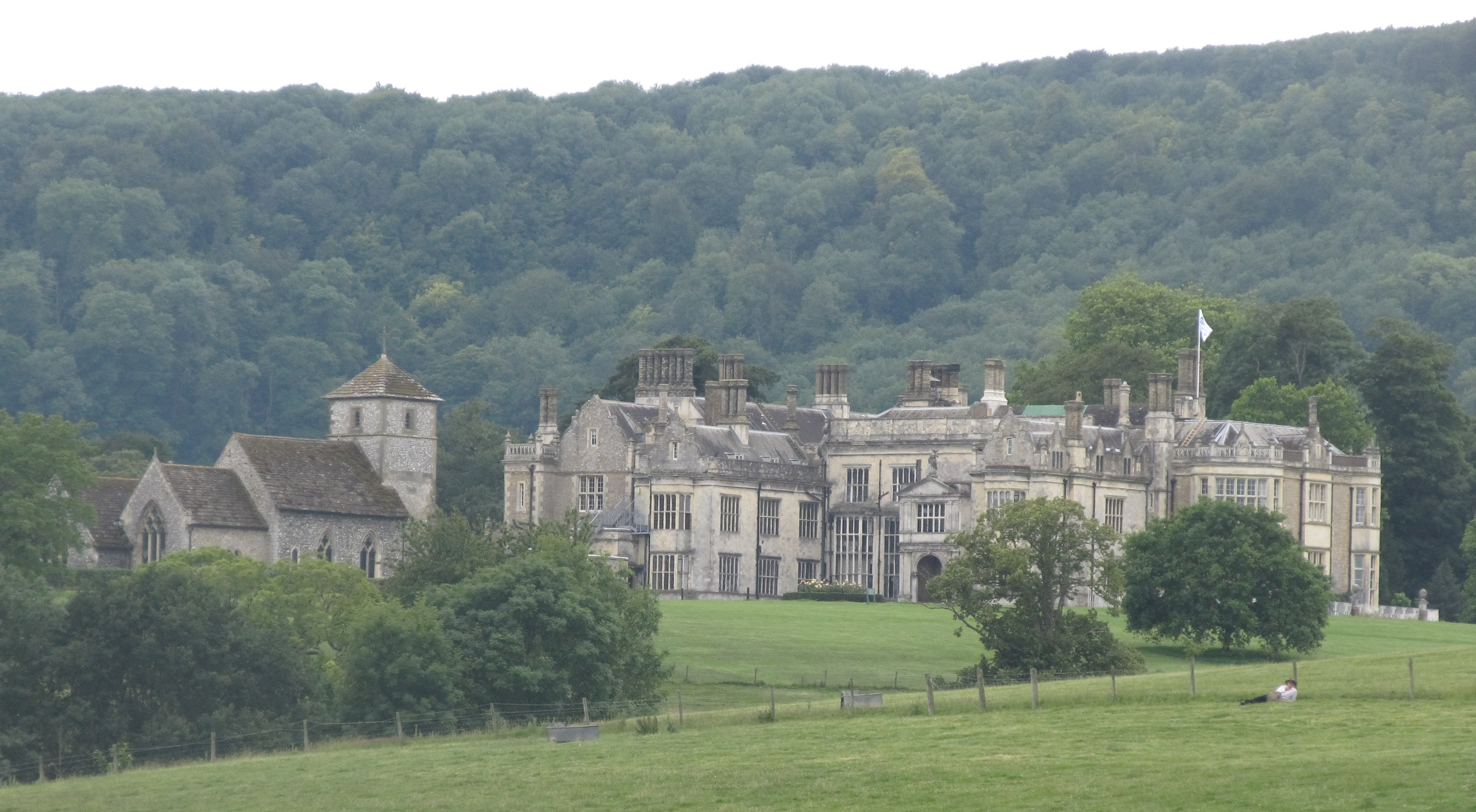
View of the house, with the church on the left

Close to the house is the Parish Church of St Mary, which comprises a chancel, a south chapel, twin naves and a tower. It is a Grade II* listed building.

Mainly dating from the 14th century, it was heavily restored by architect Gordon MacDonald Hills in 1862. The south chapel contains a brass to Sir John de Braose, dated 1426, and the tombs of the Shirley family.
