= Wiston, West Sussex =

Village in West Sussex, England

Coordinates: 50.91613°N 0.37401°W

Wiston
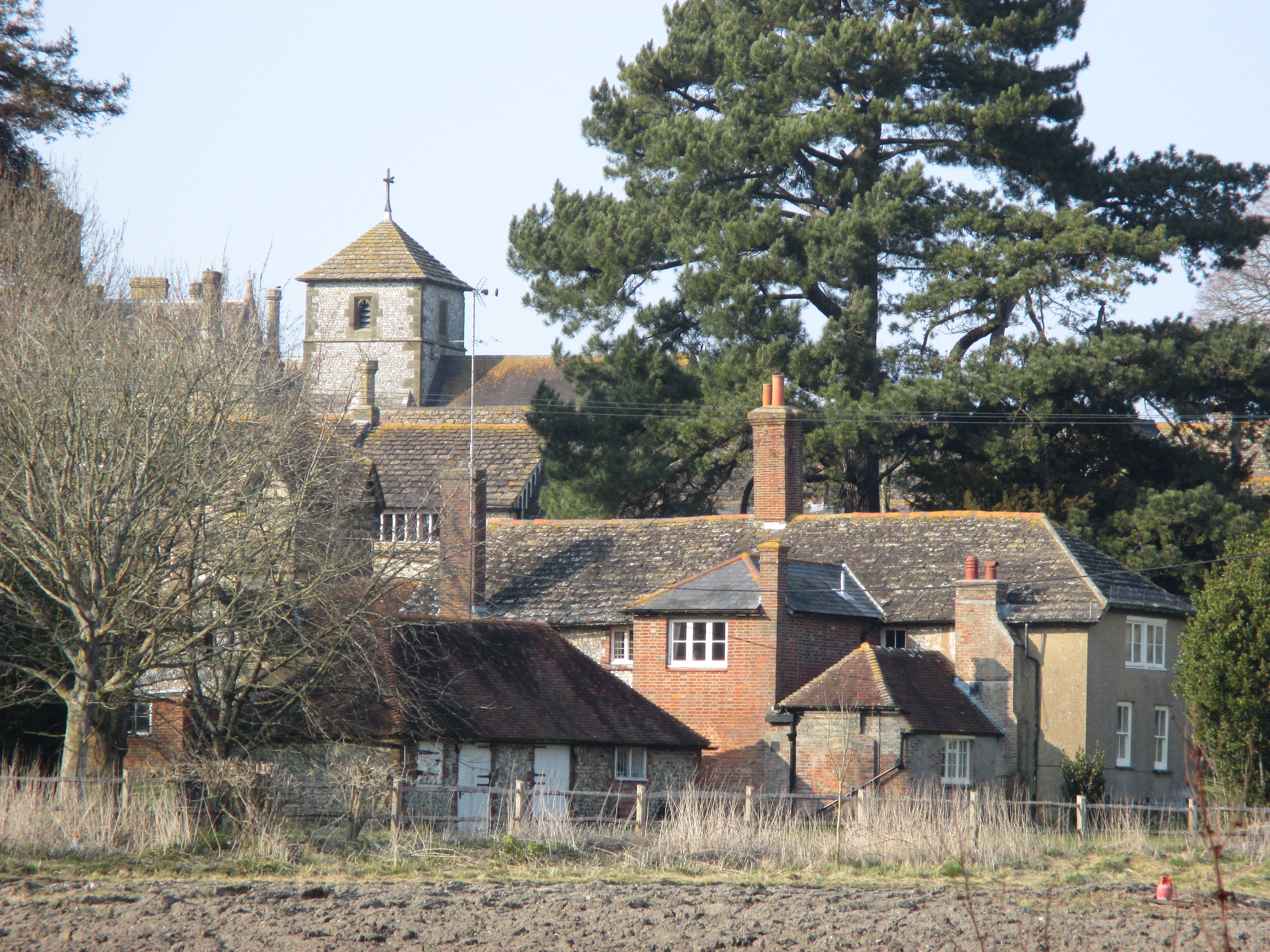
- Buildings on the estate of Wiston House

- Location within West Sussex
- Area: 13.60 km^{2} (5.25 sq mi)
- Population: 221 2001 Census
  - Density: 16/km^{2} (41/sq mi)
- OS grid reference: TQ143142
  - London: 42 miles (68 km) NNE
- Civil parish: Wiston
- District: Horsham
- Shire county: West Sussex
- Region: South East
- Country: England
- Sovereign state: United Kingdom
- Post town: STEYNING
- Postcode district: BN44
- Dialling code: 01903
- Police: Sussex
- Fire: West Sussex
- Ambulance: South East Coast
- UK Parliament: Arundel and South Downs

Wiston is a scattered village and civil parish in the Horsham District of West Sussex, England. It lies on the A283 road 2.8 miles (4.5 km) northwest of Steyning.

The parish covers an area of 1,360 hectares (3,400 acres). In the 2001 census 221 people lived in 86 households, of whom 120 were economically active.

== Landmarks ==
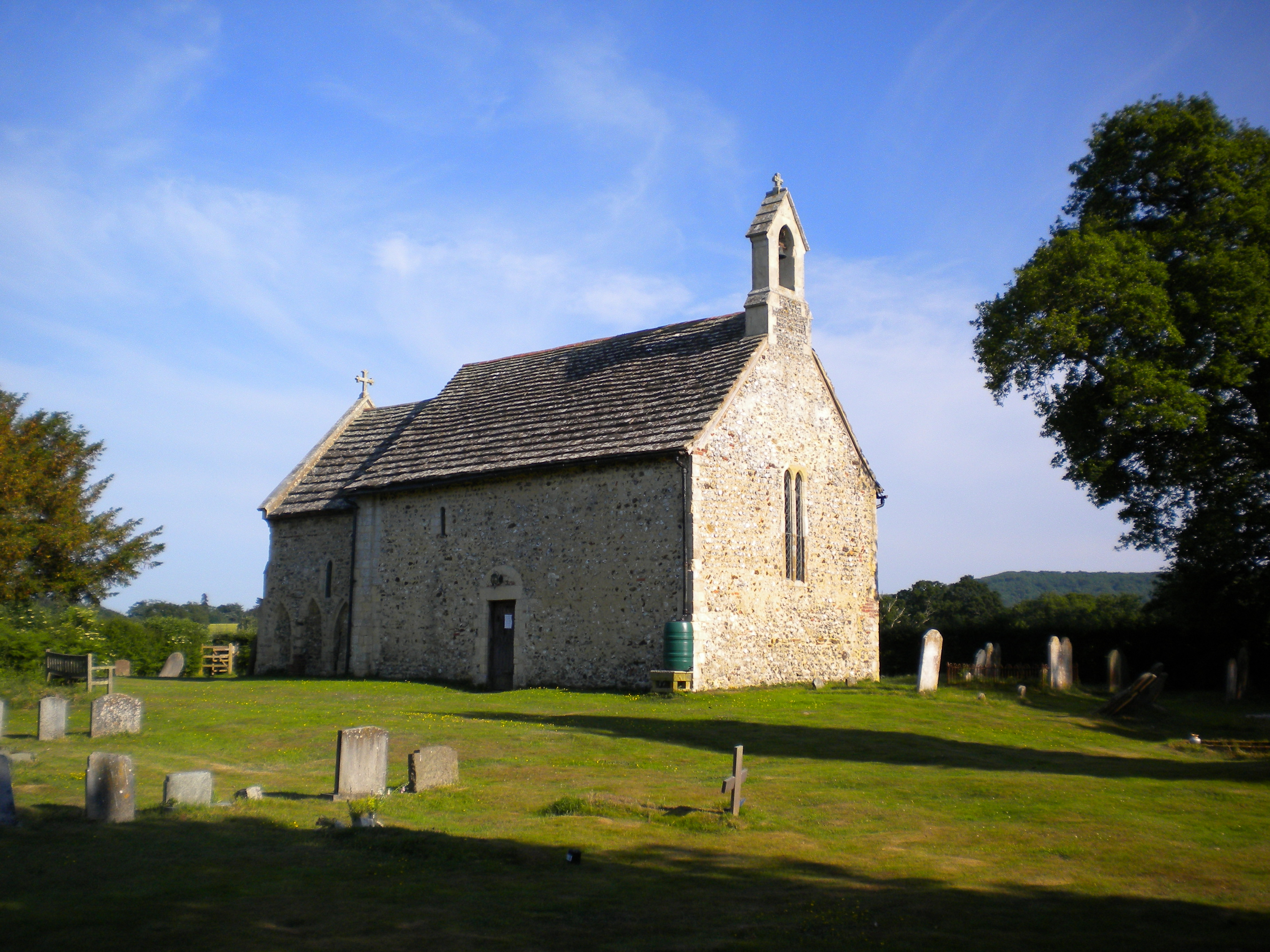
All Saints Chapel at Buncton

Chanctonbury Ring, a hill fort based ring of trees atop Chanctonbury Hill on the South Downs, lies on the border of the parish and the neighbouring parish of Washington. Chanctonbury Hill is a Site of Special Scientific Interest as an uncommon woodland type on a chalk escarpment, providing habitat for many species including the protected Great Crested Newt.
