= Ashington, West Sussex =

Village and parish in West Sussex, England

Coordinates: 50.93365°N 0.39109°W

Ashington
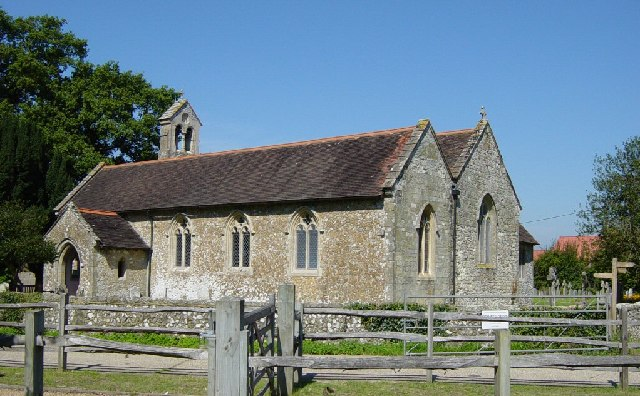
- St Peter and St Paul's Church

- Location within West Sussex
- Area: 8.05 km^{2} (3.11 sq mi)
- Population: 2,351 2001 Census; 2,526 (2011 Census)
  - Density: 292/km^{2} (760/sq mi)
- OS grid reference: TQ131161
  - London: 41 miles (66 km) NNE
- Civil parish: Ashington
- District: Horsham
- Shire county: West Sussex
- Region: South East
- Country: England
- Sovereign state: United Kingdom
- Post town: PULBOROUGH
- Postcode district: RH20
- Dialling code: 01903
- Police: Sussex
- Fire: West Sussex
- Ambulance: South East Coast
- UK Parliament: Arundel and South Downs
- Website: http://www.ashingtonpc.org.uk/

Ashington is a village and civil parish in the Horsham District of West Sussex, England. It lies on the A24 road 3 miles (4.8 km) north-east of Storrington.

The parish has a land area of 805 hectares (1,990 acres). In the 2001 census 2351 people lived in 905 households, of whom 1286 were economically active. The 2011 Census population was 2,526

== Amenities and transport ==
The ancient Anglican parish church is dedicated to St Peter and St Paul.

Ashington won two regional categories (Business and Community Life) in the Calor Village of the Year competition in 2001 and was the overall Southern region winner in 2003.

Metrobus operate bus route 23 which links the village to Worthing, Horsham and Crawley.

== Sport ==
Ashington Cougars has football teams from under 6 to under 16 and play in the Horsham and District Youth Football League. Starting in 1999, it attained Charter Development status with Sussex FA in 2009. In 2011 the club were a finalist in the Sussex "Sports Club of the Year" awards where it was recognised for its work in player and community development.
