= Parham, West Sussex =

Civil parish in West Sussex, England

Coordinates: 50.918°N 0.493°W

Parham
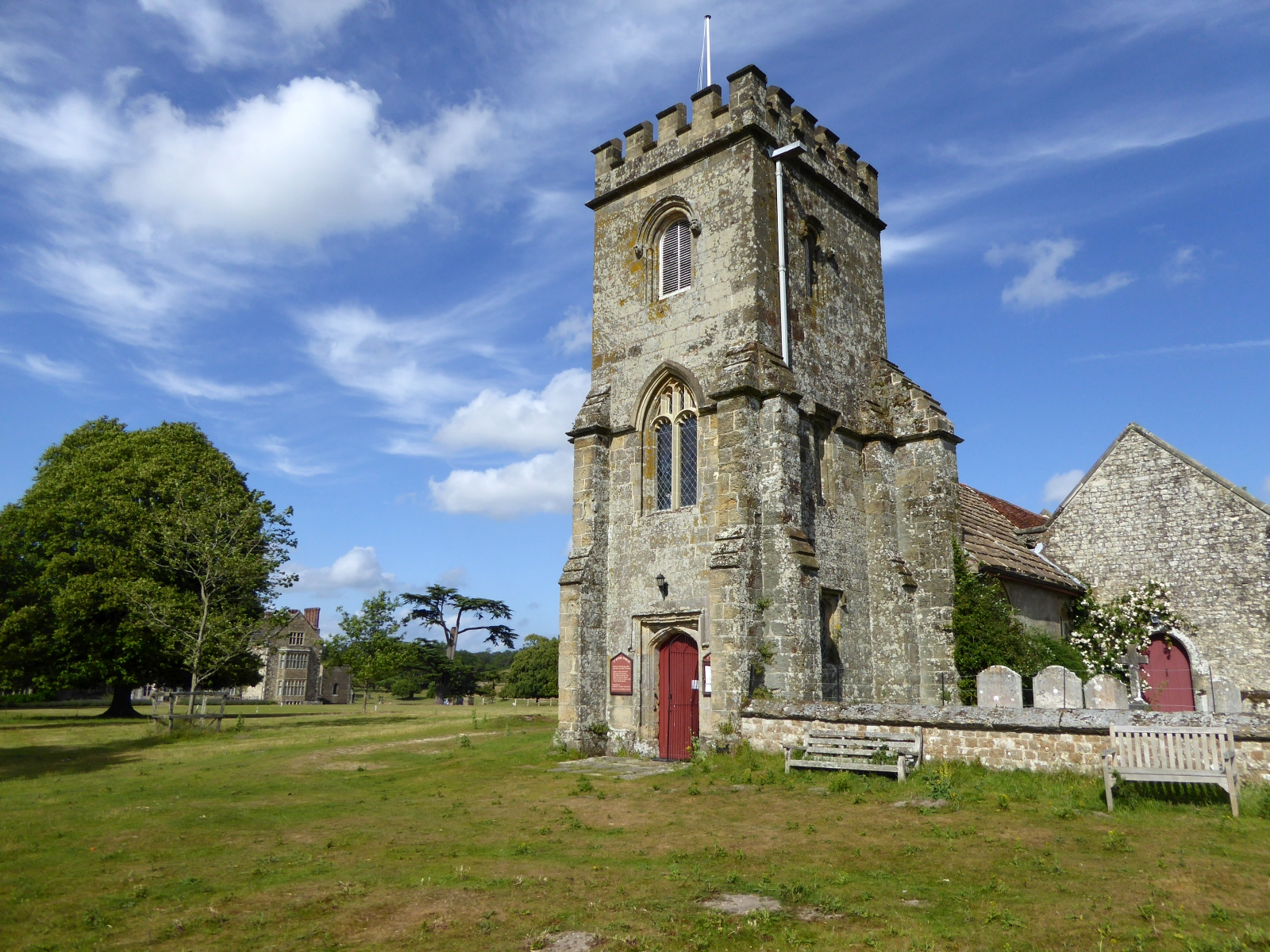
- St Peter's church in Parham Park

- Location within West Sussex
- Area: 15.86 km^{2} (6.12 sq mi)
- Population: 214 (2001 Census); 224 (2011 Census)
  - Density: 13/km^{2} (34/sq mi)
- OS grid reference: TQ060142
  - London: 43 miles (69 km) NNE
- Civil parish: Parham
- District: Horsham
- Shire county: West Sussex
- Region: South East
- Country: England
- Sovereign state: United Kingdom
- Post town: Pulborough
- Postcode district: RH20
- Dialling code: 01903
- Police: Sussex
- Fire: West Sussex
- Ambulance: South East Coast
- UK Parliament: Arundel and South Downs

Parham is a civil parish in the Horsham District of West Sussex, England. There was a village of Parham, around the parish church, but its few houses were destroyed in the early 19th century to create the landscaped park and gardens. The parish now consists of Parham Park and the farms and smaller settlements around it. The village is between Wiggonholt and Cootham, about 3 miles (4.8 km) south of Pulborough on the A283 road.

The parish covers 1,586 hectares (3,920 acres). The 2001 Census recorded 214 people living in 95 households, of whom 124 were economically active. At the 2011 Census the population was 224.

The civil parish includes the hamlets of Rackham, southwest of Parham Park, and Wiggonholt on the A283 to the north, which has a small parish church.

== History ==
The Church of England parish church of Saint Peter has a blocked two-bay arcade in the north wall of the nave that shows there used to be a north aisle. The lower part of the bell-tower is Perpendicular Gothic and the south chapel remains as it was built in 1545, but the remainder of the building was remodelled in the Georgian Gothick fashion in about 1820. The font is a rare lead one from the middle of the 14th century, repeatedly inscribed with the legend IHS Nazar and the arms of Sir Andrew Peverel (d. 1376), who was a Knight of the Shire in 1351.

Parham Park originated as a grange of Westminster Abbey. After the Dissolution of the Monasteries it was converted into a south-facing E-shaped Elizabethan country house.

== Nature reserves ==
Parham Park grounds are a Site of Special Scientific Interest. with a special biological interest for its epiphytic lichen flora, as an area for two rare beetles and its large heronry.

Pulborough Brooks, a nature reserve in the north of the parish is also an SSSI. It is beside the River Arun which floods in winter, providing a rich habitat for wading birds, ducks and geese. Part of the area is an RSPB reserve.

== Sources ==
- Nairn, Ian; Pevsner, Nikolaus (1965). Sussex. The Buildings of England. Harmondsworth: Penguin Books. pp. 290–292. ISBN 0-14-071028-0.
