= Wiggonholt =

Village in West Sussex, England

Coordinates: 50.939°N 0.488°W

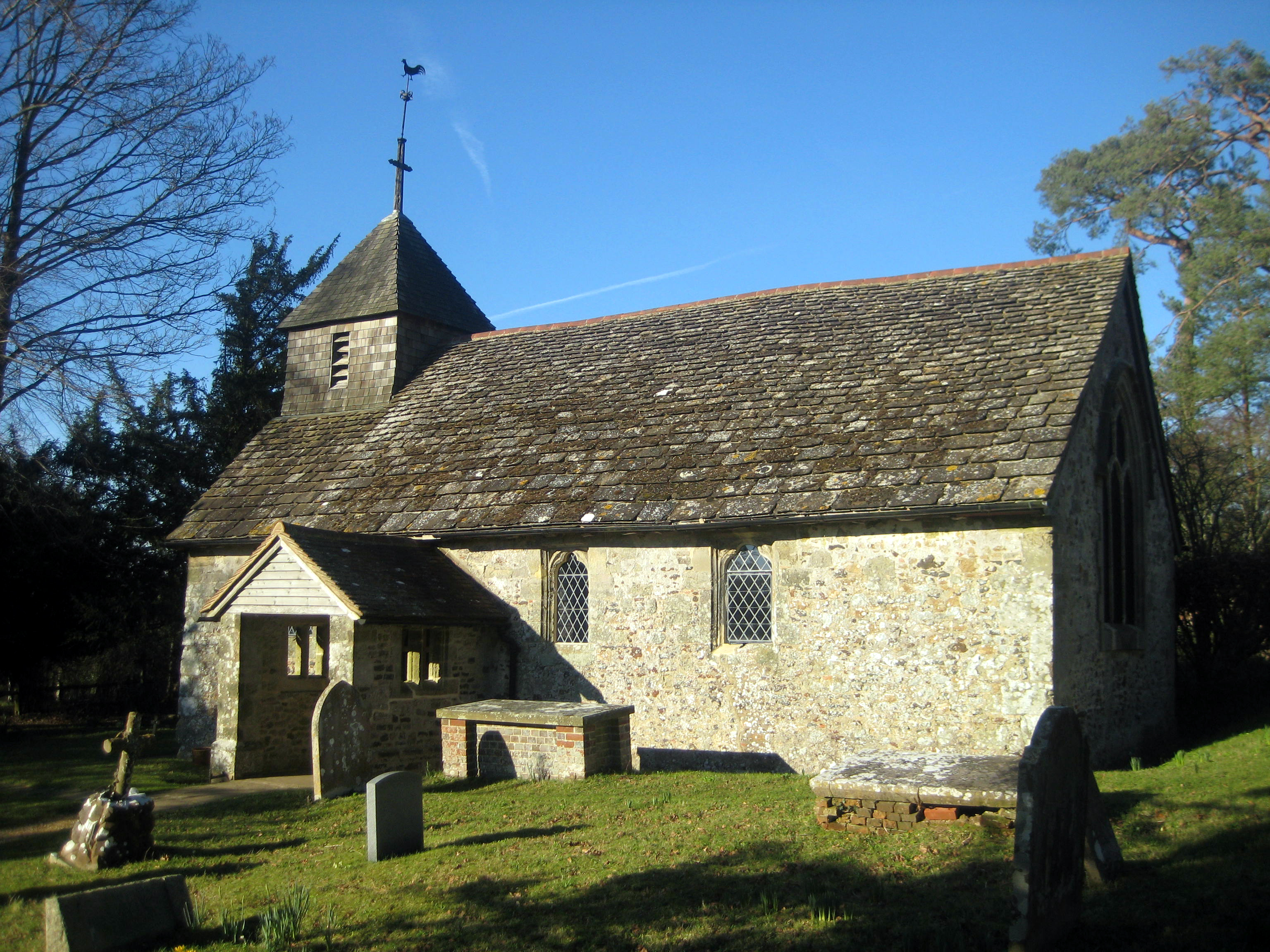
- Wiggonholt parish church

- Location within West Sussex
- OS grid reference: TQ063166
- Civil parish: Parham
- District: Horsham
- Shire county: West Sussex
- Region: South East
- Country: England
- Sovereign state: United Kingdom
- Post town: PULBOROUGH
- Postcode district: RH20
- Police: Sussex
- Fire: West Sussex
- Ambulance: South East Coast
- UK Parliament: Arundel and South Downs

Wiggonholt is a village and former civil parish, now in the parish of Parham, in the Horsham district of West Sussex, England. It is 1.5 miles (2.4 km) southeast of Pulborough on the A283 road. The village consists of a farm, a few houses and a small Church of England parish church. In 1931 the parish had a population of 54. On 1 April 1933 the parish was abolished and merged with Parham.

The RSPB Pulborough Brooks wildfowl reserve is north of the parish church, on the floodplain of the River Arun. Wiggonholt Common is an area of open woodland south of the village that adjoins Parham Park and is popular with walkers.

A Roman road, the Greensand Way, from north of Lewes passed north of the village to join Stane Street at Hardham on the west bank of the River Arun. The remains of a Roman bath house have been excavated beside the Roman road.

The small rectangular medieval parish church of unknown dedication has a bell turret and Horsham Stone roof, and has a Sussex marble font.

== Notable residents ==
- John Broadwood (song collector), curate from 1832 to 1851.
- Admiral Sir Reginald Hugh Spencer Bacon, KCB, KCVO, DSO (6 September 1863 – 9 June 1947)
