= St Joseph's Hall =

- Interactive map of St Joseph's Hall
- 50.91352°N 0.45934°W
- Location: St Joseph's Hall, Greyfriars Lane, Storrington, Pulborough, West Sussex, RH20 United Kingdom

History
- Built: 1910
- Built for: George Trotter

Site notes
- Architect: Edward Turner Powell (1859-1937)
- Architectural style: Vernacular/Revivalism

Listed Building – Grade II
- Official name: Gerston Hall, Greyfriars Lane
- Designated: 6 January 2005
- Reference no.: 1391342

St Joseph's Hall in Greyfriars Lane, Storrington, West Sussex is a Grade II listed former residence of the Bishop of Arundel and Brighton. It was built as a private house for US businessman George Trotter in 1910, and then sold to a French religious order, the Norbertines. In 1956 it was used by Vincent and Nona Byrne as a home for refugees from the Hungarian uprising.
