= Sullington =

Village in West Sussex, England

Coordinates: 50.90685°N 0.43882°W

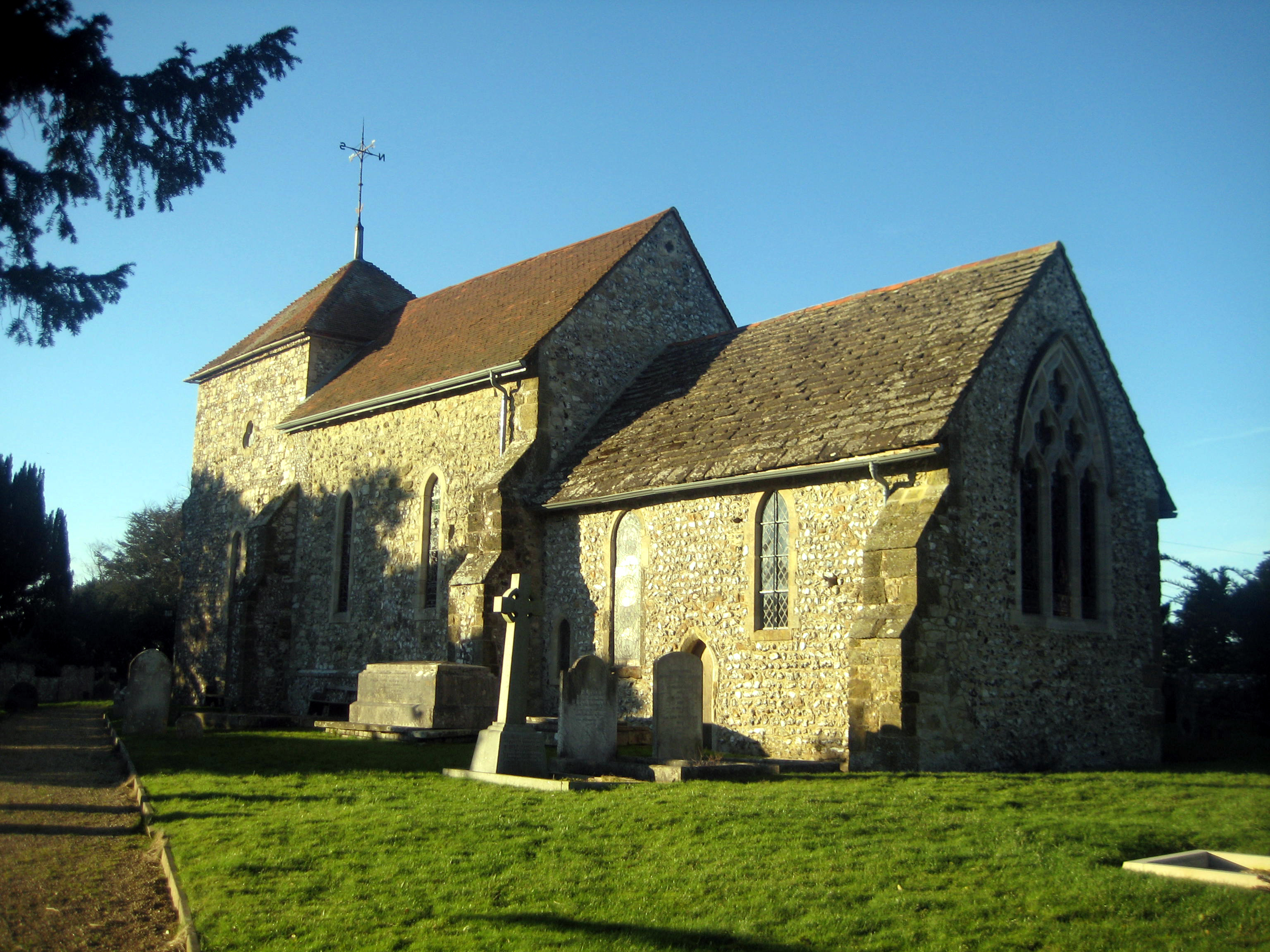
- Church of St Mary

- Location within West Sussex
- OS grid reference: TQ099131
- Civil parish: Storrington and Sullington
- District: Horsham
- Shire county: West Sussex
- Region: South East
- Country: England
- Sovereign state: United Kingdom
- Police: Sussex
- Fire: West Sussex
- Ambulance: South East Coast
- UK Parliament: Arundel and South Downs

Sullington is a village and former civil parish, now in the parish of Storrington and Sullington, in the Horsham district of West Sussex, England. The village lies on the A283 road west of the A24 road, 20 miles (32 km) south of Horsham. In 1961 the parish had a population of 1354. On 1 April 2003 the parish was abolished and merged with Storrington to form "Storrington & Sullington".

St Mary's Parish Church nave dates back to Saxon times: the chancel and tower are from the 13th century and the church was restored in 1873. The patronage of the parish rested with the lord of the manor of Sullington until 1938, when Evelyn Palmer (Lady Caldecott) passed it to the Diocese of Chichester. The Victorian rectory (built c1845) was sold off as a private residence and later occupied by the writer A J Cronin and the politician Lady Cynthia Asquith. The modern rectory is on Washington Road.

Sullington Manor, on Sullington Lane, is a Grade II listed former farmhouse. The manor was held by the Shelley family from the dissolution of the monasteries (1546) until 1789, when it was sold to George Wyndham, 3rd Earl of Egremont.

A feature is Sullington Warren, which is a woodland area popular among visitors to Sullington.
