= Parham Park SSSI =

Protected area in West Sussex, England

Coordinates: 50.923°N 0.493°W

- Site of Special Scientific Interest
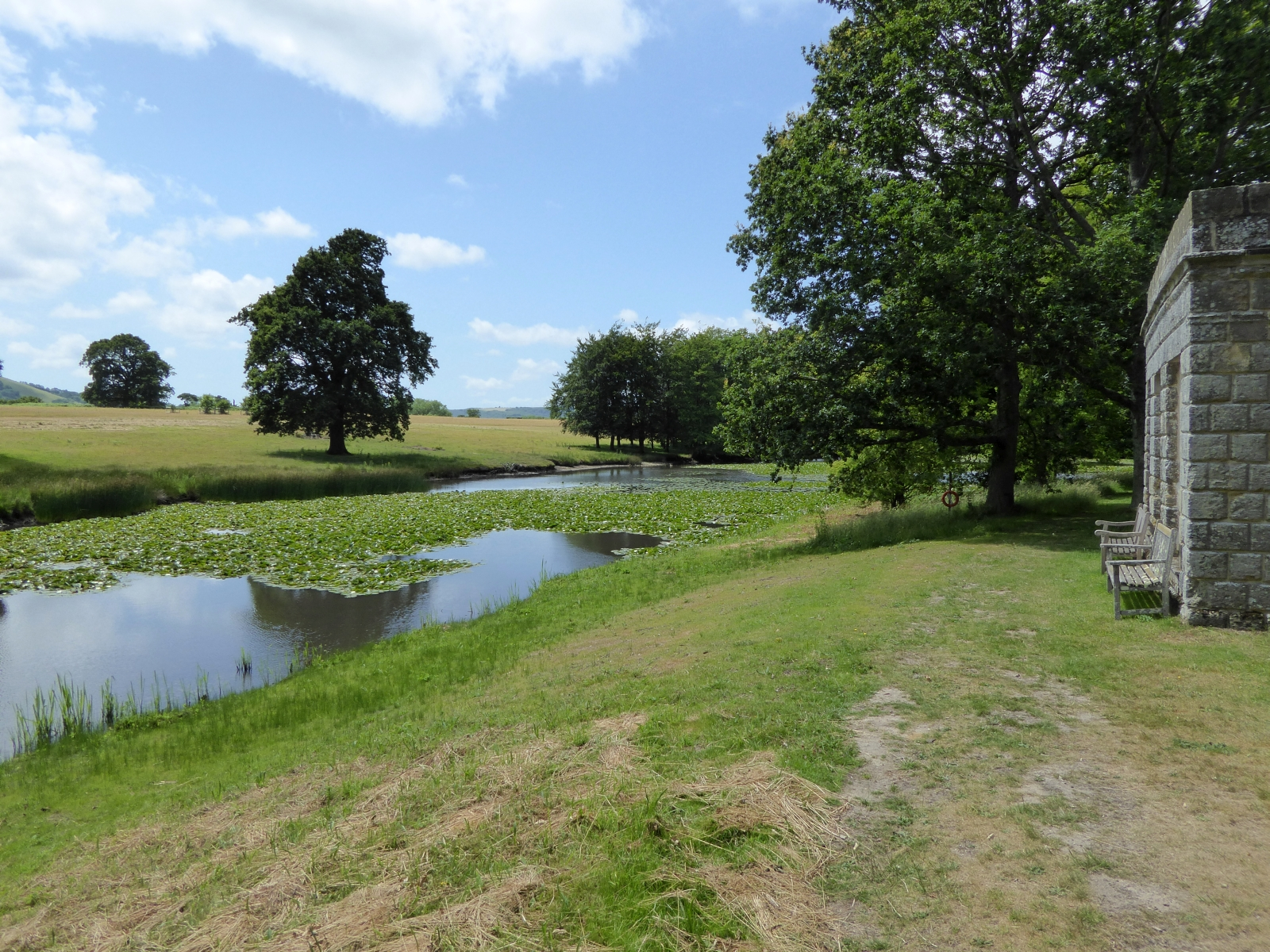
- Location of Parham Park SSSI.
- Area of search: West Sussex
- Grid reference: TQ 060 148
- Interest: Biological
- Area: 263.3 hectares (651 acres)
- Notification date: 1986
- Location map: Magic Map

Parham Park SSSI is a 263.3-hectare (651-acre) biological Site of Special Scientific Interest in the grounds of Parham Park, west of Storrington in West Sussex. It is a Nature Conservation Review site, Grade 2.

This medieval deer park has a very rich epiphytic lichen flora, with 165 recorded species. Habitats include woods, parkland, bogs and artificial ponds. The site also has a large heronry and two rare beetles, Ampedus cardinalis and Procraerus tibialis.

The house and grounds are open to the public for a fee.
