= Shrine of Our Lady of Consolation =

Catholic church in West Sussex, England

Coordinates: 50.977807°N 0.324482°W

- Shrine and Parish Church of Our Lady of Consolation and Saint Francis
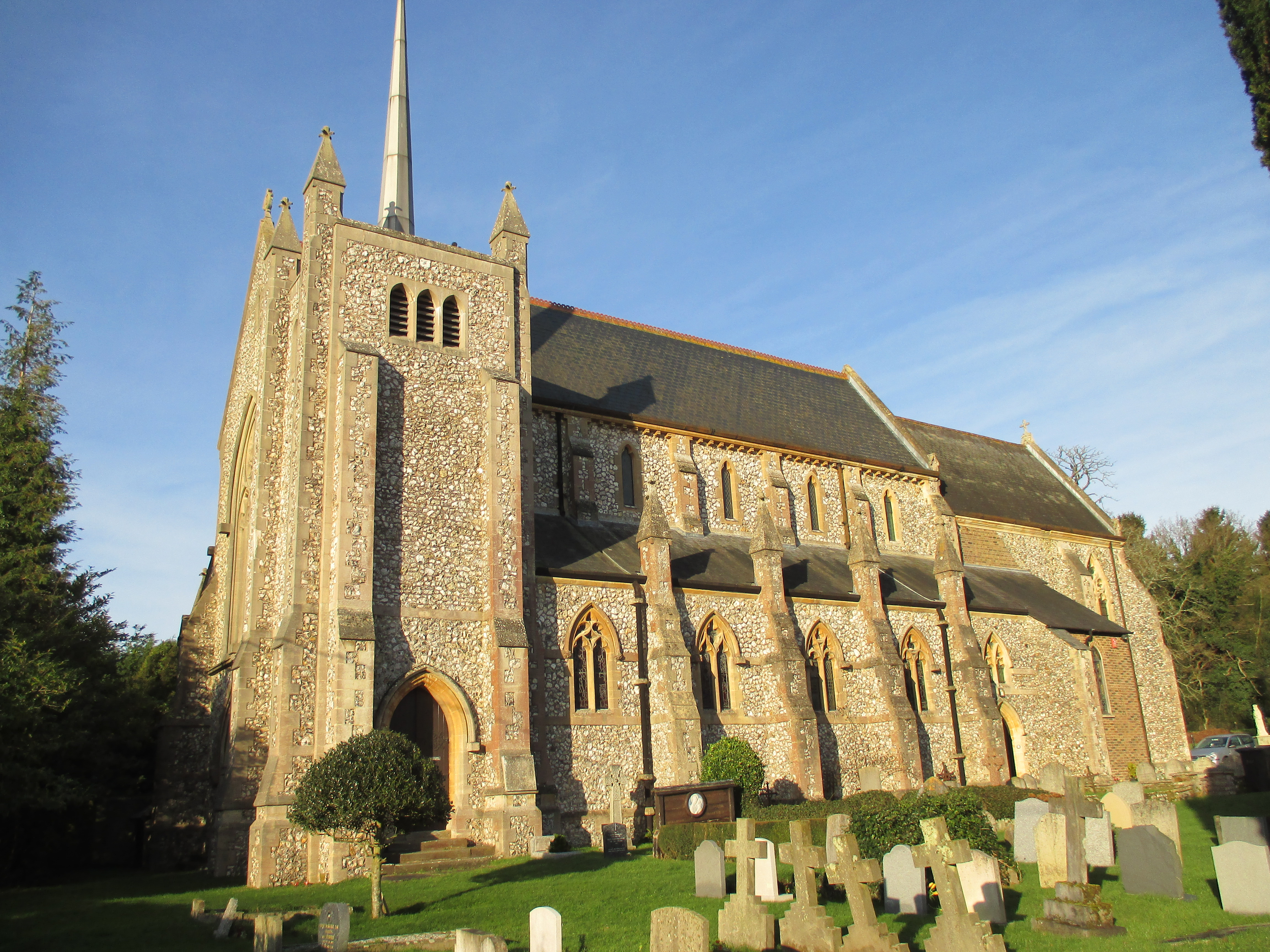

- Location in West Sussex
- Location: West Grinstead, West Sussex
- Country: England
- Denomination: Roman Catholic
- Website: Consolation.org.uk

History
- Status: Active
- Founder: Fr Jean-Marie Denis
- Dedication: Blessed Virgin Mary; Saint Francis of Assisi

Architecture
- Functional status: Parish church
- Heritage designation: Grade II listed
- Designated: 22 February 2007
- Architect: John Crawley (architect)
- Style: Gothic Revival
- Groundbreaking: 29 May 1875
- Completed: 27 June 1876

Administration
- Province: Southwark
- Diocese: Arundel and Brighton
- Deanery: Crawley

The Church of Our Lady of Consolation and Saint Francis is a Roman Catholic parish church and shrine in West Grinstead, in West Sussex. It was built from 1875 to 1876, with additions made to the church in 1896 and 1964.

The original church was designed by John Aloysius Crawley in 1875 and the latter additions were designed by Frederick Arthur Walters in 1896. It is situated on the corner of Steyning Road and Park Lane to the east of the A24 road. It is a Gothic Revival style church and a Grade II listed building.

The shrine is dedicated to the Blessed Virgin Mary under the venerated title of Our Lady of Consolation which merited a pontifical decree of coronation from Pope Leo XIII on 12 July 1893.

== History ==
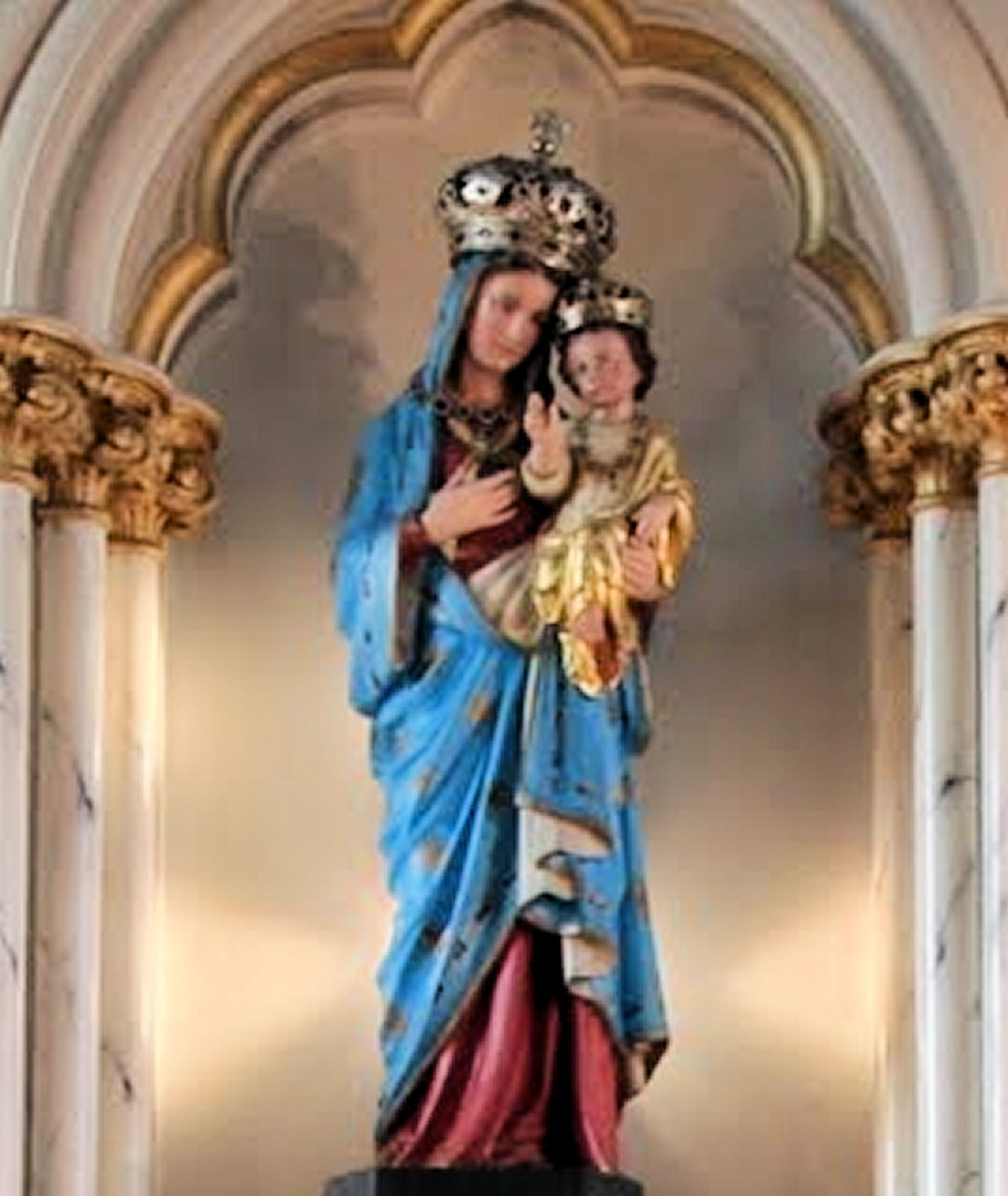
The venerated Marian image canonically crowned by Pope Leo XIII on 12 July 1893.

=== Origins ===
Before the Reformation, there was a shrine to the Blessed Virgin Mary in West Grinstead. After the Reformation, Catholic worship continued in the area. In the mid-1600s, John Caryll, 1st Baron Caryll of Durford bought West Grinstead Manor (demolished in 1964) and the manor's private chapel became the place of worship for local Catholics. It is recorded that in 1671, John Caryll provided £600 to accommodate one priest and support two others. The house became the presbytery of the mission and later of the parish. In 1685, sixteen Catholics were recorded as living in the area. Between 1710 and 1754, the West Grinstead mission was served by the Jesuits. In 1758, John Baptist Caryll, 3rd Baron Caryll of Durford, with mounting costs as a recusant landowner, had to sell West Grinstead Manor. After the house was sold, Edward Caryll gave the presbytery to the priests and endowed the mission with £1,300. From 1758 until 1815, from that house Franciscans served the local Catholics in the area.

=== Foundation ===
In 1863, the local Catholic mission was revived when a French priest, Jean-Marie Denis was appointed to serve the Catholic population in the area. As well as founding the church, he also reopened the school (which later became an orphanage), and built St Juliana's Priory next to the church.

Denis was asked by the Bishop of Southwark to build a 'miniature French cathedral'. An appeal for funds spread to France, Belgium and the Netherlands. On 29 May 1875, the foundation stone of the church was laid.

=== Priory ===
The priory was built in 1869 and housed 36 nuns. In 1871, Dominican Sisters moved into the priory and started a refuge for girls. Eventually the orphanage and refuge merged. In 1903, it was called St Joseph's and from 1909 to 1922, it became St Mary's, before closing by 1933. From 1935, the premises were occupied by the St Thomas More School, a Catholic school for boys run by the Presentation Brothers. The brothers left in 1977, the school closed in 1984 and the building was later demolished.

=== Construction ===
The church was designed by John A. Crawley who was also the architect of the Church of the Sacred Heart in Hove. On 27 June 1876, the church was opened. At that stage it consisted of the nave and aisles. Crawley's original plan for the church included transepts, a choir for the nuns, and a tower with spire. However, Crawley died in 1881 and did not see the rest of his plans finished.

From 1880 onwards, annual pilgrimages were made every July from the diocese's cathedral in Southwark. However, from 1965, the Diocese of Arundel and Brighton was formed from the Archdiocese of Southwark from then separate pilgrimages were made by parishes, groups and individuals from the new diocese. From 1887 to 1889, Francis Bourne was curate at the church. He later became Archbishop of Westminster and a cardinal.

In 1896, under the direction of the architect Frederick Walters, the sanctuary, side chapels and bell turret were added to the church. The aisles were also raised. The church was re-opened on 14 July 1896.

=== Additions ===
In 1953, the writer and historian Hilaire Belloc died and was buried in the shrine church. He was a regular attendee at Mass in the parish. In 1964, in memory of his death, the tower was built. Construction work was supervised by the architectural firm Riley & Glanfield.

On 31 October 2012, the philanthropist Nona Byrne died. She was also buried in the church.

== Gallery ==
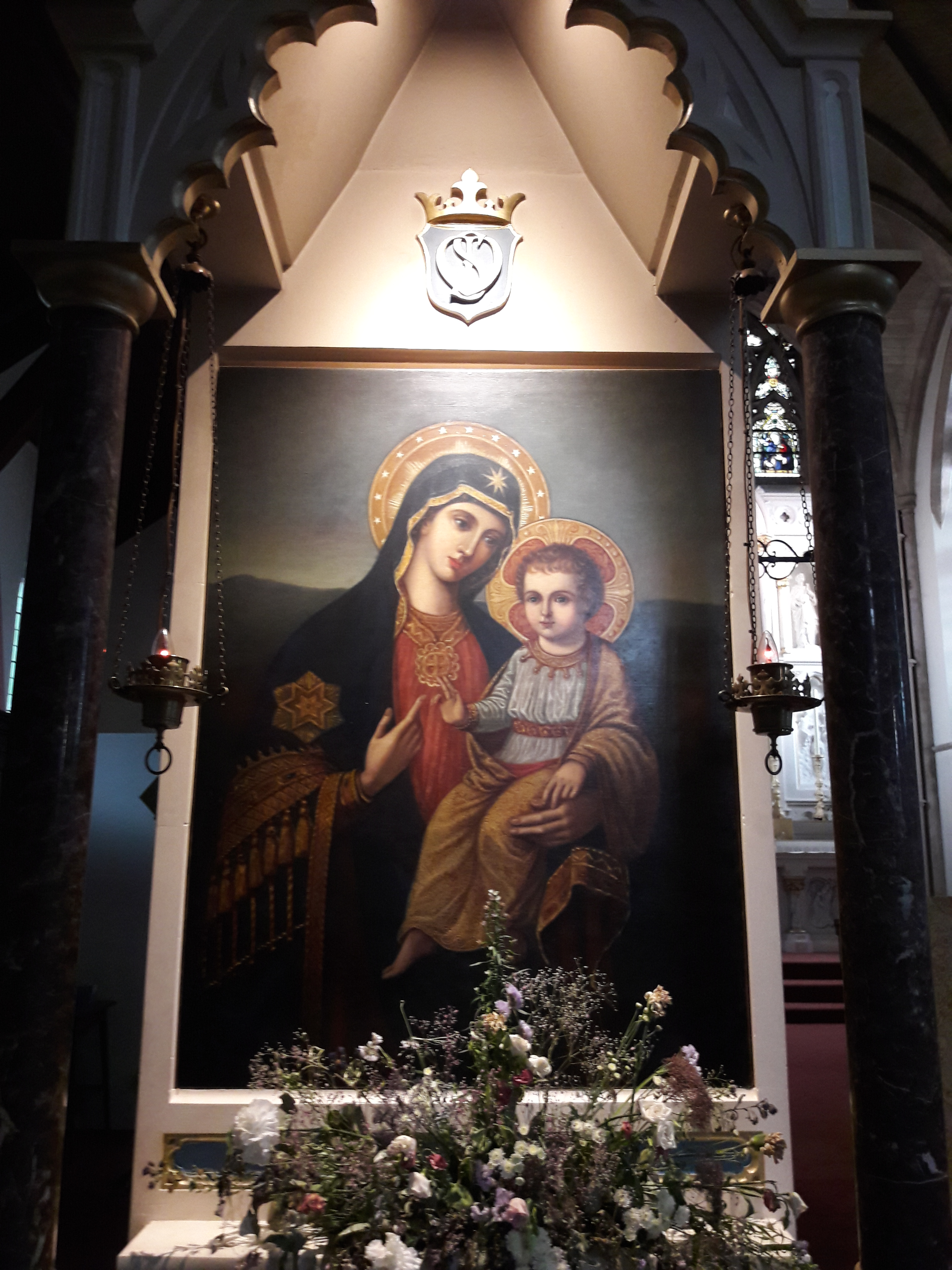
Our Lady of Consolation painting

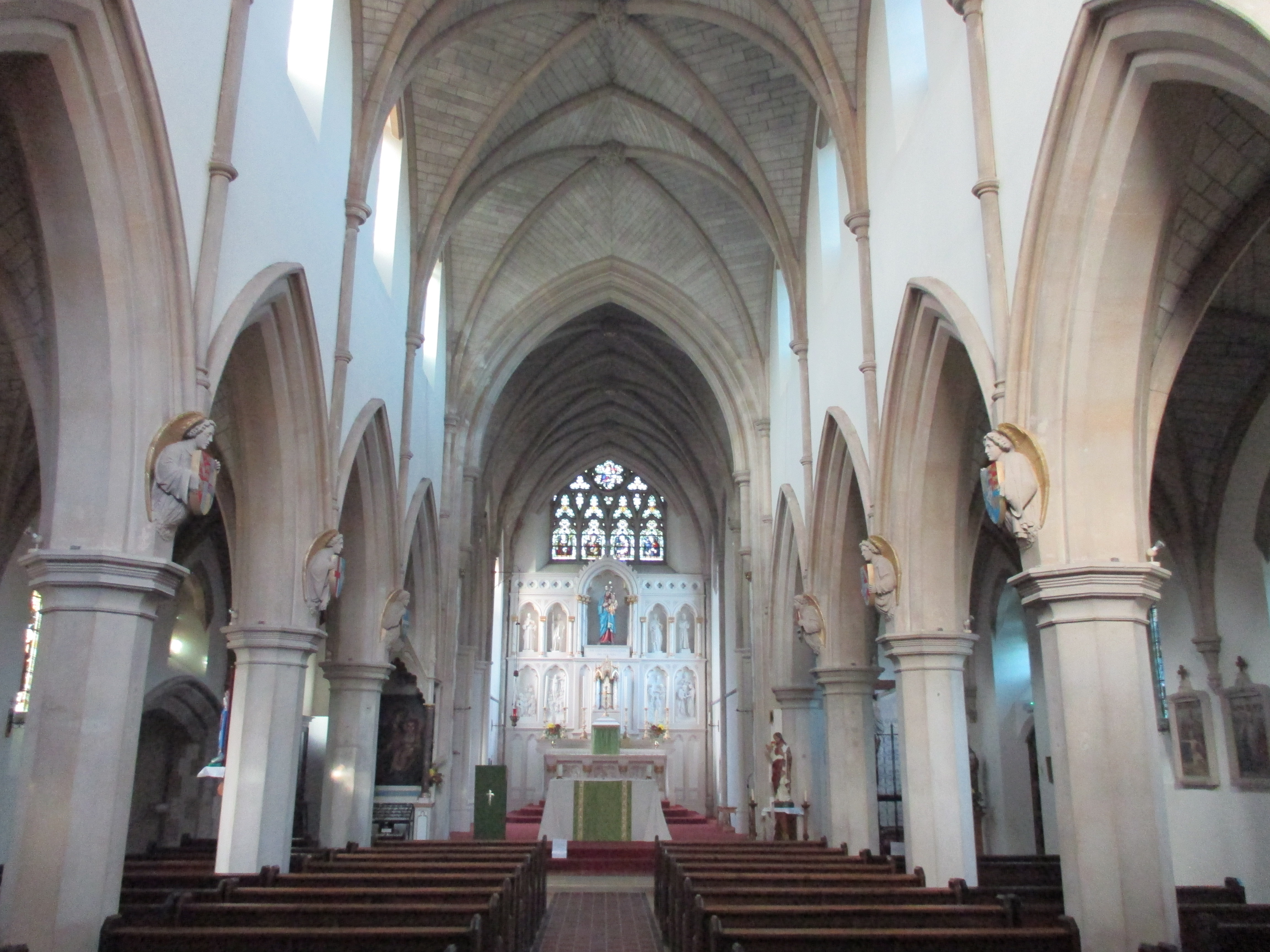
Church interior

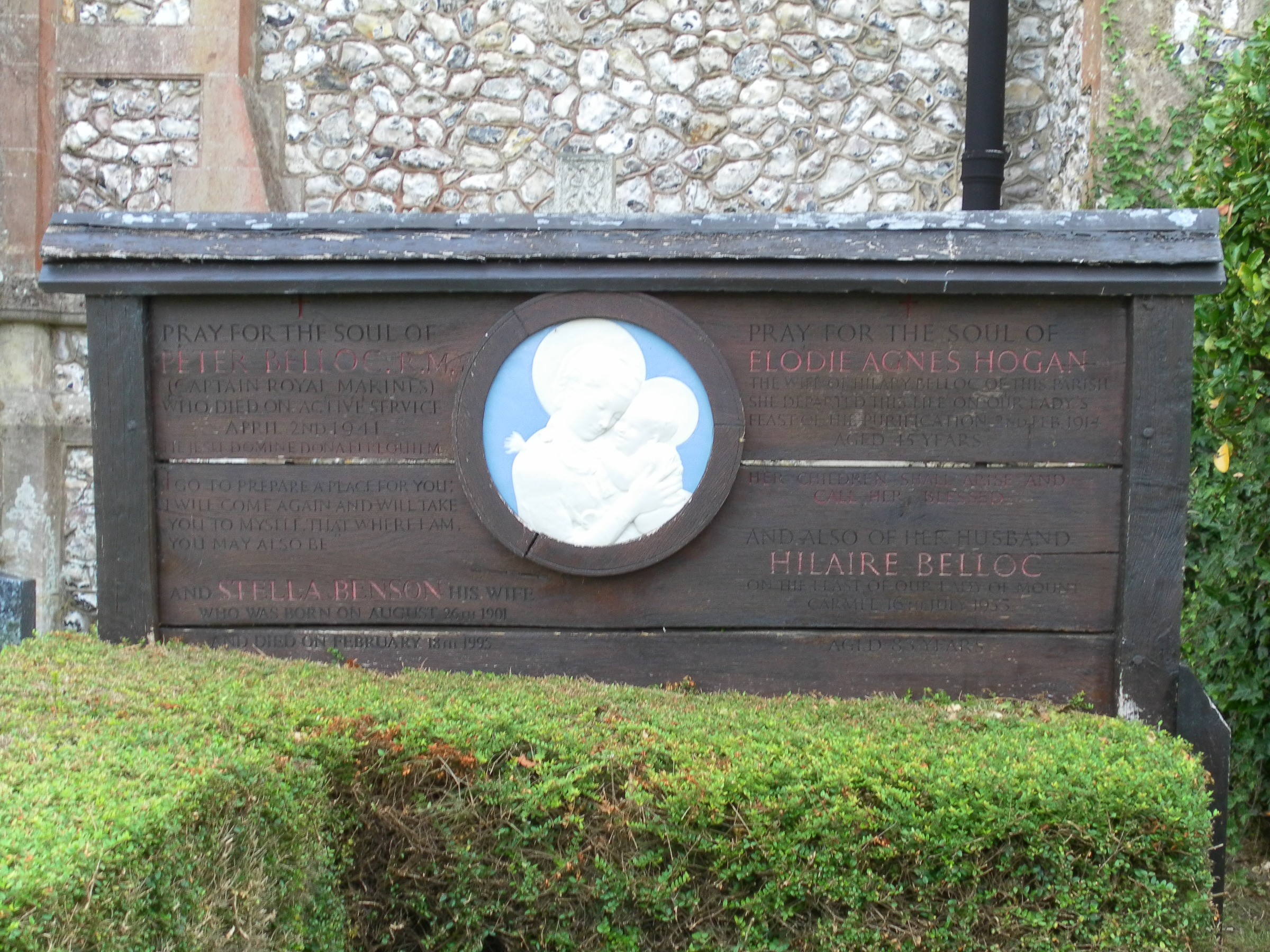
Hilaire Belloc's grave

== Parish ==
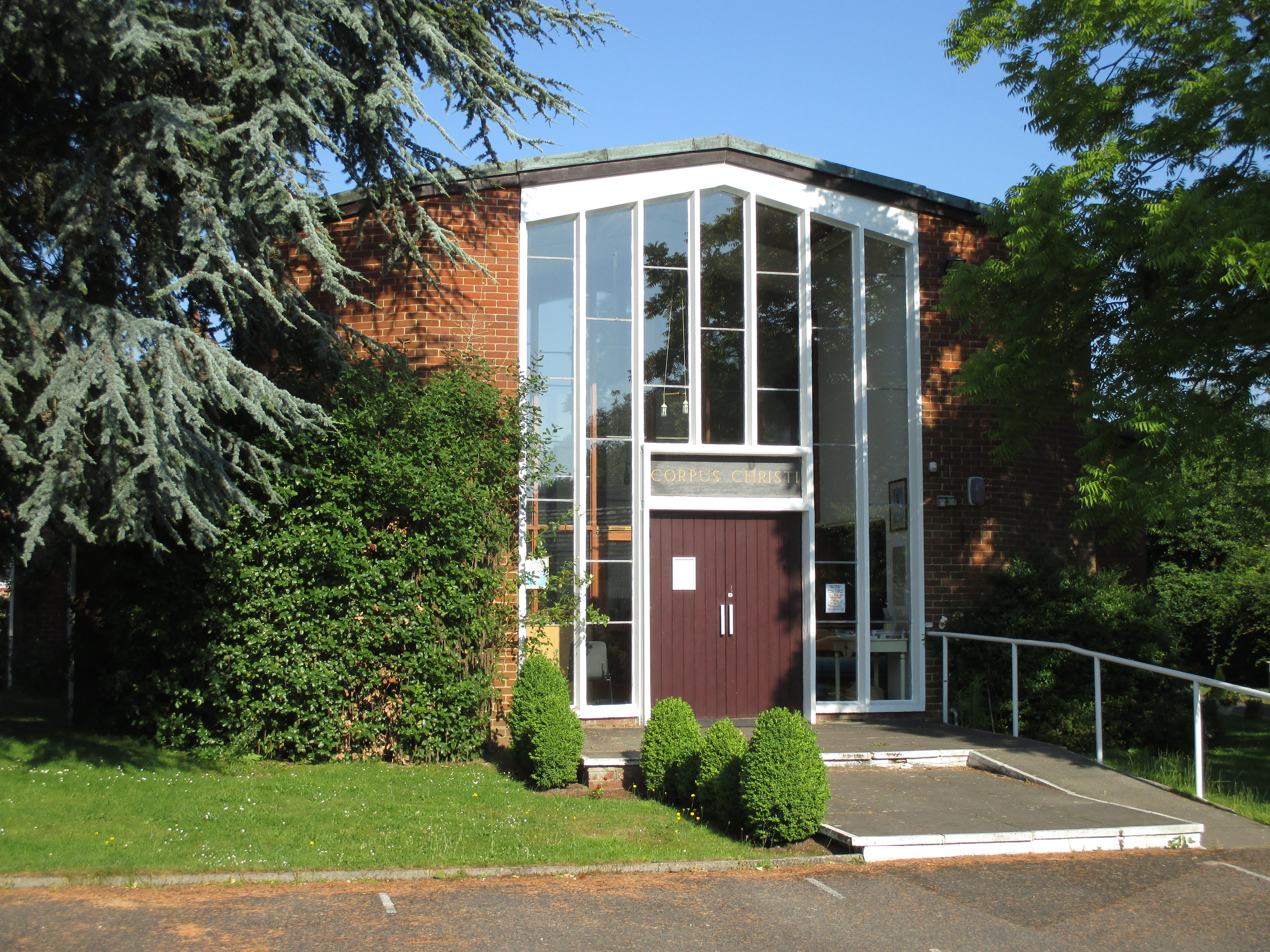
Corpus Christi Church, Henfield, part of the same parish as the shrine church

Within the parish is the only post-Reformation Carthusian monastery in the United Kingdom, St. Hugh's Charterhouse, Parkminster.

The shrine church has Mass at 6:00pm on Saturday evening and at 10:30am on Sunday. The parish of Corpus Christi Church in Henfield is served from West Grinstead and it has Sunday Mass at 9:00am.

== See also ==
- List of places of worship in Horsham District
- History of Christianity in Sussex
- Roman Catholic Diocese of Arundel and Brighton
