= Catholic Building Society =

Former UK building society

- Type: Building Society (Mutual)
- Industry: Banking; Financial services
- Founded: 1960
- Headquarters: London, England, UK
- Products: Savings, Mortgages, Investments, Loans, Insurance
- Net income: £122,000 GBP (December 2007), 4.7% on 2006
- Total assets: £44.1 million GBP (December 2007), 10.3% on 2006
- Website: www.catholicbs.co.uk

The Catholic Building Society was a UK building society based in Westminster, London. It was the 57th largest in the United Kingdom based on total assets of £44 million at 31 December 2007.

== History ==
The Society was started by Vincent Byrne and the Hon. Nona Byrne, in 1960. It started at 49 Harrington Road, Kensington; in 1966 it moved to Great Peter Street, Westminster, sharing the Westminster diocesan offices, under the patronage of Canon Adrian Arrowsmith. From 1972, the Society was based in Strutton Ground, moving between buildings on that street until settling at 7 Strutton Ground in 1993.

The society prided itself on making affordable home loans available to people with lower than average incomes, giving a high proportion of its home loans to single women.

The Catholic Building Society was acquired by the Chelsea Building Society in December 2008.
