= Cootham =

Hamlet in West Sussex, England

Coordinates: 50.92053°N 0.47258°W

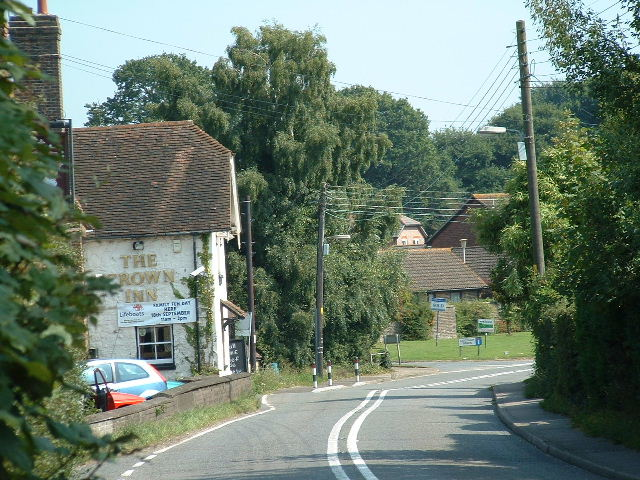

- Location within West Sussex
- OS grid reference: TQ074145
- Civil parish: Storrington and Sullington
- District: Horsham
- Shire county: West Sussex
- Region: South East
- Country: England
- Sovereign state: United Kingdom
- Police: Sussex
- Fire: West Sussex
- Ambulance: South East Coast
- UK Parliament: Arundel and South Downs

Cootham (/ˈkoʊtəm/ KOHT-əm, /ˈkuːt-/ KOOT-) is a village in the Horsham District of West Sussex, England. It lies on the A283 road 0.9 miles (1.4 km) west of Storrington.

Items of local interest include the Southdown Gliding Club which operates flights from Parham Airfield at the western extremity of Cootham; Cootham Village Hall which hosts various local community activities and Parham House itself, one of the south east's finest country houses.

== Population ==
Cootham's population numbers around 270 and there is one public house named The Crown, parts of which date from 1555. As a well known coaching inn 'The Crown' had its own stables. They were situated on the south side of the road opposite the pub and were converted, some years ago, into houses that are known today as Crown Cottages.

== Geography ==
The hamlet lies in the lee of the South Downs, between the country estate of Parham (included in the Domesday Book) and the village of Storrington, where the nearest facilities are located. The main road running through the middle of Cootham is the A283 that runs west to Pulborough and Midhurst and east to Storrington and Washington.

== Trasportation ==
Public transport is limited to one bus, Compass Travel route 100, that runs to Pulborough railway station on the Bognor Regis to London Victoria line.

== History ==
In the 1980s, oil was discovered beneath a large part of Cootham and a small pumping station was constructed at the corner of the gliding field. This is still operational and features two 'nodding donkey' pumps and a gas burner. Much of the area surrounding Cootham is protected from development, though housing has encroached significantly since the late 1980s and there is now little untouched land between Cootham and Storrington.
