= Storrington and Sullington =

Civil parish in West Sussex, England

Coordinates: 50.9171°N 0.45575°W

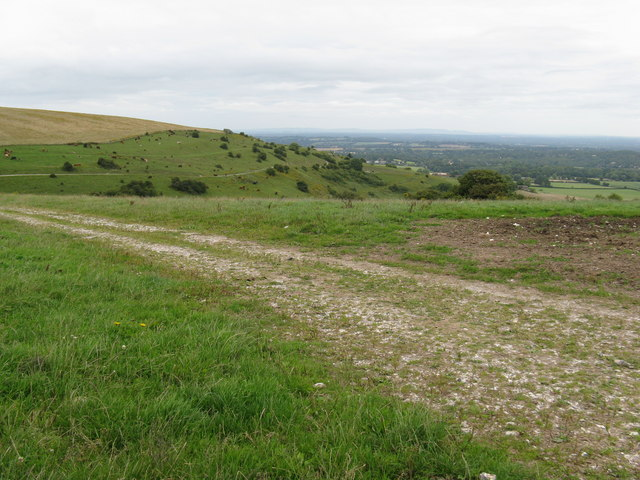
- Sullington Hill, Storrington

- Location within West Sussex
- Area: 12.00 km^{2} (4.63 sq mi)
- Population: 6,074 2001 Census; 6,966 (2011 Census)
  - Density: 506/km^{2} (1,310/sq mi)
- OS grid reference: TQ086142
  - London: 43 miles (69 km) NNE
- Civil parish: Storrington and Sullington
- District: Horsham
- Shire county: West Sussex
- Region: South East
- Country: England
- Sovereign state: United Kingdom
- Post town: PULBOROUGH
- Postcode district: RH20
- Dialling code: 01903
- Police: Sussex
- Fire: West Sussex
- Ambulance: South East Coast
- UK Parliament: Arundel and South Downs
- Website: http://www.storrington.org.uk/

Storrington and Sullington is a civil parish in the Horsham District of West Sussex, England. The parish covers the town of Storrington and the villages of Sullington and Cootham.

The civil parish has a land area of 1,200 hectares (3,000 acres). In the 2001 census 6074 people lived in 2778 households of whom 2563 were economically active. At the 2011 Census the population had increased to 6,966. In 2018 there was a recorded 8,955 people living in the Storrington area.
