= Parham Park =

Elizabethan house in Parham, West Sussex, England

Parham House & Gardens
- Site of Special Scientific Interest
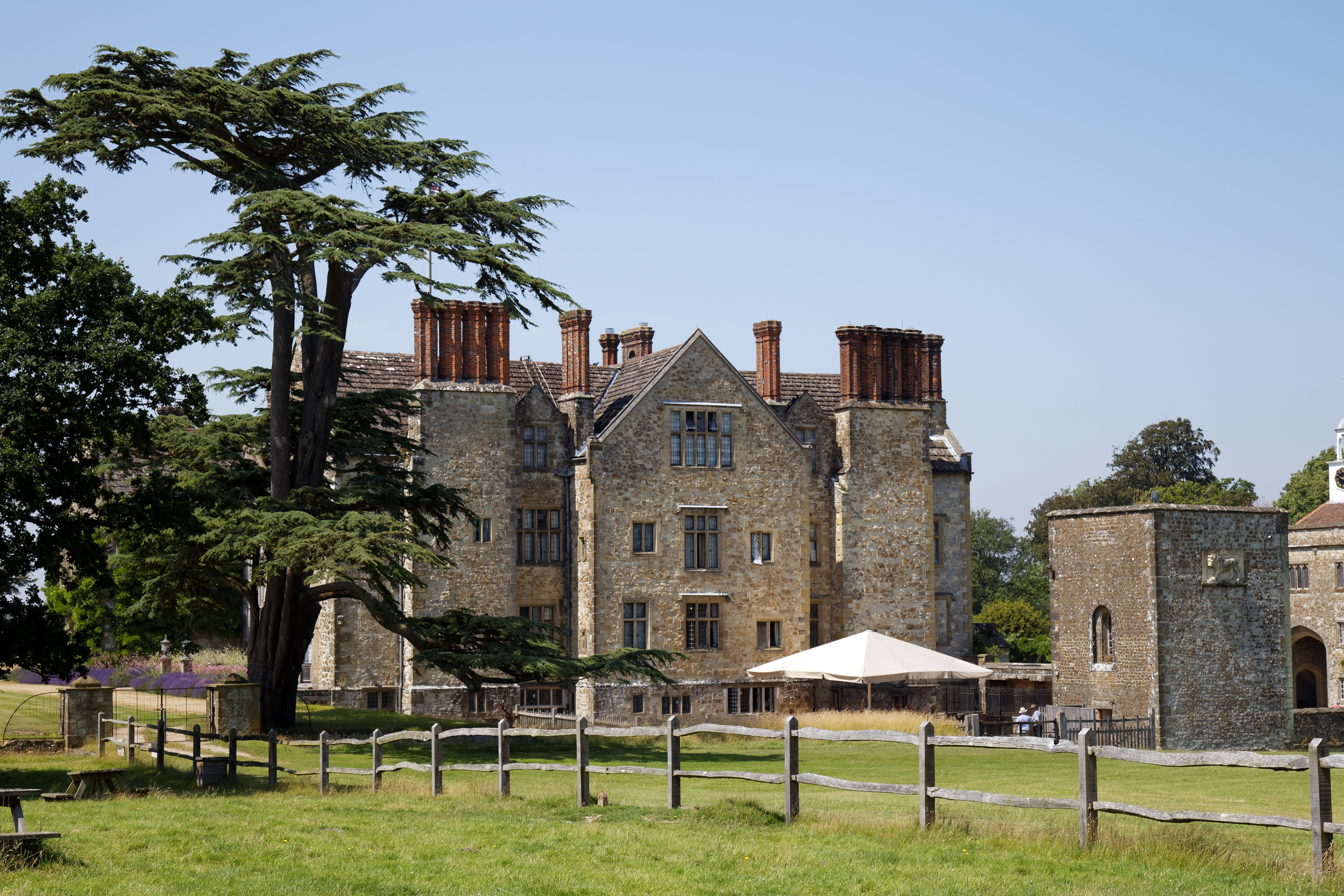
- Parham House east front
- Location of Parham House & Gardens.
- Area of search: West Sussex
- Grid reference: TQ059148
- Coordinates: 50.922817°N 0.492407°W
- Interest: Biological
- Area: 263.4 ha (651 acres)
- Notification date: 1965

Parham House & Gardens is an Elizabethan house and estate in the civil parish of Parham, west of the village of Cootham, and between Storrington and Pulborough, West Sussex, South East England. The estate was originally owned by Westminster Abbey and granted to Robert Palmer by King Henry VIII in 1540.

== History ==
The foundation stone was laid in 1577 by the 2-year-old Thomas Palmer, and Parham has been a family home ever since. Thomas Bishopp (later Sir Thomas Bishopp, 1st Baronet) bought Parham House in 1601. For over 300 years his descendants continued to live at Parham House Estate until January 1922. Then in 1922 Bernard Clive Pearson, younger son of Weetman Pearson, 1st Viscount Cowdray, bought Parham from Mary, 17th Baroness Zouche.

Bernard Clive Pearson and his wife Alicia opened the house to visitors in 1948, after the Second World War when it had also been home to evacuee children and Canadian soldiers. It was one of the first private houses in England to open formally to visitors.

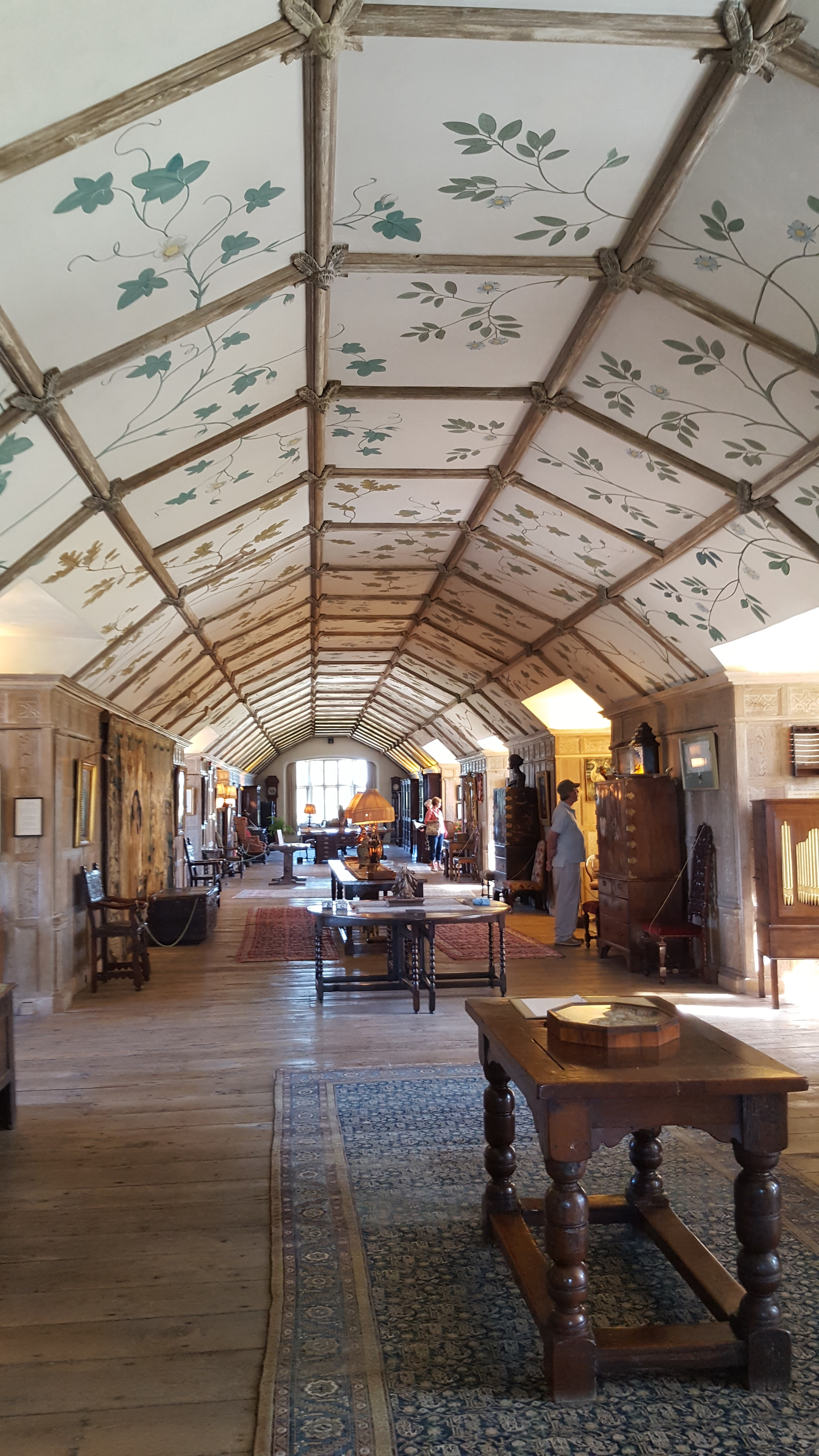
The Long Gallery

Off the Long Gallery at the top of the house there is an exhibition which touches on the period between 1922 and 1948, with many family photographs as well as photographs of the building works which took place during that time.

Mr and Mrs Pearson, followed by their daughter Veronica Mary Tritton (died 1993), spent more than 60 years restoring Parham and filling it with a collection of period furniture, paintings and textiles, also acquiring items that had originally belonged to the house. There is a particularly important collection of early needlework, including bed hangings supposed to have been worked by Mary, Queen of Scots.

During the Second World War, from 1939 the house was home to 30 children evacuated from Peckham in London. In June 1942, the War Office requisitioned the house and estate, relocating the evacuees to make way for the 1st, 2nd and 3rd Canadian Divisions. After the Second World War, the house was opened to the public.

Lady Emma Barnard, the daughter of Benjamin Guinness, 3rd Earl of Iveagh, inherited the house from Mrs Tritton, who was her great-aunt, and lives in one wing with her family. Now owned by a charitable trust, Parham House and Gardens are surrounded by 875 acres (3.54 km^{2}) of working agricultural and forestry land.

The radical reformer Henry 'Orator' Hunt was buried on Saturday 21 February 1835 in the churchyard of St Peter's Church in Parham Park. The Times published a lengthy report of the funeral.

== Deer park ==
Around the house stretches 300 acres (1.2 km^{2}) of ancient deer park whose Fallow Deer are descendants of the original herd first recorded in 1628. Parham Park SSSI is a Site of Special Scientific Interest. It has special biological interest for its epiphytic lichen flora, as an area for two rare beetles and its large heronry.

== Eighteenth-century smuggling ==
Parham House had connections with an infamous smuggling raid on the Customs House at Poole in 1747 by the notorious Hawkhurst Gang. The body of one of the other smugglers was later found in the pond of the Parham House estate after being dumped there some 12 miles from where he had been beaten to death by his accomplices.

== Film location ==
The 1995 film Haunted by British director Lewis Gilbert was filmed extensively at Parham. It is based on a novel of the same name by James Herbert, who had strong connections to Sussex, residing at the time of his March 2013 death in Woodmancote, West Sussex.
