= Nona Byrne =

British philanthropist

The Honourable Nona Georgette Byrne DSG (10 September 1922 – 31 October 2012), née Nona Georgette Lawrence, was a British Roman Catholic philanthropist. In 1960, with her husband Vincent Byrne, she founded the Catholic Building Society, becoming the first woman to be elected chairman of a building society.

== Early life and family ==
Nona Lawrence was the sixth and youngest child of Alexander Graham Lawrence, 3rd Baron Lawrence and his first wife Dorothy Hobson CBE. Born in Greenford, Middlesex, Nona was educated at the Francis Holland School, then at Lymington, where she was Head Girl. During the war, she served in the Women's Land Army at Hever Castle, then as a nurse in Brighton.

Nona Lawrence married Wing Commander Vincent Byrne on 8 February 1945, converting to Roman Catholicism. The couple went on to have nine children, and at the time of Nona's death had twenty five grandchildren and eleven great-grandchildren.

== Career and later life ==
The Byrnes became active philanthropists in London and Sussex, assisting war widows and refugees, often in partnership with the Catholic church. In 1955, they gave the use of a rented house in Redburn Street, Chelsea, as a home for war widows, and helped Leonard Cheshire found St Bridget's Cheshire Home at East Preston, West Sussex. The following year they took over Gerston House, Storrington, West Sussex, a former residence of the Bishop of Arundel, as a refugee home.

In 1960, they founded the Catholic Building Society to assist people on low incomes, including lone women. In 1972, Nona Byrne became Chairman of the Society, the first woman to chair a building society and the first woman to address the Building Societies Association.

Nona was a firm defender of the role of building societies, criticising government policies that she saw as diverting savings or undermining life assurance.

Nona Byrne retired from the board of the Catholic Building Society at its AGM in April 1997. At the same time, she was made a Dame of the papal Order of St. Gregory the Great, presented by the Auxiliary Bishop of Westminster, Patrick O'Donoghue.

Nona Byrne died at home in Chichester on 31 October 2012, and was buried at Our Lady of Consolation, West Grinstead.
