= Pulborough Brooks =

Coordinates: 50.943°N 0.503°W

- Site of Special Scientific Interest
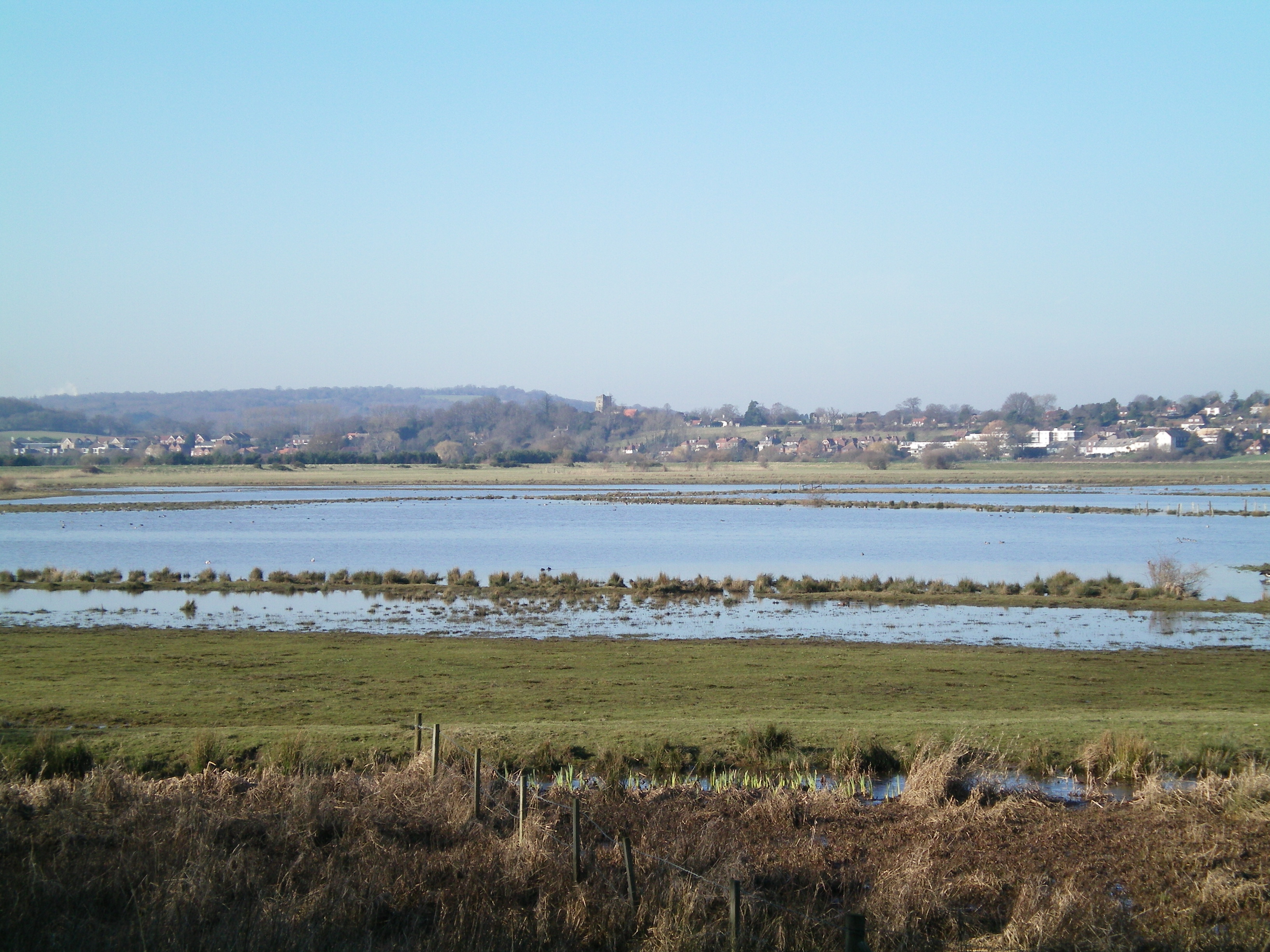
- Location of Pulborough Brooks.
- Area of search: West Sussex
- Grid reference: TQ 053 170
- Interest: Biological
- Area: 160.0 hectares (395 acres)
- Notification date: 1998
- Location map: Magic Map

Pulborough Brooks is a 160-hectare (400-acre) biological Site of Special Scientific Interest south of Pulborough in West Sussex. It is part of the Pulborough Brooks nature reserve, which is owned and managed by the Royal Society for the Protection of Birds. It is also part of the Arun Valley Ramsar site, Special Area of Conservation and Special Protection Area.

These wet meadows are crossed by a network of ditches, some of which have a rich aquatic flora and invertebrate fauna, including several which are nationally rare. The site is internationally important for wintering wildfowl and many species of birds breed there, such as lapwing, snipe, garganey, yellow wagtail, grey partridge, skylark, reed bunting and barn owl. Dragonflies, damselflies and glowworms are also to be found there.
