= Storrington =

Town in West Sussex, England

Coordinates: 50.91776°N 0.45459°W

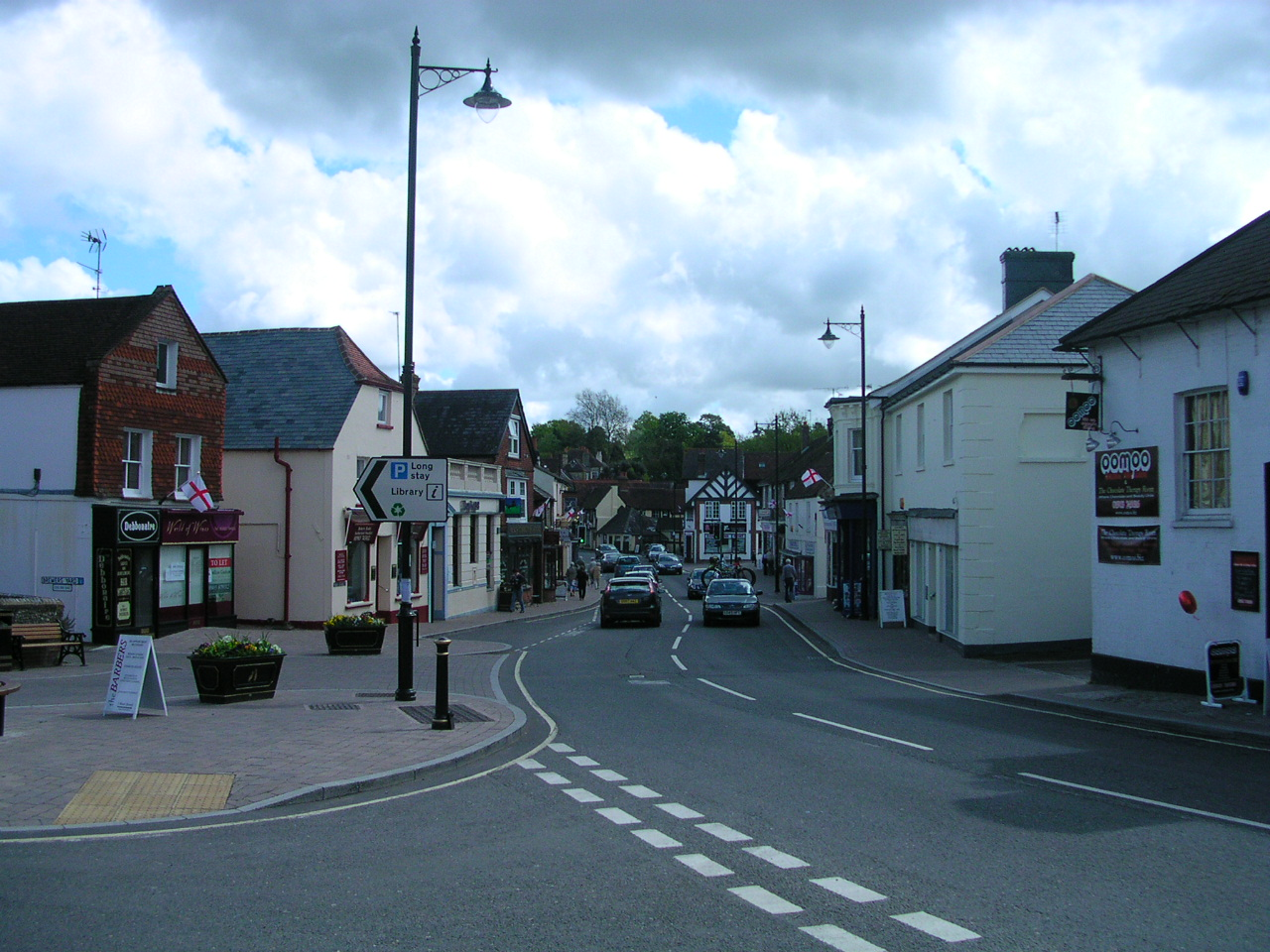

- Location within West Sussex
- OS grid reference: TQ087142
- Civil parish: Storrington and Sullington
- District: Horsham
- Shire county: West Sussex
- Region: South East
- Country: England
- Sovereign state: United Kingdom
- Post town: PULBOROUGH
- Postcode district: RH20
- Dialling code: 01903
- Police: Sussex
- Fire: West Sussex
- Ambulance: South East Coast
- UK Parliament: Arundel and South Downs

Storrington is a town and former civil parish, now in the parish of Storrington and Sullington, in the Horsham district of West Sussex, England. Storrington lies at the foot of the north side of the South Downs. As of 2021 it had a population of around 6,000. It has one main shopping street (High Street). The A283 road runs directly through the town and connects Storrington to Steyning in the east and Pulborough in the west. It is three miles (five kilometres) west of Washington.

== History ==
Storrington is listed in the Domesday Book as "Estorchestone", meaning a place well known for storks. A charter to hold a regular market on Wednesdays was granted by Henry IV in 1400, together with permissions for three fairs during the year, on Mayday, Wednesday of Whit week and the Feast of Martin on 11 November. Tanning and blacksmithing were also important industries and only in the 20th century did these roles fade away. Rabbit breeding was another significant industry reflected in a number of local place names including 'The Warren', 'Warren Hill', 'Sullington Warren' and 'Warren Croft'. This working/small industry background has however, left little behind architecturally. Nikolaus Pevsner, noted only the small door in Browns Lane, the church, and the Dominican convent known as the Abbey to be historically significant.

The Cinema Museum, London holds home movies of Storrington from 1950.

In 1961 the parish had a population of 2784. On 1 April 2003 the parish was abolished and merged with Sullington to form "Storrington & Sullington".

== Community ==
Since 1945 Storrington has expanded with a variety of housing projects which enlarged the village. It is possible to be in open countryside in a few minutes from the town centre when walking towards the downs or one of the commons.

The nearest towns are Worthing, approximately 10 mi (16 km) to the south, followed by Horsham, approximately 13 mi (21 km) to the north. The nearest train stations are at Pulborough and Amberley. Current public transport provision consists of two hourly bus routes: the 1 between Worthing and Midhurst (operated by Stagecoach South), and the 100 between Burgess Hill and Pulborough (operated by Compass Travel), both stopping at the bus station outside of Waitrose.

From the town centre there is walking access to the 100-mile-long (160-kilometre) trail, the South Downs Way. From Chantry Hill or Kithurst Hill there are views across the English Channel to the south and opposite, to the North Downs. On a clear day you can see the Isle of Wight.

Kithurst Hill which rises steeply above the village is marked at the summit by a trig point, 699 feet (213 metres) above sea level.

=== Sport and leisure ===
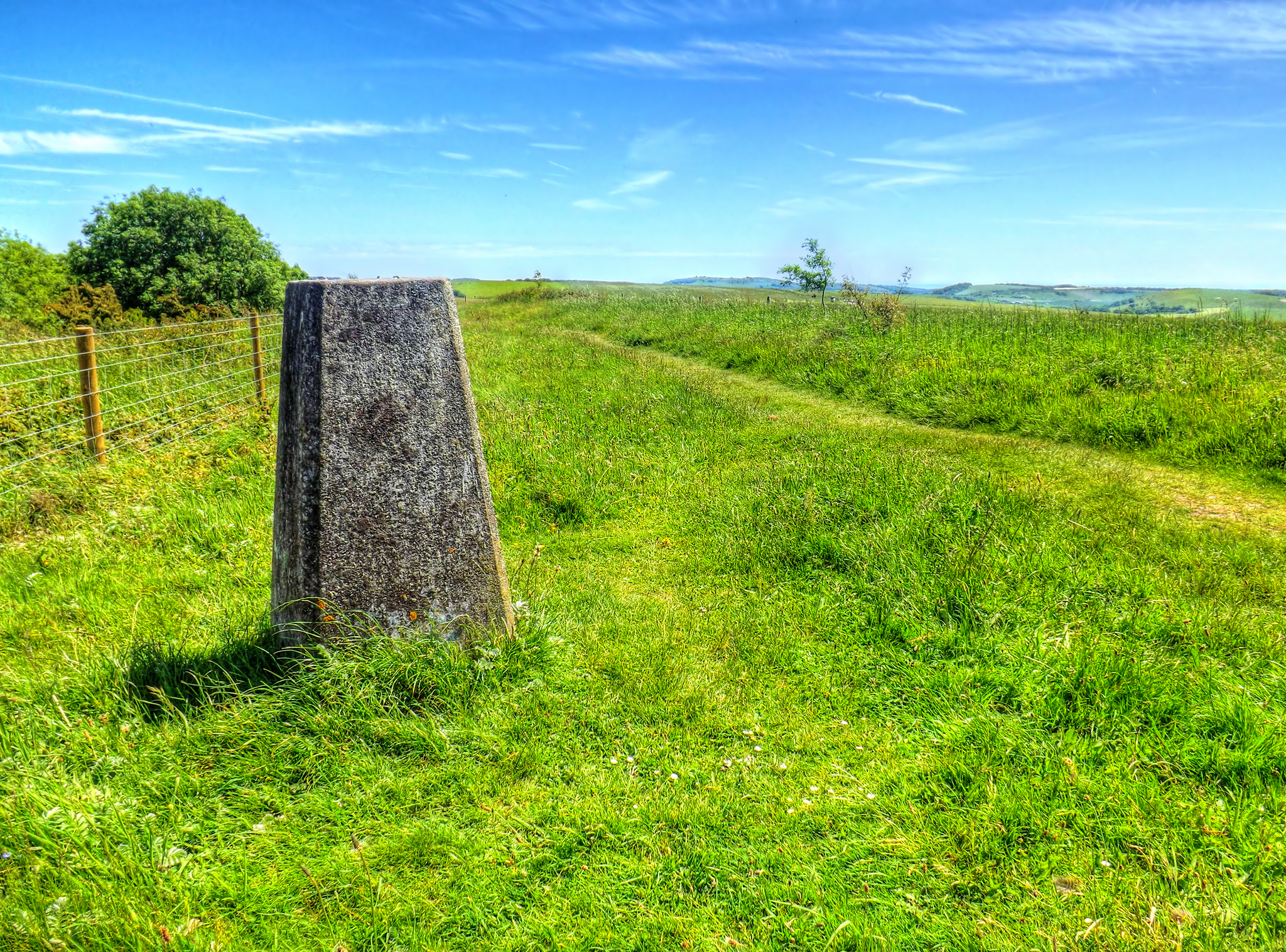
Trig Point Kithurst Hill

Sport and leisure facilities include a recreation ground with football and cricket pitches and a leisure centre. Storrington has a Non-League football club Storrington F.C., who play at the recreation ground.

Storrington is thinly disguised as the home of the home team in Hugh de Sélincourt's 1924 novel The Cricket Match, complete with chestnut trees and duck pond. In later editions a cartoon map of the town is used as end pages. John Parker wrote what was effectively a sequel in The Village Cricket Match in 1977.

== Landmarks ==
St Joseph's Hall in Greyfriars Lane is a Grade II listed former residence of the Bishop of Arundel and Brighton. It was built as a private house for US businessman George Trotter in 1910, and then sold to a French religious order, the Norbertines. In 1956 it was used by Vincent and Nona Byrne as a home for refugees from the Hungarian uprising.

Parham Park, towards Pulborough, is a country house with rolling parkland with a large herd of maintained deer. It is open most weekends to visitors. There is also the private Edwin Lutyens built Little Thakeham nearby.

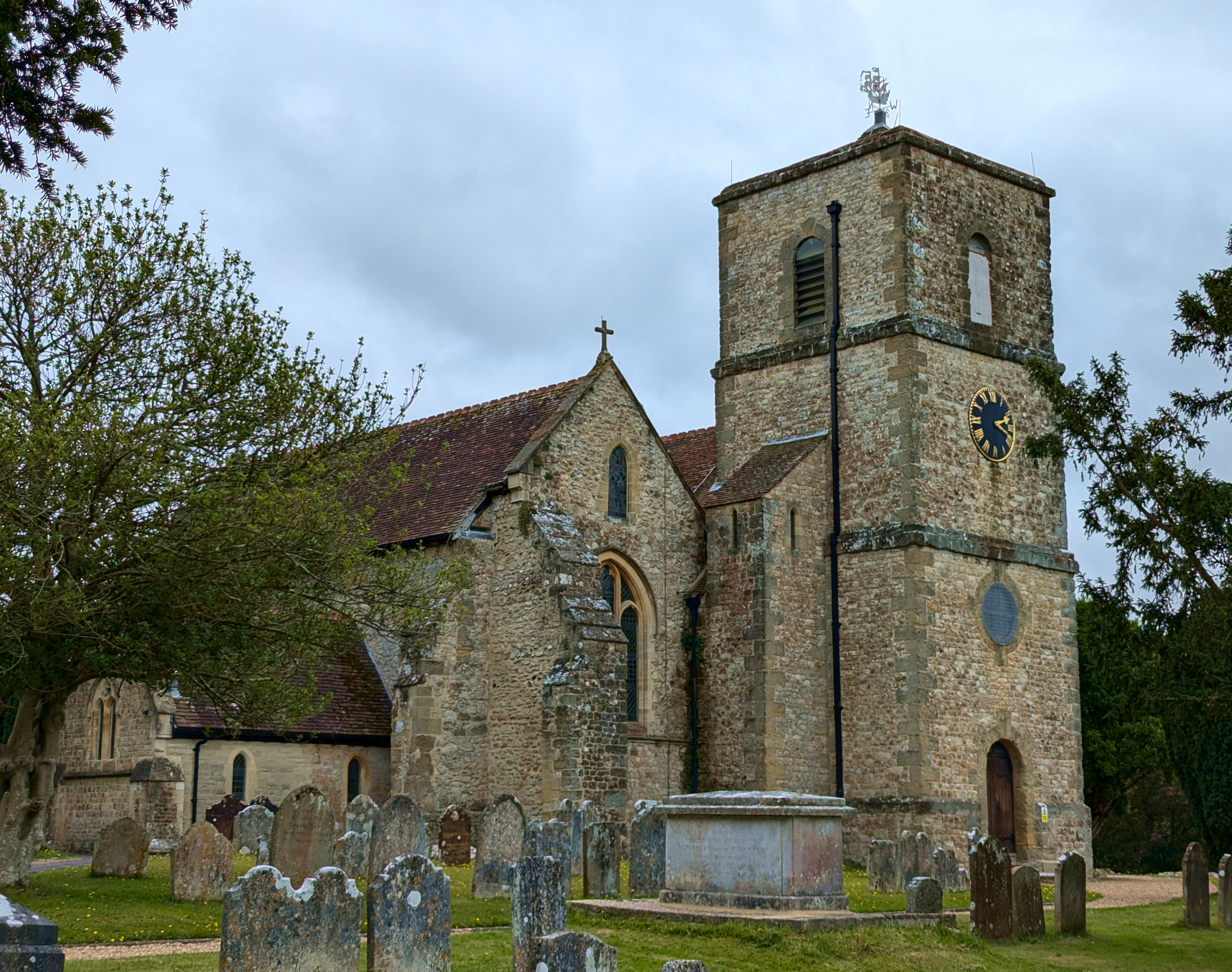
St. Mary's, Church of England parish church, at Storrington, West Sussex, England. The oldest parts of it date from C11, with alterations in C13, additions in C15 and rebuilding and extension in C19.

Places of worship include St Mary's on Church Street, which is the main Church of England place of worship, and the Priory of Our Lady of England on Monastery Lane, which is the Roman Catholic parish church of Storrington. The Roman Catholic bishops of Arundel lived nearby for a while. Other Christian denominations have places as well, including the Methodists and Jehovah's Witnesses.

== Twinning ==
Storrington is twinned with the commune of Villerest in the Loire department of central France.
