= St. Richard's Church =

St. Richard's Church may refer to:

United Kingdom
St Richard of Chichester Church, Chichester, West Sussex
St Richard's Church, Ham
St Richard's Church, Haywards Heath

United States

- St. Richard's Catholic Church, Bald Knob, Arkansas; listed on the National Register of Historic Places
