= List of places of worship in Mid Sussex =

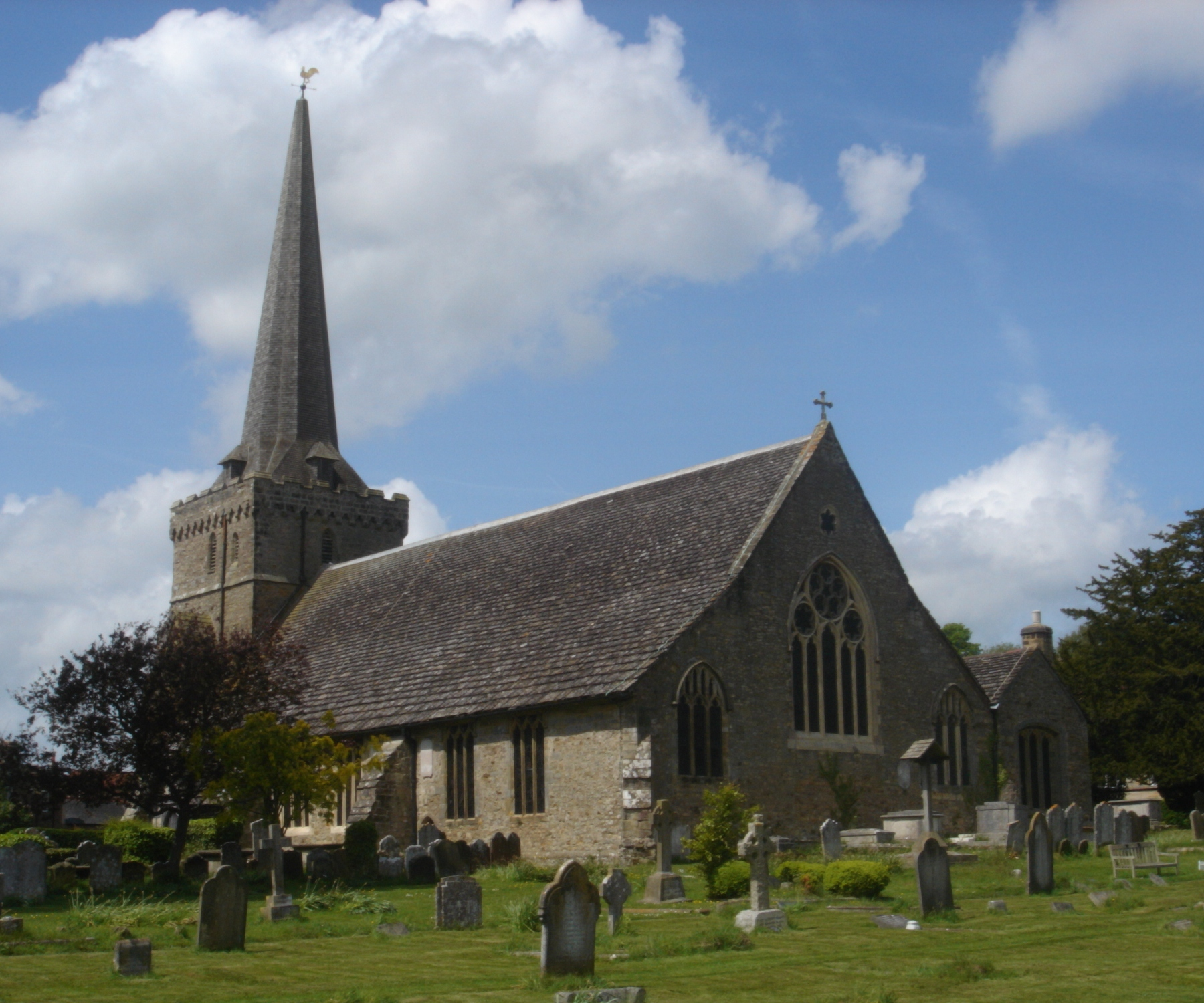
Cuckfield's Holy Trinity Church is one of several Grade I-listed churches in Mid Sussex.

The district of Mid Sussex, one of seven local government districts in the English county of West Sussex, has more than 110 churches and other places of worship. There are 81 extant places of worship serving a wide range of religious denominations, and a further 32 buildings formerly used for public worship, but now closed or used for other purposes, also survive. Most are in the three main towns of Burgess Hill, Haywards Heath and East Grinstead, but almost every village and hamlet in the mostly rural district has at least one church or chapel. Many Christian denominations are represented, and mosques opened in Haywards Heath in 2010 and in Burgess Hill seven years later.

Many of Mid Sussex's places of worship have been awarded listed status. A building is defined as "listed" when it is placed on a statutory register of buildings of "special architectural or historic interest" in accordance with the Planning (Listed Buildings and Conservation Areas) Act 1990. The Department for Culture, Media and Sport, a Government department, is responsible for this; English Heritage, a non-departmental public body, acts as an agency of the department to administer the process and advise the department on relevant issues. There are three grades of listing status. Grade I, the highest, is defined as being of "exceptional interest"; Grade II* is used for "particularly important buildings of more than special interest"; and Grade II, the lowest, is used for buildings of "special interest".

All Anglican churches in Mid Sussex are in the Diocese of Chichester. Some have their own parish, while others are part of larger parishes covering more than one village. All Roman Catholic churches are part of the Diocese of Arundel and Brighton.

== Religious affiliation ==
According to the 2021 United Kingdom census, 152,569 people lived in Mid Sussex district. Of these, 47.92% identified themselves as Christian, 1.21% were Muslim, 1.03% were Hindu, 0.38% were Buddhist, 0.21% were Jewish, 0.1% were Sikh, 0.73% followed another religion, 42.08% claimed no religious affiliation and 6.34% did not state their religion. The proportions of Christians and people who followed no religion were higher than the figures in England as a whole (46.32% and 36.67% respectively). Islam, Judaism, Hinduism, Buddhism and Sikhism had a lower following in the district than in the country overall: in 2021, 6.73% of people in England were Muslim, 1.81% were Hindu, 0.92% were Sikh, 0.48% were Jewish and 0.46% were Buddhist.

== Administration ==
Anglican churches in Mid Sussex are in the Archdeaconry of Horsham, one of three archdeaconries in the Diocese of Chichester. The cathedral of the diocese is at Chichester.

There are eight deaneries (groups of parishes) within the archdeaconry, three of which cover all of Mid Sussex's Anglican churches between them. Haywards Heath's five churches, and those in Ardingly, Balcombe, Bolney, Cuckfield, Handcross, Highbrook, Horsted Keynes, Lindfield, Scaynes Hill, Slaugham, Staplefield, Warninglid (now closed) and West Hoathly are in the Rural Deanery of Cuckfield.

The Rural Deanery of East Grinstead includes that town's four churches and those in Ashurst Wood, Copthorne, Crawley Down and Turners Hill. The Rural Deanery of Hurst covers three churches in Burgess Hill, two in Hurstpierpoint and the churches in Albourne, Clayton, Hassocks, Keymer, Newtimber, Poynings, Pyecombe, Sayers Common and Twineham.

The Roman Catholic Diocese of Arundel and Brighton, whose cathedral is at Arundel, covers Mid Sussex and all of its Roman Catholic churches. The parish of Haywards Heath includes the town's St Paul's Church, St Stephen's Church in Horsted Keynes and Our Lady of Fatima's Church in Staplefield. The parish of Burgess Hill has one church, St Wilfrid's.

East Grinstead's parish includes Our Lady and St Peter's Church in the town and two other Roman Catholic churches outside the district. The parish of Worth Abbey covers the church in Worth Abbey and St Dunstan's in West Hoathly.

St Edward the Confessor's Church in Keymer and St Luke's Church in Hurstpierpoint are part of a united parish, Keymer with Hurstpierpoint.

== Current places of worship ==
Current places of worship
Name	Image	Location	Denomination/ Affiliation	Grade	Notes	Refs
St Bartholomew's Church (More images)		Albourne; 50.9310°N 0.2132°W	Anglican	II	The dedication to Bartholomew was first mentioned in 1442. George Gilbert Scott retained parts of the original 12th-century structure when he rebuilt the church in 1853. Ancient fittings include a medieval piscina and font. The church stands on an isolated lane outside the village.	
Brethren's Gospel Hall (More images)		Albourne; 50.9327°N 0.2013°W	Plymouth Brethren Christian Church	–	Planning permission was granted in January 2009 for the construction of a large Gospel Hall catering for Exclusive Brethren from across Sussex on the site of a former plant nursery. It replaces a former place of worship in Patcham, and was registered for marriages in April 2012.	
St Peter's Church (More images)		Ardingly; 51.0521°N 0.0899°W	Anglican	I	William de Warenne almost certainly founded the church in the late 11th century. The wool trade made the village wealthy in the 14th century, and a replacement was built in about 1350 in the then-popular Decorated Gothic style. Some masonry and a stone capital were preserved when the Norman-era north wall was demolished in 1887.	
St Dunstan's Church (More images)		Ashurst Wood; 51.1110°N 0.0265°E	Anglican	–	Built in 1859, possibly by William Habershon, this Early English-style church of brick with stone dressings was originally a Congregational church; it was registered for marriages under this identity in February 1862. In 1979 it became the new St Dunstan's Anglican church when its predecessor closed. The spire on the small tower is faced with slate.	
St Mary's Church (More images)		Balcombe; 51.0627°N 0.1363°W	Anglican	I	This small church is of stone (mainly ashlar) and was reconfigured during 19th-century rebuilding work. The ancient nave and chancel are now the south aisle and its side chapel respectively. These date from around 1300. An ancient tower with a small octagonal spire stands at the west end.	
St Mary Magdalene's Church (More images)		Bolney; 50.9898°N 0.2035°W	Anglican	I	Over the centuries, many additions have been made to the 12th-century nave and chancel: a tower in 1538, a porch in 1718, an aisle in 1853 and an adjacent vestry in the 20th century. The lychgate is of Sussex oak and marble.	
Bolney Village Chapel (More images)		Bolney; 50.9973°N 0.2013°W	Countess of Huntingdon's Connexion	–	This building was an independent mission hall when it was established in the 19th century. In July 2003, Mid Sussex District Council granted planning permission for a replacement chapel to be built on the site. In its present form, Bolney Village Chapel is part of the Countess of Huntingdon's Connexion and a member of the Evangelical Alliance.	
St John the Evangelist's Church (More images)		Burgess Hill; 50.9573°N 0.1332°W	Anglican	II*	The ecclesiastical parish of St John's Common was formed from part of Keymer parish when Thomas Talbot Bury's Gothic-style red, yellow and black brick church was completed in 1863. The church, opposite the town's park, has a three-stage tower with a tall spire.	
St Andrew's Church (More images)		Burgess Hill; 50.9602°N 0.1211°W	Anglican	–	A local farm owner built a mission hall and schoolroom on his land in the 1880s. A larger tin building replaced it; in 1908 a brick church superseded this. It was parished as soon as it opened. The east end was completed in 1924, but money ran out before a tower could be built.	
St Edward the Confessor's Church (More images)		Burgess Hill; 50.9605°N 0.1487°W	Anglican	–	Standing in Burgess Hill's main cemetery in the west of town, St Edward's was built in 1936 on a 2.75-acre (1.11 ha) former brickyard site. It was allocated a parish in August 2000.	
Centre Church (Mid-Sussex Christian Centre) (More images)		Burgess Hill; 50.9618°N 0.1372°W	Assemblies of God	–	The core of the building is W. Brooker's brick and tile Congregational church of 1829. Major alterations were made in 1923, and by its closure in 1976 it was called St John's Common United Reformed Church. In 1978 the Assemblies of God denomination acquired it.	
Gateway Baptist Church (More images)		Burgess Hill; 50.9539°N 0.1373°W	Baptist	–	Built in 1965–66 on a former brickworks, this church replaced E.J. Hamilton's red-brick Gothic building structure of 1894 in the town centre, which was demolished in 1970 when The Martlets shopping centre was developed.	
King's Church Mid-Sussex (More images)		Burgess Hill; 50.9546°N 0.1450°W	Evangelical	–	This began as a small house church in 1977. Meetings transferred to Clair Hall in Haywards Heath, but this new £3.5 million building on Burgess Hill's Victoria Industrial Estate opened on 22 July 2012—by which time the church had about 400 members.	
Kingdom Hall (More images)		Burgess Hill; 50.9555°N 0.1485°W	Jehovah's Witnesses	–	This modern brick building is used by the Burgess Hill and Haywards Heath Congregations of Jehovah's Witnesses. They originally met in a building on Grove Road (between 1959 and 1971) and then until 1985 in Haywards Heath at the former St Edmund's Hall, but the present building was erected in 1985. Exterior alterations were undertaken between 2009 and 2011.	
Burgess Hill Methodist Church (More images)		Burgess Hill; 50.9574°N 0.1393°W	Methodist	–	This brick building on London Road was built in 1957–58 to replace an adjacent brick and stone church of 1900, which was built in the Perpendicular style by J. Weir. This is now the church hall.	
Burgess Hill Community Mosque (More images)		Burgess Hill; 50.9572°N 0.1381°W	Muslim	–	A community of Exclusive Brethren began meeting at a house in Mill Road in 1870 before moving to Lower Church Road and building this new red- and brown-brick meeting hall in 1905. In 1983 a new meeting room at Fairfield Road superseded it; the building was sold to the British Red Cross and was used as their local office until 2017. At that time the local Sunni Muslim community bought it and converted it into a mosque.	
Oakmeeds Gospel Hall (More images)		Burgess Hill; 50.9532°N 0.1320°W	Plymouth Brethren Christian Church	–	This building on Station Road in Burgess Hill, originally the town's library, was registered in 2009 as a Brethren meeting room to cater for growth in Burgess Hill's Plymouth Brethren Christian Church community.	
Brethren Meeting Room (More images)		Burgess Hill; 50.9629°N 0.1392°W	Plymouth Brethren Christian Church	–	When the Plymouth Brethren meeting room at Lower Church Road was sold in May 1983, a site was obtained at the junction of London Road and Fairfield Road and a new place of worship was erected there.	
St Wilfrid's Church (More images)		Burgess Hill; 50.9537°N 0.1346°W	Roman Catholic	–	The former Congregational chapel in Grove Road served as Burgess Hill's Roman Catholic church until St Wilfrid's was built by a local firm in 1940. Frank Brangwyn provided the Stations of the Cross and Joseph Cribb, a pupil of Eric Gill, carved the statue of Saint Wilfrid above the entrance.	
Salvation Army Citadel (More images)		Burgess Hill; 50.9563°N 0.1300°W	Salvation Army	–	The Salvation Army have a small hall on Cyprus Road in the town centre. It was built in 1906 to replace a building in nearby Mill Road, in which the congregation had met since 1898. The white-painted hall is of stone and brick.	
All Saints Church (More images)		Burgess Hill; 50.9539°N 0.1250°W	United Reformed Church	–	Burgess Hill's first Congregational chapel, in Grove Road, was replaced by this Classical building with a large portico and columns—an unusual style for such a late construction date (1881). John Betjeman thought it was the town's only decent piece of architecture. It was registered as Junction Road Church.	
St John the Baptist's Church (More images)		Clayton; 50.9105°N 0.1534°W	Anglican	I	This ancient church's 12th-century wall paintings are "unique in England" according to Pevsner. The nave, chancel arch and parts of the chancel are pre-Norman. The wooden bell-turret has three bells.	
St John the Evangelist's Church (More images)		Copthorne; 51.1394°N 0.1177°W	Anglican	–	Copthorne parish was created from part of Worth in 1881. Designed in Early English style by William Habershon and built in 1877, the stone-built parish church has a chancel, nave with north and south aisles, and a tower topped with a steeple and incorporating a porch.	
Copthorne Chapel (More images)		Copthorne; 51.1398°N 0.0906°W	Countess of Huntingdon's Connexion	–	This was one of four chapels established in the area by this small evangelical group—Turners Hill, Crawley Down and West Hoathly had them by the early 19th century as well—but it is the only one still used by them. The stone building was opened on 5 September 1827.	
All Saints Church (More images)		Crawley Down; 51.1213°N 0.0839°W	Anglican	–	The church, built in 1843–44 of rough-dressed stone in the Early English style, gained its own parish in 1862. North and south aisles were added in 1871 and 1888 respectively. The original galleries were taken out in 1888, and a porch was built in 1892.	
Holy Trinity Church (More images)		Cuckfield; 51.0049°N 0.1434°W	Anglican	I	Most of the present structure was built between 1250 and 1340, but an older church on the site was held by Lewes Priory in around 1090. The tower, with its thin spire of shingle, is the oldest part. Charles Eamer Kempe added much stained glass in the 19th century.	
Cuckfield Baptist Church (More images)		Cuckfield; 51.0111°N 0.1398°W	Baptist	–	Cuckfield's Baptist community numbered 20 by 1724, and it established a church in 1772. The small, rendered building, erected in a farmer's field, was extended in 1968.	
St Swithun's Church (More images)		East Grinstead; 51.1243°N 0.0059°W	Anglican	II*	Although first documented in about 1100, when it came under the control of Lewes Priory, East Grinstead's parish church may have older origins. Little is known about the original structure, which fell into disrepair, collapsed and was rebuilt in 1789 by James Wyatt in local yellow sandstone. Charles Eamer Kempe designed the stained glass.	
St Barnabas' Church (More images)		East Grinstead; 51.1150°N 0.0116°W	Anglican	–	The present building dates from 1975 and replaced its 63-year-old predecessor—a barn donated by Lady Musgrave. The west wall is stone-built; the rest of the building is timber. It is a daughter church of St Swithun's, and serves the southern part of the parish.	
St Mary the Virgin Church (More images)		East Grinstead; 51.1323°N 0.0199°W	Anglican	–	Construction started in 1891 and proceeded gradually until 1912. The church was parished and consecrated in 1905. W.T. Lowdell's Decorated Gothic red-brick building, which serves the northwest part of the town, has a flèche and a wooden bell-tower.	
West Street Baptist Church (More images)		East Grinstead; 51.1242°N 0.0089°W	Baptist	II	This was built in 1810 as the Zion Chapel—a name it retained for many years. The brick façade, in a loosely Classical style, has three large arched windows in shallow recesses at first-floor level, below a brick pediment; the ground floor is much altered. It was funded by a local brewer and was the town's first Nonconformist place of worship.	
Jubilee Community Church		East Grinstead; 51.1337°N 0.0148°W	Evangelical	–	This Evangelical church, previously known as New Life Church, is part of the Evangelical Alliance and worships in a 44,000-square-foot (4,100 m^{2}) building called the Jubilee Community Centre.	
Kingdom Hall (More images)		East Grinstead; 51.1280°N 0.0138°W	Jehovah's Witnesses	–	A Jehovah's Witnesses community became established in East Grinstead in 1965 or 1967, when it moved into a hall formerly used by the Salvation Army at Portland Road. A new Kingdom Hall, used by the East Grinstead Congregation of Jehovah's Witnesses, has since been built.	
Trinity Methodist Church (More images)		East Grinstead; 51.1314°N 0.0187°W	Methodist	–	The Primitive Methodist community, established in 1868, worshipped at a building in London Road from 1884 until 1938, when they moved to new premises nearby. The church was extended in 1970 and 1980 as membership grew.	
Church of Jesus Christ of Latter-day Saints, East Grinstead Chapel (More images)		East Grinstead; 51.1234°N 0.0098°W	Mormon	–	East Grinstead's Mormon community worshipped in church halls around the town until they built their own church in 1985 on Ship Street. Administratively, it is in the Crawley Stake. In 1958, London England Temple—Britain's first Mormon temple—was built nearby at Newchapel.	
Our Lady and St Peter's Church (More images)		East Grinstead; 51.1286°N 0.0149°W	Roman Catholic	II	Frederick Walters designed a Norman-style stone church for East Grinstead's Roman Catholic community in 1898. The interior, which does not continue this architectural theme, has a window commemorating the founders, Sir Edward Blount (part of the Blount baronetcy) and his wife. They founded the first Catholic chapel, dedicated to St Edward and St Louis, in the town in 1879. The new church, a "strong and original design", opened on 2 October 1898 and has seen little alteration since.	
Moat United Reformed Church (More images)		East Grinstead; 51.1287°N 0.0141°W	United Reformed Church	–	A Congregational community started to meet in the town in 1866. In 1870 they built a permanent church near the railway station. Edward Steer designed it in the Early English style; his building is of stone and has a tower with a spire.	
All Saints Church (More images)		Handcross; 51.0525°N 0.2023°W	Anglican	–	The village's Anglican church, with a distinctive bell-turret, is administered from Slaugham. In the 1950s, some of its land had to be acquired for the building of the adjacent A23 bypass.	
Zoar Strict Baptist Chapel		Handcross; 51.0543°N 0.2007°W	Baptist	–	A round-windowed, red and yellow brick building of 1888 replaced the village's first Baptist chapel, first recorded in 1782. The chapel's congregation is aligned with the Gospel Standard movement.	
St Francis of Assisi's Church (More images)		Hassocks; 50.9305°N 0.1461°W	Anglican	–	This small church was built in 1975 and is one of three in the Anglican parish of Clayton with Keymer.	
Hassocks United Reformed Church (More images)		Hassocks; 50.9246°N 0.1414°W	United Reformed Church	–	Standing in the centre of the village, this is a former Congregational church which dates from 1885. The former red-brick exterior can still be seen at the side, but the front was rebuilt in imitation stone in 1964.	
St Wilfrid's Church (More images)		Haywards Heath; 50.9992°N 0.1046°W	Anglican	II*	George Frederick Bodley's Decorated Gothic sandstone church of 1863–65 is Haywards Heath's Anglican parish church. It was consecrated in 1865 by the Bishop of Chichester. The tower is 88 feet (27 m) tall and has 11 bells. The stained glass includes depictions of wounded First World War soldiers.	
St Richard's Church (More images)		Haywards Heath; 51.0062°N 0.1015°W	Anglican	II	The dark brick exterior hides reinforced concrete, the main building material for this late-1930s church by Keir Hett, which has elements of the Art Deco style. It replaced an earlier chapel with the same dedication, and became parished in 1939.	
Church of the Ascension (More images)		Haywards Heath; 50.9891°N 0.1077°W	Anglican	–	In the 1960s, St Edmund's Hall—home to an Anglican congregation at that time—was sold and the money raised was used to build this church on a new housing estate in the south of the town. Since 2003, when the Church of the Good Shepherd closed, it has also served the Franklands Village estate. The original octagonal timber structure was rebuilt in brick and concrete in 1997.	
Church of the Presentation (More images)		Haywards Heath; 51.0009°N 0.0927°W	Anglican	–	A temporary church made of iron, erected in 1882, was the first to bear this dedication. It was replaced by a permanent building in 1897. Its pebble-dashed exterior hides red-brick walls. Lancet windows illuminate the large apse.	
Haywards Heath Baptist Church (More images)		Haywards Heath; 50.9949°N 0.1002°W	Baptist	–	The façade of this church, altered and simplified in 1957–58, hides its Renaissance-style origins. A Primitive Methodist congregation occupied the building from September 1876; it was extended and reopened in 1877. Its registration as a Methodist chapel was cancelled in 1991, and it is now used by Baptists.	
Jireh Strict Baptist Chapel (More images)		Haywards Heath; 50.9933°N 0.0999°W	Baptist	–	Sussex has many 19th-century Independent and Baptist chapels in this Vernacular style: a tiled, gabled roof, porch, and red-brick walls with round-arched windows. This example was built in 1879 by William Knight, a horticulturist who was also the chapel's first pastor. It is a Gospel Standard movement chapel.	
Christ Church (More images)		Haywards Heath; 51.0003°N 0.0948°W	Evangelical	–	The community built its first church here in 1936, but its rapid growth led to the construction of a 300-capacity brick building with a total-immersion baptismal pool. It opened in September 1967 as Haywards Heath Evangelical Free Church. The FIEC-aligned church was rebuilt again in 2010–11 and renamed Christ Church.	
Haywards Heath Methodist Church (More images)		Haywards Heath; 51.0036°N 0.1033°W	Methodist	–	The Sussex Wesleyan Mission founded a church on Perrymount Road in March 1900. It was dedicated in August that year. A church hall was added in 1959, and more extensions were made in 1983 and 2000. The red-brick church is in the Early English style.	
Mid Sussex Islamic Centre (More images)		Haywards Heath; 50.9917°N 0.0998°W	Muslim	–	Used by Congregationalists (1861–1915), Anglicans (until the 1960s, when the Church of the Ascension superseded it) and then Jehovah's Witnesses, this chapel (latterly called St Edmund's Hall) later became a Scout hut before being bought and renovated by the Muslim community, who opened it as a mosque in November 2010.	
Franklynn Gospel Hall (More images)		Haywards Heath; 50.9966°N 0.0919°W	Open Brethren	–	This modern meeting hall, in the east of the town, was opened as the Franklynn Christian Fellowship Gospel Hall and was registered for worship and marriages in January 1962. It is registered as a meeting place of Open Brethren. It succeeded a building on Franklynn Road which had been registered as an Unsectarian Gospel Hall since September 1936.	
Kents Road Christian Meeting Hall (More images)		Haywards Heath; 50.9940°N 0.0981°W	Plymouth Brethren	–	This small brick building just south of the town centre was originally an Exclusive Brethren meeting room, established here in the 1930s. The old meeting room replaced one which stood on South Road adjacent to Victoria Park. Since 1970 it has been a meeting place for Christians meeting in accordance with the principles held by early Brethren.	
St Paul's Church (More images)		Haywards Heath; 50.9971°N 0.1002°W	Roman Catholic	–	Founded in 1928 and opened on 12 June 1930, this large brick church was designed by W.G. Maugan in the Romanesque Revival style with Byzantine elements. Interior features include oak panelling, marble paving and Romanesque Stations of the Cross from France.	
Haywards Heath United Reformed Church (More images)		Haywards Heath; 50.9963°N 0.1020°W	United Reformed Church	–	This church opened on 21 July 1915 as a Congregational church, on South Road in the town centre, to replace St Edmund's Hall. The firm of George Baines and Son designed the Perpendicular Gothic building in red brick with pale stone dressings.	
Brethren Meeting Room		Hickstead; 50.9668°N 0.1948°W	Plymouth Brethren Christian Church	–	Planning permission for this meeting room was granted in 2016, and it was registered three years later.	
All Saints Church (More images)		Highbrook, West Hoathly; 51.0549°N 0.0574°W	Anglican	II	Benjamin Ingelow and R.H. Carpenter designed this church in 1884 in a 13th-century Gothic style. There is a tower with a shingled spire, originally of oak. The nave has one aisle and a porch on the opposite side. The church has always been parished.	
St Giles' Church (More images)		Horsted Keynes; 51.0402°N 0.0281°W	Anglican	I	An aisle and porch were built in 1888, but the rest of this cruciform church dates from the 12th and 13th centuries. It has a chancel, nave, transept and tower with a tall, narrow spire. Lancet windows were added in the 13th century. Charles Eamer Kempe installed stained glass in 1895.	
Horsted Keynes Mission Hall (More images)		Horsted Keynes; 51.0367°N 0.0248°W	Evangelical	II	This 18th-century mission hall is built of a mixture of stone and red-brick, with quoins of ashlar. The area below the gable at the south end of the roof is hung with red tiles, and the roof itself is also tiled. A porch was added on the south side in the 19th century. It was founded by members of a Bible class at the parish church, and has also been known as a Gospel Hall.	
Holy Trinity Church (More images)		Hurstpierpoint; 50.9337°N 0.1805°W	Anglican	II*	Rebuilt on the site of the former St Lawrence's Church by Charles Barry in 1843–45, and extended in 1854 and 1874, this large church has Flemish-style stained glass, a 13th-century font and other fittings from the old church. Its style is Gothic Revival.	
Hurstpierpoint Evangelical Church (More images)		Hurstpierpoint; 50.9324°N 0.1742°W	Evangelical	–	This church has links with the Evangelical Free church in Haywards Heath and the Baptist church at Cuckfield. It has its roots in an independent mission chapel, possibly as early as 1833. The name was changed in 1938 to reflect its connection with Evangelicalism.	
Hurstpierpoint Methodist Church (More images)		Hurstpierpoint; 50.9361°N 0.1790°W	Methodist	–	The present church was built in 1981 on the site of its Art Nouveau-style red-brick predecessor. This was designated as a Wesleyan chapel and was founded in August 1909; building work continued through 1910. It had in turn replaced an earlier (1834) chapel elsewhere in the village.	
St Cosmas and St Damian Church (More images)		Keymer; 50.9219°N 0.1306°W	Anglican	II	A Saxon church on this site was rebuilt in the 12th century, and the walls of the chancel and apse remain from that era. In 1866, Edmund Scott rebuilt the church in a 14th-century style, and added aisles to the nave. The tower has a steeple and a small spire.	
St Edward the Confessor's Church (More images)		Keymer; 50.9219°N 0.1325°W	Roman Catholic	–	Leo Hothersall's £35,000 church replaced a temporary building on the same site. Work began in May 1972 and the first service was held on 6 April 1973. The adjacent presbytery was added later. The interior was altered and new fittings, including a stone font, were provided in 1999. The French crucifix above the altar dates from 1781.	
All Saints Church (More images)		Lindfield; 51.0162°N 0.0784°W	Anglican	II*	Formerly dedicated to St John the Baptist and built of sandstone with locally produced roof tiles, this church is mostly 14th-century, although one existed on the site 200 years earlier. The three-stage tower at the west end has a tall shingled spire. Victorian restoration focused on the nave and its roof.	
Lindfield Evangelical Free Church (More images)		Lindfield; 51.0117°N 0.0799°W	Evangelical	–	This church had its origin in the Sewell Memorial Mission, named after a former vicar of All Saints Church who built the mission hall opposite the church in the mid-19th century. The congregation moved to a new building in 1939, and the name was changed in 1980.	
Lindfield United Reformed Church (More images)		Lindfield; 51.0125°N 0.0811°W	United Reformed Church	–	Architects William and Edward Habershon designed this chapel for the Congregational Church (now part of the United Reformed Church). It was built in the Decorated Gothic style between 1857 and 1858 using yellow brick and stone.	
St John the Evangelist's Church (More images)		Newtimber; 50.9060°N 0.1937°W	Anglican	II*	The 13th-century church was substantially restored by Benjamin Ingelow and R.H. Carpenter in 1875. The tower, with a large rose window, was added in 1839. The north chapel was originally a private chapel for the occupants of Newtimber Place.	
Holy Trinity Church (More images)		Poynings; 50.8944°N 0.2035°W	Anglican	I	This cruciform church, in the 13th-century style, was built in around 1370. A window from Chichester Cathedral was installed in the south transept in the mid-17th century. Other windows have 15th-century stained glass. Architecturally, the church is early Perpendicular Gothic.	
Church of the Transfiguration (More images)		Pyecombe; 50.8983°N 0.1644°W	Anglican	I	The chancel, chancel arch and nave of this isolated downland church date from about 1170. The tower, with a shallow "cap"-style roof, was built in the 13th century. Minor restoration was carried out in the 19th century. The churchyard has a rare Tapsel gate, a centrally pivoted design unique to Sussex.	
Christ Church (More images)		Sayers Common; 50.9532°N 0.1945°W	Anglican	–	Sayers Common became parished in 1881; previously it had been part of Hurstpierpoint. The church, in the Early English style of flint dressed with red brick, was built in 1880; a chancel and vestry were added in 1909.	
St Augustine of Canterbury Church (More images)		Scaynes Hill; 50.9924°N 0.05116°W	Anglican	II	Matthew Habershon designed this red-brick church in 1858 with elements of the Decorated and Perpendicular Gothic styles. The tower, with a timber belfry and pyramid spire, was added at the southwest corner in 1883, and Thomas Garrett built a north aisle in 1913.	
Scaynes Hill Strict Baptist Chapel (More images)		Scaynes Hill; 50.9931°N 0.0505°W	Baptist	–	The village's small Strict Baptist chapel dates from 1875 and was extended in 2008. The red-brick building, with round-headed, segmental-arched windows, stands just north of St Augustine of Canterbury Church. It is aligned with the Gospel Standard Baptist movement.	
St Mary's Church (More images)		Slaugham; 51.0383°N 0.2080°W	Anglican	II*	The parish of this mostly 12th- and 13th-century church covers Handcross, Pease Pottage and Warninglid as well as the hamlet of Slaugham. The square font is as old as the building and is of local marble.	
St Mark's Church (More images)		Staplefield; 51.0388°N 0.1788°W	Anglican	II	Benjamin Ferrey's Early English-style church of 1847 became parished the next year. The chancel has wall paintings and stained glass by Charles Eamer Kempe. A three-stage bell-arch tops the roof at the west end. Memorials include one to Boy Scout casualties of the First World War.	
Our Lady of Fatima Church (More images)		Staplefield; 51.0369°N 0.1795°W	Roman Catholic	–	Originally a Baptist chapel of 1827, this stone building was altered considerably when a local family bought it and presented it to the Roman Catholic Church in 1966. The first Mass was celebrated on 9 October of that year.	
St Leonard's Church (More images)		Turners Hill; 51.1021°N 0.0915°W	Anglican	II	The original design of 1895 by Lacy W. Ridge - responsible for many churches in the Diocese of Chichester - lacked the tower which now stands at the west end. This was built in 1923 to a plan made by Aston Webb, and serves as a memorial to World War I. Charles Eamer Kempe provided all the stained glass.	
Turners Hill Free Church (More images)		Turners Hill; 51.1043°N 0.0850°W	Independent	–	The present building dates from 1906, but it is the second on this site: the Countess of Huntingdon's Connexion established a presence in the village in 1823. The stone and red-brick, Decorated Gothic-style building is now used by the Free Church.	
St Peter's Church (More images)		Twineham; 50.9657°N 0.2174°W	Anglican	I	Built entirely of brick in the 16th century—an early date for a brick church—Twineham's parish church stands in a very rural situation. It consists of a chancel, nave, tower at the west end and wooden porch. The tower has a spire and a peal of five bells. The churchyard has a section for Quaker burials.	
St Margaret's Church (More images)		West Hoathly; 51.0766°N 0.0557°W	Anglican	I	The oldest part of this church is the nave, which dates from the late 11th century. The chancel, aisle, tower, spire, porch and lancet windows were added over the next 350 years. The nave and chancel underwent restoration in 1870. The churchyard is terraced with a series of retaining walls.	
St Dunstan's Church (More images)		West Hoathly; 51.0777°N 0.0550°W	Roman Catholic	–	This church is administered from the Abbey Church at Worth Abbey, and is part of its parish. Until 1957 it was a cottage with an attached butcher's shop; with little alteration, the 19th-century structure was converted into a place of worship. English Heritage describes it as a "curiosity".	
Abbey Church of our Lady Help of Christians (More images)		Worth Abbey; 51.0926°N 0.1183°W	Roman Catholic (Benedictine)	II	Although the foundation stone is dated 1968, work on Francis Pollen's Modernist rotunda-style church started in 1964 and continued after his death in 1987. Its 1,400 capacity makes it Sussex's largest church. The main building material is reinforced concrete, although there is some timber work.	

== Former places of worship ==
Former places of worship
Name	Image	Location	Denomination/ Affiliation	Grade	Notes	Refs
St John the Evangelist's Church (More images)		Ansty; 50.9947°N 0.1619°W	Anglican	–	This small iron and brick chapel, which one source states to have been Congregational, was built in 1879 in the hamlet of Ansty, near Cuckfield. Maps confirm its later status as an Anglican mission church. It was extended in 1883 and further renovated and rededicated as a memorial chapel on 10 December 1909. The final service was held at Christmas 2000, and it has been converted into a house.	
Ardingly Congregational Fellowship Church (More images)		Ardingly; 51.0488°N 0.0797°W	Independent; Congregational	–	The area had a long-established Nonconformist tradition, and the red-brick chapel was built in 1885–86 in the Early English style to replace a building dating from 1822. Latterly the only active Congregational place of worship remaining in Mid Sussex, it has closed by 2011 when it was converted into a wellbeing centre.	
St Dunstan's Church (More images)		Ashurst Wood; 51.1127°N 0.0200°E	Anglican	–	Ashurst Wood's original Anglican church was designed by Lacy W. Ridge in the Early English style. It opened in 1884, but its deteriorating condition led to its closure in 1979. The former Congregational church was then rededicated to St Dunstan and became the new Anglican church.	
Balcombe United Reformed Church (More images)		Balcombe; 51.0598°N 0.1337°W	United Reformed Church	–	A Congregational fellowship existed in the village from the 1850s, and the first building was provided in 1863. In 1896 a Lindfield Nonconformist bought a tin tabernacle from Tintern Abbey, where it was being used as a tearoom, and transported it to Balcombe, where a site on which to erect it had recently been bought. It was refronted in brick in 1957 and was used until 1996, when the present brick chapel replaced it. Latterly linked to administratively to the Lindfield United Reformed Church, it was briefly called Balcombe Free Church before its closure in July 2012. Now called Bramble Hall, it is leased to Balcombe Parish Council for village activities.	
Providence Chapel (More images)		Bolney; 50.9874°N 0.2098°W	Baptist	–	A plaque embedded in the west wall records the chapel's construction date of 1858. It was used for worship from 1859 until 1962 (although its registration was not cancelled until 1970). In about 1980 it became a house. The red brick and stone building has elements of the Gothic style.	
All Saints Church (Brook Street Mission Church) (More images)		Brook Street; 51.0241°N 0.1397°W	Anglican	–	The hamlet of Brook Street is in Cuckfield's ecclesiastical parish. A mission chapel, which has been converted into a picture-framing shop, was built to serve the area. Structural problems and a declining congregation caused it to close in November 1968.	
St Alban's Mission Hall		Burgess Hill; 50.9594°N 0.1415°W	Anglican	–	This was the first mission hall under the control of St John the Evangelist's Church. It opened in 1885 to serve the west side of the parish. The building, which cost £324 (£36,000 as of 2025), is now an Age Concern centre.	
World's End Mission Hall		Burgess Hill; 50.9656°N 0.1187°W	Anglican	–	In 1887, 24 years after St John the Evangelist's Church opened, this mission hall was built at the expense of Somers Clarke to serve the northeastern part of Burgess Hill known as World's End. In 1898 it was replaced by the nearby tin building which was itself superseded by St Andrew's Church.	
Providence Strict Baptist Chapel (More images)		Burgess Hill; 50.9590°N 0.1356°W	Baptist	II	Simeon Norman built this Neoclassical-style chapel, with Doric pilasters and a first-floor pediment, in 1875, and it was registered for marriages in June 1876. Its walls, originally covered with cement, were later stuccoed. It was sold for redevelopment in 1999 and was converted into flats.	
Crawley Down Methodist Chapel		Crawley Down; 51.1252°N 0.0877°W	Methodist	–	Architect T.R. Hooper's Decorated Gothic-style chapel of 1896, built of stone-dressed red brick, has been converted into an office. The large rose window remains intact above the entrance. The church was registered for marriages in February 1899 and deregistered in September 1969.	
Cuckfield United Reformed Church (More images)		Cuckfield; 51.0066°N 0.1412°W	United Reformed Church	–	Established in the 1820s as Providence Congregational Chapel, this building took its present form in 1869 when architect M. Deacon's Early English-style design in red and yellow brick was realised. It later became a United Reformed church. In 1979 it was closed and—with minimal alteration—became an office.	
First Church of Christ, Scientist, East Grinstead		East Grinstead; 51.1259°N 0.0075°W	Christian Scientist	–	This congregation was established in a former school on Cantelupe Road in 1930, although it was only certified for worship in 1939. After closure in 1985, it became an office. A reading room also existed on nearby London Road between 1940 and 1951.	
Gospel Protestant Mission Hall (More images)		East Grinstead; 51.1259°N 0.0051°W	Countess of Huntingdon's Connexion	–	The Connexion had its headquarters in this chapel until the 1970s, and it was also used for worship: The London Gazette recorded the granting of a marriage licence on 5 August 1926. It was re-registered as an Evangelical Free Church in 1959. Under the name Huntingdon Hall, it now houses an engineering company.	
Friends Meeting House		East Grinstead; 51.1266°N 0.0133°W	Quaker	–	East Grinstead's Quaker community first met for worship in the 1930s in a private house. By the early 1950s, they had bought this building on Railway Approach and converted it into a meeting house. It was extended in 1957, but worship ceased in the 1980s and the building entered commercial use.	
Salvation Army Hall		East Grinstead; 51.1299°N 0.0164°W	Salvation Army	–	The Salvation Army had premises in West Street between 1887 and the 1920s, when this hall opened. After its closure in 1967, it was used by Jehovah's Witnesses until they opened their new kingdom hall; then it entered commercial use.	
Church of the Good Shepherd		Fulking; 50.8892°N 0.2270°W	Anglican	–	Fulking did not have a place of worship until 1925, when a mission chapel was built. This was administered as part of the parish of St Andrew's Church in neighbouring Edburton. It is now a private house.	
Christian Science Church (More images)		Haywards Heath; 50.9993°N 0.1059°W	Christian Scientist	–	This was established in about 1950 in an 1857 building which had been Haywards Heath's first school. This is now a restaurant, but a smaller church and reading room was established in an extension on the north side. This closed in the early 21st century.	
Priory of Our Lady of Good Counsel (More images)		Haywards Heath; 50.9951°N 0.0986°W	Roman Catholic	II	Although it was built for nuns from Bruges between 1886 and 1898, this Early English/Decorated-style red-brick building was also used as Haywards Heath's first Roman Catholic church when the community grew. The nuns gave land nearby to establish a separate church, St Paul's, in 1930. The building entered commercial use in 1978 and is now a restaurant.	
Horsted Keynes Strict Baptist Chapel (More images)		Horsted Keynes; 51.0362°N 0.0275°W	Baptist	–	This was the oldest Nonconformist place of worship in the large parish of Horsted Keynes. After two periods of service—during the 1860s and for a time during the 1950s—this chapel, built in 1861 next to the village green, closed and later became a British Legion social club. Its registration for worship was cancelled in 1970.	
Horsted Keynes Congregational Hall		Horsted Keynes; 51.0368°N 0.0301°W	Congregational	–	The efforts of Louisa Martindale led to the establishment of an independent church based on Congregational principles in 1907. The red-brick building, extended in 1950, has been converted into a multi-purpose facility called the Martindale Centre.	
St Stephen's Church (More images)		Horsted Keynes; 51.0337°N 0.0279°W	Roman Catholic	–	This modern church was latterly in the parish of St Paul's Church in Haywards Heath, and was administered from there. It was registered for marriages in April 1976.	
St George's Chapel (More images)		Hurstpierpoint; 50.9328°N 0.1703°W	Anglican	II	This Early English-style flint church was built in 1832 as a private chapel, and was later used by Baptists. In 1881, it was left to James Hannington (later the First Bishop of Eastern Equatorial Africa); after his death the Ecclesiastical Commissioners conveyed it to the Church of England. It was consecrated as an Anglican chapel of ease in 1892. The Diocese of Chichester declared it redundant in October 2008, and it was listed soon afterwards.	
Hope Baptist Chapel (More images)		Hurstpierpoint; 50.9348°N 0.1828°W	Baptist	–	This was founded as a Strict Baptist chapel by Eli Page in 1876, and replaced an older chapel on Manor Road. The building has a red-brick façade and is in the Vernacular style. Permission was granted in 2006 for its conversion into a house, and its marriage registration was formally cancelled in October 2015.	
Hurstpierpoint Wesleyan Chapel (More images)		Hurstpierpoint; 50.9349°N 0.1809°W	Methodist	–	Used by Methodists between 1834 and 1910, when a new church replaced it nearby, this Classical-style stuccoed chapel with Corinthian pilasters passed into commercial use and was altered externally.	
St Luke's Church (More images)		Hurstpierpoint; 50.9399°N 0.1791°W	Roman Catholic	–	Two early 20th-century cottages were bought in 1925 and converted into a mission room which later became a church. Later extensions included a side chapel and a gallery, and in 1999 stained glass was added. St Luke's was part of the parish of St Wilfrid, Burgess Hill, until October 1978; after that it was part of a joint parish with St Edward the Confessor's Church in Keymer. The church closed around the time the parish was reorganised again in 2020.	
Church of the Ascension (More images)		Pease Pottage; 51.0831°N 0.2030°W	Anglican	–	This chapel of ease to Slaugham was granted a licence in 1875, but has since closed and has been turned into offices. Its design is broadly Gothic.	
Zion Strict Baptist Chapel (More images)		Poynings; 50.8936°N 0.2070°W	Baptist	–	This chapel, which had links with the Ebenezer chapel in Brighton, opened in 1843. It has become a holiday cottage but has had little alteration: the Classical-style exterior with stuccoed flint and brick walls remains intact.	
Congregational Chapel (More images)		Pyecombe; 50.8988°N 0.1636°W	Congregational	–	Pyecombe is one of several Mid Sussex villages whose 19th-century Nonconformist chapel has been turned into a house. It was built of red brick in 1876.	
Sharpthorne Community Church (More images)		Sharpthorne; 51.0752°N 0.0416°W	Countess of Huntingdon's Connexion	–	This church plant was established in a small hall in the hamlet of Sharpthorne by members of the nearby Turners Hill Free Church. It was registered as Sharpthorne Free Church.	
St Andrew's Church (More images)		Warninglid; 51.0206°N 0.2179°W	Anglican	–	Francis G. Troup designed this chapel of ease to St Mary's Church at Slaugham in 1935 to serve the hamlet of Warninglid. A chapel had first been proposed nearly a century earlier. The cruciform brick building has steep roofs and tall windows, and there is some stained glass. In 2009 it was sold for residential use.	
Providence Chapel		West Hoathly; 51.0820°N 0.0569°W	Baptist	–	A "neat little brick-built chapel" on a hillside on the road to Selsfield Common and Turners Hill replaced an older wooden structure used by Strict Baptists. It was registered for marriages in April 1939, but was deregistered in February 1980 after its closure.	
Countess of Huntingdon's Chapel		West Hoathly; 51.0803°N 0.0530°W	Countess of Huntingdon's Connexion	–	As at 2009, this building was disused and had planning permission for residential conversion. The timber-framed weatherboarded chapel section was built in the mid-1820s; in 1904 a brick schoolroom was added to the west. It was one of many chapels founded by the Calvinistic religious leader Selina Hastings, Countess of Huntingdon.	

== See also ==
- Grade I listed buildings in West Sussex
- List of demolished places of worship in West Sussex
