= Providence Strict Baptist Chapel, Burgess Hill =

Providence Strict Baptist Chapel
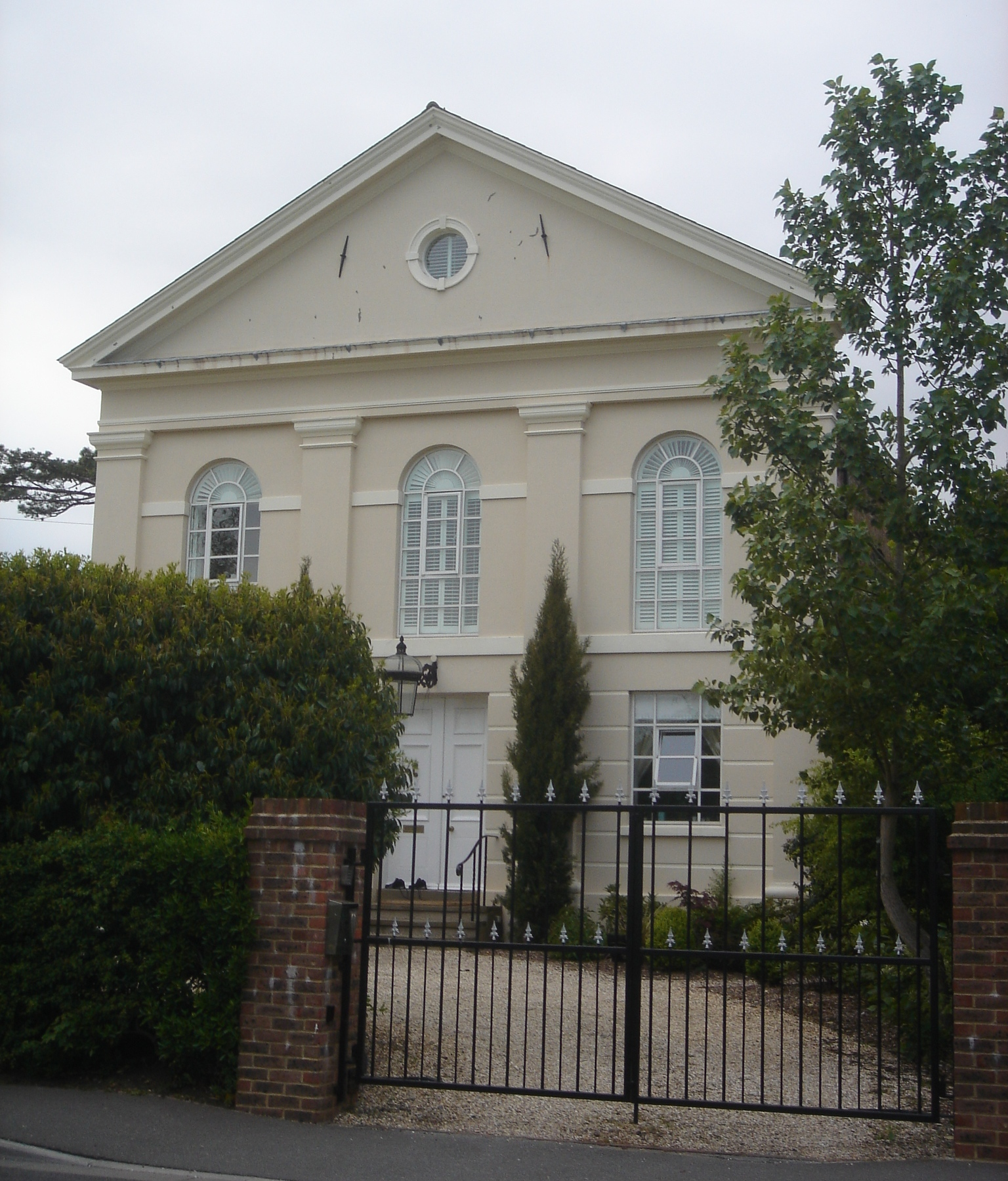
- The chapel from the south
- Providence Strict Baptist Chapel
- 50.9590°N 0.1356°W
- Location: Park Road, Burgess Hill, West Sussex RH15 8EU
- Country: England
- Denomination: Baptist

History
- Status: Former chapel
- Founded: 1875
- Founder(s): Eli Ashdown, Frederick Hoadley

Architecture
- Functional status: Residential conversion
- Heritage designation: Grade II
- Designated: 27 November 1975
- Architect: Simeon Norman
- Style: Neoclassical
- Completed: 1875
- Closed: 1999

Providence Strict Baptist Chapel is a former Strict Baptist place of worship in the town of Burgess Hill in Mid Sussex, one of seven local government districts in the English county of West Sussex. Founded in 1875 by two prominent residents of the town at a time when Protestant Nonconformism was well established in Sussex, the chapel continued in religious use for over a century until it was sold for conversion to a family home in 1999. The Neoclassical building stands in a conservation area opposite Burgess Hill's main park. English Heritage has listed the building at Grade II for its architectural and historical importance.

== History ==
Burgess Hill—now a town of about 30,000 people—did not exist until the mid-19th century, when the London and Brighton Railway built a railway line across St John's Common, an area of common land divided between the parishes of Clayton and Keymer. The line and Burgess Hill railway station opened in 1841, and rapid population growth led to the building of an Anglican church, St John the Evangelist's, in the early 1860s and the creation of an ecclesiastical parish in 1863.

One of the most important early residents was Frederick Hoadley. In 1857 he founded a department store on a prominent site near the railway station; it was so successful that other branches were opened elsewhere in Sussex. In 1875, together with fellow resident Eli Ashdown, he formed a trust to fund the establishment of a Strict Baptist place of worship in the town. St John's Park, a 6.5-acre (2.6 ha) recreational area in the town centre, was presented to the town in 1871 as a memorial to a local philanthropist. Hoadley and Ashdown bought a site on Park Road, with a southward view across the park, in 1875 and commissioned architect Simeon Norman to design a chapel. It was registered for marriages on 20 June 1876. There were already other Nonconformist places of worship in the town: a Congregational church of 1829 predated the railway-influenced development, and congregations of both Plymouth Brethren and General Baptists were founded in 1870. Methodists, Congregationalists and the Salvation Army also had a presence by 1900.

Simeon Norman's chapel continued to serve the Strict Baptist community throughout the 20th century, but attendances gradually fell. It was therefore sold in 1999, and has been converted into a family home and renamed Providence House.

The Providence Strict Baptist Chapel was listed at Grade II by English Heritage on 27 November 1975; this defines it as a "nationally important" building of "special interest". As of February 2001, it was one of 958 Grade II listed buildings, and 1,028 listed buildings of all grades, in the district of Mid Sussex. It is within the St John's Common Conservation Area designated by Mid Sussex District Council.

== Architecture ==
The chapel was built in a style described as either Classical or Neoclassical. The two-storey structure has three equally spaced round-headed windows on the upper floor of the façade, and two square-headed windows flanking the entrance door below. Between these are four Doric pilasters which are topped with a pediment. Originally faced with cement, it is now stuccoed.

== See also ==
- List of places of worship in Mid Sussex

== Bibliography ==
- Avery, Frederic M. (2001). Burgess Hill in Old Picture Postcards (Volume 2). Zaltbommel: European Library. ISBN 90-288-3562-8.
- Dudeney, Mark; Hallett, Eileen (2006). Bygone Days in Burgess Hill. Burgess Hill: Mid-Sussex Books. ISBN 0-9530625-2-X.
- Elleray, D. Robert (2004). Sussex Places of Worship. Worthing: Optimus Books. ISBN 0-9533132-7-1.
- Matthews, Hugh (2006). Burgess Hill. Additional chapter by Mark Dudeney (2nd ed.). Chichester: Phillimore & Co. Ltd. ISBN 1-86077-437-7.
