= West Street Baptist Church, East Grinstead =

West Street Baptist Church
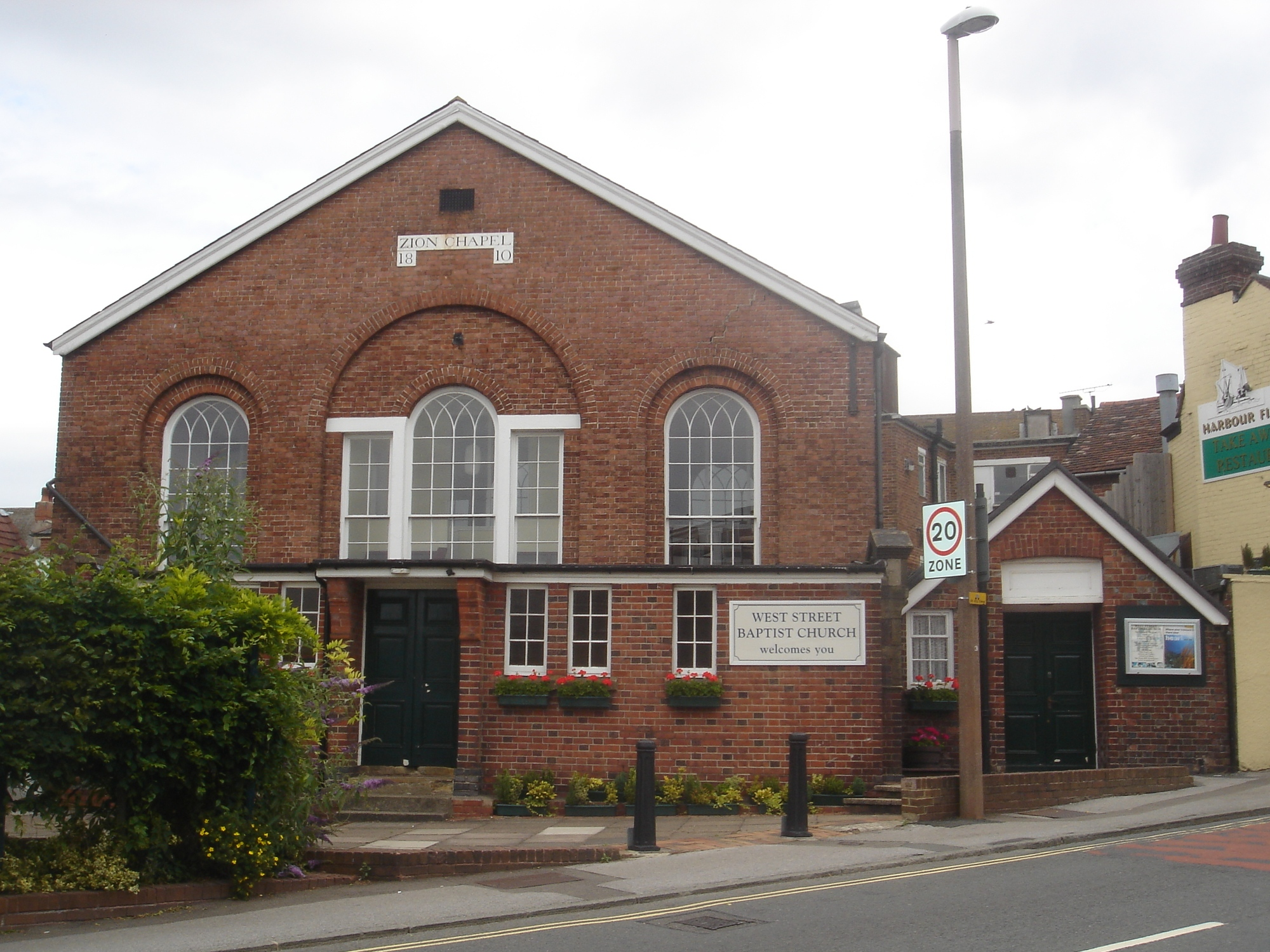
- The church from the southeast
- West Street Baptist Church
- 51.1242°N 0.0089°W
- Location: West Street, East Grinstead, West Sussex RH19 4EY
- Country: England
- Denomination: Baptist
- Previous denomination: Countess of Huntingdon's Connexion; Strict Baptist
- Churchmanship: Evangelical
- Website: www.weststreetbc.org.uk

History
- Former name: Zion Chapel
- Status: Church
- Founded: 2 July 1810
- Founder: John Burt

Architecture
- Functional status: Active
- Heritage designation: Grade II
- Designated: 28 January 1948
- Style: Classical
- Completed: 1811

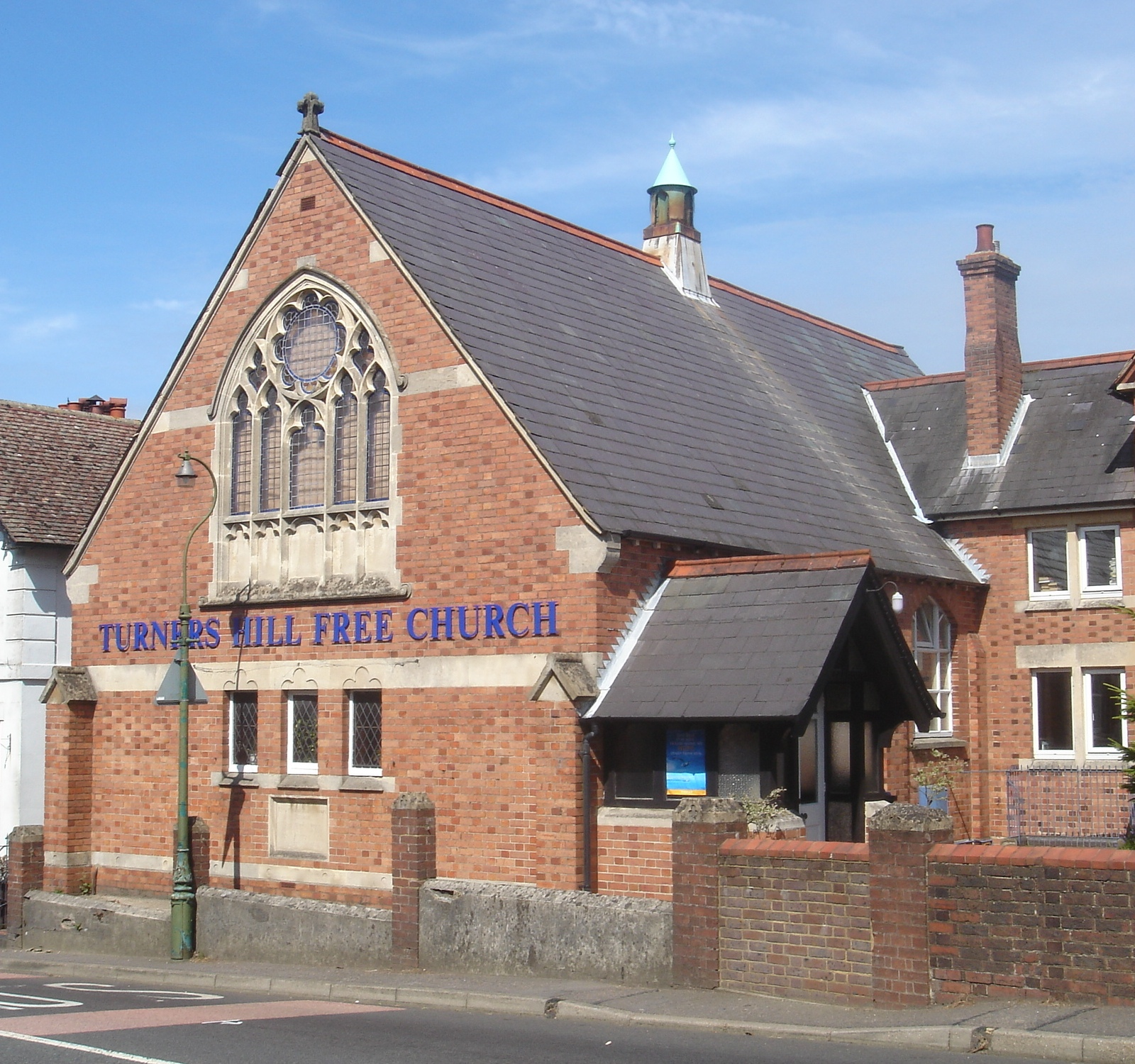
In 1824, members of Zion Chapel established a daughter church at nearby Turners Hill (present building pictured).

West Street Baptist Church (formerly Zion Chapel) is a Baptist church in East Grinstead, a town in the district of Mid Sussex, one of seven local government districts in the English county of West Sussex. Founded in 1810 as a chapel linked to the Countess of Huntingdon's Connexion, it was the first Nonconformist place of worship in East Grinstead; the town's subsequent development made it a local centre of both Protestant Nonconformity and alternative religions. The red-brick building is still used by a Baptist community, and is protected as a Grade II listed building.

== History ==
East Grinstead was founded during or before the 13th century: little is known of its early history. It officially became a market town in 1247 when it was granted a charter, but a market existed before this. Standing on an isolated hilltop site in the Weald, away from the main timber-producing and ironworking areas which drove the local economy in the medieval period, it grew slowly over the next few centuries.

The north of Sussex developed a strong tradition of Nonconformism and Protestant dissent in the 16th, 17th and 18th centuries. In 1676, 27% of the population of Ifield, a few miles west of East Grinstead, worshipped outside the communion of the Established Church of England; one of the world's first Quaker meeting houses was founded there in that year. Baptist worship was prevalent in nearby Horsham, and members of the town's congregation travelled to Turners Hill, West Hoathly and other villages around East Grinstead to minister. In 1676, 28 Nonconformists (representing 3.5% of the adult population) were recorded in East Grinstead, although no Baptist meetings were documented.

The completion in 1770 of the London–Brighton turnpike stimulated rapid growth in parts of Sussex in the late 18th century. Although East Grinstead was not on the road, its population grew steadily and it became increasingly important economically. By 1801, more than 2,600 people lived in the town. Nonconformist religious views continued to prosper locally, and in 1810 the town's first non-Anglican church was established. Zion Chapel was linked to the Countess of Huntingdon's Connexion, a small evangelical Calvinist denomination started in 1783 by Selina Hastings, Countess of Huntingdon. John Burt, a rich merchant from nearby Forest Row, founded the church: he provided the money to build it, and on 2 July 1810 his sons laid the foundation stone. Construction work continued until the following year, and the church was officially opened on 23 April 1811. Prominent preacher Rowland Hill spoke at the inaugural service.

In May 1811, a Sunday school was started at the church. It was the first in the area and catered for more than 100 children. By the following year, four times this number attended, and the church itself was also expanding: galleries were added inside to accommodate 200 more worshippers. In 1813, a manse was built next to the church, and further structural alterations were made in 1862 (when a classroom and vestry were built on to the church) and 1880, when the building was reordered and repaired. A tiny burial ground stood in front of the church in its early years; the last burial was in 1846.

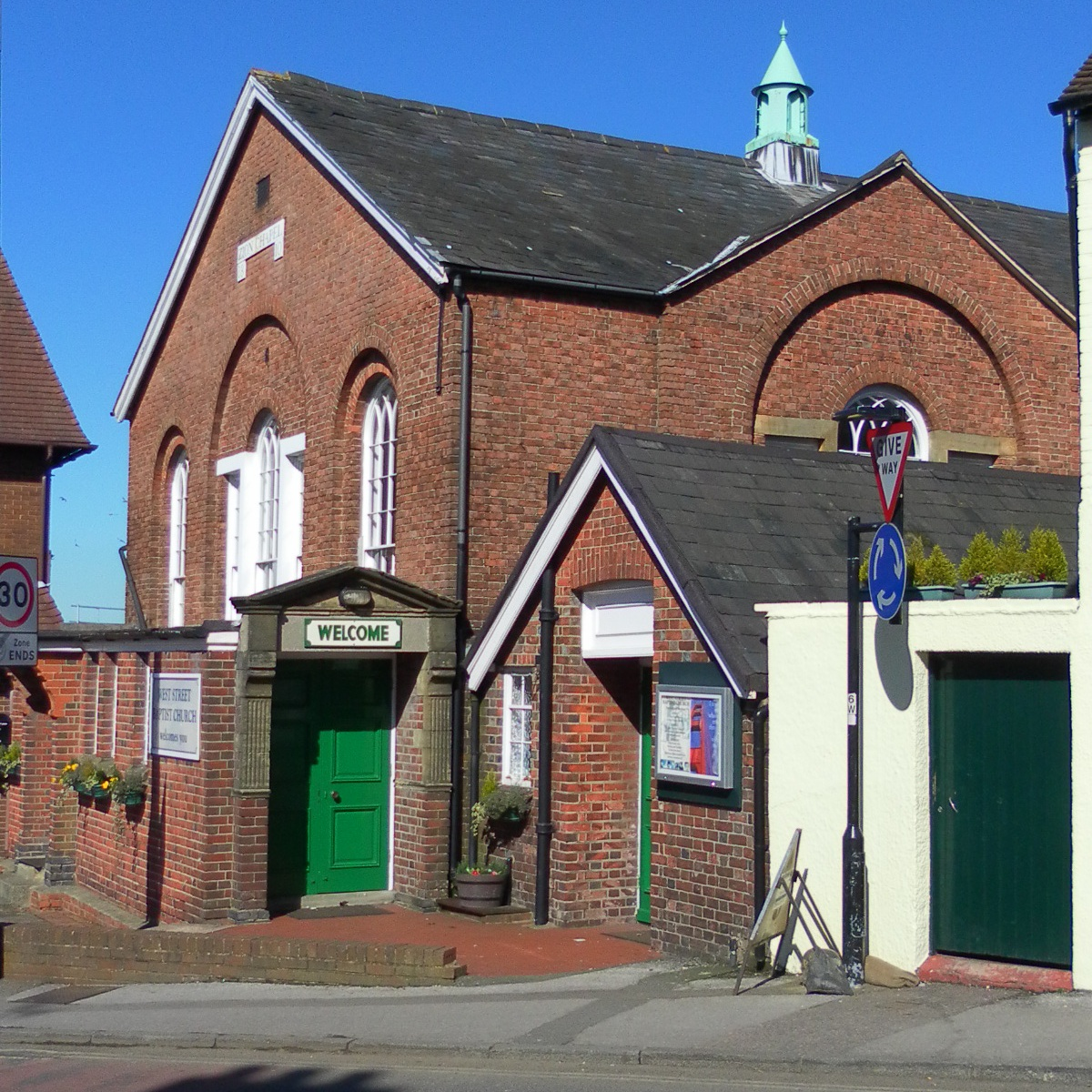
The side elevation of the chapel

Members of Zion Chapel established a daughter church in nearby Turners Hill in 1824. It was rebuilt in 1906 but was still part of the Countess of Huntingdon's Connexion; since then it has become an independent Free Church. In April 1847, a schism occurred in Zion Chapel's congregation: some members left and founded a new Congregational church. After worshipping in hired rooms around East Grinstead, they built Rocks Chapel as their permanent place of worship; the building held its first service on Good Friday 1850. The building was later used by Methodists, but it was demolished after they opened a permanent church of their own. Rocks Chapel stood on Old Road in East Grinstead.

Towards the end of the 1960’s the name was changed from Zion chapel to West Street Evangelical Church, with the aim of engaging more with its location in the town. During the next period, the congregation thrived and there became a need to increase the available useable space. As a result the adjoining derelict manse was demolished and a 2 storey church hall built.

In 1980 a disagreement arose between the Countess of Huntingdon Connexion and the local church congregation. It related to the denominations Articles of Faith, specifically relating to Baptism and the nature of church authority regarding the Pope. In total there were 15 articles, which were drawn up in 1783; and were enrolled in the Court of Chancery in 1793 establishing legal status. By 1981 the situation reached an impasse and the congregation left the chapel and halls and temporarily moved next door into the Red Cross Hall. Latterly the Connexion made legal application and the clauses were finally modified. By then the schism had not been resolved and the congregation moved to another part of the town. Having moved location it changed its name to New Life Church and latterly to Jubilee Community Church. It continues with an unbroken congregation line since 1810.

The Countess of Huntingdon's Connexion sold Zion Chapel in 1980. The following year, members of the town's Providence Strict Baptist Chapel moved in; their former place of worship on London Road was later demolished. Under its present name of West Street Baptist Church, the building houses an evangelical Baptist congregation. It is one of a wide range of religious buildings in East Grinstead, which has a reputation for unusual diversity in respect of both Protestant Nonconformity and alternative religions. As well as Anglican, Roman Catholic, Methodist, Jehovah's Witnesses, Mormon, Baptist and United Reformed churches (and former Quaker, Christian Scientist and Salvation Army buildings), there are several Charismatic evangelical groups in the town; Rosicrucianism and Opus Dei have a presence; and the Church of Scientology's United Kingdom headquarters is at Saint Hill Manor.

Zion Chapel was listed at Grade II on 28 January 1948.

== Architecture ==
The chapel is a small, red-brick building in the Classical style. The brickwork is considered to be of high quality, and the building has been described as "restrained and dignified". The façade has recessed semicircular arched windows and is topped with a pediment of brick, above which is a slate roof. The later extensions to the side and in front changed the character of the building, and the original railings in front do not survive in their original condition.

== See also ==
- List of places of worship in Mid Sussex

== Bibliography ==
- Bridgewater, Peter (2007). An Eccentric Tour of Sussex. Alfriston: Snake River Press. ISBN 978-1-906022-03-7.
- Elleray, D. Robert (2004). Sussex Places of Worship. Worthing: Optimus Books. ISBN 0-9533132-7-1.
- Gwynne, Peter (1990). A History of Crawley (1st ed.). Chichester: Phillimore & Co. ISBN 0-85033-718-6.
- Harris, Roland B. (September 2005). East Grinstead Historic Character Assessment Report (PDF). Sussex Extensive Urban Survey (EUS) (Report). East Sussex County Council, West Sussex County Council, and Brighton and Hove City Council. Archived (PDF) from the original on 10 October 2015.
- Hills, Wallace H. (1906). The History of East Grinstead. Lewes: Farncombe & Co.
- Nairn, Ian; Pevsner, Nikolaus (1965). The Buildings of England: Sussex. Harmondsworth: Penguin Books. ISBN 0-14-071028-0.
