= St Richard's Church, Haywards Heath =

St Richard's Church
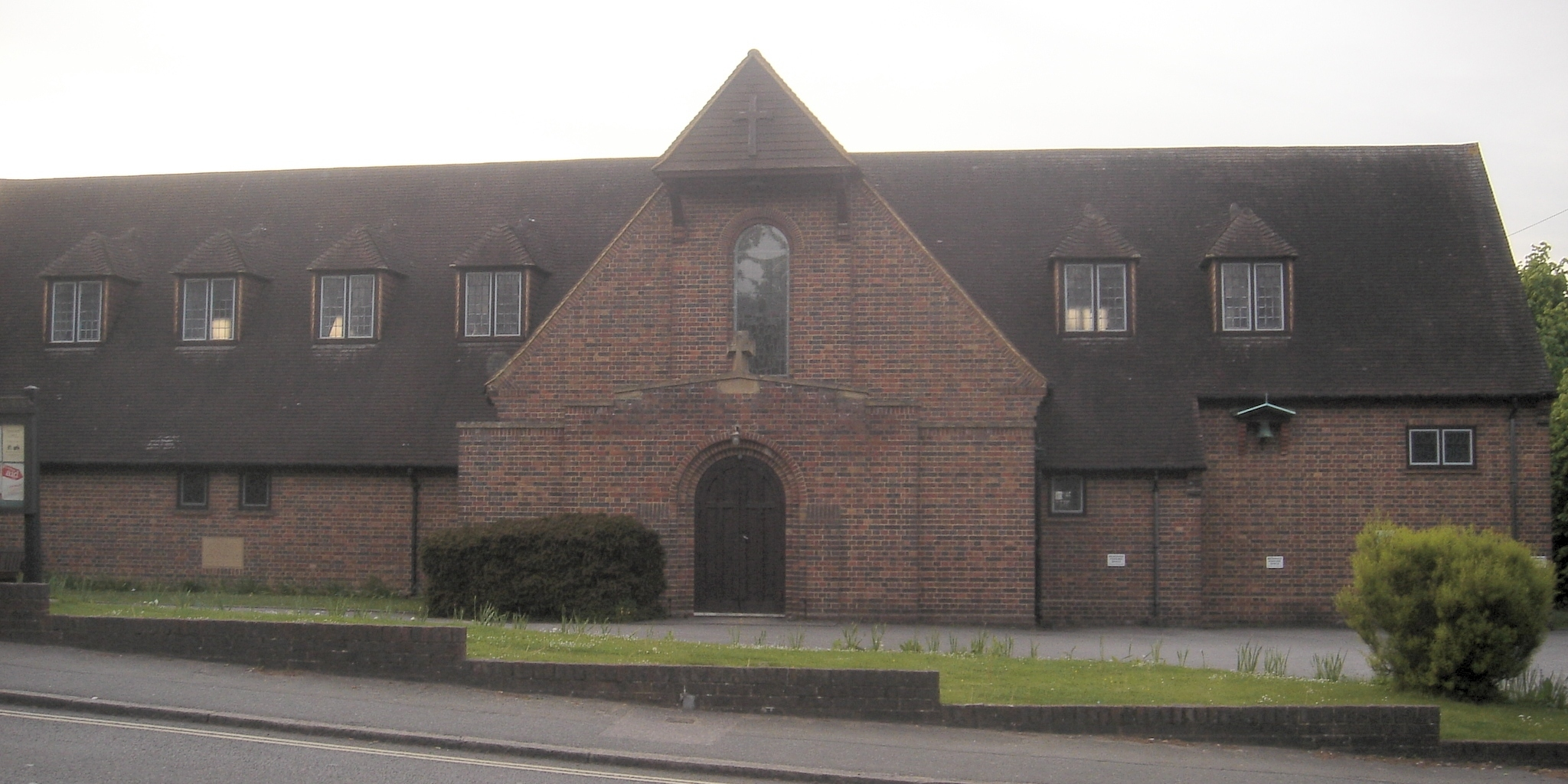
- The church from the south
- St Richard's Church
- 51.0062°N 0.1015°W
- Location: Sydney Road, Haywards Heath, West Sussex RH16 1EB
- Country: England
- Denomination: Church of England
- Churchmanship: Anglo-Catholic

History
- Status: Parish church
- Founded: September 1937
- Founder: Reverend Thomas G. Wyatt
- Dedication: Richard of Chichester
- Consecrated: 1938

Architecture
- Functional status: Active
- Heritage designation: Grade II listed
- Designated: 4 October 2000
- Architect: L. Keir Hett
- Style: Art Deco/Scandinavian
- Groundbreaking: 18 July 1937
- Completed: 1942
- Construction cost: £7,000 (£407,000 in 2025)

Administration
- Province: Canterbury
- Diocese: Chichester
- Archdeaconry: Horsham
- Deanery: Rural Deanery of Cuckfield
- Parish: Haywards Heath, Saint Richard

Clergy
- Vicar: Fr David King SSC

St Richard's Church is an Anglican church in the town of Haywards Heath in the district of Mid Sussex, one of seven local government districts in the English county of West Sussex. The present reinforced concrete and brick structure replaced a temporary building which was a daughter church to Haywards Heath's parish church, St Wilfrid's; the new church soon became parished in its own right to reflect the rapid population growth in the northern part of the town. English Heritage has listed the 1930s building at Grade II for its architectural and historical importance.

== History ==
Haywards Heath's development from an area of heathland with isolated farmhouses into one of central Sussex's largest residential and commercial centres happened after the London and Brighton Railway Company built its London–Brighton railway line through the area in the early 1840s. By 1863, enough money was available to build an Anglican church, which became the centre of a parish covering the whole of the growing settlement. St Wilfrid's Church, south of the railway station, was consecrated in 1865.

More land was required for development, and a long-established but dilapidated farm near the station, Southlands Farm, was bought and demolished in 1888 to make way for new roads and houses linking the commercial area around the station with the road to Lindfield, a neighbouring village. The vicar of St Wilfrid's Church, Reverend Thomas Wyatt, supported the construction of daughter churches, administered from St Wilfrid's, to serve distant parts of the town. One such church, the Chapel of the Holy Spirit, was built in this new residential area in 1897, and became the chapel of ease for the northern side of the parish. Its shape and building material led to it being nicknamed "the tin tabernacle". Its main feature of interest was a pipe organ taken from Lancing College. The small building cost £900 (£101,100 in 2025), of which nearly half was raised through public donations.

As a daughter church to St Wilfrid's, the chapel was served by clergy from there. Its status was changed in 1916, however: the continuing growth of the congregation persuaded the Diocese of Chichester to allocate the church a conventional district (giving it independence from St Wilfrid's) and rename it St Richard's Church. Soon afterwards, a house and its gardens were presented to the church for use as a vicarage. St Richard's Boy's Club was established in its grounds, and a hall was built for the use of the congregation.

The metal church building was always intended to be temporary, and many schemes were put forward for the construction of a permanent church; but no action was taken until 1936. At that time, £500 (£30,600 in 2025) was offered anonymously to the community, on the condition that they raised the same amount by the following Easter. They supported this enthusiastically: within a few months, nearly £5,000 (£306,000 in 2025) had been raised, and the locally based architect L. Keir Hett was commissioned in 1937 to design a new building. The eagerness to proceed with the scheme extended to the children in the St Richard's Boy's Club: the church had to be built in the vicarage garden, and their hut stood in the way, so they demolished it themselves to stop the construction work being delayed.

Hett's design was accepted, and the site was prepared in July 1937. The foundation stone was laid two months later. The Burgess Hill-based building firm Norman and Burt, responsible for several churches in the area, won the building contract. The partly completed church was consecrated in 1938 and took the same dedication (to Richard of Chichester) as its predecessor. The chancel was finished in 1942. The organ from the old church was moved into the new building, but was replaced with a new instrument in the late 1940s. The metal church, parish hall and vicarage were all demolished; a new hall was built behind the church, and the vicarage was re-established on a nearby street.

St Richard's Church was listed at Grade II by English Heritage on 4 October 2000. As at February 2001, it was one of 958 Grade II listed buildings, and 1,028 listed buildings of all grades, in the district of Mid Sussex.

=== Present day ===
St Richard's Church belongs to the Anglo-Catholic tradition of the Church of England. The church is a member of The Society of St Wilfrid and St Hilda, an association for traditionalist Anglo-Catholics that rejects the ordination of women as priests and bishops. As of 2024, the vicar is Fr David King SSC and the parish has a permanent deacon, The Revd Canon Rebecca Swyer.

== Architecture ==
The unusual architectural style of St Richard's Church has been described as having elements of Art Deco and the Scandinavian style. It is also built almost entirely of reinforced concrete—not often found in British churches, but used here on the advice of the Diocese as a cost-saving measure. The church is cruciform, long and low; ribs of reinforced concrete run along its length. The nave is of five bays and has north and south aisles; the chancel has a further three bays; the north transept houses a side chapel, organ gallery and seating for the choir; and there is a baptistery in the south transept, which also has the entrance door. Outside, the entrance area has a steep gabled roof with a small weatherboarded bell-turret: this was provided instead of a tower or steeple. Between the roof and the door is a tall round-arched window. The exterior is of locally made brick laid in the English bond pattern. The roof is tiled and very steeply pitched. There is some stained glass, but the east side has no window at all: it is decorated with a tiled crucifix. Internal fittings include an intricately carved eagle's-head lectern commemorating the end of the First World War, oak pews, stone font, stone and oak pulpit, altar rails and a piscina.

== Parish ==
The parish of St Richard was created in 1939 from parts of the parishes of Cuckfield, Lindfield and St Wilfrid's Church. It covers the northern part of the town, north of the railway station and as far as the boundary with the adjoining village of Lindfield, and some surrounding countryside.

== See also ==
- List of places of worship in Mid Sussex
