= St Paul's Church, Broadoak =

Church in Dorset, England

St Paul's Church
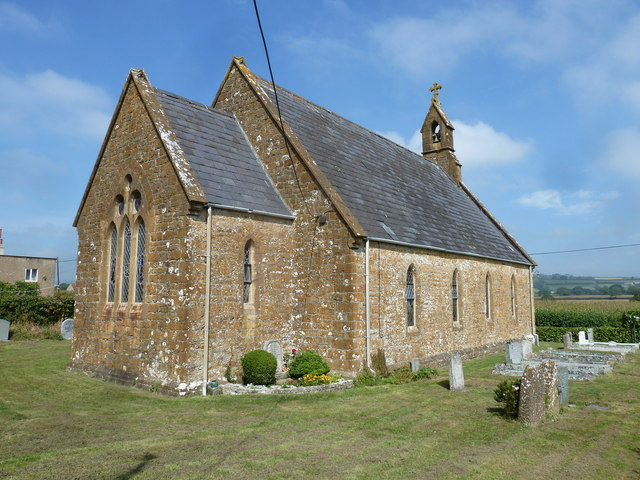

Religion
- Affiliation: Church of England
- Ecclesiastical or organizational status: Active
- Year consecrated: 1866

Location
- Location: Broadoak, Dorset, England
- Interactive map of St Paul's Church
- Coordinates: 50.7634°N 2.7970°W

Architecture
- Architect: Thomas Talbot Bury
- Type: Church

St Paul's Church is a Church of England church in Broadoak, Dorset, England. It was designed by Thomas Talbot Bury and built in 1865–66. The church has been a Grade II listed building since 1984.

== History ==
St Paul's was built as a chapel of ease to the parish church of St John the Baptist in Symondsbury. It was the second chapel of ease to be built in the parish, following St Peter's at Eype, which opened in 1865. Owing to the many outlying settlements and neighbourhoods which were a considerable distance from St John's, the rector of the parish, Rev. Henry Rawlinson, sought to improve church accommodation in the parish. The area of Broakoak was approximately three miles from the parish church, with the nearest church being at Salwayash.

Plans for the church were drawn up by Thomas Talbot Bury of London and a plot of land purchased by Rev. Rawlinson from the trustees of the Bridport Charity. In addition to Broadoak, the church was sited to serve the hamlets of Henwood, Mowerbury, Dinhay, Atram and Hogboar. In addition to donations and subscriptions, a grant of £20 was also received by the Salisbury Diocesan Church Building Society towards its construction.

The foundation stone was laid by Mrs. Sarah Anne Rawlinson, wife of the rector, on 23 March 1865, in the presence of a large number of local clergy and residents. The stone was to have been laid by Mrs. Fooks of Mowerbury, but illness prevented her attendance, and her chosen replacement, Miss Legg of Allington was also unable to attend due to the death of a relative. Mr. William Gibbs of Bradpole was hired as the builder, with Mr. Richard Cornick of Bridport as the contractor, and Mr. W. K. Brown of Bridport handling the plumbing, glazing and woodwork. The completed church was consecrated on 25 April 1866 by the Bishop of Salisbury, the Right Rev. Walter Kerr Hamilton.

== Architecture ==
St Paul's is built of local red sandstone sourced from Stoke Knapp, near Beaminster, with Hamstone used for the quoins and dressings, and slate on the roof. It was designed in the Early English style to accommodate 120 persons, and is made up of a nave and chancel. The west end contains the entrance, an oak door with ornamental ironwork, and a bell turret with a decorated cross finial. The arched braces of the open roof rest on corbels of Hamstone, and the chancel arch is also of the same material. The pulpit, lectern and reading desk are of oak, and the open seats of stained deal.

The north and south sides of the building each have four lancet windows, filled with tinted cathedral glass. The east end has a three-lancet window, with three small circular windows above, and a single lancet window on each side of the chancel. The west end has a two-lancet window with circular and trefoil windows above. The east and west windows, and those on either side of the chancel, were gifted and painted by Mrs. Rawlinson.
