= St John the Evangelist's Church, Burgess Hill =

Historic Anglican church in West Sussex, England

St John the Evangelist's Church
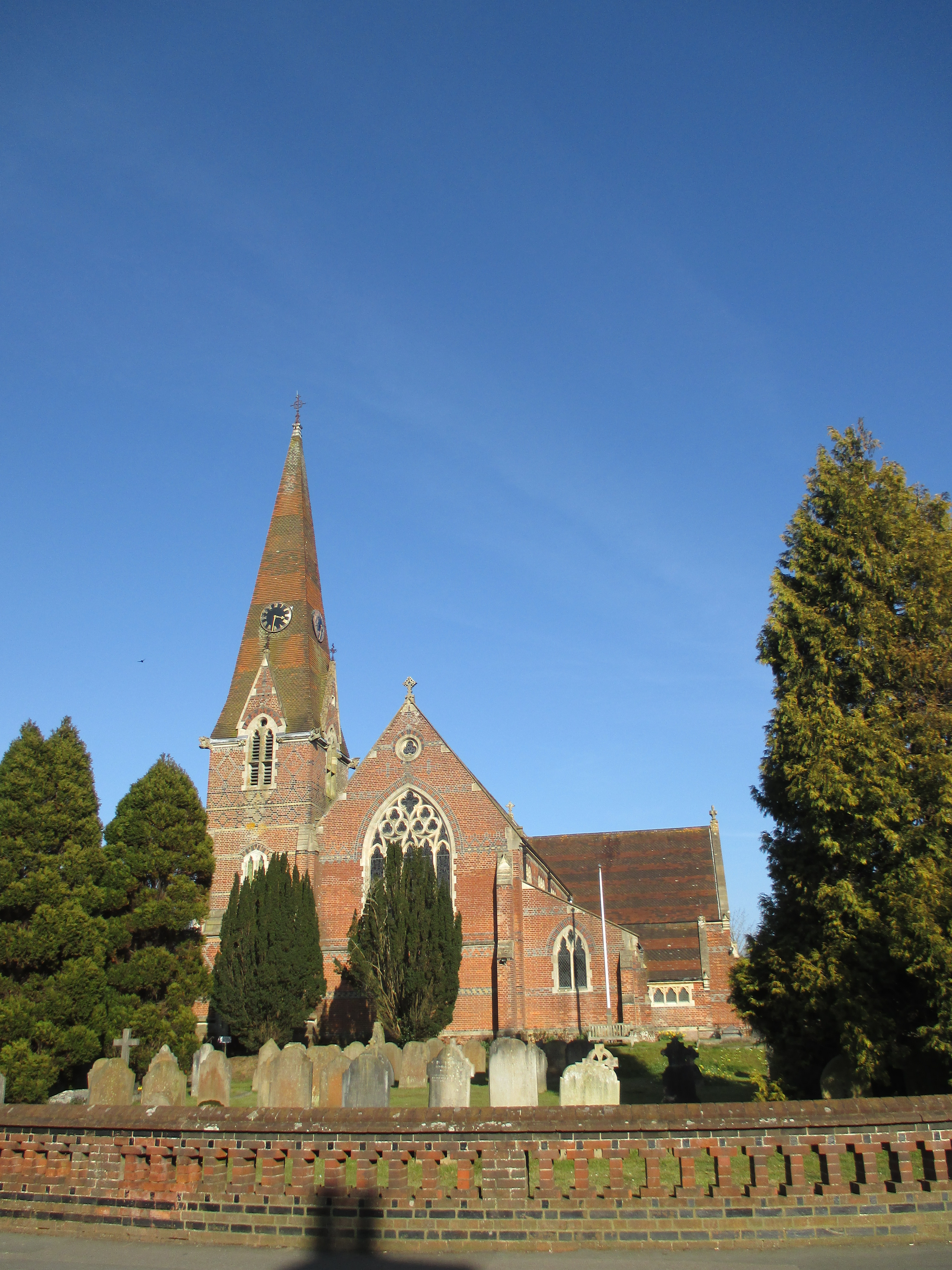
- St John's parish church from the west
- St John the Evangelist's Church
- 50.9573°N 0.1332°W
- Location: St John's Road/Lower Church Road, RH15 9AA Burgess Hill, West Sussex
- Country: England
- Denomination: Church of England
- Website: stjohnsbh.org.uk

History
- Status: Parish church
- Founded: 4 November 1861
- Dedication: John the Evangelist
- Dedicated: June 1865
- Consecrated: June 1863

Architecture
- Functional status: Active
- Heritage designation: Grade II*
- Designated: 22 April 1950
- Architect: Thomas Talbot Bury
- Style: Gothic Revival
- Groundbreaking: October 1861
- Completed: June 1863
- Construction cost: £6,045.3s.3d. (£656,700 in 2025)

Administration
- Province: Canterbury
- Diocese: Chichester
- Archdeaconry: Horsham
- Deanery: Rural Deanery of Hurst
- Parish: Burgess Hill, St John

Clergy
- Vicar: Fr. David Charles

St John the Evangelist's Church is the Church of England parish church of Burgess Hill, West Sussex, England. It is a Gothic Revival church built of local bricks. It was consecrated in 1863 and was the town's first Church of England church. Since then it has administered several other churches in the town as either mission chapels or daughter churches, but all have either closed or been given their own parishes. The church is a Grade II* Listed Building.

== History ==
The area now covered by the town of Burgess Hill was, until the mid-19th century, rural common land that straddled the boundary of the parishes of Clayton and Keymer. The area developed as a settlement after the inclosure act for Keymer's part of St John's Common passed on 18 April 1828 was implemented, and the London and Brighton Railway Company opened its line from a temporary terminus at Haywards Heath to Brighton on 21 September 1841. The line passed through the area of St John's Common and the company opened Burgess Hill railway station on the same day. The railway stimulated residential development and the Keymer Brick and Tile Works, already well-established as Burgess Hill's main industry, was able to expand its sales. The inclosure of Clayton's part of the common was completed in 1857, and the town's growth accelerated.

From the early 1840s, Church of England worship was held in the school in London Road. When inclosure was completed in 1857, its inclosure award provided for 1.5 acres (0.6 hectares) of land to be reserved to build a church. This had been suggested in 1854, when a local newspaper noted that between them the schoolroom, Keymer parish church and Clayton parish church could not cope with the number of worshippers. There was an impasse until 1861: the land reserved for the church turned out to be too far away from where the town centre had developed, and even when a landowner offered 2 acres (0.8 hectares) of undeveloped land in the town centre free of charge, agreement was not reached. A group of landowners in Clayton parish was so angry at the proposal to move the church away from the site set by the inclosure act award that they took out a newspaper advertisement in July 1861 protesting against any change to this plan. They were ultimately unsuccessful, and building of the church began on the donated land. Thomas Talbot Bury had been commissioned to design it, and a building firm from Chichester submitted the successful bid for the building work. The Bishop of Chichester, Ashurst Turner Gilbert, laid the foundation stone on 4 November 1861, and building work continued until June 1863, when the church was consecrated.

For its first two years the church was a chapel of ease jointly held by the Parishes of Clayton and Keymer; but in June 1865 it was given its own parish and was dedicated to John the Evangelist. Its capacity was about 700 people. About half of the pews were subject to pew rents, which paid the vicar's stipend.

Few changes have been made since the church was opened. Talbot Bury designed a south aisle that was added in 1875, and a vestry was added in 1889. A vicarage was built in nearby Park Road in 1907 after a local doctor presented some land to the church. Late in the 20th century the north transept and aisle were separated by a screen from the rest of the church, to allow alternative use of the space; this was formalised by the Diocese of Chichester in 1989.

Annie Mackintosh, the mother of Antarctic explorer Aeneas Mackintosh, is buried in the churchyard. Her grave includes a memorial to her son, who disappeared in the Antarctic in 1916.

== Associated churches ==
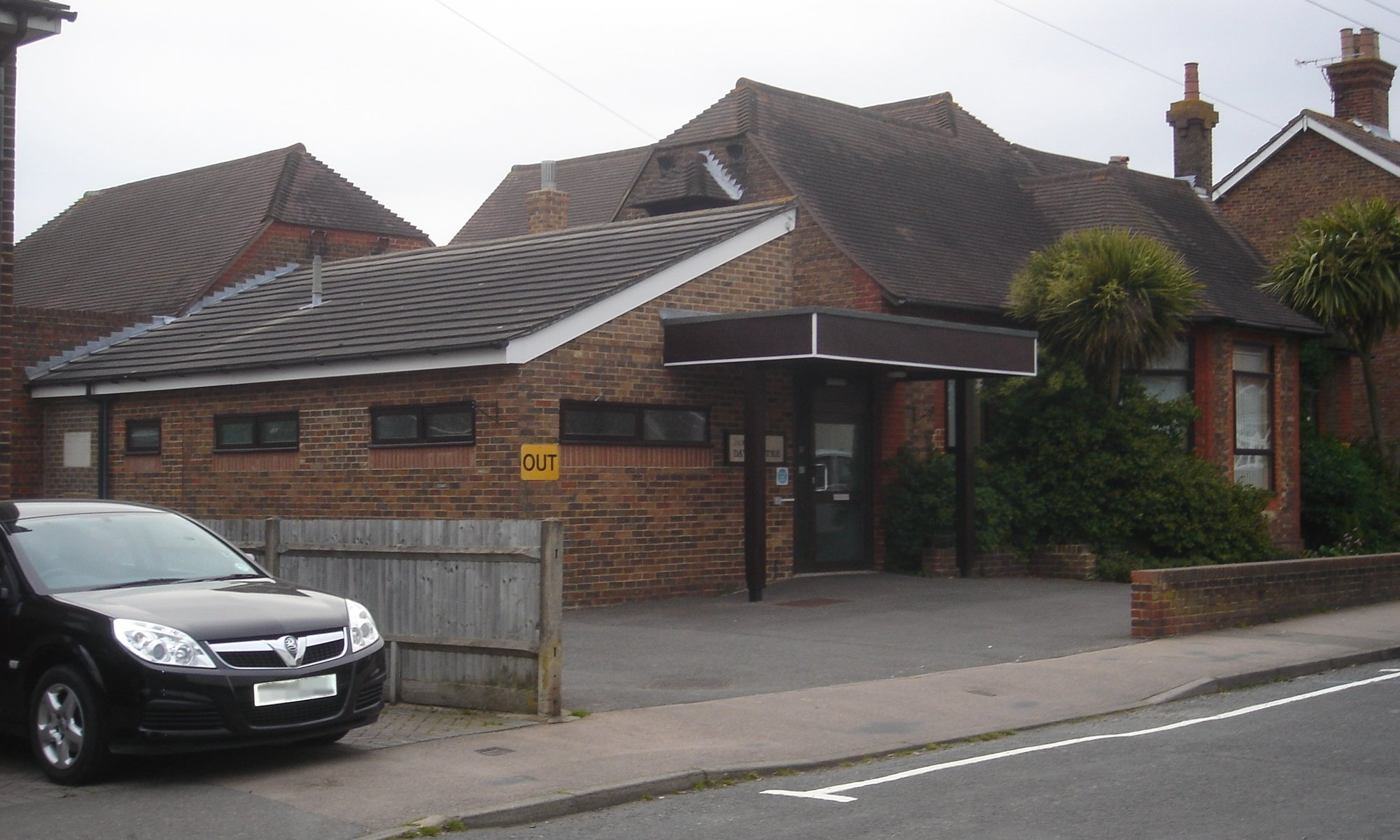
The former St Alban's Mission Hall

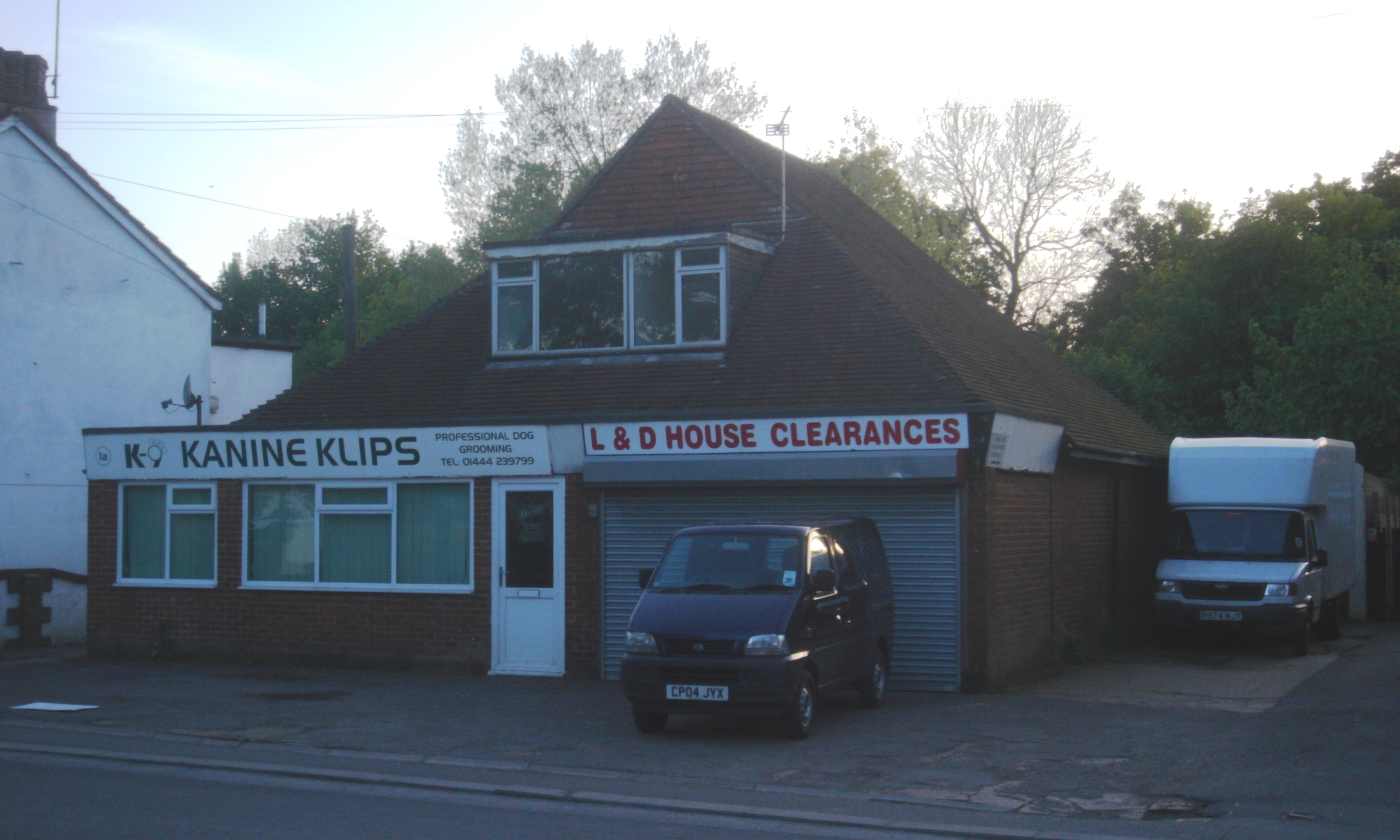
World's End's former Mission Hall

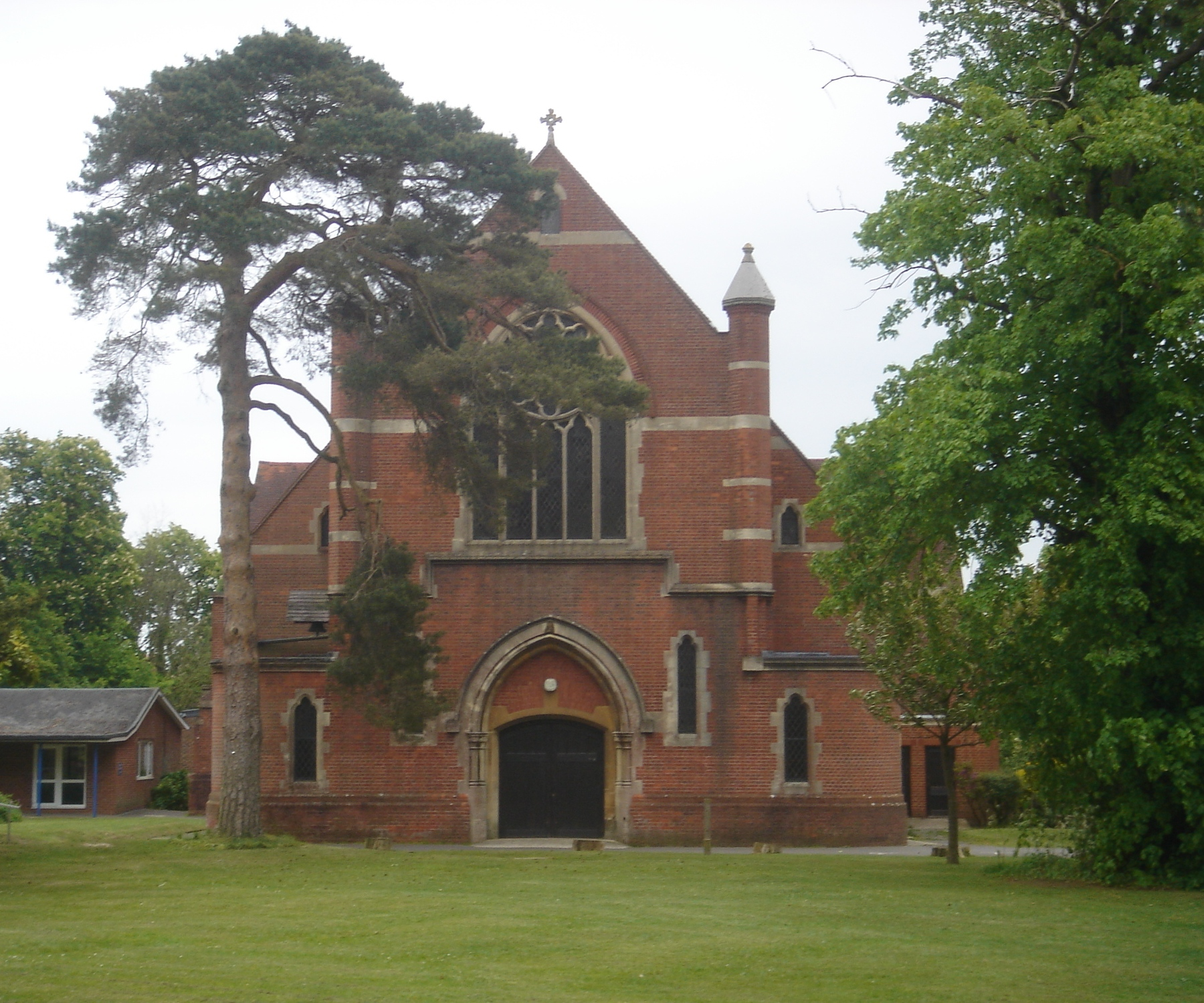
St Andrew's parish church

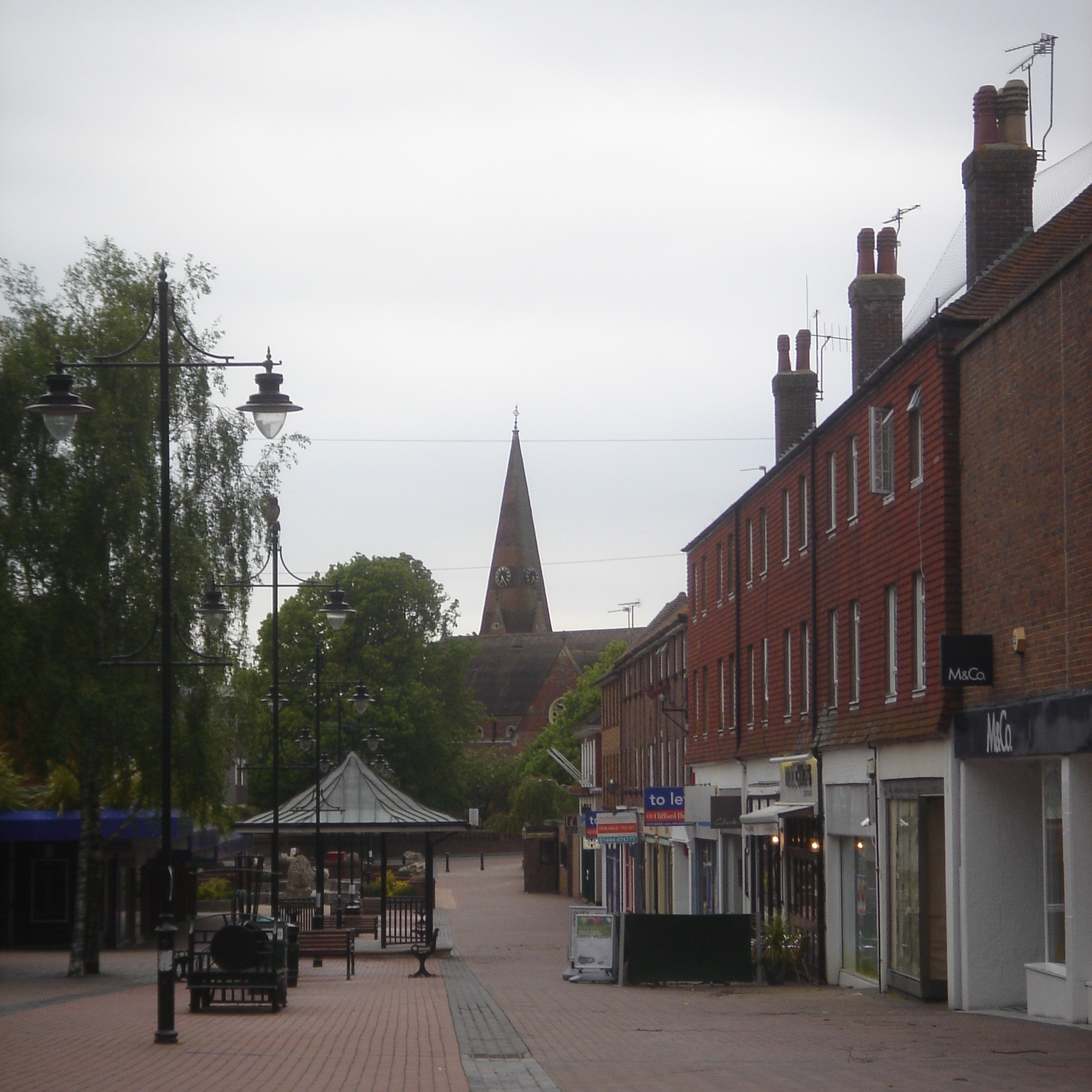
St John's parish church and steeple seen from Church Walk to the south

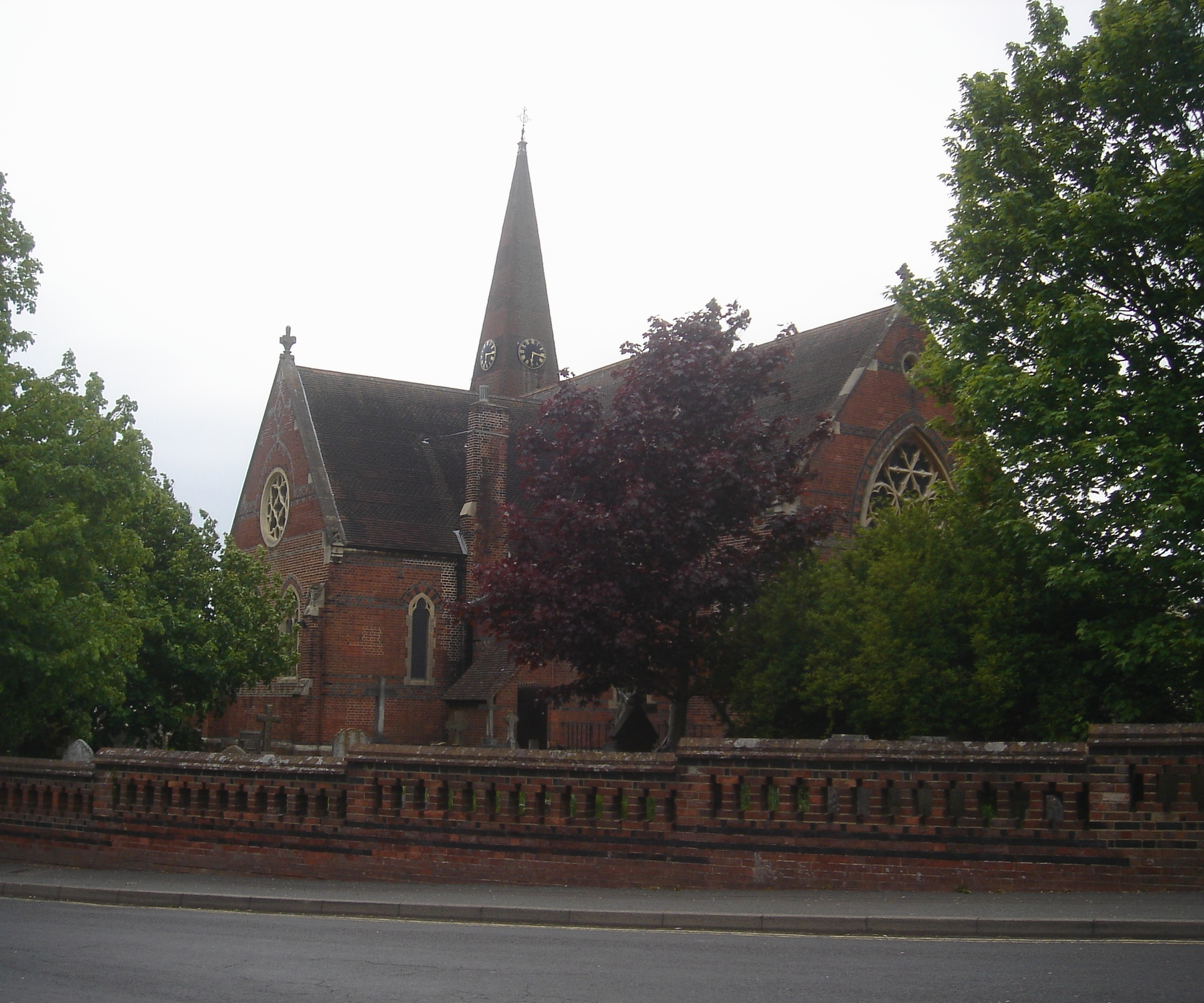
St John's parish church from the southeast

The growth of the town in the late 19th century — particularly to the northeast and west, some way from the church — prompted the opening of two mission chapels in the 1880s. Two permanent churches were built later, and have since been given their own parishes.

St Alban's Mission Hall was Burgess Hill's first mission room. It was in Fairfield Road on the Clayton side (west side) of the ecclesiastical parish, and was built in 1885 at a cost of £324 (£36,000 as at 2025) to provide extra capacity in that area. Its popularity led to an extension being added in 1907, and services were held for much of the 20th century. The building survives but it is now an Age Concern day centre.

Two years later Somers Clarke gave money for the building of a second mission hall to serve the northeastern part of the town, which had developed quickly after Wivelsfield railway station was reopened on a new site in 1886. The area had acquired the name World's End when the railway was being built. The World's End Mission Room housed a reading room, schoolroom and accommodation for worshippers, but it fell out of use after a new corrugated iron church was built in 1899 nearby. It was on the land of Sampson Copestake, a local businessman, who gave money and more land to build a permanent church. The old mission hall was converted into two shops.

In 1902 a separate parish was formed from portions of the parishes of St John the Evangelist and Ditchling. It was named St Andrew's, and building of a permanent church with that dedication, to replace the earlier iron church, began soon afterwards. It was consecrated on 30 November 1908 in an incomplete state: the liturgical east end was eventually completed in 1924, and the planned tower was never built. St Andrew's Church, designed by Lacy W. Ridge, is a Gothic Revival red brick building with some exterior stonework. The nave is very wide and lacks aisles.

St Edward the Confessor Church is at the west end of the town, in Burgess Hill's main cemetery. A small Perpendicular Gothic-style stone cemetery chapel was built in the early 20th century; this later was made a place of Sunday worship run from St John the Evangelist's. A modern brick-built extension was added in 1968, and it was given its own parish in 2000.

== Building ==
Thomas Talbot Bury designed St John the Evangelist's parish church in a 13th-century Decorated Gothic style with elements of the Geometrical style. It is built of red brick with large areas of yellow and black brick, and there are stone dressings on parts of the exterior. The brickwork is in Flemish bond, and the roof is tiled. The plan comprises a 3½-bay nave, chancel, clerestory, north and south aisles and transepts, entrance porch to the south and three-stage tower to the northwest, topped by a tall tiled spire.

Trefoil windows predominate. The middle and upper stages of the tower have paired lancet windows with trefoils above; the large nave window in the west end has five trefoils. Various combinations of trefoils and doubled or tripled lancets are also found in the aisles, chancel, transepts and porch. The clerestory differs in its use of groups of two and three quatrefoils — an arrangement that Ian Nairn called "odd".

The nave has a king post arched roof supported by octagonal columns. The chancel roof is similar but more sophisticated in its design. The north aisle is cross-gabled.

An oak-carved pulpit commemorates Simeon Norman, one of Burgess Hill's prominent 19th-century residents, who built the Grade II-listed Providence Strict Baptist Chapel. An oak lectern was donated as a memorial to another local family. Frederick Crunden, who gave money to the building fund, helped to decorate the church interior and later gave the land for the vicarage, also has memorials inside the church. Other fittings include an altar of stone and marble, an ornate chancel screen and an octagonal font. The original pews have been retained. The Franz Mayer & Co. stained glass company designed some of the windows, and another commemorates a local doctor who had donated the organ.

=== Clock and bells ===
The spire has a clock with four faces, installed in 1887 for the Golden Jubilee of Queen Victoria.

The tower has a ring of eight bells, all cast by John Taylor & Co of Loughborough. The tenor, sixth and fourth bells were cast for Queen Victoria's Diamond Jubilee in 1897; the seventh and fifth bells were cast in 1900 and the third, second and treble bells were cast in 1904.

== Child abuse convictions ==
On 5 April 2013 Hove Crown Court convicted musician Michael Mytton and retired priest the Revd Keith Wilkie Denford of sexually assaulting boys between 1987 and 1994 when Mytton had been organist and Denford had been vicar of St John the Evangelist's. Denford was jailed for 18 months and Mytton was given a suspended jail term.

St John's had employed Mytton despite his having been forced to leave a parish in Uckfield in 1981 because he was convicted of committing two acts of gross indecency with a 12-year-old boy. When arrested for the offences he committed at St John's, Mytton told Sussex Police "I like boys. If I was a straight gay, life would be a lot easier. I like boys, I know I like boys and it has cost me everything."

Both men pleaded not guilty. Hove Crown Court convicted Mytton of committing offences between 1992 and 1994 and convicted Wilkie Denford of committing offences between 1987 and 1990. The convictions are part of a wider scandal of past child abuse in the Diocese of Chichester.

== Present ==
St John the Evangelist's Church has been a Grade II* Listed Building since 22 April 1950. As at February 2001 it was one of 54 Grade II* listed buildings in the Mid Sussex District.

St John the Evangelist's is now one of three Church of England parishes in Burgess Hill. St Andrew's parish, established in 1902, serves the east side of the town, and St Edward the Confessor's's parish (created in 2000) serves the west side; St John the Evangelist's parish church now serves for the central part of the town between the railway line and the A23 London Road, and some residential estates in the south of the town.

St John's celebrates the Eucharist twice each Sunday morning. It celebrates the Eucharist also on Wednesdays.

== See also ==
- List of places of worship in Mid Sussex

== Bibliography ==
- Avery, Frederic M. (2001). Burgess Hill in Old Picture Postcards. Vol. 2. Zaltbommel: European Library. ISBN 90-288-3562-8.
- Body, Geoffrey (1984). Railways of the Southern Region. PSL Field Guides. Cambridge: Patrick Stephens Ltd. ISBN 0-85059-664-5.
- Dudeney, Mark; Hallett, Eileen (2003). Bygone Days in Burgess Hill. Burgess Hill: Mid-Sussex Books. ISBN 0-9530625-2-X.
- Elleray, D. Robert (2004). Sussex Places of Worship. Worthing: Optimus Books. ISBN 0-9533132-7-1.
- Matthews, Hugh (2006). Burgess Hill. Additional chapter by Mark Dudeney (2nd ed.). Chichester: Phillimore & Co. Ltd. ISBN 1-86077-437-7.
- Nairn, Ian; Pevsner, Nikolaus (1965). Sussex. The Buildings of England. Harmondsworth: Penguin Books. ISBN 0-14-071028-0.
- Salzman, L.F., ed. (1940). "Parishes: Keymer". A History of the County of Sussex: Volume 7 – The Rape of Lewes. British History Online. pp. 179–181.
