= St Wilfrid's Church, Haywards Heath =

St Wilfrid's Church
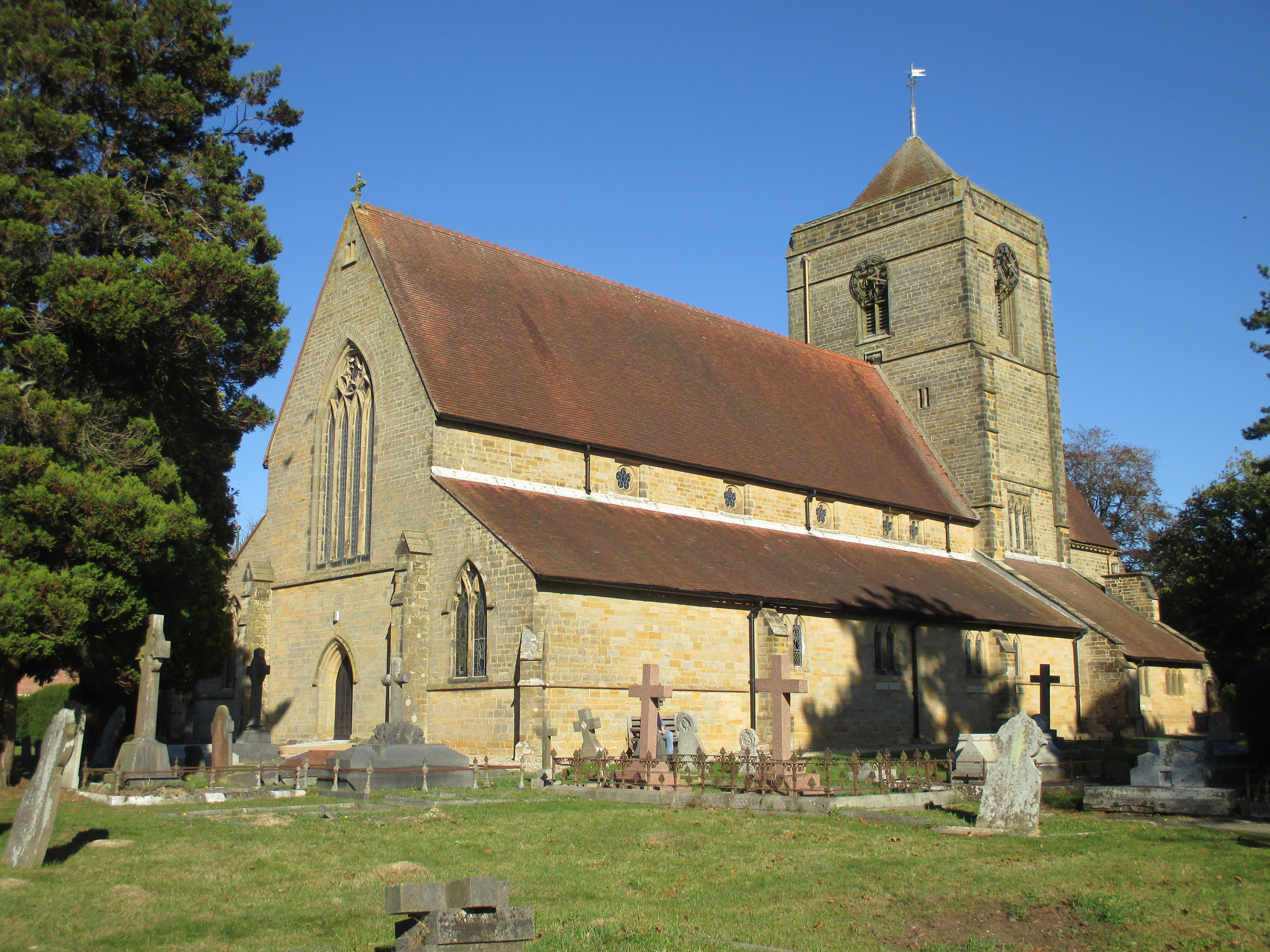
- The church from the south-west
- St Wilfrid's Church
- 50.9992°N 0.1046°W
- OS grid reference: TQ 33098 23915
- Location: Church Road, Haywards Heath, West Sussex
- Country: England
- Denomination: Church of England
- Churchmanship: Liberal Catholic

History
- Status: Parish church
- Founded: 12 October 1863
- Founder(s): Anne and Frances Dealtry
- Dedication: Wilfrid
- Consecrated: 1865

Architecture
- Functional status: Active
- Heritage designation: Grade II* listed
- Designated: 10 September 1951
- Architect: George Frederick Bodley
- Style: Decorated Gothic
- Groundbreaking: 1863
- Completed: 1865
- Construction cost: £6,000 (£652,000 in 2025)

Administration
- Province: Canterbury
- Diocese: Chichester
- Archdeaconry: Horsham
- Deanery: Rural Deanery of Cuckfield
- Parish: Haywards Heath, Saint Wilfrid

Clergy
- Rector: Fr Edward Pritchett

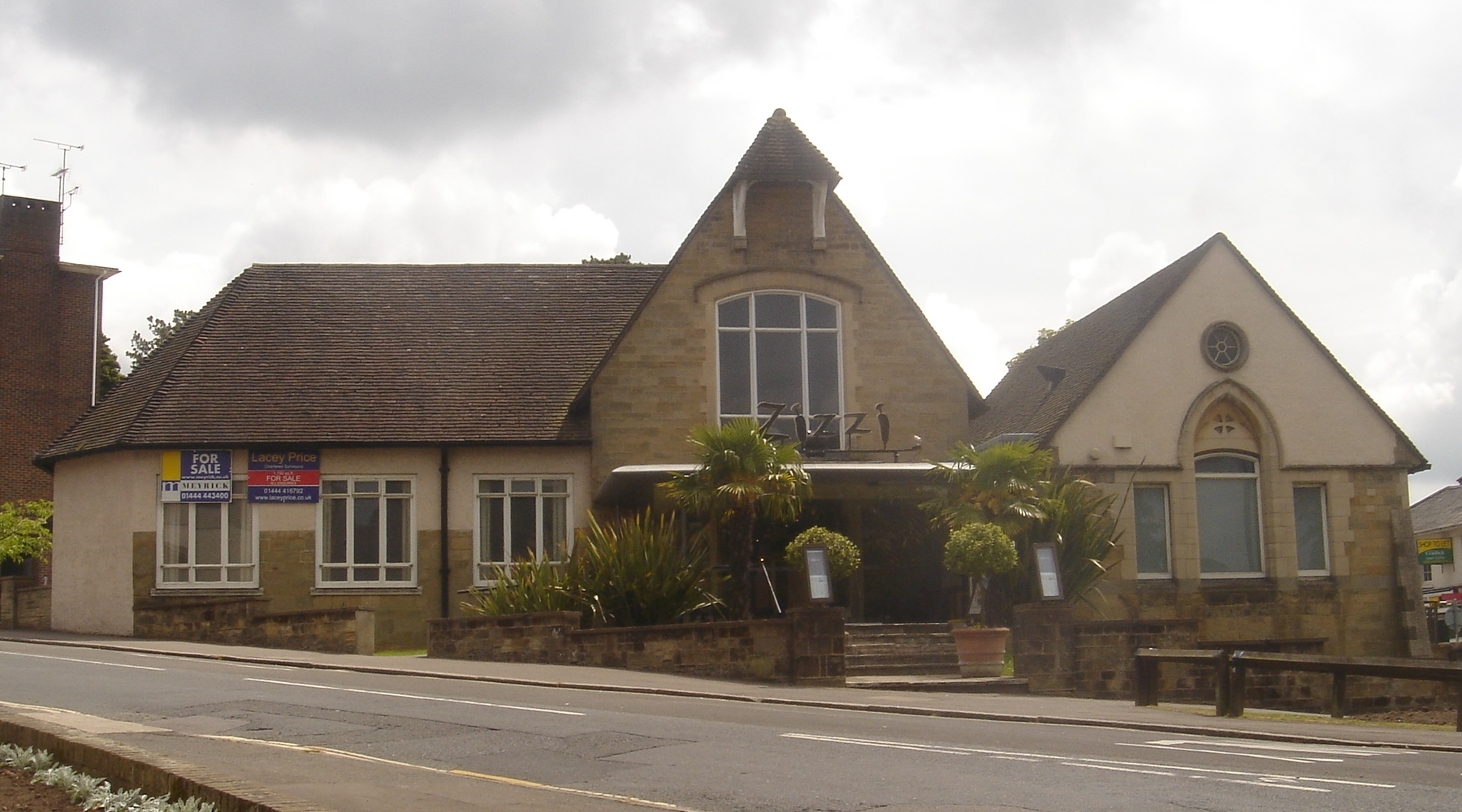
The former St Wilfrid's School—briefly used for Anglican worship before the church was built

St Wilfrid's Church is an Anglican church in the town of Haywards Heath in the district of Mid Sussex, one of seven local government districts in the English county of West Sussex. It is Haywards Heath's parish church, and is the mother church to two of the town's four other Anglican churches. Designed in the Decorated Gothic style by George Frederick Bodley, it was built between 1863 and 1865 as the town began to grow rapidly, and stands in a prominent position on the highest ground in the area. English Heritage has listed it at Grade II* for its architectural and historical importance.

== History ==
Until the mid-19th century, Haywards Heath—now a town of 30,000 people—did not exist as a settlement. In the medieval period, the area was heathland supporting some small farms and crossed by roads to the nearby villages of Cuckfield and Lindfield—both of which had churches by the 12th century. The heath itself was first named in documents in the early 16th century. It was used to muster troops during the Restoration, when King Charles II re-established the English monarchy, and as a venue for the sale of pigs. Most of the land belonged to large estates held by influential local families.

In the early 19th century, railway-building techniques were pioneered. One of the first routes planned in England was a connection between London and the fashionable seaside resort of Brighton, about 50 miles (80 km) to the south. Various routes were proposed between 1823 and 1837, when John Urpeth Rastrick's plan for a direct route via Cuckfield was agreed as part of the London and Brighton Railway Act 1837 (7 Will. 4 & 1 Vict. c. cxix), which created the London and Brighton Railway Company. However, many residents of both Cuckfield and Lindfield objected to the route: although it was preferred to George Stephenson's suggested route further to the west, which was considered too far away from the villages, it was argued that instead of running through one village or the other, the line should pass through the mostly unoccupied heathland between them. After this was agreed in 1837, construction work proceeded rapidly, and the London and Brighton Railway opened between Norwood (the junction with the London and Croydon Railway to London Bridge) and a temporary terminus at Haywards Heath on 12 July 1841. The extension to Brighton followed on 21 September 1841.

The station offered rapid travel to London and Brighton, and was surrounded by low-grade, mostly empty land. Within 20 years, residential and commercial development had been stimulated and the population—about 100 in 1841—had risen significantly. An inclosure act of 1858 released more land for development; the heath was fully enclosed in 1861. At this time there was no permanent Anglican place of worship, and the growing town was administered as part of the Parish of Cuckfield. The venue for Haywards Heath's first Anglican services was the loft of a carpenter's workshop on Milton Road near the station. Worshippers had to climb a ladder to get into the room. Clergy from Cuckfield held these services for several years, until Reverend Robert Wyatt moved from Staffordshire to Haywards Heath and took on the ministry, starting the Wyatt family's 74-year association with Anglican worship in the town. In 1856, two unmarried sisters, Anne and Frances Dealtry, who lived locally in a mansion called Bolnore, paid for the construction of Haywards Heath's first school. It was decided that the building should be used for religious services as well; the first was held in December 1856, and children enrolled at the school (named St Wilfrid's) from 1857.

Soon after this, plans were made to build a permanent church for the community. A site to the east of the school, at the highest point on the heath, was chosen. The Dealtry sisters laid the foundation stone on 12 October 1863 (St Wilfrid's Day). Architect George Frederick Bodley had been commissioned by the Vicar of Cuckfield to design the church; the builder was John Fabian. It was completed in under two years at a cost of £6,000 (equivalent to £652,000 in 2025). The stone used to build the church, quarried just outside the town, was donated free. The Bishop of Chichester, Ashurst Turner Gilbert, consecrated St Wilfrid's Church on Whit Monday in 1865.

More work was carried out in the following decades. Vestries and an organ were added in 1880; Bodley added a clerestory in the nave in 1890; a clock was added in one face of the tower; the churchyard was extended in 1899; and a lychgate was added at its southern entrance in 1909.

On 20 February 1866 an Order in Council designated a part of the Parish of Cuckfield as "the District Chapelry of St Wilfrid, Cuckfield"—this gave the church something close to parish status, though legally it remained part of the Parish of Cuckfield. By a further Order on 31 May 1910, the advowson was transferred from the Vicar of Cuckfield to the Diocese of Chichester. This also had the effect of turning the chapelry into a parish in its own right, and on 4 May 1911 the parish was extended, taking in more of the Parish of Uckfield, and also part of the Parish of Lindfield. Reverend Robert Wyatt was the first incumbent; he served for 35 years, and was succeeded by his son who was the incumbent for a further 39 years. The churchyard was no longer used for burials after 1918: a new cemetery had been established elsewhere in the town.

St Wilfrid's Church was listed at Grade II* by English Heritage on 10 September 1951. As at February 2001, it was one of 54 Grade II* listed buildings, and 1,028 listed buildings of all grades, in the district of Mid Sussex.

== Architecture ==
St Wilfrid's Church was built in the Decorated Gothic style, popular in the mid-19th century. Locally quarried sandstone was the main building material; the roof was tiled. The nave is of five bays with buttressed north and south aisles and a clerestory, lit by quatrefoil and cinquefoil (four- and five-lobed) windows. A single-bay chancel leads off from the nave. The tower, praised by Nikolaus Pevsner, rises in three stages and is topped with a shallow octagonal cap. It is supported internally on transverse arches. William Morris provided some stained glass depicting saints, and the east window has an Expressionist design of the early 1960s. Some of the stained glass was apparently restored by Hove-based firm Cox & Barnard.

Memorials in the church include a lectern in the shape of an eagle, for Queen Victoria's Golden Jubilee in 1887; a cross in the churchyard, dedicated in 1903 to local victims of the Second Boer War; an altar piece commemorating the London Rifle Brigade, who used the church when they were based in Haywards Heath during World War I; stained glass depicting soldiers in combat and in hospital during the same war; and a brass plaque in memory of John Mason Neale, warden of Sackville College in nearby East Grinstead who also translated and wrote many hymns and carols, including "Good King Wenceslas".

== Parish ==
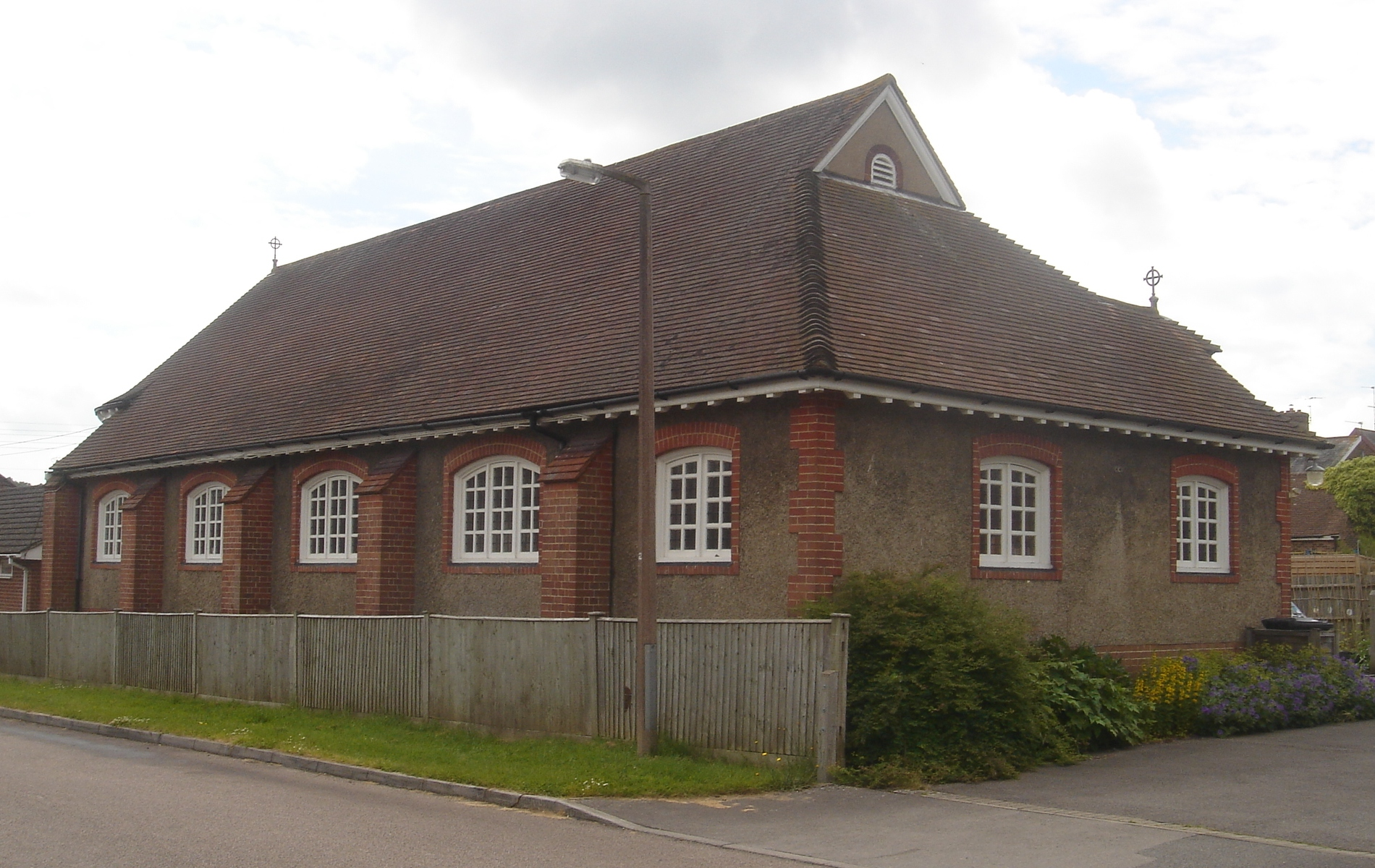
Church of the Presentation

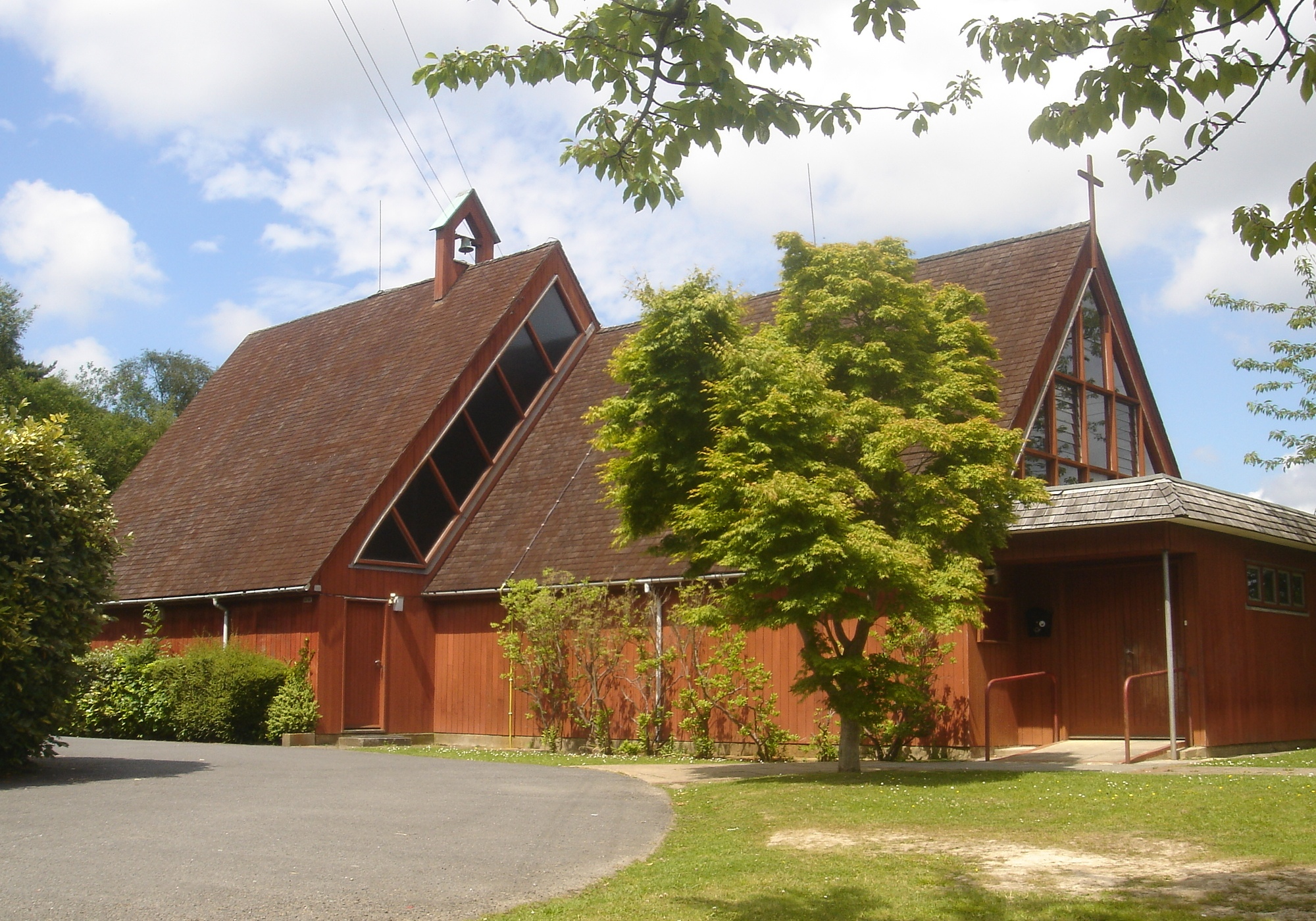
Church of the Good Shepherd

The parish of St Wilfrid covers a large part of the south side of Haywards Heath and the surrounding countryside, and until 2003 included two daughter churches—one of which was outside its boundary. The newly developed Bolnore Village estate, which does not have its own church, is part of the parish.

The Church of the Presentation on New England Road, Haywards Heath's second Anglican church, had its origins in a temporary iron building opened on 15 August 1882. It grew enough to justify an extension in 1886 and a permanent brick building in 1897. This had a capacity of 170 and was opened in August of that year. The iron building which it replaced survived as a church hall until the late 20th century.

The Church of the Good Shepherd, on the Franklands Village housing estate in the east of the town, was built in 1964–65 by architect William Newman. Before that, services had been held in the estate's Village Hall. The timber-walled building has large areas of glass and steep roofs. It was made redundant as a place of worship in 2003, and the area previously covered by the church is now served by the Church of the Ascension. There are plans to use the building for the benefit of the community of Franklands Village.

== See also ==
- List of places of worship in Mid Sussex

== Bibliography ==
- Body, Geoffrey (1984). Railways of the Southern Region. PSL Field Guides. Cambridge: Patrick Stephens Ltd. ISBN 0-85059-664-5.
- Elleray, D. Robert (2004). Sussex Places of Worship. Worthing: Optimus Books. ISBN 0-9533132-7-1.
- Ford, Wyn K.; Gabe, A.C. (1981). The Metropolis of Mid Sussex: a History of Haywards Heath. Haywards Heath: Charles Clarke (Haywards Heath) Ltd. ISBN 0-9502489-4-0.
- Jackson, Wilfrid (2005). Haywards Heath: a History and Celebration. Teffont: The Francis Frith Collection. ISBN 1-84589-205-4.
- Nairn, Ian; Pevsner, Nikolaus (1965). The Buildings of England: Sussex. Harmondsworth: Penguin Books. ISBN 0-14-071028-0.
- Smith, Nickola (1993). Haywards Heath in Old Picture Postcards. Zaltbommel: European Library. ISBN 90-288-5690-0.
