= Thomas Talbot Bury =

British architect and lithographer

- Born: 26 November 1809; Worcestershire
- Died: 23 February 1877 (aged 67); Cavendish Square, London
- Occupation: Architect

Thomas Talbot Bury (26 November 1809 – 23 February 1877) was a British architect and lithographer. There seems to be some dispute about Bury's date of birth. According to Grace's Guide, the 1877 Institution of Civil Engineers Obituaries gives a DOB as 26 September 1811, the Directory of British Architects 1834-1914 Vol.1 and the Library of Congress agree. The Royal Academy gives a date of simply 1809 and the Science Museum agrees with them.

Bury was articled to Augustus Charles Pugin in 1824 and started his own practice in Soho in 1830. At various times he collaborated with other notable architects including Charles Lee (partners between 1845 and 1849), Lewis Vulliamy and A. W. N. Pugin, with whom he detailed the Houses of Parliament under Sir Charles Barry.

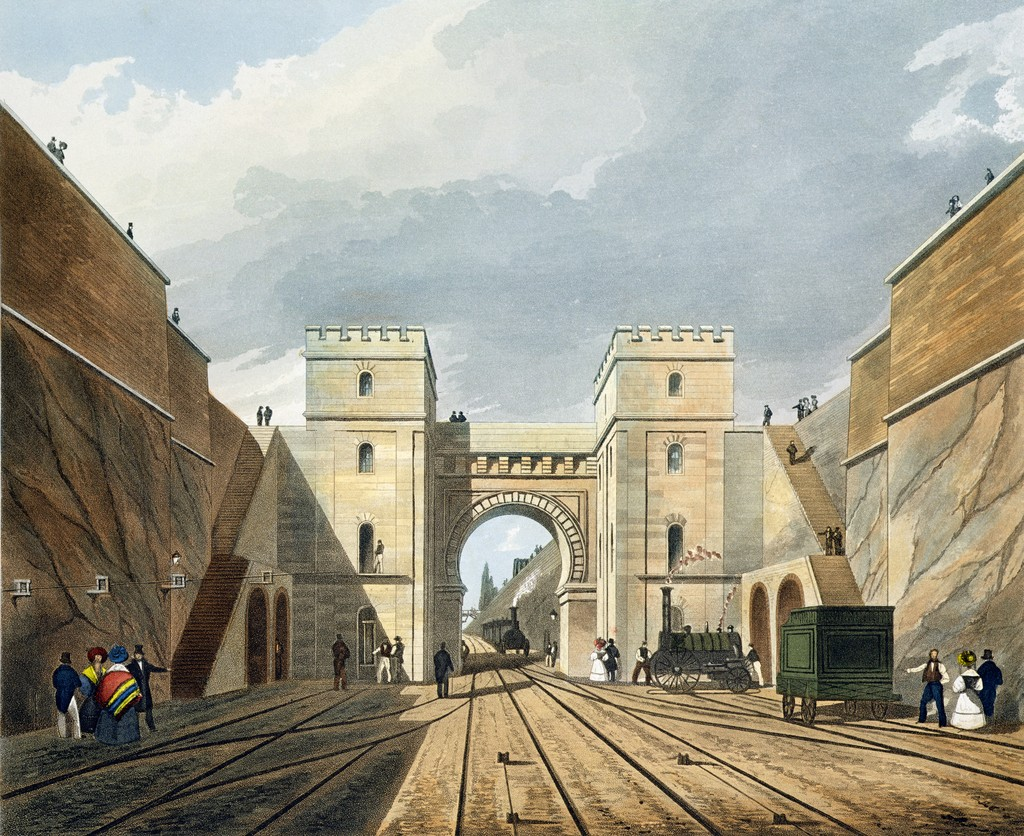
Bury's watercolour of the Moorish Arch at Edge Hill

Bury's works included thirty-five churches and chapels, fifteen parsonages, twelve schools and twenty other large public buildings and private homes. His ecclesiastical works included St Mary the Virgin's Church, Woodlands (near West Kingsdown), Kent (1850); the chapels at Tonbridge cemetery (1856); St James's Church, Dover, (1859); St Ann's Church, Tottenham, (1861); St John the Evangelist's Church in Burgess Hill, West Sussex, (1861–63); St Paul's Church, Broadoak (1866); St Mary's, Lambourn Woodlands and Welford St Gregory, both near Newbury, Berkshire. He also carried out a restoration of St Peter and St Paul's Church at Temple Ewell near Dover.

Bury was also known for his engravings and lithography, notably of the works of Augustus Welby Pugin and Owen Jones. He exhibited at the Royal Academy between 1846 and 1872, and was noted for the sketches he produced for Ackermann's series of lithographs and aquatints of the "Coloured Views of the Liverpool and Manchester Railway", in 1831, republished in 1976.

Bury was made a Fellow of the RIBA in 1843 and was elected vice-president in 1876. He was also a Fellow of the Society of Antiquaries, a council member of the Royal Archaeological Institute of Great Britain and Ireland and an associate of the Society of Civil Engineers.

Bury died at his home in Cavendish Square, London and is buried at West Norwood Cemetery.

== Sources ==
- Tregellas, W. H. (2004). "Bury, Thomas Talbot", in Oxford Dictionary of National Biography. Oxford University Press.
