= St Cosmas and St Damian Church, Keymer =

St Cosmas and St Damian Church
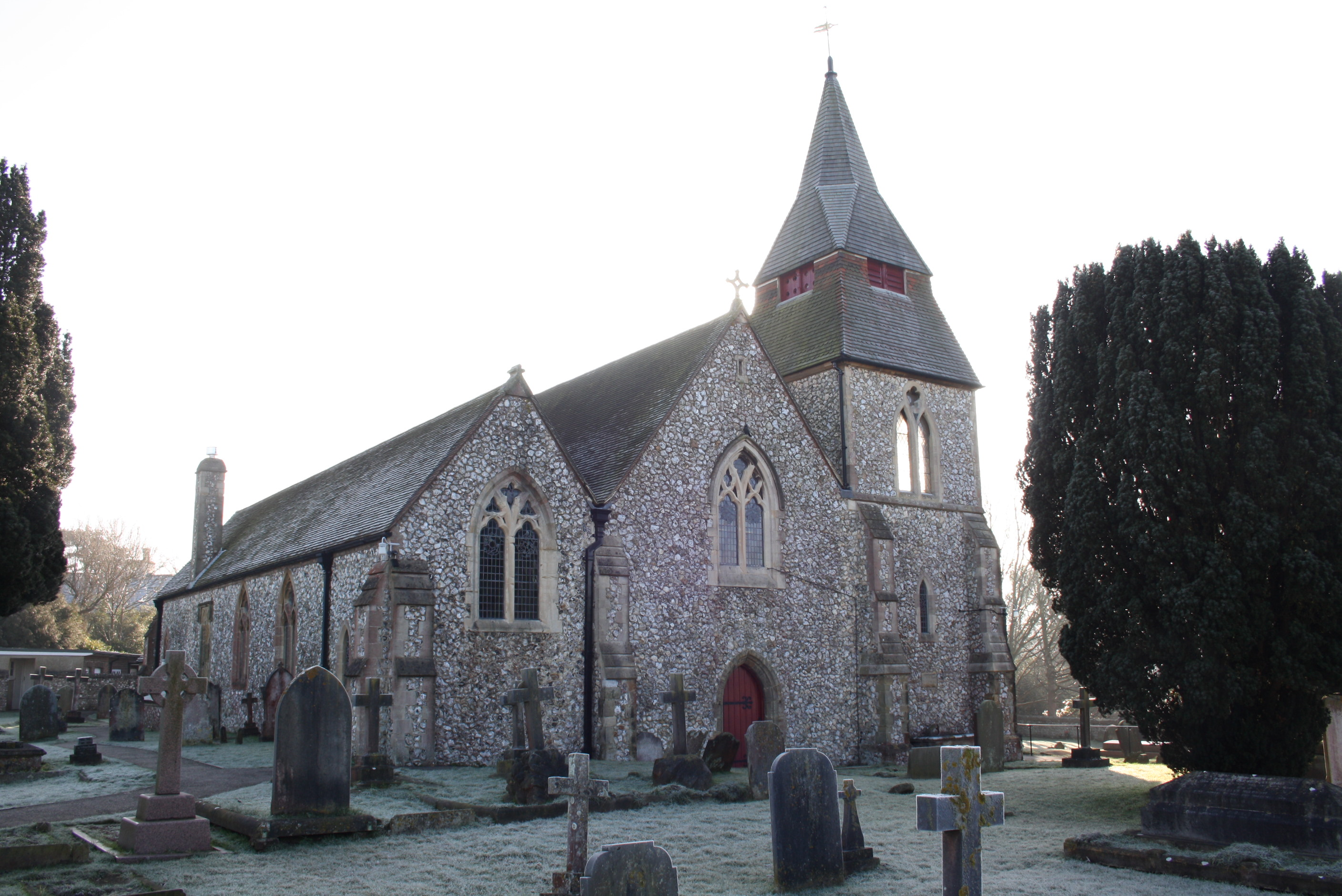
- St Cosmas and St Damian Church, February 2009.
- St Cosmas and St Damian Church
- 50°55′19″N 0°7′50″W
- OS grid reference: TQ 31489 15282
- Location: Keymer Road, Keymer, West Sussex BN6 8RB
- Country: England
- Denomination: Anglican
- Churchmanship: Liberal Catholic

History
- Status: Parish church

Architecture
- Functional status: Active
- Architect: Edmund Scott
- Style: Gothic Revival
- Completed: 1866

Administration
- Province: Province of Canterbury
- Diocese: Diocese of Chichester
- Archdeaconry: Chichester
- Deanery: Hurst
- Parish: Clayton with Keymer

St Cosmas and St Damian Church is an Anglican church in the village of Keymer, in the Mid Sussex district of West Sussex, England. Rebuilt in 1866 in a style similar to the Saxon building it replaced, it is the parish church of Keymer and now lies within a combined parish serving three villages in Mid Sussex. The church bears a very rare dedication to the twin Saints Cosmas and Damian, Christian martyrs of the 4th century. It is a grade II listed building.

== History ==
The medieval manor of Keymer was recorded in the Domesday Book in 1086 as being held by William de Watevile for William de Warenne, who built the nearby Lewes Castle. A church existed on the present site at that time; it was associated with Lewes Priory, which had been given it by a successor of de Watevile in 1093.

The present building incorporates some 12th-century structural elements: the chancel walls and apse date from that time. Until the rebuilding in 1866, there had been little change to the structure since the 14th century. The reconstruction was undertaken by Brighton-based architect Edmund Scott, who was responsible for several churches in his home town; he matched the church's largely 14th-century style rather than redesigning the building significantly. Six bells were added at various times: one in 1791, another in 1866 and a peal of four in 1911.

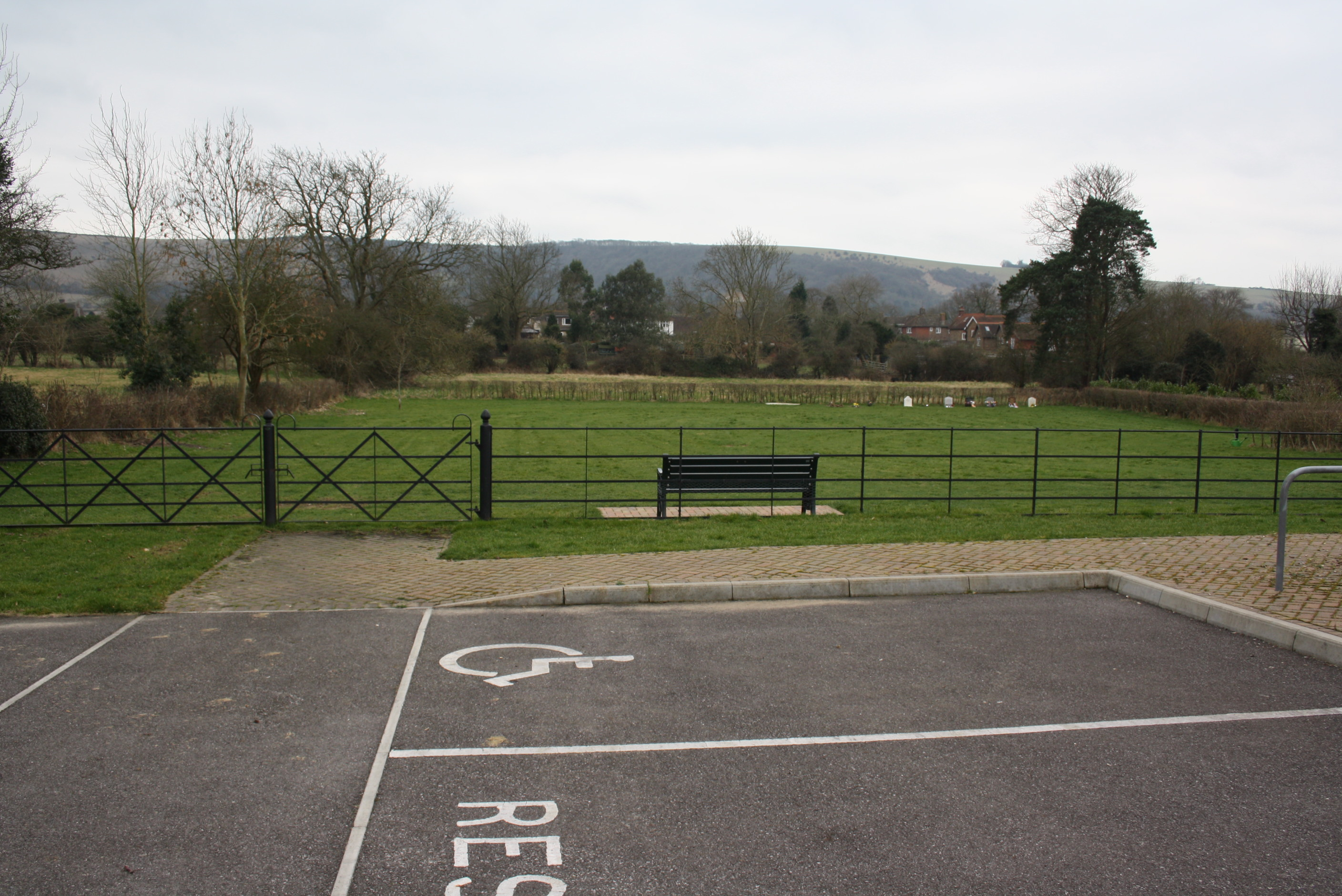
Hassocks Burial Ground

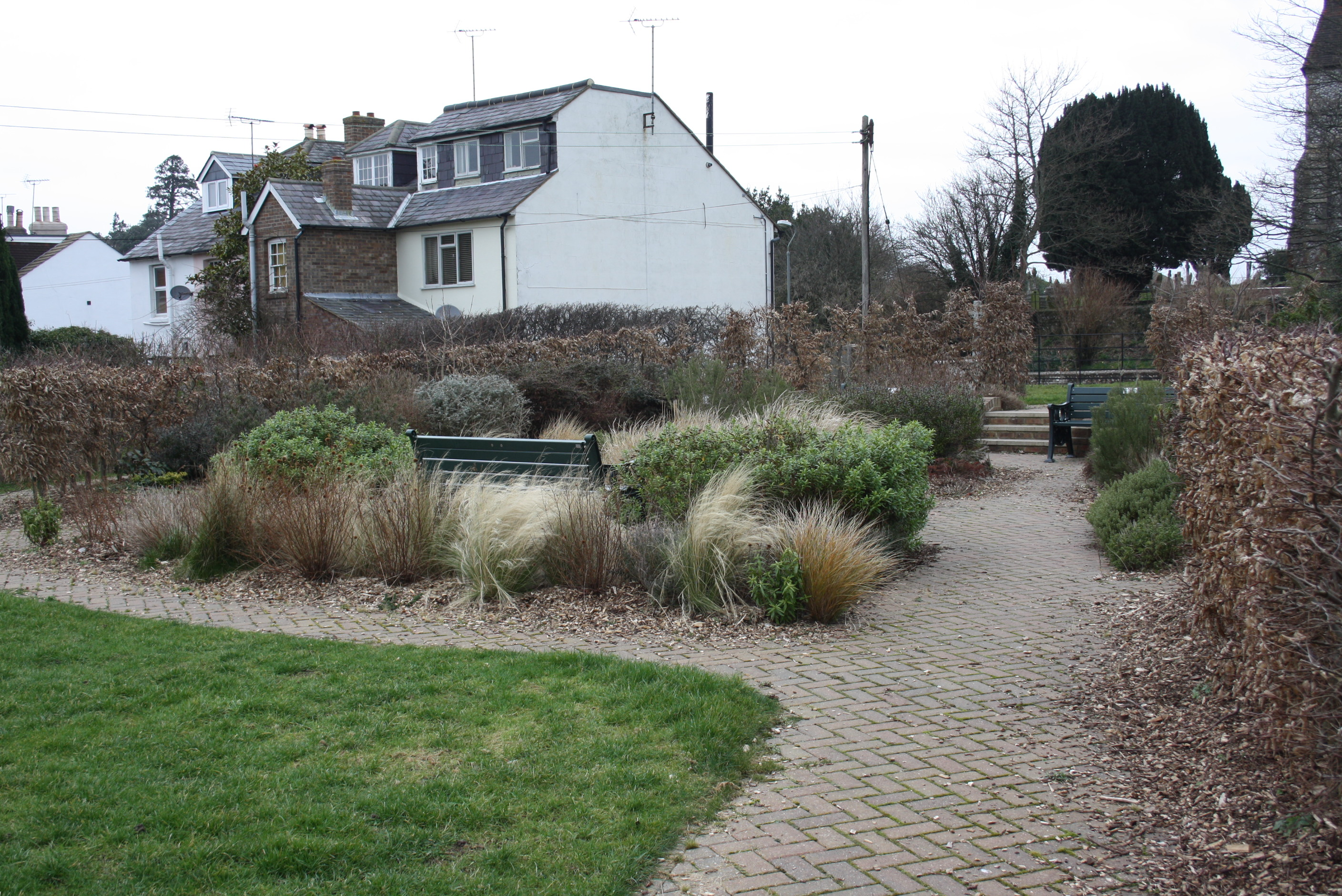
Garden of Remembrance

The church has a large graveyard with several war graves and a war memorial. The Commonwealth War Graves Commission identifies five soldiers—three from the First World War and two from the Second World War—who are buried there. There is no longer enough space for burials to take place in the original churchyard, so a new burial ground has been established in a field opposite the church. Mid Sussex District Council acquired the land on behalf of the Parish of Keymer and Clayton, and transferred ownership to Hassocks Parish Council. The latter now manages the area, which is called the Hassocks Burial Ground and Garden of Remembrance. The names on the War Memorial have been researched and details of the men's stories have been published. This adds depth to the bare names and gives details that would otherwise be forgotten.

The patron of the church, and holder of the advowson, is Brasenose College, Oxford.

== Dedication ==
The dedication of the church, to the twin Saints Cosmas and Damian, is extremely rare in the Church of England. Only three other extant churches in England bear their names: at Challock in Kent; Blean, two miles to the north of Canterbury, Kent; and Sherrington in Wiltshire. A redundant church with the same name exists near Leominster in Herefordshire. The saints are believed to have been twin brothers who worked as doctors in the Roman province of Syria. They were well-educated in science and medicine, and treated people without expecting any payment. They were known to have been put to death in 303 during the Diocletianic Persecution.

== Architecture ==
The church walls are built of flint in an irregular style reminiscent of crazy paving. There is a small tower and steeple topped with a small, two-stage spire at the southwest corner. The plan consists of a chancel with Norman-era apse, nave, aisles, and a porch at the south end. The south aisle was built in the 1866 reconstruction, but its counterpart on the north side was added in 1890. The ancient stone dressings in the east window were preserved during the rebuilding. The remains of what may be an original piscina, which lacks its basin, is in the apse.

== The church today ==
Although the churches at Clayton and Keymer have been connected since their founding, the parishes were not officially united until 25 July 1978 by means of an Order in Council. St Cosmas and Damian Church is now one of three churches in this parish, which includes the 11th-century, Grade I-listed St John the Baptist's Church—Clayton's parish church—and St Francis of Assisi's Church in Hassocks, built in 1975. The parish covers the three villages and the surrounding rural area; its eastern boundary follows the border between West Sussex and East Sussex. English Heritage granted the church Grade II listed status on 21 June 2007.

There are two Sunday services most weeks (the first Sunday of the month has no early-morning service). Other services take place on Wednesdays and alternate Saturdays. The church is always open during daylight hours.

The area around the church was designated a Conservation Area in January 1989. Mid Sussex District Council, which was responsible for granting this status, stated that "the church [being] sited on higher land which can be seen from all approaches" was one of the character-giving features of the area, which covers the old central area of Keymer village.

== Gallery ==
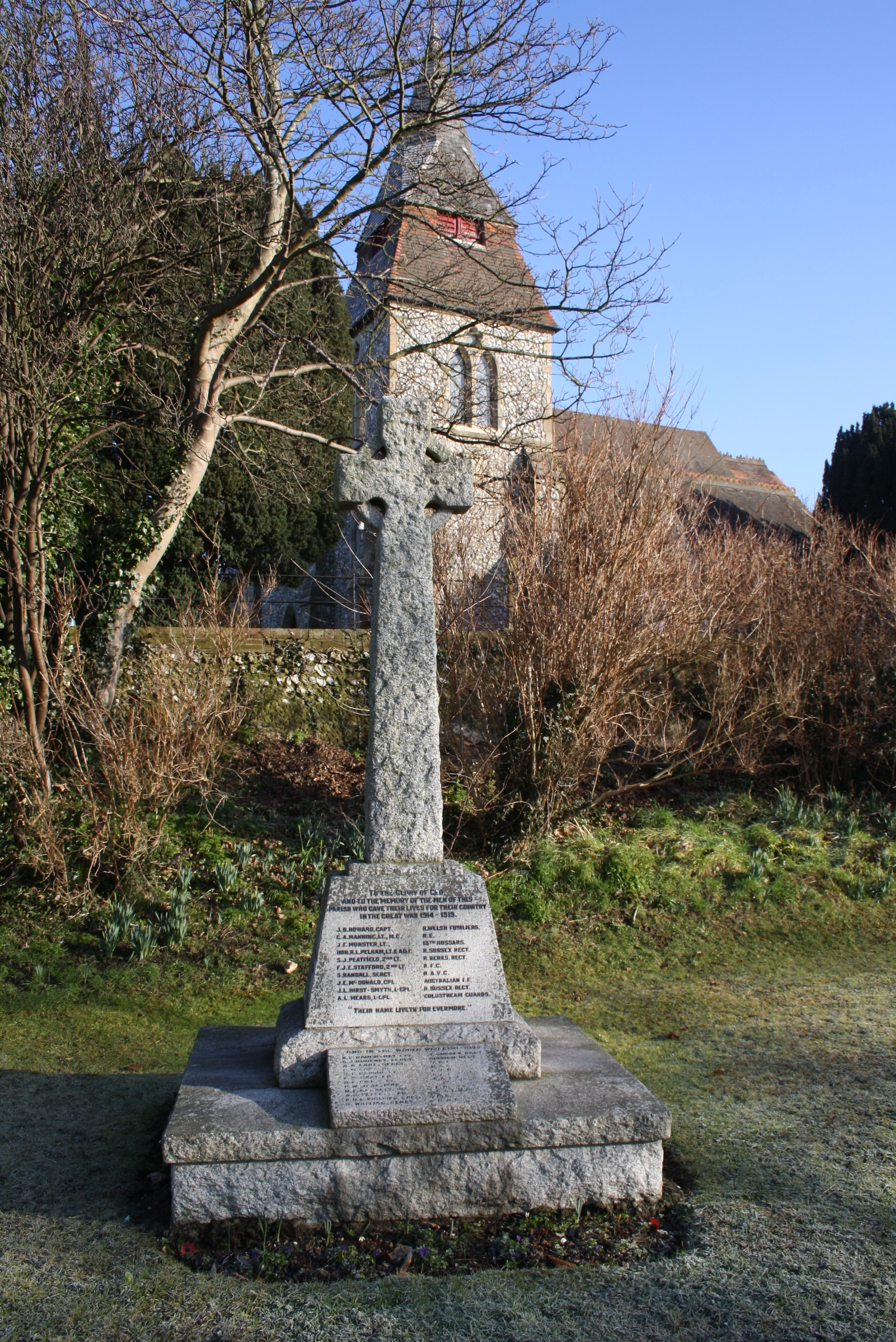
War Memorial to the south of the church.

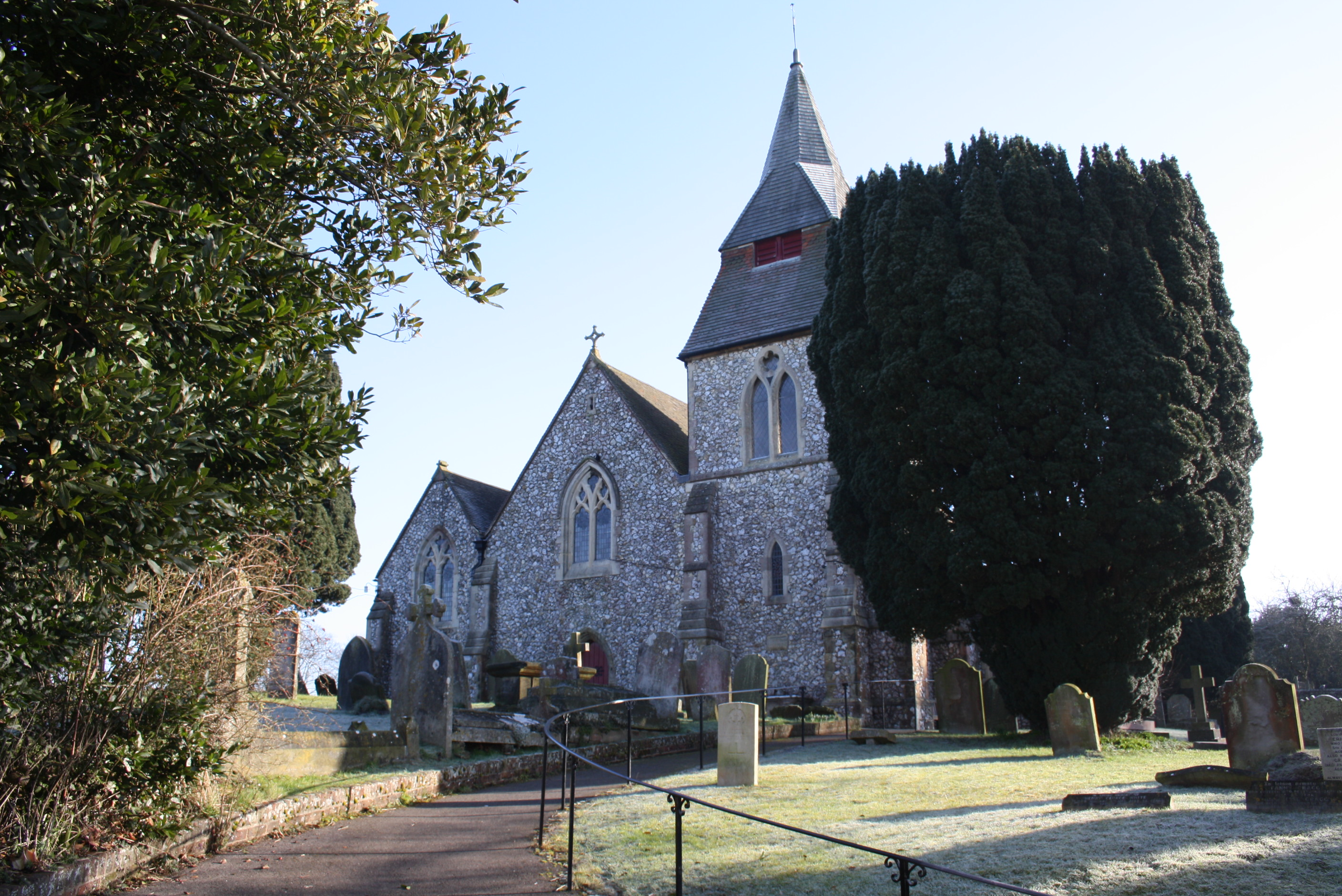
The church from the main entrance.

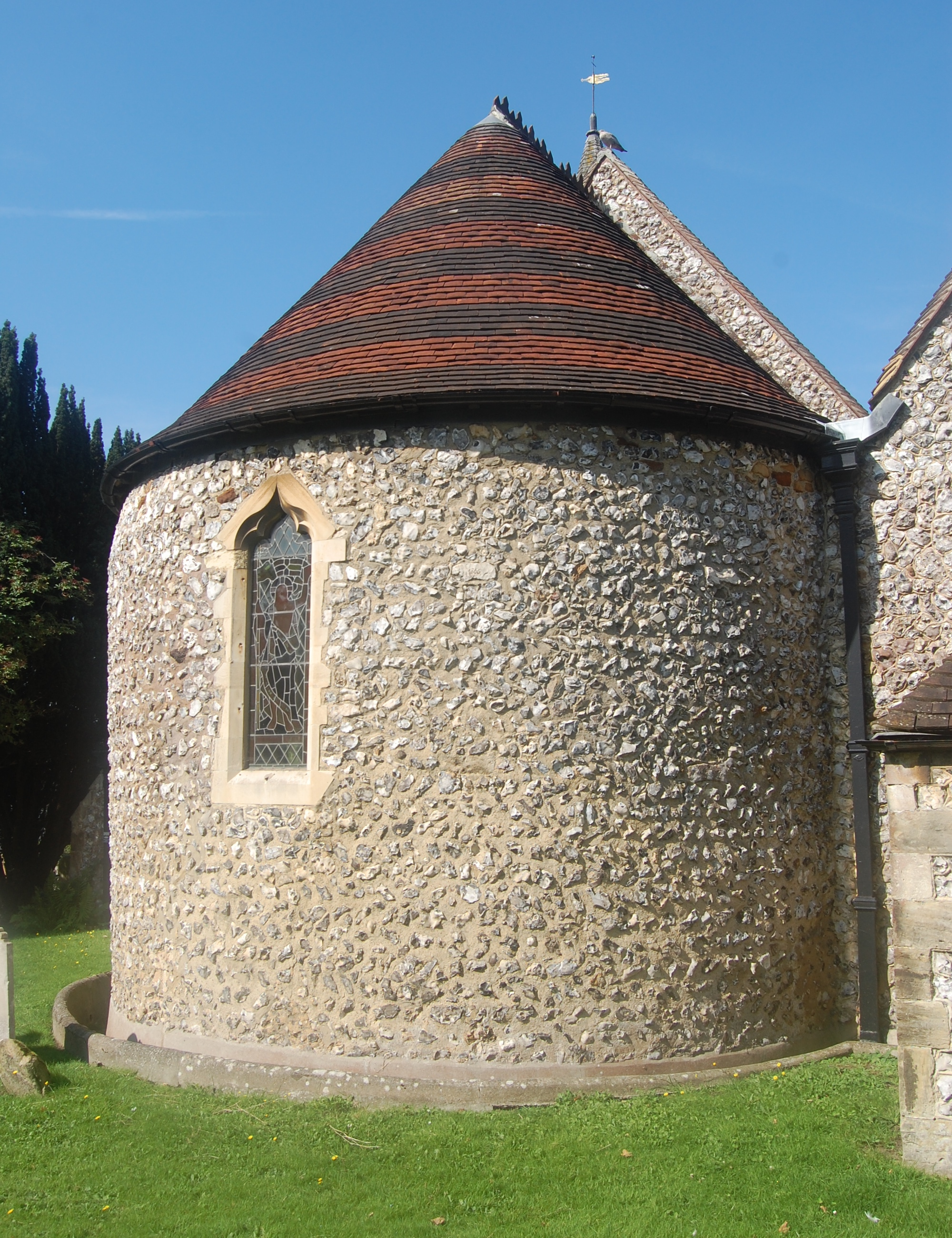
The apsidal chancel
