= Clayton Church =

Clayton church may refer to:

- Clayton Wesley Uniting Church in Adelaide, South Australia
- St John the Baptist's Church, Clayton in West Sussex, England
- St John the Baptist Church, Clayton, West Yorkshire
