= Philip Mainwaring Johnston =

British architect and architectural historian

Philip Mainwaring Johnston fsa friba (1865–1936), also known as PM Johnston, was a British architect and architectural historian.

== Education ==
Philip attended King's College School, London. He studied drawing and painting under Professor Delamotte at King’s College, London. Professor Delamotte was a photographer/illustrator who became Professor of Drawing and Fine Art at King’s College. Whilst studying at King's College, he undertook many sketching trips in England and on the Continent - an important part of every architect's education at that time.

== Career ==
Articled to John Belcher, Johnston was notable for his sensitive conservation and restoration work on many churches in the south-east of England and other historic buildings. He also designed 24 World War I memorials, was appointed as Chichester Cathedral's in-house diocesan architect and architect to the Stratford-on-Avon Preservation Trust.

He designed several new buildings, mainly in the Home Counties, including churches, houses, vicarages and model cottages.

He engaged in various undertakings, such as refurbishing Poling Priory in Sussex to serve as a home for his late brother, Sir Harry Johnston; renovating Prittle-well Priory in Essex on behalf of the Corporation of Southend-on-Sea; and conducting research at St. Helen's Priory in Bishopsgate for the Leathersellers Company.

At Oxford in 1927 he gave expert advice to the Victoria and Albert Museum on an ancient wall painting then discovered in a house at Carfax; and in 1933 he was called in to inspect the ceiling of Jesus College Chapel, which thereafter was replaced by the present oak ceiling.

In Surrey his professional work included the churches at Cater- ham, Chaldon, Charlwood, Compton, Coulsdon, Ewehurst, Stoke D'Abemon, Warlingham, and Witley. He was an advisory expert to the Surrey County Council.

Johnston was vice-president of the BAA and Surrey Archaeological Society, and was "a pillar of the Sussex Archaeological Society". He wrote several historical works, although much was not published in his lifetime.

== Family ==
Johnston was born on 20 January 1865. His parents were John Brookes Johnston and Esther Laetitia Hamilton. His father was Secretary in London of Sun Insurance Co. / Royal Exchange Assurance Co. and founded the London Salvage Corps.

Philip was the seventh of twelve children. His brother was Sir Henry Hamilton (Harry) Johnston, a British explorer, botanist, artist, colonial administrator, linguist. He also had a sister named Mabel Johnston and a brother called Alex Johnston, who wrote a book about Sir Johnston.

PM Johnston married at Yapton parish church, Sussex, on 3 September 1902, Florence Anna Wynne, third daughter of the Right Rev. Frederick Wynne, Bishop of Killaloe and Clonfert.

Their daughter was Thea Holme (1904–1980) who was an actress in the 1930s and later a writer.

He lived in Camberwell on de Crespigny Park (from 1907) and at Sussex Lodge, Champion Hill, Camberwell (now No. 42 ) from 1914. The latter was one of two pairs of semi-detached houses that he designed and built in the arts and crafts style. All four houses remain and are perhaps the best example of the arts and crafts style in the local area.

He was a member of the Catholic Apostolic Church. He is buried at West Norwood Cemetery.

== Notable works ==
Church restorations

- St Andrew's Church, Ford (1899–1900)
- St Botolph's Church, Hardham (c. 1900)
- St Mary's Church, Yapton (1902)
- St Mary Magdalene's Church, Lyminster (1902 and 1933)
- St George's Church, Trotton (1903–04)
- St Mary Magdalene's Church, Tortington (1904)
- St Peter's Church, Preston Village, Brighton (1906)
- St Peter's Church, Linchmere (1906 and 1936)
- St Mary the Virgin's Church, North Stoke (1910)
- St Peter's Church, Terwick (1910)
- St Mary's Church, Chithurst (1911)
- St Nicholas' Church, Poling (1917)
- All Saints Church, Lindfield (1931)
- St John the Baptist's Church, Westbourne (1932–33)
- St Mary's Church, Stoughton (1935)
- St Bartholomew's Church, Rogate

Fittings

- St John the Baptist's Church, Clayton (lychgate)
- St Peter and St Paul's Church, Hellingly
- St Peter's Church, Selsey (reredos)
- St Mary's Church, Walberton (lychgate)

Publications

A Schedule of Antiquities in the County of Surrey, 1913, Surrey Archeological Society

Send Church and the Chapel of Ripley, 1901, Roworth & Co.

Shorthampton Chapel and its wall-paintings, 1905, Harrison

An Early Window and Wall Paintings in Witley Church,1918, Roworth & Co.

Church Chests of the twelfth and thirteenth centuries in England, 1908, Harrison & Sons

Old Camberwell: its history and antiquities, 1919, J.R.Wigzell

White Swan Hotel, Stratford on-Avon, etc., 1928, Trust Houses

Church of S. Mary, Stoke D'Abernon, 1930, Spottiswoode, Ballantyne & Co.

Photographs by Johnstone are held at the Conway Library of art and architecture in the Courtauld, London.

== Sources ==
- Obituary, The Times 19 December 1936
