= Edward Michelborne =

Member of the Parliament of England

Sir Edward Michelborne (c. 1562 − 1609), sometimes written Michelbourn, was an English soldier, adventurer and explorer. After a military career in the 1590s he tried to be appointed 'principal commander' for the first voyage of the East India Company (EIC), but was rebuffed. He subsequently became an interloper with the personal approval of King James I and set out to the Far East in December 1604. Indulging in piracy as well as seeking out trade, his activities upset the EIC who complained to the Privy Council about his interloping, following his return to England in 1606.

== Early life ==
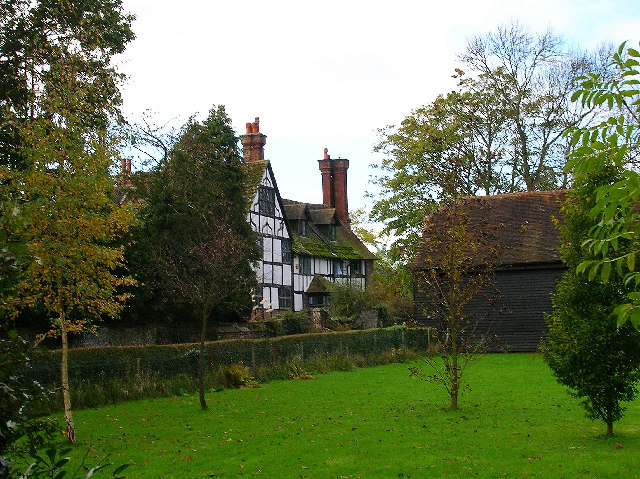
Early home of Michelbourne, Hammonds Place Farmhouse, Burgess Hill.

Edward was the eldest son of Edward Michelborne (d. 1587), a landowner, of Clayton, West Sussex and his first wife Jane Parsons of Steyning, Sussex. In 1565 the family moved into the newly built Hammonds Place Farmhouse, in neighbouring Burgess Hill.

He was captain in the Low Countries in 1591, and was continued in the queen's pay till September 1598, in which year he commanded a company of foot in Ostend, but he is not named on any service, except as commanding the ship Moon on the Islands Voyage, under Robert Devereux, Earl of Essex, in 1597. In 1593 he represented Bramber in parliament, and is usually described as being from Hamondes, Sussex. In 1599 he served with Essex in Ireland, and was knighted by him at Dublin on 5 August.

== Conflict with the East India Company ==
On 16 October 1599, Lord Buckhurst, the Lord High Treasurer, recommended him to the newly formed East India Company (EIC) as 'principal commander' for their first voyage. The promoters declined, not wishing to employ any gentleman in a place of charge or command in the voyage. A year later Lord Buckhurst wrote again to the same effect, 'using much persuasion to the company,' who resolved as before, praying the lord treasurer 'to give them leave to sort their business with men of their own quality'. Michelborne was, however, permitted to subscribe, and in the list of those to whom the charter was granted his name stands fourth. Meanwhile, James Lancaster was appointed general or commander of the first voyage.

In February 1601 he was implicated in the Earl of Essex's rebellion, and possibly took part in the detention of the Lord Keeper, Thomas Egerton, and Lord Chief Justice on the 8th. On this charge he was examined before the commissioners but escaped with a fine of £200 after claiming that he had gone to the Earl's house to hear a sermon, but returned home on hearing of Queen Elizabeth's order to arrest Essex.

Nevertheless, the East India Company thought it a favourable opportunity to get rid of him, particularly as he had failed to pay the subscription owing for the first voyage. As a result, on 6 July 1601 the EIC resolved that he was 'disfranchised out of the freedom and privileges of the fellowship, and utterly disabled from taking any benefit or profit thereby'.

Meanwhile, by 1603, King James I, anxious to capture the spice trade, was concerned that since the original granting of the EIC charter only two voyages had been made out of what should have been six. As a result, in 1604 the King gave Michelborne a license 'to discover the countries of Cathay, China, Japan, Corea, and Cambay, and the islands and countries thereto adjoining, and to trade with the people there, notwithstanding any grant or charter to the contrary'. Michelborne therefore became the first 'interloper', unlawfully trading in breach of the EIC's monopoly. On 5 December 1604 Michelborne sailed in command of the Tiger, having with him as pilot John Davis and a second ship the Tiger's Whelp. Though nominally undertaken for discovery and trade, plunder seems to have been the object of the voyage. Michelborne set about robbing the native traders of the Indian Archipelago causing the EIC serious problems.

At Bantam, between 28 October and 2 November 1605, he put a summary check on the ambitions of the Dutch, but the service which he thus rendered the English merchants was more than counterbalanced by his plundering a richly laden China ship on her way to Java. Dutch reprisals for his attacks on them would end in the 1623 Amboyna massacre. Michelborne then made a serious error in allowing Japanese pirates aboard the Tiger. They attacked the crew, killed Davis and were only repelled by cannons being fired through a cabin wall, which tore them to pieces. Only one man survived, whom Michelborne ordered hung from the yardarm, but the rope snapped and he fell into the sea.

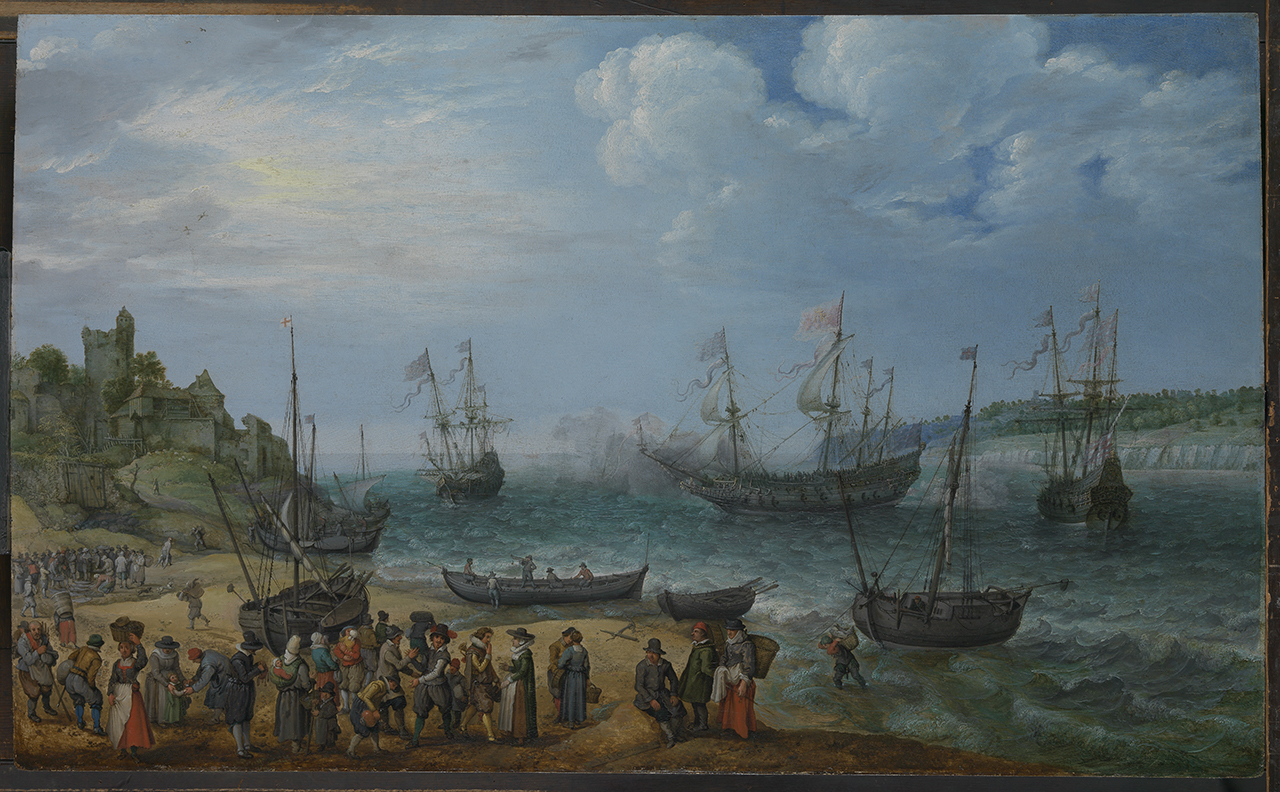
This painting is thought to show the return home of Sir Edward Michaelbourne, 9 July 1606, with the 64-gun ship Prince Royal, and an East Indiaman, by Adam Willaerts

The sad death of Davis, the representations of the merchants, and the improbability of further gain, led to his return to England, where he arrived on 9 July 1606. The incensed EIC complained to the Privy Council and now realised the need to consolidate and strengthen its position in the Spice Islands. William Keeling was then despatched on what would be the company's third voyage.

Three years after Michelborne's departure from Bantam the agent of the company still wrote of the bad effects of his voyage; the position of the English there would be very dangerous, he said, if 'any more such as he be permitted to do as he did'.

== Later life ==
After his return Michelborne settled in Hackney near London, where he owned a house and land. He died in 1609 and was buried on 4 May at the Church of St John-at-Hackney. In his will, dated 22 March 1609 he left a total of £55 to the poor of the Sussex parishes of Clayton, Penshurst and Lickfold, Lodsworth. A debt of £400 owed to him by Lord Buckhurst is also mentioned. He was survived by his son, Edward (1587-16??), who had matriculated at Christ Church, Oxford, in 1604, then became a student at the Middle Temple in 1606.
