= St Botolph's Church, Hardham =

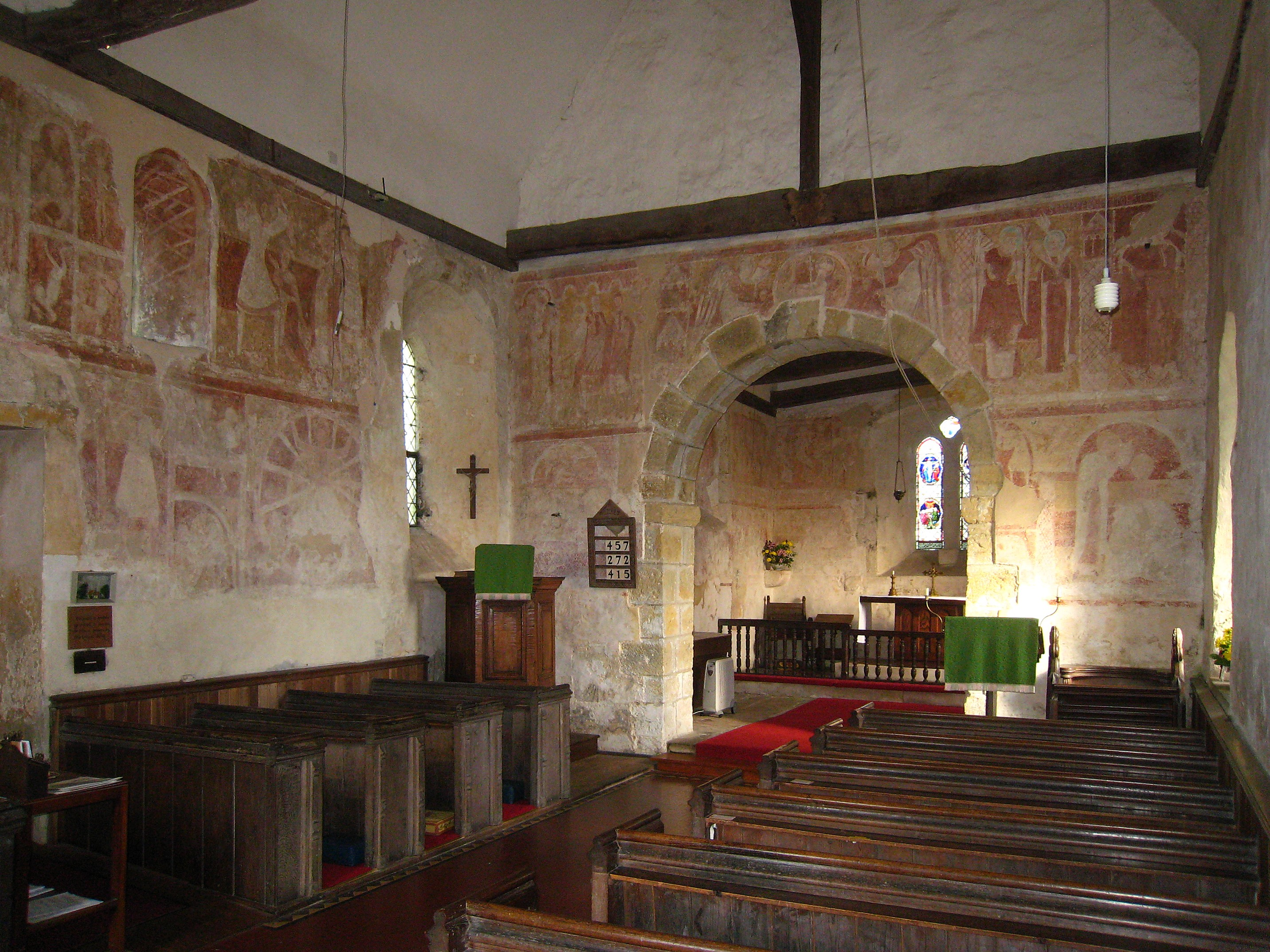
- The Romanesque paintings
- St Botolph's Church, Hardham
- 50.948551°N 0.522789°W
- Location: Church Lane, Hardham, West Sussex RH20 1LB
- Country: England
- Denomination: Church of England
- Website: Arun Churches

History
- Status: Parish church
- Founded: 11th century
- Dedication: St Botolph

Architecture
- Functional status: Active
- Heritage designation: Grade I
- Designated: 15 March 1955
- Style: Anglo-Saxon; Norman

Administration
- Province: Canterbury
- Diocese: Chichester
- Archdeaconry: Horsham
- Deanery: Rural Deanery of Petworth
- Parish: Hardham

Clergy
- Vicar: Fr. David Twinley

St Botolph's Church is the Church of England parish church of Hardham, West Sussex. It is in Horsham District and is a Grade I listed building. It contains the earliest nearly complete series of wall paintings in England. Among forty individual subjects is the earliest known representation of St George in England. Dating from the 12th century, they were hidden from view until uncovered in 1866 and now "provide a rare and memorable impression of a medieval painted interior". The simple two-cell stone building, with its original medieval whitewashed exterior, has seen little alteration and also has an ancient bell.

== History ==
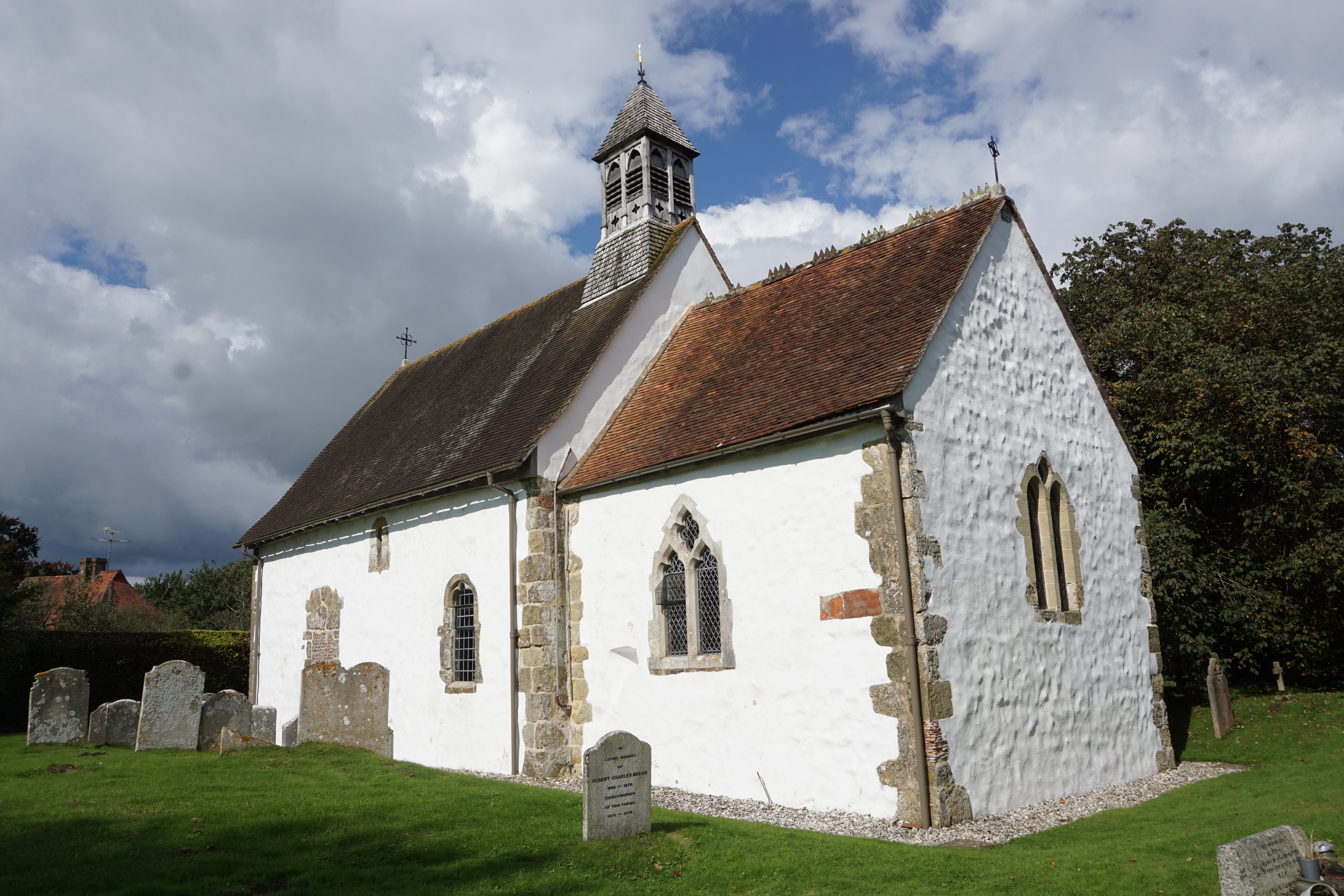
The church's exterior

Hardham village is just off the main A29 road, which is "excitingly" separated from the village lane by narrow hedges. The A29 follows the course of Stane Street, an important Roman road, and Hardham was the first posting station after leaving the Roman city of Noviomagus Reginorum (present-day Chichester). Hardham was recorded in the Domesday Book of 1086 as Heriedham, but a church was not described. Hardham Priory was founded nearby in 1248.

The church is late Saxon or early Norman. Despite its omission from the Domesday survey, the present building is often considered to be 11th-century; all sources agree that it was complete by 1125 at the latest. The design, described as "primitive" and simple, appears to belong solely to the very early Norman style rather than "wavering between Saxon and Norman" like some contemporary churches; but the dedication to St Botolph is generally associated with Saxon churches. Some stones and tiles used by the Romans for their nearby buildings were incorporated into the fabric of the building, especially in the chancel.

An anchorite — apparently a woman called Myliana — was housed in a stone cell attached to the church from about 1250. A squint was added at the same time to give her a view into the chancel towards the altar and to allow her to receive Communion. Another known occupant of the cell was Prior Robert, who died there in 1285. The squint was later blocked, but in about 1900 it was uncovered. Some lancet windows were added in the nave in the late 13th century, and in the 14th century the chancel received two new window openings.

Many churches in small villages around the South Downs were changed very little after they were built, and St Botolph's Church is an example of this. Minimal population growth over the centuries meant that enlargement was not needed; and the parishes tended to be poor, with little to spend on rebuilding or new architectural designs. Therefore, the church retained its simple appearance until the 19th century, when a porch and bell-turret were added. At the same time, the frescoes were revealed again: first in 1862, when a section of whitewash was removed and one painting was found (although the work damaged it), and later in 1866, when the rest were uncovered. They are faded but clearly discernible. Philip Mainwaring Johnston undertook some restoration of the frescoes around 1900 and wrote a study of them in the Sussex Archaeological Collections in 1901.

== Architecture ==
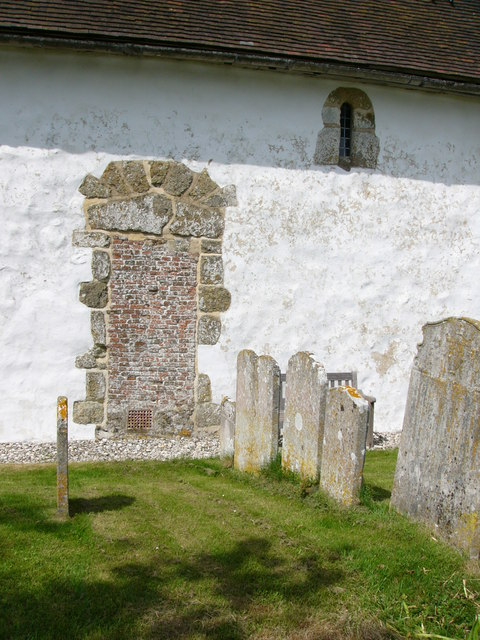
The south wall has an ancient blocked doorway.

The church consists of nave and chancel only. Such two-cell structures are common in the South Downs area of Sussex. The nave measures 31 1/2 by 19 feet (9.6 m × 5.8 m), and the chancel is much shorter and slightly narrower at 17 by 15 1/2 feet (5.2 m × 4.7 m). The walls, 2 3/4 feet (0.84 m) thick, are of coarse sandstone rubble masonry and flint with much re-use of Roman stonework and tiles. In particular, one of the blocks in the southeast quoin is in fact a set of about 16 tiles with their original Roman mortar. The other quoins are rough-faced stone blocks with dimensions of about 20×15×7 inches (51×38×18 cm). A shingle-covered belfry stands on the east gable of the nave, and a porch protrudes from the north side. The exterior walls are covered in white plaster—a common feature of churches in the medieval era.

The nave and chancel are separated by a chancel arch whose "austere" and "broad simplicity" is indicative of early Norman design. The surface has "discreet", subtly ring-moulded imposts which hardly interrupt the smooth lines. Certain other features suggest Saxon influence, including the square east end of the chancel and the substantial, blocky quoins. The south wall also has a bricked-up doorway, which may have been a Saxon-era entrance. Overall, though, the building is low, broad and sturdy—a "vigorous, down-to-earth and practical work" which was characteristic of Norman builders. The king-post roof is likely to be original.

High in the nave walls are two small windows with modest splays. There are also original Early English-style lancet windows, which "suit the church very well", and other windows which were added later. The porch and bell-turret were added in the Victorian period. A squint was cut into the south side of the chancel in the Middle Ages. It was the site of a now vanished anchorite's cell, which would have projected from the wall.

Internal fixtures include a 15th-century Perpendicular Gothic octagonal font, benches whose simple straight-headed ends date from the same era, and altar rails dating from 1720. One of the two bells, possibly dating from the early 12th century, may be one of the oldest in Sussex but not the oldest, St Nicholas Church Worth is the oldest; the other was cast in 1636 and bears the inscription Gloria Deo in Excelsis T.P., 1636, B.E..

== The wall paintings ==
=== Introduction ===
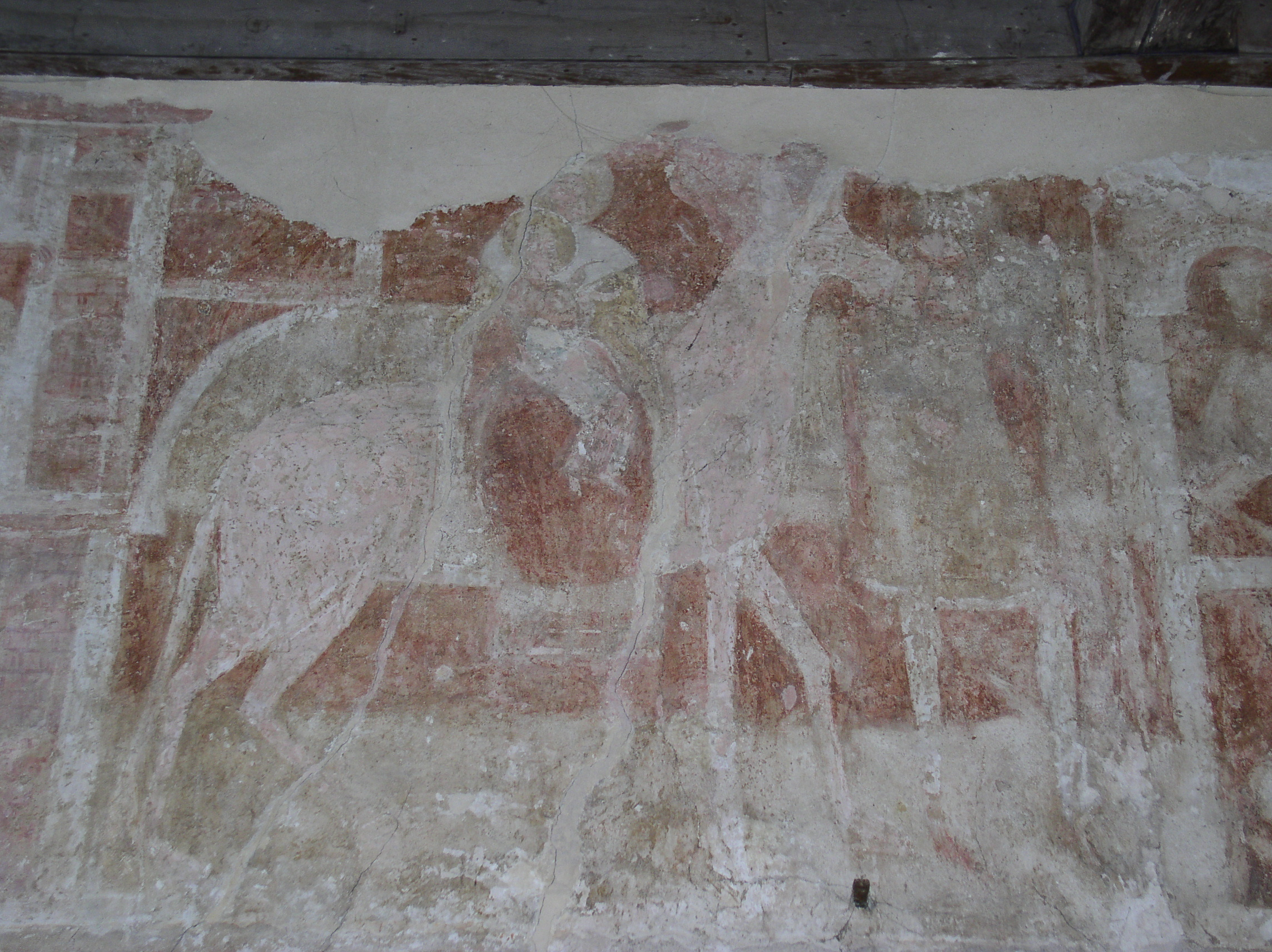
The Flight to Egypt

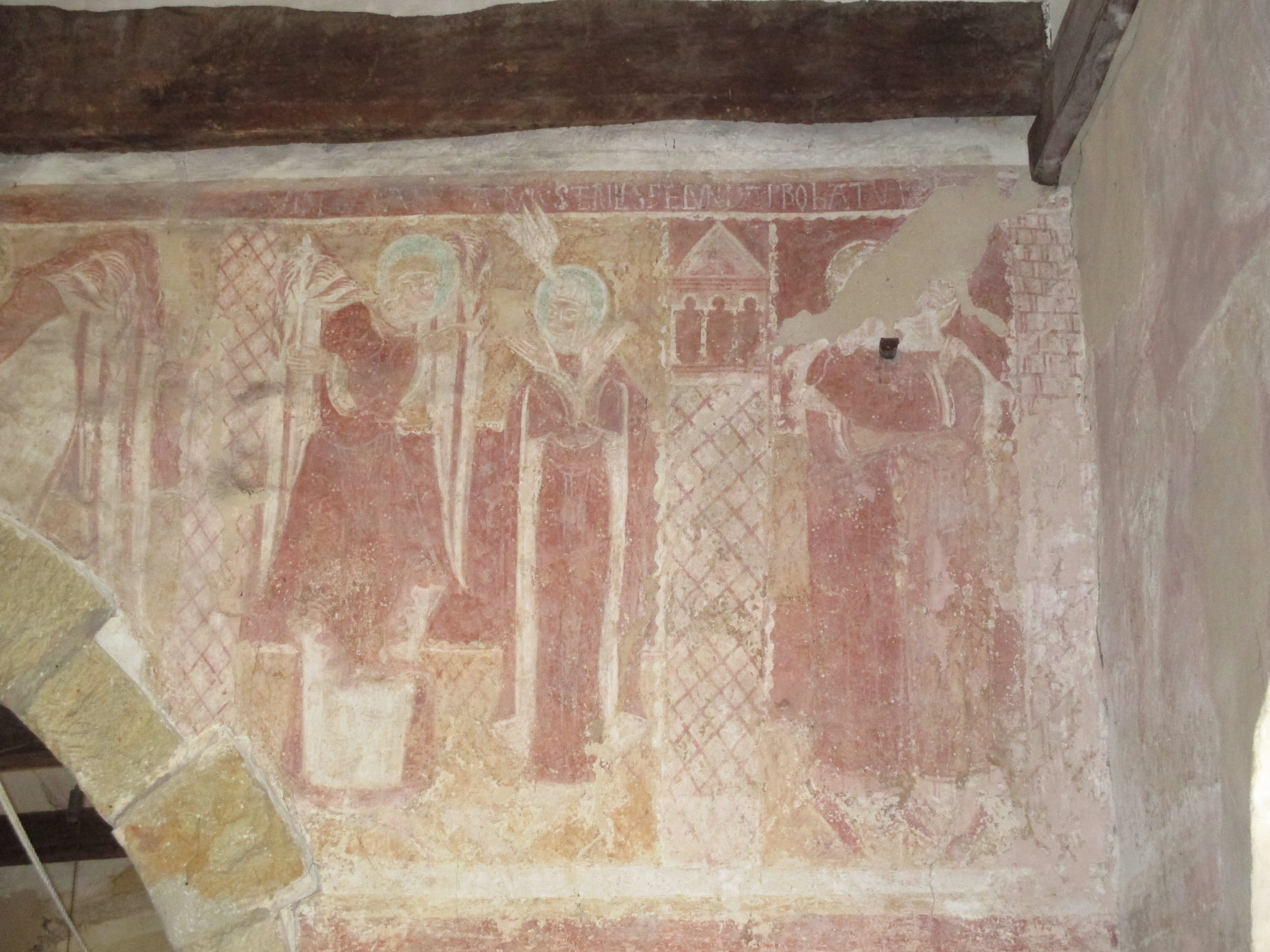
Annuciation with inscription above.

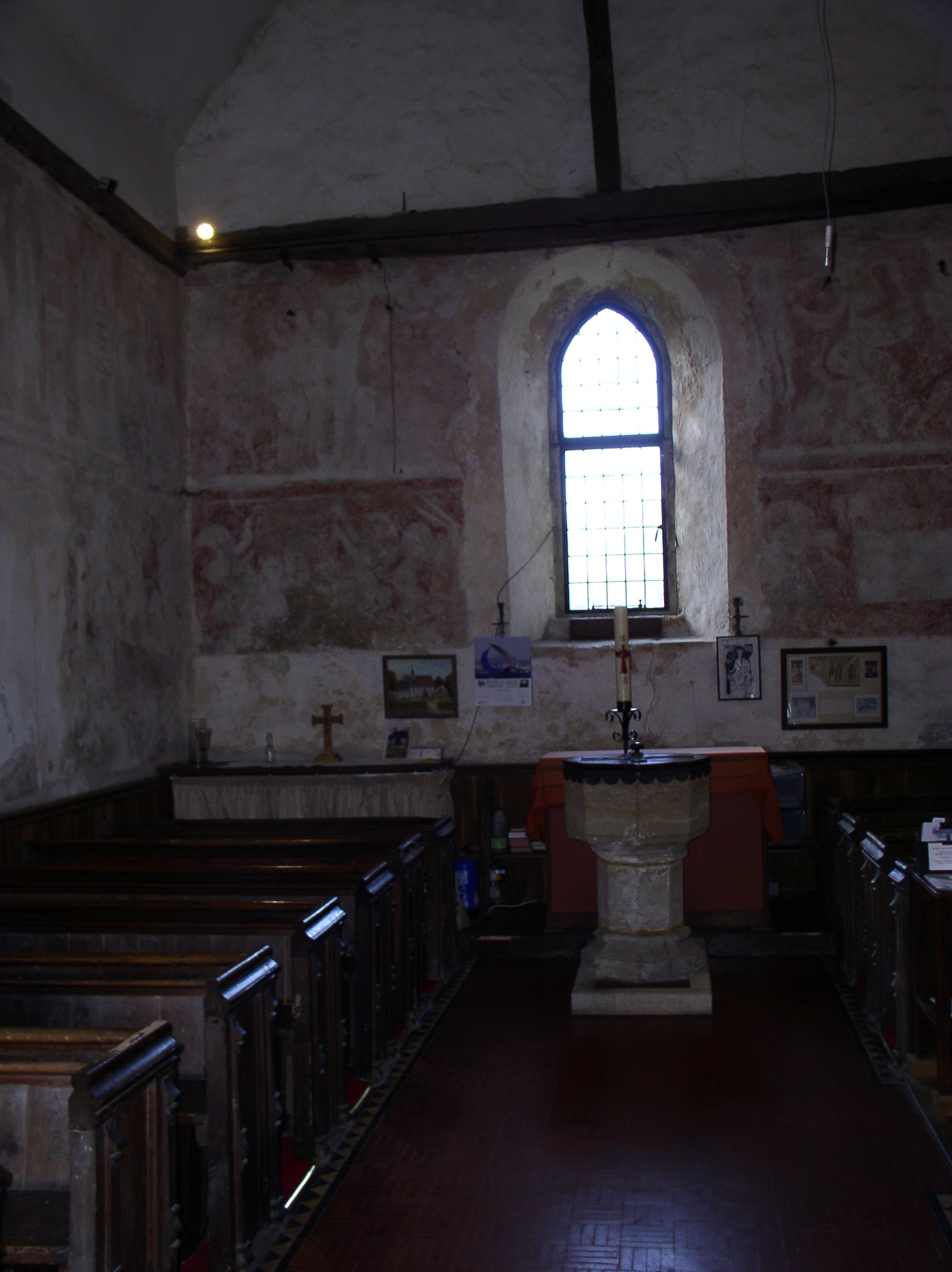
West end of the nave - hell scenes

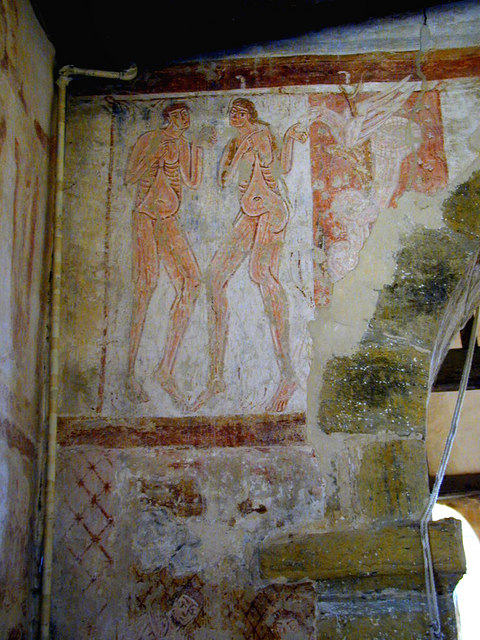
Adam and Eve - the temptation.

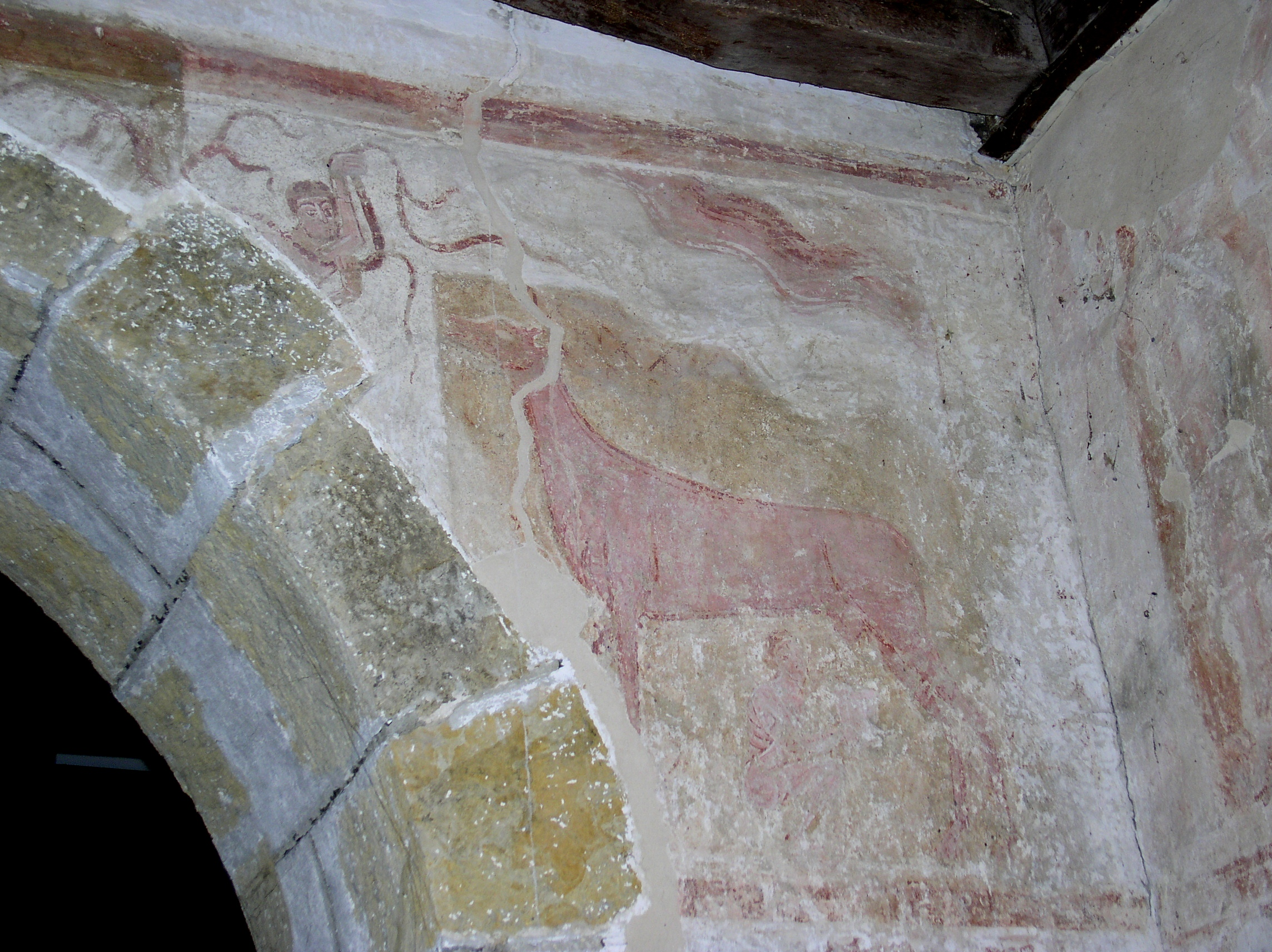
Labours of Adam and Eve - Eve milking a cow.

In the early 12th century, St Pancras' Priory at Lewes, one of the richest monasteries in England, apparently supervised the decoration of the church interior with an extensive set of frescoes. Murals from the same school—known as the Lewes Group — can also be seen at Coombes Church near Shoreham-by-Sea, St John the Baptist's Church, Clayton and St Michael and All Angels Church at Plumpton, and were once visible at the church in Westmeston as well. Unusually, the frescoes cover the whole church interior. They are celebrated for their age, extent and quality: Ian Nairn calls them "the fame of Hardham", and descriptions such as "fine", "[Hardham's] particular glory" and "one of the most important sets in the country" have been applied. The frescoes at Hardham were not on display to worshippers for very long: they were covered with whitewash in the 13th century.

=== Date and style ===
In addition to the link with the supposed "Lewes Group" of artists, the wall paintings can be dated on historical and stylistic grounds to the early 12th century. They represent the "Anglo-Norman" style of this period, as seen in Norman manuscripts and the Bayeux Tapestry. Dating of the paintings is further indicated by Scene 20 (see below).

=== Technique and conservation ===
The wall paintings were created in three stages. First, a thick base layer of plaster was applied to the walls; then a thinner layer of plaster was applied over this in patches, according to the layout of the scenes and borders; then each patch was then painted while the plaster was still wet. (This is the true fresco technique). The "bacon and egg" palette of colours was obtained from cheap locally available materials: red and yellow ochre, lime white, carbon black, and green from copper carbonate.

Since their discovery in 1866 the wall paintings have been variously restored and conserved in 1900–01, 1936, 1950, 1961–63 and 1986. They have suffered from moisture and salts. Much work has been done to improve the drainage and the exterior rendering of the church.

=== Description ===
There are four main themes to the wall paintings: Adam and Eve, the Life of Christ, Judgement and Apocalypse (including Hell scenes), and the Labours of the Months. The paintings are in two tiers along each wall. There were originally explanatory inscriptions in the borders above the scenes, but only a fragment of these survives on the east wall of the nave. The description below follows the numbering scheme in the booklet by the Courtauld Institute cited below, which is available for visitors to the church.

==== Scene 1: Agnus Dei or Lamb of God ====
Above the chancel arch the Lamb of God is shown, surrounded by an aureole, with an angel either side.

==== Scenes 2 to 14: Infancy of Christ ====
Running along the upper part of the east, south and north nave walls are depictions of episodes from the infancy of Christ. These comprise the nativity, annunciation to the shepherds, an unidentified subject, the journey of the Magi, Herod ordering the massacre of the innocents, the adoration of the Magi, the dream of Joseph, the dream of the Magi, the flight into Egypt, the massacre of the innocents itself and Christ as a child in the Temple.

The scenes of the Annunciation and Salutation or Visitation (Mary visiting her cousin Elizabeth) have above them the only remaining explanatory inscription. This reads in Latin: "Virgo Saluatatur. Sterilis fecunda probatur". In English this is: "The Virgin is saluted. The barren is proved fruitful".

==== Scene 15: Baptism of Christ ====
On the east nave wall is a poorly preserved depiction of the Baptism of Christ.

==== Scenes 16 to 19: Dives and Lazarus ====
These scenes recount the story of the rich man and the poor man, known as Dives and Lazarus, and their contrasting fates before and after death, told in Luke 16:19–31. Scenes include a fragment of the feast of Dives, the soul of Lazarus taken to heaven, the soul of Lazarus on Abraham's bosom and the death of Dives.

==== Scenes 20 to 24: St George ====
Scene 20 provides confirmation of the dating of the paintings to the early 12th century. It shows "St George in battle against the infidel", and was therefore almost certainly composed after the First Crusade of 1095 to 1099. The other scenes are St George held by torturers, the torture of St George, St George on the wheel and the burial of St George. These represent the earliest known depictions of the saint in a British church.

==== Scene 26: Hell scenes ====
A group of four Hell scenes (the Torments of the Damned) cover the entire west wall of the nave.

==== Scenes 27 to 30: Adam and Eve ====
In the chancel the scenes of Adam and Eve cover the west wall above the chancel arch. They include an unusual trompe-l'œil representation of the Temptation, made to look like a textile wall hanging. Other scenes show the pair hiding their nakedness, sitting back to back, and lamenting after the fall. Eve is depicted being tempted by the forbidden fruit by a wyvern-like serpent, and milking a cow. This last scene is a unique depiction of Eve. The figures are "violent and elongated [...] as distorted as a Russian ikon, and Ian Nairn noted the "diagrammatic sketching in of belly and buttocks[, which] is brilliant".

==== Scenes 31 to 36: Passion and Resurrection ====
Christ's Passion and Resurrection are depicted on the chancel walls. Scenes include the Last Supper, Christ's betrayal by Judas, the Flagellation of Christ, his entombment, the three Marys at the tomb, and the washing of the disciples' feet.

==== Scenes 37 to 39: Apostles, Elders of the Apocalypse, Christ in Majesty ====
Representations of the Elders of the Apocalypse and Apostles cover the upper parts of the north and south walls of the chancel. Christ in Majesty originally would have appeared on the east wall, but the figure has been destroyed by the later insertion of a window. Only the flanking seraphs remain.

== The church today ==
St Botolph's Church was listed at Grade I on 15 March 1955. Such buildings are defined as being of "exceptional interest", and in some cases of greater than national importance. As of February 2001, it was one of 38 Grade I listed buildings, and 1,726 listed buildings of all grades, in the district of Horsham.

The parish covers the hamlet of Hardham and the surrounding rural area. The River Arun, the southern edge of Pulborough and field boundaries mark its outer limits. The A29 road runs through from southwest to northeast. The parish is one of four in the joint benefice of Bury with Houghton, Coldwaltham and Hardham.

Services are held each Sunday, generally using the Book of Common Prayer.

== See also ==
- Grade I listed buildings in West Sussex
- List of places of worship in Horsham (district)
- St John the Baptist's Church, Clayton

== Bibliography ==
- Anonymous (November 2007). "Hardham: Its History and its Church" (PDF). Hardham: Hardham Church. p. 3. Archived from the original (PDF) on 8 October 2011.
- Beevers, David; Marks, Richard; Roles, John (1989). Sussex Churches and Chapels. Brighton: The Royal Pavilion, Art Gallery and Museums. ISBN 0-948723-11-4.
- Coppin, Paul (2006). 101 Medieval Churches of West Sussex. Seaford: S.B. Publications. ISBN 1-85770-306-5.
- Courtauld Institute of Art (1994). St Botolph's Church, Hardham, West Sussex: The Wall Paintings. Hardham: Hardham Church.
- Fisher, E.A. (1970). The Saxon Churches of Sussex. Newton Abbot: David & Charles. ISBN 0-7153-4946-5.
- Johnston, P.M. (1901). "Hardham Church and its Early Paintings". Sussex Archaeological Collections. 44. Lewes: Sussex Archaeological Society: 73–115. doi:10.5284/1085904.
- Nairn, Ian; Pevsner, Nikolaus (1965). Sussex. The Buildings of England. Harmondsworth: Penguin Books. ISBN 0-14-071028-0.
- Pé, Diana (2008). West Sussex Church Walks. PP (Pé Publishing). ISBN 978-0-9543690-0-2.
- Roberts, Richard (1988). Twelfth Century Church Architecture in Sussex. Lewes: The Book Guild Ltd. ISBN 0-86332-277-8.
- Salter, Mike (2000). The Old Parish Churches of Sussex. Malvern: Folly Publications. ISBN 1-871731-40-2.
- Vigar, John (1986). Exploring Sussex Churches. Rainham: Meresborough Books. ISBN 0-948193-09-3.
- Wales, Tony (1999). The West Sussex Village Book. Newbury: Countryside Books. ISBN 1-85306-581-1.
- Whiteman, Ken; Whiteman, Joyce (1998). Ancient Churches of Sussex. Seaford: S.B. Publications. ISBN 1-85770-154-2.
