= St John the Baptist's Church, Clayton =

Church in West Sussex, England

St John the Baptist's Church
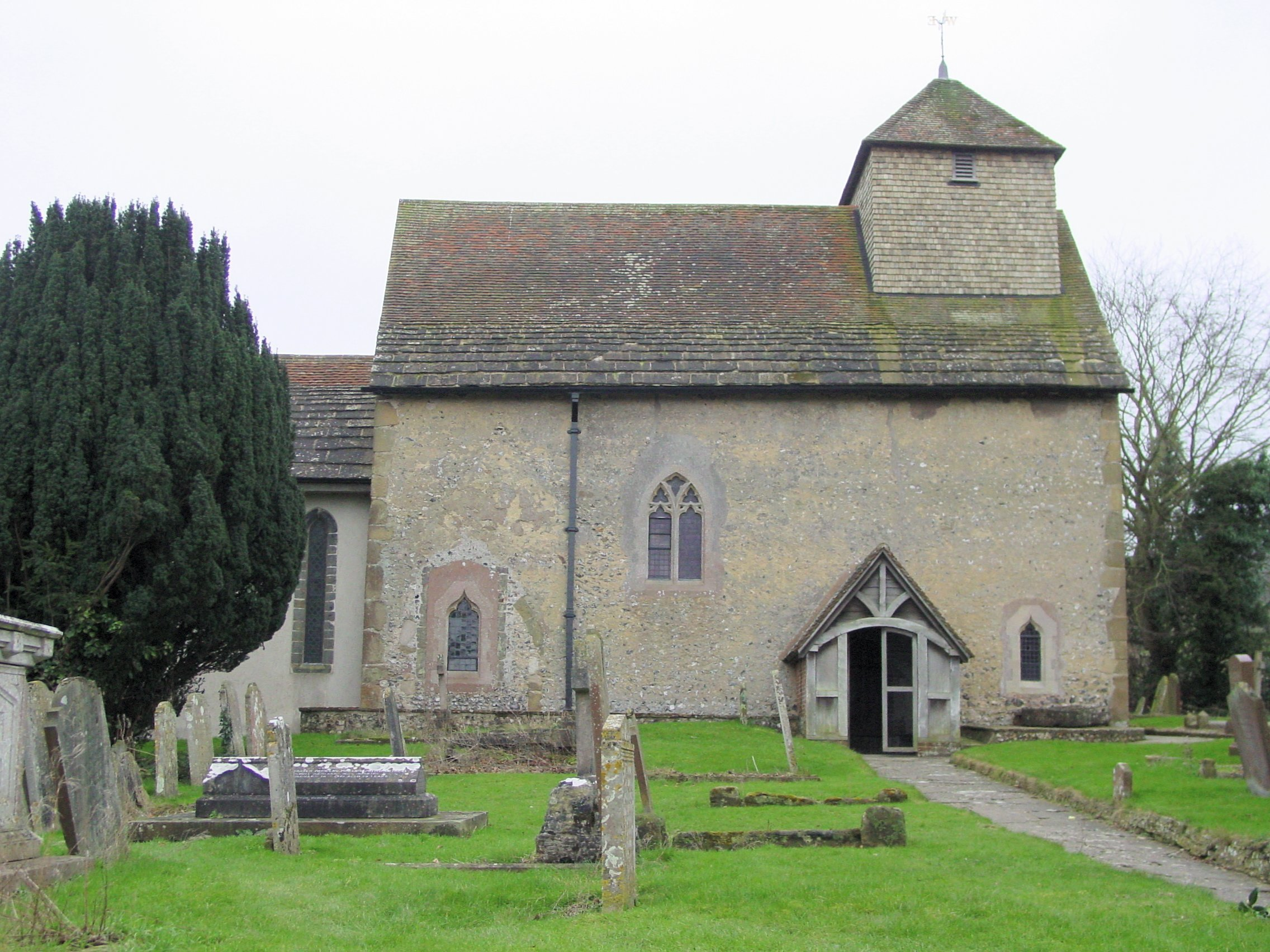
- The church from the north
- St John the Baptist's Church
- 50.9105°N 0.1534°W
- Location: Underhill Lane, Clayton, West Sussex BN6 9PJ
- Country: England
- Denomination: Church of England

History
- Status: Parish church
- Founded: 11th century
- Dedication: John the Baptist

Architecture
- Functional status: Active
- Heritage designation: Grade I
- Designated: 28 October 1957
- Style: Anglo-Saxon

Administration
- Province: Canterbury
- Diocese: Chichester
- Archdeaconry: Horsham
- Deanery: Rural Deanery of Hurst
- Parish: Clayton with Keymer

Clergy
- Vicar: Rev. Alexander Baxter

St John the Baptist's Church is the Church of England parish church of the village of Clayton in Mid Sussex District, one of seven local government districts in the English county of West Sussex. The small and simple Anglo-Saxon building is distinguished by its "remarkable" and extensive set of wall paintings, dating from the early 12th century and rediscovered more than 700 years later. Much of the structural work of the church is 11th-century and has had little alteration. The church, which stands in the middle of a large churchyard and serves the small village of Clayton at the foot of the South Downs, is part of a joint parish with the neighbouring village of Keymer—an arrangement which has existed informally for centuries and which was legally recognised in the 20th century. English Heritage has listed the church at Grade I for its architectural and historical importance.

== History ==
The ancient village of Clayton, situated where the main route from London to Brighton crossed an east–west track at the foot of the South Downs, existed at the time of the Domesday survey in 1086, when it was called Claitune or Claitona. It was at the southern end of the parish of the same name, which covered 1,414 acres (572 ha) of mostly rural land running north (and downhill) from the summit of the South Downs. The manor of Clayton was held at that time by William de Watevile for William de Warenne, who built the nearby Lewes Castle. The church was in the possession of Lewes Priory, which had been given it by de Warenne in 1093. The manor and church in the neighbouring parish of Keymer had the same ownership. The original dedication of St John the Baptist's Church was All Saints—a common dedication during the Anglo-Saxon era.

The standard layout of Anglo-Saxon churches was a tall nave without aisles linked to a smaller, square-ended (not apsidal) chancel by a chancel arch. St John the Baptist's Church follows this form; and the nave and chancel arch, along with parts of the north and south chancel walls, survive from the 11th century. On the north side of the nave, fragmentary remains of a 12th-century porticus (a low side chapel, similar to a transept) can be seen: on the inside, there is a blocked round-headed opening, while on the outside a roofline is visible. A similar porticus of the 13th century existed on the south side; its remnants can still be seen.

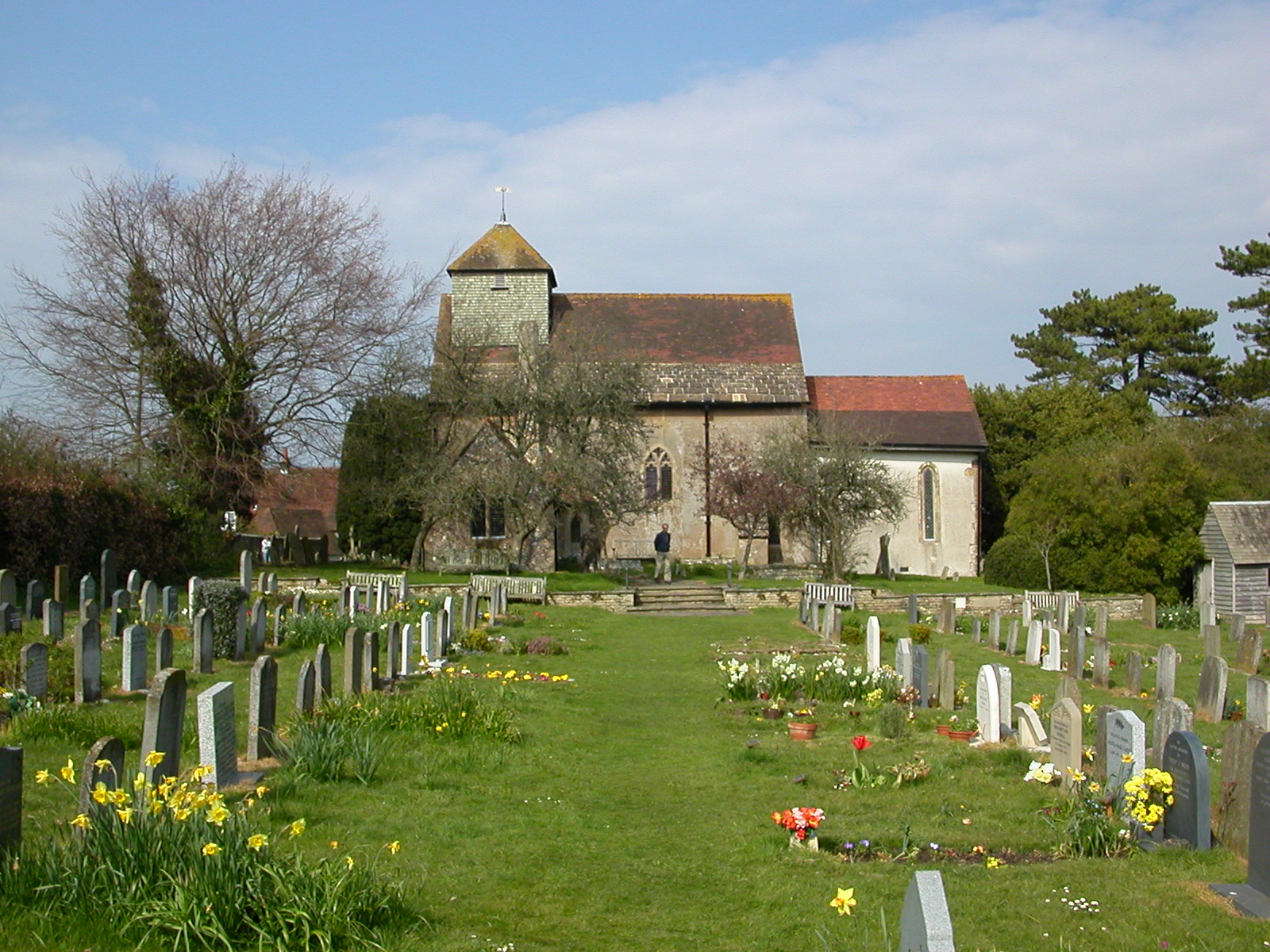
Seen from the south side across the churchyard, the belfry and modern vestry are visible on the left.

The entrance porch on the north wall was erected in the 15th century, but the heavy oak door dates from the Norman era. The entrance was originally on the south side; suggested reasons for its move include avoiding the prevailing wind, which blows off the hills straight into the south wall, or a change in the location of the nearby road in medieval times. The squat wooden belfry at the west end of the nave is also 15th-century, as are two of the three bells. The path leading to the porch is unusually made of "ripplestone"—Horsham sandstone taken from a nearby riverbed.

The chancel was rebuilt in the 19th century, and a vestry was added on the northwest side. Minor restoration work was carried out in the 20th century. A blocked window, discovered in the north wall of the chancel, was found to be an original Anglo-Saxon window. The former side-chapel on the north side was discovered during excavation work in 1918. The lychgate at the entrance to the churchyard was built in the early 1920s by Philip Mainwaring Johnston and serves as Clayton's war memorial. A Falklands War casualty is commemorated, and there is also a military grave from that conflict in the churchyard, where American theatrical producer Marc Klaw is also buried. To commemorate the Millennium, new stained glass was inserted in the west window of the nave; the design received considerable praise.

== Wall paintings ==
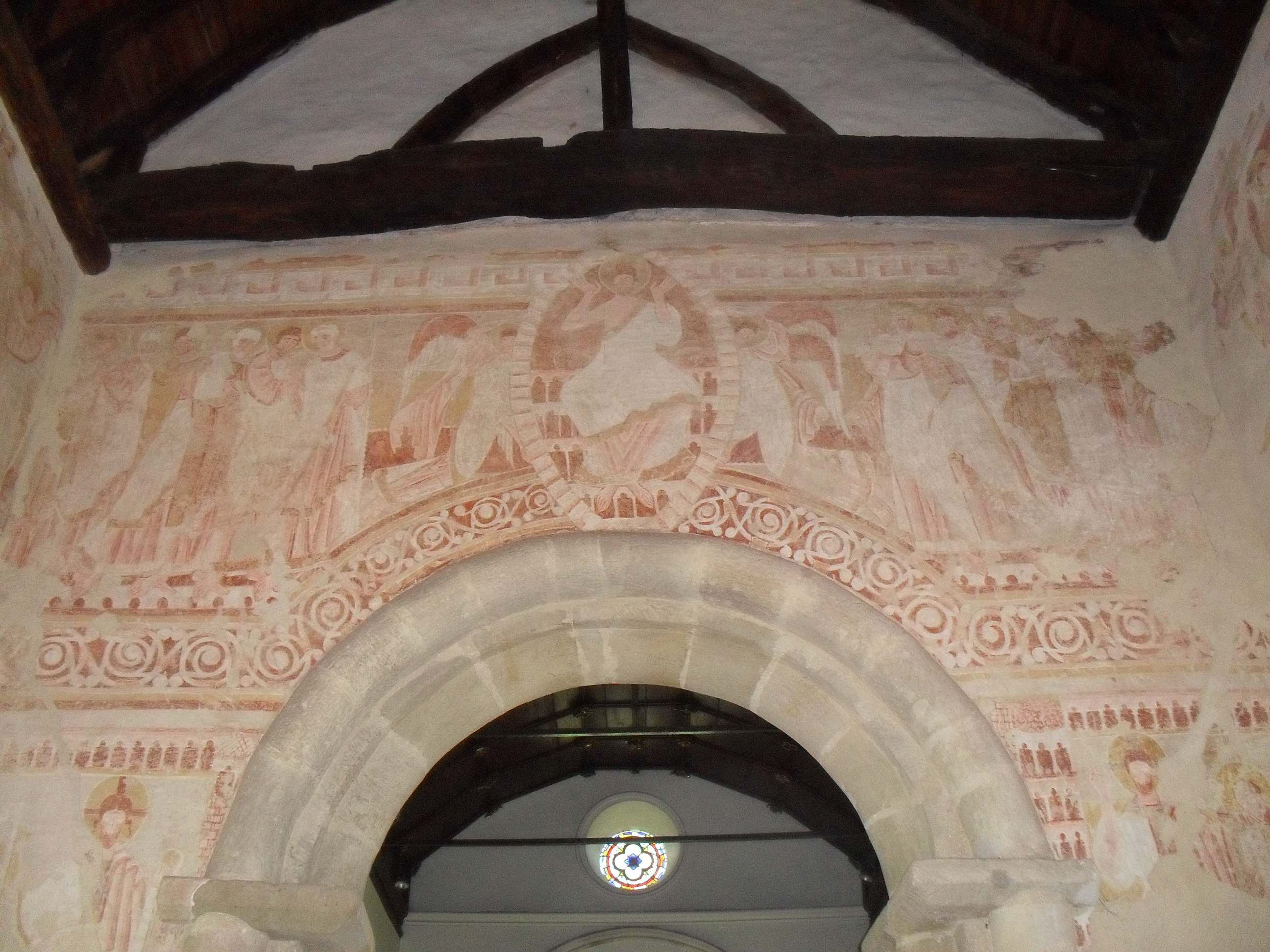
The 12th-century murals over the chancel arch are among the oldest in England.

The most famous feature of St John the Baptist's Church is the array of well-preserved and ancient wall paintings in the nave and on the chancel arch. They are part of a series painted by monks from Lewes Priory; this was the first Cluniac house in England and had close links to its mother priory at Cluny in Burgundy, and the art techniques developed at Cluny from the mid-10th century were very influential. Murals from the same school—known as the Lewes Group—can also be seen at Coombes Church near Shoreham-by-Sea, St Botolph's Church at Hardham and St Michael and All Angels Church at Plumpton, and were once visible at the church in Westmeston as well. The examples at Clayton have been described as "some of the most important in the country", "remarkable", "a fine set", "amazing", "unique in England for their extent, preservation and date", and "graphically representing ... the terrors of Judgment Day". They are also some of the oldest surviving murals in England, although their age is not known for certain. Historians have variously dated them to the 11th century, c. 1080, between 1080 and 1120, c. 1100, "later than 1125", c. 1140, c. 1150 or late 12th century.

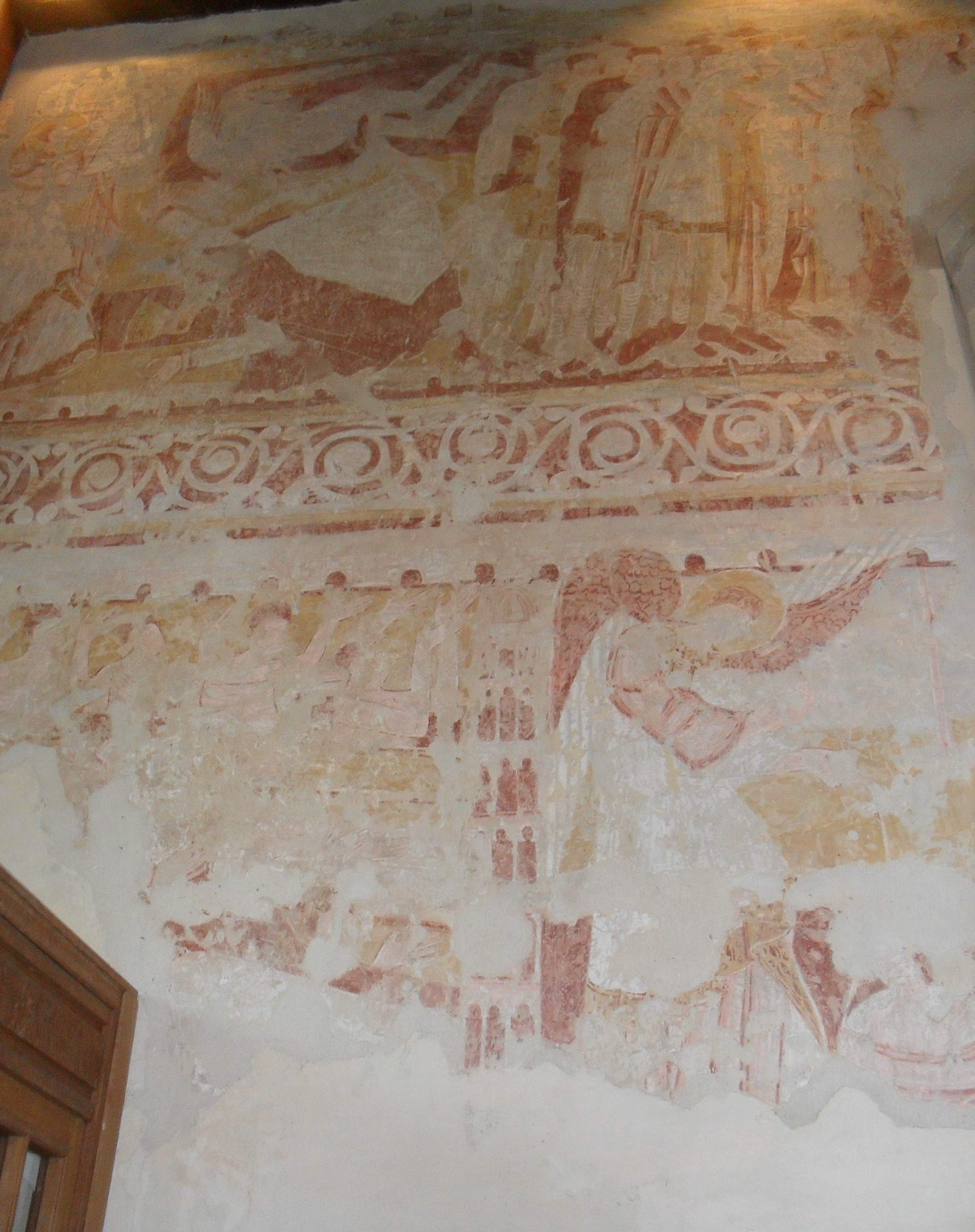
Figures on the north wall include angels and a parade of the blessed.

The murals cover the chancel arch and the east, south and north walls of the nave, and were uncovered between 1893 and 1895 when Charles Eamer Kempe was restoring the interior. More were uncovered during subsequent alterations between 1917 and 1919. Nikolaus Pevsner believed that the west wall would have had similar paintings as well. Most authorities agree that they are frescoes—painted directly on wet plaster. Like the other Lewes Group paintings, they feature a very small range of local pigments in shades of yellow and red (leading to the nickname "bacon-and-egg").

The main subject of the murals is the Day of Judgment, making them an early example of the "Doom" paintings seen in medieval churches across England. Pevsner noticed that the figures had characteristic features: "extremely long and lean, with heavy ... garments, exceedingly small heads ... [and] strange headgear". Centrally placed above the chancel arch is an image of Christ in Majesty in a mandorla held by angels and with apostles on each side. Flanking this are Christ giving the Keys of Heaven to Saint Peter (to the left) and a book to Saint Paul. On the north wall of the nave, a procession (led by bishops) approaches the Heavenly Jerusalem, watched by angels and saints, and the defeat of the Antichrist. Scenes on the south side include angels, one of the Four Horsemen of the Apocalypse, worshipping saints and another procession, this time of the damned: in this dramatic composition, "a spike-heeled devil riding a large beast separates the doomed from the blessed". An angel is also depicted at each corner of the nave: this is another reference to the Day of Judgment, when, according to the Gospel of Mark, "then shall He send His angels, and shall gather together His elect from the four winds, from the uttermost part of the Earth to the uttermost part of Heaven" (Mark 13:27). The paintings are heavy with symbolism, and "give a full interpretation of the Last Judgment": in medieval times such paintings were the most important way of conveying information and narratives to worshippers, many of whom could not read.

In 2010, it was reported that the murals were threatened with damage from bat faeces. A colony of bats—a protected species—were roosting in the church, and church staff had to remove droppings from the walls before each service. Bat urine was also harming the timbers of the roof. A survey by specialists indicated that although the paintings were still "in good condition", their age and fragility increased the risk of damage.

== Architecture and fittings ==
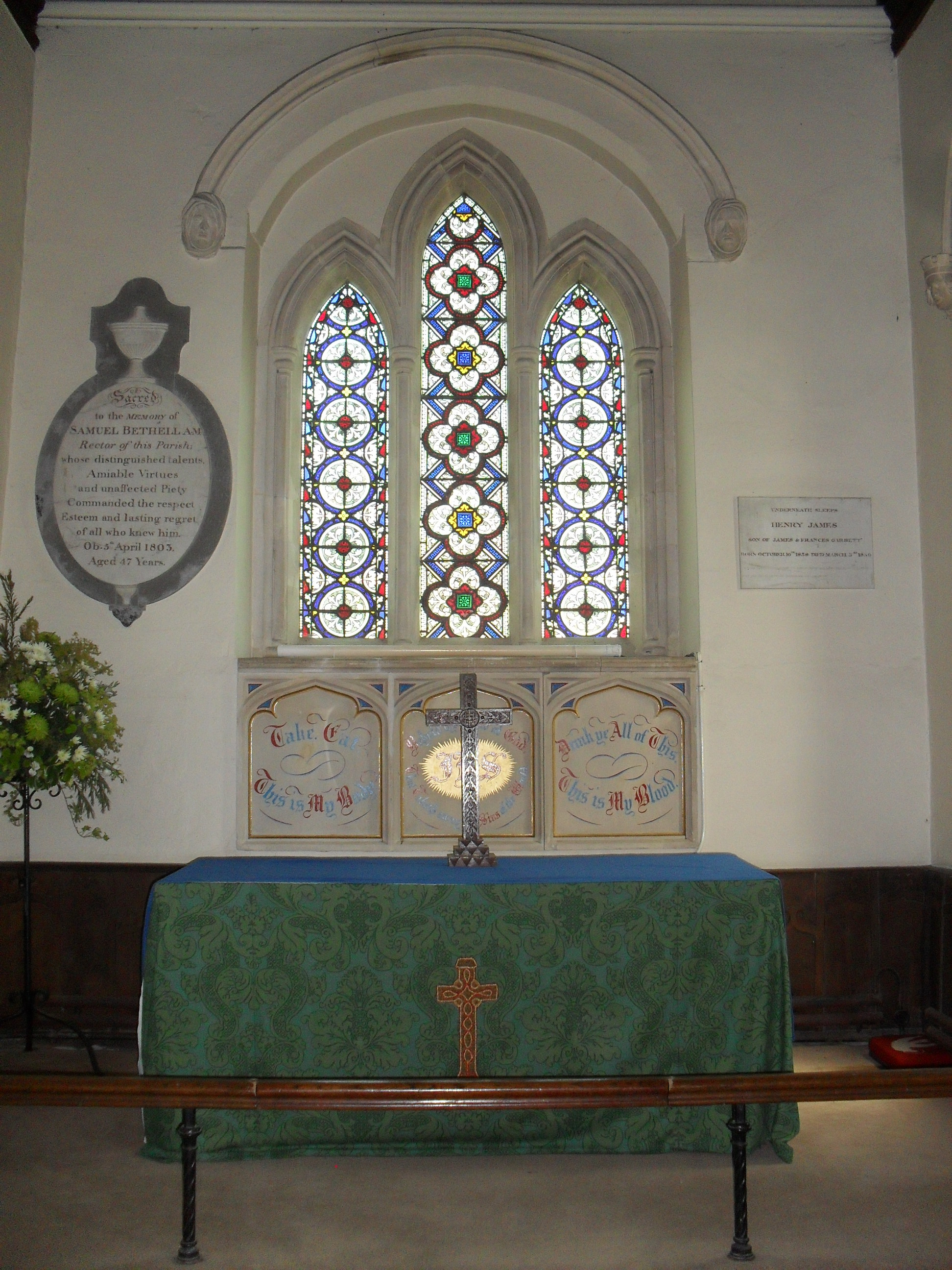
The simple altar sits below the three-light east window of the chancel.

St John the Baptist's Church is a typical example of the simple two-cell (nave and chancel) layout found at many pre-Norman Conquest churches in Sussex. The plan consists of a square-ended chancel, a much taller nave, a porch on the north side, a vestry on the south side and a west-end belfry of timber and shingles. The "tall, thin walls" of the nave give the church a "heartfelt piety". The church is built of flint with some sandstone dressings and quoins, covered with cement in places. The roof is laid with a mixture of red tiles and Horsham Stone slabs.

The "bold", "impressive", "solid and powerful" chancel arch is the principal structural feature inside. It dates from the 11th century and is flanked by a pair of arched recesses, one of which retains some original plasterwork. These may have served as squints originally. The structure dominates the nave through its sheer height, the use of massive square stone blocks with a smooth, plain finish, and the three 10-inch (25 cm) moulded shafts on each side. The jambs terminate in bulky chamfered imposts. The arch has been compared to that of another Grade I-listed Anglo-Saxon church in West Sussex—the slightly older St Nicholas' Church at Worth. Its three bells date from the early 15th century (by Richard Hille), the 1470s (Henry Jurdan) and 1713 (Samuel Knight). Hille owned a foundry in London; his bells are found at several other churches throughout Sussex.

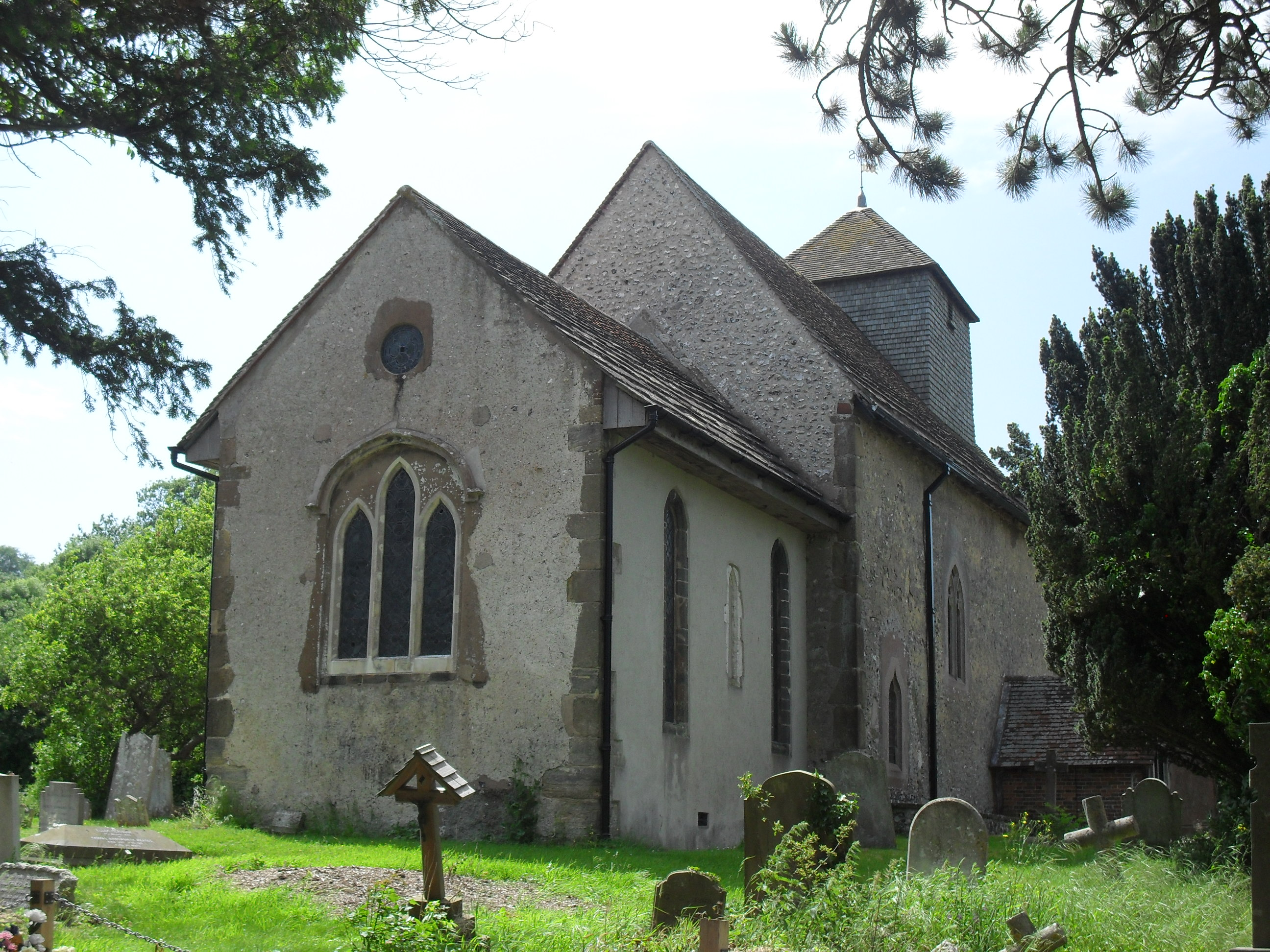
The chancel is lower and shorter than the nave.

The chancel, renewed in the 19th century, measures 19.5 by 13.25 feet (5.94 m × 4.04 m). The east window is a three-light lancet with mullions, set below a segmental-arched hood mould. There are two narrow lancets in the south and north walls as well, and a blocked window of Anglo-Saxon origin on the latter. The walls are just over 2 feet (0.61 m) thick.

The nave formerly had a pair of porticus-style side chapels, but little trace of these remains—although blocked windows and fragments of archways and gabled roofs have been visible since 1918, when they were excavated. The nave's dimensions are 43 by 22.5 feet (13.1 m × 6.9 m), and the walls are about 2.5 feet (0.76 m) thick. The Norman doorway, reset on the north side in its 15th-century porch, have jambs with five stones of irregular length and a five-stone arch. The belfry, at the west end of the nave, sits on top of the roof with no structural link to the inside of the building. It has a shallow pyramid-shaped roof.

Other than the wall paintings, the interior is plain. The ceiling has panelling and simple timberwork, and walls with no murals are plastered. There are some 18th-century Eucharistic objects and a 17-inch (43 cm) brass memorial to Richard Idon, a parson, who died in 1523. He is shown holding a Communion wafer and chalice and clad in vestments. Another brass, slightly older (1508) but consisting solely of an inscription to Thomas a Wode, is hidden under a carpet.

== The church today ==
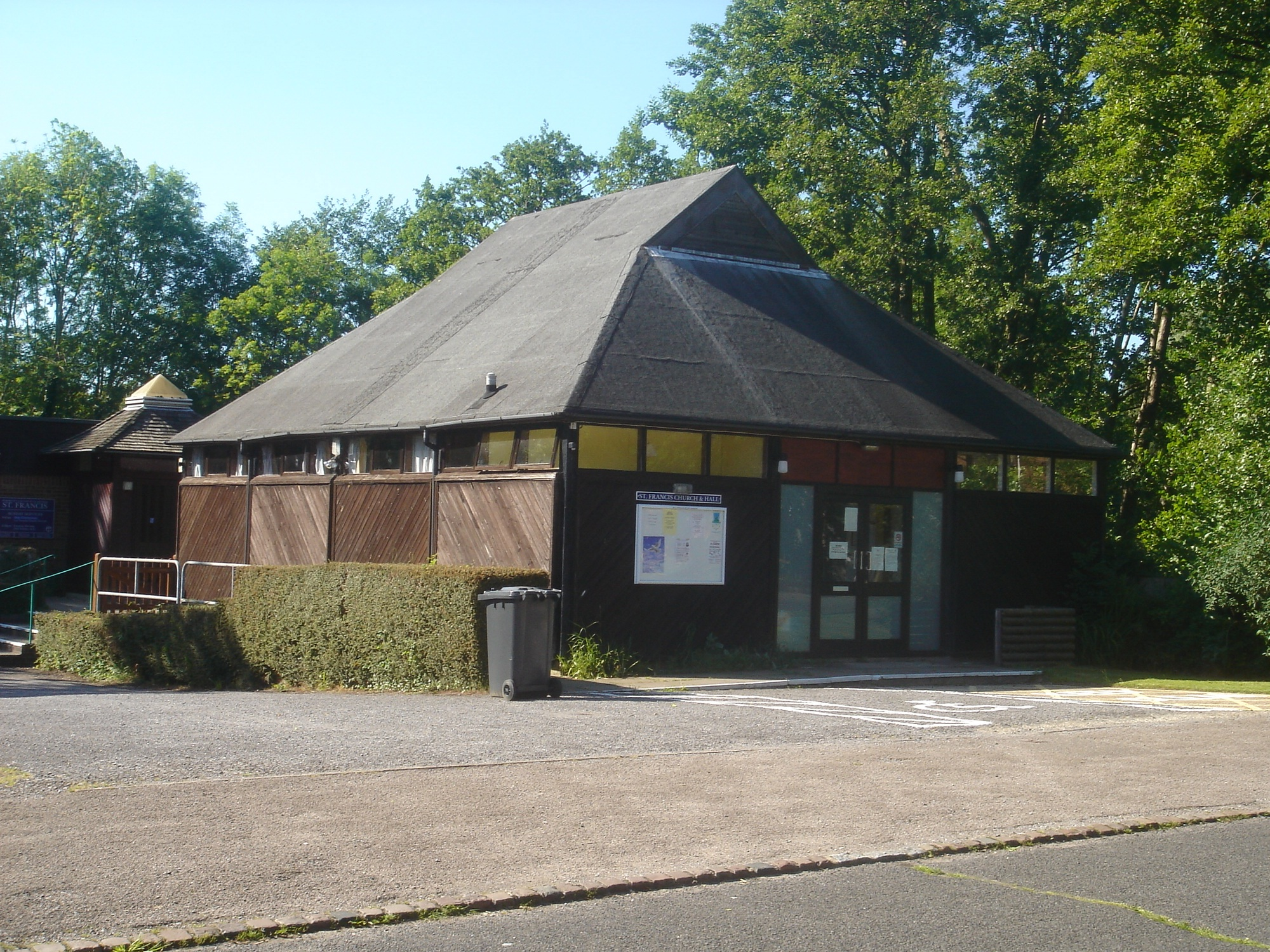
The modern St Francis of Assisi Church in Hassocks is one of two others in the parish.

St John the Baptist's Church was listed at Grade I by English Heritage on 28 October 1957. Such buildings are defined as being of "exceptional interest" and greater than national importance. As of February 2001, it was one of 16 Grade I listed buildings, and 1,028 listed buildings of all grades, in the district of Mid Sussex.

The ecclesiastical parish of Clayton with Keymer covers three villages, each with one Church of England parish church, and surrounding rural areas towards Burgess Hill, Ditchling and Hurstpierpoint. Keymer is served by St Cosmas and St Damian Church, which also has Anglo-Saxon origins but was rebuilt in 1866. Hassocks, now linked to Keymer by postwar residential expansion, was served from St Cosmas and St Damian until 1975, when St Francis of Assisi Church was built. The parishes of Clayton and Keymer, previously separate legal entities, were united from 25 July 1978 by means of an Order in Council.

== See also ==
- Grade I listed buildings in West Sussex
- List of places of worship in Mid Sussex
