= Clayton, West Sussex =

Village in West Sussex, England

Coordinates: 50.91041°N 0.15173°W

Clayton
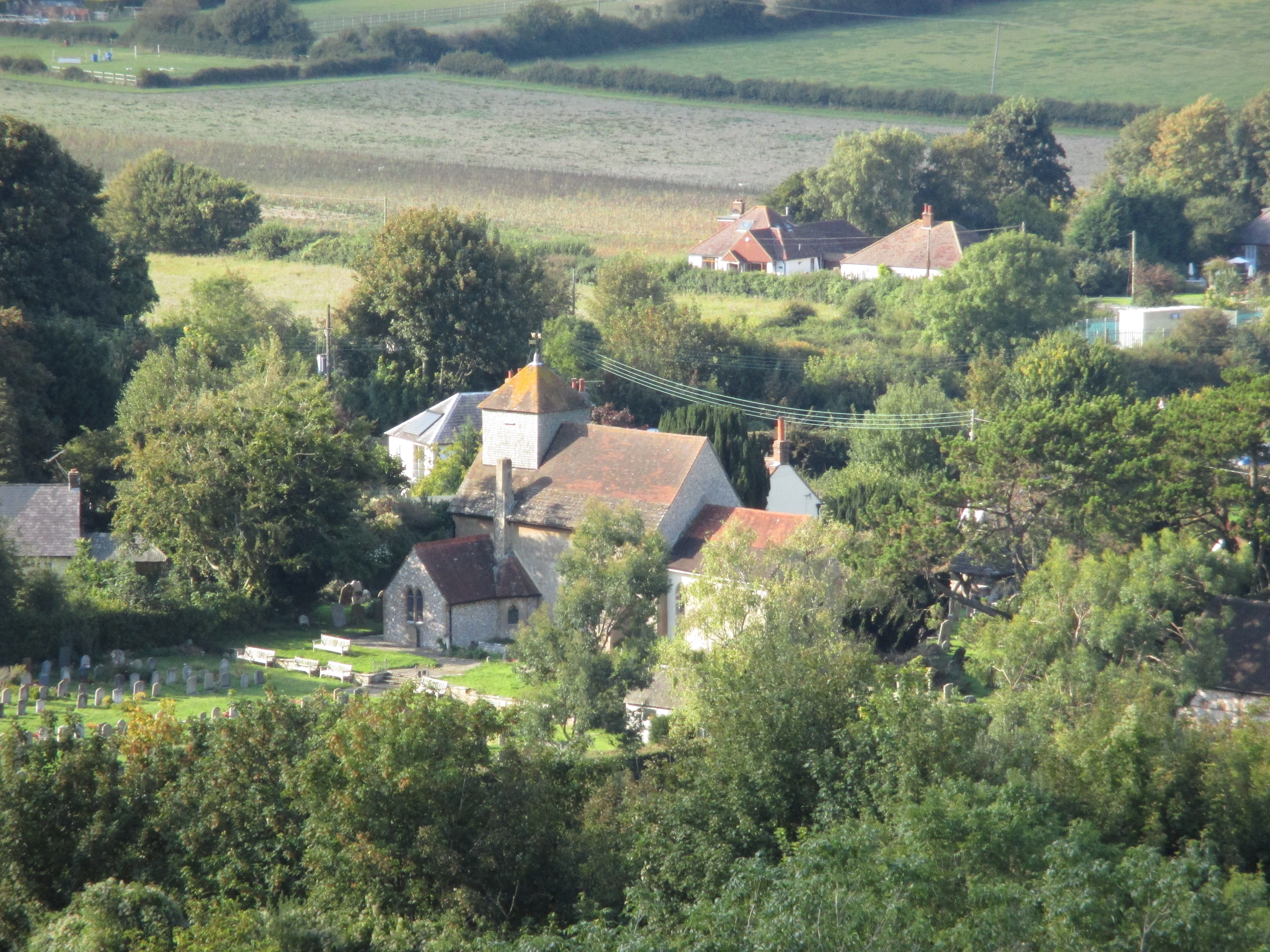
- Church of St. John the Baptist and surroundings

- Location within West Sussex
- OS grid reference: TQ300139
  - London: 41 miles (66 km) N
- Civil parish: Hassocks
- District: Mid Sussex
- Shire county: West Sussex
- Region: South East
- Country: England
- Sovereign state: United Kingdom
- Post town: HASSOCKS
- Postcode district: BN6
- Dialling code: 01273
- Police: Sussex
- Fire: West Sussex
- Ambulance: South East Coast
- UK Parliament: Arundel and South Downs

Clayton is a small village and former civil parish, now in the parish of Hassocks, in the Mid Sussex district, in the county of West Sussex, England. It lies at the foot of the South Downs, 41 miles (66 km) south of London, 6 miles (10 km) north of Brighton, and 28 miles (45 km) east northeast of the county town of Chichester. Other nearby towns include Burgess Hill to the north and Lewes, the county town of East Sussex east southeast. The Clayton Windmills, known as "Jack and Jill", sit on the hill above the village. In 1961 the parish had a population of 1548. On 1 April 2000 the parish was abolished and merged with Hassocks, Burgess Hill and Pyecombe.

The village gives its name to the nearby Clayton railway tunnel on the Brighton Main Line, although the tunnel itself is actually situated in the neighbouring parish of Pyecombe.

== Parish church ==
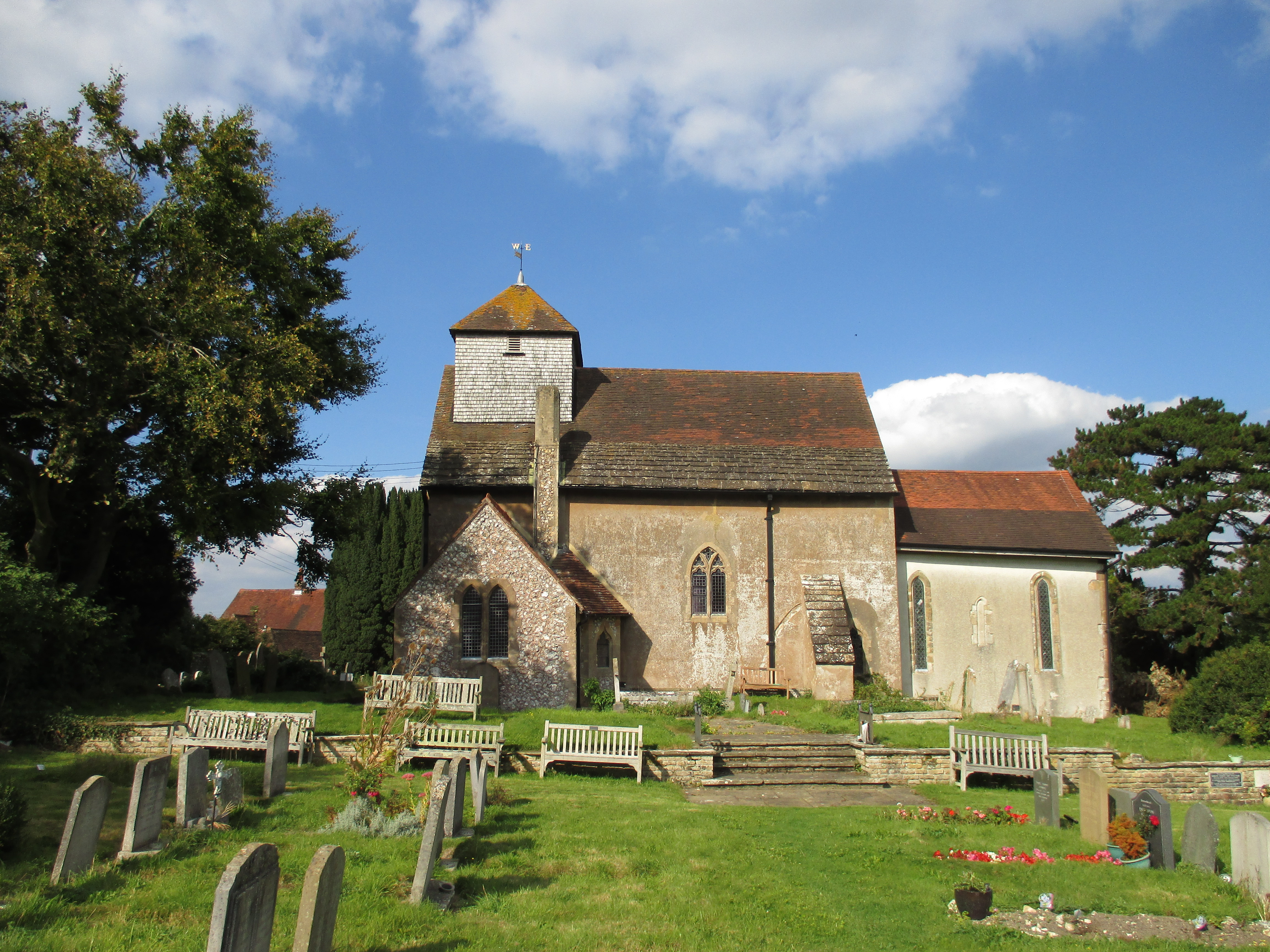
The parish church from the south

The little parish church of St. John the Baptist is an Anglo-Saxon church that has a squat bell turret of shingles with a wrought iron weather vane dated 1781. The church has some magnificent wall murals, for example the Last Judgement, from the mid-12th century (1150–1200). These murals, unique in England for their date and extent, were first brought to light during repair work in 1893 and were probably painted by artists from St Pancras Priory in Lewes. Sir Norman Hartnell, who designed Queen Elizabeth II's wedding gown and coronation dress and served as couturier to Elizabeth II (and previously to The Queen Mother) is buried in the churchyard.

== Clayton Down ==
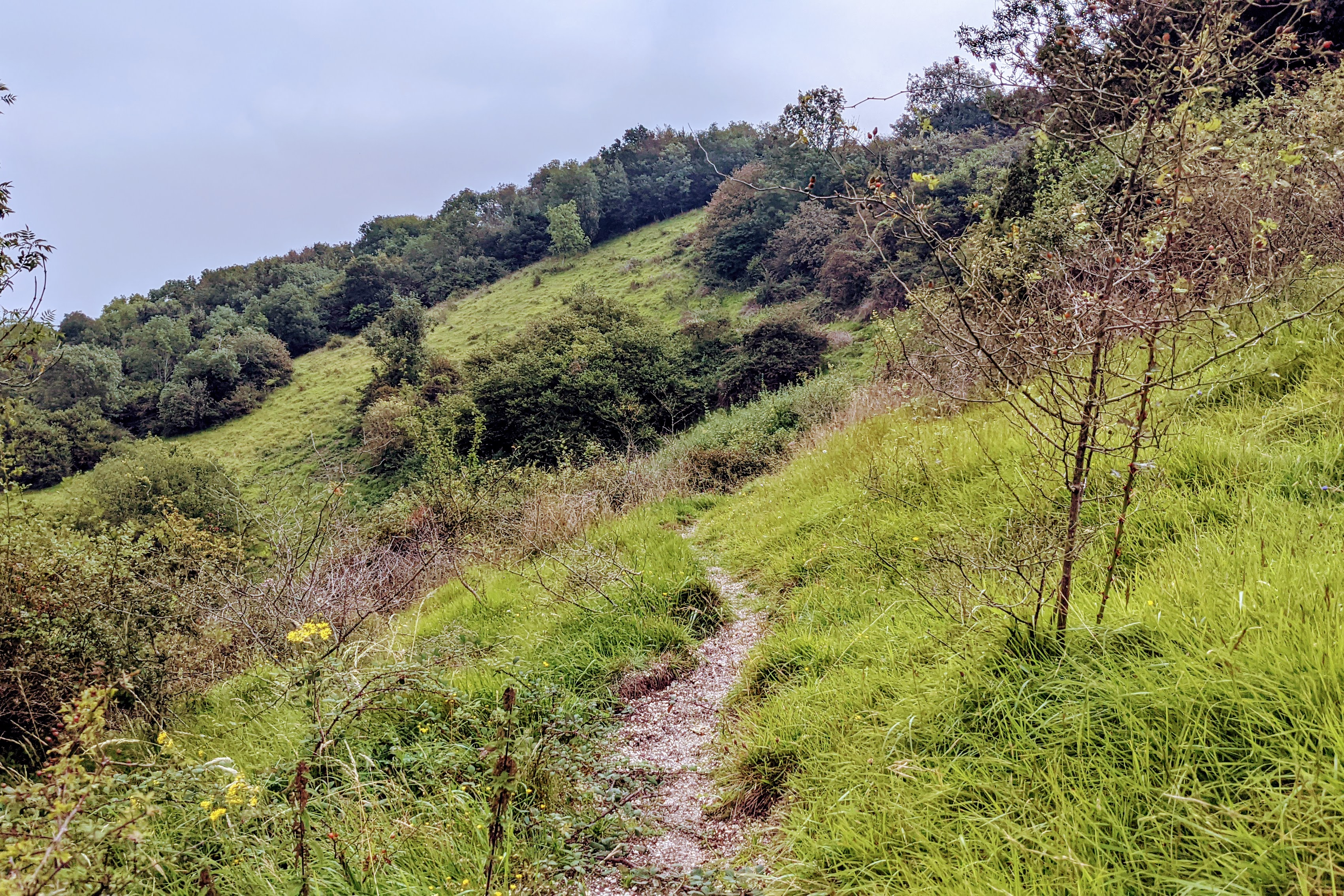
Clayton Down, looking east towards Clayton Holt with Ditching Beacon beyond

On the south side of the village, begins the Downs and the start of the Clayton to Offham Escarpment Site of Special Scientific Interest (SSSI), which stretches east almost as far as Lewes. The scarp slope below Clayton's windmills (TQ 305 136) and as far east as Clayton Holt, has been described by David Bangs, a Sussex field naturalist, as "one of nature's self-grown orchards". Few sites on this part of the Downs can match its richness. There are blackberries, crab apple, four species of Rose, including the apple-scented sweet briar. There are is also sloe berries, pink and orange spindle berries and buckthorn. There may be as many at least twenty-five scrub species, eighteen of which have fleshy and colourful fruits and eleven of which of are members of the rose family. Robin's pincushion can be seen on the roses and dogwood.

== Clayton Holt ==
On the scarp is Clayton Holt (TQ 310 134), a downland wood with at least thirteen ancient woodland indicator species, including two big hybrid large-leaved/small-leaved limes growing at the base of slope. Up until 1838 there was a large-leaved lime there, a true relic of past forests. The wood is also one of the best places on the Downs to see veteran beeches. The lesser butterfly orchid, which is much rarer than its ‘greater’ cousin, has also been found there. Fungi are mostly found along the base of slope or on the rotting trunks of fallen beech. Under the beech there are several earthstar fungi.

Clayton Holt and its surrounding woodland is the setting of the rural fantasy book - Jamie and the Tree Troll: a new legend(sic) of the South Downs in Sussex, by Zsolt Kerekes

== Recreation ==
For the size of village there is a large recreation ground located at the west end of the village with a village hall, children's play area and two football pitches.

Dame Vera Lynn and her husband bought the twenty two room house, Clayton Holt in 1944 with its 198 acres of land after her return from entertaining troops in Burma.

== Notable people ==
Elizabeth Hitchener was born in 1783 and brought up here where her father ran the Friar's Oak inn. Hitchener was a schoolteacher who was a soul mate of Percy Bysshe Shelley.

Katie Johnson, an actress best known for her acclaimed performance as the elderly Mrs Wilberforce in the 1955 film The Ladykillers, was born here in 1878.

Sir Edward Michelborne, a soldier and adventurer, who also held a seat in Parliament lived at Hammonds Place.

== London to Brighton Way Roman road ==
The London to Brighton Way is thought to have passed close to Clayton as it climbed the South Downs escarpment.

== New Road ==
New Road between Ditchling and Clayton (part of the B2112) was a branch of the turnpike road from Newchapel (in Surrey) to Brighton, via Ditchling. It was authorised by an act of Parliament passed in 1830:

An Act for more effectually repairing and maintaining the Road from New Chappel in the County of Surrey to Ditcheling Bost Hills in the County of Sussex, and from thence to the Town of Brighthelmston in the same County; and also for making and maintaining a Branch of Road from the town of Ditcheling to Clayton in the County of Sussex (11 Geo. 4 & 1 Will. 4. c. xviii)

== Gallery ==
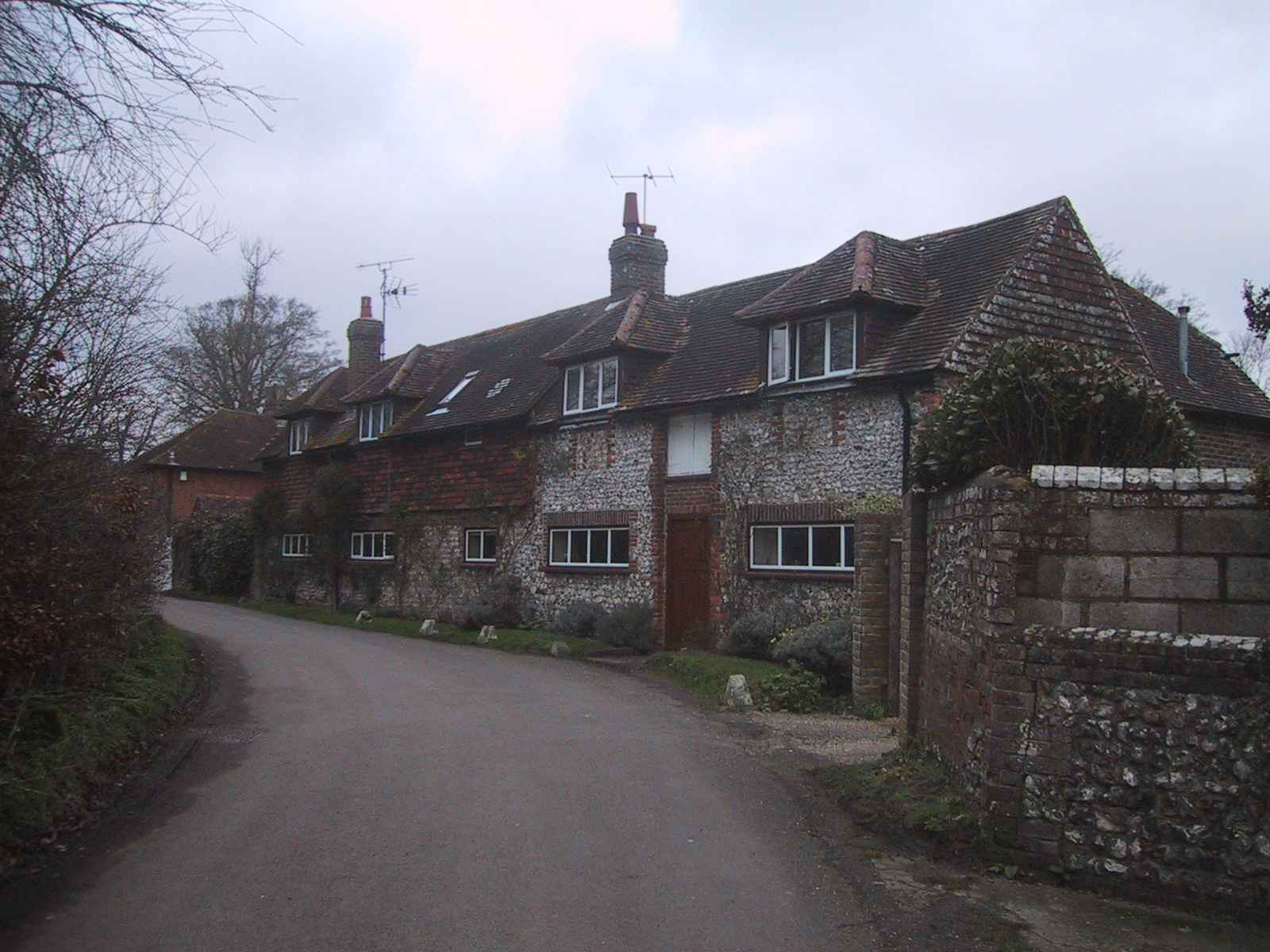
Clayton village

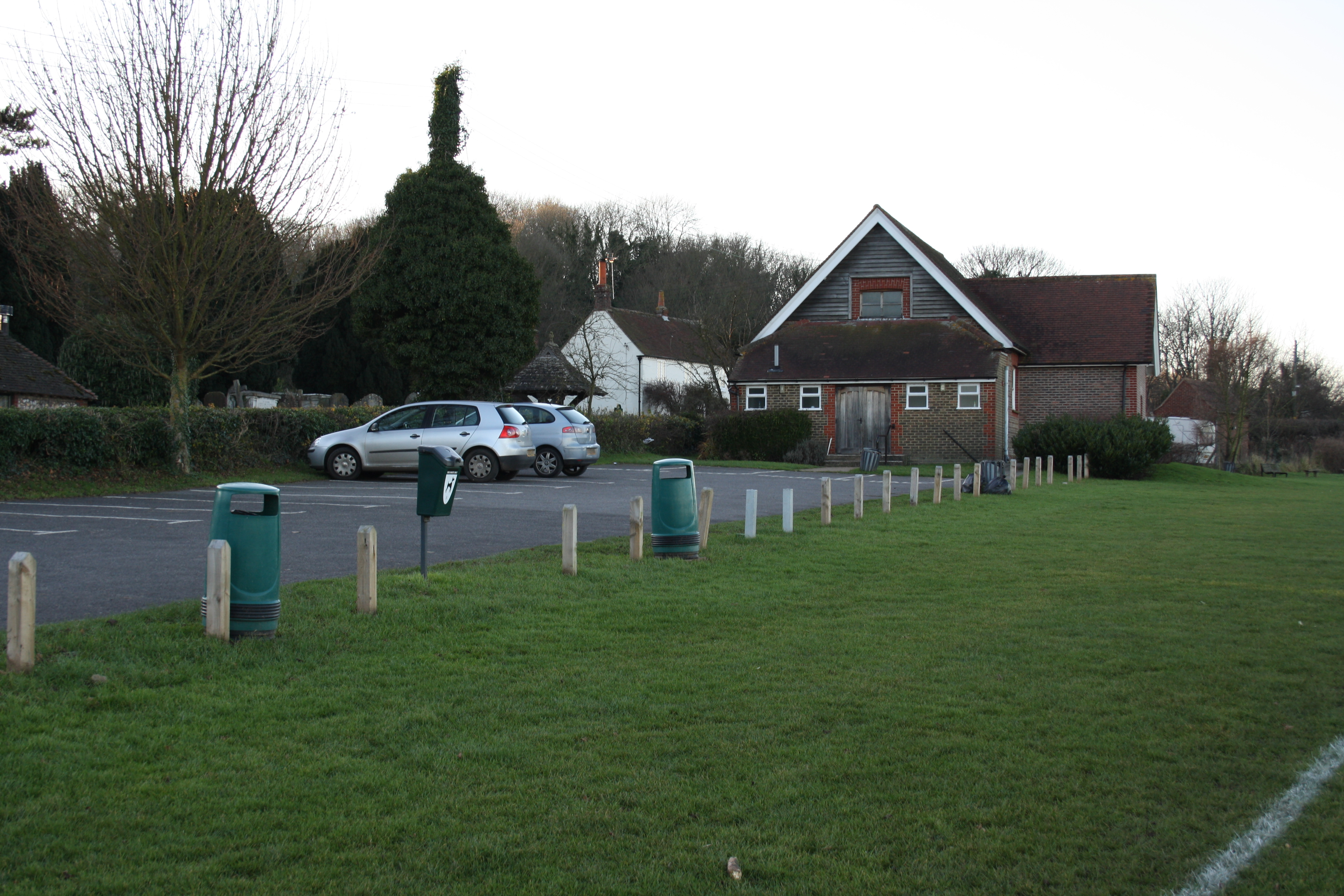
Village hall.

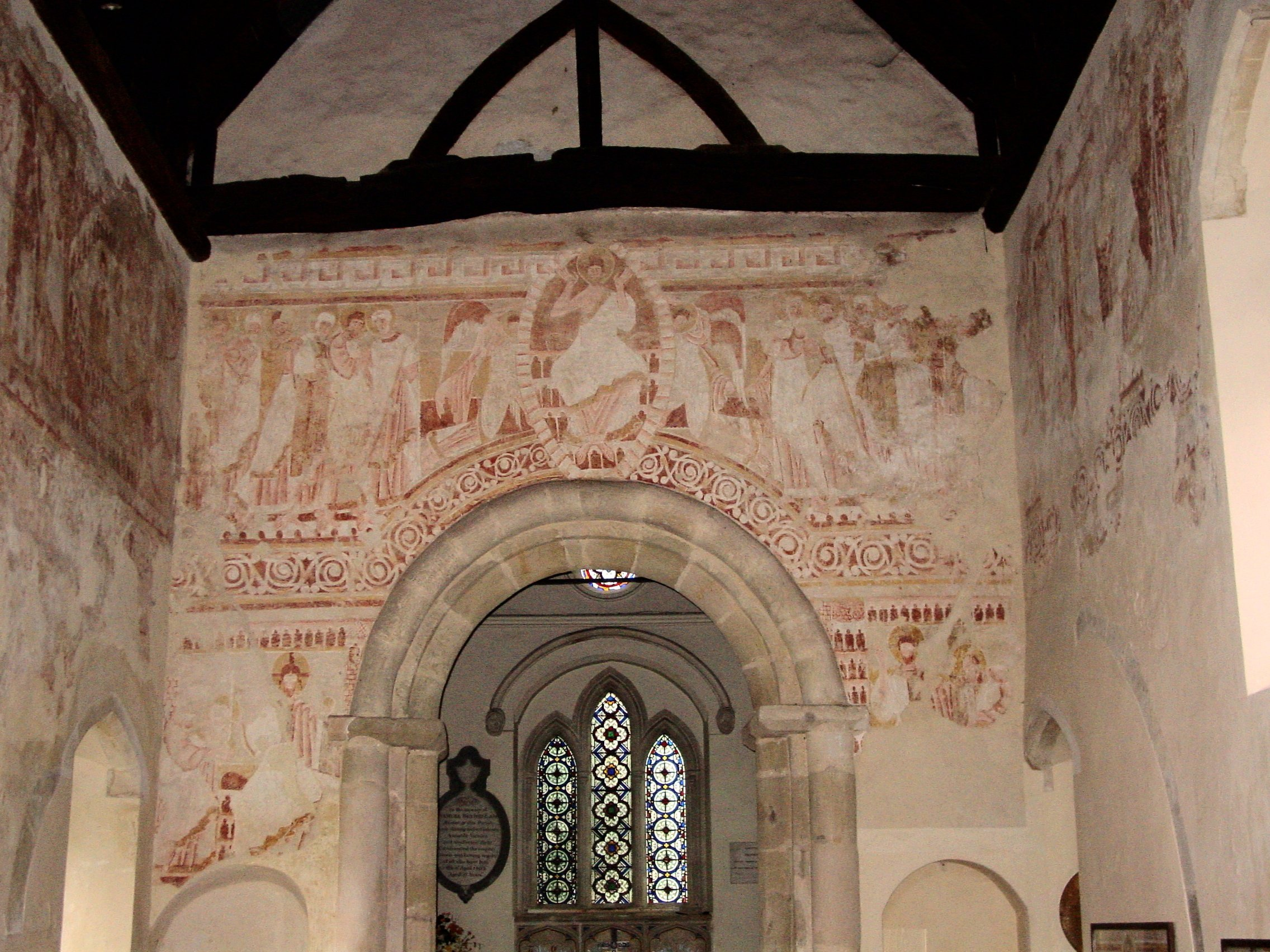
Church interior

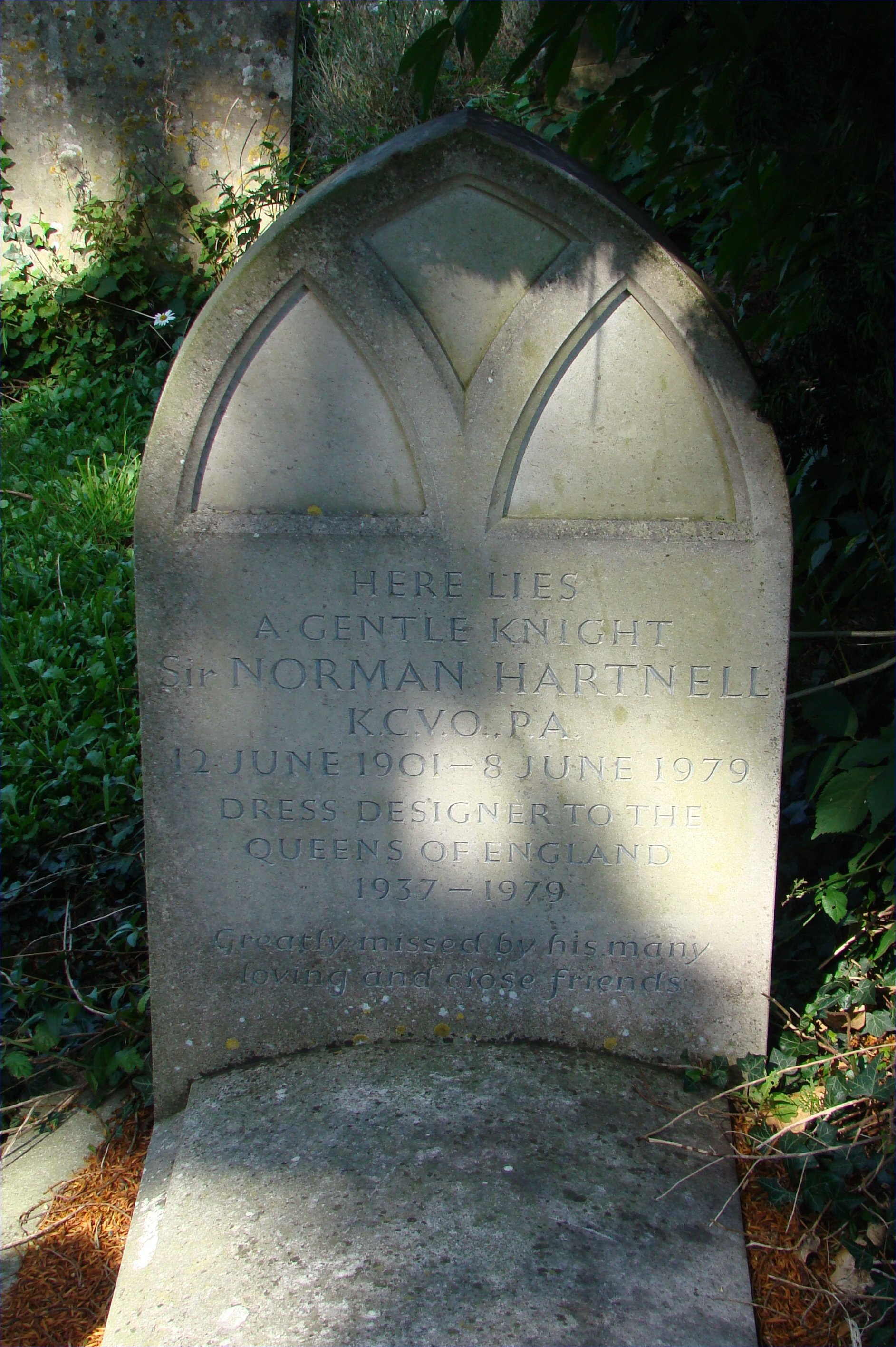
Norman Hartnell's grave
