= Ansty and Staplefield =

Civil parish in West Sussex, England

Coordinates: 51.002°N 0.178°W

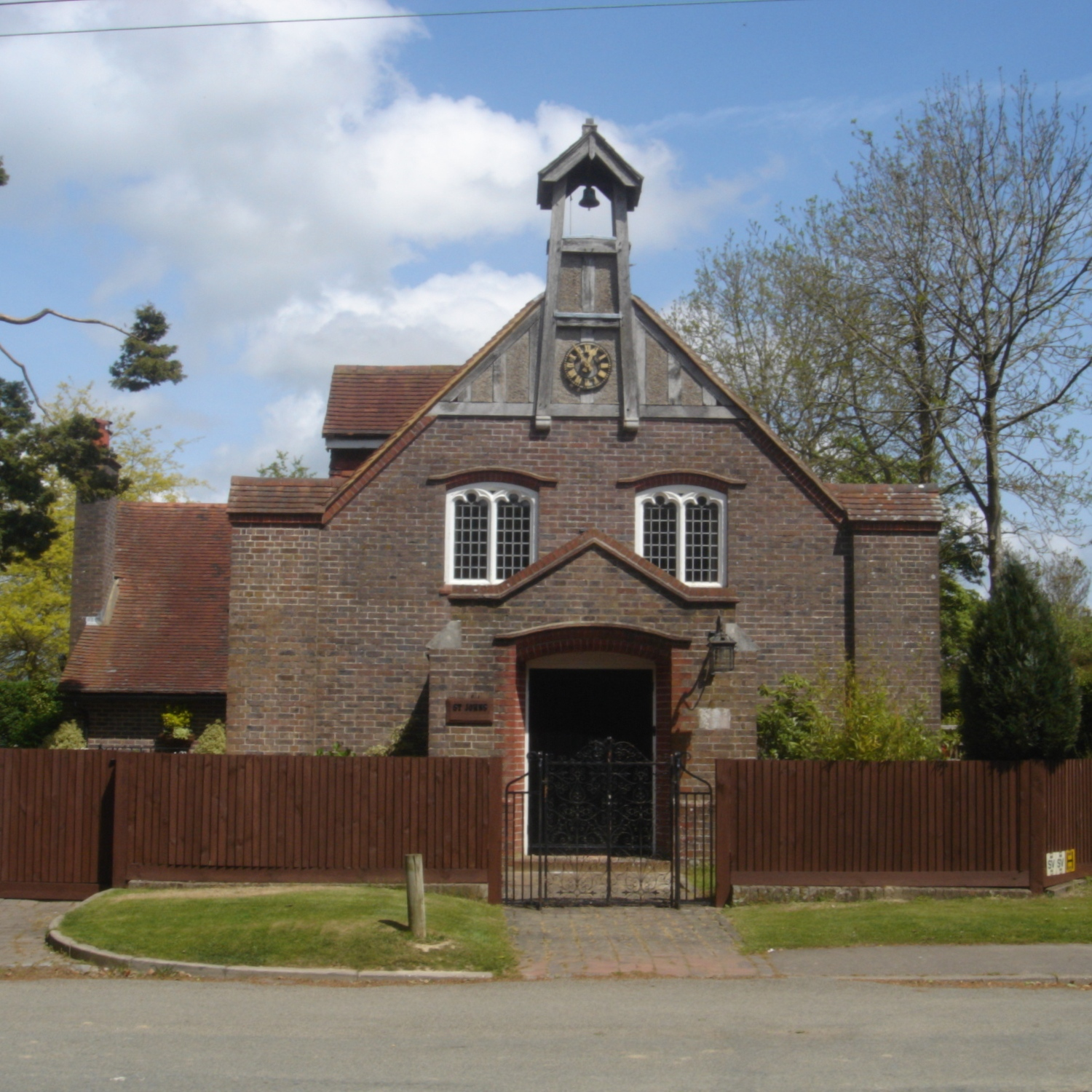
- St John's Chapel, Ansty

- Location within West Sussex
- Area: 38.69 km^{2} (14.94 sq mi)
- Population: 1,574 2001 Census; 1,756 (2011 Census)
  - Density: 41/km^{2} (110/sq mi)
- OS grid reference: TQ279241
  - London: 35 miles (56 km) N
- Civil parish: Ansty and Staplefield
- District: Mid Sussex
- Shire county: West Sussex
- Region: South East
- Country: England
- Sovereign state: United Kingdom
- Post town: HAYWARDS HEATH
- Postcode district: RH17
- Dialling code: 01444
- Police: Sussex
- Fire: West Sussex
- Ambulance: South East Coast
- UK Parliament: Mid Sussex; Horsham
- Website: http://www.anstystaplefield-pc.gov.uk/

Ansty and Staplefield, previously Cuckfield Rural, is a civil parish in the Mid Sussex district of West Sussex, England, covering an area from the north-west side of Burgess Hill, the whole lying around but mostly to the west of Cuckfield civil parish, from which it was created in 1894 under the Local Government Act 1894. It includes the settlements of Ansty in the south, Staplefield to the north-west and Brook Street to the north-east. It is the largest civil parish in West Sussex, covering an area of 3,869 hectares (14.94 mi^{2}), and has a population of 1574 (2001 Census), increasing to 1,756 at the 2011 Census.

Landmarks include Borde Hill Garden, and Tyes Place, an historic mansion.

== Ansty ==
Ansty is a small settlement which has a number of old houses, such as Leigh Manor. It is surrounded by many areas of natural beauty.

== Staplefield ==
Staplefield (TQ 276 281) lies on the old London to Brighton Road, which was shifted west to its present alignment two centuries ago. It was an ancient hub at the head of the navigable Ouse. The village is strung around Staplefield Common, which still has its old openness, with a cricket pitch and pub. Chamomile is common on the west side and near the war memorial.

Old archaic heathy vegetation including meadow fungi, Betony and Heath Bedstraw hold on. Staplefield Churchyard is richer, and as many as sixteen meadow Waxcap, Hygrocybe fungi have been recorded (making it the third best site in middle Sussex) and in spring you may see Green Winged and Spotted Orchids, Pepper Saxifrage, Bitter Vetch, Zig Zag Clover, Spring Sedge, Betony, and even Cowslips just clinging on amid many other herbs and grasses. Along Brantridge Lane to the east is the Old Hall mansion and park - all heavy-duty lake construction and earth moving and screen planting. It has a mock classical temple folly on its lake island.

== Notable buildings and areas ==
Notable areas around Ansty and Staplefield

The parish runs between the A23 London Road, which runs along the west boundary of the county, and Haywards Heath. Its natural beauty is being diminished by the many housing developments and poor rural planning. Locals are continue to campaign to protect the remaining natural treasures in the area.

Copyhold Gill, near Heaselands, and Freeks Woods are as fine as the best protected places in the Weald, yet lie in a landscape without statutory protection. There are a number of little streams between Stairbridge and Bishopstone Lanes that are rich in wildlife. The surrounding ground is wet Weald clay before it rises to the sands of Foxashes Wood. Here there are tattered stands of dried fleabane and marsh thistle, rush and tussock grass, knapweed, angelica, bracken and golden crab apples.

Most well known are Bedelands' superb flower meadows, but like the rest, it is threatened by the looming developments proposed on all sides. For in the gap between Haywards Heath and Burgess Hill huge housing developments are proposed, surrounding the Bedelands Farm meadows and woods nature reserve, and sprawling northwards from the line of the A2300 Burgess Hill-A23 Link Road. They are calling this the 'Northern Arc'.

=== Bedelands and surrounding area ===
Bedelands LNR (Local Nature Reserve) is best known for its archaic flower meadows (e.g. TQ 320 210). There are seven of them, each with a different history and character. Buttercup and ox eye daisy dominate visually. Yellow rattle is abundant over much of the meadows, and hosts the scarce grass rivulet moths. Bedelands is their greatest Sussex stronghold. The ground is mainly Wealden Clay.

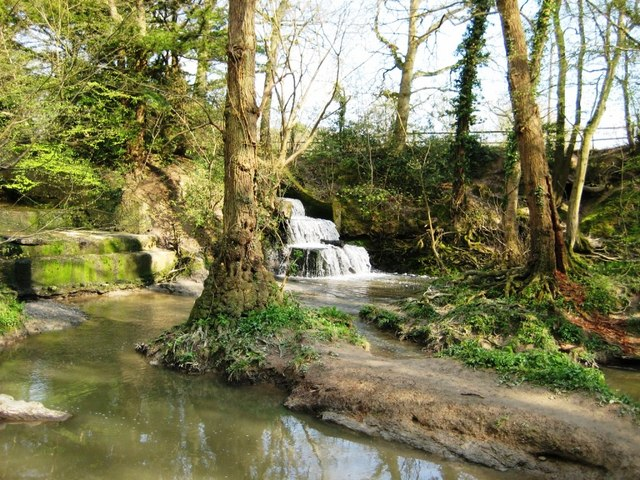
Overflow from Valebridge Pond

To the west, Watford Meadow and Wet Meadow (with its boardwalk) feels like a medieval assart from a Wealden forest. It has ragged robin and sneezewort The three eastern meadows were part of Valebridge Common (TQ 321 210) until its enclosure, and that history is reflected by the names: Valebridge Common Field, and Furze Common Field.

Big Wood, Watford Wood, Long Wood, and Leylands Wood benefit from the management of the District Council and the Friends of Burgess Hill Green Circle. The Wasp Beetle seems to be particularly common. Bumblebees are everywhere, with burnet companion moth and common blue butterfly. The flowers of May host many beautiful spiders, like the Yellow crab spider, the Cucumber Green Spider (often near hedges) and a host of others.

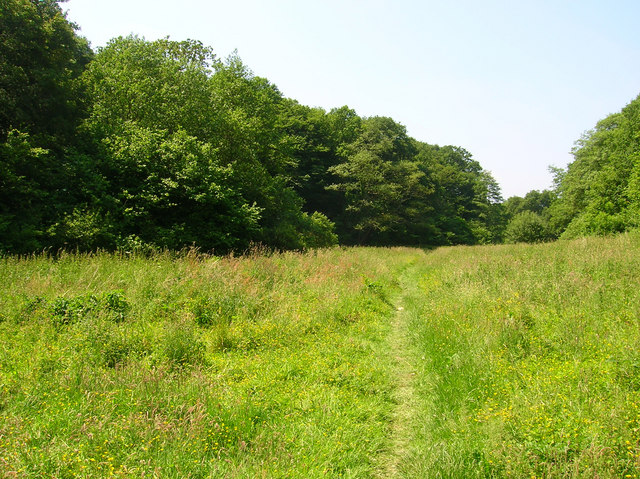
Footpath, Big Wood

Freeks Lane to the west of Bedelands is the direct descendant of the straight Roman road, but 1800 years of traffic have led it to weave in more relaxed fashion between huge old oak trees and rich hedgerows colourful with woodland flowers. In Freeks Farm Wood (TQ 316 210) overlooking the fording, the wild service tree is clustered along the bank top. All around in the wood are very tall sessile oak poles. There are remnants of struggling coppice of hazel, hornbeam and holly. It is a shady, wood of bluebell and wood anemone with many other old woodland plants, like field rose on the boundary with Freeks Farm meadow (TQ 316 209) which is archaic and colourful, and has grizzled skipper.

North of Bedelands and Clearwaters Farm the Wealden Clay gives way to sandstones. The ground rises beyond ancient Kiln Wood (TQ 329 219) to meet painful new built development on the south edge of Haywards Heath.

=== Around Stairbridge Lane ===
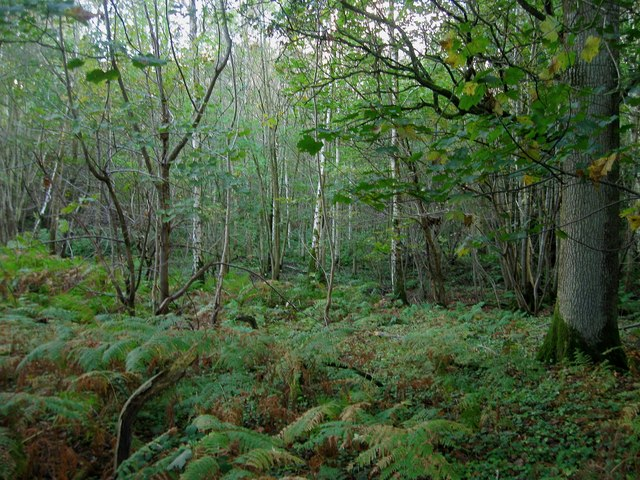
Foxashes Wood

Between Stairbridge and Bishopstone Lane, despite the noise pollution near to the A23, this countryside remains special. Lovell's Farmstead (TQ 274 223) has tall chimneys, ancient barns of herringboned ironstone and ashlar, an ancient oak and little ponds. Behind it are large woods. Foxashes Wood (TQ 280 224) is ancient, with much Sweet Chestnut coppice, some recently cut. The richest part is along the eastern boundary stream. Chaites Wood (TQ 275 219) is mostly secondary.

Stairbridge Lane (TQ 273 209) has at least two working farms (Stairbridge and Field Place) and often wide, grassy, mown verges. Chaites Farmstead (TQ 269 214) has a range of good Victorian and early 20th century outbuildings, including granary and threshing barn of sandstone, and big tiled roofs. Little Wortleford Wood (TQ 278 212) running down to the clay banks of the Adur, is emblematic of the best of the Low Weald. Bluebells are almost 100% dominant, under Oak and Hazel, with large Hornbeam coups and Crab Apple. Cuckoos once called, distant and near, and they can still today.

=== Around Bishopstone Lane ===
On the meadow banks of the Adur, east and west of the Wood, Demoiselle(of both species) cluster in the reed beds. In Maytime Wortleford Bridge (TQ 282 210) on Bishopstone Lane has Wild hop sprawling over the bushes, frothing Cow Parsley, rampant Dog Rose, Sallow cotton from the bushes by the gurgling weir, and rich insect life. There is only a slight smell from the large sewage works upstream. The meadow to the east () is flowery and there are Glowworms on the sometimes meandering, sometimes sunken Bishopstone Lane.TQ 284 211

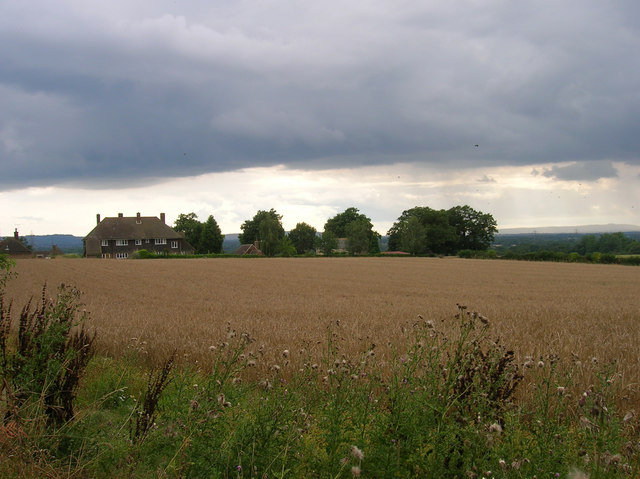
Hilders Farm

Hilders Farm and Bishopstone Farm, form a huddle, with a cluster of special old buildings, including weatherboarded and rubblestone barns. Three meadows to the south west, (TQ 280 216), retain their archaic vegetation (2014) with Dyer's Green weed, Sneezewort, Trailing Tormentil, Pepper Saxifrage, and Betony. Close by Legh Manor and Barn, (TQ 288 222), also form a fine old group. The Manor used to belong to the Sussex Archaeological Society, and be open to the public.

=== Long Wood, Pickwells Shaw and the centre (northwest of Ansty) ===
David Bangs has been described as "good countryside to get mildly lost in" and describe the oldest place names of the area as evoking untamed qualities. He says, "Only the noise of the London Road anchors you in present time". Names he lists include Moorfields Farm; Horsmanhoad and Hoadsherf (hoad = 'heath'); Barnsnape (probably 'steep boggy land'); Thorndean ('thorny swine pasture'), Pookchurch Pit, (TQ 279 248 (puca = 'goblin'); Broxmead ('brocc smeagel' = Badger hole); and Raggetts ('ra geat' = Roe Deer gate).

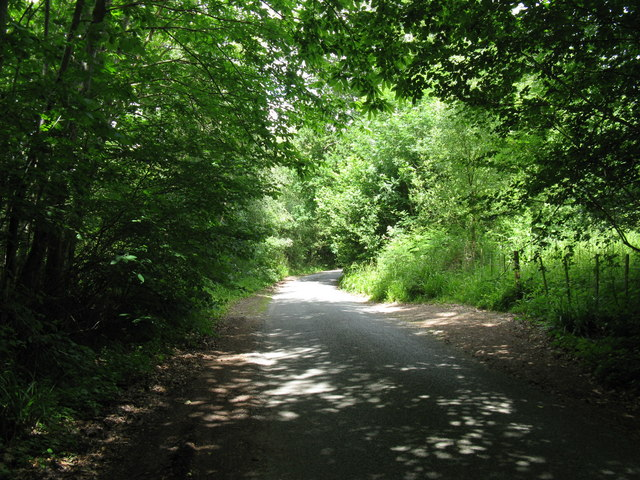
Pickwell Lane descending between Black Forest on the left and Ragget's Wood to the right

At Buncton Lane or Pickwells Lane the woods become bigger with running streams the moment you enter, e.g. (TQ 271 224). Many of these woods are modified by modern conifer plantings, but some are in the process of restoration, and there are large new woods connecting fragmented ancient woods. There are Wild Daffodils here and there, Scarlet elf cap in wet spots in early spring, and Violet Helleborine orchid can be found under summer's shady canopy.

Walking up Pickwell's Lane there is a Sessile Oak giant on the east side bank (TQ 280 233), with its massive clean bole, shooting upwards. Sessile Oak is a feature of these woods, with a grove in the south east corner of Long Wood, (TQ 281 239) by the footpath and the field edge. There are big wooded pits on the Wood's north slope, probably dug for Grinstead Stone. Old Hoadsherf Farm, (TQ 285 236), has the quality of an assart, scooped out of the forest. In Ragget's Wood it is new planted, but Pickwells Shaw (TQ 282 232) has sessile oak too. The Black Forest, TQ 280 233, is modern conifer planting, now with much Birch, but old caravans, huts, chalet, earth moving, and builders' materials, make an ugly mess (2012).

=== Cuckfield Park ===
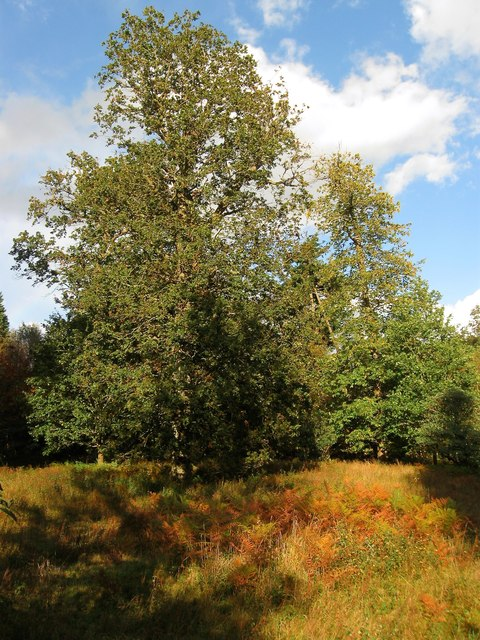
Ragget's Wood

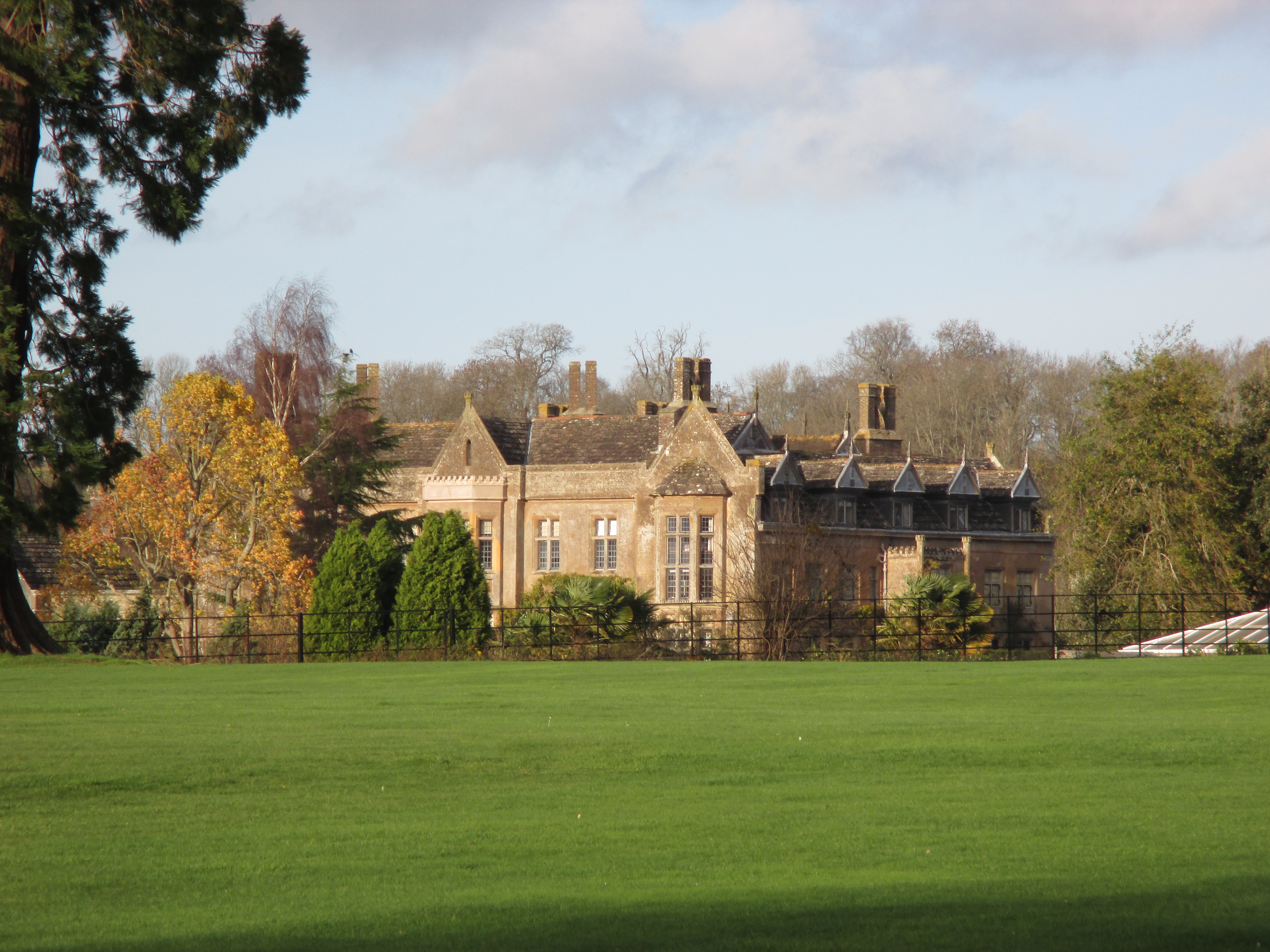
Cuckfield Park, Cuckfield

Cuckfield Park was originally a deer park. After the partition of the estates of the failed de Warenne male line, and the disparking of their deer parks, a member of the new class of plutocratic iron masters built Cuckfield Park mansion, TQ 298 244, in 1580, to the west of the church. He may have used stones that remained from the old hunting lodge of the de Warenne's, which stood near the church's south wall. Features include a kitchen garden, deer park, lakes, and a fine lime avenue. It has a brick gatehouse with four octagonal turrets.

Cuckfield Park, around the house, sadly has no ancient trees left. The best of it is New England Wood, TQ 298 249, north of the house, an ancient woodland nature reserve around a gill. The north verge at the western end of the Cuckfield bypass, TQ 297 239, has colourful archaic meadow vegetation, with much Dyers Greenweed (2012). Between the bypass and the church is the long established Laines Organic Farm.

=== Deaks Lane ===
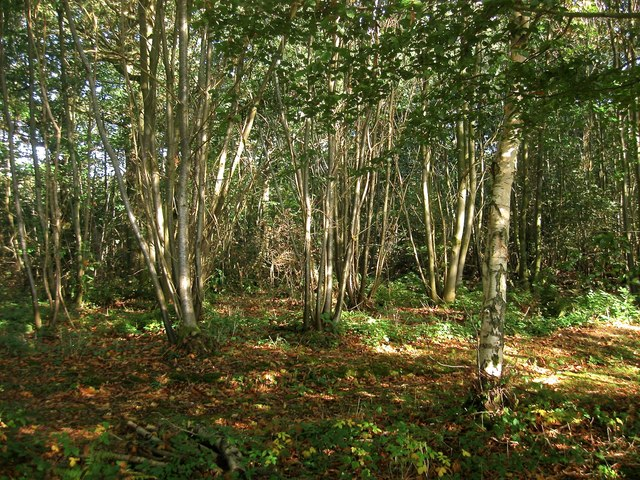
Westup Wood

Deaks Lane is the site of lost Westup Farm (TQ 285 247). it is now just rusty cattle barns, but behind them on the vertical bank is a muscly, bent monster of a tree: an english oak pollard all of 3.5 spans in girth. On the clay bands of these slopes, the old hedges are bright in autumn colours: red, orange and egg yellow Maple, with Spindle, Hazel, Dogwood, Ash and Dog Rose Across the valley southwards is Westup Wood (TQ286 239) with Sessile Oak and Wild Service Tree.

A short distance north again, Deaks Lane bridges a gill stream. On the east side Hook Wood (TQ 287 251), and on the west side Wyllies Wood, have been brutally coniferised, and the dark, bare ground runs right to the water's edge. However, west of Wyllies Wood the gill turns north, with intact ancient woodland, spectacularly steep mini-ravines, waterfalls and tumbled trees (TQ 283 252).

At the top of Deaks Lane, near Henmead, there are big houses with big gates. Along the high watershed ridge tracked by Sloughgreen Lane (between the basins of the Ouse and the Adur) there are only very few surviving fragment of its old moorland vegetation, such as the hidden meadow just south of Pitts Head Crossroads (TQ 268 258). In 2011 it had Devil's bit scabious, Sneezewort and Tormentil although this may have been succeeded.

=== Broxmead Lane ===
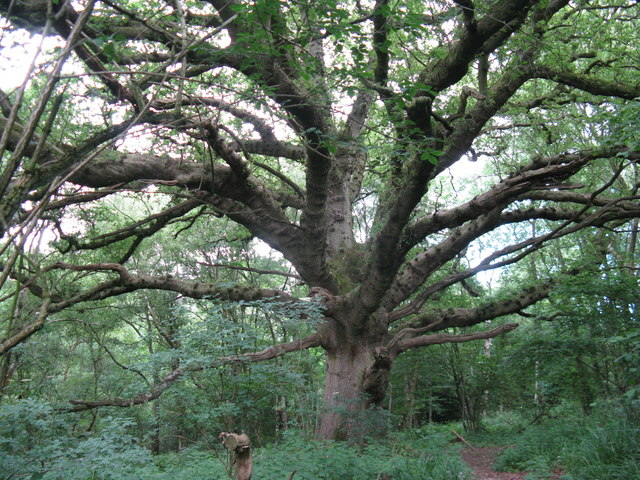
A fine Oak tree in Seven Acre Hanger

Between Broxmead Lane and the London Road, a winding valley is cloaked with the intact ancient woodland of The Hanger, e.g. TQ 272 249: a place of English Oak, Ash, Birch and Gean, over abundant old coppice Hazel. For nearly a mile its shady gill stream, with big fleshy liverworts, runs through this wood. New woods have been added to it in places, such as where Little Thorndean Farm once stood (TQ 273 251), now marked only by a little quarry: a hollow where the well once was, the remains of an outgrown Ash hedge and a wonderful Oak pollard in blooming health, with the broadest sheltering canopy. There are flint flakes and broken microliths in the ploughland adjacent.

On the west side of the gill stream a landslip (TQ 272 245) recently brought Wadhurst Clay and sandstone crashing into The Hanger, splintering trees into an impenetrable tangle. The little Merryfields valley north of Broxmead Lane, has a cluster of three archaic grasslands, two on the south side of the stream and one on the north. The pasture that the footpath descends from the Lane (TQ275 241), was ploughed as recently as thirty years ago, but now has much Adders tongue fern, with Common Spotted Orchid. To its east, a tiny pasture now cared for in the grounds of Merrybrook (TQ 278 241) has Heath Spotted Orchid, Ragged Robin and Devil's bit scabious. There are Stock Doves in tree holes, Grass Snakes, and Bullhead in stream pools.

The best site, though, is an isolated meadow on the north side of the stream (TQ 277 242). On a sunny it can be full of wildlife which can include all the UK Soldierflies including the Green Gem, the Broad Centurion and the Common Orange Legionnaire, as well as the Black Snipefly. There can be butterflies too including Common Blue, Small Copper and Dingy Skipper, damsel flies and lacewings and many birds. It still retains Dyer's Greenweed, Ox-eye daisy, Common Spotted Orchid and Pepper Saxifrage, and Spring Sedge and Zigzag Clover cling on, with Common Valerian down by the stream.

=== East of Handcross: Tanyard and Bantridge Lane ===
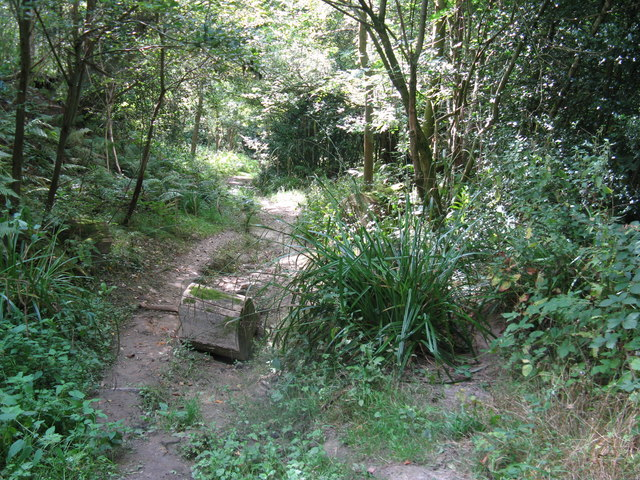
Footpath through Sole's Coppice

To the north of the parish and east of Handcross, to the between Tanyard and Bantridge Lane, Sole's Coppice, TQ 284 292, is a mixture of ancient and secondary woodland, with some fine old Beeches along its western gill slopes. Ditton Place was once a mansion and then was then converted to an Inner London Education Authority special school. It is now part of a new residential complex.

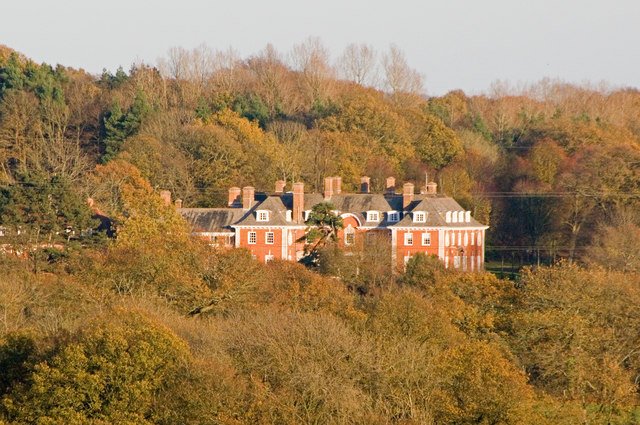
Ditton Place

To the north west, towards Nymans gardens National Trust is a collection of woods. Two footpaths descend from Handcross eastwards into theses deep woods that run continuously for 1.3 miles to Brantridge Lane: Cow Wood and Harry's Wood (both SSSI's around TQ 269 302), and Blackfold and Dencombe Woods (just out of the parish). There are a scatter of fine veteran Oak and Beech, both standing and fallen. Along its higher contours it is an Oak-Hazel wood with some Beech. Ash joins in lower down over the outcropping Grinstead Clay. There are English and Sessile Oak coppice, and some part-controlled Rhodi infestation. Cow Wood's has a 'Redwood Avenue', down in the main Nymans valley, is long and lovely, with alternating Wellingtonias, Coastal Redwood, and Spruce. There are lots of patches of Wild Daffodils in the gullies and valley sides, (TQ 267 296).

There is a low outcrop of Ardingly Sandstone rocks along the south side of the valley. In the 1990s mats of Tunbridge Filmy Fern, Hymenophyllum tunbrigense, with its translucent, one-cell-thick fronds were there as a result of the humid microclimate of this valley that existed for about 5000 years. It is gone, now - stolen en masse in November 2011.

The valley stream debouches into the pond of the vanished Tudor Blackfold iron furnace with shaded mossy banks, (TQ 274 294). The furnace made pig iron for transportation to the forge at Holmsted, 1.75 miles to the south. Blackfold wood and valley lie just north east, (TQ 279 302). They are tranquil and remote, with a deep gill, dense plantation Larch and Norwegian Spruce over the lower slopes, but good Oaks, old Sweet Chestnut coppice and Bracken further up. (Now part-sold off as fragments, 2017).

There used to be a farm on the plateau (TQ 270 301). It is long gone, but a fine three span Oak pollard survives on the farmstead site. Blackfold was a medieval swine pasture of Saddlescombe, 11.5 miles due south behind Newtimber Hill, on the Downs. Strange to think that such a tiny hamlet could once command such remote woodlands.

To the north, just out of the parish is High Beeches Gardens (TQ 276 307).

=== Borde Hill Estate and the centre ===
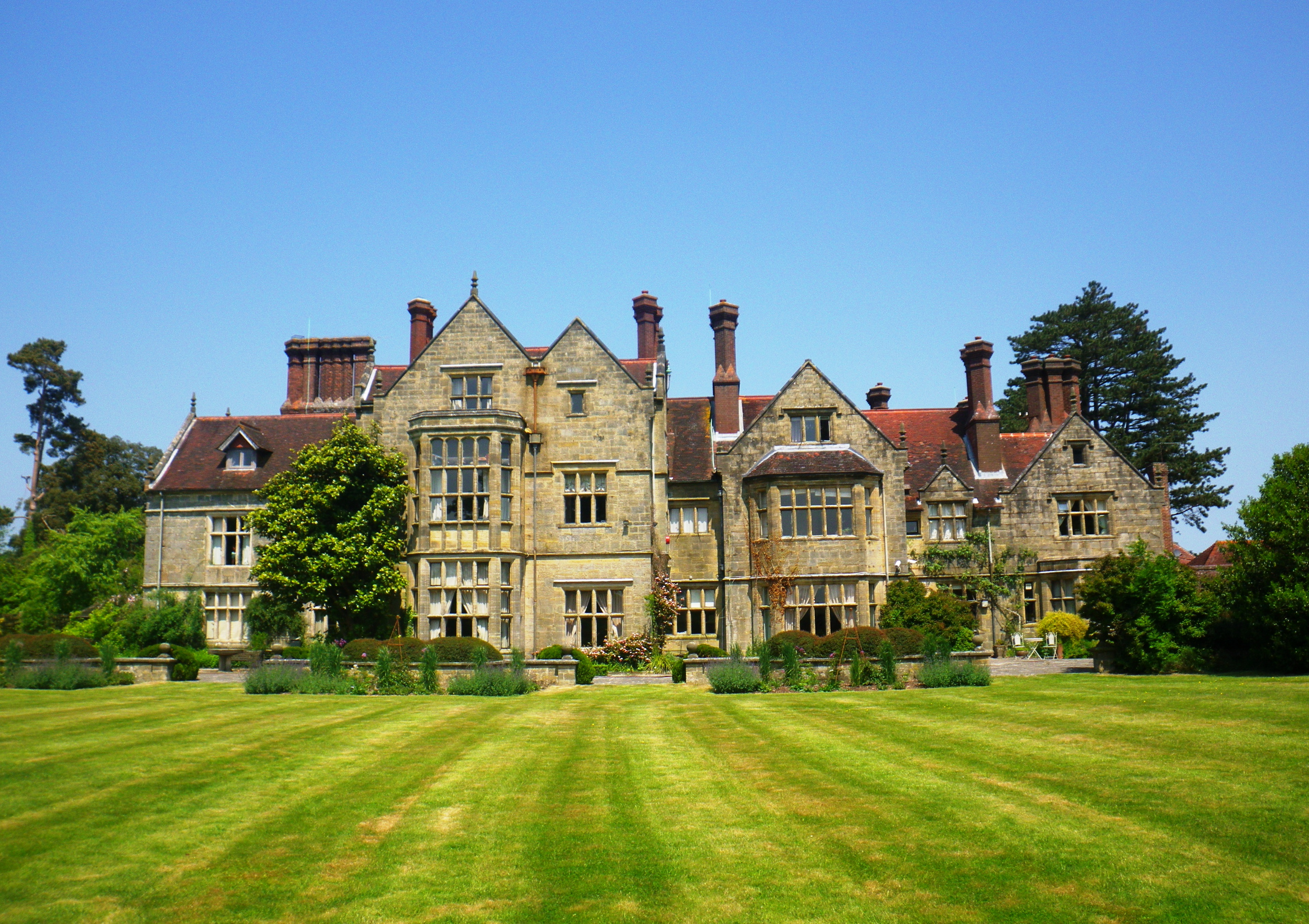
Borde Hill Place

Borde Hill Estate is around 2,300 acres (9.3 km^{2}). The Estate is made up of four let farms as well as areas of land which are farmed by the Estate in conjunction with a local contractor. The vast majority of the Estate sits within the High Weald Area of Outstanding Natural Beauty and is also subject to agricultural, environmental and woodland schemes. Despite this mosaic of farmed and wooded land, there are quite large areas free of public motor roads. However, the amount of public footpaths and green lanes are also limited. The Stephenson Clarkes who own it made their fortune as shipping magnates. The wet clay woods to the north-west (TQ 314 270) have many pheasants for shoots. The Estate sold the land for the Penland Farm development on the edge of Haywards Heath. Their relatives have an estate at Cinder Hill, Horsted Keynes, which used to centre on Broadhurst Manor before that was separately sold.

=== Staplefield Road, Sloughgreen Lane and surrounding area ===
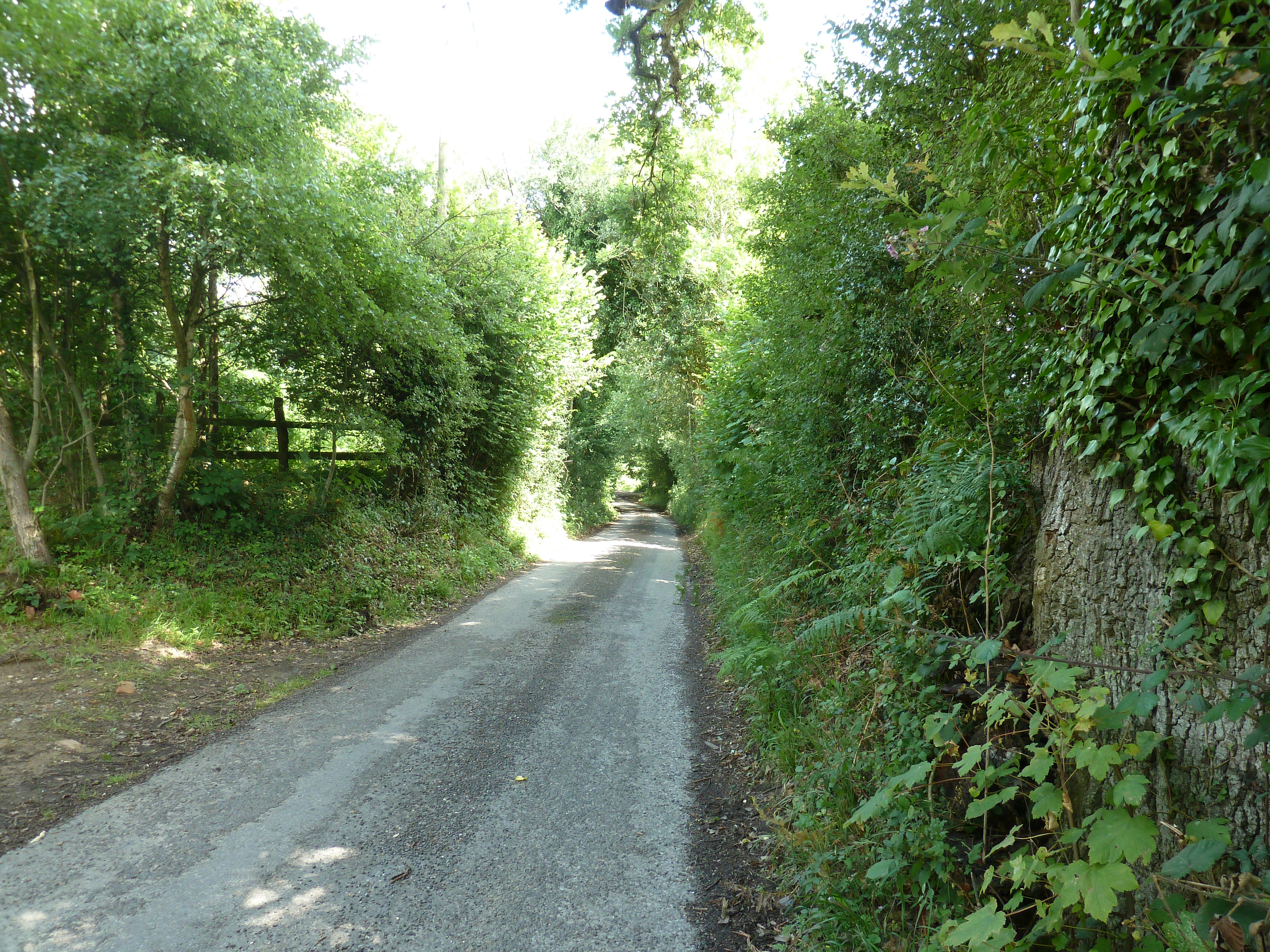
Cleaver's Lane near Whitemans Green

An ancient ridge top route tracks westwards from Whiteman's Green, marking the watershed between the Ouse, to the north, and the Adur, to the south. It takes several names as it goes west: Staplefield Road, Sloughgreen Lane, and then to the west of the parish, Cuckfield Lane and Warninglid Lane.

North of Staplefield Road is a roadless vale of small woods, little farms, and low wooded ridges (with Toll Shaw, Hammerhill Copse and Bigge's Farm upon them). Much of it is part of the Borde Hill estate. The woodland is heavily pitted, and many of the pits are now ponds, but it was Horsham Stone they were digging, not iron ore. On the underside of upturned root plates and along some paths there are large pieces of Horsham slabstone.

The low ridges are capped with hard Horsham Stone strata within the sunken wedge of Wealden Clay which is the central feature of the rift valley. The Wealden Clay outcrops between Sidnye Farm and Mizbrooks Farm - well-named (it means 'moss brook') because there are a series of springs eastwards from there along Spark's Lane (as in the wood at TQ 297 269) marking the transition from the sandstone to the clay below. It is an 'Oak countryside'. The old hedges are well managed and the tracks hard surfaced. The farmed land means that there is an absence of archaic grassland sites.

Sidnye Farm, TQ 295 277, is a Borde Hill tenancy. The name, like Ryelands, includes the old river name 'ea'. Bigge's Farm, TQ 290 271, is 15th century, with a timber frame, and nearby Cleaver's Farm and Mizbrooks are 17th century or earlier, and timber framed.

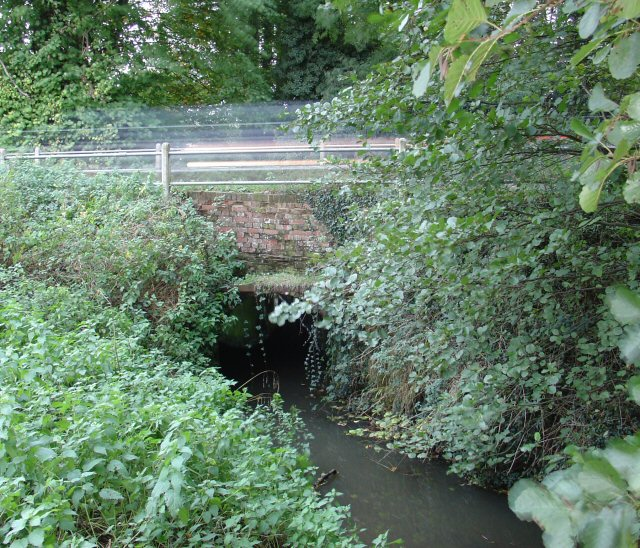
Hammerhill Bridge, over the River Ouse, South of Staplefield, West Sussex

Holmstead Farm has been damaged by agribusiness and the noise from the A23 is relentless. Further downslope the ancient Holmsted Wood, which remained intact until the 1970s, is now all gone and its site used for landfill, now grassed over. Holmsted and Hammerhill Farm took their names from the Holmsted Hammer Forge, which worked until c. 1660. It took its pig iron from Blackfold and Slaugham Furnace, and from Tilgate, too. The pond bay lay just west of the Ouse bridge (TQ 281 273). It was largely removed by the County Council in 1928 to use as 'fill' for road works, though a section of it survives.

North of Sloughgreen Lane there are still areas of the greatest charm. The woods around Beacon Hall, TQ 274 262, have some fine old Beeches, perhaps outgrown coppice, and there's Sweet Chestnut coppice east of Mallion's Lane bordering Sloughgreen Lane's north side.

=== Mallion's Lane ===
Mallion's Lane TQ 276 264 is almost car-free, and winds downhill with colourful flowery verges on both sides. 73 herbs and grasses have been counted there and there are Orchids, Betony, and Zigzag Clover amongst much Upright Hedge Parsley, Hogweed and Knapweed. There are many damp-loving species, like Great Willowherb, Fleabane, Marsh Bedstraw, Yellow Loosestrife and False Fox Sedge. Particularly uphill, there are many woodland species that are refugees from the lost Holmsted Wood - Bluebells, Goldenrod and Wood Melic. Whitehouse Farm, TQ 270 262, is Tudor and timber framed, and next to it is a tiny archaic farm meadow that has good displays of Spotted Orchids (2011).
