= Holy Trinity Church, Cuckfield =

Church in West Sussex, England

Holy Trinity Church
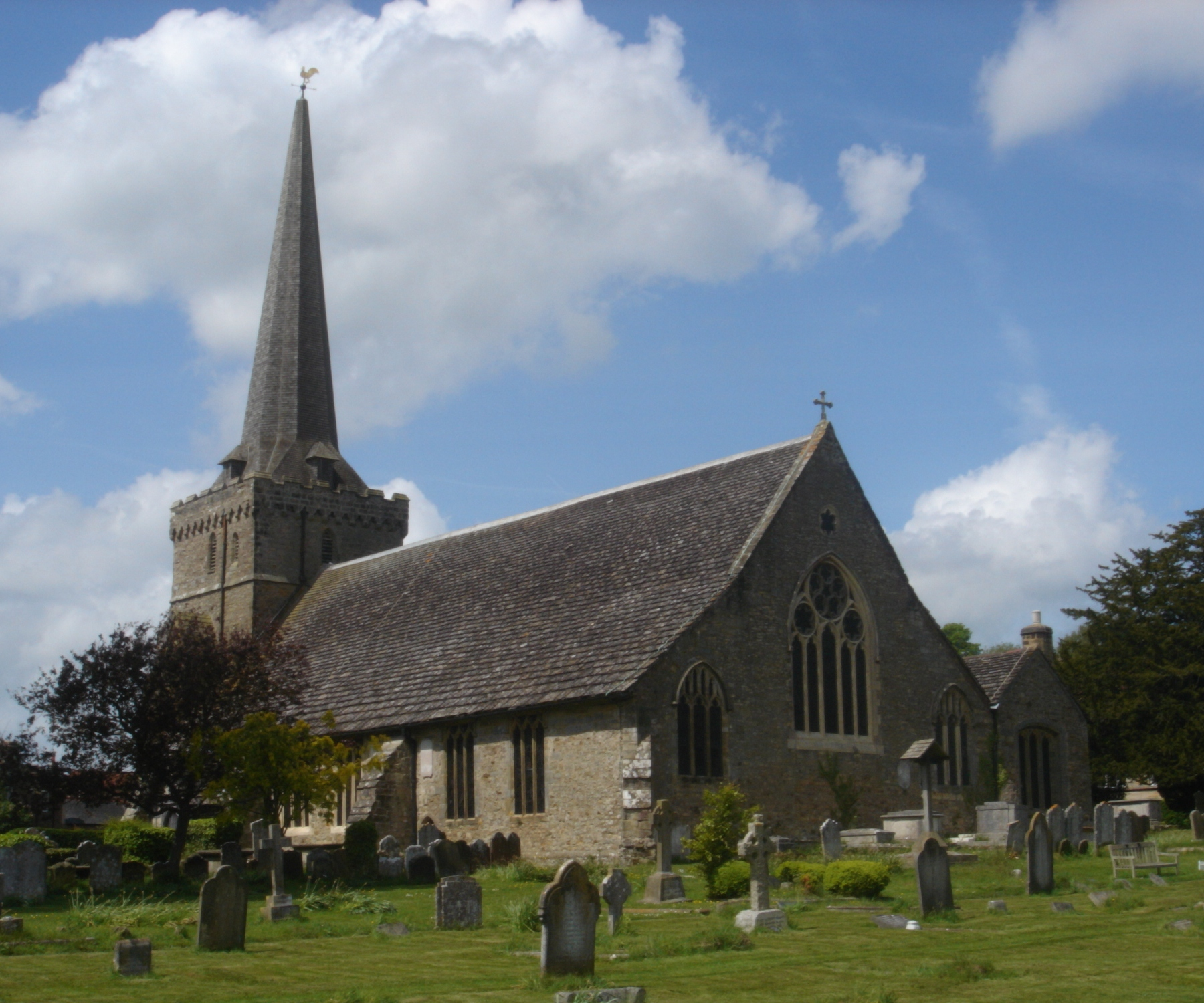
- The church from the southeast
- Holy Trinity Church
- 51.0049°N 0.1434°W
- Location: Church Platt, Cuckfield, West Sussex RH17 5JZ
- Country: England
- Denomination: Church of England
- Website: www.holytrinitycuckfield.org

History
- Status: Parish church
- Founded: 11th century
- Founder: Possibly William de Warenne, 1st Earl of Surrey
- Dedication: Holy Trinity

Architecture
- Functional status: Active
- Heritage designation: Grade I
- Designated: 10 September 1951
- Style: English Gothic

Administration
- Province: Canterbury
- Diocese: Chichester
- Archdeaconry: Horsham
- Deanery: Rural Deanery of Cuckfield
- Parish: Cuckfield

Clergy
- Vicar: Revd Daniel Valentine

Holy Trinity Church is an Anglican church in the village of Cuckfield in the district of Mid Sussex; one of seven local government districts in the English county of West Sussex. It was founded in the 11th century and was in the possession of Lewes Priory by 1090. The present structure dates from the mid-13th century but was extended in the 14th century and heavily altered and restored during the Victorian period, with much interior work by Charles Eamer Kempe and stained glass by both Kempe and the Clayton and Bell firm. The church's spire was replaced in 1981 following a fire. Former chapels of ease in outlying hamlets have closed, and the church now serves a large rural area in the centre of Sussex. It is protected as a Grade I listed building.

== History ==
From his base at the episcopal see of Selsey, which he founded, the 7th-century bishop Wilfrid converted many of the pagan inhabitants of the Kingdom of the South Saxons (present-day Sussex) to Christianity. Primitive wooden or wattle and daub churches were built throughout the kingdom, especially in forest clearings. The village of Cuckfield is thought to have been founded at one such clearing in the dense forest of Andredesweald, which covered much of the north of Sussex; so a church may have existed in the village from about the 8th century, when Wilfrid's mission penetrated that part of the kingdom.

A church was not recorded in the Domesday Book of 1086. The first documented evidence for a settlement and church at Cuckfield came c.1090, when the church was in the possession of Lewes Priory, England's first Cluniac house. The reported date of this record varies, but William de Warenne, 1st Earl of Surrey is consistently recording as holding the church. He died in 1088, so dates of 1090, 1091 or 1092 reported in some sources may not be correct. The influence of de Warenne and his wife Gundred on the Cuckfield area extended beyond passive ownership: having founded Lewes Priory, they built and lived in Lewes Castle and established a hunting lodge on land at Cuckfield. They may also have built the church itself, rather than merely taking possession of it on behalf of their priory. (Cuckfield is about 14 miles (23 km) northwest of Lewes, and was in the Rape of Lewes: one of the six pre-Norman subdivisions of Sussex.) The exact date of the church's founding is not known: although it was not recorded in the Domesday Book of 1086, details of churches were only recorded haphazardly in that survey, and many pre-1086 churches in Sussex are missing from it.

In 1091, de Warenne's son William de Warenne, 2nd Earl of Surrey reaffirmed the grant of the church, the buildings in the village and all its tithes to the priory. A copy of this charter is held in the British Museum in London. Records of further confirmation of this arrangement survive from the 1120s (from Ralph de Luffa, Bishop of Chichester ) and the end of the 12th century (by Hamelin de Warenne, Earl of Surrey).

The Norman-era building, which had existed in the late 11th century, was probably a simple two-cell structure with nave and chancel. It was rebuilt in about 1250, when the Bishop of Chichester Richard de la Wych (later canonised) made an agreement with Lewes Priory to endow a vicarage and improve the church. At that stage, the priory controlled 39 churches in Sussex. He appointed his chaplain Walter de Warnecamp as the church's first parish priest, and put him in charge of the enlargement. The south wall of the Norman chapel was demolished and a three-bay aisle was built in its place, reached through three archways with round columns. The tower at the west end was also started, although it may have reached its full height only in the mid-14th century. The chancel may have been reconfigured as well.

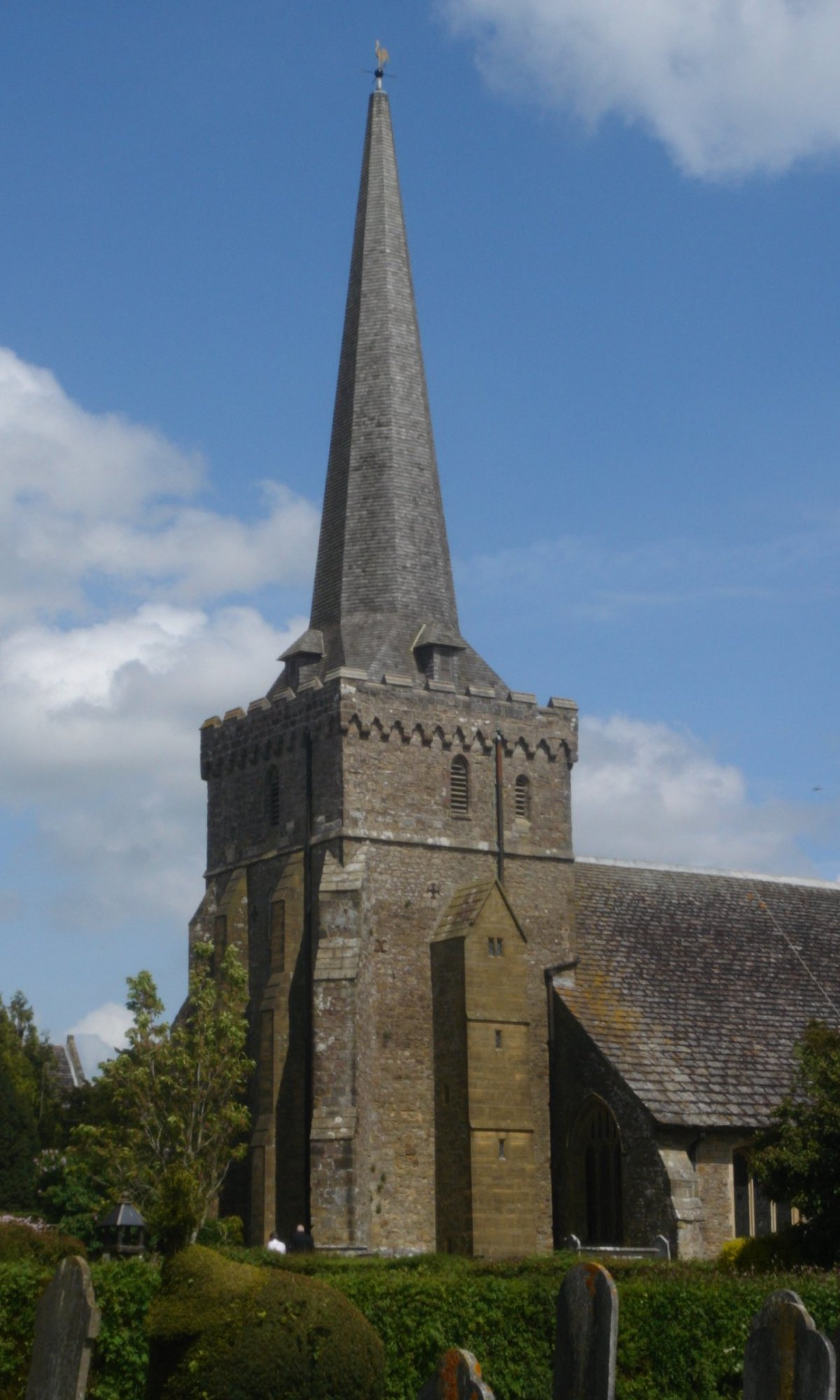
The heavily buttressed tower and broach spire

The church had acquired its much of its present structural form by about 1340 after a decade of rebuilding and enlargement. Another bay was added at the east end of the nave; arcaded chapels were added to the north and south of the chancel and aligned with the walls of the nave aisles; the height of the nave was increased by the addition of a clerestory below the roofline; and the tower was extended to its present height with a belfry. The south aisle of the nave was extended to four bays to match the newly enlarged nave, and another was added on the north side for balance. This was supported on hexagonal piers. Several windows with flat headers and ogee-arched lights also date from this era, and the slim, tall spire is believed to be contemporary as well. It is slightly recessed within the castellated parapet of the tower, and is of the broach spire type.

The external roofline was changed in the late 15th century: the walls of the aisles were built up, and the roof was brought down in a single sweep from the ridge to the eaves. This work, which had the effect of blocking the quatrefoil windows in the clerestory, was done in conjunction with the installation of a wagon vault ceiling with tie-beams and spandrels. This substantial oak roof has carved bosses and elaborate moulding on its beams. Further enlargement came in the following century, reflecting Cuckfield's steadily increasing prosperity: a chapel was added at the northeast corner for the use of the locally important Sergison family.

The English Reformation of the 16th century, through which Protestantism became established and Catholic-style worship and practices were banished, affected Holy Trinity Church in the same ways as other churches: statues, icons and paintings were removed or destroyed, the internal layout was simplified, Holy Communion rituals were altered, English was used instead of Latin, and objects ranging from hymn-books to the altar had to be stripped out and destroyed in public—often by being burnt. Inventories had to be provided to prove this had been done, and a surviving document produced by Cuckfield's churchwarden in 1620 shows that hardly any objects were then used during services. More disruption came during the English Civil War starting in 1641: Rev. Dr James Marsh, appointed vicar of Cuckfield in 1638, had Royalist sympathies and became one of the thousands of clergymen who were removed from their parishes and had their possessions sequestered. He was sent to prison three times during the war. Although central Sussex escaped the worst of the fighting, Parliamentarians are known to have damaged the church: soldiers broke the stoups, and a large crack in the 13th-century font was reputedly caused by a kick from one of their horses stabled inside the church.

The Restoration of the Monarchy in 1660 ended this turbulent period, and more structural work was soon carried out on the church: the spire was shingled and a clock was installed in the tower in 1667. Some minor work had also been carried out in the 1630s: altar rails were installed in 1637, the building was painted, a gallery was added inside and the vicar hung the church's first ring of bells. The weight of the roof necessitated external buttressing of the south aisle at this time as well. The church's present eight bells were cast by Thomas Mears II of the Whitechapel Bell Foundry in 1815.

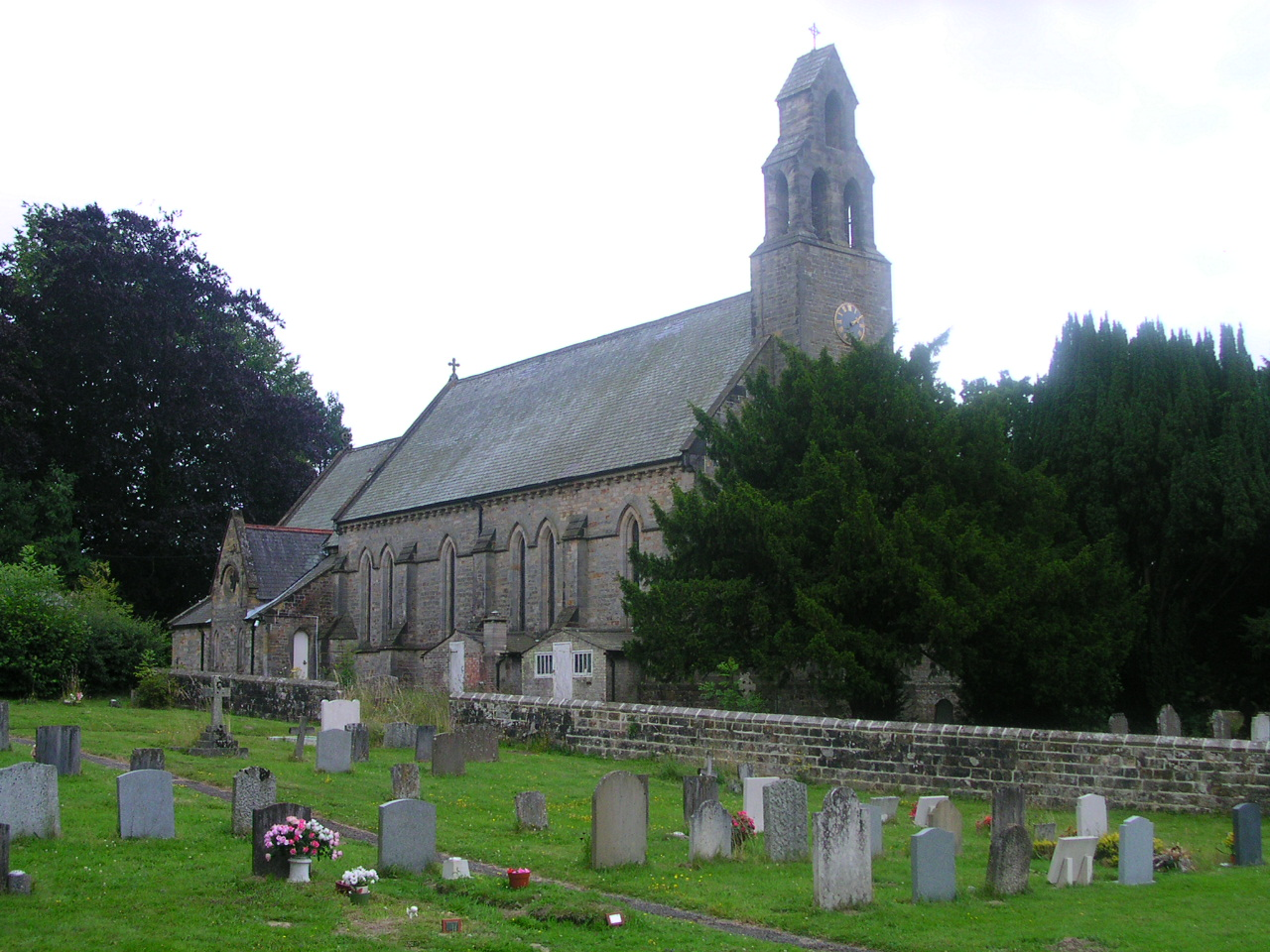
St Mark's Church, Staplefield—formerly part of Holy Trinity's parish

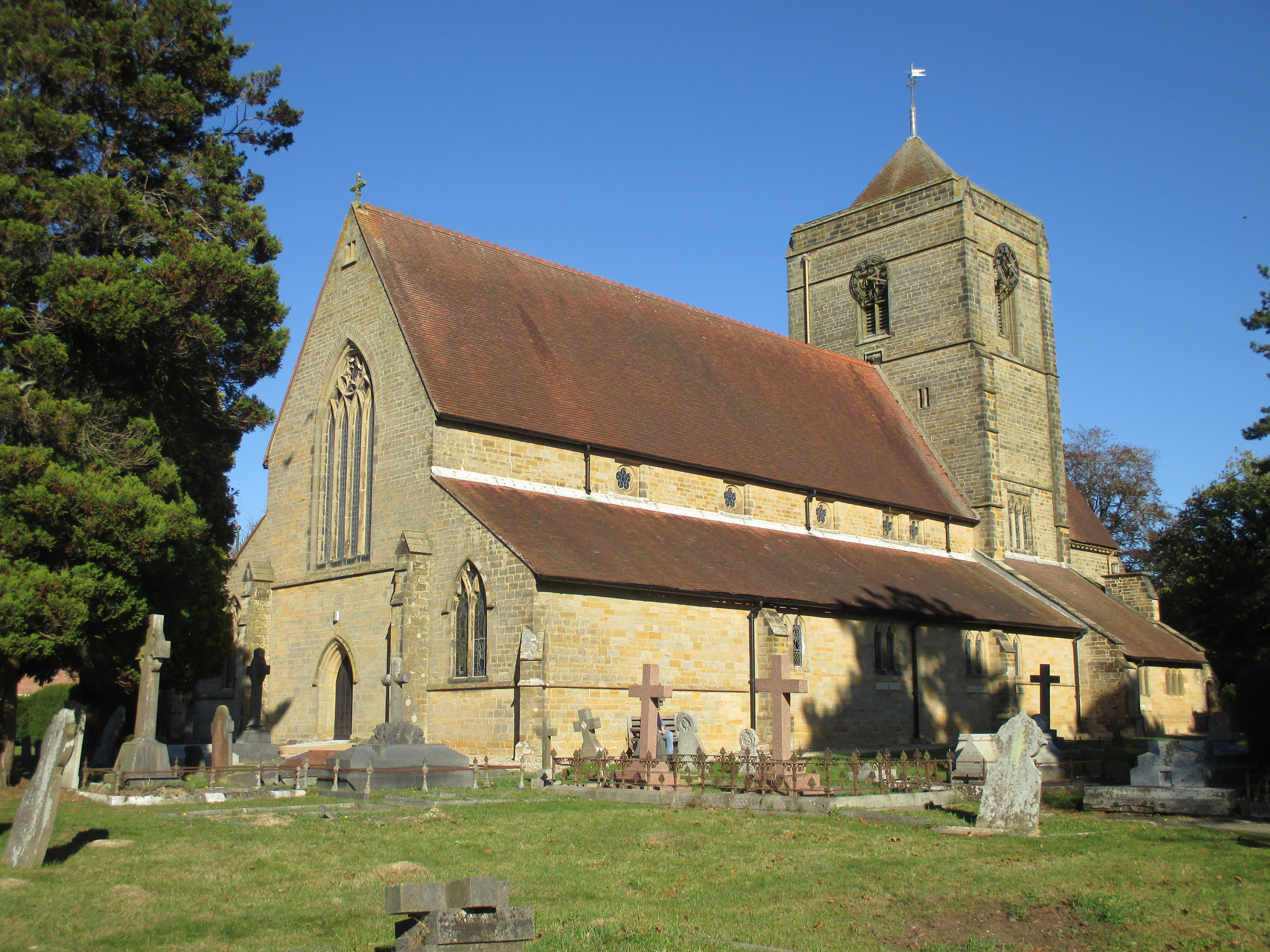
St Wilfrid's Church, Haywards Heath—formerly part of Holy Trinity's parish

In the 19th century, Cuckfield parish was split, with two new parishes created: in 1848, a year after Benjamin Ferrey built St Mark's Church at Staplefield (paid for by the vicar and parishioners of Holy Trinity Church), it was given its own parish to serve the village, and in 1865 Haywards Heath was given its own ecclesiastical parish based at George Frederick Bodley's St Wilfrid's Church, completed that year. The rapidly growing town only came into existence after Cuckfield villagers and the church authorities refused to allow the London to Brighton railway line to be built through the village: its planned alignment took it past the east side of the churchyard, but the London and Brighton Railway company moved it 1.5 miles (2.4 km) to the east across the unpopulated heathland after which residents gave their approval.

The most wide-ranging structural changes in the building's history took place in the mid-19th century. These were planned by Rev. Thomas Astley Maberly, incumbent for 36 years from 1841, and his curate (and successor as vicar) James Cooper, who joined the parish in 1855. Cooper was a former member of the Ecclesiastical and Architectural Society. In 1839, an unnamed parishioner donated a barrel organ to the church, but its range of music was deemed inadequate. The same parishioner presented a new organ in 1842, which was well received by all and immediately changed the character of worship at the church, which had previously relied on a choir for musical accompaniment. The old font was also restored and repositioned in the church, apparently after being discovered in pieces in the belfry by the vicar. In 1846, a baptistery was formed in one end of the south aisle, some of the windows were reglazed (some with stained glass), a tiled floor was laid and new oak pews were installed.

In 1855, Rev. Maberly commissioned George Frederick Bodley to renovate the church. The comprehensive reconfiguration and rebuilding carried out by him and his pupil Charles Eamer Kempe has given the building a largely Victorian appearance. Changes were made in all parts of the church: Bodley installed marble steps and railings in the chancel, raised the floor height in the chancel, installed a new reredos of alabaster (no longer in place), changed the 17th-century triple-deck timber pulpit for a new, smaller version of stone and wood, put in new choir stalls, removed the galleries, opened out one of the arcades in the south aisle which had been partitioned previously, renewed all the floors, lowered the floor in the tower to bring it in line with the rest of the church, re-roofed the south aisle and installed three new windows and removed a chandelier, which was donated to a church in Oxford. More work took place in 1862–63: the vestry was removed from the east end of the south aisle and a Lady chapel took its place; in 1888 the former Sergison chapel was converted into a new vestry. The large east window, designed in 1330 in the Perpendicular style, was replaced by a shorter replica.

Charles Eamer Kempe's association with the church began in 1865, when Bodley commissioned him to paint the wagon vault ceiling, which was still in its unadorned 15th-century state. His work, mostly floral designs in pale colours, is considered to be excellent and well-suited to the shape of the roof. He also designed and installed several stained glass windows between 1875 and 1887, for example in the north aisle and west wall, and rebuilt the south porch in 1883 using most of the original stonework. Five years earlier, one had been added on the north side by Richard Herbert Carpenter. In the 1870s, the belfry was repanelled and given a new ceiling, the 25,000 shingles on the spire were replaced, a new staircase was built into the belfry and a new clock was installed. The clock of 1667 was saved and installed on the inside wall of the tower.

A war memorial was built in the churchyard and dedicated in 1921. During this work, a 13th-century coin was found in the ground; it was minted at the time the church was being built, and may have been dropped then. A memorial tablet of white marble, listing the names of all Cuckfield residents killed in the First World War, was installed inside the church in 1922. In the same year, repairs were found to be needed to several parts of the building and its fixtures; the Diocese of Chichester provided funds to supplement the offertory, and work started immediately. Repairs to the roof led to the uncovering of the blocked clerestory windows and two others in the chancel, although they were bricked up again in 1933. The tower was being undermined by ivy growth, and its stonework was repaired in 1925.

Problems afflicted the spire and tower throughout the 20th century. A fire at Easter 1917 was quickly dealt with, but another caused by a lightning strike in July 1945 caused major damage, especially to the bells and the woodwork inside. Six of the eight bells were disabled for 14 months. In 1972, the shingles on the spire were found to need replacement again, and a death watch beetle infestation was found. The weather vane was also found to be dangerous and had to be removed temporarily. Repairs were carried out, but on 1 May 1980 another fire broke out; it was so severe that the spire toppled from the tower after just 15 minutes. A replica was made in two parts at Littlehampton and reassembled on top of the tower in February 1981; the only change, insisted on by the church's insurers, was the insertion of larger louvres to provide easier access from the top of the tower to the spire.

== Architecture ==
Holy Trinity Church is Gothic in style, combining elements of the Early English and Decorated styles. The plan consists of a chancel with chapels to the north and south, a four-bay nave with aisles to the north and south and porches on each side (approximately level with the second bay from the west end), a west tower with a staircase on the south side, and a vestry (the former Sergison chapel) attached to the north chapel. It is built entirely of Sussex sandstone, some of which may have been quarried in Cuckfield itself. The roofs are covered with slabs of Horsham stone. The former Sergison chapel has external chamfering and ashlar dressings to its walls.

Most of the windows have stained glass, by either Charles Eamer Kempe or the Clayton and Bell firm. The latter was active throughout Sussex in the late 19th century, and its work features in many churches. A Kempe window, featuring Michael the Archangel, was installed in the west wall of the tower in 1875; he added a Jesse window in the north aisle in 1887 and another, known as 'The Redemption' next to it in 1889. At least four windows in the church have been attributed to him. Clayton and Bell's work, dated 1869 and 1879, is in the south aisle as well as similar dated Clayton and Bell windows in the north aisle.

== Churchyard ==
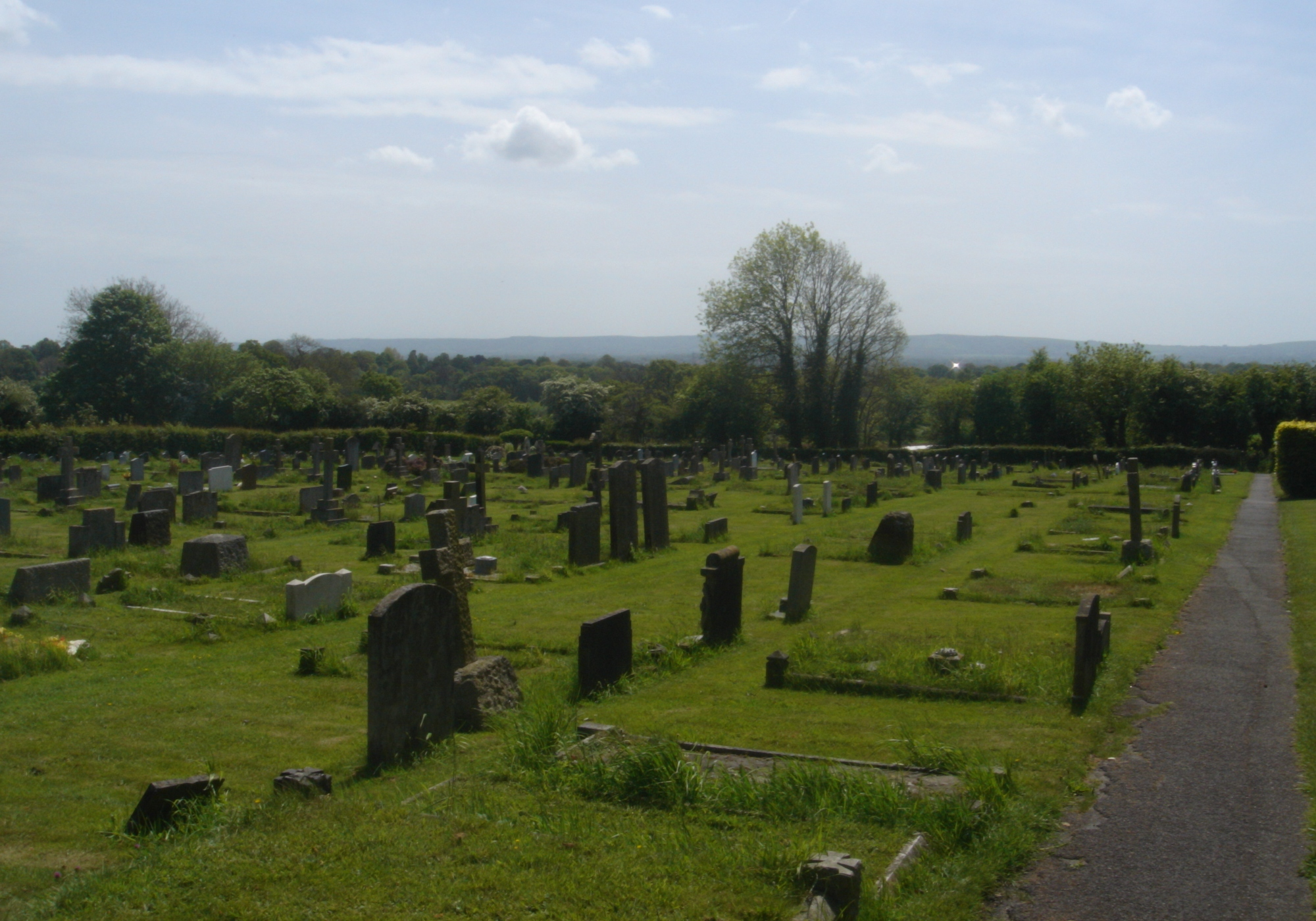
Southward view across the churchyard

The churchyard has far-reaching southward views to the South Downs. There are many 17th- and 18th-century gravestones, 22 of which are individually protected with Grade II listing. Elsewhere, a rare 19th-century wooden grave marker has been restored to its original condition. An extremely tall, old tree is a dominant feature. The churchyard is entered through two lychgates, both of which are also Grade II listed. One was designed by Charles Eamer Kempe in either 1887 or 1893; the structure is entirely of timber, supporting a "pagoda-shaped" of Horsham stone tiles topped with an iron cross. There are two arches of unequal width, the wider of which is gated. The gate is dedicated to a parishioner, Caroline Emily Maberley. The other was added in 1911 and stands on a base of sandstone. The roof is laid with Horsham stone tiles. The walls alongside the gate, of sandstone ashlar, are included in the listing. The gate also bears a dedication to a parishioner, Laura Maria Bevan, the wife of Richard Alexander Bevan ("the father of Cuckfield"). The existence of a pair of lychgates at a churchyard is rare.

Enlargement took place in 1855 to accommodate burials from the growing railway town of Haywards Heath, which at that time was still in Holy Trinity's parish. By this time, the churchyard had become a cemetery and was no longer run by the church authorities. More land was acquired for expansion in the 20th century.

== Vicarage ==
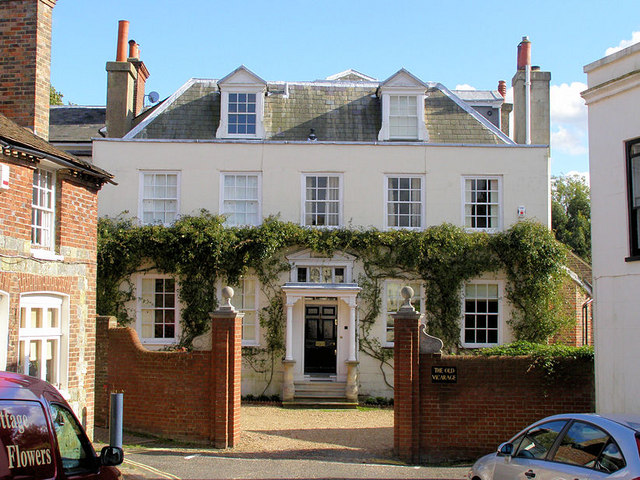
The former vicarage

The old vicarage, which had been rebuilt in Georgian style in the 1780s, was found to be in poor condition in 1926. Several surrounding farm buildings and a tithe barn were demolished and the vicarage itself was sold in 1937. The vicar lived in a Victorian house near the church until 1945, when another house was bought nearby. This in turn fell into disrepair by 1961, but money was raised for repairs.

The old vicarage is now a Grade II listed building. Originally built in the early 17th century, it was comprehensively redesigned and rebuilt between October 1780 and September 1781. Alterations were made in the 19th century. The stuccoed façade has five bays, each with an evenly spaced sash window topped by an architrave with decorative moulding. The door is set below a pediment and fanlight which is obscured by a hood-moulded porch projecting forwards over the steps. The southeast-facing side has a tall 19th-century bow window. Another wing was added to the north in the mid-19th century at the request of Rev. Maberley.

== The church today ==
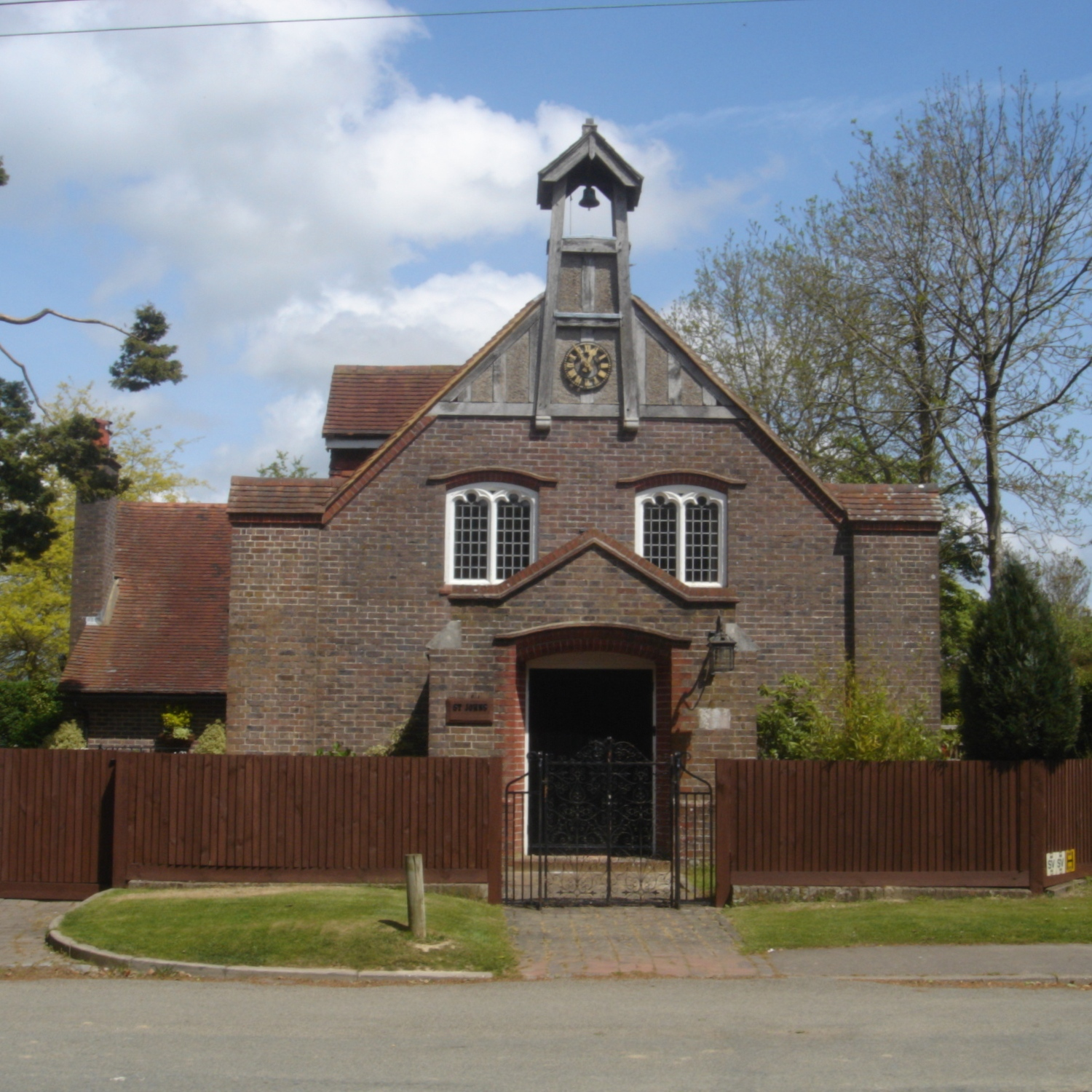
St John's Chapel at Ansty

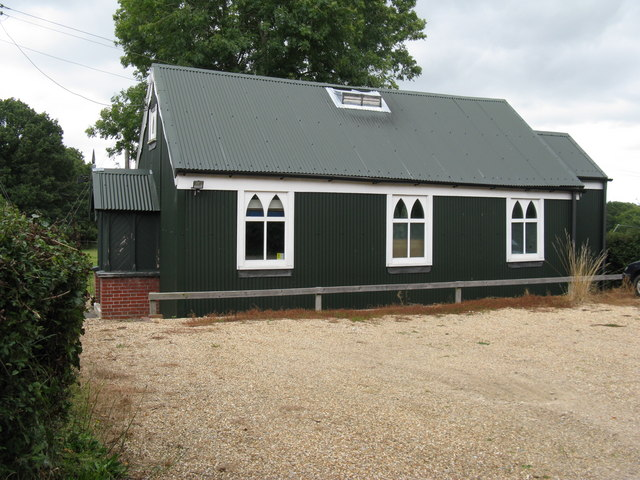
All Saints at Brook Street

Holy Trinity Church was designated a Grade I listed building on 10 September 1951.

The church, standing on the south edge of Cuckfield off the High Street and with long views across the Weald, is "the focal point of the village", despite the site being the lowest land in the area (305 feet (93 m) above sea level).

The parish covers a mostly rural area in Mid Sussex. The only settlements are Cuckfield itself and the nearby hamlets of Ansty and Brook Street. Both formerly had chapels of ease of their own. The chapel at Brook Street was dedicated to All Saints and was served by Holy Trinity's curates and their assistants. It was opened in 1879 by the vicar of Holy Trinity Church, Rev. Francis Mount. Services continued to be held there until November 1968, by which time the structure had become unsafe and congregations were declining. The building now houses a picture-framing shop. At Ansty, also in 1879, Rev. Mount opened a tin tabernacle. This was enlarged with a proper chancel in 1883, and on 10 December 1909 it reopened in a new, brick-built form as St John's Chapel after being rebuilt and rededicated as a memorial to a local resident. Thoughts of closing the church first arose in 1998, when finding enough clergy and laypeople to run it effectively started to become very difficult, and in January 1999 the proposal was put to worshipers and local residents. Combining its spiritual functions with those of a community centre were considered, but the outcome was the closure and sale of the chapel. The last service took place at Christmas 2000, and the building was converted into a house.

== See also ==
- Grade I listed buildings in West Sussex
- List of places of worship in Mid Sussex
