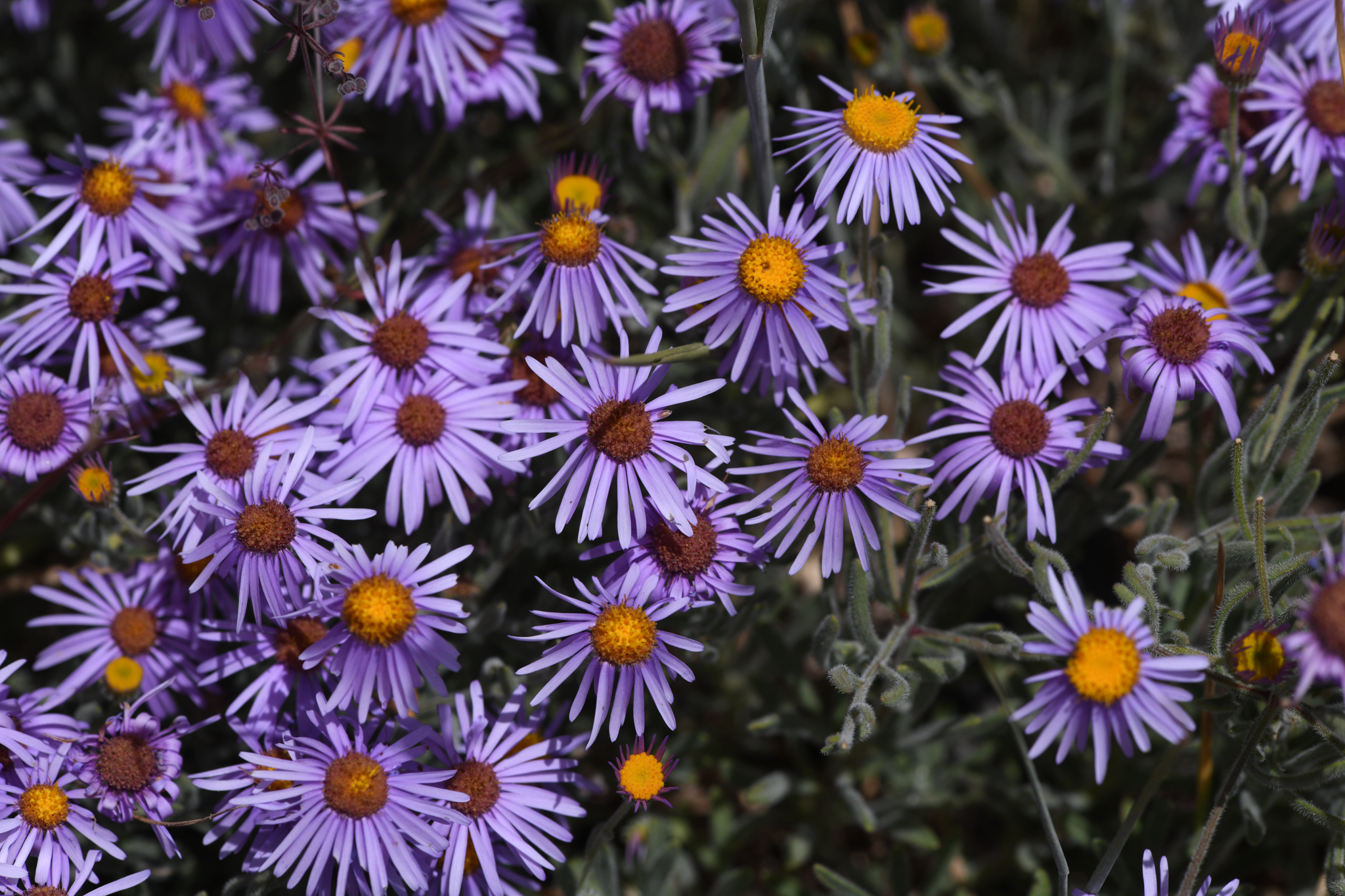

Scientific classification
- Kingdom: Plantae
- Clade: Tracheophytes
- Clade: Angiosperms
- Clade: Eudicots
- Clade: Asterids
- Order: Asterales
- Family: Asteraceae
- Genus: Erigeron
- Species: E. klamathensis

Binomial name
- Erigeron klamathensis (G.L.Nesom) G.L.Nesom

Synonyms
- Erigeron breweri var. klamathensis G.L.Nesom

= Erigeron klamathensis =

Species of flowering plant

Erigeron klamathensis is a North American species of flowering plant in the family Asteraceae known by the common name Klamath fleabane or Klamath daisy. It had been collected by botanists for many years and generally regarded as part of E. foliosus. It was not recognized as a distinct species until 2004.

Erigeron klamathensis is native to the Klamath Ranges of southwestern Oregon and northwestern California. It is a perennial herb up to 20 cm (8 inches) tall, producing a woody taproot. The stem is covered with stiff, straight hairs, unlike some related species. Leaves are most on the stem rather than crowded close to the ground. Each stem can produce 1–5 flower heads, each with as many as 30 purple or lavender ray florets surrounding numerous yellow disc florets.
