= Tyes Place =

Manor house in Sussex, England

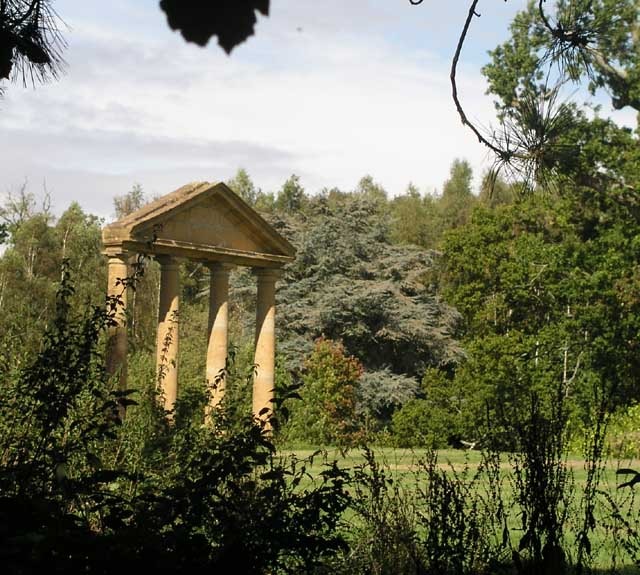
- Folly in the grounds of Tyes Place

- Location within West Sussex
- 51°02′16″N 0°10′02″W
- Location: Staplefield
- OS grid reference: TQ 28603 28071

History
- Built: 17th century

Site notes
- Area: West Sussex
- Architectural style: Timber framed

Listed Building – Grade II
- Official name: Tyes Place
- Designated: 11 May 1983
- Reference no.: 1025731

Tyes Place is a listed historic manor house in Staplefield, West Sussex, England. It was once a farm, then in the first half of the 20th century it was owned by local benefactors Margaret and Stanley Powell, who in 1918 used the building as a rest house for clergy. It is now a private residence.

== Structure ==
Tyes Place is essentially a timber-framed structure which was given a new front in the 18th century. The ground floor at the front is of red brick and grey headers, and the upper floor at the front is tile-hung as per the local Sussex vernacular. It has casement windows downstairs, and original sash windows upstairs. The roof is tiled, and has two dormer windows. The dining room fireplace has a Tudor arch and "carved arabesque frieze". (Note: Although Salzman calls the fireplace a "Tudor arch", and the house was begun in the 17th century, this style of fireplace continued to be designed in rural locations throughout the 17th century, e.g. by Inigo Jones (died 1652))

== History ==
This manor house was constructed as a timber frame building by the seventeenth century or earlier, and remodelled in the eighteenth. The L-shaped building is to the east of the village green. The east wing was built around a medieval hall with an extra floor inserted in the sixteenth century, believed to have been done by William Butler. His daughter, Margaret, married Lawrence Washington, an ancestor of George Washington, in 1588. The house has been listed as Grade II by English Heritage since 11 May 1983.

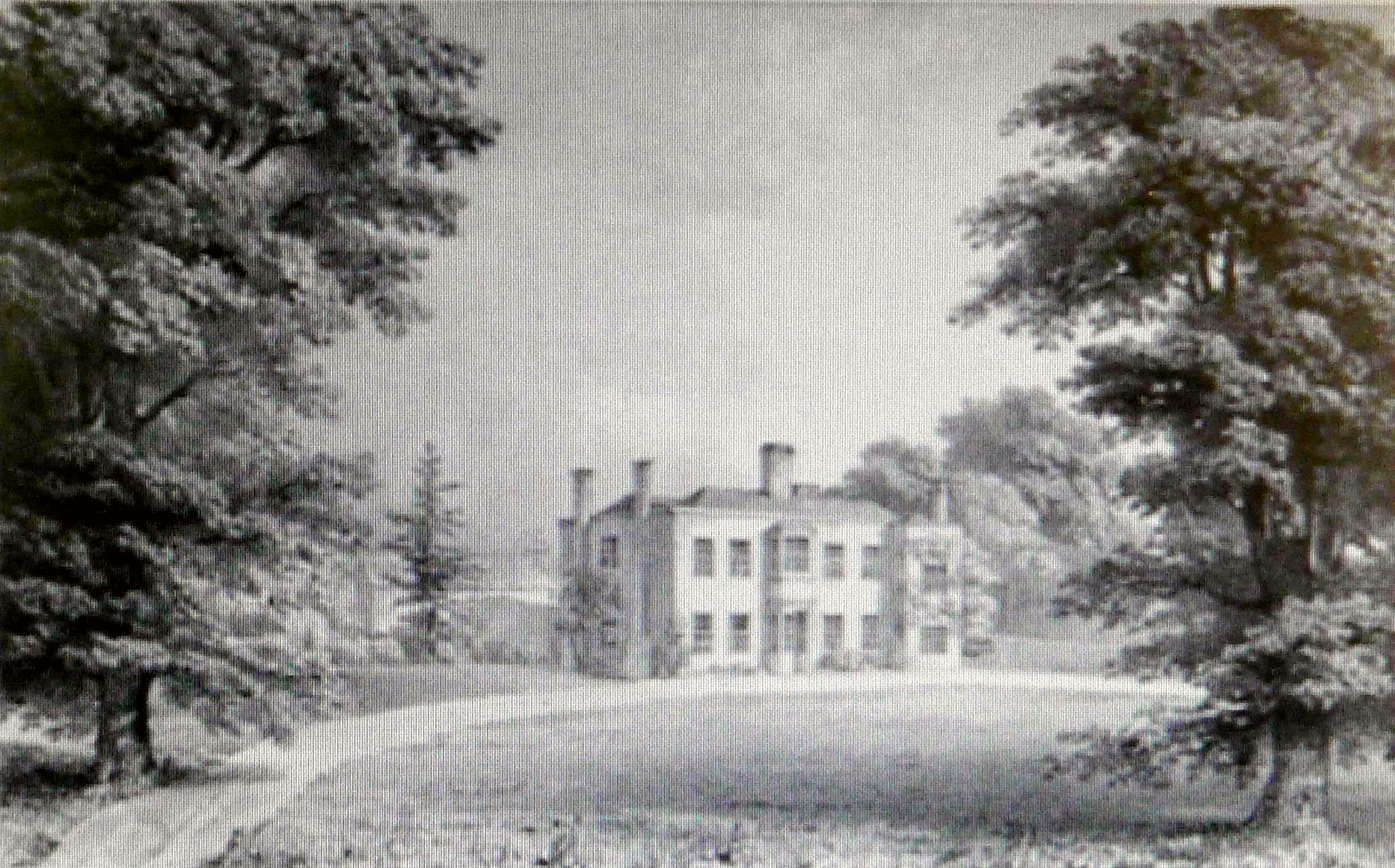
Bridge House, Cuckfield. Tyes Place was part of its estate until 1839

Tyes Place, which had been a freehold manor farm, was once (along with Dorcas and Rowland farms) part of the Bridge House Estate, which was broken up in 1839 after the mansion was taken down. Miss Frances Grainger (d. Sulhamstead 1918) was born at Tyes Place around 1834. She was the daughter of Tyes Place residents Thomas Bannerman Grainger (d. before 1895) and his wife Frances "Fanny" Grainger (d.1839). In 1877 the residents at Tyes Place were G.C. Boutcher and his wife. Another former resident of Tyes Place was Jerome Dennison, an Orkney man, who died there in 1880. Qn 13 October 1892 the farmer of Tyes Place, Mr H. Maye, sold up his farm stock, as he was "declining farming". Maye had "six powerful active cart horses" plus five bay horses, about forty cattle and some pigs, a number of horse-drawn wagons, carts and ploughs, besides other farming implements. In 1895 the resident of Tyes Place was R.C. Gardner, who was reported as a possible suicide by the Mid Sussex Times, he having apparently shot himself.

In 1902 there was a haystack fire at Tyes Place, attended by the fire brigade. Twenty tons of hay was lost. In 1903 the farmer was S.W. Edwards. In 1904 some of the land associated with Tyes Place was sold for building purposes. in 1904 the farmer was Thomas Pavey, who was summonsed for cruelty to a severely emaciated cow, which he caused to be driven five miles. On 30 December 1905 the land attached to Tyes Place was still being used by the local hunt, the Surrey Staghounds, headed by Captain McTaggart. On that day, they chased a female deer which they named Valentine from Moonhill Farm, Ansty, and took her on Tyes' land. In a sale report of 1907 for farmer Scott Pitcher, Tyes Place is described as an "old-fashioned residence", with "four cottages, two sets of farm buildings, gardens, orchard, and about 123 acres (50 ha) of nicely-timbered park-like grassland". One Wednesday in 1911 it was noted by the Mid Sussex Times that the Archbishop of Canterbury motored from Horsted Keynes with his wife to have tea with tenant Mrs Harry Trench at Tyes Place.

=== Margaret and Stanley Powell ===
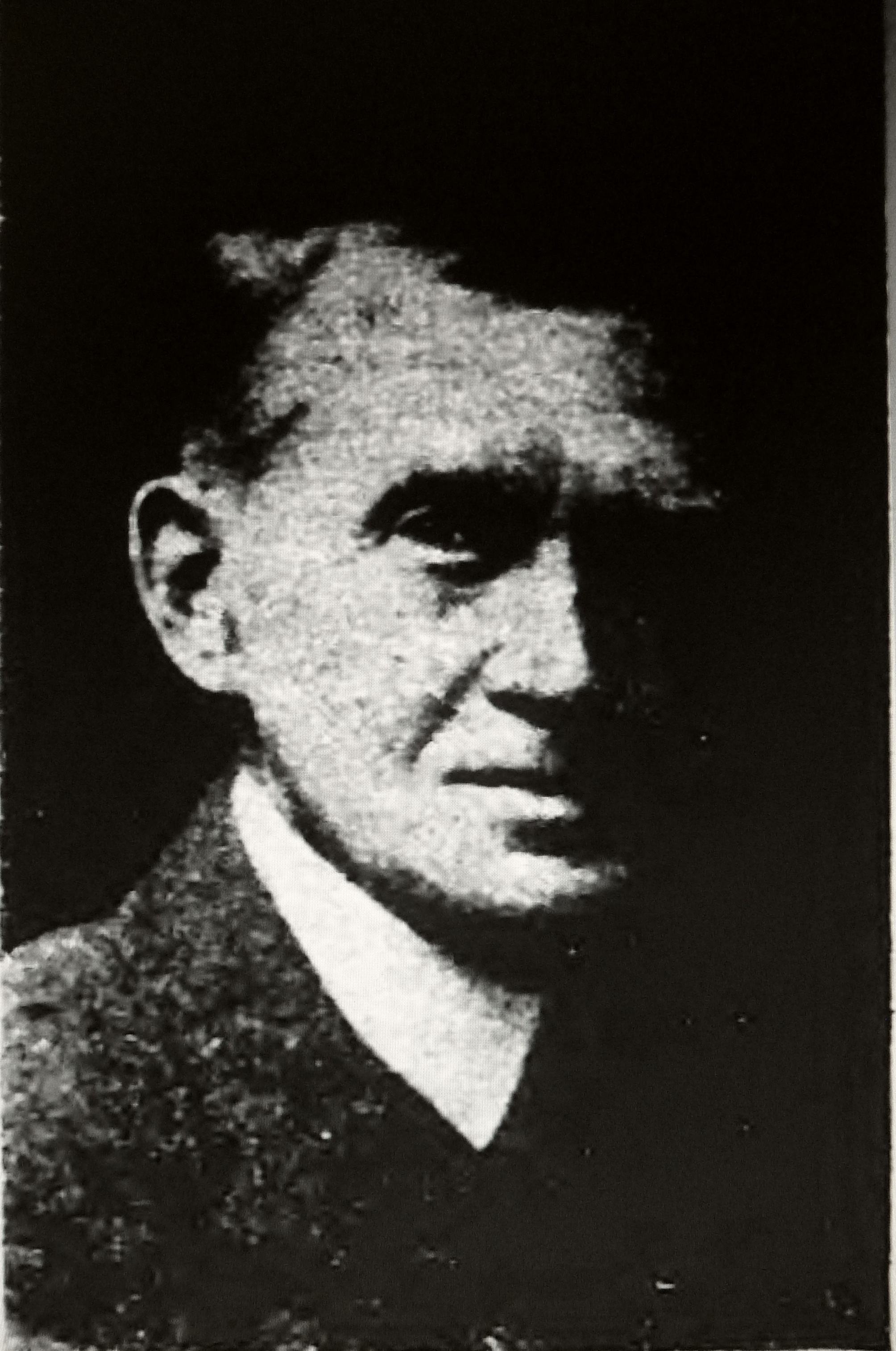
Stanley Powell of Tyes Place, a local benefactor, 1943

By 1940 the house was described as a "reconditioned farmhouse", in the occupation of the elderly local benefactors Margaret and Stanley Powell, who had spent time in Borneo. Stanley had been a brewer for Hammerton's, his father-in-law's company. During World War I they worked with Haywards Heath Hospital assisting wounded soldiers, and a ward was subsequently named the Margaret Powell Ward. In their hands, in 1918, Tyes Place became a "rest house for London clergy, Community Sisters, shop girls, and in fact all sorts of people". They later reclaimed the house as their home. The couple were also benefactors to various church causes, and "devout churchman" Stanley Powell's funeral at St Luke's Chapel at the hospital attracted three bishops and nine priests, besides management and staff of the hospital. (Note: The three bishops were: George Bell (Chichester), Leslie Lang (Woolwich) and Bishop Dagleish of the Society for the Propagation of the Gospel (missionaries).) Powell's ashes were interred with the Elder Brethren of All Hallows-by-the-Tower, London, at the behest of Rev. P.T.B "Tubby" Clayton, founder of Toc H, who had attended the funeral. After the death in 1949 of Margaret Powell, the house contents sale included "Jacobean, Queen Anne and Georgian furniture ... Persian carpets ... mink and beaver coats ... [and a] Rolls-Royce limousine".

=== Tyes Place after the Powells ===
When sold again in 1949 Tyes Place had become:

A charming old Elizabethan manor house, seven bedrooms, two dressing rooms, two bath rooms, three reception rooms and maids' sitting room, domestic offices. Garage. Matured lawns and gardens. Ornamental fish pond. Central heating. Electric light. Company's water. Just over 2.5 acres (1.0 ha) in all.

A more recent resident of Tyes Place was Emily Violet Long (d.1960).
