= Wild hops =

Wild hops is a common name for several plants

Wild hops may refer to:

- Wild growing forms of plants in the hop genus (Humulus) which may be used for flavoring beer
- Bryonia alba
- Clematis virginiana, a vine native to the eastern United States
- Daviesia elliptica
- Flemingia strobilifera, native to eastern Asia
