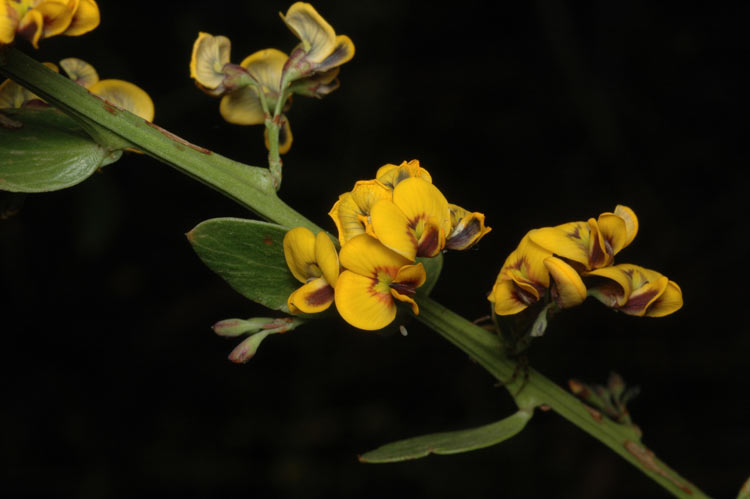
- In the Australian National Botanic Gardens

Scientific classification
- Kingdom: Plantae
- Clade: Tracheophytes
- Clade: Angiosperms
- Clade: Eudicots
- Clade: Rosids
- Order: Fabales
- Family: Fabaceae
- Subfamily: Faboideae
- Genus: Daviesia
- Species: D. elliptica

Binomial name
- Daviesia elliptica Crisp

Synonyms
- Daviesis latifolia var. parvifolia Benth.

= Daviesia elliptica =

Wild hops

Species of flowering plant

Daviesia elliptica, commonly known as wild hops, is a species of flowering plant in the family Fabaceae and is endemic to eastern Australia. It is an open, usually multi-stemmed shrub with scattered, narrowly elliptic to egg-shaped phyllodes, and yellow and red to maroon flowers.

== Description ==
Daviesia elliptica is an open, usually multi-stemmed. glabrous shrub that typically grows to a height of 1.0–1.5 m (3 ft 3 in – 4 ft 11 in) and has arching branches. Its leaves are reduced to crowded, elliptic phyllodes 6–50 mm (0.24–1.97 in) long, 3–25 mm (0.12–0.98 in) wide and glossy green. The flowers are arranged in one or two groups of four to ten on a peduncle 3.5–15 mm (0.14–0.59 in) long, the rachis 1.5–10 mm (0.059–0.394 in) long, each flower on a pedicel 1–4 mm (0.039–0.157 in) long with awl-shaped bracts about 0.8–1.4 mm (0.031–0.055 in) long at the base. The sepals are 3.0–3.5 mm (0.12–0.14 in) long and joined at the base, the two upper lobes joined for most of their length and the lower three triangular. The standard is broadly egg-shaped with a notch at the tip, about 7.0 mm (0.28 in) long, 7.5 mm (0.30 in) wide and yellow with a dark red to maroon base, the wings about 7 mm (0.28 in) long and yellow and maroon, and the keel about 5 mm (0.20 in) long and dark red. Flowering occurs from September to November and the fruit is a flattened, triangular pod 7–9 mm (0.28–0.35 in) long.

== Taxonomy and naming ==
Daviesia elliptica was first formally described in 1991 by Michael Crisp in Australian Systematic Botany from specimens collected near Tenterfield in 1984. The specific epithet (elliptica) means "elliptic".

== Distribution and habitat ==
Wild hops grows in the understorey of forest on sandy soils derived from granite from Dalveen in south-eastern Queensland to Guyra on the Northern Tablelands of New South Wales.

== Conservation status ==
Daviesia elliptica is listed as of "least concern" under the Queensland Government Nature Conservation Act 1992.
