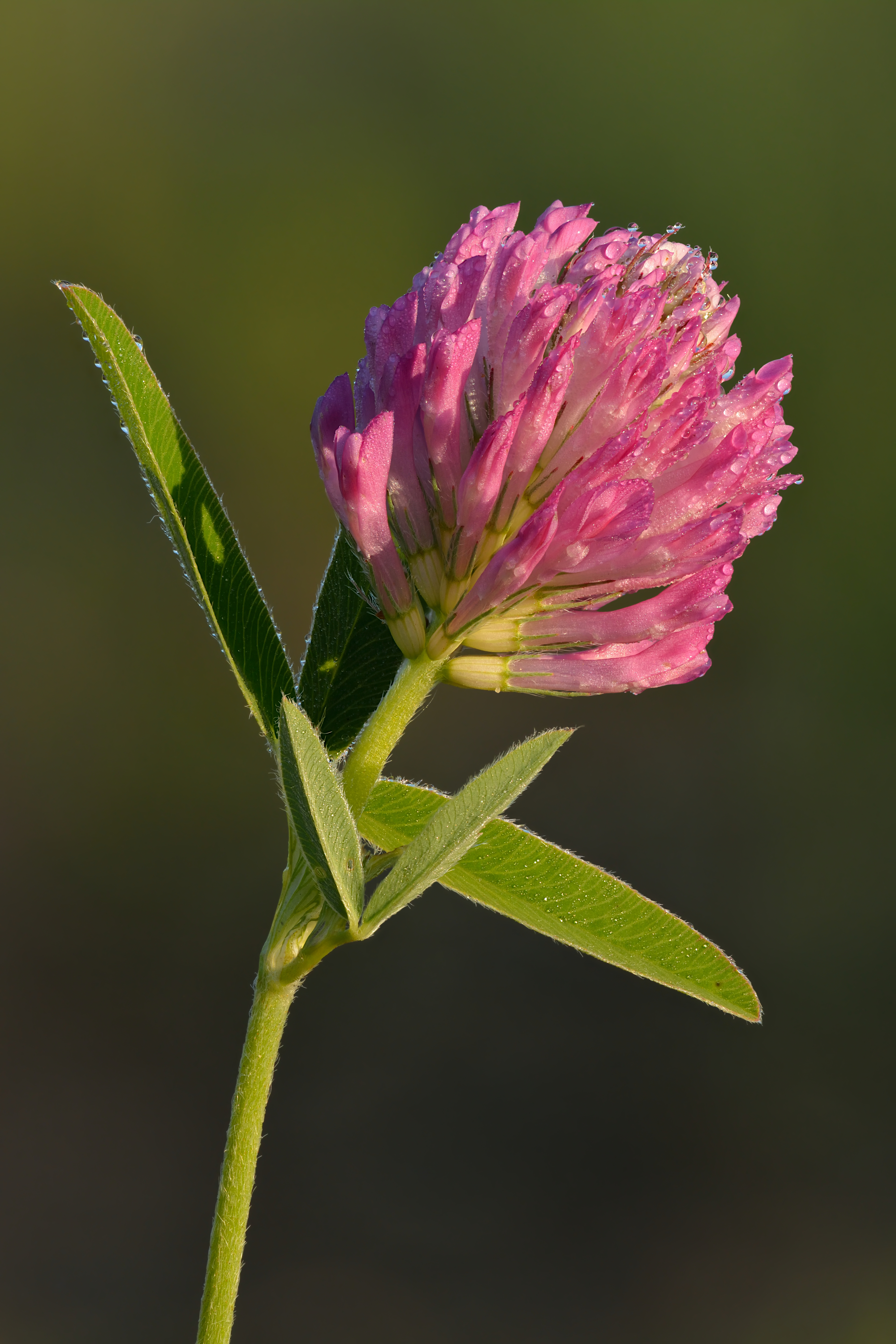

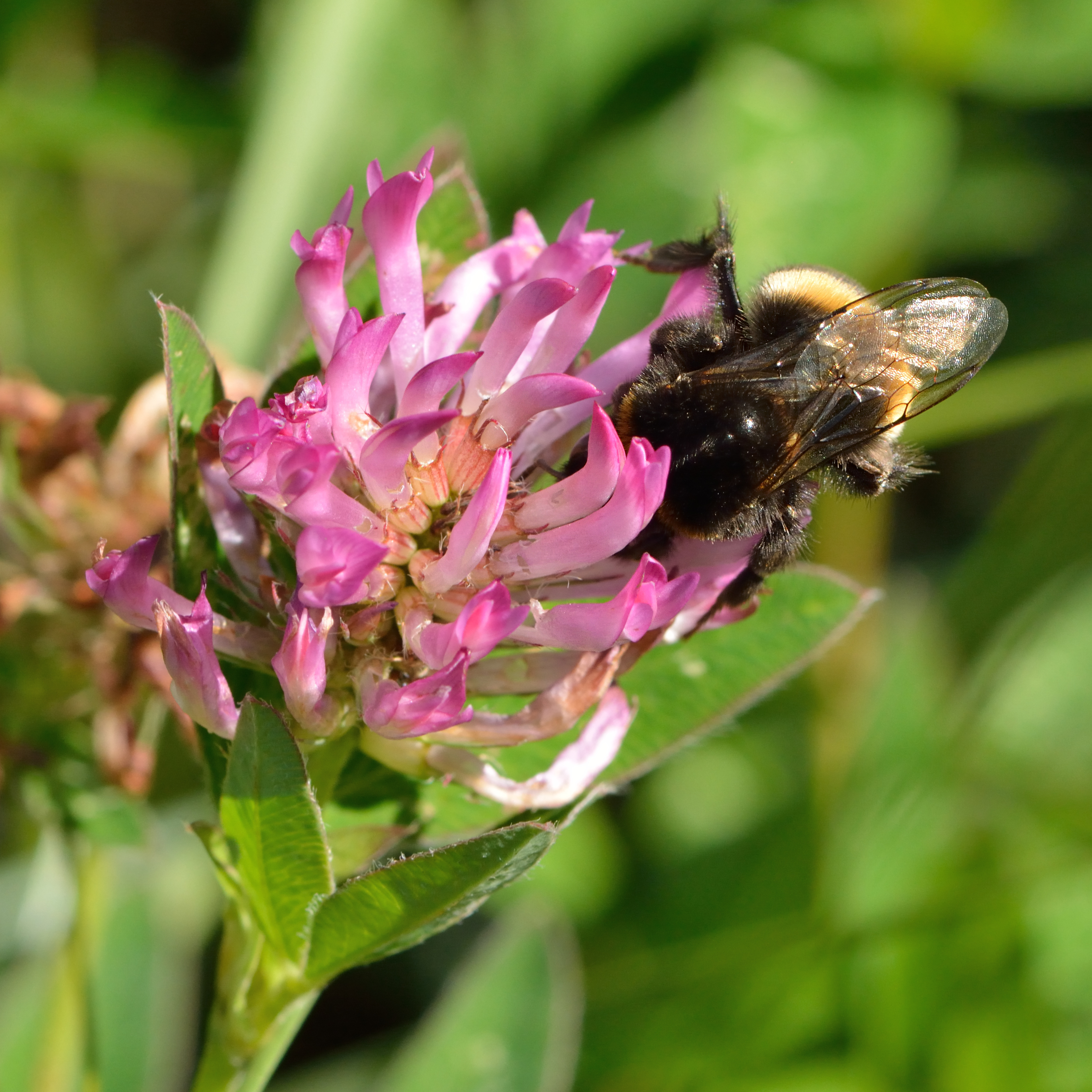

Scientific classification
- Kingdom: Plantae
- Clade: Tracheophytes
- Clade: Angiosperms
- Clade: Eudicots
- Clade: Rosids
- Order: Fabales
- Family: Fabaceae
- Subfamily: Faboideae
- Genus: Trifolium
- Species: T. medium

Binomial name
- Trifolium medium L.

Synonyms
- Trifolium flexuosum Jacq.; Trifolium sarosiense Hazsl.

= Trifolium medium =

Species of flowering plant

Trifolium medium, the zigzag clover, is a flowering plant species in the bean family Fabaceae. It is similar in appearance to red clover, Trifolium pratense, but the leaflets are narrower and have no white markings and the narrow stipules are not bristle-pointed.

The species is native to Europe from Britain to the Caucasus.

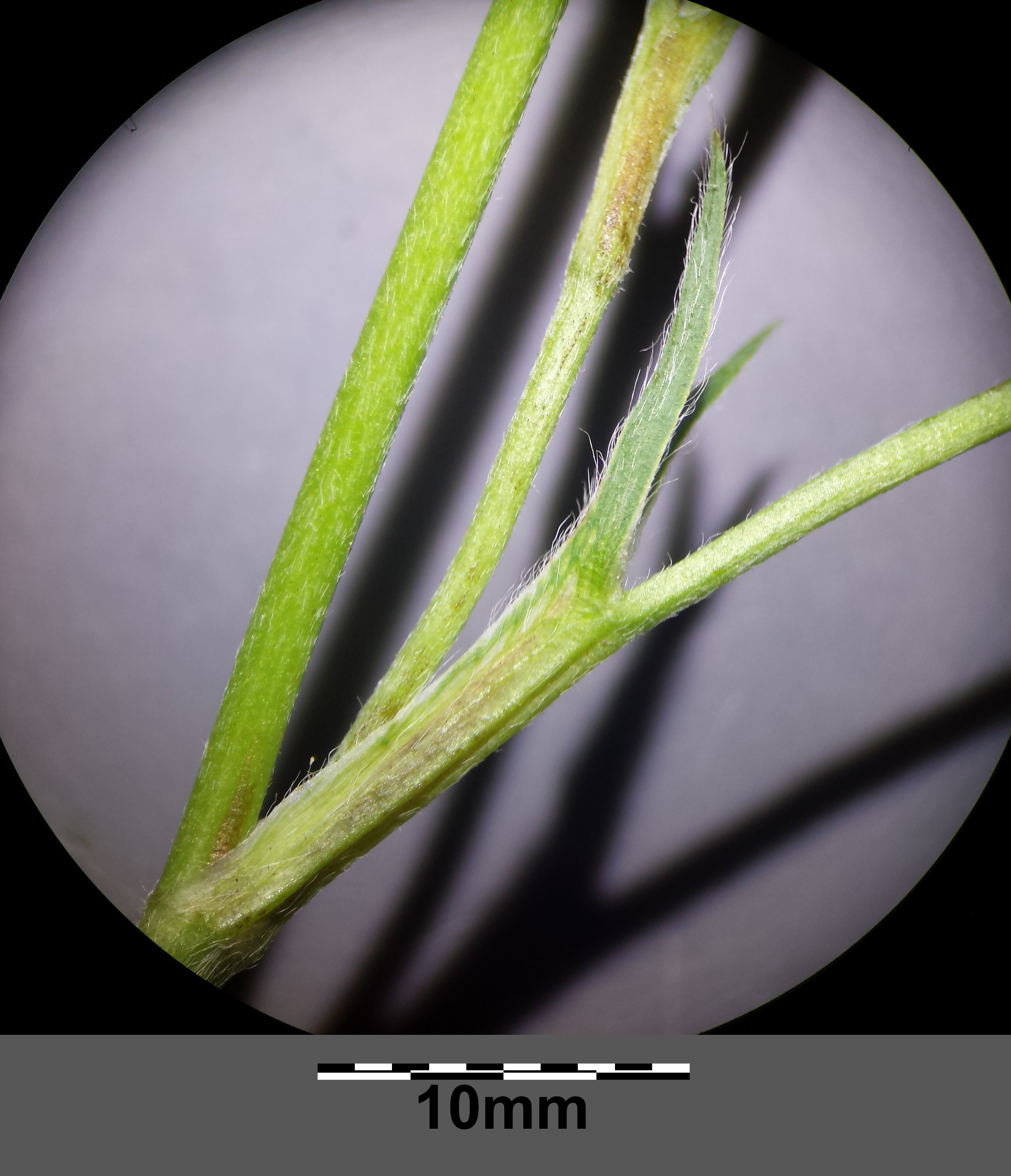
The stipules do not have conspicuous veins or a bristle point, unlike in red clover.
