= Scarlet elf cap =

Scarlet elf cap or Scarlet elf cup may refer to one of two small scarlet fungi:

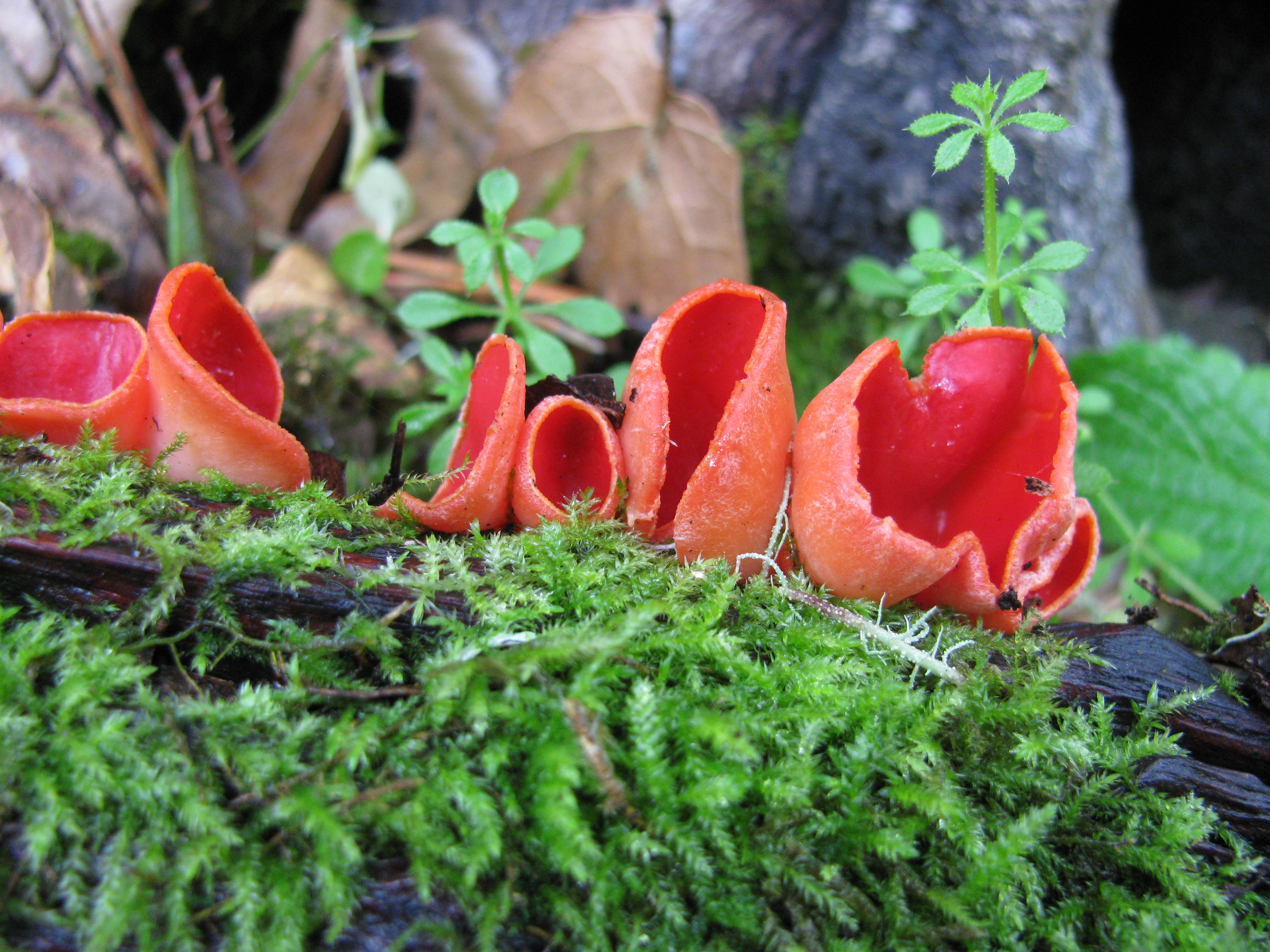
Sarcoscypha coccinea

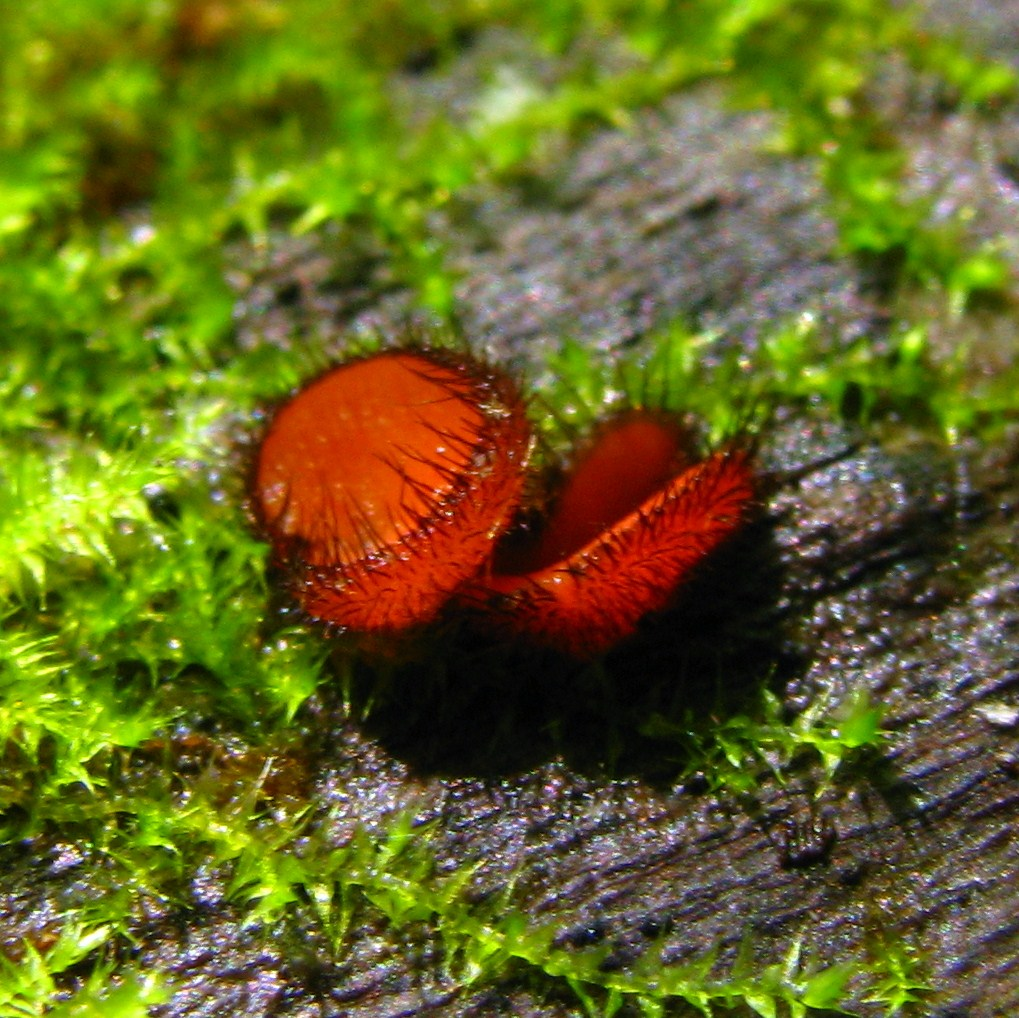
Scutellinia scutellata
