= Ansty, West Sussex =

Village in West Sussex, England

Coordinates: 50.99453°N 0.16131°W

Ansty
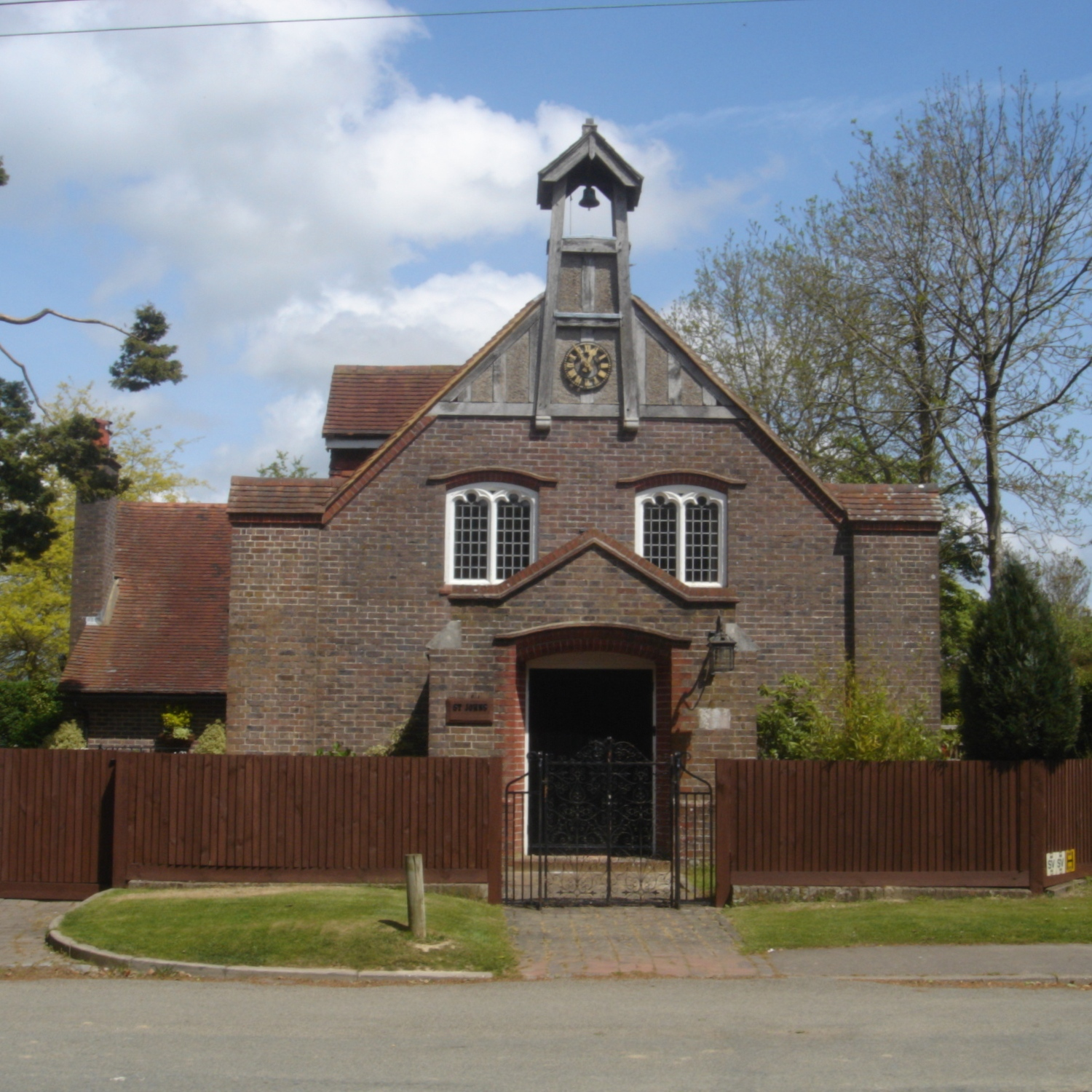
- Former C of E church

- Location within West Sussex
- OS grid reference: TQ291233
- Civil parish: Ansty and Staplefield
- District: Mid Sussex
- Shire county: West Sussex
- Region: South East
- Country: England
- Sovereign state: United Kingdom
- Post town: HAYWARDS HEATH
- Postcode district: RH17
- Dialling code: 01444
- Police: Sussex
- Fire: West Sussex
- Ambulance: South East Coast
- UK Parliament: Mid Sussex

Ansty is a village in the Mid Sussex district of West Sussex, England. It lies on the A272 road 1.4 miles (2.2 km) southwest of Cuckfield. It is in the civil parish of Ansty and Staplefield.

Ansty has a cricket team (Ansty Cricket Club), 1 football club (Ansty Sports and Social FC) and the Dark Star micro brewery.

== Pronunciation ==
Ansty or Anstye is traditionally pronounced with a heavy stress on the final syllable.

== Transport ==
The A272 & B2036 runs through Ansty. The A272 is the main route that connects the town of Haywards Heath and surrounding villages to the A23 Trunk Road. The B2036 is a north-south road that connects local traffic between Cuckfield & Burgess Hill.

The nearest railway station is in Haywards Heath, 3 miles away.

The Village is served by a bus service that runs between Haywards Heath & Horsham/Southwater
