= Staplefield =

Village in West Sussex, England

Coordinates: 51.0382°N 0.1816°W

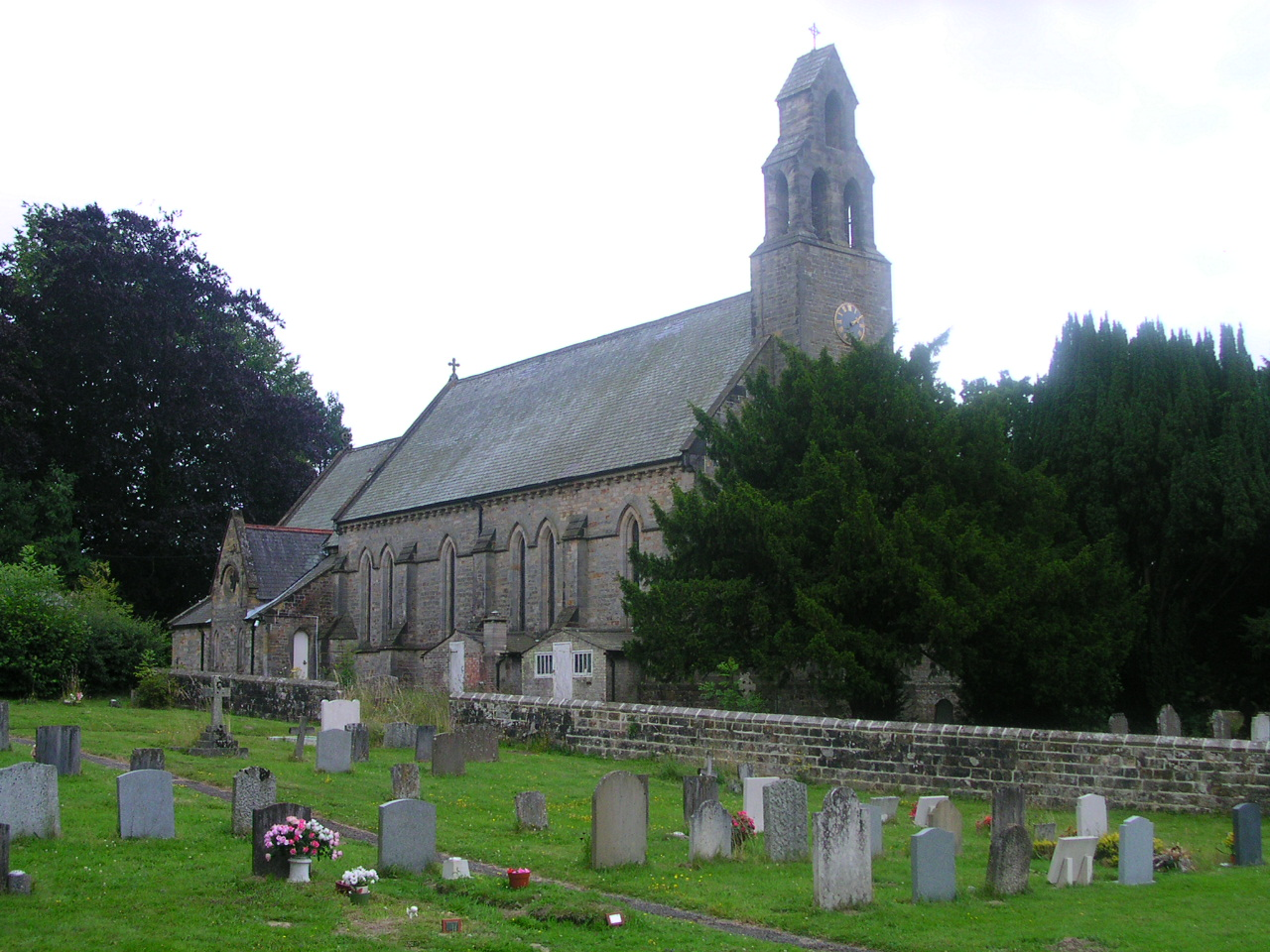
- St Mark's Church

- Location within West Sussex
- Population: Approx 440
- OS grid reference: TQ276281
- Civil parish: Ansty and Staplefield
- District: Mid Sussex
- Shire county: West Sussex
- Region: South East
- Country: England
- Sovereign state: United Kingdom
- Post town: Haywards Heath
- Postcode district: RH17
- Police: Sussex
- Fire: West Sussex
- Ambulance: South East Coast
- UK Parliament: Mid Sussex

Staplefield is a village in the Mid Sussex District of West Sussex, England, situated 6 kilometres (3.7 mi) north-west of Haywards Heath on the B2114 road. It is part of Ansty and Staplefield civil parish where the 2011 Census population information is included.

== History ==
The Anglican parish church built in 1847 is dedicated to St. Mark and contains wall paintings by the Victorian stained glass designer Charles Eamer Kempe. In 1994, Reverend Anthony Freeman, vicar of St Mark's was dismissed by the Bishop of Chichester, Eric Kemp, when he stated that he didn't believe in God and published his book God in Us: A Case for Christian Humanism. He is currently managing editor of The Journal of Consciousness Studies.

The village also has a Roman Catholic church dedicated to Our Lady of Fatima.

There are two public houses, The Jolly Tanners and The Victory Inn, the latter is named after the legal victory in gaining permission to be a pub not after Horatio Nelson's flagship, Victory, despite his sister, Catherine Matcham, living in nearby Slaugham. The pub sign shows a picture of a judge and a document inside the pub shows details of the case. The pubs are adjacent to the village green and cricket pitch.
