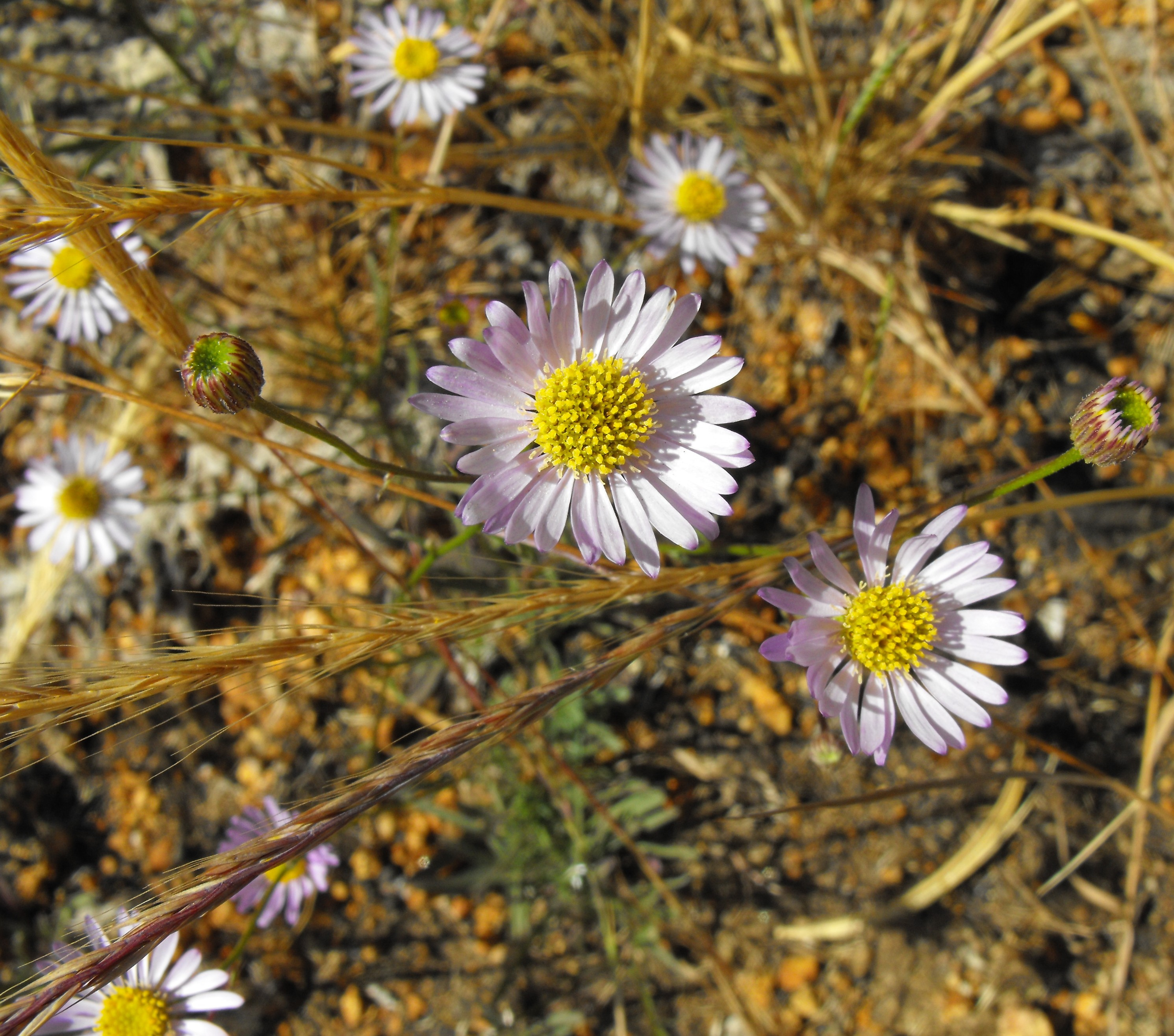
- At Lake Poway, in San Diego County

Scientific classification
- Kingdom: Plantae
- Clade: Tracheophytes
- Clade: Angiosperms
- Clade: Eudicots
- Clade: Asterids
- Order: Asterales
- Family: Asteraceae
- Genus: Erigeron
- Species: E. foliosus

Binomial name
- Erigeron foliosus Nutt.

Synonyms
- Synonymy: Erigeron foliosum Nutt.; Cineraria canescens Spreng.; Diplopappus occidentalis Hook. & Arn.; Erigeron brazoensis Buckley; Erigeron canescens Hook. & Arn.; Erigeron decumbens Benth. 1849 not Nutt. 1840; Erigeron douglasii Torr. & A.Gray; Erigeron fragilis Greene; Erigeron nuttallii A.Heller; Erigeron quercifolius DC.; Erigeron setchellii Jeps.; Erigeron stenophyllus Nutt. 1847 not Hook. & Arn. 1836; Erigeron striatus Greene; Erigeron tenuissimus Greene; Erigeron confinis Howell, syn of var. confinis; Erigeron blasdalei Greene, syn of var. hartwegii; Erigeron hartwegii Greene, syn of var. hartwegii; Erigeron mendocinus Greene, syn of var. mendocinus

= Erigeron foliosus =

Species of flowering plant

Erigeron foliosus, known by the common names leafy daisy and leafy fleabane, is a North American species of flowering plants in the family Asteraceae.

Erigeron foliosus is native to western North America from Oregon, through California, into Baja California. It can be found in many habitats, including chaparral, oak woodlands, and rocky talus.

== Description ==
In general, Erigeron foliosus is an erect, clumping and branching perennial daisy growing from woody roots to heights of anywhere between 20 centimetres (7.9 in) and 1 metre (3.3 ft).

Unlike some other fleabanes, it has leaves evenly spaced all over the stem. They may be thready or wide and flat, and are between 1–7 centimetres (0.39–2.76 in) long.

Atop each branch of the leafy stem is an inflorescence of one to several flower heads, each one to 1.5 centimetres (0.59 in) wide. The head has a center of golden yellow disc florets surrounded by a fringe of up to 60 pale to medium purple ray florets.

=== Varieties ===
The recognized varieties of Erigeron foliosus include:

- Erigeron foliosus var. confinis (Howell) Jeps. — endemic to Klamath Mountains in northwestern California + southwestern Oregon
- Erigeron foliosus var. foliosus — California (from Amador + San Mateo Counties south to San Diego County), Baja California
- Erigeron foliosus var. franciscensis G.L.Nesom — endemic to San Francisco Bay Area
- Erigeron foliosus var. hartwegii (Greene) Jeps. — California, Oregon
- Erigeron foliosus var. mendocinus (Greene) G.L.Nesom — Mendocino erigeron, Mendocino fleabane; Mendocino and Del Norte County, California
