= St Mary's Church, Broadwater =

Church in Worthing, West Sussex, England

Coordinates: 50.8278°N 0.3733°W

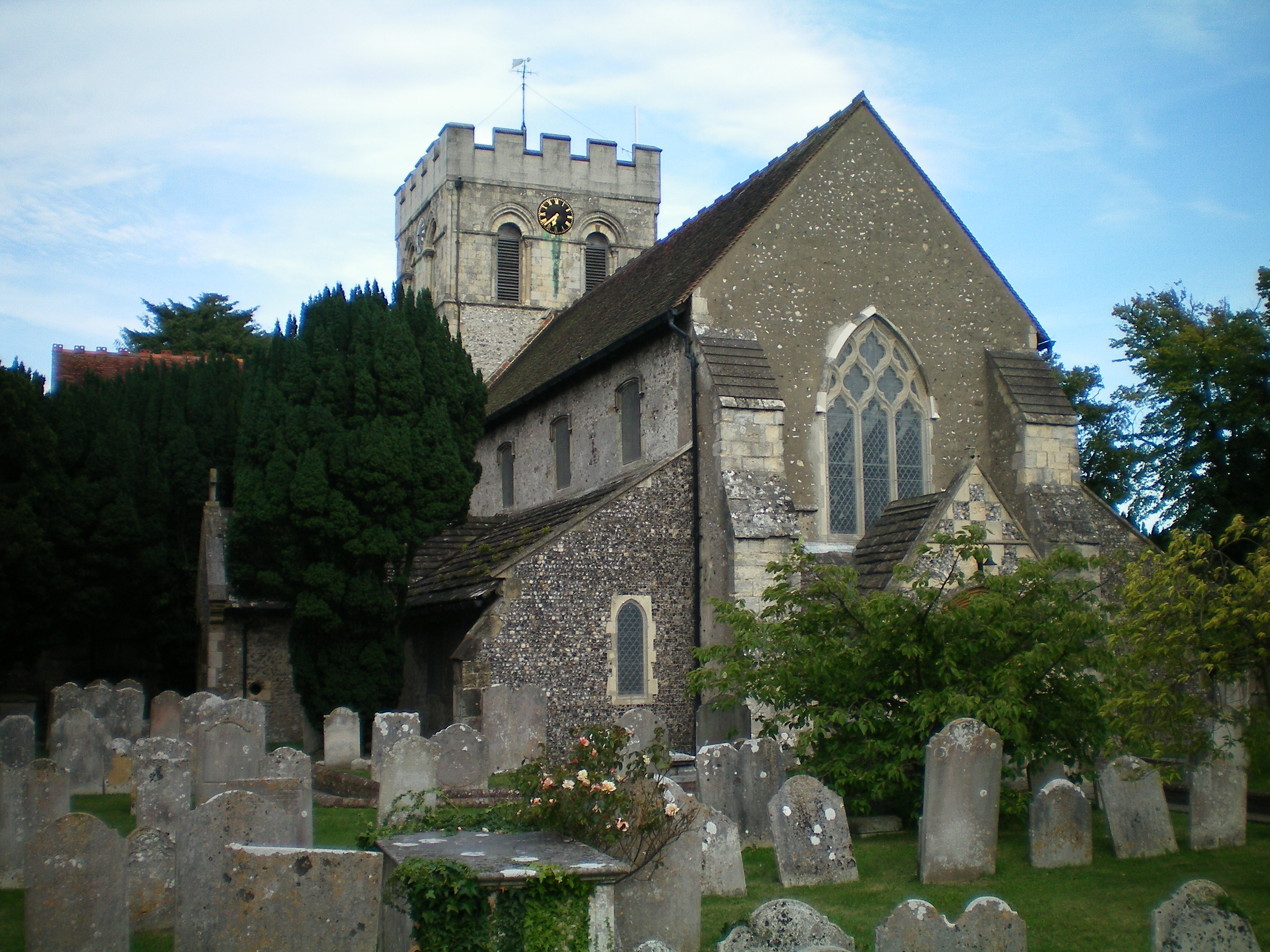
St. Mary's parish church, viewed from the northwest

St. Mary's Church, Broadwater, is a Church of England parish church in the Worthing Deanery of the Diocese of Chichester. It serves the ecclesiastical parish of Broadwater, West Sussex and is named after St. Mary. St Mary's is one of several sites in this benefice along with Queen Street and St. Stephen's.

== History ==
The church stands on the site of a Saxon building. The Domesday Book (1086) records ‘Bradewatre … ibi eccla’, “there a church”. A Saxon doorway can be seen from outside on the south side of the chancel. It was discovered during renovations in 1936. Other Saxon doorjambs and window arches are preserved within the walls of the present tower.

The present building is of Norman style using Caen stone and flints with Early English Gothic additions using Sussex Weald stone and flints. The clay subsoil has required successive repair and reinforcement of this tower. The first record of a Rector of the church in 1145 concurs with the view that the first smaller Norman building of a tower and short nave and chancel was erected in the mid 1100s.

In the 1200s the chancel was lengthened and the nave both lengthened and widened. At a similar time north and south transepts were built both to strengthen the tower and for three chantry chapels to be built off the north transept. These were removed in 1826. The remnants can still be seen outside the north transept. The tower was raised to allow a bell chamber and is now 60 feet high. Perhaps the most notable feature of the church is the western arch of the tower. Due to subsidence of the south-west corner of the tower in the 1200s the arch was remodelled into a Gothic form using the Norman stones. Viewed from the nave the Gothic and Norman arches form a unique picture.

The church underwent renovations in the 15th century. The north door into the nave (main entrance, facing the village) was renewed and a porch added, while windows and pillars in the aisled nave were altered. The low chancel screen was installed, with evidence that there was at some time another screen above it. In 1599 the altar slabs were removed by order of Queen Elizabeth I. The remains of a medieval one of Sussex Marble, partially concreted over, can be seen just inside the chancel, by the screen.

1819. The west door was added, and a gallery built at west end.

1826. The short shingled spire was taken down from tower. Three chapels, to the east of the north transept, were knocked down. The north transept was converted for use as a school, with a gallery. Box pews were installed in the nave. Galleries were built over both aisles.

1830. The tower was embattled and a turret was added over the spiral stone staircase in its southwest corner.

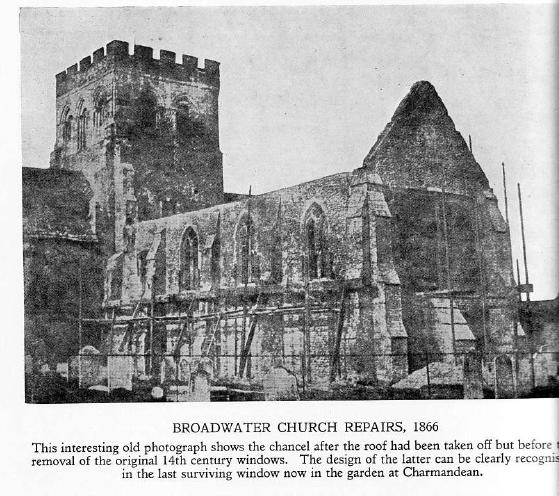
During chancel renovations

1852-55. The tower was strengthened by filling the spiral stone staircase in its southwest corner and removing the turret above it. A new wooden staircase to the tower was put in the north transept. The chancel walls were straightened, the roof replaced, the floor was raised and tiled, and the original side and east windows were replaced, except the one in the southwest corner which still dates from 15th century. Churchyard closed, no further burials. This renovation was partially funded by Ann Thwaytes while she was living at Charmandean, Broadwater between 1841 and 1866. One of the two-light windows was taken from the chancel during the chancel restoration and put in Mrs Thwaytes chapel in Charmandean house.

1864-66 The church was closed for 2 years while the nave roof was replaced. Galleries over the aisles, west end and north transept were removed. Box pews were replaced with pews and central heating installed. The Caen stone pulpit was erected, designed by Charles Hide, son of the architect in charge of this restoration. The previous Jacobean pulpit was moved to Holy Trinity church, Worthing. A Clergy vestry was built east of the south transept.

1887. West end rebuilt, reopened with porch. Door in south aisle blocked up.

1901. An article in the local paper sparked a rumour that there was a tunnel from church. There is no evidence of this at all.

1903. Clock placed in tower commemorating Reverend E K Elliot's 50 years as rector.

1938. Six 1712 bells were recast and two tenor bells added.

1953. Cox & Barnard of Hove installed a stained glass window in the south wall of the chancel. It shows John Wycliffe with a group of preachers.

1986. Wooden dais/platform built under the west arch of the tower.

1989. Tower battlements renewed.

2001-09 Church reordering with new lighting and heating; an improved toilet and kitchen and a first floor room in the north transept; all pews removed from the nave and some from the chancel; a new limestone tile floor with underfloor heating in the nave and the inner west door replaced with glazed doors.

2018 The Hosanna congregation, which had previously planted out from St Mary's and met on Sundays in the Broadwater Church of England Primary school was merged into St Mary's.

2020-21 Further Church reordering converting the kitchen into a toilet, converting the creche in the south transept (originally the 1864 clergy vestry) into a larger kitchen, and adding an extension to the south transept to provide a larger creche.

== Monuments ==
The most notable church monument is that of Thomas West, 8th Baron De La Warr on the north wall of the chancel. He was entombed in the church in 1524 and the tomb was found under the nave floor in 2009. His son, also Thomas, died in 1554 and has a Caen stone monument at the east side of the south transept, moved from the east end of the south aisle in 1826. His third wife, Eleanor Copley, was buried with him.

John Mapulton (also known as John Mapilton), rector of the church between 1424 and 1431 was clerk to the Court of Chancery and was chancellor to Queen Joanna, widow of Henry IV. The church has a brass dedicated to John Mapilton.

Two well-preserved brasses on a stone slab were found under old pews in 1826. This was set into the centre aisle of the nave and then in 2007 moved to be positioned vertically in the north transept. The main brass cross commemorates Reverend Richard Tooner who died in 1445. Below it is a memorial to John Corby, Rector 1393–1415.

The church also has a brass dedicated to 11 fishermen who died in 1850 while trying to save the crew of the Lalla Rookh, a ship caught in a storm off Worthing.

Surgeon John White is buried in the churchyard.

== Other burials ==
- Reginald West, 6th Baron De La Warr
- Thomas West, 9th Baron De La Warr
- Sir George West (d.1538)

== Rectors of St. Mary's ==
- Edwin Dines (2026–Present)
- Gaz Daly (2016–2025)
- Peter Irwin-Clark (2008–2015)
- John Berry (1998–2007)
- Peter Dominy (1984–1997)
- William Filby (1979–1983)
- Peter Marrow (1953–1978)
- Basil Mowll (1927–1952)
- Edward J Elliott (1906–1926)
- Edward K Elliott (1853–1905)
- Peter Wood (1797–18xx)
- Richard Russell (17xx)
- Richard Basset (1762–17xx)
- Samuel Terrick (1745–1761)
- Jeremiah Dodson (1714–1744, not Dobson)
- William Wade (1670–16xx)
- John Wood (1663–1669)
- Thomas Porter (1661–1662)
- Dr Edward Burton (1646–1660)
- Dr Granado Chester (1624–1645)
- Richard Holden (15xx–15xx)
- Francis Heydon (1575–15xx)
- James Wynnybank (1559–1574)
- R Cromar (15xx–1558)
- Reginald Harrison (1541–15xx)
- Reginald Sandys (1535–1540)
- John Lewknore (1521–1534)
- Jardin Kybow (1481–14xx)
- John Lamporte (1478–1480)
- Patrick Grebe (1457–1477)
- William Treverdon (1445–1456)
- Richard Tooner (1432–1444)
- John Mapulton (1424–1431)
- Thomas Lynche (1416–1423)
- John de Corby (1393–140x)
- Reginald de Newton (1373–1392)
- Walter Gest (1349–1372)
- Peter de Conshill (1322–1348)
- John de Chyshelle (also known as John Chishull) (1259–12xx)
- William (1248–1258)
- William (1190–1xxx)

A notable curate of the church was George Baillie Duncan (in the 1930s).
