= Burlison and Grylls =

English company

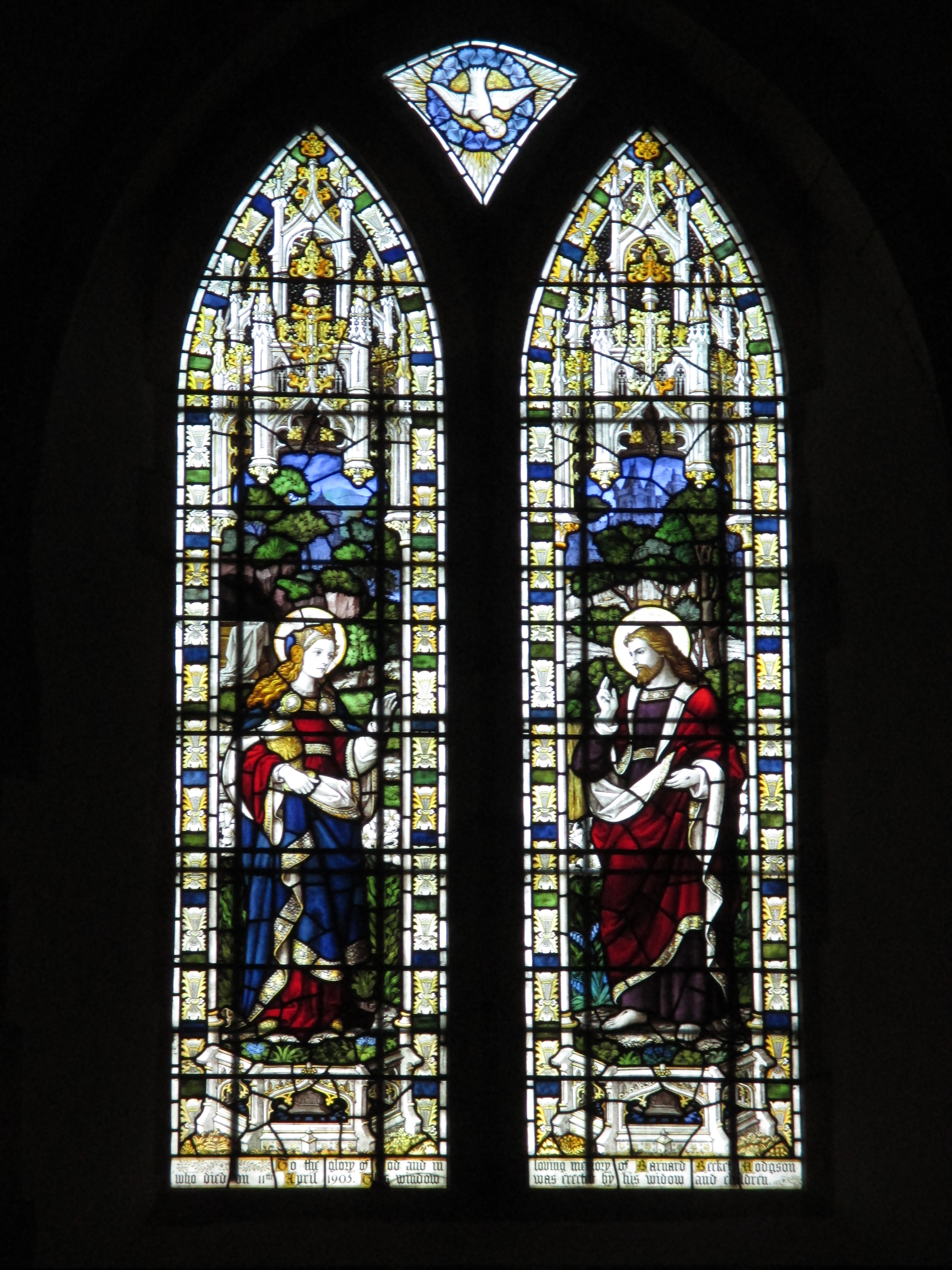
East window of St. Mary Magdalene's Church, Bolney, West Sussex

Burlison and Grylls is an English company who produced stained glass windows from 1868 onwards.

The company of Burlison and Grylls was founded in 1868 at the instigation of the architects George Frederick Bodley and Thomas Garner. Both John Burlison (1843–1891) and Thomas John Grylls (1845–1913) had trained in the studios of Clayton and Bell.

After Thomas John Grylls' death in 1913, the firm was continued by his son Thomas Henry Grylls (1873-1953), a founder Fellow of the British Society of Master Glass Painters. Its London premises were bombed and records destroyed in 1945 during WW2.

== Examples of their work ==
- Lady Chapel, Rochester Cathedral, Rochester, Kent
- St. Mary Magdalene's Church, Bolney, West Sussex
- St Chrysostom's Church, Manchester
- Church of the Holy Angels, Hoar Cross
- St. Aldhelm's Church, Branksome, Poole
- St Mary's Church, Eccleston, Cheshire
- All Saints, Wokingham, Berkshire
- St James' Church, Swarkestone, Derbyshire: east window of three lights, 1876
- St Michael's Church, Camden Town, London: three double side windows in north aisle and a two double windows in the side wall of the Resurrection Chapel
- St Peter's Church, Winchester: south chapel windows
- St Nicholas Chapel, Little Coggeshall, east window
- St Mary's Church, Portsea
- St Mary's Church, Hartley Wespall, Hampshire: windows following restoration by George Gilbert Scott in 1868
- St Andrew's Church, Jarrom Street, Leicester: two light window with circular light above, 1910
- Radley College, Oxfordshire: a sequence of nine windows in the chapel, designed and installed between 1894 and 1917
- Auckland Castle, County Durham: a series of windows in the chapel depicting the lives of the Northern Saints and of St Peter, installed in the 1880s.
- Govan Old Parish Church, Govan, Glasgow
- Saint Boniface Anglican Church, Antwerp
- Salisbury Cathedral, memorial in North East Transept.
- St David's Cathedral, Hobart
- St Margaret's Church, Topsham

== See also ==
- British and Irish stained glass (1811–1918)
- Victorian Era
- Gothic Revival
