= St Mary Magdalene's Church, Bolney =

St Mary Magdalene's Church
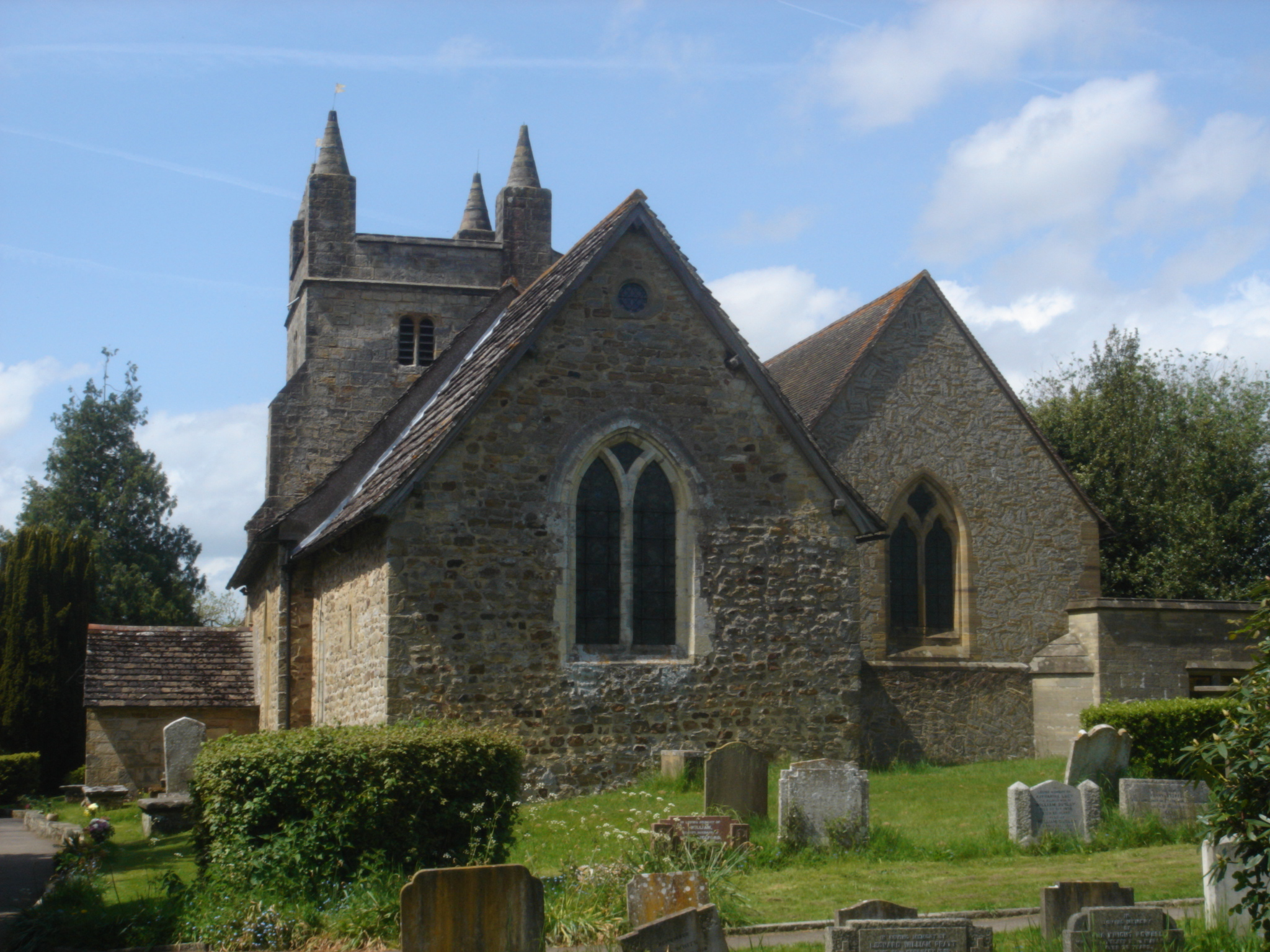
- The church from the east-southeast
- St Mary Magdalene's Church
- 50.9898°N 0.2035°W
- OS grid reference: TQ 26183 22687
- Location: The Street, Bolney, West Sussex
- Country: England
- Denomination: Church of England
- Website: stmarymagdalenebolney.org.uk

History
- Status: Parish church
- Founded: 11th century
- Dedication: Mary Magdalene

Architecture
- Functional status: Active
- Heritage designation: Grade I
- Designated: 28 October 1957
- Style: Norman

Administration
- Province: Canterbury
- Diocese: Chichester
- Archdeaconry: Horsham
- Deanery: Rural Deanery of Cuckfield
- Parish: Bolney

Clergy
- Priest(s): Fr. Martin Mills (Curate)

St Mary Magdalene's Church is an Anglican church in the village of Bolney in Mid Sussex, one of seven local government districts in the English county of West Sussex. The parish church, which is dedicated to Jesus' companion Mary Magdalene, serves a large rural parish centred on a village straddling the ancient London–Brighton road and apparently dates from about 1100, and an older origin has been suggested. Many structural additions have been made over the centuries—including a tower built solely using the labour of villagers—and at the entrance to the churchyard is a "magnificent" 20th-century lychgate made of local materials including Sussex Marble. The church is protected as a Grade I Listed building.

== History ==
Bolney is on the ancient London–Brighton road about 11 miles (18 km) north of Brighton and 7 miles (11 km) southeast of the market town of Horsham. The main road now bypasses the village to the east. Neither a settlement nor a church was recorded in the Domesday survey of 1086. The parish was first recorded as Bolneya or Bolne in the 13th century, and was one of 12 in the Hundred of Buttinghill in the Rape of Lewes. Despite the absence of earlier written records, some sources date the present church's origins to about 1100, around the start of the Norman era, and most others attribute it to that period without specifying a date. One study, however, suggested an earlier construction date based on the design and decoration of the south doorway, which was stated to have little in common with standard Norman work: comparisons were drawn instead with similar Saxon doorways at 8th- to 11th-century churches elsewhere in England and at nearby Wivelsfield.

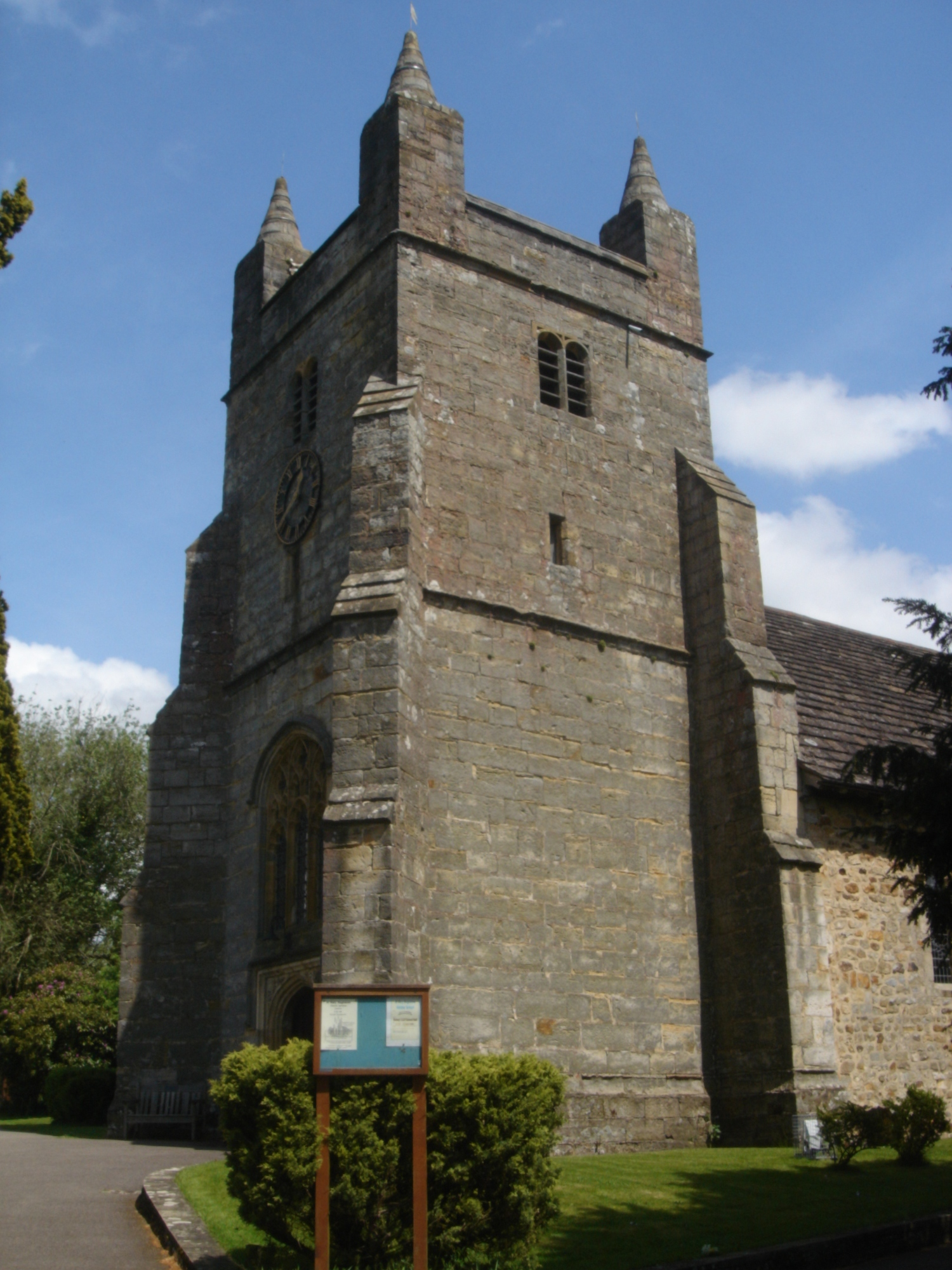
The 16th-century tower was erected solely by the efforts of villagers.

The church was built on hilly ground overlooking Bolney from the south, and was reached by a twitten (a narrow lane) from the village street. The core of the Norman building consisted of a nave, a narrower chancel set at an angle, one window in the east wall and the doorway in the south wall of the nave. To this was added the main east window in the end of the chancel—a large traceried window dating from about 1300. The south wall of the chancel has a window of a similar date, and on the same wall is a 13th-century piscina.

The next structural alteration, a west tower that "dominates the church", came in 1536–38: the date is known precisely because details of costs and progress were recorded in the churchwarden's record book, which still exists. The churchwarden at the time was John Bolney, also a significant and wealthy landowner in the parish, whose family was long established in the area. Described as the "moving spirit" behind "an inspired community effort involving the whole village", he paid for the tower to be built and arranged for dozens of villagers to use their skills and any money they could offer to quarry the sandstone, cut and shape it, build temporary bridges and paths to transport the material to the church, build tools and wooden scaffolding, and erect the 66-foot (20 m) tall, 12-by-12-foot (3.7 m × 3.7 m) structure at the west end of the church. The project was completed in 1538, and a new west doorway was inserted below John Bolney's coat of arms and the commemorative wording This Step^{l} is 66 Foot high.

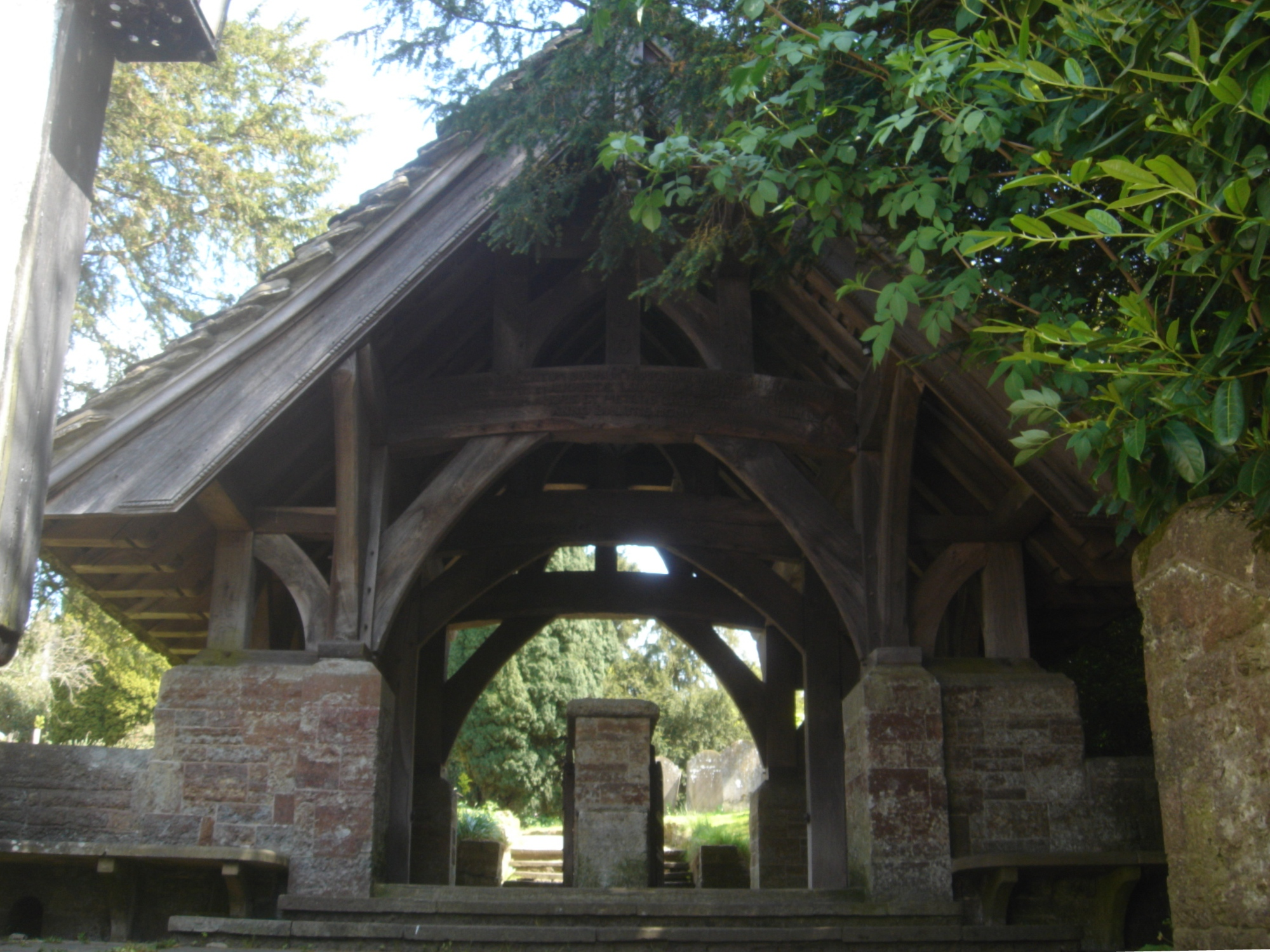
The oak and Sussex Marble lychgate dates from 1905.

The church continued to expand as the congregation grew. A west gallery for choristers was inserted in 1670—an early example of the practice, common in Sussex, of building accommodation for a choir at the west end of a church so the congregation could face them when they sang. Organs were sometimes too expensive for churches to buy, so choral music by local singers was often preferred instead. West-end galleries only became prevalent in Sussex churches in the early 18th century, though. A porch was built on the south side in 1718, enclosing the Saxon/Norman doorway; and as part of a Victorian restoration, the capacity was increased in 1853 when the nave was extended with a north aisle. A clock was added to the tower in 1898 to commemorate Queen Victoria's Diamond Jubilee. A vestry was added in 1912, and general work was carried out in the nave and chancel during the 1930s. A modern stained glass window by prolific Sussex-based firm Cox & Barnard was inserted in the south aisle in 1982; it depicts a rural scene.

The Huth family were important in church life in the 19th and 20th centuries. Henry Huth was a bibliophile whose enormous collection of rare books was sold for £300,000 in 1910 (£30,550,000 in 2025). He lived in an extravagant château-style 1870s house called Wykehurst Place in the parish, and was buried in the churchyard after his death in 1878. In 1905, his son Edward gave the church a large, "magnificent" lychgate constructed from local materials: oak, millstones from a mill in the parish, Sussex Marble (a locally quarried limestone) and a Horsham Stone slab roof. It stands at the end of the twitten leading to the churchyard, which has been left slightly overgrown to conserve wildlife. A mid-19th-century rector planted the churchyard and rectory grounds with a wide range of trees, many of which survive—including Bhutan pines and oaks from Somerset. There are many Victorian tombs and grave-markers in the churchyard, including some rare wooden grave-boards and some with wooden cross-pieces set between stone balls. Another of Huth's sons, Alfred Henry Huth—who also became a book-collector and author, and who died in 1910—is commemorated by a memorial tablet inside the church; its style was described by Nikolaus Pevsner as "neo-late 17th-century".

== Architecture ==
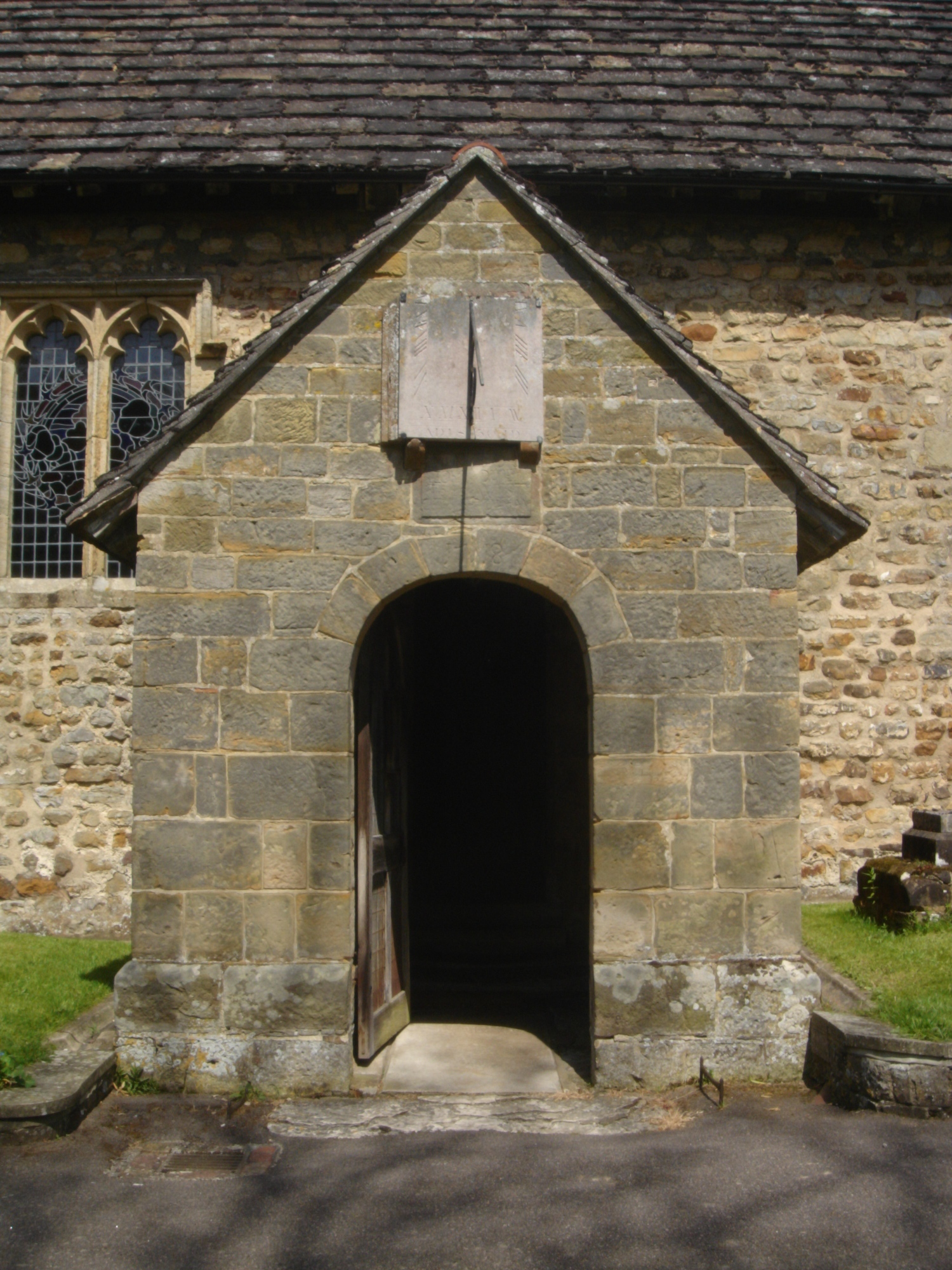
The south porch was added in 1718.

The church consists of a nave, an angled chancel offset slightly towards the north, a 66-foot (20 m) tower at the west end, a north aisle, separated from the nave by a three-bay pointed-arched arcade, a vestry on the north side and an entrance porch on the south side. There are other entrances in the base of the tower and its stair-turret. The nave is 42 feet (13 m) long and 20 1/2 feet (6.2 m) wide; the chancel measures 23 1/2 by 18 feet (7.2 m × 5.5 m) and has walls of 3 feet (0.91 m) thickness. They are separated by a chancel arch. The walls are of rubble laid in courses with sandstone dressings, except for the tower (which is ashlar) and the Victorian north aisle, whose walls are in the style of crazy paving. The east windows in the chancel and north aisle have y-tracery, and a small oculus is set below the gable of the chancel wall above the main window. The roof is tiled with Horsham Stone.

The two-stage tower has mouldings defining its upper and lower stages, and stands on a moulded plinth. Diagonal corner buttresses provide support. A stair-turret topped with a parapet is attached on the north side. The tower itself terminates in a squared-off parapet with "heavy" pinnacles which Nikolaus Pevsner considered to be 17th-century. They are topped by tapering finials with weather vanes. Above the Perpendicular Gothic west doorway, which has "nicely carved" and moulded spandrels and a four-centred arch, are John Bolney's coat of arms (whose heraldic description is Or a crescent with two molets gules in the chief) and the inscription This Step^{l} is 66 Foot high which was added in 1538 upon completion of the tower. A peal of eight bells is set in a bell-chamber near the top of the tower, lit by four two-light, flat-arched windows. The church is well known for this large complement of bells and the regular bellringing that takes place, and the ancient pub opposite the church is named The Eight Bells in recognition of this.

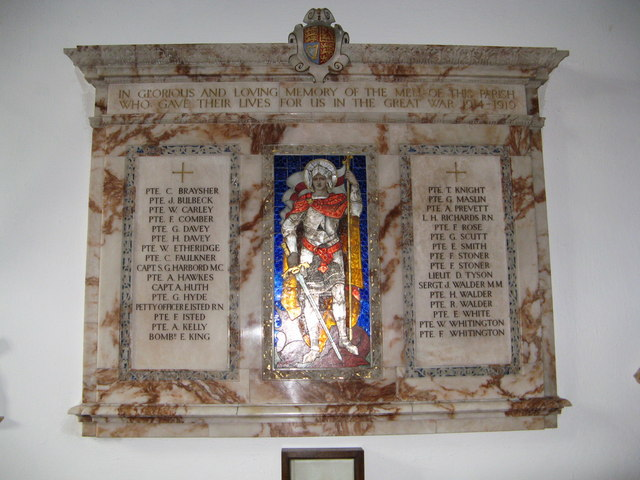
This war memorial plaque bears the name of Captain A Huth.

The south doorway, described as the "best" and "most interesting architectural feature" of the church, is narrow, tall and surrounded by bands of characteristically Norman reeding similar to the style of nearby St Peter and St John the Baptist's Church in Wivelsfield. It has a splayed inner archway with re-cut imposts. Nine voussoirs make up the arch. The dimensions on the inside are 46 inches (120 cm) wide, 9 1/2 feet (2.9 m) high to the top of the arch and 19 inches (48 cm) deep. The "extremely interesting" decoration on the exterior consists of carved v-shapes (not identical to standard Norman chevron ornamentation) with inward- and outward-facing points at various intervals.

A common feature on the south side of ancient churches was a mass dial—a type of sundial that served as a "do-it-yourself clock". They consisted of circular markings engraved in a wall, with lines dividing the hours and a hole in which to place a gnomon or stick. At Bolney there is one scratched into a stone dressing on the southeast side of the nave, and another on the jamb of the south doorway. A large 19th-century sundial is also situated in the gable of the south porch.

Inside, there are various plaques and stained glass windows commemorating former parishioners; the coat of arms of Queen Anne, painted on a wooden panel above the chancel arch (a "strangely numerous feature in Sussex", such decorations are uncommon in England as a whole); 17th-century and more recent oak panelling in the sanctuary; and a 20th-century font.

== The church today ==
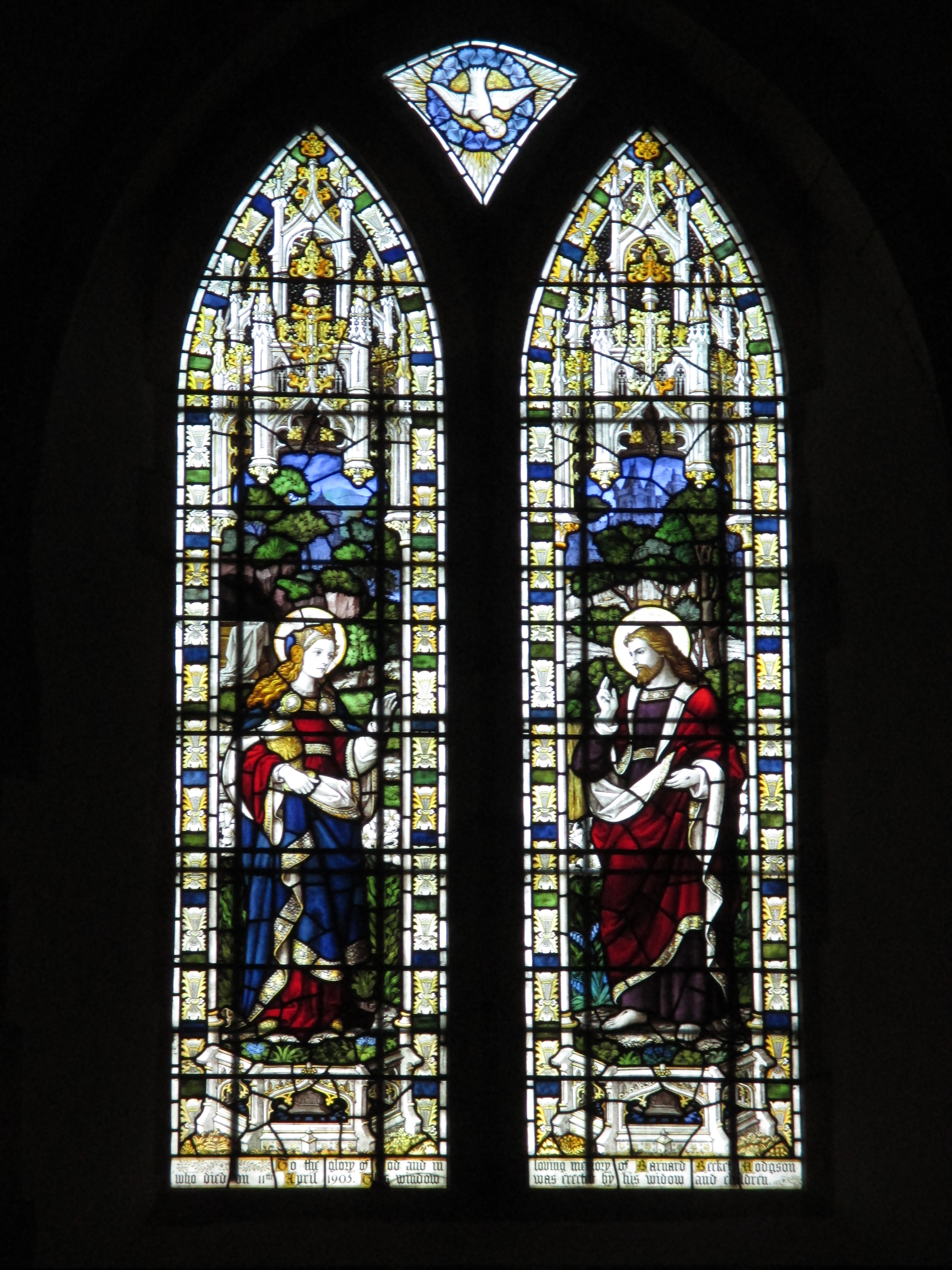
East window by Burlison and Grylls, c. 1905

St Mary Magdalene's Church was designated a Grade I Listed building on 28 October 1957.

The ecclesiastical parish of Bolney covers a large rural area centred on the village and bisected by the A23 and A272 roads. It extends towards the villages of Cowfold, Twineham and Warninglid. Regular Eucharistic and prayer services are held on Sundays and weekdays.

The advowson (the right to appoint clergy) was first recorded in 1316, when it was held by a prebendary linked to Chichester Cathedral. In the 19th century it was taken up by the Bishop of Chichester himself; in 1901 it passed to Edward Huth in exchange for the advowson of Etchingham parish in East Sussex. Huth, an alumnus of Exeter College, Oxford, passed it to the college in 1929.

== See also ==
- Grade I listed buildings in West Sussex
- List of places of worship in Mid Sussex
