= Cox & Barnard =

English stained glass company

Cox & Barnard Ltd
- Company type: Limited company
- Industry: Stained glass design and manufacture
- Founded: 1919 (Hove, England)
- Founder: Albert William Loomes
- Defunct: June 6, 2014
- Headquarters: Hove, United Kingdom
- Key people: Oliver Cox, William Barnard
- Products: Stained glass, leaded lights, decorative glass
- Services: Glass restoration
- Website: web.archive.org/web/20120402221438/http://www.coxandbarnard.co.uk/

Cox & Barnard Ltd was a stained glass designer and manufacturer based in Hove, part of the English city of Brighton and Hove. The company was founded in Hove in 1919 and specialised in stained glass for churches and decorative glass products. Many commissions came from Anglican and Roman Catholic churches in the English counties of East Sussex, West Sussex and Kent. The company was also responsible for six war memorial windows at an Anglican church in Canada, made from shards of glass collected from war-damaged church windows across Europe.

== History ==
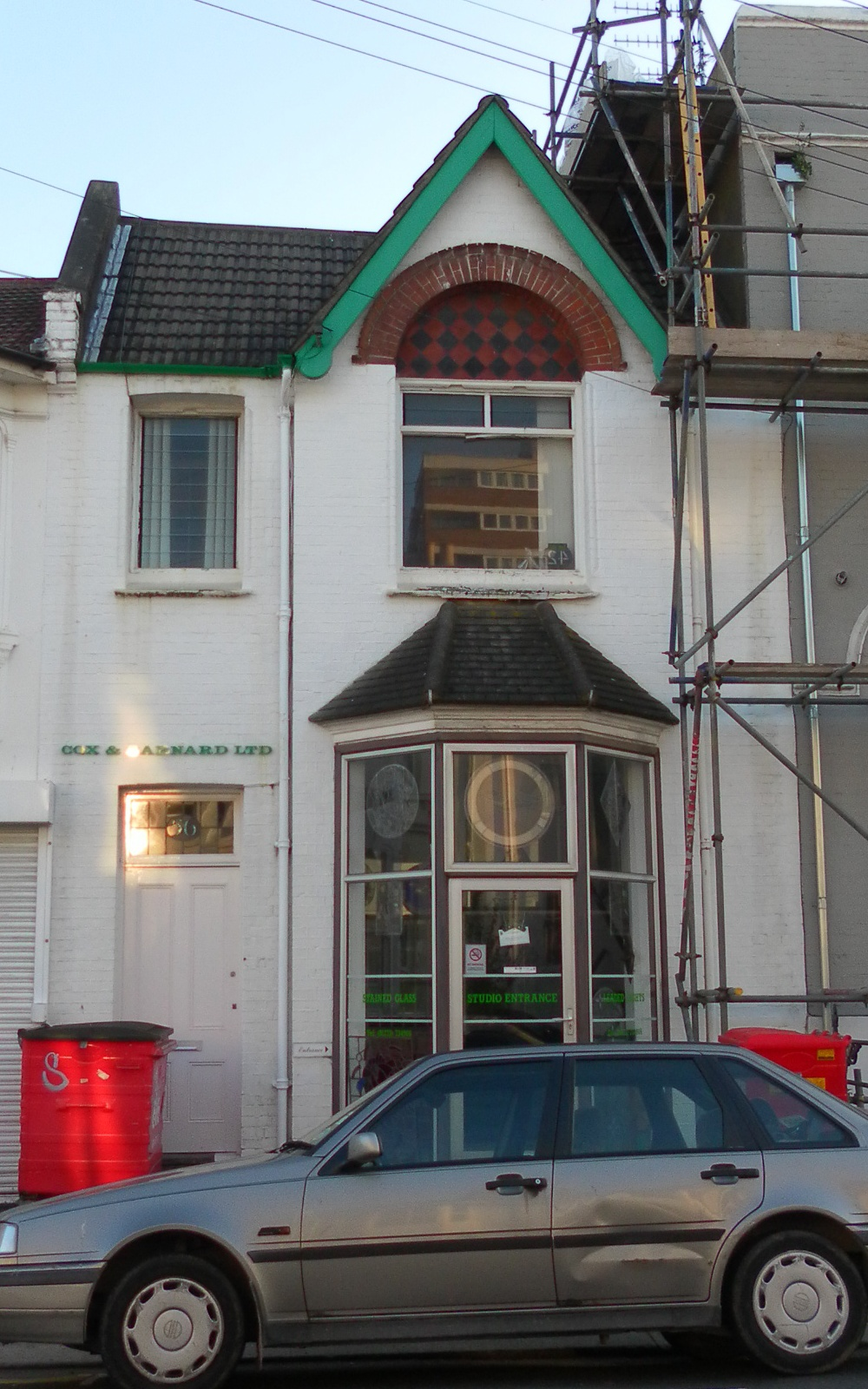
The company was based at this building in Hove.

Albert William Loomes established the firm as A.W. Loomes in 1903-4, operating out of a building in 7 Blatchington Road in Hove. He died in 1920, and the business was left to his employees Oliver Cox and William Barnard. They renamed the company and moved to new offices at Old Shoreham Road. The premises were later extended, giving a design studio at the front and an extra storey above. In 1968, the firm bought the former Livingstone Road Baths building from Hove Council and converted it into a new office. The building's former use was commemorated by an elaborate stained glass window designed in-house and displayed near the entrance: it depicted three old-fashioned metal baths, a variety of people bathing or carrying supplies, and a coal-fired boiler with its copper pipework. The company continues to operate from the premises, which combine design and manufacturing facilities and a showroom which is open to the public.

Cox & Barnard received many commissions in the Brighton and Hove area, for both religious and secular buildings. Many of the interwar semi-detached houses in the Nevill Road area of Hove have Art Nouveau-style leaded light panels and roundels in their doors and porches; and the Metropole, Brighton's largest hotel, had some stained glass installed during its postwar reconstruction. The firm designed a glazed canopy at the entrance of the former Hove Town Hall (destroyed by fire in 1966), featuring the design of the Hove coat of arms; in 1946 they installed a window in the tower of the medieval parish church of Portslade, St Nicolas' Church; and in the late 20th century they designed stained glass windows for two synagogues in Hove and restored the windows in the 19th-century Middle Street Synagogue in Brighton.

During my first few moments in England, the appalling destruction of homes and churches alike, along with the courage of the British people, made it desirable to link their sacrifice with ours.

— Major Rev. Harold Appleyard, August 1946

Most of the firm's work has been done elsewhere in southeast England for Anglican and Roman Catholic churches—either in the company's own name or in the name of an individual designer working for them. One commission also came from outside England. In the early 1940s, Major Rev. Harold Appleyard, an army chaplain from The Royal Regiment of Canada, started collecting fragments of stained glass from church windows destroyed by World War II bombing. He had already accumulated shards from more than 100 damaged churches in countries across Europe when in 1944, immediately after 40 soldiers from the regiment died at Louvigny, he found a piece of bright red glass from the French town's bombed church. This inspired him to turn his collection of fragments into a window to commemorate them and other victims of the war. He had already spent part of his tour of duty in England (his glass collection included shards from Coventry Cathedral, St James's Church in Dover and several of Christopher Wren's London churches), and after the war he returned to the country to find a stained glass manufacturer that could create a window from the hundreds of fragments—preferably using the old-fashioned technique of using sawdust as a drying agent. He approached Cox & Barnard, and their designers were able to produce six mosaic-style windows; these were shipped to Canada and taken to Appleyard's parish church—Christ Church Anglican in Meaford, Ontario—where they were installed and dedicated in 1946 in a ceremony broadcast in Britain and Canada.

On the sixth of June 2014 the company was dissolved.

== Anglican churches ==
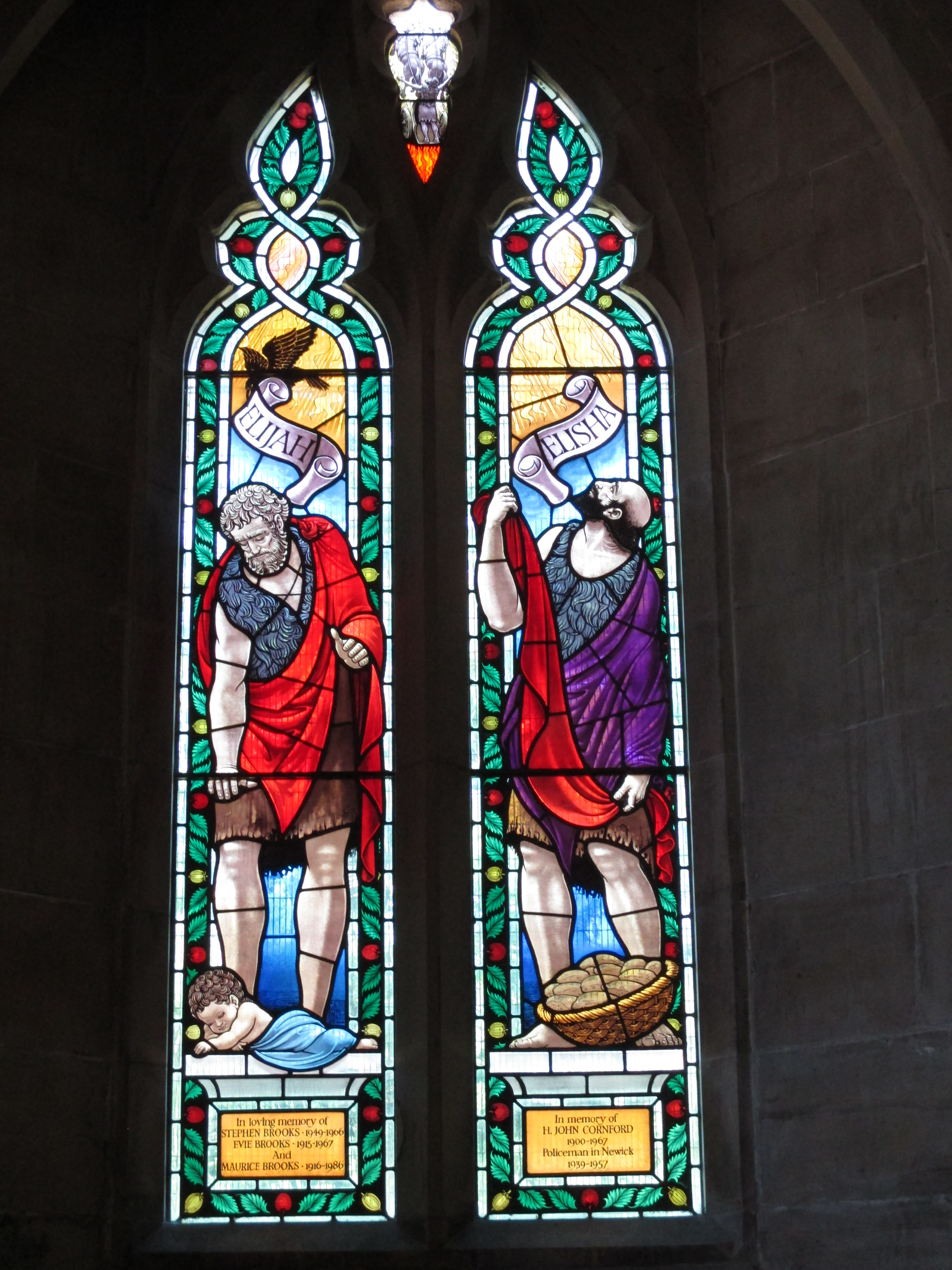
A window at St Mary's Church, Newick

St Mary's Church, Newick, East Sussex: Elijah and Elisha are depicted in a Cox & Barnard window of 1986 in the north aisle of Newick's church. The aisle was added to the 12th-century church in 1836.

All Saints Church, Staplehurst, Kent: The firm's work in Staplehurst's parish church consists of six windows supplied in 1952 and designed by Owen Jennings. Those in the north chapel (one single-light and one two-light window) and the north aisle (three two-light windows) have heraldic badges and emblems, and another two-light window in the north aisle has a Nativity scene. Holy Trinity Church, Eridge Green, East Sussex: The church at Eridge was built in the 1850s and altered in 1875. Working for Cox & Barnard, Charles Knight designed three windows for the church: one in the north transept in 1950 (depicting the Good Shepherd and the "Suffer Little Children" passage from the Gospel of Matthew), and two of the three lights in the east window in 1956 (showing the virtues of Charity and Faith).

Holy Trinity Church, High Hurstwood, East Sussex: Ewan Christian designed the church in this hamlet in the parish of Buxted in 1870–72. Harry Mileham designed a window for the south side of the nave showing Saint Francis; it was installed in 1958, but Mileham had died the previous year. Paul Chapman added a window depicting Saint Christopher and Saint Luke in the north aisle in 1959.

St Andrew's Church, Moulsecoomb, Brighton and Hove: The church serving the Moulsecoomb housing estate in Brighton was completed in 1934. Many design elements refer to Saint Andrew's occupation of fisherman, including Cox & Barnard's stained glass which was installed throughout the church in and after 1998. The transepts have windows with four fish. There is also a window with a blue cross.

St Andrew's Church, West Tarring, West Sussex: In this old church serving a village which is now part of Worthing, the firm's designer Paul Chapman was responsible for the windows in the west end of the north and south aisles. They were installed in 1958 and depict Saint Thomas of Canterbury and Saint Richard of Chichester respectively.

St James's Church, Riddlesdown, London Borough of Croydon: In 2003, Cox & Barnard supplied stained glass windows depicting Saint Cecilia and Saint Francis de Sales for the parish church of Riddlesdown. They were installed in the north porch.

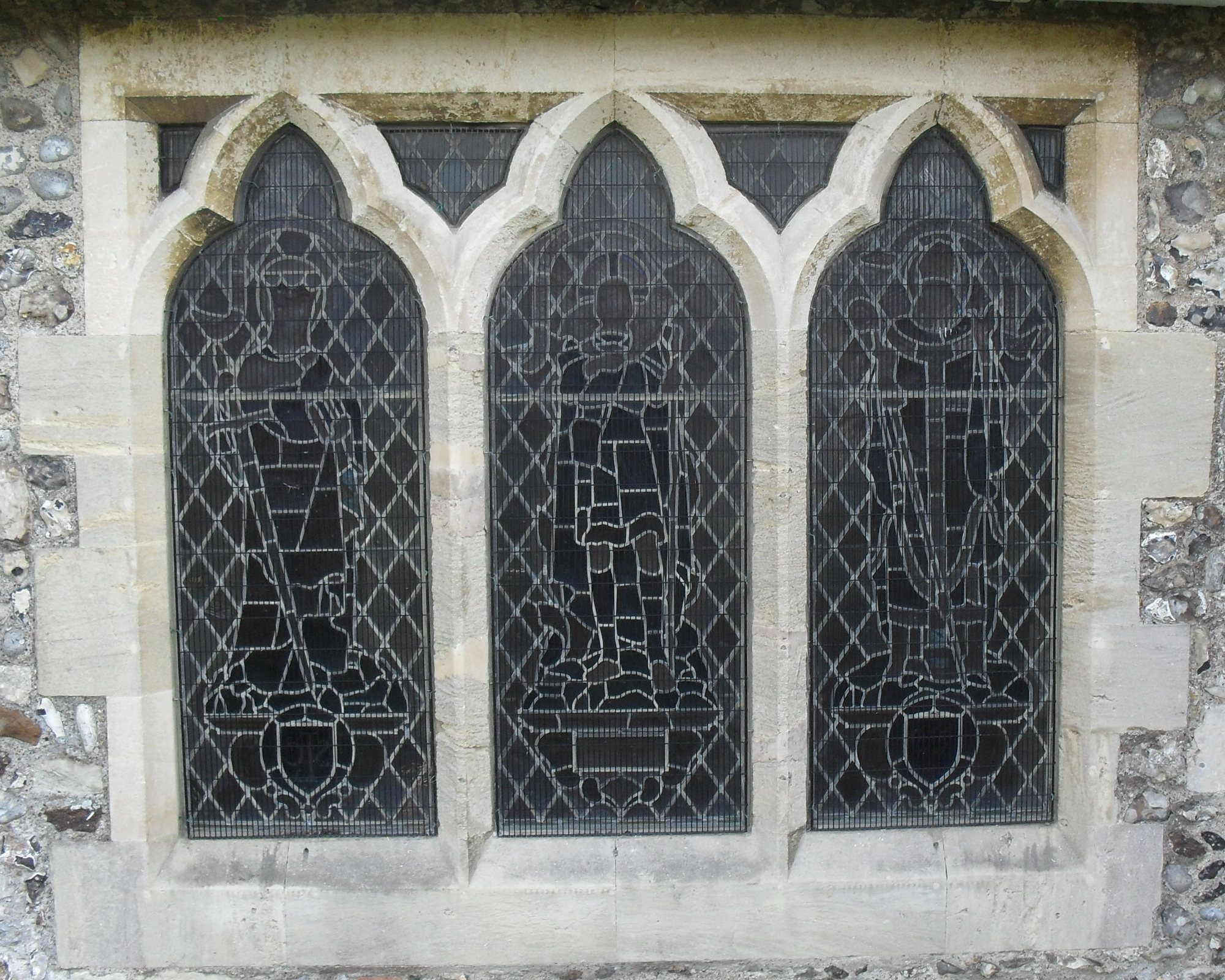
This window at St Leonard's Church in Seaford was designed by Cox & Barnard in 1954.

St Leonard's Church, Seaford, East Sussex: A window of 1864 in the north aisle of Seaford's parish church was replaced in 1954 by Cox & Barnard's three-light design featuring Saint Richard of Chichester, the Good Shepherd and Saint Katherine.

St Mary's Church, Broadwater, West Sussex: The ancient parish church of Broadwater, now part of Worthing, has a Cox & Barnard window of 1953 in the south wall of the chancel. John Wycliffe is shown with a group of preachers.

St Mary's Church, Hailsham, East Sussex: Hailsham's 13th-century church lost its stained glass during World War II bombing raids. The firm designed the new four-light east window, depicting a Nativity scene, in 1954.

St Michael and All Angels Church, Southwick, West Sussex: The firm's designer Ken Adams supplied a memorial window for the north aisle of Southwick's parish church in about 1950. It shows the Presentation of Jesus.

St Nicolas Church, Portslade, Brighton and Hove: The ancient parish church of Portslade, now a suburb of Hove, has a Cox & Barnard window in its tower. Installed in 1946, it commemorates former verger A.C. Wheatland and depicts the church's patron saint Nicolas.

St Philip's Church, Hove, Brighton and Hove: Cox & Barnard supplied three windows at this Grade II-listed church of 1895 in the Aldrington area of Hove. The firm's designer Anthony Gilbert provided a window in the south chapel in 1955, depicting Saint George and commemorating parishioner George Howell. In 1960 Paul Chapman designed another window in the same part of the church, in memory of William Cheverton. Saint Cecilia is shown holding a musical instrument; she has "an unusual halo resembling yellow laurel leaves interspersed with roses". In the same year, a window commemorating Halcyon Ann Lopez and depicting the virtue of Charity, was designed in the firm's own name and installed in the south side of the nave.

St Wilfrid's Church, Haywards Heath, West Sussex: One source claims that Cox & Barnard were involved in the restoration of the stained glass in the west window and the north aisle windows at Haywards Heath's parish church, but they may in fact have worked on some of the other windows in the church.

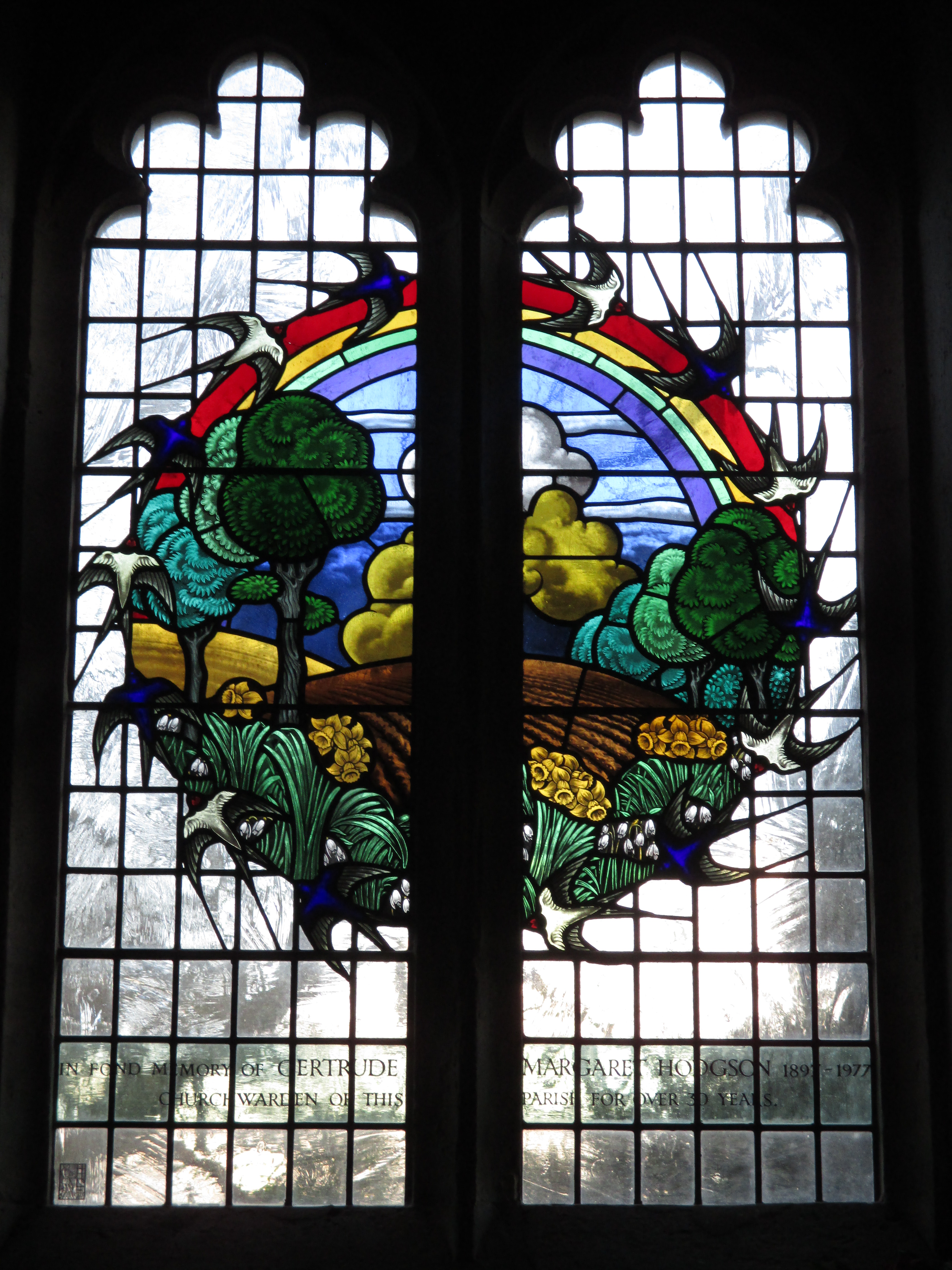
A window at St Mary Magdalene's Church, Bolney

St Mary Magdalene's Church, Bolney, West Sussex: Bolney's 11th-century parish church has one Cox & Barnard window in the south aisle, depicting a rural scene. It was installed in 1982.

== Roman Catholic churches ==
Church of Our Lady Immaculate and St Michael, Battle, East Sussex: Cox & Barnard designed the three stained glass windows in the south wall of the nave of this "somewhat unusual" Romanesque Revival church of 1886. Their first, dating from 1988, depicts the Battle-born Catholic martyr Thomas Pilcher. The Holy Family are shown on another from 1998, and the following year the firm supplied a Millennium window showing various saints and local views.

Church of Our Lady of Gillingham, Gillingham, Kent: The windows in Gillingham's Roman Catholic church represent a near-complete scheme by Cox & Barnard: there is only one older stained glass window by another firm. Represented in various windows in the chancel and nave, and dating from several years between 1980 and 1991, are Mary in various depictions (the Immaculate Mary, the Blessed Virgin and her Assumption into Heaven, and as Our Lady of Gillingham), Saint Raphael, Saint Gabriel, Saint Michael, Saint Alban, Saint Margaret Clitherow, Saint John Fisher, Saint Thomas of Canterbury and Saint Thomas More.

Church of the Sacred Heart, Hove, Brighton and Hove: This church of 1880–81 has an extensive scheme of murals and stained glass by Nathaniel Westlake, including his final work, but Cox & Barnard also designed a single window in 2001. It depicts Saint Francis and is in the centre light of the three in the west window.

Corpus Christi Church, Henfield, West Sussex: Only the east window in this modern church in the village of Henfield has stained glass. It was made in 1974, the year the church opened, and depicts a chalice surrounded by coloured glass.

St Edward the Confessor's Church, Keymer, West Sussex: Keymer's modern Roman Catholic church (built in 1973) has three windows by the firm: the first, depicting the Holy Spirit, was installed in the nave in 2002; others showing the Madonna and Child and Jesus with a group of children were made in 2005 and 2008.

St Luke's Church, Hurstpierpoint, West Sussex: Two panelled windows flanking the altar in Hurstpierpoint's church depict its patron saint Luke as a doctor and an artist respectively. They were designed by Cox & Barnard in 1999.

St Mary's Church, Preston Park, City of Brighton and Hove: The east window in the south chapel of this large early 20th-century church has a Cox & Barnard window with Christian symbols surrounded by multi-coloured glass.

St Pancras' Church, Lewes, East Sussex: Lewes's Roman Catholic church received two Cox & Barnard-designed windows in 1989. They are set in the two-light window in the north aisle; one light represents the Blessed Virgin Mary, and the other shows Saint Philip Howard.

St Peter's and St John's Church, Camberley, Surrey: A nine-panelled east window with coloured glass set in rhomboid shapes is the only piece of stained glass in this church in the Surrey town of Camberley. It was made by Cox & Barnard in 1982.

St Thomas of Canterbury's Church, Mayfield, East Sussex: The present Roman Catholic church in the village of Mayfield dates from 1957. Cox & Barnard made a window for the chancel in 1987, depicting Jesus in a boat preaching to His disciples, and another in 2000.
