= Mileham (surname) =

Mileham is a surname. Notable people with the surname include:

- Harry Mileham (1873–1957), British artist
- Kevin Mileham (born 1971), South African politician
- Lacy Barnes-Mileham (born 1964), American discus thrower
- Matthew Mileham (born 1956), British hammer thrower
