= Hickstead =

Hickstead may refer to:

- All England Jumping Course at Hickstead, a show jumping venue in England
- Hickstead (horse), an Olympic gold medal-winning show jumping horse
- Hickstead, a hamlet in Twineham civil parish, in the Mid Sussex District of West Sussex, England.
