= Bolney =

Village and parish in West Sussex, England

Coordinates: 50.9898°N 0.20352°W

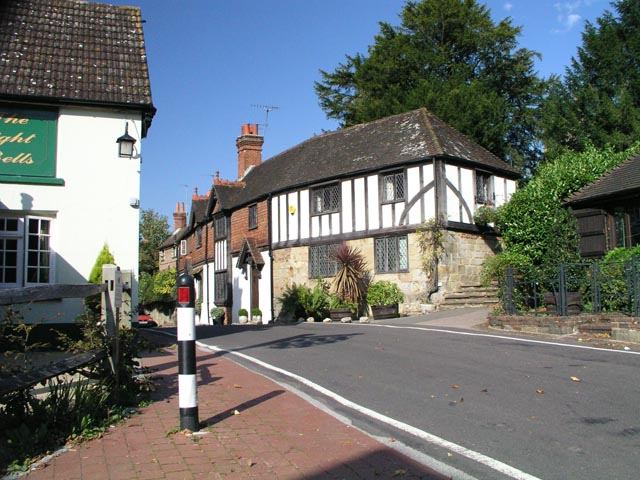
- Bolney Street

- Location within West Sussex
- Area: 14.79 km^{2} (5.71 sq mi)
- Population: 1,209 2001 Census; 1,366 (2011 Census)
  - Density: 82/km^{2} (210/sq mi)
- OS grid reference: TQ261227
  - London: 35 miles (56 km) N
- Civil parish: Bolney
- District: Mid Sussex
- Shire county: West Sussex
- Region: South East
- Country: England
- Sovereign state: United Kingdom
- Post town: HAYWARDS HEATH
- Postcode district: RH17
- Dialling code: 01444
- Police: Sussex
- Fire: West Sussex
- Ambulance: South East Coast
- UK Parliament: Mid Sussex
- Website: http://www.bolney.com/

Bolney is a village and civil parish in the Mid Sussex district of West Sussex, England. It lies 36 miles (58 km) south of London, 11 miles (18 km) north of Brighton, and 27 miles (43 km) east northeast of the county town of Chichester, near the junction of the A23 road with the A272 road. The parish has a land area of 1,479.41 hectares (3,655.7 acres). In the 2001 census there were 1209 people living in 455 households of whom 576 were economically active. At the 2011 Census the population had increased to 1,366. Nearby towns include Burgess Hill to the southeast and Haywards Heath to the east.

The majority of the village sits between the A23 to the east, and the A272 to the south and consists of a main north–south road called The Street and towards the top of the village by Top Street, Cherry Lane and Ryecroft cutting east/west. Outside of this area the village extends south of the A272 down Bolney Chapel Road and to the East of the A23 in Crossways. The Bolney crossroads of the A23 and A272 has always been an accident black spot, and even with the building of the A23 flyover the area still has a high level of accidents and incidents on its stretch of the A23.

== History ==
It is believed the name of the village came from the Anglo-Saxon word “Bolne” meaning “a village (or high place) near marsh”, as the area is on high ground in an area that was marshy. Saxon road timbers have been excavated in The Street and there is a suggestion that this was an old route north into St Leonard's Forest.

In mediaeval times the village was noted for its cherry fair and iron smelting and until the early 20th Century a windmill existed on the Common.

At the heart of the village is St Mary Magdalene's Church, which partly dates from the 12th century. The tower houses the first ring of eight bells in Sussex, the oldest dating to 1592. At the top end of the village in Top Street there is another place of worship, the Bolney Village Chapel.

Historically the Village was in two parts the main village was clustered around the church and to the north there was the Common. House building up The Street during the 20th century joined these two parts together.

The last remaining pub in the village is called The Eight Bells in reference to the set of bells in the village church.

The village has a relatively high number of listed properties, with two main clusters at the south, around the church and to the north, in what was originally the Common. In terms of parishes, Ansty and Staplefield lies to the east, Cowfold to the west, Twineham to the south and Slaugham to the north.

== Notable buildings and areas ==
Map

Bolney is divided between Low and High Weald. In the Low Weald the ground is Weald clay but the soils in the High Weald is made up of the Hastings Group of beds (so-called because they outcrop along the Hastings cliffs). The Hastings Group is largely sandstone which helps form the hills, valleys and gills (streams) characteristic of the High Weald. The Wealden gills (rocky streams) come from St Leonard's Forest and Worth Forest. There are eight ancient trees in the parish and they are all English Oak.

Bolney village (TQ 261 227) includes a council estate and smaller houses, and a scatter of older cottages at the south end by the church and at the north end on the site of the old Bolney Common. The church is handsome, but the churchyard has been cultivated and has lost its old flowers and fungi. The adjacent cricket ground still has an old meadow fungl assemblage (2011).

Wykehurst Park to the north has a pseudo-French chateau (TQ 257 243) of 1872–4, built for a rich Austrian banker and now turned into flats, after a chequered history. The park has retained a feeling of unity, despite reportedly being in multiple ownership: groups of tall conifers; lots of rough, semi-improved and some unimproved pasture; a furze field, small woods, streams and ponds. At Markwells Farm, to the north of Wykehurst, there were a series of semi-intact meadows (TQ 265 255), where the scarce and jewel-like "Blowfly of the Dead", Cynomya mortuorum, can be seen.

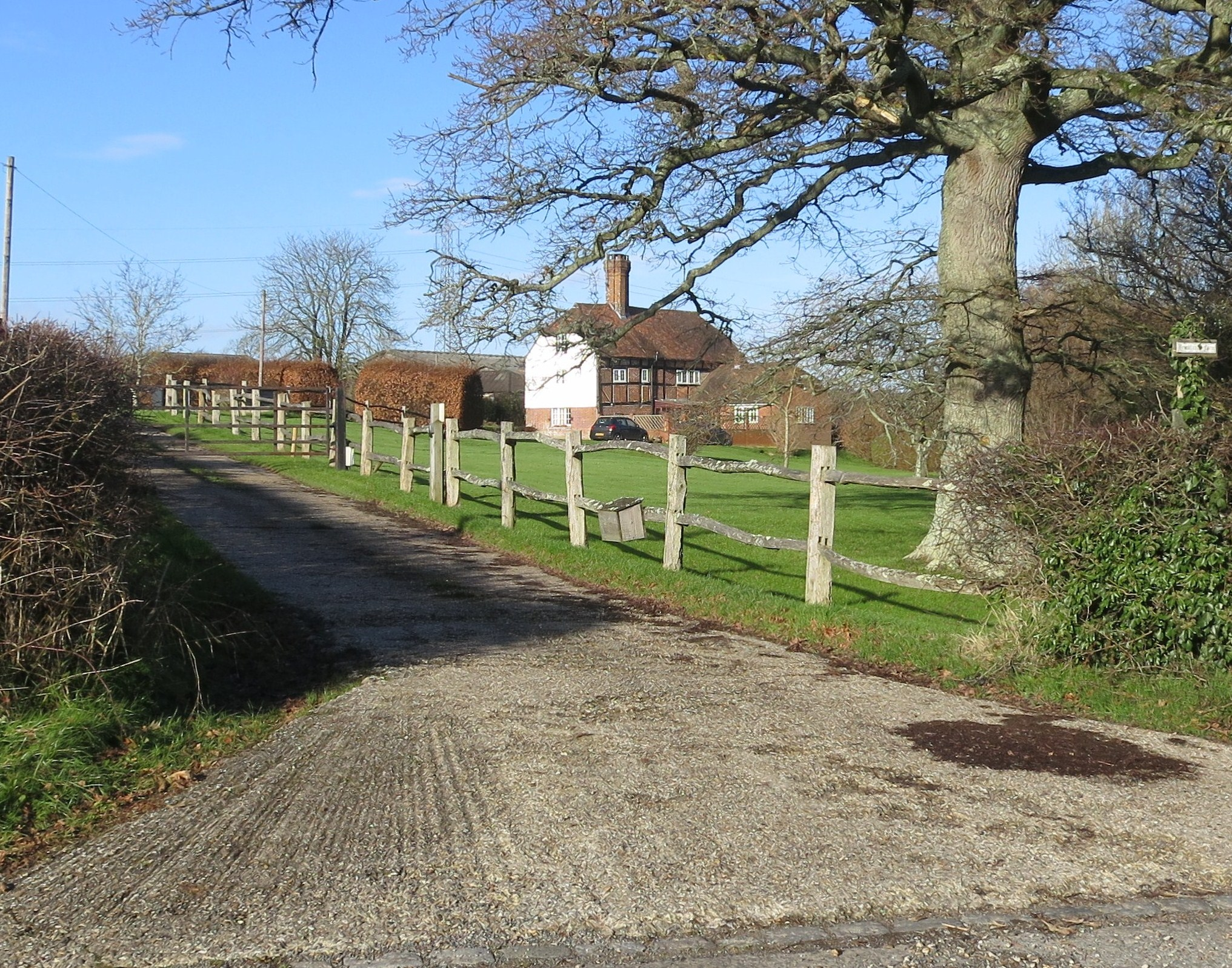
Brookland Farm

There are many century-old red brick villas and timber-framed cottages in the area such as Carston Farm, Brookland Farm (TQ 254 218), Coombe House, Dawes Farm, Red House, Partridge Farm, and Purveys Cottages are all ancient, with much timber framing. There has been an orchard at Old Mill Farm (TQ 250 232) for many years. Only some of it is still used in production of apples, a lot is derelict and some has been cleared. The derelict trees are now a home to much wildlife. The trees are hoary all over with lichen, tangled with bramble, and fallen fruit lies all around. In winter Fieldfares feed and in summer each year Nightingale return there.

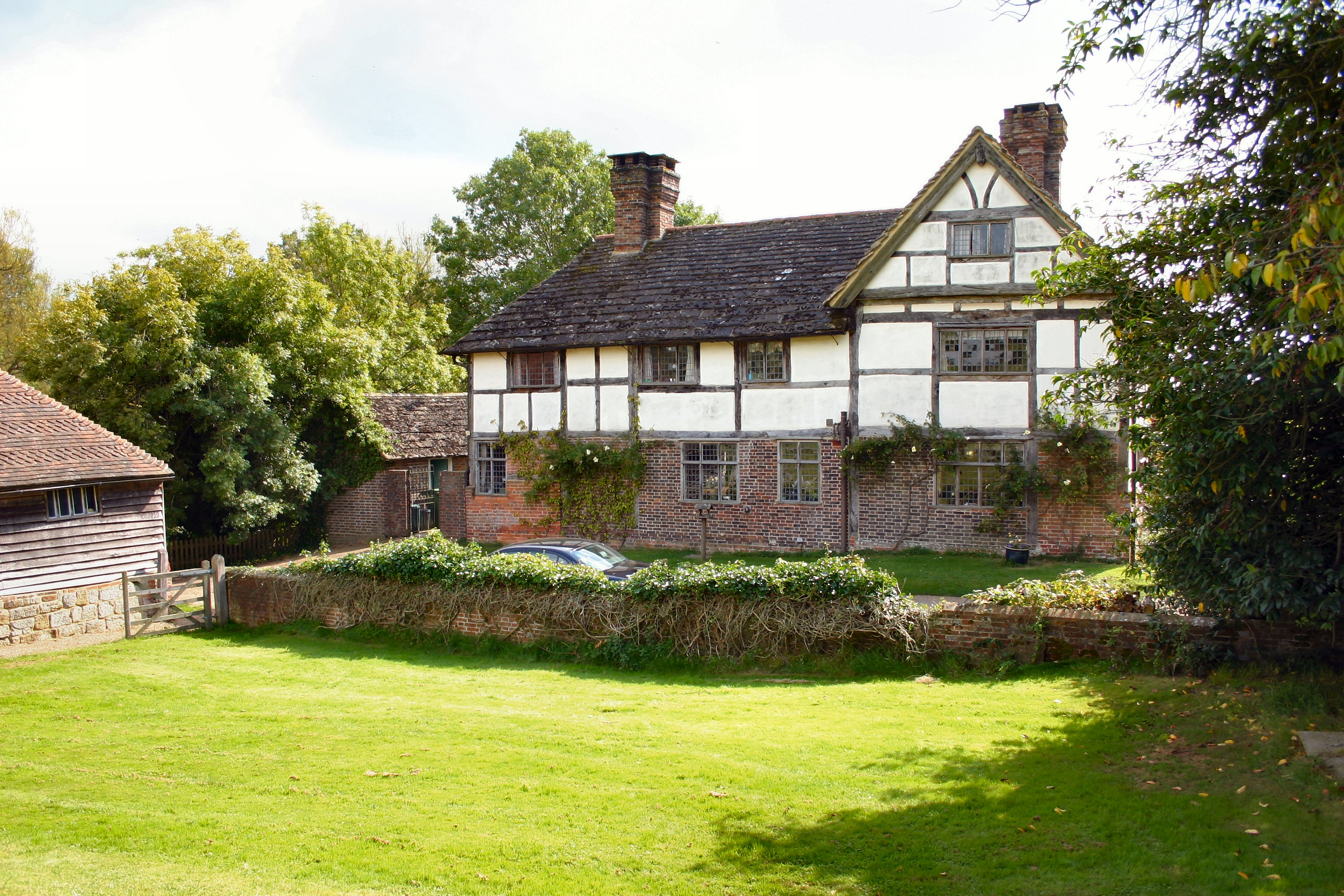
Old Mill House Farm

Just south of the A272 are the three mill ponds (TQ 264 221) of the lost Bolney Mill, surrounded by Church and Pond Woods, with their carpeting Bluebells. The wood at Purvey's Pit, (TQ 249 219), is ancient, with Early Dog Violet, Sweet Woodruff, orchids, Primroses and Bluebells. Just west,(TQ 247 219), the field appears to show old 'ridge and furrow' cultivation preserved under pasture and visible in the slanted sunshine of late afternoon. South again, actually in Twineham, is the giant Bolney substation (TQ 240 210), and its lines of pylons, now added by the underground Rampion wind farm cables from the Channel, off the Brighton coast.

West of Bolney, Nailard's Wood (TQ 255 255) has been coniferised, and has a sort-of messy builders yard at its heart (2012). "Piccadilly Wood" (TQ 254 242) is an off-road four wheel drive site. The woodland is just stage scenery for the cars. South of Nailard Wood is the Booker's Farm Vineyard (TQ 255 231) with footpaths through it. The vineyards are enclosed in 2m high fencing, and kissing gates let you through where the footpath crosses.

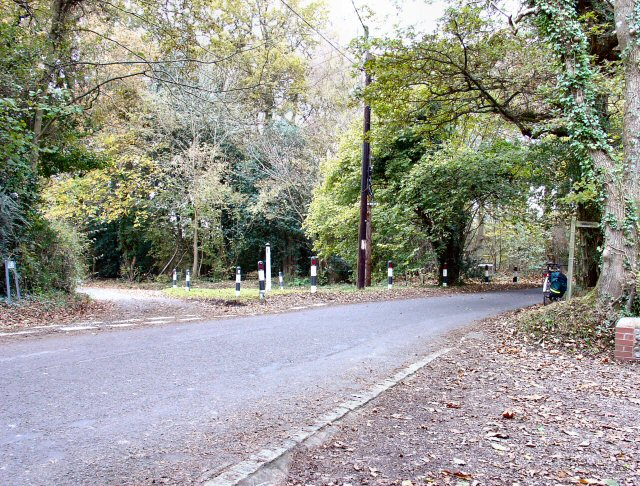
Junction of Spronkett's Lane and minor road to Smiths Cross

In the northwest corner of the parish is a tangle of ancient lanes, often holloways, with tiny greens at their intersections: Three Oaks Green (TQ 239 244), Bee Houses Green (TQ 241 241), Smith's Cross (TQ 232 234) and Spronketts Lane/Bull's Lane crossroads (TQ 241 234). Earwig Lane (TQ 242 248) is a green lane, best in autumn, very muddy in winter, between old wood banks and big trees, and with the woods of The Glen, to the east. The Glen (TQ 243 247) is a deep, humid, steep, long, tranquil, wild, varied and lovely gill. There is Shining Hookeria moss - that survivor of the Atlantic Age - and twenty-three ancient woodland indicator plants have been counted there, including Crab Apple and a Wild Daffodils, with Anemones and Bluebells everywhere. There are Sessile Oaks at the north end on both slopes, e.g. a three span giant (TQ 245 251). It is a place of Tawny Owls and Woodcock, fallen trees, tumbling banks, and a gurgling stream. Skunk Cabbage has escaped all the way down from stream side gardens at the north end (2012).

Spronketts Wood (TQ 244 236,) shrunken by clearance for poor fields and rich mansions, is overwhelmed in parts by Rhodi thickets, with tall ornamental conifers overtopping in places. The name is a corruption of 'spring cuts', i.e. coppice wood, and coppice survives, but there seems to be no big native timber. Opposite Colwood Park House, on the south side of Cross Colwood Lane, is the archaic Colwood Meadow (TQ 251 239). In June it has a huge display of Common Spotted Orchids, and in high summer it is dusted with the blue-mauve of Devils Bit Scabious (2012).

== Education ==
For pre-school education there is Bolney Under Fives Pre-School, for 2 to 5 year olds, and the Ark Nursery for 3 and 4 year olds, which follows the Early Years Curriculum.

Bolney Church of England Primary School serves 4–11 year olds. It was built in 1871 and has been expanded since, in 1996 and 2002.

== Governance ==
Bolney was previously in the constituency of Arundel and South Downs which was created in 1997. It was represented by two MPs, Howard Flight (Conservative, 1997–2005) and Nick Herbert (Conservative, 2005) It moved into the Mid Sussex constituency in 2010, represented by Nicholas Soames (Conservative) until 2019. The MP since 2019 is Mims Davies.

== Sport ==
Batchelor's Field is the village's main recreation ground.

- Bolney Cricket Club was founded in 1840. In 2003 a new pavilion was designed and built by players.
- Bolney Rovers Football Club plays in the Mid Sussex Football League, and there is also a veterans' team for the over 37s.
- Bolney Stoolball Club is a ladies' stoolball club that plays on Tuesday and Thursday evenings.
