= Harry Mileham =

English painter

Harry Robert Mileham
- Born: 1873
- Died: 1957 (aged 83–84)

Harry Robert Mileham was an English artist. He was born in 1873 and died in 1957.

He studied at Lambeth School of Art and Royal Academy Schools. During his studies in 1895, the artist received a gold medal and a Travelling Studentship at the Royal Academy Schools, with which he traveled to Italy to continue his artistic education. He experienced success in his professional career early, in 1899 he represented Britain at the Venice Biennale.

His work included oil painting and stained glass windows for various churches in Sussex, including work for Cox & Barnard. An exhibition collecting many of his works was held at the Leighton House, London and toured the United Kingdom in 1995.

== List of works ==
- Saint Francis of Assisi window at St. Mary's Church, Kelling, in Norfolk
