= Church reordering =

Church reordering refers to the rearrangement and adaption of churches to accommodate changes in religious practice. More recently it has been used to describe the introduction of secular uses in under-used places of worship, while retaining their primary purpose as places of worship.

Twenty-first century church re-ordering involves the transformation of under-used places of worship by the introduction of secular uses, while retaining their purpose as places of worship.

== History ==
Church conversions, where large under-used religious buildings have been transformed into other uses, are nothing new. The impressive Lincoln College Library in Oxford (formerly the city's baroque church of All Saints), the spacious OAP's Day Centre contained within the shell of York's Church of St Sampson, and the world-famous music performance space at St John's, Smith Square in Westminster, are all English exemplars which pre-date the reordering movement.

In 1977, London's Victoria and Albert Museum mounted a major exhibition entitled 'Change or Decay', curated by its then Director Sir Roy Strong. Its central theme was that Britain had too many places of worship and that, because of their architectural significance, many needed to be saved from closure and demolition. An accompanying book, by Marcus Binney (co-founder of the conservation pressure group Save Britain's Heritage) and the architect Peter Burnham, illustrated the plight of many of these threatened church buildings, in an era when attrition was severe. Between 1970 and 2004 the Church of England (CofE) closed 1,630 of its churches; some 85 of these, which were listed buildings, were subsequently demolished. The national attendance records maintained by the CofE show that fewer than 2% of the population are regular churchgoers. Church reordering advocates believe that broader community-based uses of under-used churches could turn the tide.

Though the technique of church reordering has been embraced by many faiths, it is the Anglican Communion which leads the way. In England, there are just over 16,000 'active' church buildings, with 14,500 of them owned by the CofE, which as of 2013 spends £100 million annually on their maintenance. Some 12,000 of these churches are 'listed' by English Heritage as being of architectural significance, with around 4,000 now classified as being Grade I (the highest category).

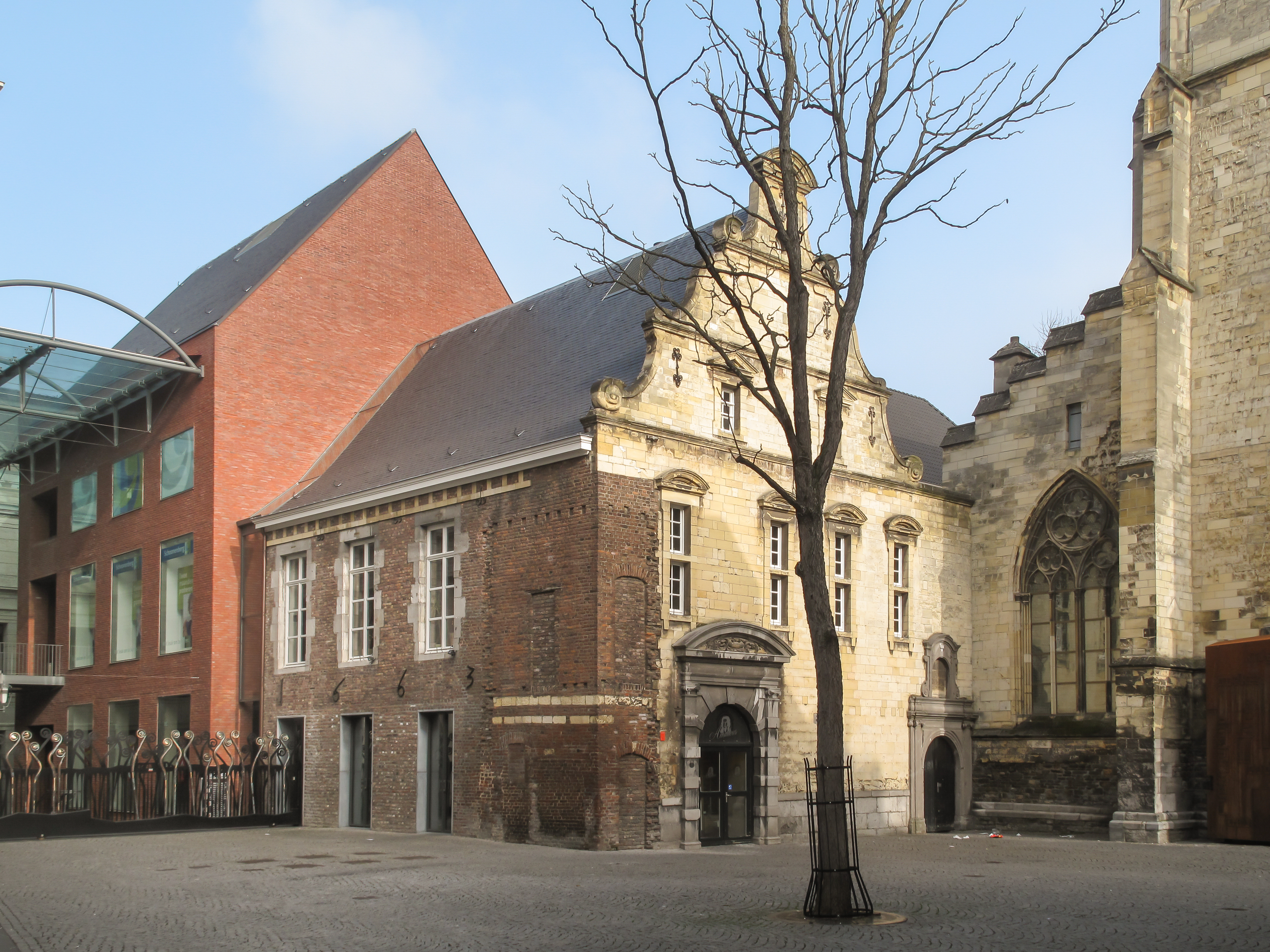
Selexyz bookstore in Maastricht; a conversion from a 13th-century Dominican church

Other European countries have tackled the problem of what to do with their unwanted places of worship rather more radically. In the Dutch town of Arnhem, the former church of St Joseph is now an indoor skatepark, while in Maastricht the city's 13th century Dominican Church has been converted (by the Amsterdam-based architects Merckx + Girod) into the award-winning Selexyz bookstore.

Deconsecration - where a church building's religious use is officially removed - is a drastic step which many faiths are reluctant to take. In the five years 2007-12, 123 CofE church buildings were deconsecrated and put to other uses, residential being the largest (22%). A further 29 were demolished and six were transferred to the Churches Conservation Trust (CCT) for repair and preservation. Founded in 1968, the CCT currently cares for 341 English churches. Its reordering schemes range from the cultural centre in the King's Lynn, Norfolk church of St Nicholas, to Circomedia's award-winning training school for aspiring circus trapeze artists in the Bristol church of St Paul's.

In general, the Roman Catholic hierarchy is opposed to 'mixed-use' conversions, preferring to see its under-used consecrated buildings closed rather than becoming involved with non-worship activities. Nevertheless, several churches in Quebec, Canada, have moved to mixed uses. Montreal's Church of the Gesù, while still an active church, is best known as a cultural centre and concert hall, while in rural Quebec, several churches have been partially repurposed, for example by converting the nave into community space but preserving the chancel behind a movable wall which can be opened for services.

Richard Giles' Re-pitching the tent is now widely regarded as the definitive guide to reordering, while the American historian Katherine French's study of community life in medieval England (The People of the Parish) reveals that activities other than conventional worship would frequently be encountered in many town churches. People might met to trade, complete business deals or consult lawyers. Scriveners were usually on hand, on the lookout for work. It is a return to this medieval concept of the church being 'community-based' which is at the heart of the reordering movement.

In Britain, national awards schemes and conferences have helped to promote the reordering movement. In 2008, the City of London's Mercers Livery Company launched its 'Village Church for Village Life' award, with a first prize of £10,000. The winner was the parish church of St Phillip & St James at Newton St Philip in Somerset. In October 2012, at Lambeth Palace (the London residence of the CofE's Leader, the Archbishop of Canterbury), a national conference entitled 'New work in churches' also focussed on church reordering.

== Examples ==
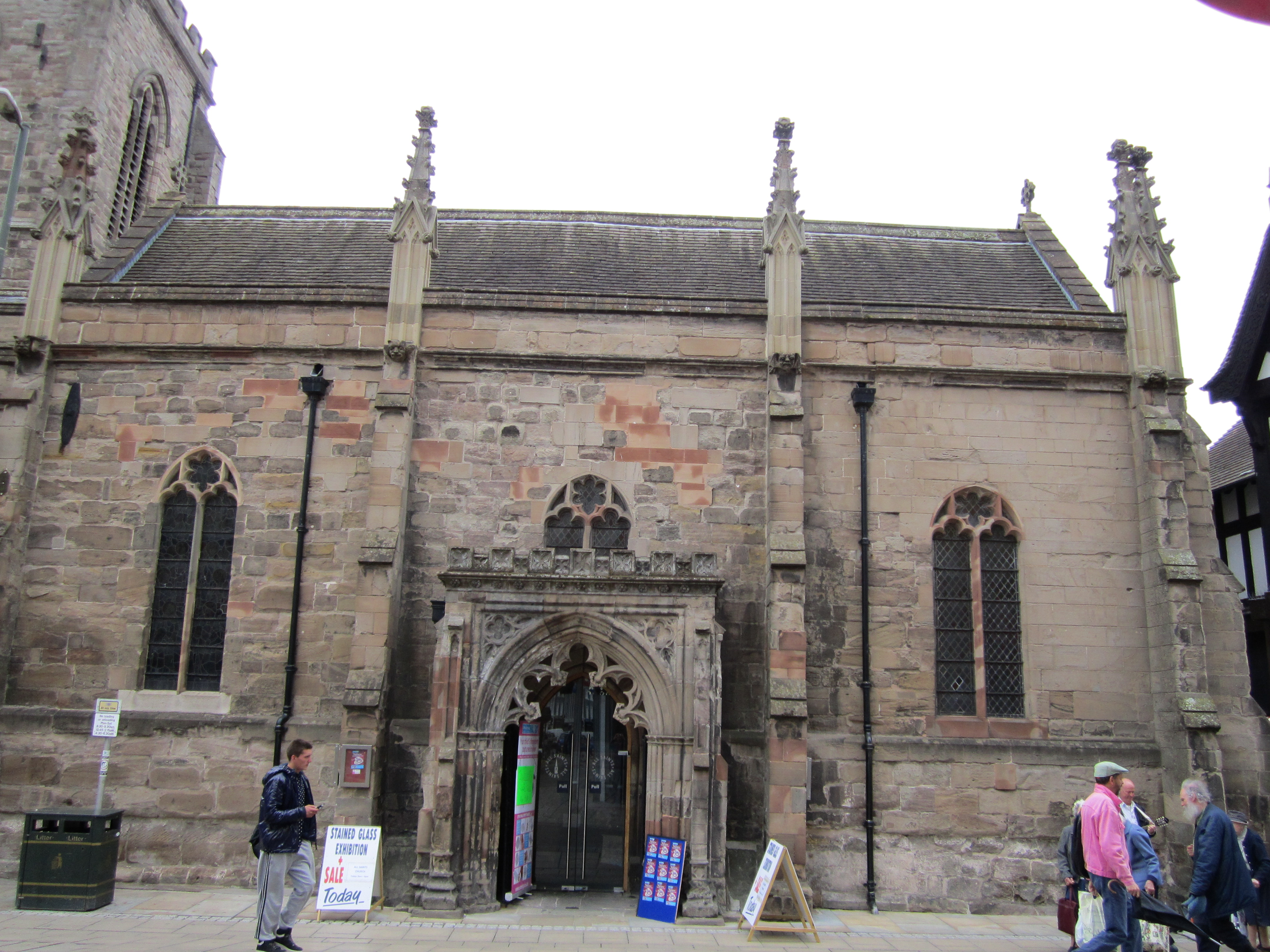
All Saints Church, Hereford

One of the most successful church reordering schemes in England is the award-winning conversion of All Saints in the West Midlands cathedral city of Hereford, completed in 1999 and designed by local architect Rod Robinson. All Saints is the oldest parish church in Hereford (parts of its interior date back to the late-12th century), yet in 1991 it came perilously close to being closed and deconsecrated. The solution to the dwindling congregations and spiralling maintenance costs was to 'insert' a café at the west end of the nave, linked to a new mezzanine eating area 'suspended' above the south arcade, and to sacrifice the church's South Chapel, which is now available for commercial lettings such as arts and crafts exhibitions. Both the central nave and chancel, as well as the Lady Chapel, are retained as areas of worship. A new vestry, formed from curved sheets of frosted glass, completes the transformation. An indication of the success of this radical reordering scheme, which cost £1.7M, is that around 2,000 people pass through Café @ All Saints every week, and church worship attendances have quadrupled.

The Diocese of Hereford has played a leading role in propagating the ideas of church reordering right across Herefordshire, where 90% of the county's 425 churches are listed. A dedicated team within the Diocese Office has overseen or advised on 40 church reordering exercises, several of which have won national architectural awards. Among these are a community centre (shared by five neighbouring parishes) in the 12th-century church of St Andrew's at Bridge Sollers and St Peter's at Peterchurch, where a village lending library, a children's play area and a space for music recitals have all been seamlessly woven into the fabric of this little Norman church. The latter project won the prestigious national ACE/RIBA design award in 2012. Both conversions are the work of the Herefordshire practice Communion Design.
