= Worth Forest =

Forest and Site of Special Scientific Interest in Crawley, West Sussex

Coordinates: 51.083°N 0.154°W

- Site of Special Scientific Interest
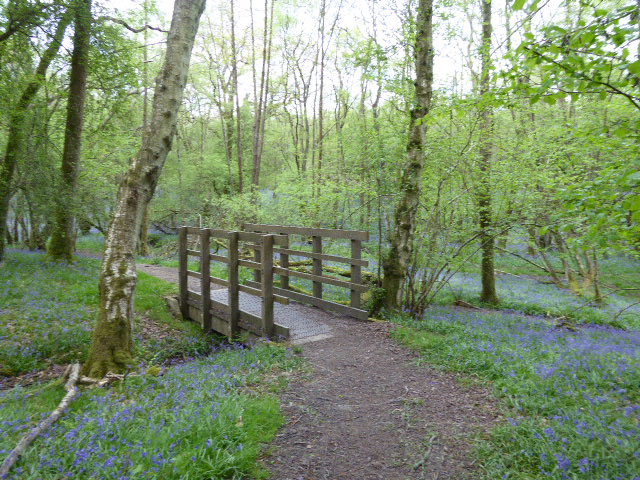
- Location of Worth Forest.
- Area of search: West Sussex
- Grid reference: TQ 294 331
- Interest: Biological
- Area: 43.8 hectares (108 acres)
- Notification date: 1986
- Location map: Magic Map

Worth Forest is a 43.8-hectare (108-acre) biological Site of Special Scientific Interest south of Crawley in West Sussex. It is in the High Weald Area of Outstanding Natural Beauty.

This ancient wood is in a ghyll formed by a stream which has eroded soft sandstone. The poorly drained valley bottom has carpets of Sphagnum while the upper slopes are dry and have a diverse community of mosses, liverworts and lichens.

The site is private land but it is crossed by public footpaths.
