= Sussex Marble =

Sussex Marble is a fossiliferous freshwater limestone material which is prevalent in the Weald Clay of parts of Kent, East Sussex and West Sussex in southeast England. It is also called Petworth Marble, Bethersden Marble or Laughton Stone in relation to villages where it was quarried, and another alternative name is winklestone. It is referred to as "marble" as it polishes very well, although it is not a true marble, geologically speaking, as it has not been subject to metamorphism. The matrix is made up of the shells of freshwater gastropods and viviparus winkles, similar to but larger than those making Purbeck Marble. The pale calcified remains of the shells are in a matrix of darker material. West Sussex has a good concentration of thin layers of Sussex Marble; beds typically measure no more than 1 foot (0.30 m) thick. There are often two beds—the lower formed of smaller-shelled gastropods than the upper—with a layer of calcareous clay between them.

== Historical use ==
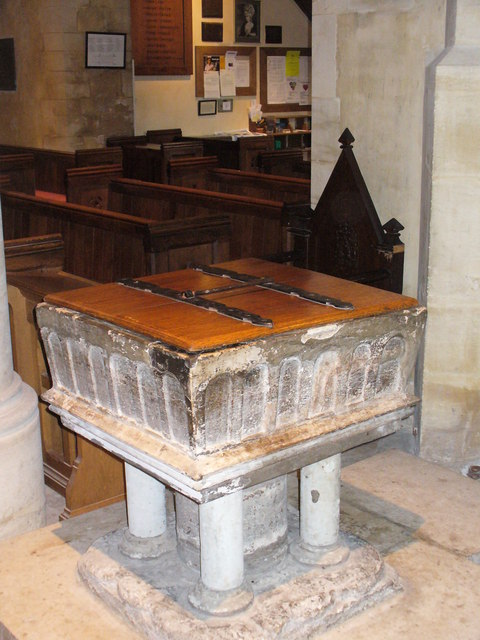
The Norman font in St Michael's Church in Mickleham, Surrey is made of Sussex marble

The Weald of Kent, near the Sussex border, was the centre of quarrying activity, as the material was most prevalent there. Yeomen who owned their own farms were usually involved. Bethersden village is surrounded by "small reed-filled and tree-fringed ponds" formed by the filling over time of old marble workings. In the area, the Perpendicular Gothic towers of the parish churches of Biddenden, Headcorn, Smarden and Tenterden, pavements and paths in Staplehurst, and the Dering Arms, an inn next to Pluckley railway station, all use the material.

In the early 19th century, Sussex Marble quarried at Petworth rivalled many of the stones which were routinely imported from the continent, in both beauty and quality. A kind of shell marble occurring in the Wealden clay, its quarrying was concentrated on the Egremont estate at Kirdford and there are accounts of the industry at nearby Plaistow. It was used in several chimney pieces at Petworth House, and in Edward the Confessor's Chapel in Westminster Abbey the tombs of Edward III and of Richard II and his Queen are both in "grey Petworth Marble". At Canterbury Cathedral the Archbishop's chair is an entire piece of the stone. Embellishment of the nave of Chichester Cathedral is in both Purbeck and Petworth Marbles; the latter was used for the pillars of the upper triforium which even then showed "some decomposition of the shelly particles". Church fittings such as altars, rails, piers and floors have been made from the material, as have memorial tablets and parts of tombs. Sussex churches with Sussex Marble fonts include St George's at Trotton, St Peter's at Ardingly and St Mary's at West Chiltington. The lychgate at St Mary Magdalene's Church, Bolney, given to the church in 1905, stands on a base of Sussex Marble.

== Present day ==
As the material is not in regular supply, much restoration of earlier Sussex Marble work takes place using Purbeck Marble, which is considered a more stable stone. An example of this practice occurred as early as 1870, when the font at St Margaret's Church in West Hoathly had to be restored but the original Sussex Marble, quarried in Petworth, had run out.

The industry and workings are long gone although small new rural development around the Surrey/Sussex border occasionally brings up new seams of the stone. The qualities of the material are being rediscovered through British sculptors like Jon Edgar who, after a gap of nearly 200 years, are having to re-discover the ways of working it, its strengths and weaknesses.
