= Twineham =

Village and parish in West Sussex, England

Coordinates: 50°57′51″N 0°12′46″W

- Village and civil parish
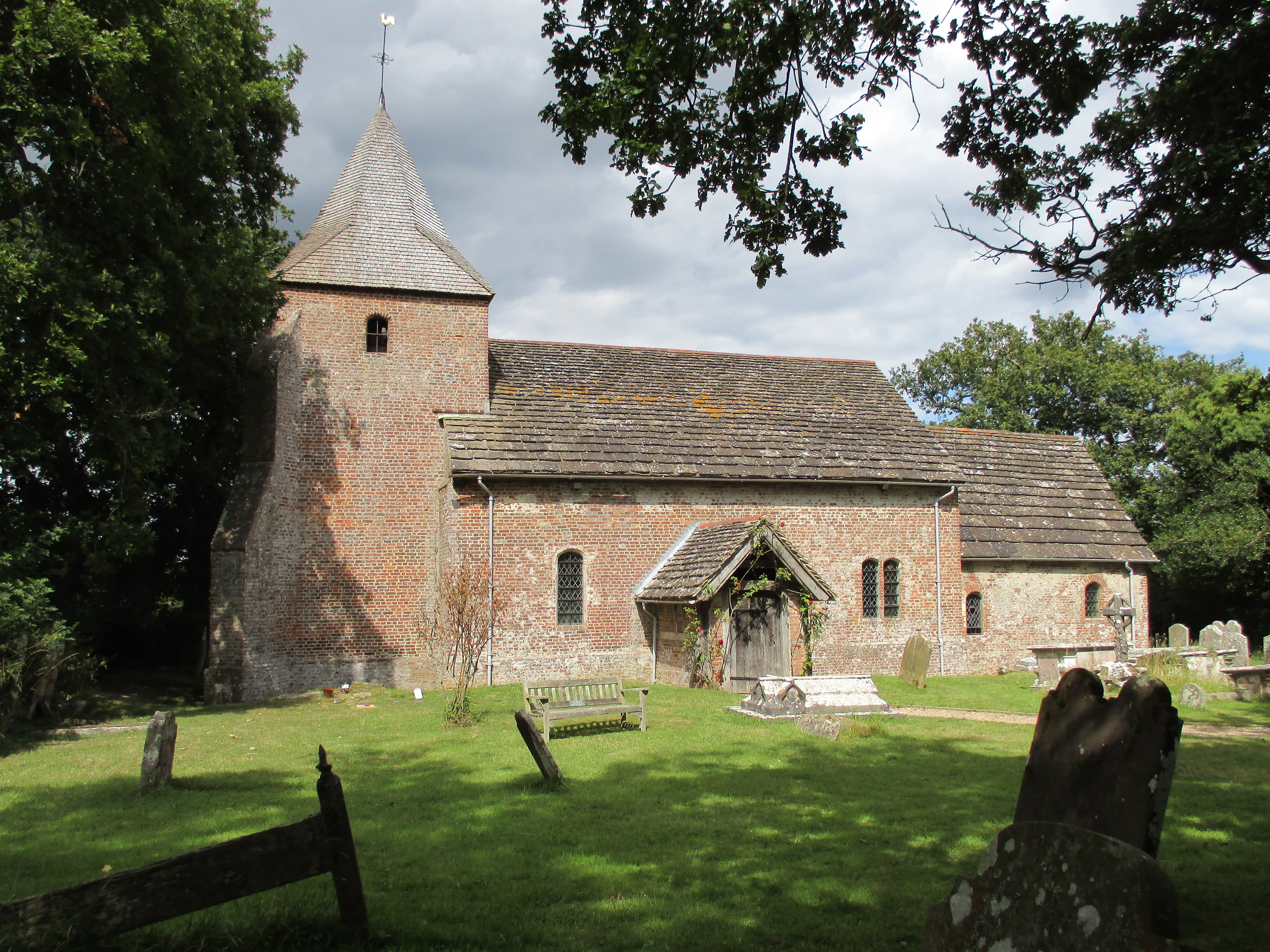
- Twineham church

- Location within West Sussex
- Area: 7.84 km^{2} (3.03 sq mi)
- Population: 271 2001 Census; 306 (2011 Census)
  - Density: 35/km^{2} (91/sq mi)
- OS grid reference: TQ256198
  - London: 37 miles (60 km) N
- Civil parish: Twineham
- District: Mid Sussex
- Shire county: West Sussex
- Region: South East
- Country: England
- Sovereign state: United Kingdom
- Post town: HAYWARDS HEATH
- Postcode district: RH17
- Dialling code: 01444
- Police: Sussex
- Fire: West Sussex
- Ambulance: South East Coast
- UK Parliament: Mid Sussex
- Website: Twineham Parish Council

Twineham is a village and civil parish in the Mid Sussex District of West Sussex, England. It is located eight kilometres (5.0 miles) to the west of Burgess Hill. The civil parish covers an area of 784 hectares (1,940 acres) In the 2001 census 271 people lived in 100 households, of whom 139 were economically active. The 2011 Census population was 306.

The village centre has no pub, post office or shop. There is only the church and the school.

The hamlet of Hickstead lies at the eastern end of the parish, on the A23 road, 2.7 mi (4.3 km) west of Burgess Hill.

== History ==
In Anglo-Saxon times this area was a royal manor.

This flat waterland geography of the Adur's fingered streams is a land of hamms, that word that the Saxons used to denote long, reedy brooks and meadows, wetlands hemmed in by higher ground, or land hemmed in by marsh^{:46} and there are places like Twineham (meaning "place between the streams", recorded as Tuineam in the late 11th century, Twyne in the 13th century and Twynym in the 15th century), and Wyndham (now Wineham). The parish embraces the lands between the western and eastern arms of the Adur, and it embraces the confluence of the eastern Adur and the Herrings (or Heron) Stream.

There is another forgotten geography too, that stripes this landscape in long south–north parallels: the geography of the drove roads. Probably early medieval, maybe some earlier still, these were the wide ways whereby the cultivators of the rich lands of the coastal plain, the Downs, and the under-down spring line, brought their swine for the autumn pannage in the Wealden woods, and their cattle for the lush grass of the meadowlands. Some of these droves are plain to see like the Wineham Lane. Others have faded greatly into the landscape, though hedgelines and old boundaries mark them out, like that going north from High Cross through Twineham Place, and on to Spronketts Wood north of the A272.

=== Later history ===
In 1911, the village started to get its piped water supply from the Burgess Hill Water Company. In 1928, the roads were surfaced, and electricity came to the village in 1936. The village of Twineham has never had its own pub, although there are two pubs in the parish of Twineham.

== Notable buildings and areas ==
Around Twineham is a level, open countryside of meandering lush streams and large fields, a bit like the best of old Norfolk in the well-timbered Weald. Along the streams, the sounds of yellowhammers and reed warblers in spring do their best to compete with the low roar of the London Road. A tawny owl made it its home (2016) and hunts along the thick hedgerows and low scrub much as a barn owl would.

=== Buildings ===
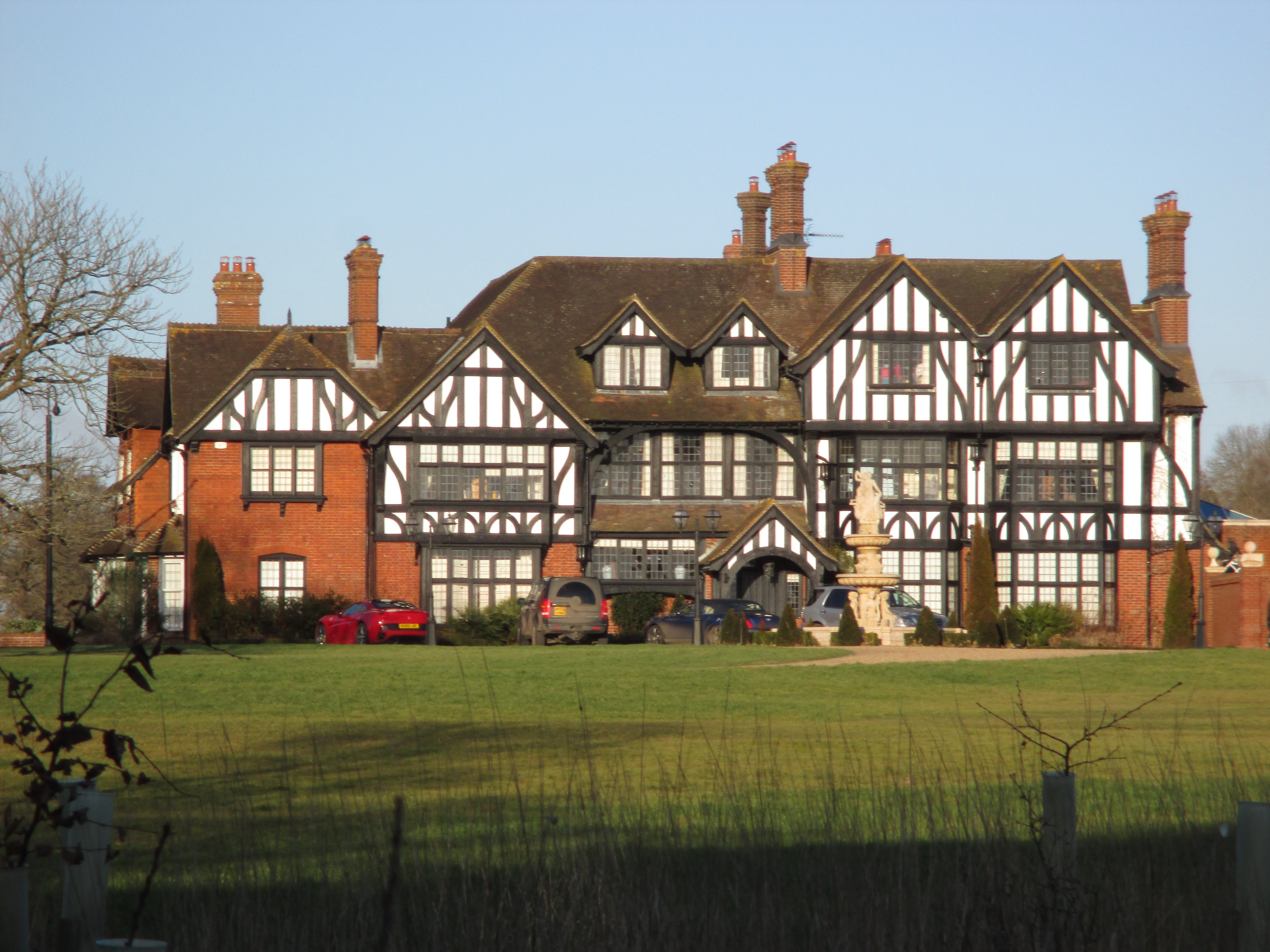
Twineham Grange

Twineham civil parish contains 21 listed buildings. Of these, one is Grade I, two are Grade II* and the remaining 18 buildings are Grade II.

Farms like Twineham Place have big spreads of modern industrial-scale shedding, whilst the derelict battery egg production sheds of Whiteoaks Farm (TQ 260 180), on Reeds Lane, have now been replaced by a landscaped industrial estate. There is still a fair amount of cultivated ground and farmed land, relative to much of the Low Weald.

==== The Parish Church of St Peter ====
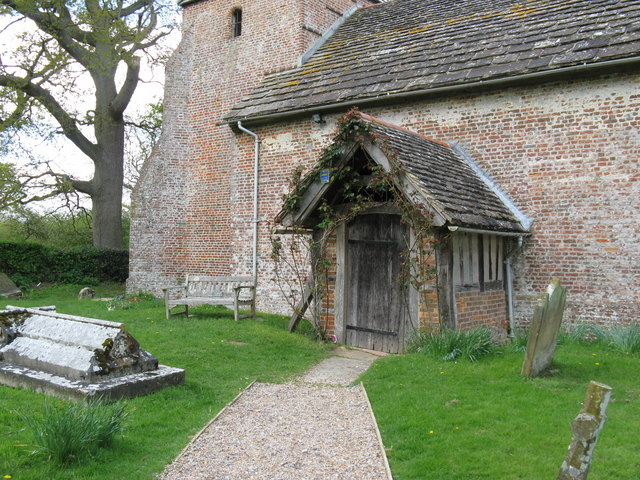
Porch at St Peters Church

The Parish Church of St Peter is a Grade I listed building. and was built, about 1516, using local brick. The first of that material in mid Sussex. It is likely to have replaced a wooden church. Inside, some of the aisle slabs are of fossil winklestone, from a Sussex marble band that outcrops roughly along, but just south of, Gratten Lane. The pulpit and squire's pew have the finest carving: the former Jacobean, the latter Elizabethan. Until recently there was a Householder's Pew with the old farm names gilded upon it.

==== Slipe ====
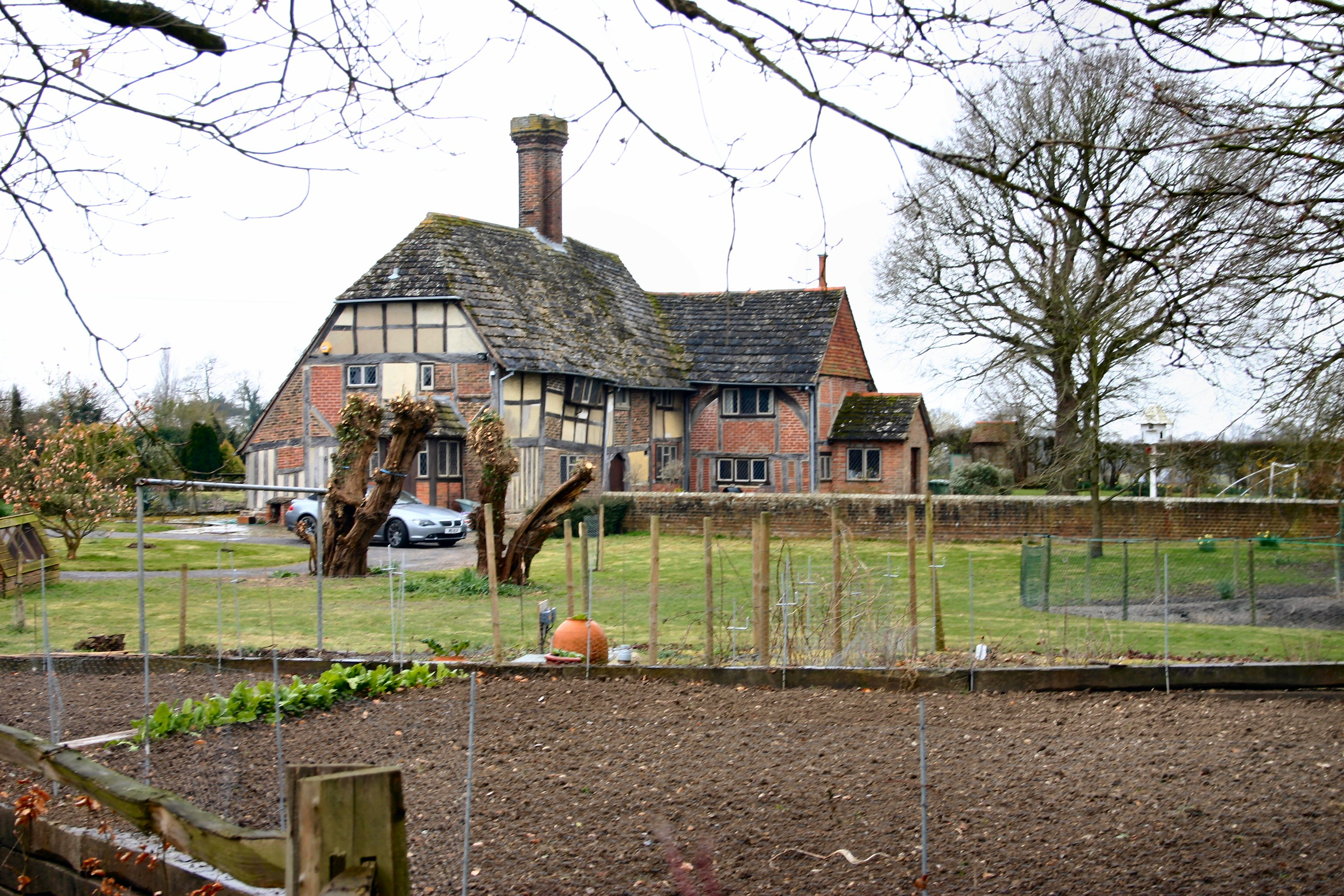
Slipe

Slipe is a Grade II* listed building and a former farmhouse, originally a 15th-century timber-framed open hall with a solar wing, modified in the 16th century and restored in the 1920s and late 1940s.

==== Hickstead Place ====
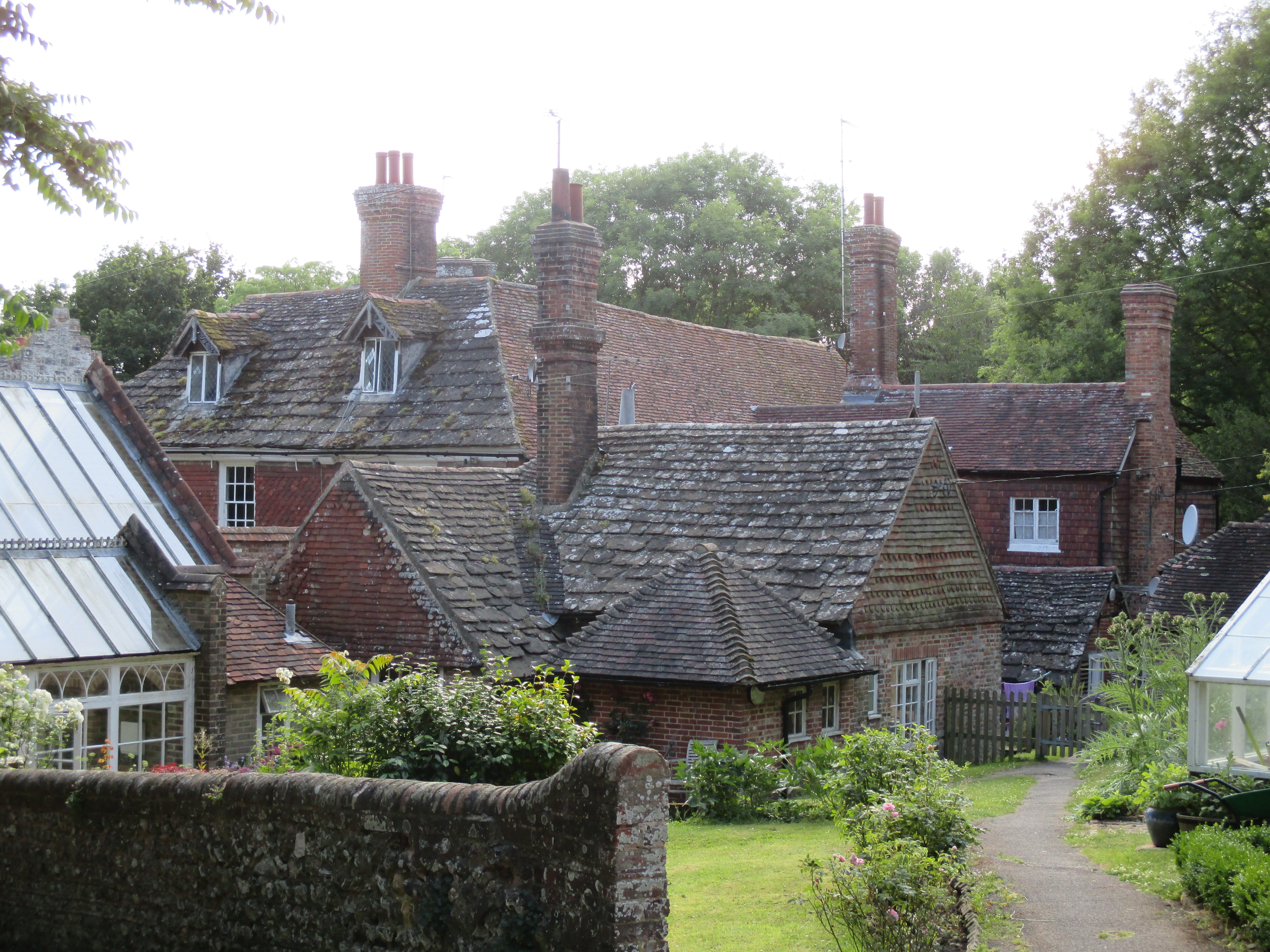
Hickstead Place

Hickstead Place is a Grade II* listed building and a timber-framed house of different periods, altered from the 18th century onwards; the oldest portions are 15th century.

==== All England Jumping Course at Hickstead ====
Part of the All England Jumping Course at Hickstead is located within the parish; however, the International Arena itself, and public access to the course from the A23, are outside the parish, to the south, in the civil parish of Hurstpierpoint and Sayers Common.

==== War Memorial ====
Twineham's War Memorial is a Grade II* listed building . The National Heritage List for England describes it as 'an elegant and well-proportioned example of a Celtic cross memorial displaying good quality materials and fine craftsmanship'.

=== Rivers ===
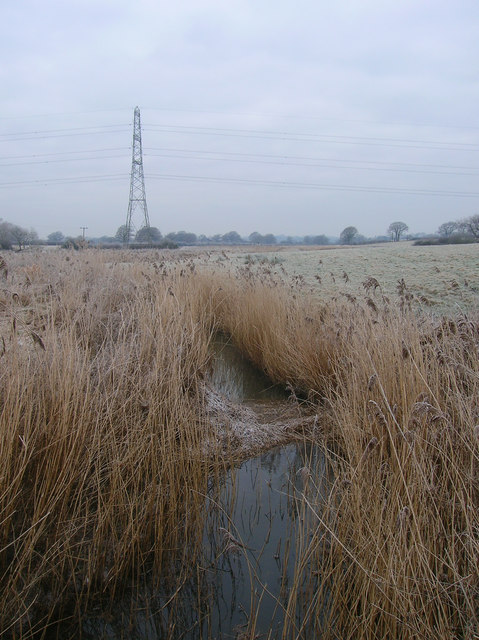
Herrings Stream

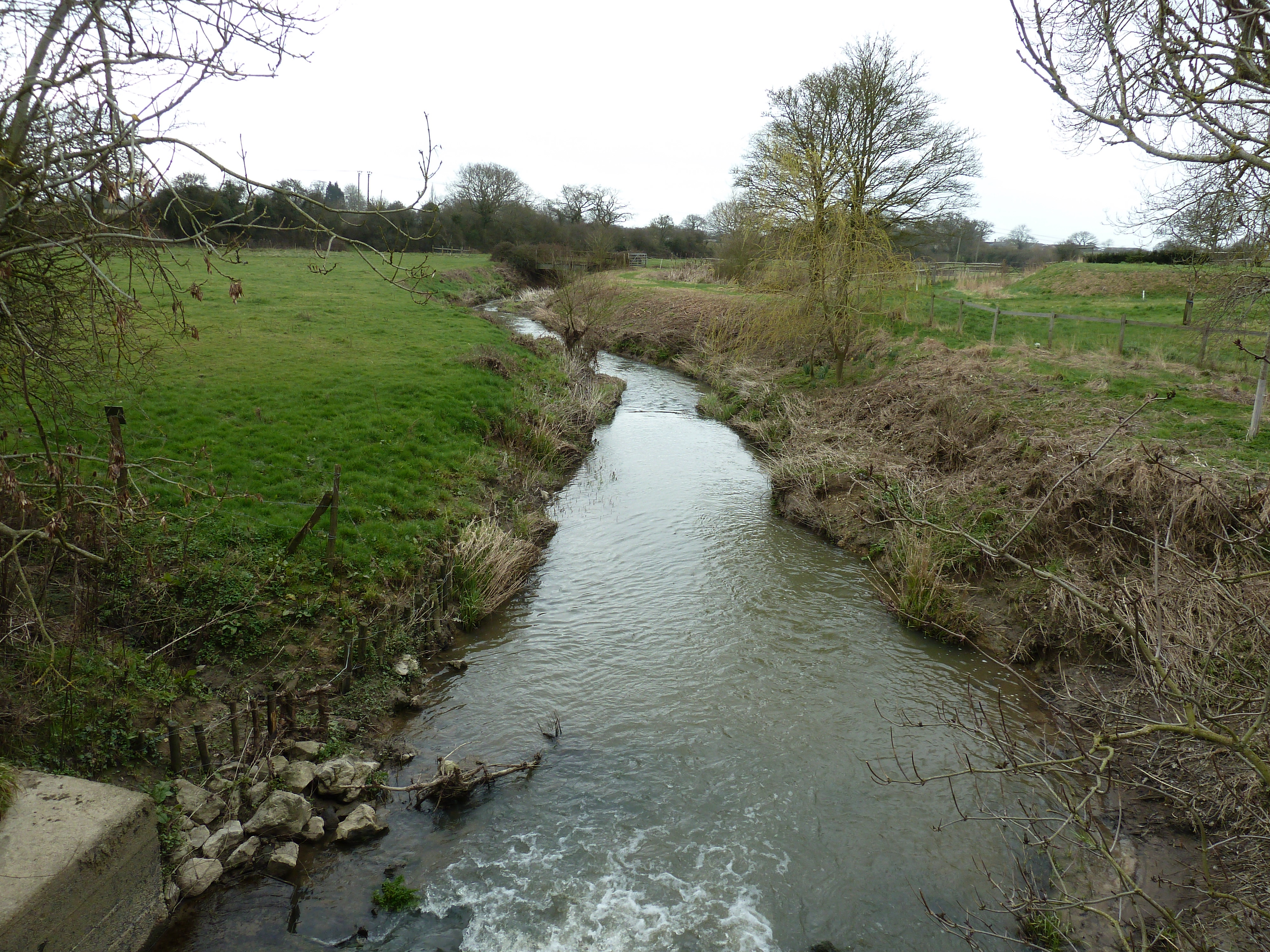
River Adur tributary flowing under Hooker's Bridge

The eastern River Adur meets Herrings Stream at Twineham (TQ 239 193). The river then continues to the west of Henfield, where it meets the western Adur to reach the sea at Shoreham-by-Sea. The streams are rich in dragon and damselflies; from Hooker's Bridge, (TQ 255 203), along the little Adur west to its confluence with the Herrings Stream (TQ 240 196) and back east to Herrings Bridge (TQ 254 193) there are emperors, chasers, banded demioselles, and much more.

At the confluence the Reed and Greater Pond Sedge beds are extensive, and noisy with the discordant grating of bands of reed bunting flocks and reed warblers in spring. The primroses are plentiful along Gratten Lane, e.g. (TQ 245 192), with long views in all directions. At Bob's Lane (TQ 246 205) a pairs of barn owls forage the fields, hedge lines and wood edges. There is ancient flowers such as early dog violet, sweet woodruff, orchids and bluebells.

=== Hickstead ===
The hamlet of Hickstead, lie at the eastern end of the parish. At Hickstead, the Herrings Stream cuts between the Show Jumping Course and Hickstead Place. West of the Course, the Stream passes a wooded medieval moated site (TQ 262 195), and several old oaks. The Herrings Stream has relatively good bankside access from Hickstead east to the A273, Eylesford Bridge.

== Governance ==
=== Civil parish ===
Twineham Parish Council has five parish councillors. The Parish Council holds six planned meetings a year; additional meetings may be called to discuss planning applications. Meetings are held at Twineham School.

The Localism Act 2011 gives town or parish councils the ability to produce their own neighbourhood plan. The Twineham Neighbourhood Plan was published on 24 March 2016. The plan informs development decisions, and helps influence the type, quality and location of that development.

=== Non-metropolitan district ===
Twineham civil parish is in Bolney Ward of the non-metropolitan district of Mid Sussex; the ward returns one councillor to Mid Sussex District Council.

The responsibilities of district councils include local planning, housing, local highways, building, environmental health, and refuse collection.

=== Non-metropolitan county ===
Twineham civil parish is in the Hurstpierpoint and Bolney electoral division of the non-metropolitan county of West Sussex. The division returns one councillor to West Sussex County Council.

The functions of county councils including education, transport, strategic planning, fire services, consumer protection, refuse disposal, social services and libraries.

=== Westminster constituency ===
Twineham civil parish is now in the Mid Sussex constituency. Prior to 2010 it was in the Arundel and South Downs constituency.

== Education ==
Twineham Church of England Primary School is a voluntary controlled school catering for Reception to Year 6 pupils (aged 4 to 11). There are no nursery classes. The school has capacity for 105 pupils. The school's Ofsted rating is ‘Good’. It was last inspected on 17 November 2022. Good schools are inspected around once every four years; the next Ofsted inspection is therefore due in 2026. The school is located in Church Lane, Twineham, adjacent to St Peter's Church. It was opened in 1864, with provision for 80 children. Originally a tithe barn, the building has various additions, the latest in 2009.

== Sport ==
Twineham & Wineham Cricket Club, founded in 1893, still play at the village's recreation ground. The club plays friendly Sunday matches both at home and away against local village teams between the end of April and the end of September. The club was revived in the early 1980s after some years in the wilderness. In the late 1980s, its membership was boosted by the arrival of players from the recently defunct Warninglid team and the influx of a number of players from Brighton.

== Notable residents ==
Douglas Bunn (1928 – 2009), showjumping entrepreneur and businessman, lived in the parish, near Hickstead. He was godfather to model Jodie Kidd, who married entrepreneur Aidan Butler at St Peter's Church, Twineham on 10 September 2005.
