= List of places of worship in Adur =

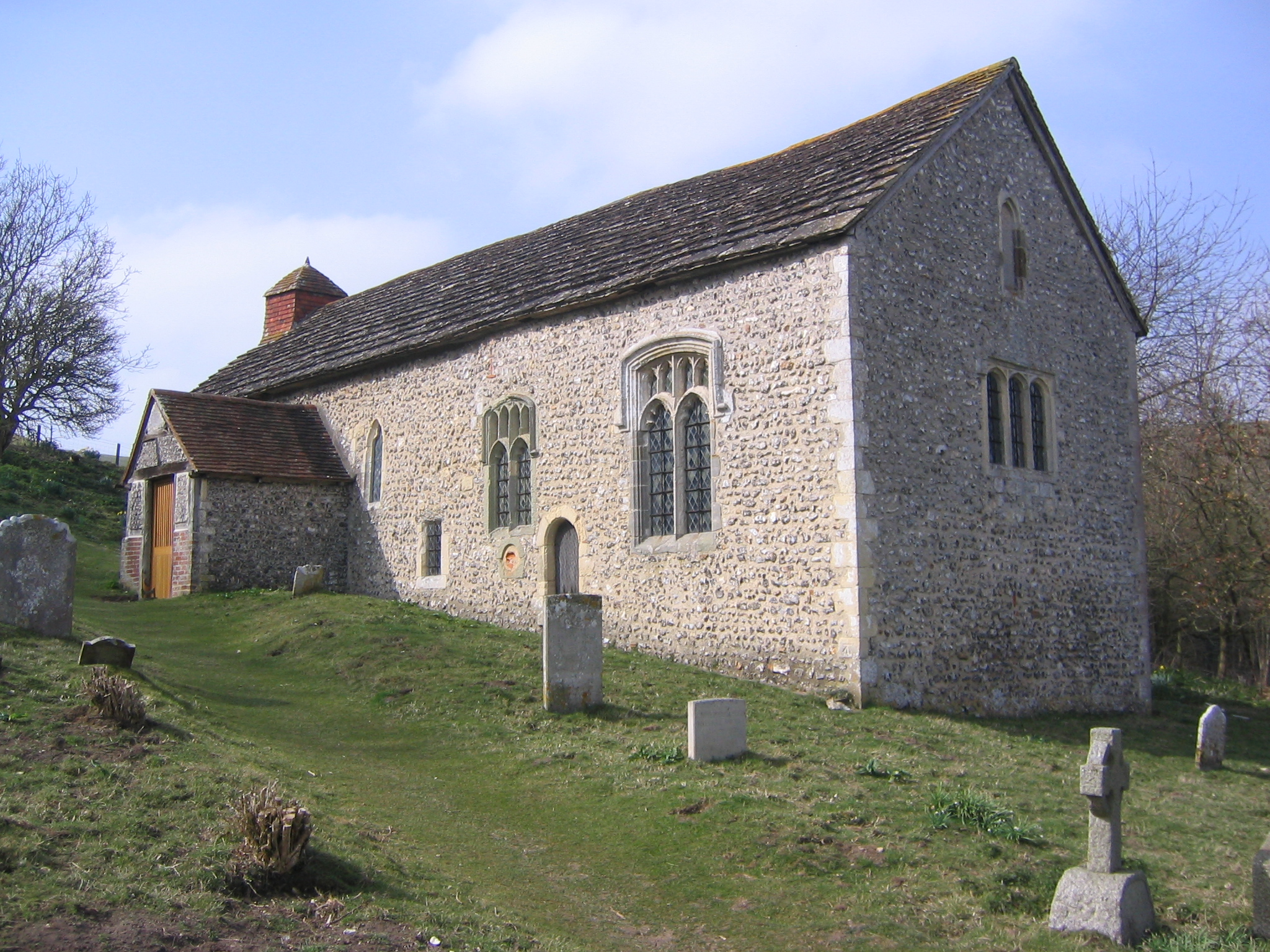
The 11th-century church at Coombes is a Grade I listed building.

The district of Adur, one of seven local government districts in the English county of West Sussex, has 26 extant churches and other places of worship, and a further five former churches that are no longer in religious use. The southern part of the district forms part of the Brighton/Worthing/Littlehampton conurbation, and almost all of the churches are in the towns and villages within this continuous built-up area. The rural northern part of the district has one ancient church that is still in use, and another former chapel that served a now deserted medieval village. Many Christian denominations are represented, but followers of other religions must travel outside the area to worship.

Seven of Adur's extant places of worship, and two former churches, have been awarded listed status. A building is defined as "listed" when it is placed on a statutory register of buildings of "special architectural or historic interest" in accordance with the Planning (Listed Buildings and Conservation Areas) Act 1990. The Department for Culture, Media and Sport, a Government department, is responsible for this; English Heritage, a non-departmental public body, acts as an agency of the department to administer the process and advise the department on relevant issues. There are three grades of listing status. Grade I, the highest, is defined as being of "exceptional interest"; Grade II* is used for "particularly important buildings of more than special interest"; and Grade II, the lowest, is used for buildings of "special interest".

By the 11th century, the area now covered by Adur district had several small settlements, each with their own church. Although some have been restored and altered, most ancient structural work and internal features remain. These include an anchorite's cell (where a hermit was walled up for life), a rare series of wall paintings, an example of the Tapsel gate design found only in Sussex, and a "Rhenish helm" four-gabled tower cap that is unique in England.

== Location ==
Adur located within West Sussex

Adur, which has an area of 4,180 hectares (10,300 acres), is a coastal district between the South Downs and the English Channel. The city of Brighton and Hove lies to the east, and Worthing is to the west. The River Adur, from which the district takes its name, flows from north to south and cuts the area in two. In the Saxon and Norman eras, villages developed on both sides: Southwick, Kingston Buci and Shoreham in the east; Lancing and Sompting in the west. Each had its own ancient church. As the settlements grew, they merged into a continuous urban area and absorbed hamlets such as Upper Cokeham, Lower Cokeham and Fishersgate. Housing spread on to the lower slopes of the Downs, but little extended north of the Old Shoreham Road (built as the main east–west route through the area in the 18th century). The A27 trunk road now forms the northern limit of the urban area.

Churches had been founded at Southwick, Kingston Buci, Old Shoreham, Sompting, the downland village of Coombes and the now abandoned village of Old Erringham at the time of the Domesday Survey in 1086. New Shoreham's church existed by the end of the 11th century, and Lancing had one by the 12th century.

== Religious affiliation ==
According to the 2021 United Kingdom census, 64,544 lived in Adur district. Of these, 43.13% identified themselves as Christian, 1.3% were Muslim, 0.42% were Buddhist, 0.39% were Jewish, 0.32% were Hindu, 0.05% were Sikh, 0.61% followed another religion, 47.86% claimed no religious affiliation and 5.92% did not state their religion. The proportion of people who followed no religion was higher than the figures in England as a whole (36.67%), while the proportion of Christians was slightly lower than the national figure of 46.32%. Islam, Judaism, Hinduism, Buddhism and Sikhism had a lower following in the district than in the country overall: in 2021, 6.73% of people in England were Muslim, 1.81% were Hindu, 0.92% were Sikh, 0.48% were Jewish and 0.46% were Buddhist.

== Administration ==
Adur's 11 extant Church of England churches are in the Archdeaconry of Chichester, one of four archdeaconries in the Diocese of Chichester, whose cathedral is at Chichester. The churches at Coombes, Lancing (St James the Less at North Lancing and St Michael and All Angels at South Lancing) and Sompting (St Mary the Blessed Virgin and St Peter the Apostle) are part of the Worthing Deanery of the Archdeaconry of Chichester. The three churches at Shoreham-by-Sea, two in Kingston Buci and St Michael and All Angels Church at Southwick are part of Hove Deanery within the Brighton & Lewes Archdeaconry. The redundant church at Fishersgate was also within this deanery.

The Roman Catholic Diocese of Arundel and Brighton, whose cathedral is at Arundel, administers Adur's Roman Catholic churches. The parish of Our Lady Queen of Peace, Adur Valley, includes St Peter's Church in Shoreham-by-Sea as well as churches in Steyning and Upper Beeding in the adjacent district of Horsham. St Theresa of Lisieux Church in Southwick is in the combined parish of Southwick with Portslade and West Blatchington, which also serves the Portslade, Hangleton and West Blatchington areas of Brighton and Hove. The Church of the Holy Family in Lancing is part of the parish of East Worthing in the neighbouring district of Worthing.

Southwick Christian Community Church is part of the 28-church South-East Area of the Congregational Federation, an association of independent Congregational churches in Great Britain. The federation came into existence in 1972 when the Congregational Church in England and Wales merged with several other denominations to form the United Reformed Church. Certain congregations wanted to remain independent of this, and instead joined the Congregational Federation. As of January 2021 there were 235 churches in the Federation. The church has its origins in a fellowship founded by Shoreham Baptist Church, and both churches are also members of the organisation Baptists Together (the Baptist Union of Great Britain). Shoreham Baptist Church is also a member of the Evangelical Alliance. Lancing Tabernacle belongs to the Fellowship of Independent Evangelical Churches.

The three Methodist churches in Adur, at Lancing, Shoreham-by-Sea and Southwick, are part of the 15-church West Sussex (Coast and Downs) Methodist Circuit.

== Current places of worship ==
Current places of worship
Name	Image	Location	Denomination/ Affiliation	Grade	Notes	Refs
Coombes Church (More images)	Three-quarter view of a long, low, flint rubble church on a rising grass slope with some gravestones. A tile-roofed porch juts out from the longer side, which also has two paired lancet windows and two other windows. The shorter side has three single-light round-headed windows and a blocked lancet window below the roofline.	Coombes; 50.8607°N 0.3097°W	Church of England	I	The nave, entrance door and chancel arch remain from the original 11th-century building. The congregation rebuilt the church (apart from its former tower) after a partial collapse in the 18th century. Important 12th-century and later wall paintings were uncovered in 1949. The churchyard has a rare Tapsel gate—a design unique to Sussex.	
Lighthouse Community Church (More images)	Three-quarter view of a long, low, cream-coloured painted hut with white cladding below the tiled roof. An entrance porch with a brown door extends from the shorter side; the longer side, alongside a street corner, has four rectangular windows. "The Lighthouse Community Church" is written in red letters above these.	Fishersgate; 50.8329°N 0.2186°W	Assemblies of God	–	Originally recorded in 1909 as a mission hall, this was re-registered as Emmanuel Evangelical Free Church in January 1932. It has undergone several name changes, and is now affiliated with the Assemblies of God Pentecostal denomination.	
St Giles' Church	A red-brick church with a tiled roof extending nearly to ground level. Low shrubs surround the building on all sides. A three-light lancet window with stone mullions dominates the nearest side. A small stone cross and bell-tower are on the roof. The left-hand side has a white entrance porch.	Kingston Buci; 50.8405°N 0.2614°W	Church of England	–	This church, built in 1906 in the Decorated Gothic style and attributed to Lacy W. Ridge, was the chapel of the workhouse (now Southlands Hospital) until 1934. It then became part of the parish of St Julian's Church and opened for public worship.	
St Julian's Church (More images)	A flint rubble church with large stone quoins. In the nearest wall is a two-light lancet window between buttresses. A squat tower with a squared-off pyramidal roof is partly obscured behind this.	Kingston Buci; 50.8333°N 0.2466°W	Church of England	I	The dedication is 12th-century, but the church existed at the time of the Domesday survey and some 11th-century parts survive. There are remains of an anchorite cell, where a hermit lived in medieval times, in the chancel wall.	
St James the Less Church (More images)	Three-quarter view of a church with flint walls and tiled roofs. A short tower with a pyramidal roof and two small windows rises slightly right of centre. To the left, a longer section with a high roof, with projections with lower rooflines and two low windows to both sides. A porch with an arched doorway extends from the far right side.	Lancing; 50.8379°N 0.3226°W	Church of England	I	A Norman-era doorway is preserved in the south porch at this mostly 13th-century flint-built church. The font survives from the 12th century. The tower was given a new pyramidal cap in the 17th century.	
St Michael and All Angels Church (More images)	Three-quarter view of a flint and stone church in three sections. The middle section is the tallest and widest, and has a very large five-light lancet window with quatrefoils and an extremely narrow slit-like window above. The section on the left has a smaller lancet window and a similar slit. An extension on the right is mostly hidden.	Lancing; 50.8242°N 0.3233°W	Church of England	–	A chapel of ease was provided for South Lancing in 1879. It was succeeded by a temporary iron church in 1893, but in 1924 Arthur Young designed a permanent building in the 14th-century Gothic style. A 1950s extension in brick contrasts with the original flint and stone.	
Lancing Tabernacle (More images)	Front-on view of a dark brick building with lighter brick dressings around the arched entrance. "LANCING TABERNACLE" is written in white letters above this and below a wide, tall, slightly arched window with brown mullions. A brick-paved area is in front.	Lancing; 50.8302°N 0.3220°W	Evangelical	–	The first church of this name was a Railway Mission hall. The wooden building of 1927 was dismantled and re-erected at Fittleworth when a new Tabernacle, of red brick, opened nearby and was registered in 1937.	
Lancing Methodist Church (More images)	A pale stone building with a tiled roof sloping further on the left than on the right. A tower with a two-light lancet window, diamond-shaped decoration and a short spire stands in the near corner. A porch, with two doors and two windows in a lancet style, stands in front of the main body of the church, dominated by a four-light lancet.	Lancing; 50.8251°N 0.3228°W	Methodist	–	A Wesleyan Methodist church existed in South Lancing by 1833 and possibly as early as 1815. Its popularity grew, and in 1904 a larger Early English-style church was built on the site. It was registered for worship in May of that year and for marriages the following month. The 250-capacity building has a tower and spire; a complementary porch was built in 1979.	
Brethren Meeting Room (More images)	Three-quarter view of a pale brick hut with a shallow tiled roof, standing in asphalt-covered grounds behind a wire fence. There is a recessed entrance door between two windows, and four windows in the longer side.	Lancing; 50.8314°N 0.3261°W	Exclusive Brethren	–	A Brethren community was established in Lancing in the 1930s. Its first place of worship was in First Avenue, but it later moved to a new building in Wembley Gardens.	
Church of the Holy Family (More images)	A low, modern brick building with an entrance door surrounded by a ground-to-roof glazed wall. A square tower with a metal-clad glazed area and a crucifix stands to the right. A low-roofed extension to the left has tall windows on one side and one narrow window on the other.	Lancing; 50.8314°N 0.3217°W	Roman Catholic	–	A former farmhouse was used for Masses from 1954 and was registered for worship in March of that year. It was later extended, and served Roman Catholics in Lancing and Sompting until a church was built next to it. This new building was registered in January 1971 and consecrated in 1972. It also replaced a church dedicated to St Paulinus at Lower Cokeham. The new Church of the Holy Family, "attractive in its simplicity", is a concrete and dark red-brick church with a corner tower. It was designed by Henry Bingham Towner or a member of his architectural practice.	
St Peter the Apostle's Church (More images)	Three-quarter view of a modern L-shaped brick building with a blank wall on the shorter side.	Lower Cokeham, Sompting; 50.8269°N 0.3389°W	Church of England	–	This modern brick building is within the parish of St Mary the Blessed Virgin. Consecrated as a church in 1966, it functions as a church hall as well as a place of worship.	
Kingdom Hall (More images)		Lower Cokeham, Sompting; 50.8264°N 0.3341°W	Jehovah's Witnesses	–	This new Kingdom Hall on Leconfield Road replaced the building in Wembley Avenue used since 1960 and was registered for marriages in February 2014. It serves the Lancing Congregation of Jehovah's Witnesses.	
Church of the Good Shepherd (More images)	Side view of a small brick church with a steeply pitched, red-tiled roof extending to just above ground level. Below the roof, there are three paired windows separated by buttresses. A round tower with a conical spire topped by a crucifix stands at the left end. In front of this, a low, flat-roofed extension in dark brick, with a nine-light ground-to-roof window. A shingle beach runs in front.	Shoreham Beach; 50.8263°N 0.2865°W	Church of England	–	Architect Charles Latham designed this church to serve the Shoreham Beach area, where permanent houses were built to replace the wooden buildings of Bungalow Town—destroyed in a storm in 1913. His Early English-style roughcast-clad building opened in 1913 and was extended in 1971.	
Providence Strict Baptist Chapel (More images)	Three-quarter view of a small stuccoed building with a pediment. The longer side is a blank wall; a flint boundary wall runs alongside it. The façade has two simple rectangular windows flanking a round-arched entrance, and a small round window below the pediment.	Shoreham-by-Sea; 50.8325°N 0.2764°W	Baptist	–	This small stuccoed building, in a simple Classical style with deeply recessed windows, was opened in 1867 to replace a nearby meeting room. It was registered for the solemnisation of marriages in November 1930. The chapel is aligned with the Gospel Standard movement.	
St Mary de Haura Church (More images)	Three-quarter view of a substantial stone church with a square clock tower topped with a weather-vane. The tower has two- and three-light arched openings in each face. A triangular-roofed projection to the right has several round-arched windows. The main body of the church extends to the left and has large buttresses topped with spirelets.	Shoreham-by-Sea; 50.8329°N 0.2742°W	Church of England	I	This church, built to serve the Port of Shoreham, was built on a massive scale in the 11th century—possibly as a collegiate church; its east end has survived and forms the present building. The old chancel became the nave when the church was rebuilt in the 18th century from a ruined state.	
St Nicolas' Church (More images)	A cruciform church of flint and stone with a pyramid-roofed central tower topped with a weather-vane. The nearest section is fully obscured by a tree. The tower has three blocked round-arched windows and two round openings below the roof.	Shoreham-by-Sea; 50.8408°N 0.2856°W	Church of England	I	Old Shoreham's church predates the Norman Conquest and received its dedication by the 11th century. Much of the present structure was built in about 1140, although it was restored in 1839–1840. The crossing has a set of carved faces.	
Shoreham Baptist Church (More images)	A long, blue-painted building in three parts: a flat-roofed square block with two windows, a low entrance section with a wide entrance door and a triangular-roofed glazed section, and a building with a large pediment and tiled roof, with three tall round-arched windows.	Shoreham-by-Sea; 50.8344°N 0.2742°W	Baptist	–	Built in 1880 and since extended to the west, this chapel replaced a smaller predecessor dating from 1870. The Italianate design had stuccoed walls, but these have been painted over. The marriages registration of the original chapel, dated March 1875, has been retained.	
Shoreham Free Church (More images)	A brick building with an angular façade consisting of stepped brick walls above an entrance porch with a wooden door in a recess. A crucifix and the words "SHOREHAM FREE CHURCH" are on the façade.	Shoreham-by-Sea; 50.8352°N 0.2716°W	Countess of Huntingdon's Connexion	–	The Countess of Huntingdon's Connexion established its first church in Shoreham in 1800. Behind the 1958 red-brick façade of the present building, the original structure of 1906—built of brick and terracotta—remains. As Buckingham Road Chapel it was originally registered for worship in May 1908 and for marriages three years later; it was re-certified under its present name in September 1951. It stands on the corner of Buckingham and Gordon Roads.	
Shoreham Methodist Church (More images)	Three-quarter view of a building in red brick and with doubled entrance doors and brick-dressed three-light lancet windows with stone mullions.	Shoreham-by-Sea; 50.8331°N 0.2727°W	Methodist	–	This was built as a Wesleyan Methodist chapel in 1900 and was registered for worship in April of that year and for marriages two months later. The first such church in Shoreham had opened a century earlier, and another existed from 1829 on New Road; this was replaced by the present building. Josiah Gunton designed a Perpendicular Gothic red-brick and flint building for the congregation. A glass porch was added in 1995.	
St Peter's Church (More images)	Three-quarter view of a low, shallow-roofed white-painted building with brick quoins and red doors and window frames, situated on a corner plot behind a low flint wall and some shrubs.	Shoreham-by-Sea; 50.8341°N 0.2770°W	Roman Catholic	–	After the town's original Roman Catholic church, also dedicated to Saint Peter, closed in 1982, this new building opened nearby on the site of a Catholic school. Construction started in 1983, and the new church was formally registered for worship and for the solemnisation of marriages in April 1984.	
Church of St Mary the Blessed Virgin (More images)	Side view of a flint church surrounded by a graveyard with bare trees and with a path to the left. The top of a tower with a four-sided slate cap is visible behind the main body of the church. A low porch protrudes to the left.	Sompting; 50.8386°N 0.3518°W	Church of England	I	Renowned for its German-style "Rhenish helm" spire (unique in England) and its Saxon tower, Sompting's parish church retains many 11th- and 12th-century structural elements, including additions made by the Knights Templar and Knights Hospitaller when they held the patronage.	
St Michael and All Angels Church (More images)	Three-quarter view of a flint church with a tall, three-stage tower topped with a dark grey spire. Low projections with paired arched windows flank the tower on both sides. A low flint wall curves round the front of the churchyard.	Southwick; 50.8349°N 0.2413°W	Church of England	II*	Southwick's flint-built parish church was controlled from Kingston Buci in its early years. Most structural work is from the 12th and 13th centuries, but traces of Norman walls remain and the nave dates from the 14th century. The tower was damaged by World War II bombing but was repaired.	
Southwick Christian Community Church (More images)	Front view of a barn-style building consisting of a white-painted section with paired square windows grouped around an arch-headed entrance door and a red-tiled roof with two skylights, and to its right an extension with the same roofline but darker tiling, with a large glazed area and a spiky glass projection from the roof.	Southwick; 50.8374°N 0.2370°W	Congregational Federation	–	Modern additions have hidden the building's origins as a "traditional chapel" built in 1903. This was a stuccoed building with small round-arched windows. A large extension opened to the east in 2003, costing over £1 million. The chapel was originally registered for worship as a Congregational church in December 1904 and for marriages in April 1910.	
Southwick Methodist Church (More images)	A bulky, plain brown brick building. A flat-roofed projection on the near side has four evenly-spaced ground-to-roof windows with concrete details; the main part of the building behind it has evenly-spaced windows in concrete surrounds, the rightmost of which is much taller than the others. A tall, very thin green metal spire sits on the right side of the roof.	Southwick; 50.8370°N 0.2341°W	Methodist	–	Southwick's first Methodist church—now demolished—was active from 1876 to 1955, when its successor (designed by John Leopold Denman) opened. On 4 June 1966 a larger building designed by W.J. Thrasher, linked to the original brick hall by a modern porch structure, was opened. It was registered for worship and for marriages the following month.	
St Theresa of Lisieux Church (More images)	Three-quarter view of a tall, plain red brick church with an entrance porch at the left end and several uneven projections from the near side. The porch has a stone statue and an arched entrance door. The tiled roof has stone ends, both of which have small stone crosses. The lower level of the longer side has 15 unevenly spaced but identical round-headed windows; above this and immediately below the roofline are another eight windows of the same type, which are evenly spaced.	Southwick; 50.8411°N 0.2375°W	Roman Catholic	–	Southwick's Roman Catholic community had to travel elsewhere to worship until 1950, when Mass began to be celebrated in a private house. A Romanesque-style church was built on a site next to the Old Shoreham Road in 1955. Registered for worship in July 1955, it was initially a chapel of ease to the church at Portslade, but it was separately parished and registered for marriages in July 1956.	
Sompting United Reformed Church (More images)	Three-quarter view of a modern brick building in a vernacular style, resembling a cottage. A porch with an arched entrance projects from the façade; above its brown-tiled roof is a three-light window and some wooden panelling with a white crucifix. Three evenly spaced side windows and a larger round-arched window extend down the side.	Upper Cokeham, Sompting; 50.8332°N 0.3362°W	United Reformed Church	–	The Congregational community established a church in Sompting in 1936 in a brick building, although it was not formally registered for worship until March 1938 and for marriages nine months later. Since the Congregational Church became part of the United Reformed Church in the 1970s, the church has served that denomination.	

== Former places of worship ==
Former places of worship
Name	Image	Location	Denomination/ Affiliation	Grade	Notes	Refs
St Peter and St Mary's Church (More images)	A long brick and tile building with central tower on the near side. The whole structure is surrounded by scaffolding and barricades. The tower has tall round-headed windows and louvres on each face, a shallow tiled cap and a stone crucifix.	Fishersgate; 50.8326°N 0.2242°W	Church of England	–	A mission hall opened in 1881 to serve new housing in this area southeast of Southwick. It was replaced in 1938 by a Romanesque church of dark brickwork and tiles, with a squat tower and spire. It became part of the Parish of Southwick in 2004, was declared redundant in November 2008 and is now the Stepping Stones Children and Family Centre.	
Erringham Chapel	A lightly rutted field in winter, with several buildings in the middle distance and hills behind. The buildings are partly obscured by fences, and consist of farm outbuildings, a large farmhouse with a red-tiled roof and chimneys, a smaller adjacent building in a similar style, and a two-storey house.	Old Erringham; 50.8569°N 0.2882°W	Pre-Reformation (Note: The church fell out of use before the Reformation, when the Church of England was established.)	II	A chapel of ease to St Nicolas' Church at Old Shoreham was built in the now depopulated village of Old Erringham in the 11th century. It was out of use by the time of the Reformation, and the remains of its chancel have been turned into a barn. This now stands on private land and is only visible from a distance.	
St Peter's Church (More images)	Side view of a tall, narrow flint building with a steeply-pitched red-tiled roof in which several skylights have been inserted at irregular intervals. Four identical lancet window openings with modern windows, separated by buttresses, dominate the near side; an identical window is visible on the recessed side wall behind it. A stone bell-tower rises from the left-hand side, and below it a porch projects forward a short way.	Shoreham-by-Sea; 50.8327°N 0.2769°W	Roman Catholic	II	Shoreham's first permanent Roman Catholic church was completed in 1875 and was registered for marriages in April 1877. Charles Alban Buckler's 13th-century Decorated Gothic style design was executed in flint and stone, and featured a bell-turret. Augusta, Duchess of Norfolk funded it. It was replaced by a new church in 1982, and became a nursing home and then flats.	
West Street Primitive Methodist Chapel (More images)	Three-quarter view of a pale blue building with a plain exterior and a large pediment, on a crowded site between two flint structures. The façade has three tall, triple-recessed blank arches, the centre of which is shortened to accommodate an entrance door. A round opening sits just below the pediment. The side has round-arched windows.	Shoreham-by-Sea; 50.8330°N 0.2776°W	Methodist	–	This Classical-style chapel was opened in 1862 for the Primitive Methodist community. When a new chapel opened in 1879, it became a Salvation Army hall. Since the 1930s it has been home to the Shoreham Snooker Club. The round-arched recessed side windows can still be seen.	
Southwick Undenominational Mission Hall		Southwick; 50.8376°N 0.2396°W	Non-denominational	–	This mission hall on Cross Road in Southwick was registered for religious worship in 1932. In 1978, planning permission was granted to convert it into a house.	

== See also ==
- Grade I listed buildings in West Sussex
- Listed buildings in Adur
- List of demolished places of worship in West Sussex

== Bibliography ==
- Colquhoun, Edward W. (2008). Shoreham – In Times of Change. Shoreham-by-Sea: Marlipins Museum.
- Coppin, Paul (2006). 101 Medieval Churches of West Sussex. Seaford: S.B. Publications. ISBN 1-85770-306-5.
- Elleray, D. Robert (1981). The Victorian Churches of Sussex. Chichester: Phillimore & Co. Ltd. ISBN 0-85033-378-4.
- Elleray, D. Robert (2004). Sussex Places of Worship. Worthing: Optimus Books. ISBN 0-9533132-7-1.
- Nairn, Ian; Pevsner, Nikolaus (1965). The Buildings of England: Sussex. Harmondsworth: Penguin Books. ISBN 0-14-071028-0.
- Norman, Michael (1989). A Walkabout Guide to Shoreham (2nd ed.). Shoreham-by-Sea: Marlipins Museum.
- Pé, Diana (2006). Mid Sussex Church Walks. PP (Pé Publishing). ISBN 0-9543690-2-5.
- The Diocese of Arundel & Brighton (2020). Diocese of Arundel & Brighton Catholic Directory 2020. Purley: Roman Catholic Diocese of Arundel and Brighton.
- Vigar, John (1994). The Lost Villages of Sussex. Stanbridge: The Dovecote Press Ltd. ISBN 1-874336-29-6.
- Vincent, Alex (2005). The Lost Churches and Chapels of Sussex. Seaford: S.B. Publications. ISBN 1-85770-303-0.
- Wales, Tony (1999). The West Sussex Village Book. Newbury: Countryside Books. ISBN 1-85306-581-1.
