= Erringham chapel =

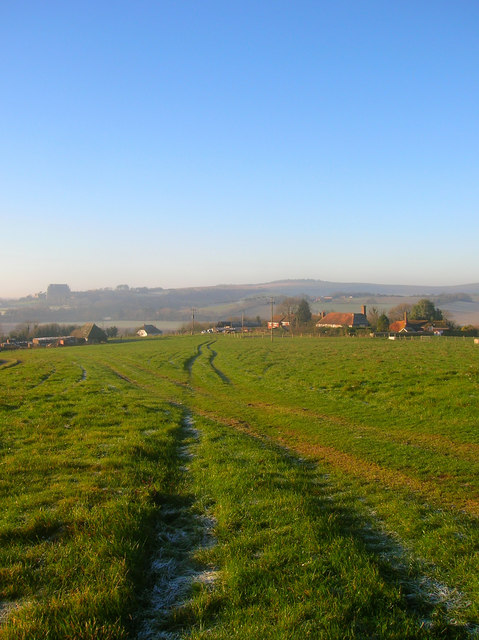
- The remains of the chapel stand on private land at Old Erringham Farm, seen here to the right. The barn is next to the large farmhouse.

- Location within West Sussex
- 50.8659°N 0.2882°W
- Location: Old Erringham Farm, Erringham, Shoreham-by-Sea, West Sussex, United Kingdom

History
- Built: 11th century

Listed Building – Grade II
- Official name: Barn 40 yards south of Old Erringham Farmhouse
- Designated: 8 May 1950
- Reference no.: 1366107

Erringham chapel is a former place of worship in the deserted medieval village of Old Erringham, north of Shoreham-by-Sea in the district of Adur, one of seven local government districts in the English county of West Sussex. Founded in the 11th century as a chapel of ease to St Nicolas' Church in the Saxon riverside village of Old Shoreham, it was in use for several centuries until depopulation caused Old Erringham to become unviable as a settlement. The chapel fell into ruin, and its remains have been incorporated into a barn on the farm which now occupies the site of the village. English Heritage has listed the remaining structure at Grade II for its architectural and historical importance.

== History ==
The east bank of the River Adur—the area covered by the present-day town of Shoreham-by-Sea and its rural hinterland—was first settled during the Iron Age, and also saw Roman activity. During the Saxon era it became a prosperous agricultural area. Two villages developed next to the river: Old Shoreham, about 1 mile (1.6 km) north of the English Channel and the river estuary, and Old Erringham, another mile to the north. Old Shoreham became important enough to support a large church—St Nicolas' Church—by about 900, and its population at the time of the Domesday survey in 1086 was 76. Erringham is believed to have been founded as an exclusively agricultural settlement by a Saxon named Erra, who may have had a homestead there (archaeological evidence discovered in 1964 supports this; the remains of a Saxon hut were found). Seven people were recorded as living in Erringham in 1086.

A chapel of ease was built to serve the settlement in the 11th century. It was never parished, and was always administered from St Nicolas' Church. The flint and stone structure had a chancel and a nave. Some structural work may have been carried out in the 12th and 13th centuries as well, as Erringham briefly grew more important: by the 13th century it had a manor house and windmill, and its population was nearly the same as that of Old Shoreham. William de Braose, 1st Lord of Bramber held the chapel and its mother church at the time of the Domesday survey in 1086; soon afterwards he or his son Philip founded the new town of New Shoreham at the river estuary and built a third church, dedicated to St Mary de Haura, there.

The chapel continued in service for about 300 years, but the rapid decline of Old Erringham village led to its abandonment. Because the village was thriving in the 13th century and was reliant on agriculture, its depopulation has been explained by a combination of the Black Death of the mid-14th century, changes in farming methods, and alterations in the flow of the nearby River Adur (which affected how the land could be farmed). By the 16th century, only one farm survived. The chapel fell into disrepair: the nave disappeared (although its foundations can still be seen) and only the chancel was left standing. This was converted into a barn on the farm.

The structure is still known as, and marked on maps as, "The Chapel". The east wall retains a stone-mullioned two-light window of the "Transitional" style between Norman and English Gothic architecture (a style also employed in the substantial parish church of New Shoreham, St Mary de Haura Church, in the late 12th century). The north and south walls each have one small Norman-era lancet window. The entrance door is in the west wall. Modern additions include an iron roof and a concrete floor.

Erringham chapel was listed at Grade II by English Heritage on 8 May 1950. Such buildings are defined as being "nationally important and of special interest". As of February 2001, it was one of 106 Grade II listed buildings, and 119 listed buildings of all grades, in Adur district.

== See also ==
- List of places of worship in Adur
- Listed buildings in Adur
