= Red Lion Inn, Shoreham-by-Sea =

Red Lion Inn
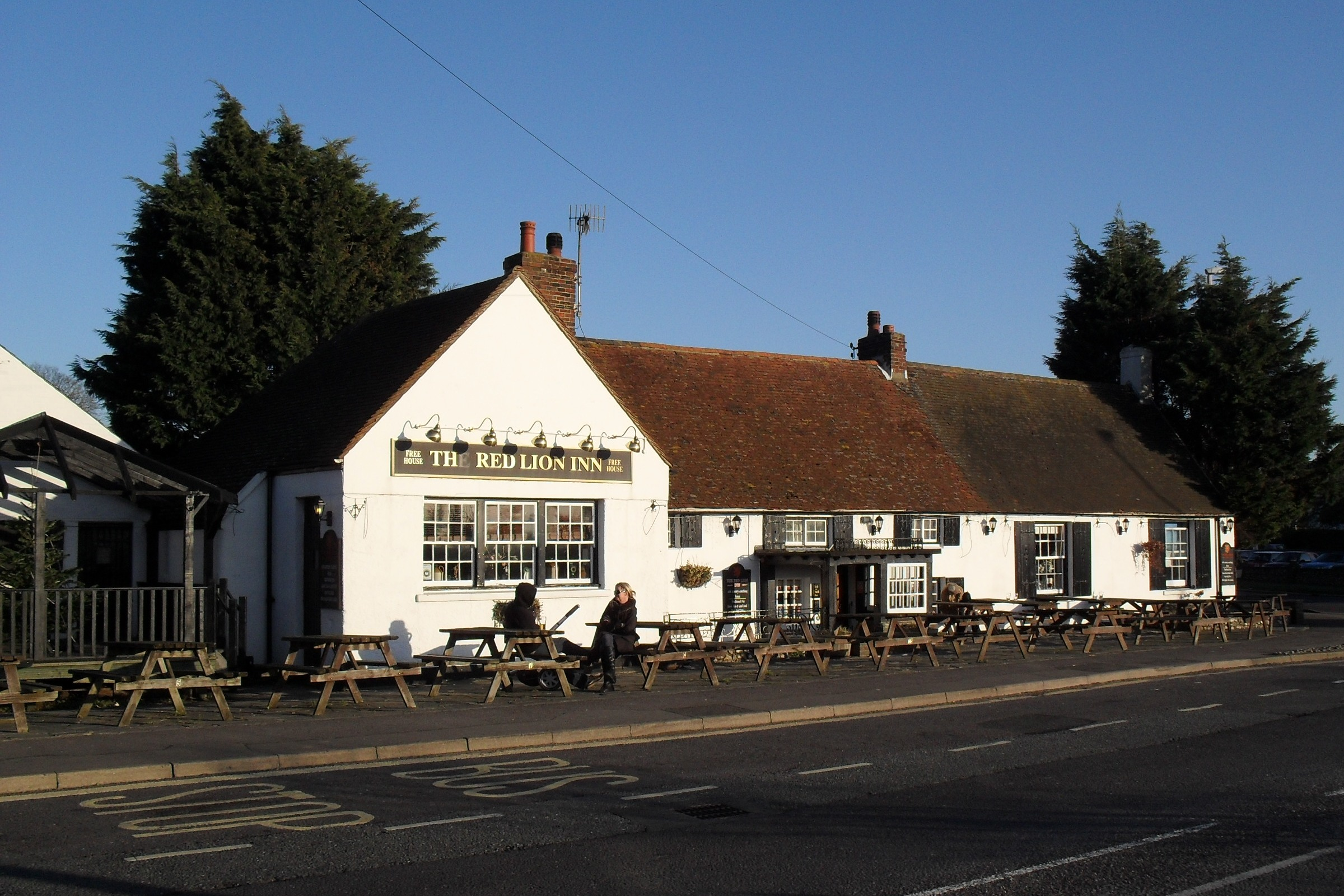
- The inn viewed from the northwest

- Location within West Sussex
- 50°50′24″N 0°17′09″W
- Location: Old Shoreham Road, Old Shoreham, Shoreham-by-Sea

History
- Built: 16th century or earlier

Site notes
- Area: West Sussex
- Architectural style: Vernacular

Listed Building – Grade II
- Official name: Red Lion Public House
- Designated: 29 September 1972
- Reference no.: 1286370

The Red Lion Inn is a 16th-century public house in the ancient Old Shoreham part of the town of Shoreham-by-Sea, in the Adur district of West Sussex, England. Established in the 16th century in part of a former monastery and cottage in the centre of Old Shoreham, opposite the village's former tollbridge, it was extended in the 19th century and became central to life in the old village. Alfred, Lord Tennyson's poem Rizpah is based on events at the inn in the 19th century which resulted in the capture and execution of some robbers. English Heritage has listed the building at Grade II for its architectural and historical importance.

== History ==
Old Shoreham developed on the east bank of the River Adur, just north of the estuary on the English Channel in the Saxon period; longstanding claims that it was the site (Cymenshore) of the first King of the South Saxons Ælle's arrival in 477 have been disproved. The village was successful: a large church, dedicated to St Nicolas, was founded in about 900 and extended in 1140, and there were 76 residents at the time of the Domesday survey in 1086.

A tollbridge to the west bank of the Adur at Lancing was built in 1782. This, and the diversion of the road eastwards to the seaside resort of Brighton, caused the focus of the village to move westwards, towards the river and the west end of the old village street. A cottage, apparently part of a former monastery, stood on the old road near the tollbridge. It was converted into an inn under the sign of the Red Lion. The building was extended and lengthened to the north and south later in the 18th century and in the 19th century. It developed trade as a coaching inn serving the roads towards Brighton (eastwards) and Steyning (northwards, along the bank of the river). In the 1920s, the main road to Brighton was realigned again: thereafter it ran immediately south of the inn.

The inn was central to a locally famous tragedy which gained wider recognition when Alfred, Lord Tennyson wrote a poem, Rizpah, based on it. On 1 November 1792, the driver of the local mail coach had to deliver a letter containing half a sovereign (approximate value £60 as of 2025) on his usual route between Brighton and Shoreham. At Hove he was robbed by two Shoreham men, one of whom went on to the Red Lion to meet drinking companions. He was heard discussing the crime by Phoebe Hessel, a well-known Brighton resident who frequented the inn. She reported him to the local parish constable, who arrested both men. The robbery had involved no violence, but the men were sentenced to death at Horsham Assizes: they were tied to horses and sent there accompanied by a military and police escort. On 26 April 1793 a large crowd watched as they were hanged at the place where they robbed the mail coach; their bodies were dressed and left to rot on the gibbet. The younger man's mother was so distraught that she travelled every night to Hove to collect the decaying bones and flesh, and eventually interred them in the graveyard at St Nicolas' Church.

Another bizarre event involving a dead robber occurred at the inn in the 1850s. A man burgled several houses in Shoreham, but when he broke into Buckingham House (an 18th-century mansion with a history dating back to the mid-17th century or earlier) he was shot dead. Nobody could identify him, so his body was placed in a glass-topped coffin and left at the inn in case any visitors recognised his face. Hundreds of people travelled to Shoreham to inspect the coffin, but the man was eventually identified by his dog, which appeared at the inn, saw the man's face and sat by the body, refusing to leave it. The robber was identified as John O'Hara and was buried at St Nicolas' Church.

A tradition called "The Bushel"—a drinking custom held on New Year's Day—lasted for much of the 19th century at the Red Lion: it was last documented in 1883. A bushel of beer was covered with greenery and flowers so that when the beer was poured in, the head erupted in a cauliflower shape. The beer was then doled out to all comers, and the "chairman" in charge of the festivities was then allowed to drink from the bushel.

The Red Lion Inn was listed at Grade II by English Heritage on 29 September 1972. This defines it as a "nationally important" building of "special interest". As of February 2001, it was one of 106 Grade II listed buildings, and 119 listed buildings of all grades, in the district of Adur. The building is served by Brighton & Hove bus routes 2, 59, 60 and 98.

== Architecture ==
The building is mostly 18th-century, although 16th-century origins have been claimed. It is a low-set, long building in three parts: the central section is the original cottage, and 18th- and 19th-century additions stand to the left (north) and right (south). The exterior walls are plaster-coated, and the roofs are laid with tiles of Horsham stone. The building is roughly L-shaped, with a projecting wing at the north end. Only the centre section is higher than one storey, and even it does not reach a full two-storey height. Furthermore, the building is now set below the level of the road, which has been raised since its origins as a village track. The centre section has a three casement window range, and there are three sashes elsewhere (two on the façade of the southward extension and one in the cross-wing to the north). The substantial entrance door is set in a timbered porch; both were added in the 20th century.
