= St Julian's Church, Kingston Buci =

St Julian's Church
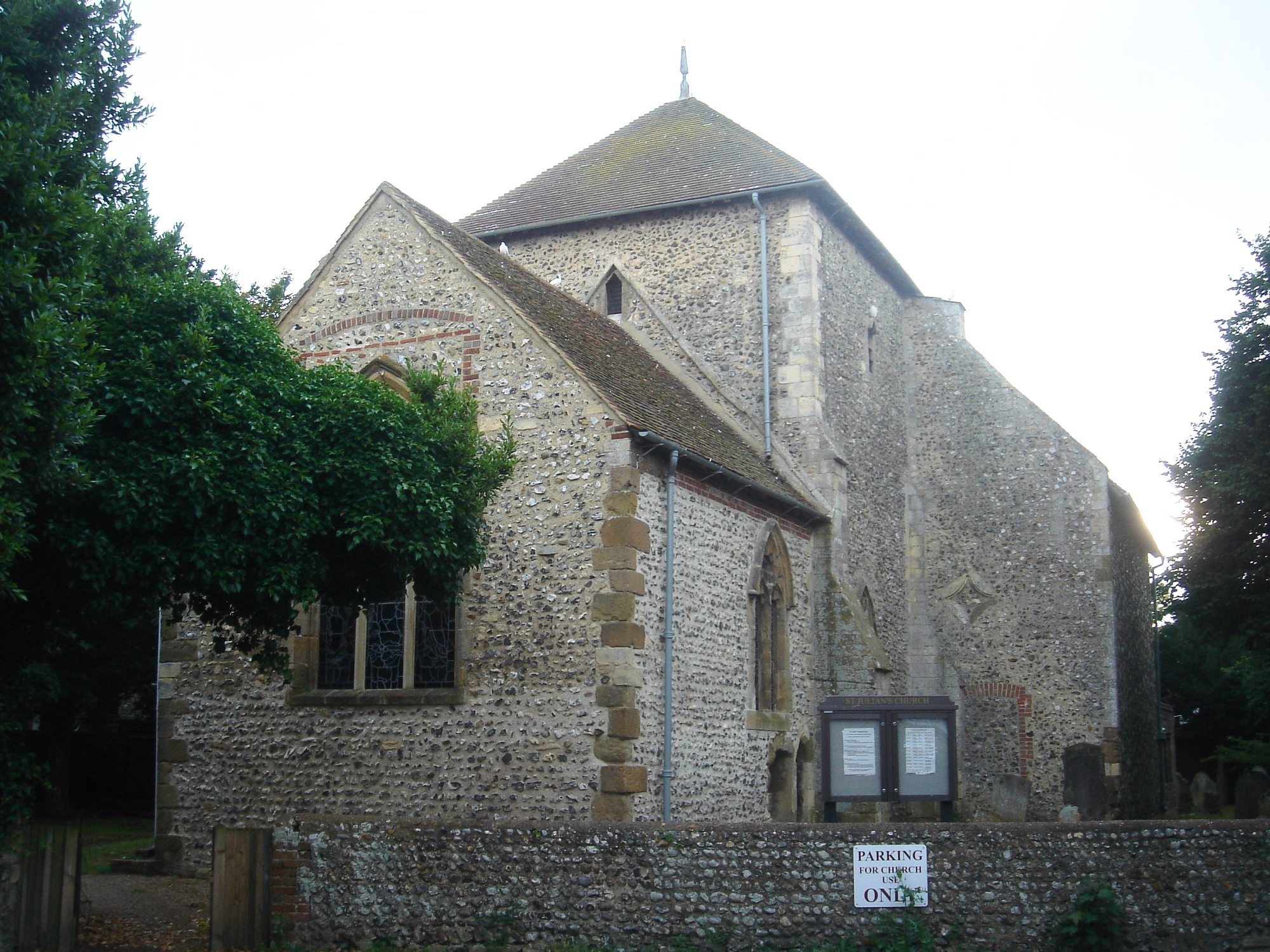
- The church from the east
- St Julian's Church
- 50.8333°N 0.2466°W
- Location: St Julian's Lane, Kingston Buci, Shoreham-by-Sea, West Sussex BN43 6YS
- Country: England
- Denomination: Church of England

History
- Status: Parish church
- Founded: 11th century
- Dedication: Julian of Le Mans
- Dedicated: By late 12th century

Architecture
- Functional status: Active
- Heritage designation: Grade I
- Designated: 8 May 1950
- Style: Norman; Early English
- Completed: 13th century

Administration
- Province: Canterbury
- Diocese: Chichester
- Archdeaconry: Chichester
- Deanery: Rural Deanery of Hove
- Parish: Kingston Buci, St Julian

Clergy
- Vicar: Rev'd James Grant

St Julian's Church is an Anglican church in Kingston Buci (also known as Kingston by Sea) in the district of Adur, one of seven local government districts in the English county of West Sussex. Kingston Buci was a Saxon-era village near the English Channel coast between Southwick and Shoreham-by-Sea; little remains from that period, and modern residential development has obscured the old boundaries between the settlements, but the church retains its mostly 13th-century appearance and serves a parish which retains the ancient Kingston Buci name. English Heritage has listed it at Grade I for its architectural and historical importance.

== History ==
Kingston, as it was originally called, was founded as an Anglo-Saxon settlement—possibly with Celtic influence. The manor was held by Ralph de Buci on behalf of William de Braose, 1st Lord of Bramber at the time of the Domesday survey in 1086, and a church was established by that time. Excavations carried out in the 1960s discovered that the foundations and the surviving nave walls were late Saxon, predating the Norman conquest by a few years.

The church was dedicated to Julian of Le Mans during the 12th century. A century later, the building took its present form when the chancel and central tower were built, creating the simple three-cell (nave–tower–chancel) layout. A two-bay north aisle was added to the nave at the same time, and a porch was built on the south side. The advowson of the church was held by the de Buci family throughout this period; it passed out of their control when the manor was conveyed to another family in 1356. Since 1826, when George Wyndham, 3rd Earl of Egremont acquired the advowson, the patrons of the church have been the Earl of Egremont and their successors, the Baronetcy of Leconfield. Max Wyndham, 2nd Baron Egremont is the current incumbent.

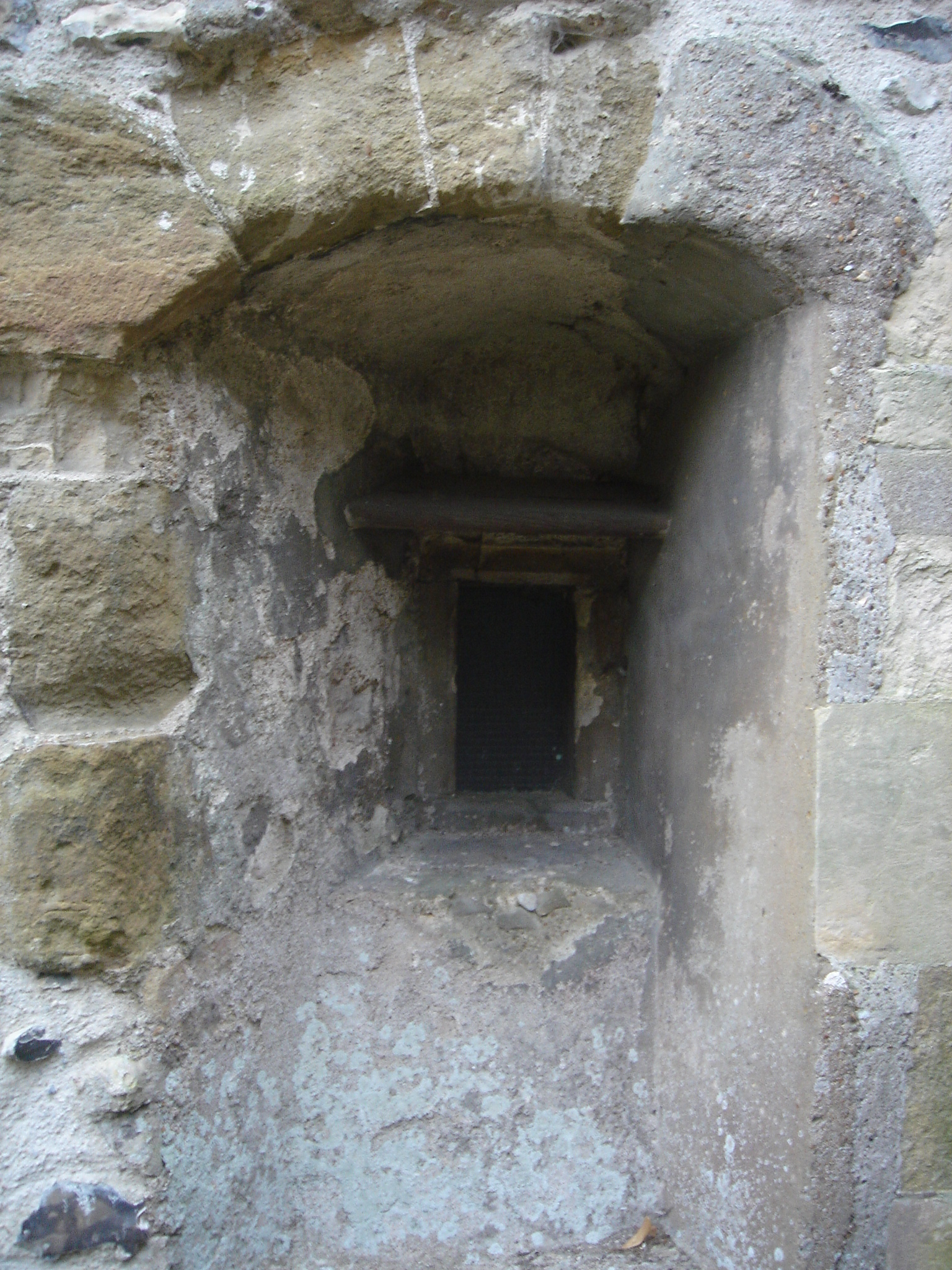
This window was the only connection between the anchorite cell and the rest of the church

One unusual and ancient feature of the church, which survived in a complete form until the 14th century, was an anchorite's cell. These rare features, associated with medieval churches, housed hermits who were pursuing a life of asceticism: they would be walled up inside the cell for life, and a window into the chancel would connect them to the church. At St Julian's Church, the cell walls themselves were removed by the 14th century, but the window (a form of hagioscope) and a door remain in perfect condition, and the roofline can still be seen. The door would have been built over when the anchorite was in the cell.

Lancet and Perpendicular Gothic windows were added in the north, south and west walls in the 14th and 15th centuries. The Lewknor family, who held the advowson in the 16th century, built an Easter Sepulchre at the north end of the chancel, containing the family tomb and memorials. Restoration in the 19th century renewed some of the windows—for which the Perpendicular style was retained except in the east wall, which was given a large lancet window—improved the north aisle and added a buttress to the outside of the nave.

== Architecture ==
St Julian's Church is a flint building with stone dressings, and consists of a nave with a north aisle, chancel and central (but partly offset) tower. The chancel and tower are the same width, and there are no transepts. The walls of the nave survive from the 11th century, and the rebuilding work of the 13th century appears not to have changed the proportions of the rest of the church. Although the aisle was rebuilt in the 19th century, its large arches—described by Nikolaus Pevsner as "beautifully proportioned"—remain from the 13th century, when it was originally built.

The tower has a rib vault in which the ribs are moulded and rest on columns with rounded abaci. The central placement of the tower and the vaulted arrangement mean that its lower section forms the quire. Outside, it is capped by a shallow, pyramid-shaped hipped roof laid with pantiles.

Interior features include the Lewknor family's tomb in the Easter Sepulchre, a pulpit with two decks, an organ in its own gallery, a 14th-century chancel screen, a rare singing-desk and some box pews. The Lewknor tomb has ogee mouldings and a series of carvings depicting the Pietà, the Resurrection of Jesus and the Trinity. The pulpit, made in the 18th century, dominates the interior with its size and positioning. The lower deck, an uncommon feature, serves as a separate priest's reading desk.

== The church today ==
St Julian's Church was listed at Grade I by English Heritage on 8 May 1950. Such buildings are defined as being of "exceptional interest" and greater than national importance. As of February 2001, it was one of seven Grade I listed buildings, and 119 listed buildings of all grades, in Adur district. The organ was moved from its original home in Brighton Aquarium, and still bears a bronze plaque stating its former location. It has an electric blower, but the original hand pumping mechanism is still in place. The organist sits precariously high in the balcony, and the view over the organists shoulder is not for the faint hearted!

The parish covers the area now referred to on maps as Kingston by Sea. The eastern boundary is formed by Kingston Lane and Upper Kingston Lane; on the west side, Eastern Lane forms the border with Shoreham-by-Sea; to the south is the River Adur; and field boundaries on the downland slopes form the northern limits. These correspond with the ancient parish boundaries. The area is 782 acres (316 ha).

== See also ==
- List of places of worship in Adur
