= Listed buildings in Adur =

The district of Adur, one of seven local government districts in the English county of West Sussex, has 119 buildings with listed status. The urbanised southern part of the district forms part of the Brighton/Worthing/Littlehampton conurbation, and most listed structures are in the three main centres of population: Southwick, Shoreham-by-Sea and Lancing. The towns have grown residentially and industrially in the 20th century, but all three have ancient origins as villages and manors on the banks of the River Adur and the English Channel coast. The rest of Adur district's territory is remote downland countryside with scattered farms and hamlets; some of their buildings also have listed status.

In England, a building or structure is defined as "listed" when it is placed on a statutory register of buildings of "special architectural or historic interest" by the Secretary of State for Culture, Media and Sport, a Government department, in accordance with the Planning (Listed Buildings and Conservation Areas) Act 1990 (a successor to the 1947 act). English Heritage, a non-departmental public body, acts as an agency of this department to administer the process and advise the department on relevant issues. There are three grades of listing status. Grade I, the highest, is defined as being of "exceptional interest"; Grade II* is used for "particularly important buildings of more than special interest"; and Grade II, the lowest, is used for buildings of "special interest".

There are currently 7 grade I listed buildings, 7 grade II* listed buildings, and 105 grade II listed buildings in Adur district.

== Key ==
Grade	Criteria
Grade I	Buildings of exceptional interest, sometimes considered to be internationally important.
Grade II*	Particularly important buildings of more than special interest.
Grade II	Buildings of national importance and special interest.

== Listed buildings ==
Name	Image	Location and Coordinates	Grade	Notes	Refs
Coombes Church	Three-quarter view of a long, low, flint rubble church on a rising grass slope with some gravestones. A tile-roofed porch juts out from the longer side, which also has two paired lancet windows and two other windows. The shorter side has three single-light round-headed windows and a blocked lancet window below the roofline.	Coombes; 50.8607°N 0.3097°W	I	The Anglican church in the remote hamlet of Coombes has been "folded into the South Downs" since its construction in the 11th century. Features such as a rare Tapsel gate, ancient wall paintings and an absence of Victorian-era restoration make the building historically significant.	
St Julian's Church	A flint rubble church with large stone quoins, behind a low flint wall. A three-light lancet window in the nearest wall is partly obscured by a tree in full leaf. A squat tower with a squared-off pyramidal roof stands in the middle. To its right is a blank-walled protrusion with a blocked entrance.	Kingston Buci; 50.8333°N 0.2466°W	I	The settlement of Kingston Buci, now surrounded by modern housing, has been served by this stone building since before the Domesday survey of 1086, and some 11th-century fabric remains—as does a rare medieval anchorite cell.	
St James the Less Church	A long church with flint walls and tiled roofs. A short tower with a pyramidal roof and two small windows rises slightly right of centre. To the left, a longer section with a high roof, in front of which is a projection with a lower roofline and two low windows. A porch with an arched doorway extends from the far left side. To the right, there is a shorter and lower section with two windows. A path leads through a graveyard to the porch.	Lancing; 50.8379°N 0.3226°W	I	Lancing's parish church, which existed by the 12th century, was rebuilt in the 13th century, but an older doorway and font were preserved. Restoration in the 18th and 19th centuries rescued the church from disrepair.	
Lancing College (Chapel)		Lancing; 50.8467°N 0.3024°W	I	Designed by Richard Herbert Carpenter for the college's founder Nathaniel Woodard and executed in locally quarried stone by Woodard's son, the gigantic chapel—94 feet (29 m) high inside—has been called a "triumph of Woodard's willpower" and is an important example of Gothic Revival architecture. The interior has French Gothic touches.	
St Nicolas' Church	A cruciform church of flint and stone with a pyramid-roofed central tower topped with a weather-vane. The nearest section is fully obscured by a tree. The tower has three blocked round-arched windows and two round openings below the roof.	Old Shoreham, Shoreham-by-Sea; 50.8408°N 0.2856°W	I	Founded before the Norman conquest to serve Old Shoreham, this riverside church was restored during the Victorian era but still retains many features from its 12th-century rebuilding, including some carvings of King Stephen, an elf and a cat.	
St Mary de Haura Church	Side view of a substantial stone church with a square clock tower topped with a weather-vane. The tower has two- and three-light arched openings in each face. A triangular-roofed projection to the left has several round-arched windows and a small brown door. The main body of the church, partly obscured by a tree, extends to the right, and has large buttresses topped with spirelets.	Shoreham-by-Sea; 50.8329°N 0.2742°W	I	The church dominates the town centre and port of Shoreham-by-Sea, but the present structure is just part of the original building, which may have been an 11th-century collegiate church. Erosion, storms and lack of use caused most of the building to collapse in the 18th century; parts were salvaged to form the rebuilt church.	
Church of St Mary the Blessed Virgin	Side view of a flint church surrounded by a graveyard with bare trees and with a path to the left. The top of a tower with a four-sided slate cap is visible behind the main body of the church. A low porch protrudes to the left.	Sompting; 50.8386°N 0.3518°W	I	The "Rhenish helm" spire on the Saxon-era tower of Sompting's Anglican church is unique in England, and many Norman structural elements remain. Former patrons the Knights Templar and Knights Hospitaller built several extensions to the flint and Caen stone building.	
Lancing College (East and West Quadrangles)		Lancing; 50.8462°N 0.3041°W	II*	Richard Cromwell Carpenter started designing these in 1848, and building work continued after his death in 1855. Later additions by his son Richard Herbert Carpenter and Maxwell Ayrton kept up the Gothic Revival style of the original plans, marked by plain flint with stone dressings and parapets.	
Lancing College (Great School)		Lancing; 50.8466°N 0.3045°W	II*	Richard Herbert Carpenter's school hall and classrooms of 1877 onwards was described as "ugly" by Nikolaus Pevsner, who praised the rest of the college buildings. The Gothic-style buildings are of flint and sandstone. The main hall has a clerestorey and a crown post ceiling of oak beams.	
Shoreham Airport		Lancing; 50.8335°N 0.2907°W	II*	Stavers Hessell Tiltman's Art Deco/Streamline Moderne terminal building of 1935 opened on 13 June 1936 and is still in use. The airport is Britain's oldest licensed airfield. The original steel-framed structure clad in cement and concrete is still mostly intact, although some additions have been made.	
Shoreham Tollbridge		Old Shoreham, Shoreham-by-Sea; 50.8320°N 0.2762°W	II*	This former tollbridge was built in 1781 across the River Adur to link Old Shoreham with Lancing. It was rebuilt in 1916, and only pedestrians are now able to use the 500-foot (150 m) structure. The arch is supported on 27 timber spans, some with metal reinforcements.	
Marlipins Museum		Shoreham-by-Sea; 50.8407°N 0.2891°W	II*	Shoreham's only secular building of Norman origin dates from about 1100 and retains one window from that time, but its rebuilding in about 1330 gave it the appearance it has now. The chequerboard-style façade has alternating blocks of knapped flint and Caen stone. It has been a market house, a customs house and a courtroom, and is now a museum.	
St Michael and All Angels Church	Three-quarter view of a flint church with a tall, three-stage tower to the left, topped with a dark grey spire. Low projections with paired arched windows flank the tower on both sides. A porch juts forward from the main body of the church, next to three low lancet windows. The roofs are of red tiles. Irregularly spaced gravestones are in front of the church.	Southwick; 50.8349°N 0.2413°W	II*	The tower and spire of Southwick's parish church had to be rebuilt piece by piece after a World War II bomb shattered them, but the building has changed little since the 14th century, when the present nave was added. Fragments of 11th-century work remain in the mostly 12th- and 13th-century flint structure.	
49 The Green		Southwick; 50.8343°N 0.2391°W	II*	This large early-18th-century house, originally a hall, faces Southwick's village green. The L-shaped structure is principally flint with wooden modillions and red brickwork around the windows and on the quoins. The longer side has an eight-sash window range, and the door has a hooded porch with Doric columns.	
Applesham Farmhouse		Coombes; 50.8514°N 0.3036°W	II	This is the old manor house of the hamlet of Applesham, part of the parish of Coombes. Mostly of irregular flintwork with brick dressings, its age is unknown (although it was in place by the 17th century) and several additions have been made, including a brick-built wing in the 19th century. Some Horsham stonework remains on the roof.	
Barn at Applesham Farm		Coombes; 50.8520°N 0.3045°W	II	Part of the group of buildings at Applesham Farm, this wide structure is of flint with quoins and dressings of red brick. Inside, there is a timber roof structure with tie-beams and arched supports.	
Church Farmhouse		Coombes; 50.8612°N 0.3083°W	II	Also called Coombes Farmhouse, this is no later than 17th-century in origin, but additions were made in the 19th century, especially at the rear. The original timber framing and plasterwork was augmented by brick-dressed flint on one bay, but is visible elsewhere.	
Former Stable at Applesham Farm		Coombes; 50.8520°N 0.3040°W	II	Like the other farm buildings, this is of flint with some red brickwork. Irregularly placed wooden-mullioned windows have been inserted in the main façade. The roof has a half-hip.	
K6 Telephone Kiosk, Coombes Road		Coombes; 50.8616°N 0.3079°W	II	This is an example of the standard K6 style of telephone booth designed by Giles Gilbert Scott in 1935. It is glazed on all four sides, built of red-painted cast iron and topped with a shallow dome-style roof.	
Ox Brook Cottage		Coombes; 50.8615°N 0.3079°W	II	Two cottages share this two-storey building, which existed by the 18th century. The façade has a three-window range and is clad in flint with some brickwork. The slate hipped roof also has a pentice at one corner, and there is a squat chimney in the centre.	
Old Rectory		Coombes; 50.8602°N 0.3084°W	II	Mentioned in medieval times and built in the 15th century, this is the former clergy house. It is timber-framed with supporting plasterwork and a later flint wall to the east. The roof has been renewed; it was originally of local stone. It fell into disrepair in the 19th century and was later converted into housing.	
Sussex Arms		Fishersgate; 50.8311°N 0.2178°W	II	This pub in the Fishersgate area of Southwick, on the Brighton and Hove city boundary, dates from the 1830s. Clad in stucco and with a hipped roof of slate, it has two storeys topped by a cornice and parapet. The door is set in a porch with its own parapet supported by pilasters, and there are sash windows.	
Barn northwest of St Julian's Church		Kingston Buci; 50.8336°N 0.2470°W	II	This flint structure with some exterior brickwork dates from the 17th century. The tiled hipped roof slopes steeply almost to ground level at the sides. Two sections, also with hipped roofs, protrude from the sides. The old doors and windows have been replaced.	
Old Rectory		Kingston Buci; 50.8334°N 0.2460°W	II	Kingston Buci's former rectory was built as a three-bay house in the early 18th century. An extension was built in the 19th century, when new casement windows were inserted. The local stone and tile roof has a gable and partly hipped, and there are three chimneys. Structurally, flint and brick predominate.	
Ruined Dovecote near St Julian's Church		Kingston Buci; 50.8337°N 0.2469°W	II	Part of the group of 18th-century buildings around St Julian's Church, this former dovecote is now merely a four-walled open square structure of flint and stone. Stone quoins are prominent. The east wall is much lower and partly open, while the north wall has a former doorway, now blocked.	
Shoreham College		Kingston Buci; 50.8329°N 0.2467°W	II	Built as a house in the early 18th century, this partly knapped flint structure has been extended and altered several times, and has been a private school since 1968. Late-19th-century interior panelwork, doors and a Jacobean-style staircase survive inside. The main wing of the two-storey building has five bays with irregularly spaced sash windows.	
Shoreham Harbour Lighthouse		Kingston Buci; 50.8312°N 0.2518°W	II	Also called Kingston Lighthouse, this small ashlar structure was built in 1846. It tapers gradually from the stone plinth, terminating in a wooden lantern room with metal railings, a hipped roof, a globe and a weather-vane.	
Church Farmhouse		Lancing; 50.8385°N 0.3224°W	II	Although modernised and extended, especially on the north side, this L-shaped house has an 18th-century core. Cement on the ground floor of the five-window façade hides the original flintwork. Red brick quoins, window surrounds and a string course can also be seen.	
Friar's Acre		Lancing; 50.8380°N 0.3219°W	II	This low-set two-storey timber-framed cottage—originally the farmhouse of Brickhouse Farm—dates from 1659. Some brickwork and a few flints have been added to augment the timber. The roof is hipped and partly gabled, and supports a chimney which is not original. The diamond-pattern windows are 19th-century. The name has changed many times, most recently in the mid-20th century.	
Garden walls at Smithy Cottage		Lancing; 50.8386°N 0.3196°W	II	This uneven flint wall surrounds the cottage on Mill Road, Lancing. The house was originally a forge, hence the name; it was first recorded in 1770, but was probably older.	
Grants Manor		Lancing; 50.8390°N 0.3202°W	II	This timber-framed 17th-century cottage used to be called The Old Posting House. Timber can still be seen on some external walls, but brick of various colours and roughcast hides the rest. The roof is hipped and laid with Horsham stone slabs. The name comes from the Le Graunt family, first recorded in 1200.	
Hawthorn Cottage		Lancing; 50.8392°N 0.3192°W	II	This two-storey cottage has a three-window range, all fitted with casements and dressed with red brick. Otherwise, the exterior is of flint coated in whitewash. It was originally Number 20 Joyces Cottages, part of a terrace of tenements.	
Hoe Court Farmhouse		Lancing; 50.8425°N 0.3093°W	II	Although built in the 17th century, this former farmhouse does not retain its original appearance as a gable-roofed porch has been added and the walls have been stuccoed. The tiled roof slopes a long way down to the rear. An ancient track (possibly Neolithic) passes the building.	
Lancing College (Fields House)		Lancing; 50.8463°N 0.3051°W	II	Maxwell Ayrton's extension of 1912–13 completed R.H. Carpenter's work in the upper quadrangle. The Neo-Gothic knapped flint buildings are similar in style to their neighbours. The parapet is castellated, the walls are heavily buttressed and the casement windows have transoms and mullions.	
Monks Farm Presbytery		Lancing; 50.8311°N 0.3216°W	II	A new Monks Farm replaced this stuccoed farmhouse in 1935. Mostly 18th-century, it timber-framed parts of a 16th-century building inside. Lord Alfred Douglas died there in 1945; nine years later it became a Roman Catholic chapel which eventually held 200 worshippers. It became the presbytery when a new church was built next to it 1972.	
Old Cottage		Lancing; 50.8385°N 0.3208°W	II	This timber-framed cottage is believed to be 17th-century. Plasterwork now fills the gaps between the timbers, and the roof is thatched. The upper storey is jettied on the north side.	
Old Farmhouse		Lancing; 50.8440°N 0.3015°W	II	The former College Farm (known before that as Burvills Farm) is in the grounds of Lancing College. It is L-shaped and was built in two parts: the oldest is 17th-century, and another wing was added early in the 19th century. This is mainly flint with some red-brick dressings, while the older part is brick and tile-hung. Nathaniel Woodard bought it in 1852 to build the college.	
Old Salts Farmhouse		Lancing; 50.8274°N 0.3078°W	II	Two sections of two storeys run side by side, a wing projects to form an L shape and a one-storey lean-to stands at the opposite end of this cobbled 18th-century farmhouse. The farm was probably part of the Adur estuary at the time of the Domesday survey in 1086, indicating the extent to which the coastline has changed.	
Shoreham Airport (Municipal Hangar)		Lancing; 50.8331°N 0.2917°W	II	Boulton & Paul Ltd erected this steel-framed hangar in 1935 for the new Shoreham Airport. Its walls are concrete and brick. Two metal sliding doors allow the north wall to be opened wide. The framework survived when the hangar was bombed in 1941, although the walls and asbestos and corrugated metal roof were destroyed. Despite this, its appearance has changed little since the 1930s.	
Smithy Cottage		Lancing; 50.8387°N 0.3198°W	II	This wide two-storey cottage with a four-window range dates from approximately 1800. The walls are flint with red brickwork around the sash and casement windows and at the quoins, and the roof is of slate.	
Twitten Cottage		Lancing; 50.8392°N 0.3189°W	II	The east side of the roof of this small late-17th- or early-18th-century house is a steeply sloping pentice, and the south wall has tiles and stucco; elsewhere, flint and red bricks are used. The windows are sashes. It was originally a tenement let on a quarterly tenancy.	
Hollies		Lower Cokeham, Sompting; 50.8311°N 0.3373°W	II	This slate-roofed cottage was originally detached when built in the 19th century, but a modern house now adjoins it. There is a three-window range and an off-centre brick porch with a gabled roof. The windows are surrounded by brickwork, but flint cobbles are the main building material.	
Manor Cottage		Lower Cokeham, Sompting; 50.8280°N 0.3362°W	II	Originally attributed to the 17th century, this thatched Wealden hall house is now thought to be a century older. The brick ground floor dates from a 19th-century renovation, and the porch is more recent. The rest of the structure is timber-framed with some plasterwork.	
Former Erringham Chapel		Old Erringham; 50.8569°N 0.2882°W	II	The medieval village of Old Erringham had a chapel of ease, served from St Nicolas' Church at Old Shoreham, between the 11th and 15th centuries. The former chancel survives as a barn.	
Old Erringham Farmhouse		Old Erringham; 50.8565°N 0.2885°W	II	The land has been farmed for many centuries, but the present farmhouse is a 16th-century open hall-house. Large chimney-stacks have been added to the flint and stone building. An extension at the rear houses the entrance and a lancet window.	
4 and 5 The Street		Old Shoreham, Shoreham-by-Sea; 50.8422°N 0.2820°W	II	These two cottages are the surviving part of a former terrace built in the early 18th century. They are mostly of flint and brick with some weatherboarding and cobblestones. The tiled roofs have three dormer windows which form part of a small upper storey. All windows are casements.	
108–110 Connaught Avenue	A wide, white-painted building with a prominent thatched roof and two chimneys. There are nine irregularly spaced windows; those at first-floor level are immediately below the roofline and are smaller. A blue door is set in the left-hand side, and a white gate is set next to it in a flint wall. A stumpy, possibly dead tree obscures the rightmost two windows.	Old Shoreham, Shoreham-by-Sea; 50.8397°N 0.2847°W	II	This pair of cottages, under the same thatched roof, may be as old as the late 16th century. The two-storey rendered building has uneven walls causing the ends to be different widths. The façade has nine irregularly spaced windows and two entrance doors	
Adur Lodge and garden wall		Old Shoreham, Shoreham-by-Sea; 50.8426°N 0.2812°W	II	When Old Shoreham Farm was leased out in 1832, this house formed part of the estate and was described as "recently built". It is mostly of flint cobbles with some red brickwork, although the east wall was refaced in plaster in the 19th century. A ground-floor veranda is decorated with anthemion motifs. The slate roof has dormers.	
Barn northeast of Old Shoreham Farmhouse		Old Shoreham, Shoreham-by-Sea; 50.8407°N 0.2842°W	II	This barn is not as old as the farm, but certainly existed by the early 19th century. The walls are of flint with some red brickwork, and the roof is laid with tiles. Inside, a diagonal purlin survives on the timber roof.	
Hunter's Moon Cottage and No 9 The Street		Old Shoreham, Shoreham-by-Sea; 50.8416°N 0.2837°W	II	One of a few old cottages to survive in Old Shoreham as urbanisation increased, this has 16th-century origins as a small yeoman farmhouse and has been tree-ring dated to construction in 1583 with two floors and a central brick chimney. It was divided into two in the 18th century. Timber framing survives inside, and a small exposed section is visible on the outside; red brickwork, plaster infill and flint predominate otherwise. The roof is thatched. Both floors have five windows.	
Old Malt Cottage	A wide stone cottage with a deep thatched roof illuminated by low sunlight. Two small rectangular windows can be seen on the right of the building, next to some trees and a car. A bush, fence and the roof obscure most of the rest of the cottage. There is a small chimney-stack on the left.	Old Shoreham, Shoreham-by-Sea; 50.8395°N 0.2846°W	II	This 17th-century thatched-roofed barn was turned into a pair of cottages in the 20th century. The roof extends forward a long way, obscuring much of the 1½-storey façade—especially on the left side, which only has windows on the ground floor.	
Old School House	Three-quarter view of an L-shaped, steep-roofed stone building with three very deep-set windows: one wide, tall lancet to the left, and a slightly shorter lancet and a round trefoil to the right. There is a centrally placed chimneypot. In the roof to the left of the round window is a modern skylight. The building is partly hidden by a flint wall, gate and shrub.	Old Shoreham, Shoreham-by-Sea; 50.8404°N 0.2854°W	II	Old Shoreham's former village school is now three houses. The cruciform Gothic Revival building still has lancet and trefoil windows with tracery. The walls, of flint cobblestones and brown brick, stand on a plinth of cement.	
Old Shoreham Farmhouse		Old Shoreham, Shoreham-by-Sea; 50.8407°N 0.2842°W	II	Now a private house, this early-18th-century farmhouse has cobbled flintwork and yellow brickwork to the quoins and windows. The mansard roof has a chimney at one end. The three-bay façade has three regularly spaced sash windows.	
Red Lion Inn		Old Shoreham, Shoreham-by-Sea; 50.8401°N 0.2858°W	II	This 18th-century inn, a long building with several later extensions, faces Shoreham Tollbridge. The L-shaped plaster-covered building rises no higher than 1½ storeys. Alfred, Lord Tennyson's poem Rizpah was based on a robbery which was discovered after the criminals' conversation was overheard in the inn.	
The Amsterdam		Old Shoreham, Shoreham-by-Sea; 50.8397°N 0.2856°W	II	This is now a public house, but it began its life as a house in the early 18th century. The mansard roof has two asymmetrically placed chimneys. The walls are flint and cobblestone with brick quoins. All windows are casements with diamond latticework.	
Tudor Cottage		Old Shoreham, Shoreham-by-Sea; 50.8396°N 0.2853°W	II	Built in the 16th century and still in residential use, this building has a thatched roof with steep tiled extensions towards ground level, a single chimney at one end, casement windows and render-coated timber framing.	
6–12 West Street	Three-quarter view of a row of two-storey cottages with tiled roofs, large chimneys, irregular cobblestone façades (lit by sunlight) and large rectangular windows at intervals. Parked cars partly obscure the view of each building.	Shoreham-by-Sea; 50.8328°N 0.2777°W	II	Four terraced cottages of the 18th century are grouped together in this listing. This part of Shoreham-by-Sea, with densely packed houses on north–south streets, was known as "Trinidad" in that era, and the dark cobbled flints used for the walls are called "kidney" or "bullseye" flints. Brick dressings, sash windows and eaves with a dentil pattern are also visible.	
9–11 Church Street		Shoreham-by-Sea; 50.8322°N 0.2754°W	II	A date of 1750 has been attributed to this pair of houses. They have connections to the Pelhams, a Sussex baronetcy. They were later acquired by a local man who built the rest of Church Street around them. A painted brick course spans the cobblestone façade. The houses have one and two dormers respectively.	
15 Middle Street		Shoreham-by-Sea; 50.8327°N 0.2757°W	II	Older than its neighbours, this narrow mid-18th-century house has a red tiled front wall which is buttressed at the corner. This belonged to an adjoining building which has been demolished, revealing a painted side wall. The two-storey cottage also has attic space with a dormer window.	
16 West Street	Three-quarter view of an end-of-terrace two-storey cottage with a tiled roof, side chimney-stack, irregular cobblestone façade (lit by sunlight) and wide windows with red-brick surrounds. Parked cars partly obscure the view.	Shoreham-by-Sea; 50.8329°N 0.2777°W	II	This is joined to Ramshackle Cottage (number 14) but is built of different materials: dark "kidney" flints and red-brick dressings. It may not be the original front. The building, with two storeys, a steep tiled roof and a two-window range, dates from the early 18th century.	
18 Church Street		Shoreham-by-Sea; 50.8331°N 0.2735°W	II	The building lost its cast-iron railings during World War II, but retains its old flint façade and deep painted parapet. Set behind this is a steep roof with a chimney to the rear. The doorcase has a pedimented hood mould. The 18th-century building was extended to the rear with a private schoolroom.	
20 Church Street		Shoreham-by-Sea; 50.8324°N 0.2750°W	II	Originally part of a single listing with number 18, this house of 1754 is now listed separately. Its flint and painted brick exterior is similar to that of its neighbour, but it is not as tall and has a slate, not tiled, roof. There are four corner windows and a blank window above the off-centre door, which has a flat hoodmould and a date stone.	
22 Church Street	A wide, cobblestone-fronted house with a mansard roof with two dormer windows, a chimneypot, five large, evenly-spaced windows with white-painted brick surrounds and a recessed door with a porch. It is joined to a house of similar height on the left and a much shorter building on the right.	Shoreham-by-Sea; 50.8325°N 0.2750°W	II	Built in around 1780 and extended about 70 years later, this tall cobbled house with brick string-coursing, quoins and window surrounds, was used by Nathaniel Woodard (founder of Lancing College) at the time he started his movement to educate middle-class children. The mansard roof is of slate and has two dormer windows and a chimney.	
23 John Street		Shoreham-by-Sea; 50.8332°N 0.2766°W	II	Although now a self-contained building, this was originally part of Shoreham House, whose wall obscures the façade. The two-storey house has a single-window range with sash windows. The roof sits behind a stuccoed parapet and a cornice of brick. The main building material is pale brick made of Gault clay.	
23–25 High Street		Shoreham-by-Sea; 50.8316°N 0.2756°W	II	These mid-18th-century cottages have older interiors; Number 25's may date from 1641, according to a stone tablet inside. It also has a steep rear roof (to protect against storms) and traces of the original shopfront. Number 23, originally called Stone House and at one time the town's post office, retains its original timber framing, door and porch.	
24 Church Street	Three-quarter view of a tall, wide, two-storey, cobblestone-fronted house with a mansard roof with two dormer windows, a chimneypot, one round and four square windows with white-painted brick surrounds, a deeply recessed arched entrance and a wide, pointed-arched, gated entrance. The side elevation has four windows and is slightly recessed at ground-floor level.	Shoreham-by-Sea; 50.8326°N 0.2749°W	II	This house, on the east side of Church Street, dates from about 1750. Its wide façade has a three-window range, but in place of the lower left window is a carriage-arch with a segmental head, which gives access to a courtyard. The window above this is round. Dark cobblestones are the main building material, but there are red-brick quoins and string-courses and a brick cornice below the slate-tiled mansard roof. White-painted brickwork also surrounds the windows. The two-storey building also has attic rooms with dormer windows.	
30–32 John Street	Three-quarter view of a white-painted cottage with a brown tiled roof, three first-floor windows and a pedimented doorcase flanked by two windows on the ground floor. It is attached to a pale yellow building on the left; this is slightly taller and has square corner windows. To the right, a single-storey building with a long sloping roof shares a wall.	Shoreham-by-Sea; 50.8329°N 0.2763°W	II		
35–36 East Street	Three-quarter view of a two-storey red-brick and cobbled flint building on a corner site. The ground floor is occupied by four shop units, of which a café called "Famished" is most prominent. At first-floor level, the right-hand face has five evenly-spaced windows with red-brick surrounds. The gable end of the roof, which forms the larger part of the left-hand face, is blank apart from two small windows. Beyond this, there is a three-window range in a wall of dark brickwork at first-floor level.	Shoreham-by-Sea; 50.8331°N 0.2735°W	II		
46–54 West Street	A row of short cottages with four evenly-spaced doors opening on to a low pavement. Beyond the furthest cottage is a taller, blank-walled house with a wide, tall chimney, and six other chimney-pots are at least partly visible. The cottages have identical dark cobblestone walls and red-brick dressings around the windows and between the lower and upper storeys.	Shoreham-by-Sea; 50.8338°N 0.2774°W	II	Row of five Georgian cottages with coursed cobblestone and red brick quoins band and dressings and slate roofs. Likely to have been built between 1825 – 1832 on land that was previously an orchard (unlikely to have been built in 1775 as stated on a sign, as they do not appear on maps from that period). The old hemp store building at the corner of North Street adjoining the cottages (used by rope makers) pre-dates the cottages. The cottages were built on land belonging to William Ratcliff (glazier & painter) and remained in the Ratcliff family until 1931 generation after generation – when they were used as rental properties for workers in local trades – including mariners, rope makers, laundresses, and coal carters. The Ratcliff family were owners of various residential and commercial properties in New Shoreham and this contributed to their income and modest wealth. Although the cottages have had diamond lattice casement windows since the point when they were listed, they would have originally had sash windows. Up to the mid 20thC the cottages shared one flushing privy and it is likely the garden area was a communal space. A 1968 newspaper clipping reveals that the three cottages in the row that were auctioned in 1931 (numbers 50, 52 and 54) were modernised at that time, the fate of the remaining two cottages (numbers 46 and 48) was different – as they were 'rescued' in 1968 by the Historic Shoreham Trust. In September 1972 the cottage row was awarded a Grade II listing by English Heritage, and West Street has been included in the Shoreham Conservation Area since 2007–8. This row of cottages would have had a collective name, as per other local rows of cottages such as May Cottages and Trinidad Row in the same street. Possible names for this particular row of cottages are cited as Sugden Place or Jamaica Terrace – although further investigation into the name is being carried out and this cannot yet be confirmed.	
53 Southdown Road		Shoreham-by-Sea; 50.8371°N 0.2762°W	II	The stuccoed exterior of this three-storey house dates from the mid-19th century, but the building is a century older. A two-storey, single-bay extension was added on the south side in the 20th century; the original building has a three-bay façade with regularly spaced sash windows and moulded courses between each storey. The first- and second-floor windows have moulded pilasters next to them, and the middle window on the first floor is blank.	
55–57 New Road		Shoreham-by-Sea; 50.8329°N 0.2704°W	II		
74 and 76 High Street	Three-quarter view of a wide, squat cottage with a roof of large, irregular tiles. The side wall, to the left, has a prominent chimney-stack, a long, sloping rear roofline, one large and two small windows, a street sign and a black board reading "The Indian Cottage Tandoori Restaurant", but is otherwise plain white. The main façade has five small windows at first-floor level, four larger windows on the ground floor, a wide doorway and various signs and banners.	Shoreham-by-Sea; 50.8325°N 0.2779°W	II	Formerly known as the Queen Anne Restaurant, apparently referring to the date of 1706 carved on the exterior, these cottages are probably 16th-century, and are therefore among the oldest in the town. The original timber framing was clad in plaster and cement, and an original inglenook remains inside.	
Church House	Front view of a white two-storey house with exterior signage indicating it is in commercial use. There are three rectangular windows on the upper storey, two on the lower storey flanking an entrance porch and door with arched fanlight, and a small, off-centre dormer window in the tiled roof.	Shoreham-by-Sea; 50.8328°N 0.2736°W	II	The adjacent shops on East Street were built in this mid-18th-century house's orchard. The rendered exterior and parapetted doorcase were 20th-century additions. The door has a wooden architrave and semicircular fanlight, and there is a range of three sash windows.	
Cobblestones	Almost side-on view of a long, two-storey house with two gable ends, large areas of tiles, a white ground floor and a flint section nearest the camera (with arched recess and brick buttress). Two tall chimneys rise from the roof. A low, narrow pavement with bollards runs alongside.	Shoreham-by-Sea; 50.8333°N 0.2738°W	II	One of two original houses on this road opposite St Mary de Haura Church, this was overhauled in the early 20th century. It now has a flint, red-brick and stucco exterior, a tiled roof with chimneys on both sides and some jettying on the south face. The gable-end facing the road suggests medieval or older origins, but the structure is essentially 18th-century.	
Corner Cottage, Crispins and Trinity Cottage		Shoreham-by-Sea; 50.8376°N 0.2756°W	II	These three cottages make up a short terrace on the corner of Mill Lane and Southdown Road. Each has two storeys and a dormer window so large it is more like a gable. The roof is continuous across all three houses and is tiled. Chimneys rise from ground level to the left and in the centre. All windows are sashes. The window layout is irregular.	
Former Dovecote at Buckingham Farm		Shoreham-by-Sea; 50.8421°N 0.2737°W	II	Part of the old Buckingham Farm and dating from the 18th century, this squat, square structure is built of cobblestones laid in courses and has red-brick quoins. The hipped roof is laid with Horsham Stone.	
Former St Peter's Church	Side view of a tall, narrow flint building with a steeply-pitched red-tiled roof in which several skylights have been inserted at irregular intervals. Four identical lancet window openings with modern windows, separated by buttresses, dominate the near side; an identical window is visible on the recessed side wall behind it. A stone bell-tower rises from the left-hand side, and below it a porch projects forward a short way.	Shoreham-by-Sea; 50.8327°N 0.2769°W	II	In the mid-19th century, a former Anglican vicar donated land for a Roman Catholic church, and the Duchess of Norfolk gave money. Charles Buckler designed the church, which opened in 1875. The Decorated Gothic Revival flint and ashlar structure has a bellcote on the gabled tiled roof. After a new church was built nearby, the building was sold in 1982 and converted into a nursing home.	
K6 Telephone Kiosk, East Street	Three-quarter view of a red telephone booth with a glass door with red metal bars (partly in shadow) and a slightly domed roof. Behind it stand a flint wall, gravestones, a wooden bench and a tall stone war memorial.	Shoreham-by-Sea; 50.8325°N 0.2742°W	II	This is an example of the standard K6 style of telephone booth designed by Giles Gilbert Scott in 1935. It is glazed on all four sides, built of red-painted cast iron and topped with a shallow dome-style roof.	
Manor House		Shoreham-by-Sea; 50.8326°N 0.2752°W	II		
North Cottage	Close-up view of a two-storey, four-window, semi-detached cottage in dark, irregular stone with red brickwork around the walls, windows and door. There is a flat shelf-like white structure above the black door. A white-painted chimney sits on the left side of the roof.	Shoreham-by-Sea; 50.8338°N 0.2773°W	II	This building dates from the 1830s and is faced with irregular cobblestones known as kidney flints. The roof has brick eaves and is covered with pantiles, and the door is original. The ground-floor windows are modern, however. There are chimneys at both ends of the roof.	
Old Scantlings	Front view of a dark stone house slightly set back from a street corner. A tiled roof with a dormer window and chimney sits above a white-painted parapet, and six irregularly spaced windows also have white surrounds. The wide, pale blue door, offset to the left, has pillars on each side and a white diamond panel above.	Shoreham-by-Sea; 50.8327°N 0.2753°W	II	This cottage has stood on the west side of Church Street since the mid-18th century. It rises to two storeys and has a wide gabled dormer in the slate-tiled roof, which also has a painted chimney on the left. There are three casement windows on each floor and a left-oriented moulded timber entrance porch with a straight-arched hood mould.	
Old Swan Cottages		Shoreham-by-Sea; 50.8330°N 0.2753°W	II		
Ramshackle Cottage	A small, two-storey flint cottage with a steep tiled roof, attached to another of the same height to the left. It has a white door and four irregularly spaced windows (edged in red brick), the upper two of which have window-boxes. A white gate is set into a flint wall attached to the right side of the cottage.	Shoreham-by-Sea; 50.8330°N 0.2776°W	II		
Royal Sovereign		Shoreham-by-Sea; 50.8324°N 0.2759°W	II		
Ruins of Buckingham House		Shoreham-by-Sea; 50.8416°N 0.2693°W	II	George Moore's novel Esther Waters was set at this mansion, which was also the subject of a painting now in the British Museum. John Rebecca rebuilt an older structure in about 1820; since its destruction by fire in 1910 it has stood derelict. The pale brick, two-storey structure has three-window ranges, Corinthian columns and stone pilasters topped by elaborate capitals.	
Shoreham Court		Shoreham-by-Sea; 50.8381°N 0.2746°W	II		
Shoreham House	Three-quarter view of a wide two-storey house in pale brick. The left side wall is plain white with a slightly projecting chimney-breast. To the right, on the main façade, is a three-window, two-storey projection with a curved parapet slightly above the roofline. Beyond this, there is a three-window range at first-floor level between a long, flat parapet and a pair of round-headed ground-floor windows flanking a pedimented doorcase.	Shoreham-by-Sea; 50.8330°N 0.2766°W	II	Soldiers enlisted here for war in 1914, and later uses included a ratepayers' office. The building, dating from about 1820 with an 1880s extension to the south, is now residential. Built of pale brick with Gault clay from Worthing, it has a three-window range to the original (north) part, in which the pediment-topped entrance door is centrally placed, and three narrower windows to the projecting extension, which is taller and has a Dutch gable.	
Shoreham-by-Sea Town Hall	A pale grey, two-storey building with a narrow parapet and off-centre pediment, below which is the lettering "TOWN HALL". There are darker grey pilasters flanking three first-floor windows and the door on the ground floor (in a doorcase with a hood above, supporting a carved lion and unicorn). Two banners reading "CHAMBERS BISTRO" are fixed to the pilasters. Cars are parked in front.	Shoreham-by-Sea; 50.8319°N 0.2768°W	II	Sydney Smirke designed this Classical-style stuccoed building as a custom house in 1830. It became the town hall in 1886, and is now a restaurant. The three-bay façade has pilasters supporting a frieze and pediment; the frieze bears the inscription town hall. Another bay extends to the right of the entrance.	
St John's, 34 John Street		Shoreham-by-Sea; 50.8331°N 0.2763°W	II		
St Mary's House		Shoreham-by-Sea; 50.8334°N 0.2734°W	II	Former residents of this early-18th-century two-storey house include Nathaniel Woodard and the Royal Navy officer Henry Roberts. The oak staircase inside is considered particularly impressive. The exterior is plastered and has sash windows, an Ionic columned porch and a gabled roof.	
Barn at Halewick Farm		Sompting; 50.8398°N 0.3367°W	II		
Brooklands		Sompting; 50.8345°N 0.3534°W	II		
Church Farmhouse		Sompting; 50.8391°N 0.3515°W	II		
Halewick Farmhouse		Sompting; 50.8397°N 0.3364°W	II		
Lychpole Farmhouse		Sompting; 50.8566°N 0.3590°W	II		
Myrtle Cottage		Sompting; 50.8350°N 0.3544°W	II		
Old Rectory		Sompting; 50.8348°N 0.3428°W	II		
Sompting Abbots		Sompting; 50.8395°N 0.3499°W	II		
Sompting Peverel		Sompting; 50.8372°N 0.3520°W	II		
The Hermitage		Sompting; 50.8355°N 0.3520°W	II		
Yew Tree House		Sompting; 50.8346°N 0.3448°W	II		
11 Southwick Street	Front view of a joined pair of cottages standing behind a low flint wall. A bush obscures the right-hand side of the façade, and there is a white-painted extension on the left. The rest of the building is of irregular flint with some brickwork. There are chimneys at each end of the tiled roof.	Southwick; 50.8336°N 0.2353°W	II	Built in the 17th century as part of a farm, this building was later divided into two cottages but is now a single residence. The timber-framed structure has a flint and brick exterior topped by a tiled hipped roof. The four-window range is made up of casements.	
17–19 Southwick Street	Front view of two joined flint two-storey cottages with white wooden doors next to each other under a shared tiled hood. There are two ground-floor bow windows and two tall rectangular windows above. The red-tiled roof has chimneys at each end; the right-hand one is much taller, while the left-hand one is painted white. There is a low white fence in front.	Southwick; 50.8337°N 0.2352°W	II	This early-18th-century house has been split into two dwellings. The doors are next to each other beneath a shared sloping hood mould. The ground floor has two bay windows; above, two sashes flank a blocked window. The building is of cobblestone and brick construction and has a tiled roof.	
20 Southwick Street		Southwick; 50.8348°N 0.2344°W	II	Formerly Manor Farm House, this timber-framed cottage is now occupied by a doctor's surgery. The main building material is flint, but there are red-brick quoins, window surrounds and eaves. The tiled roof has two chimneys and a partly hipped south end. There are three unevenly spaced casement windows and an off-centre door under a sloping pentice.	
21 Southwick Street	Front view of a cobbled flint building with two storeys and a high tiled roof. The ground floor has two windows and a green door; there are three evenly-spaced windows above. All windows are surrounded by red-brick dressings. Bicycle racks and metal grab-rails are on the pavement in front. There are two very short chimneys on the roof.	Southwick; 50.8338°N 0.2351°W	II	Adur District Council now use this early-18th-century house as an office. The tall two-storey building, in dark cobblestones and red brick, has sash windows, a centrally placed bolection-moulded doorway, and a mansard roof with two chimneys.	
41 The Green		Southwick; 50.8341°N 0.2392°W	II	This two-storey cottage has been dated to either the 17th or the mid-18th century. The tiled roof has brick gabled ends with chimneys and a cornice. The walls are rendered, but there is also some flintwork. A single-storey extension on the south side is also of flint. The ground floor has oriel windows.	
43–45 The Green		Southwick; 50.8342°N 0.2391°W	II	This pair of cottages form an architectural group with their neighbour at number 41. The façades are plastered and have four evenly spaced windows each: sashes to the first floor, oriels below. The red tiled roof has brick eaves and a cornice.	
Ivy Lodge		Southwick; 50.8346°N 0.2391°W	II	Although altered and extended since its mid-18th-century construction, this house (formerly called St George's) retains many original features. It has a cobblestone and painted brick façade below a parapet with coping and a tiled mansard roof which supports chimneypots at each end. The three-window range includes a single central sash window.	
King Charles' Cottage		Southwick; 50.8351°N 0.2390°W	II	This is a shortened version of the traditional Sussex open hall-house plan, built in the 16th century and later converted into a cottage. A chimney has been added to the northern gable end; the southern end of the roof is hipped. A crown post roof survives inside the timber-framed structure.	
Manor Cottage	A flint building on a corner site, with a grassed area and leafless tree in front. Behind the tree is a windowless section with a steep tiled roof reaching nearly to the ground; to the right is an extension with two wide, flat, slightly arched windows and a red door. There is a square window in the side wall on the far right.	Southwick; 50.8345°N 0.2344°W	II	Standing north of the Manor House is a low, long, timber-framed open hall-house dating from the 15th century. The flint and red-brick building, altered in the 17th century, has a clay and slate tile roof. Internal timber-framing survives. The cottage is now a museum.	
Manor House		Southwick; 50.8343°N 0.2345°W	II		
Old Rectory		Southwick; 50.8355°N 0.2435°W	II		
Old Rectory Cottage		Southwick; 50.8354°N 0.2441°W	II		
Sussex Yacht Club Boat Store		Southwick; 50.8313°N 0.2343°W	II	John Vallance, member of a Hove brewing family, built this harbourside structure in 1816 as a malthouse. The partly weatherboarded cobbled flint and brick two-storey building, with a six-part hipped roof, was bought in 1926 by the recently founded yacht club, and became their premises.	
Southwick Community Centre		Southwick; 50.8352°N 0.2343°W	II	The building used to be the homestead of Manor Farm, and has had little alteration since its 16th- or 17th-century construction. It is mostly flint, but with ashlar dressings and quoins, red brick window surrounds and some bargeboards on one gable end. The tiled roof has two large chimneys.	
Wall south of Manor House		Southwick; 50.8340°N 0.2348°W	II	This 19th-century wall, possibly ornamental rather than functional in origin, is 8 by 16 feet (2 m × 5 m) and consists of brick-edged cobbled stonework. It is buttressed at one end and also has two archways.	
War Memorial, The Green		Southwick; 50.8329°N 0.2388°W	II	This concrete, granite and slag obelisk commemorates local casualties of the two World Wars. Designed by a local man and unveiled in 1922, it has four plaques of limestone and bronze above its plinth. It is 15 feet (4.6 m) tall and sits on a stepped concrete terrace.	

== Delisted buildings ==
Buildings are sometimes removed from the statutory list.

Name	Image	Location and Coordinates	Grade	Notes	Refs
Toll House		Shoreham-by-Sea; 50.8323°N 0.2789°W	II	When Norfolk Bridge was built across the Adur in 1833, a tollhouse was needed. The low single-storey structure, plastered and painted white, is now a house: toll collection ceased in 1927. The roof hides behind a parapet and coping, through which pilasters extend from ground level. The door is set in a hood-moulded porch. English Heritage delisted it on 3 September 2010.	
