= St James the Less Church, Lancing =

St James the Less Church
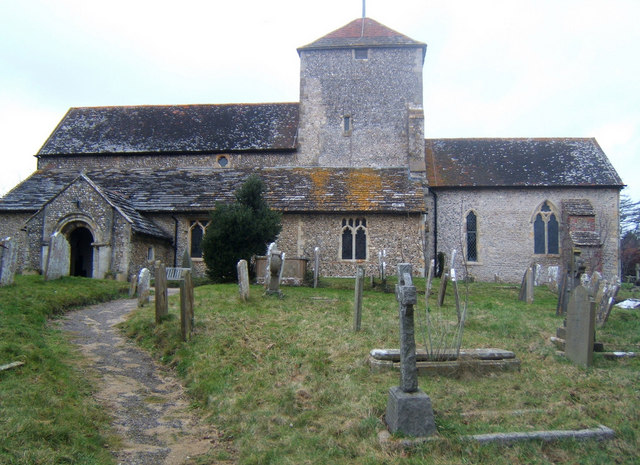
- The church from the south
- St James the Less Church
- 50.8379°N 0.3226°W
- Location: Manor Road, North Lancing, Lancing, West Sussex BN15 0EY
- Country: England
- Denomination: Church of England
- Churchmanship: Anglo-Catholic
- Website: https://www.chalkspringchurches.org/st-james-the-less

History
- Status: Parish church of Lancing with Coombes
- Founded: 12th century
- Dedication: St James the Less

Architecture
- Functional status: Active
- Heritage designation: Grade I
- Designated: 12 October 1954
- Style: Early English/Decorated Gothic (Transitional)

Administration
- Diocese: Chichester
- Archdeaconry: Chichester
- Deanery: Rural Deanery of Worthing
- Parish: Lancing, St James the Less

Clergy
- Vicar: Vacancy

St James the Less Church is the Anglican parish church of Lancing with Coombes, an ancient village which has been absorbed into the modern town of Lancing in the district of Adur, one of seven local government districts in the English county of West Sussex. It was founded in the 12th century in the most northerly of the three settlements in Lancing parish, which has Saxon origins. The present building is mostly 13th-century in appearance, and structural work has been carried out several times since—particularly in the 18th and 19th centuries, when the church was restored from a ruinous condition. English Heritage has listed the church at Grade I for its architectural and historical importance.

== History ==
The name Lancing suggests Saxon influence (the -ing suffix implied, in Saxon terms, a temporary settlement), and remains dating from the 6th century have been found nearby. At the time of the Domesday survey in 1086, the Lord of the manor of nearby Broadwater, Robert le Savage, held the manor of Lancing. The land in the parish, which extended from the South Downs to the English Channel coast, was chiefly agricultural.

Around this time, the large manor was divided into several smaller ones, of which North Lancing and South Lancing (as they became known) were the most important. Gradually, three settlements developed: North Lancing, closest to the Downs; South Lancing, near the coast; and the nearby Pende (now vanished), on the coast and briefly a successful port. No church existed in the area at that time, but one was established in North Lancing in the 12th century: a date of around 1120 has been suggested from analysis of surviving masonry at the ends of the chancel. In about 1180, an arched doorway, now forming part of the porch on the south side, was added.

The whole structure was rebuilt between about 1280 and 1300, giving the church its present layout. It presents a consistent and harmonious architectural impression, despite the long period of time needed to complete the work. A stair turret leading up to the tower was built in the 15th century; part of the north aisle had to be blocked to accommodate this.

In the 17th century—especially after the Restoration of 1660—Anglican religious worship declined and many churches in England fell into disrepair. This attitude was common among the people of Sussex, where church attendances declined dramatically in many villages, including North Lancing. The first sign of structural decay at St James the Less Church came in 1618, when the upper part of the tower collapsed. By 1621 it had been repaired by cutting it down in size and topping it with a "Sussex cap"-style roof. The rest of the building quickly fell into ruins, however: birds were found to be nesting inside, pigeons bred there and the font was empty. By 1662, the church could no longer be used.

The situation improved in the late 18th century, when some restoration work was carried out. More substantial rebuilding in 1827 added extra pews and altered several windows. The most recent addition was a vestry in 1934.

== Architecture ==
The church is built of flint cobblestones. Areas of pebbledashing remain, although some was removed in the mid-20th century. Ashlar has been used as well. Architecturally, the timing and completeness of the late 13th-century rebuilding has resulted in the church presenting an unusually complete example of the transition from the Early English Gothic style to the Decorated Gothic style.

The church has, from west to east, a three-bay nave with aisles on the north and south sides, a short tower and a chancel with a lower roofline than the nave. There is a porch with an entrance doorway on the south side, another door at the west end and a vestry at the northeast corner as well.

Until its collapse in 1618, the tower was much taller and ended in a parapet. The reconstruction shortened it (making the upper windows smaller) and added a Sussex cap—a shallow pyramid-shaped slate roof common in Sussex. The date was commemorated by an inscription on the north wall. The church's original entrance doorway has been retained in the south porch: it has a round arch carried on chamfered shafts with Norman-style capitals. The detail on the stonework, although characteristic of the Norman period, is more intricate than usual. The arch has a hood mould, which sits clear of the abaci at the top of the shafts. Inside the doorway is an ancient stoup for holy water, which is now in poor condition. The other doorway, in the west face, is similar to its south-face counterpart, but is more likely to be 15th-century than 12th-century. Buttresses seem to have been added around the tower at some point during the 17th century, and a large buttress remains on the south side of the chancel. This was thought to be hollow until it was analysed properly in 1948 when pebbledashing was removed from the exterior.

Most of the windows are either one- or two-light Decorated Gothic, although some later examples are in the Perpendicular Gothic style. Some of the chancel windows are larger, with three lights. Stained glass, by an unknown designer, was installed in three windows in 1866.

Inside the church, remnants of the original Norman building can be seen at opposite ends: in the west wall of the nave and the east end of the chancel. The chancel, nave and aisles were rebuilt (to the same dimensions as the original building) when English Gothic architecture was at its height, and the chamfered arches, octagonal pillars, chancel arch, blind arches and mouldings are considered good examples of their kind. The king post roof of the nave has also been praised.

Interior fittings include a 14th-century Easter sepulchre with an ogee-arched roof, part of a sedilia, some Norman friezework, and a 12th-century square font in good condition.

== Today ==
St James the Less Church was listed at Grade I by English Heritage on 12 October 1954. Such buildings are defined as being of "exceptional interest" and greater than national importance. As of February 2001, it was one of seven Grade I listed buildings, and 119 listed buildings of all grades, in Adur district.

The style of worship in the church is Traditional Anglo-Catholic. A Said Mass is celebrated every Wednesday at 11am and the Sung Parish Mass every Sunday at 10.30am with music led by the organ and choir; all are welcome.

The parish, in its present form, covers 2,236 acres (905 ha). The eastern boundary is the River Adur; the railway line between the river and Leconfield Road forms the southern limit; on the west side, the ancient boundary with Sompting parish, now running up Boundstone Lane and Upper Boundstone Lane, is retained; and old field boundaries on the South Downs have been preserved in the north.

== See also ==
- List of places of worship in Adur
