= Shoreham Tollbridge =

Bridge crossing the River Adur in West Sussex, England

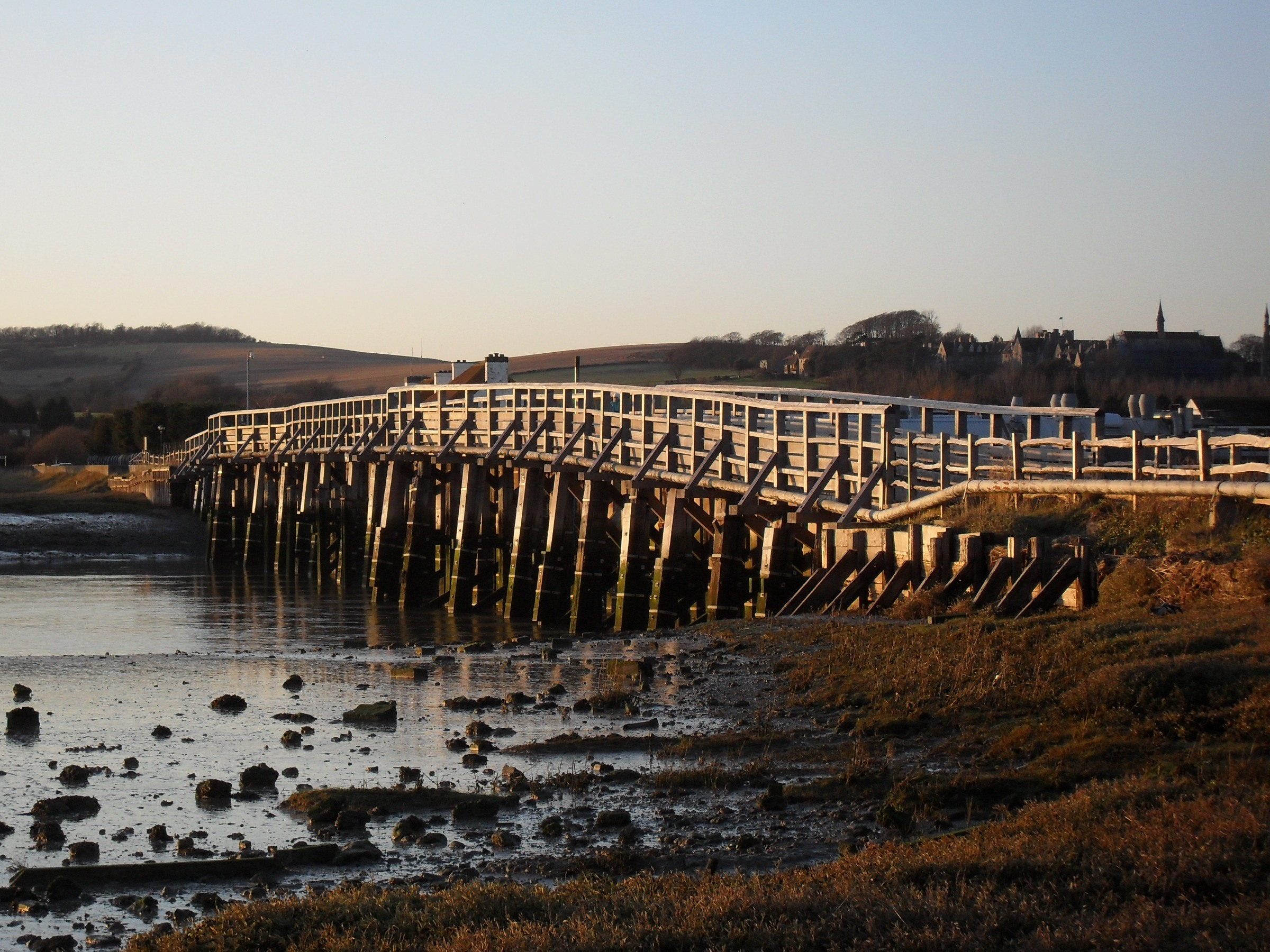
- The bridge from the east bank at Old Shoreham Road
- Coordinates: 50°50′26.2″N 0°17′18.2″W
- Crosses: River Adur
- Locale: Shoreham and Lancing, West Sussex, England

History
- Opened: 1782
- Closed: 1970 to road traffic

Listed Building – Grade II*
- Official name: Old Shoreham Bridge
- Designated: 12 October 1954
- Reference no.: 1027895

Location
- Interactive map of Shoreham Tollbridge

Shoreham Tollbridge is a bridge crossing the River Adur near Shoreham-by-Sea in West Sussex, England. It is the last of its kind in Sussex and one of the last of its kind anywhere in the world.

== Old Shoreham Tollbridge ==
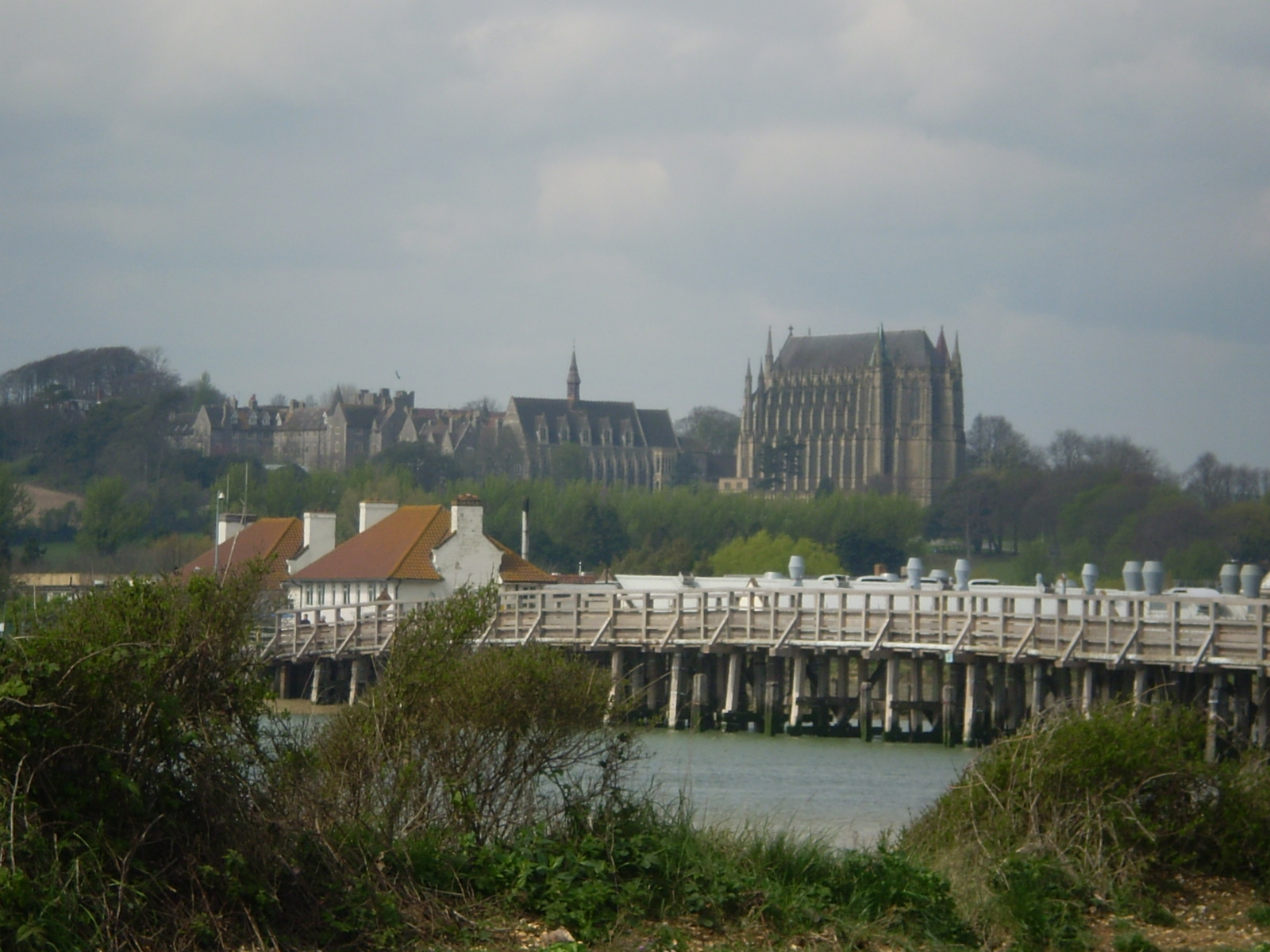
Reconstructed Shoreham Tollbridge

The 18th and 19th centuries saw the construction of a great many structures in England. Canals, harbour schemes, railways, roads and bridges were all built. What is now known as the Old Shoreham Tollbridge was built during this period over the River Adur between Shoreham and Lancing. Before the building of the bridge in 1781–82, the Adur presented the one major obstacle to east–west communication along the coastal plain of Southern England. The choices open to the traveller wishing to cross the Adur were to travel miles out of the way and use the bridge at Bramber, to ford the river on horseback or to use the ferry that was operating at that time on the site of what is now the bridge. Whilst little is known about the operation of the ferry it must have been a daunting prospect as it was later described as 'dangerous and frequently impassable' in the act of parliament authorising the construction of the bridge.

== Act of Parliament ==
Old Shoreham Bridge Act 1781
- Act of Parliament
- Parliament of Great Britain
- Long title: An Act for building a Bridge over the River Adur, at or near Old Shoreham, in the County of Sussex.
- Citation: 21 Geo. 3. c. 35
- Territorial extent: Great Britain

Dates
- Royal assent: 18 May 1781
- Commencement: 31 October 1780 (Note: Start of session.)
Other legislation
Relates to	Brighton and Chichester Railway Act 1844; London, Brighton and South Coast Railway Act 1860

Status: Current legislation

Text of statute as originally enacted

The construction of Old Shoreham Tollbridge was authorised by the Old Shoreham Bridge Act 1781 (21 Geo. 3. c. 35). The act established a body of trustees to construct 'a proper and substantial Bridge, for the Passage of Carriages... over the said River, at or near the said Ferry'. The new wooden bridge was 10 months in the making and first opened to public traffic in March 1782.

== Financing ==
From the beginning, the bridge was to be financially self-supporting. Money was to be raised in two ways. Firstly by the issue of 50 share units held on a life annuity basis, by which £5,000 was raised by 36 subscribers. Secondly by the imposition of a toll on all foot passengers and animal and vehicular traffic using the bridge. The early tolls were:

For every Coach, Chariot, Chaise, Hearse, or other such like Carriage, with four Wheels, One Shilling; and for every Horse or other Beast drawing the same, Sixpence:

For every Chaise, Chair, or other such like Carriage, with Two Wheels, Sixpence; and for every Horse or other Beast drawing the same, Sixpence:

For every Wagon or Wain, One Shilling; and for every Horse or other Beast drawing the same, Threepence:

For every Cart, Ninepence; and for every Horse or other Beast drawing the same Threepence:

For every Horse, Mare, Gelding, Mule or Ass, laden or unladen, and not drawing, Threepence:

For every score of Oxen, Cows, or Neat Cattle, One Shilling and Eightpence:and so in Proportion for any less Number:

For every Score of Calves, Hogs, Sheep or Lambs, Tenpence; and so in Proportion for any less Number:

And for every Foot Passenger, One Halfpenny

== Ownership ==
The bridge remained in private trusteeship for the first 80 years. The bridge was then taken over by the London, Brighton and South Coast Railway Company on the opening of the Steyning Line from Shoreham to Horsham in 1861. The bridge was completely rebuilt by the company during the First World War, retaining the original 18th-century design. In The Railway Magazine for January–February 1946, it was stated that "It may be remarked here that the Shoreham-Horsham branch crosses the highway on the level at the Old Shoreham end of the wooden bridge, where a block signal box is provided. The signalmen, in addition to attending to the level-crossing gates, collect the tolls from vehicles crossing this old wooden bridge."

The bridge carried the coastal trunk road – the A27 road – until 1970, when its successor was built a quarter-of-a-mile to the north, as a part of the re-routing of the A27.

The British Railways Board finally closed the bridge to road traffic on 7 December 1970. At the time the bridge closed, it was the last public road bridge in Sussex to be controlled by a toll. The bridge was transferred to the ownership of West Sussex County Council. The bridge has since been classified as a Grade II* listed building and is preserved as a building of historic interest.

== Present day ==
During 2008 the bridge underwent a major refurbishment with the aim of extending its life for a further 30 years. The bridge has now been designated a bridleway and is a popular local landmark used by both leisure and commuter traffic on foot, bicycle and horseback. It is also a popular spot for local fishermen. The refurbishment completely replaced the pilehead crossbeams, deck support longitudinal beams and handrails with selective replacement and reinforcement of components of each of the 27 pile bents. The project was managed and partly funded by West Sussex County Council. The rest of the funding came from the Heritage Lottery Fund, landfill tax credits and the Old Shoreham Tollbridge Community Trust.

The bridge was listed at Grade II* by English Heritage on 12 October 1954. Such buildings are defined as being "particularly important ... [and] of more than special interest". As of February 2001, it was one of seven Grade II* listed buildings, and 119 listed buildings of all grades, in Adur district.

== See also ==
- Grade II* listed buildings in West Sussex
