= Marlipins Museum =

Listed building in West Sussex, England

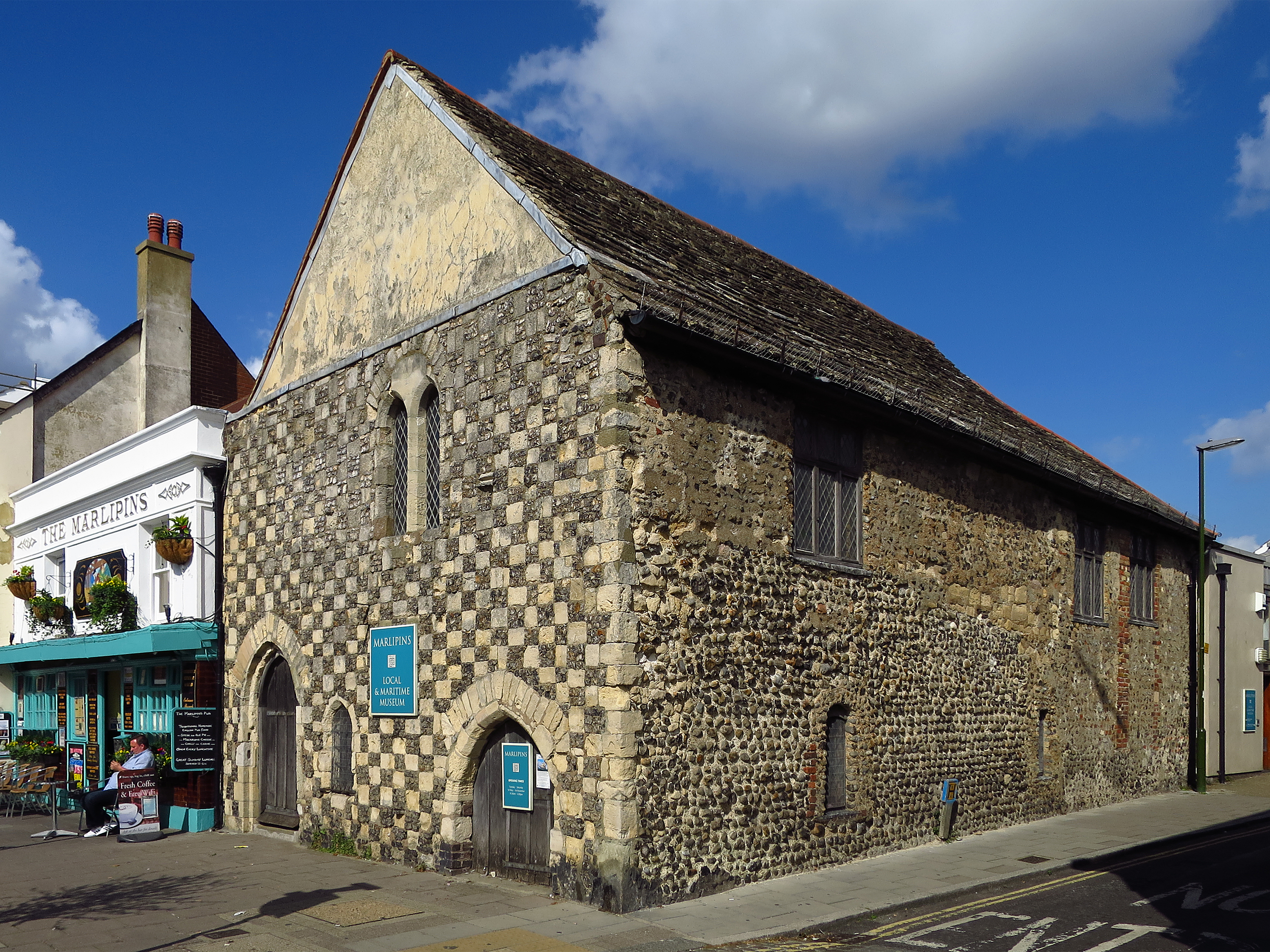
- The building from the southeast

- Location within West Sussex

General information
- Architectural style: Norman
- Location: 36 High Street, Shoreham-by-Sea, West Sussex, England
- Coordinates: 50°49′55.18″N 0°16′34.25″W
- Year built: 12th century
- Governing body: Sussex Archaeological Society

Listed Building – Grade II*
- Official name: Marlipins Museum
- Designated: 8 May 1950
- Reference no.: 1353757

Marlipins Museum, is a 12th to early-13th-century Grade II* listed building on the High Street in Shoreham-by-Sea, a town in Adur district in West Sussex, England. It is distinguished by the chequerboard pattern of limestone and flint on its front façade.

The building is thought to date from the 12th century, based on new evidence which has emerged following the demolition of the adjoining building during the construction of the new annexe. The northern wall was originally built between 1167 and 1197 and replaced by a new wall in the 15th century. It is thought to be the oldest complete non-religious building in Britain.

The Caen stone frontage is thought to have been added in the late-13th to early-14th century along with other renovations. Repairs and reconstruction then took place to the roof in the 15th century and new internal timbers were installed in the 16th century.

== Origins ==
There are various theories about the origins of the building and its intended purpose, which include its being a storehouse for wool and hides, a hospital, the remains of the Carmelite Priory, and even a meeting-house for the Knights Templar. There is no serious evidence for its ecclesiastical use.

The buildings may well have served as a Court of Piepowders (dusty feet) for those frequenting the markets held outside its doors, whilst it might have originally been built by the de Braoses as their depot in the town (they dwelt at nearby Bramber Castle).

== History ==
The deeds for Marlipins survive back to 1347. These describe it as an 'Oat Market on the corner of Moderlove Street' (today Middle Street). Later, when it belonged to the Prior of Lewis, it became known as 'his cellar'.

1346: The deeds show the Marlipins building (now a museum) sold by Stephen Must. It is described as a stone corner tenement called 'Malduppine' situated in the Otmarcat.

1488: A grant dated 8 September, 4 Henry VII (1488) by "John Sharpe the elder, of New Shorham, husbandman, to Thomas Dymmocke of Suthampton, merchant, of a cellar with a chamber or loft above it, called 'Malappynnys,' in New Shorham, between the street called 'Moderlove strete,' and a garden of the lord of the said town, and another street called 'Procession strete".

1703: Current spelling of Marlipins seems to have been first recorded.

1922: The Marlipins is purchased by the Sussex Archaeological Trust; this Trust was created by the Sussex Archaeological Society to manage its properties (plaques with this name can still be seen at Lewes Castle, Anne of Cleves House Museum and the Priest House. The building was in a bad state of repair and the renovation was made primarily with local contributions. It was opened as a museum in 1928, and is one of several properties administered by the Sussex Archaeological Society.

== Today ==
Today the building is a public museum, holding permanent displays which concentrate on Shoreham's important maritime past and the local history of this part of Sussex. The Archaeology Gallery looks at the Shoreham area from early prehistory to medieval times. Pictures from the extensive art collection are changed regularly and displayed at the two recently built galleries.

The building was Grade II* listed by English Heritage on 8 May 1950. Such buildings are defined as being "particularly important ... [and] of more than special interest". As of 2001, it was one of six Grade II* listed buildings, and 119 listed buildings of all grades, in Adur district.

== See also ==
- Grade II* listed buildings in West Sussex
