= St Mary de Haura Church, Shoreham-by-Sea =

St Mary de Haura Church
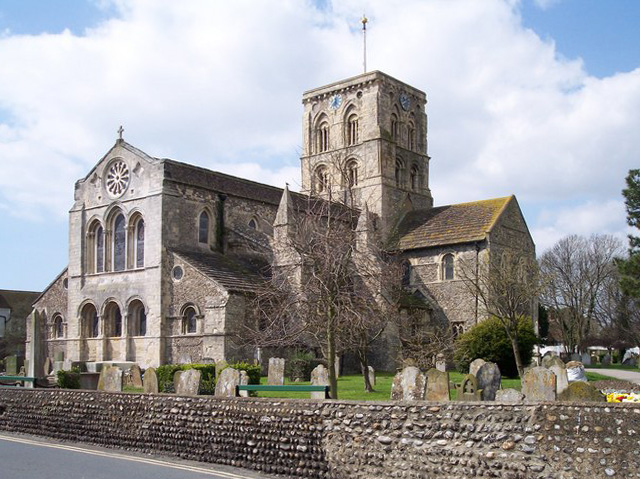
- The church from the northeast
- St Mary de Haura Church
- 50.8329°N 0.2742°W
- Location: Church Street, New Shoreham, Shoreham-by-Sea, West Sussex BN43 5DQ
- Country: England
- Denomination: Church of England
- Website: www.stmarydehaura.org.uk

History
- Status: Parish church
- Founded: c. 1096
- Founder: William de Braose, 1st Lord of Bramber
- Dedication: St Mary de Haura (St Mary at the Harbour)
- Dedicated: c. 1096

Architecture
- Functional status: Active
- Heritage designation: Grade I
- Designated: 8 May 1950
- Style: Norman

Administration
- Province: Canterbury
- Diocese: Chichester
- Archdeaconry: Chichester
- Deanery: Rural Deanery of Hove
- Parish: New Shoreham: St Mary de Haura

Clergy
- Vicar: Rev. Andrew Bennison

St Mary de Haura Church is an Anglican church in the ancient "New Shoreham" area of Shoreham-by-Sea in the district of Adur, one of seven local government districts in the English county of West Sussex. It was founded at the end of the 11th century as a large cruciform church which, due to its original scale, has been described as a collegiate church—a reflection of the port of Shoreham's importance at the time. The former east end of that building survives to form the present church, and much 12th-century work remains. It functions as Shoreham-by-Sea's "town church" for major religious and social events, as well as serving as the town-centre parish. English Heritage has listed it at Grade I for its architectural and historical importance.

== History ==
Old Shoreham was a mostly agricultural village on the east bank of the River Adur. Claims that it was founded near the place (Cymenshore) where Ælle of Sussex—the first King of the South Saxons—came ashore in 477 have been disproved, but it had become a successful village by the time of the Domesday survey in 1086, supporting a population of 76. In the decade after this, William de Braose, 1st Lord of Bramber or his son Philip founded a new settlement to the south, on the estuary where the Adur flowed into the English Channel. This may have been a result of William de Braose's failure to gain control of the harbour upstream at Steyning.

The settlement, named New Shoreham, was planned on a grid pattern of streets based around the High Street. Its harbour quickly became prosperous and successful: it overcame the competition from contemporary inland Sussex ports such as Arundel and Steyning, and gained royal patronage when King John's fleet was stationed there in the early 13th century. Its importance was further enhanced by its position as the closest English Channel port to London.

William the Conqueror had granted the Rape of Bramber, one of the six Rapes (subdivisions) of Sussex, to the de Braose family in the 11th century. Shortly afterwards, they founded a new church to serve the new settlement. William de Braose died no later than 1096, which has been suggested as the date of founding, but the first documentary evidence was a deed dated 1103, referring to Philip de Braose's return from the First Crusade. At this time, he granted the advowson of the church to an abbey in the French town of Saumur, which held it until about 1250. This abbey had an associated priory at Sele (present-day Upper Beeding), further up the river Adur, which became the church's patron in 1250. The patronage later transferred to Magdalen College, Oxford, and in 1948 to the Bishop of Chichester. Locally, the church had originally been administered from St Nicolas' Church in Old Shoreham, but it was given its own parish in the late 12th century. The two churches have been part of a united benefice, served by the same vicar, since 1897, however.

The present building—a large edifice itself, bigger than the small-scale buildings of the town— is merely the surviving east section of a much more substantial church, which would have been cruciform when built by the de Braoses. Although it was never more than a parish church, it may have been planned as a priory or collegiate church, or would have become one if the Port of Shoreham and the de Braose family had retained the power and influence they had in the 12th and 13th centuries. By 1500, however, no male heirs were left and the de Braoses' estates and holdings were broken up; and erosion and changing tidal activity made the port dangerous to sail into and had washed away parts of the grid-pattern town. New Shoreham was therefore left with a church of a much larger scale than it could support—it was described by Edward Augustus Freeman as "a parish church absolutely without a fellow in England".

As originally built, the church had a tower and a nave, beyond which was a chancel with an apse and east-facing rounded chapels at the east end; the outline of these can still be discerned. Later in the 12th century (probably from the 1170s onwards) everything beyond the nave was replaced with a tall, expansive quire with five bays, a quadripartite (four-celled) rib vault, aisles with their own vaulting, a triforium and a clerestory. This work took several decades and was undertaken for William de Braose, 3rd Lord of Bramber, Philip de Braose's son. Flying buttresses were added to the exterior to support the vaulted aisles soon after they were built—an early usage of this structural technique.

The church had reached its greatest physical extent by about 1225, when this work was completed. Its influence was also at its highest, as it had gained administrative independence from St Nicolas' Church, the de Braoses still wielded considerable power and the Port of Shoreham was thriving: King John stationed ships there and established a prison in 1221. New Shoreham even challenged Chichester's long-established position as the county town. A vicarage was founded in 1261; it was disestablished in 1897 when the vicarages of Old and New Shoreham were combined in a united benefice.

Over the following centuries, Shoreham's influence declined as its old trade routes (especially to France) were lost and the port was affected by erosion. Minor structural alterations took place, such as the construction of a porch, a rood screen and an accompanying altar, but the fabric of the church gradually disintegrated. It worsened during the 17th century, and the original (1130s) nave collapsed in storms in about 1700, reducing the length of the church by about half. The rubble was cleared in the early 18th century, although part of one of the bays survived and has been incorporated into a porch. The quire was altered to form a new nave and chancel.

During the 19th century, some work was undertaken in the interior, including Arthur Loader's replacement of some original Perpendicular Gothic-style aisle windows with Norman-style equivalents in 1876. The north transept was converted into a memorial for the war dead after the Second World War.

== Architecture ==
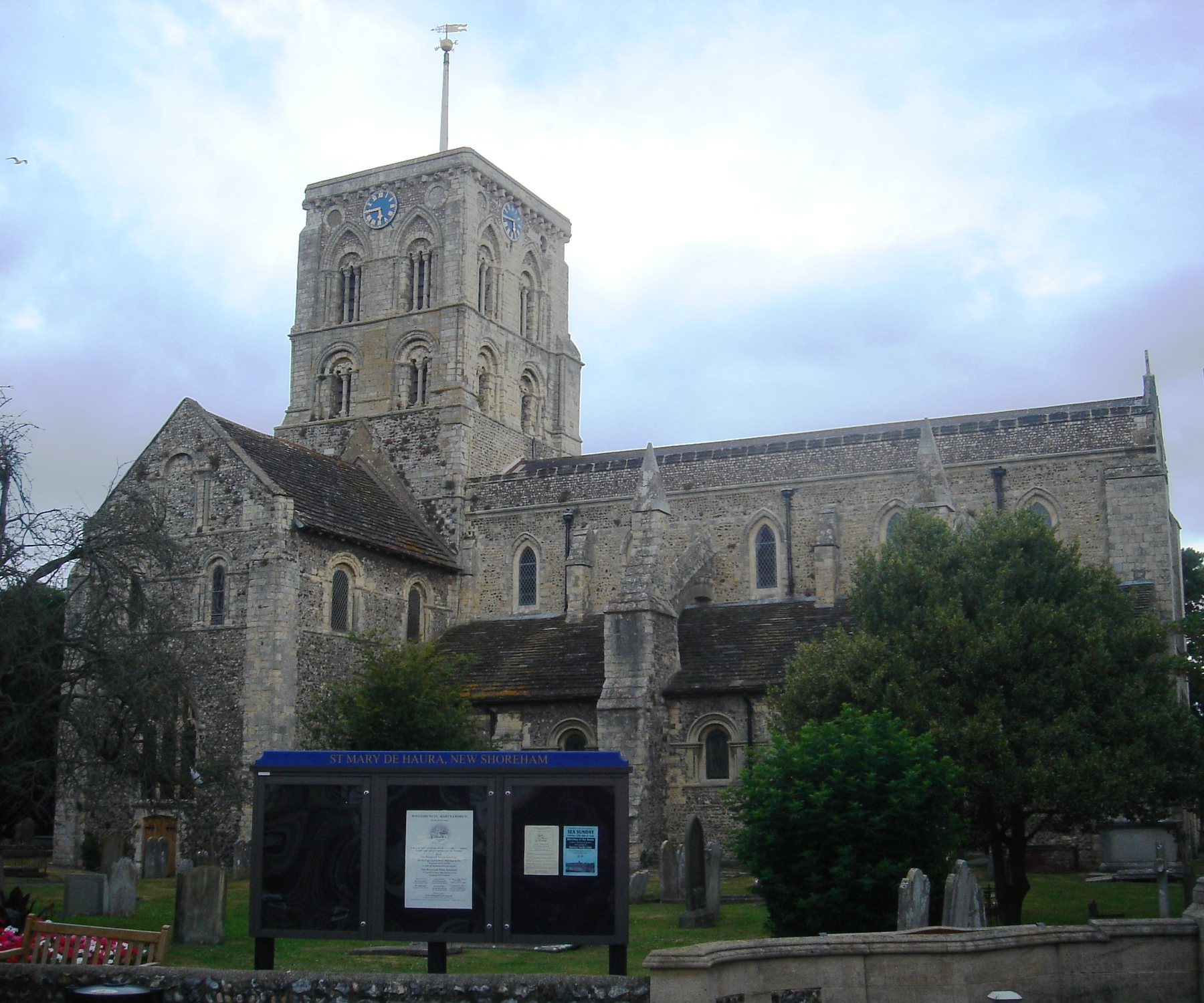
This view from the southeast shows the south transept, flying buttresses and two-stage tower with its two- and three-light openings.

The church is a pale stone and cobbled flint structure with some ashlar work. Tiles manufactured in Horsham of local stone cover the roof. A less durable stone was used for interior structures; some of these (for example a door at the west end) were exposed by the collapse of the original nave, and have experienced severe weathering.

The earliest surviving parts of St Mary de Haura Church are the transepts and their associated chapels, part of the tower and some of the tower arches with their large scalloped and leaved capitals; these are believed to date from 1130 at the latest, and possibly from much earlier in the 12th century. Part of one of the six bays of the original nave also remains, although it was restored in the 18th century.

The tower, flanked by transepts, perches on top of the roof at the west end and was built in two stages, both in the 12th century. The lower stage, dating from about 1130, has paired two-light openings in rounded arches on each side; the upper stage has larger three-light openings in pointed arches, and was built in the 1170s. There is also a clock on each side, at the top of the upper stage. Nikolaus Pevsner called it a "noble composite" and drew comparisons with church towers in northern France. Inside, the east, north and south tower arches date from about 1130 and have scalloped capitals; the west arch may be later and is taller, and has roll-moulding and other intricate decoration.

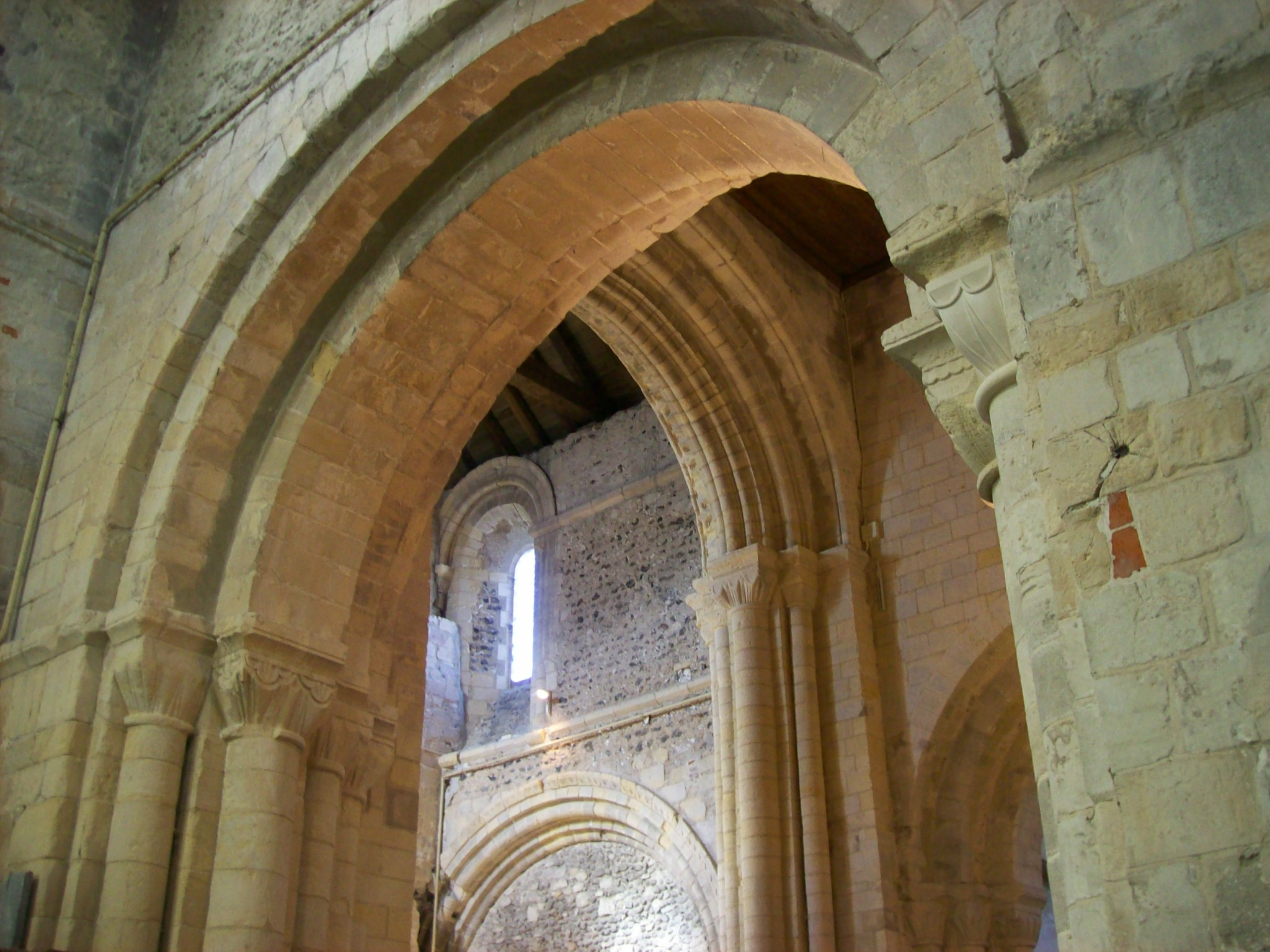
Interior: the tower arches at the west end

The former quire, with its five bays and low-vaulted aisles, has become the nave and chancel. The tall, four-celled vaulting extends across this space and gives the church a spacious feel. The architectural details of this area are varied, incorporating elements of late Norman and early Gothic design. For example, the alternating octagonal and round columns in the north aisle are a typical Norman feature, whereas those in the south aisle are more in the early Gothic style. The north aisle's columns have been compared to those of the contemporary Canterbury Cathedral, although their capitals are different; and it has been described as "[along] with Canterbury, the most continental of English churches".

== The church today ==
St Mary de Haura Church was listed at Grade I by English Heritage on 8 May 1950. Such buildings are defined as being of "exceptional interest" and of the greatest national importance. As of February 2001, it was one of seven Grade I listed buildings, and 119 listed buildings of all grades, in Adur district.

The parish, which was established in the late 12th century when the church became independent from St Nicolas' Church, is small—the extent of its land area is 116 acres (47 ha). It covers the ancient grid-pattern town centre and High Street area, as well as a small section of land on the west side of the River Adur.

The main service of the week is the Sunday morning Eucharistic service at 10.00am. A Sunday evening service is also held every week; these include traditional Evensong and ecumenical services with Shoreham-by-Sea's other churches. Although St Nicolas' Church, inland at Old Shoreham, is older, St Mary de Haura's size and central location makes it the de facto "town church" of Shoreham-by-Sea, and it is the venue for regular events such as Remembrance Sunday and the services of Holy Week and Christmas.

== See also ==
- List of places of worship in Adur
