= St Nicolas Church, Shoreham-by-Sea =

St Nicolas Church
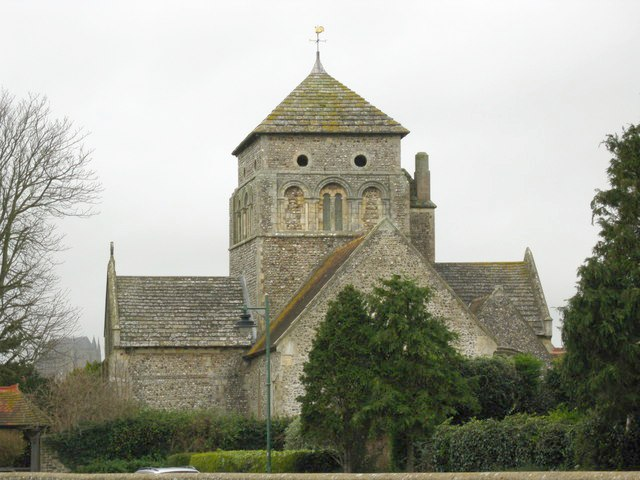
- The church from the southeast, with Lancing College Chapel in the background
- St Nicolas Church
- 50.8408°N 0.2856°W
- Location: St Nicolas Lane, Old Shoreham, Shoreham-by-Sea, West Sussex BN43 5NH
- Country: England
- Denomination: Church of England

History
- Status: Parish church
- Founded: c. 900
- Dedication: Nicolas of Myra
- Dedicated: c. 1080

Architecture
- Functional status: Active
- Heritage designation: Grade I
- Designated: 8 May 1950
- Style: Norman

Administration
- Province: Canterbury
- Diocese: Chichester
- Archdeaconry: Chichester
- Deanery: Rural Deanery of Hove
- Parish: Old Shoreham: St Nicolas

Clergy
- Vicar: Rev. James Grant

St Nicolas Church is an Anglican church in Old Shoreham, an ancient inland settlement that is now part of the town of Shoreham-by-Sea in the district of Adur, one of seven local government districts in the English county of West Sussex. It was founded on a riverside site by Anglo-Saxons at the start of the 10th century, possibly on the site of a 5th-century predecessor. Some Saxon-era structural elements remain despite 12th-century additions made when Shoreham became prosperous, further extension in the 14th century and a Victorian restoration. The cruciform structure, with its solid central tower, features some unusual Norman-era carving. English Heritage has listed it at Grade I for its architectural and historical importance.

== History ==
According to the Anglo-Saxon Chronicle, Ælle, an Anglo-Saxon bretwalda (overlord), came ashore at a place called Cymenes ora on the English Channel coast in 477. He defeated the native inhabitants and became the first king of the South Saxons. The location of the landing place is not known for certain, and historic claims that it was near Shoreham are now considered unlikely, but a church may have been founded inland next to the River Adur in 481. Later in the Saxon era, a large church was definitely built on the site. It had a prominent tower and was more than 50 feet (15 m) long. Most sources date its construction to 900 or slightly earlier.

William de Braose, a Norman nobleman who participated in the Norman conquest of England, was awarded large areas of land in Sussex, including the Rape of Bramber, in 1073. This area included the Saxon church and its surrounding village, which at the time was mostly agricultural (although prosperous, as indicated by the size of the church). In about 1080, he granted the advowson to an abbey in the French town of Saumur which was linked to a locally important priory in Sele (near modern-day Upper Beeding), further up the River Adur. Sele Priory became the church's patron in its own right in the early 13th century; it then passed into the control of Magdalen College, Oxford before being transferred to the Bishop of Chichester in 1948.

The church was significantly altered in about 1140, but parts of the Saxon structure were retained: the west and north walls of the nave are distinguished from the Norman-era work by their thickness, and there is a blocked doorway. Otherwise, the nave was rebuilt, the old tower was removed and a new central tower replaced it, north and south transepts were added (each incorporating a chapel), and a chancel and apse were built at the east end. The main entrance moved to the south transept, where an ornate doorway was provided. The tower was provided with a substantial crossing and arches with carvings of bizarre faces: these include King Stephen (the monarch at the time) and his wife Matilda, a cat, an elf and another human figure, conjectured to be the stonemason responsible for the carvings. All of these characters have "sad or angry expressions"; other faces elsewhere are said to have an "elongated, very French look".

The chancel was altered again in the 14th century: it was given a tie-beamed roof, and was extended to form two bays and its apsidal east end was replaced with a straight wall with a new window. The chapel in the north transept was also extended at this time, and a trefoil-headed rood screen was installed. This survives, although not in its original condition.

The next significant work was carried out between 1839 and 1840 by John Mason Neale who opened out the interior, rebuilt the transepts (the north transept and its chapel, in particular, were ruinous at that time) and added a new arch, built vestries and replaced most of the windows. At the same time J.C. Buckler restored the chancel. The changes gave the church a more Norman appearance than it originally had, according to Ian Nairn. Benjamin Ingelow made further changes in 1895–96.

== Architecture ==
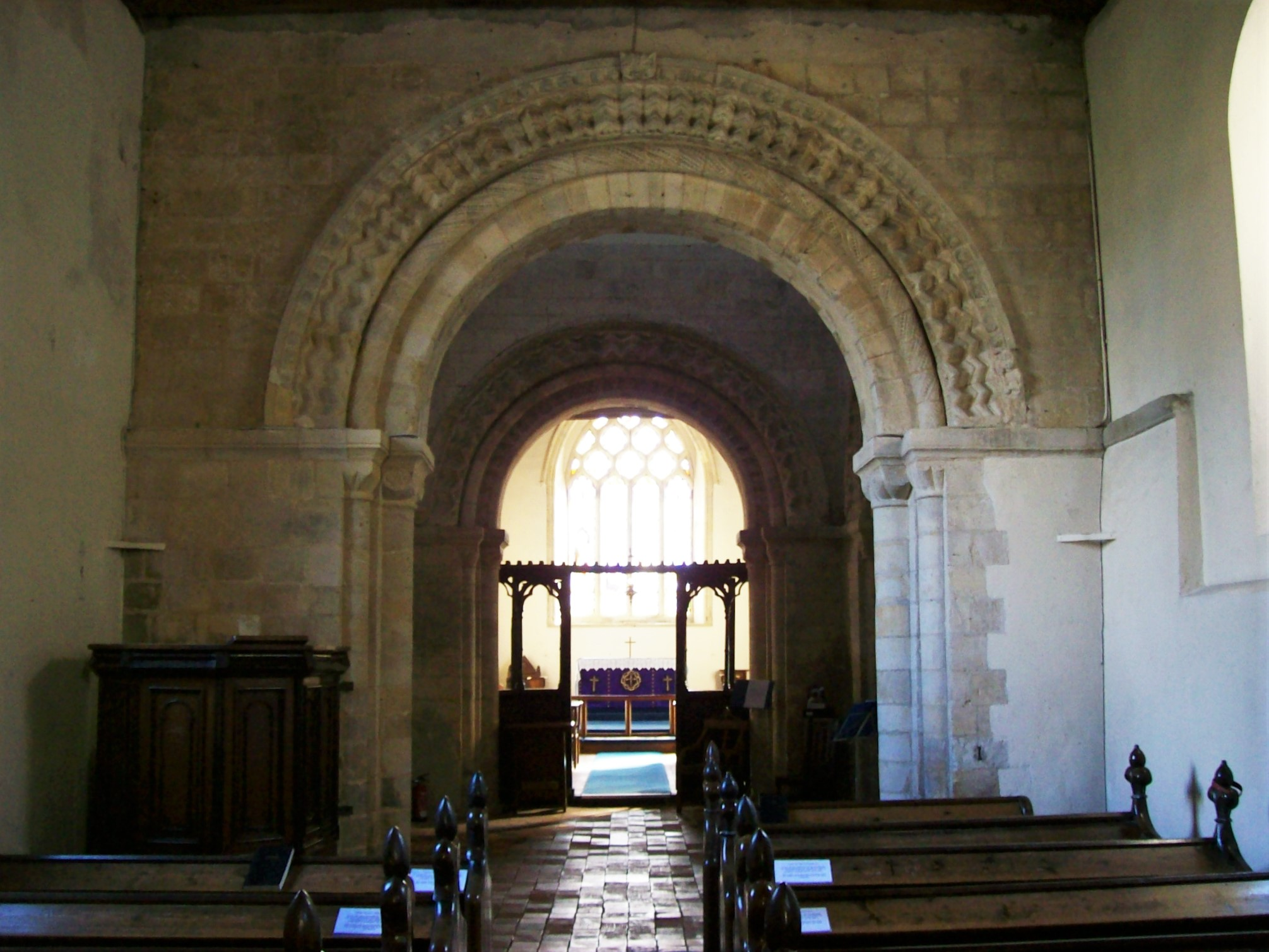
From the nave, looking beyond the crossing towards the altar

St Nicolas Church is a large cruciform building with a central tower. This is a common plan in Sussex: central towers are often seen, and the cruciform layout (nave to the west, chancel to the east and transepts to the north and south) is commoner than the linear alternative without transepts. The main building material is flint rubble-work; some walls have stone dressings. These are the most common structural materials used for ancient churches in Sussex. The roof is tiled with slabs of Horsham stone— another common feature in the area.

The nave is of three bays, and incorporates flintwork from the original 10th-century church, a blocked Saxon doorway on the north side and another on the south side dating from the 12th-century reconstruction. The two-bay chancel is in the Early English style; its east window has an example of reticulated (grid-pattern) tracery. The Norman tower has three arches on each face—the central one open and slightly larger, flanked by two closed arches—below paired oeils-de-boeuf. Inside, the large crossing and tower arches dominate. Each arch features well-preserved Norman carving, as do the arches of the transepts: as well as the royal figures, the cat and the elf, there are other human faces, shells, rosettes and chevron patterns.

== The church today ==
St Nicolas Church was listed at Grade I by English Heritage on 8 May 1950. Such buildings are defined as being of "exceptional interest" and greater than national importance. As of February 2001, it was one of seven Grade I listed buildings, and 119 listed buildings of all grades, in Adur district.

The parish of St Nicolas, which covers nearly 2,000 acres (800 ha), is smaller now than when it was established. St Mary de Haura Church, founded in the 11th century when the new Port of Shoreham was established on the English Channel coast, was part of the parish until about 1250, when it gained independence and its own parish. In the 20th century, land was taken from the east of the parish to form a new parish for St Giles' Church, newly built in neighbouring Kingston by Sea. The western boundary of the present-day parish is formed by the River Adur, and the northern boundary cuts across the lower slopes of the South Downs; Parkside, Eastern Avenue, Ham Road and Mill Lane form the urban boundaries.

== See also ==
- List of places of worship in Adur
