= Grade I listed buildings in West Sussex =

The county of West Sussex in South East England has 176 Grade I listed buildings. Such buildings are described by English Heritage, the authority responsible for their designation, as "of exceptional interest [and] sometimes considered to be internationally important". Grade I is the highest of the three grades of listed status in England: about 2.5% (or 9,300) of the country's 374,000 listed buildings have this designation.

== West Sussex and its buildings ==
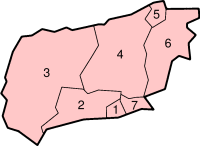
Districts of West Sussex

West Sussex, a non-metropolitan county, is divided for administrative purposes into seven local government districts, as marked on the map:

1. Worthing
2. Arun
3. Chichester
4. Horsham
5. Crawley
6. Mid Sussex
7. Adur

== Listed buildings in England ==
In England, a building or structure is defined as "listed" when it is placed on a statutory register of buildings of "special architectural or historic interest" by the Secretary of State for Culture, Media and Sport, a Government department, in accordance with the Planning (Listed Buildings and Conservation Areas) Act 1990 (a successor to the 1947 act). English Heritage, a non-departmental public body, acts as an agency of this department to administer the process and advise the department on relevant issues. There are three grades of listing status. Grade I, the highest, is defined as being of "exceptional interest"; Grade II* is used for "particularly important buildings of more than special interest"; and Grade II, the lowest, is used for buildings of "special interest". As of July 2009, about 374,000 buildings in England were listed. Around 92% of these had the lowest designation, Grade II; 5.5% were listed at Grade II*; and about 2.5% had the highest grade.

Listed status gives buildings a degree of protection from unapproved alteration, demolition or other changes. Local authorities must consult English Heritage when an application for alteration of a Grade I-listed building is made.

=== Adur ===
Name	Location	Type	Completed (Note: The date given is the date used by Historic England as significant for the initial building or that of an important part in the structure's description.)	Date designated	Grid ref. (Note: The grid reference is based on the British national grid reference system, sometimes known as OSGB36, used by the Ordnance Survey.) Geo-coordinates	Entry number (Note: The "List Entry Number" is a unique number assigned to each listed building and scheduled monument by Historic England.)	Image	Ref.
Coombes Church	Coombes	Church	11th century	12 October 1954	TQ1905908156; 50°51′38″N 0°18′35″W	1353728	Coombes Church More images	
Lancing College (Chapel)	Lancing	Chapel	1882	12 October 1954	TQ1960806609; 50°50′48″N 0°18′09″W	1286548	Lancing College (Chapel) More images	
St James the Less Church	Lancing	Parish church	13th century	12 October 1954	TQ1820605598; 50°50′16″N 0°19′21″W	1192533	St James the Less Church More images	
Church of St Mary the Blessed Virgin	Sompting	Parish church	12th century	12 October 1954	TQ1614505635; 50°50′19″N 0°21′07″W	1353763	Church of St Mary the Blessed Virgin More images	
St Julian's Church	Kingston Buci	Parish church	11th century	8 May 1950	TQ2357205216; 50°50′00″N 0°14′48″W	1027871	St Julian's Church More images	
St Mary de Haura Church	Shoreham-by-Sea	Parish church	12th century	8 May 1950	TQ2162305126; 50°49′58″N 0°16′27″W	1192780	St Mary de Haura Church More images	
St Nicolas' Church	Shoreham-by-Sea	Parish church	12th century	8 May 1950	TQ2080305986; 50°50′27″N 0°17′08″W	1027872	St Nicolas' Church More images	

=== Arun ===
Name	Location	Type	Completed	Date designated	Grid ref. Geo-coordinates	Entry number	Image	Ref.
St Mary the Virgin's Church	Aldingbourne	Parish church	Medieval	5 June 1958	SU9233905479; 50°50′29″N 0°41′24″W	1027736	St Mary the Virgin's Church More images	
Arundel Castle	Arundel	Castle	Pre-1732	26 March 1949	TQ0191807254; 50°51′21″N 0°33′12″W	1027926	Arundel Castle More images	
St Nicholas' Church	Arundel	Parish church	1380	26 March 1949	TQ0163907253; 50°51′21″N 0°33′27″W	1027914	St Nicholas' Church More images	
Fitzalan Chapel	Arundel	Collegiate Church	1380	26 March 1949	TQ0167207259; 50°51′21″N 0°33′25″W	1263812	Fitzalan Chapel More images	
Cathedral of Our Lady and St Philip Howard and Piers surrounding Churchyard	Arundel	Roman Catholic Cathedral	1869	26 March 1949	TQ0152607178; 50°51′19″N 0°33′32″W	1248090	Cathedral of Our Lady and St Philip Howard and Piers surrounding Churchyard More images	
Barnham Court	Barnham	House	Mid 17th century	5 June 1958	SU9557703572; 50°49′26″N 0°38′40″W	1233144	Barnham Court More images	
St Mary the Virgin's Church	Barnham	Parish church	Norman	5 June 1958	SU9564203558; 50°49′25″N 0°38′37″W	1027690	St Mary the Virgin's Church More images	
The Dome	Bognor Regis	Terrace	1787	22 July 1949	SZ9412199668; 50°47′20″N 0°39′58″W	1353844	The Dome More images	
St Mary's Church	Burpham	Parish church	Norman	12 October 1954	TQ0392608981; 50°52′16″N 0°31′28″W	1027657	St Mary's Church More images	
St Mary's Church	Clapham	Parish church	Transitional Norman	12 October 1954	TQ0959606639; 50°50′56″N 0°26′40″W	1276634	St Mary's Church More images	
St Mary's Church	Climping	Parish church	Late 12th century	5 June 1958	TQ0029302551; 50°48′50″N 0°34′40″W	1027640	St Mary's Church More images	
St Mary's Church	East Preston	Parish church	Medieval	12 October 1954	TQ0649602530; 50°48′45″N 0°29′23″W	1027649	St Mary's Church More images	
St Andrew's Church	Ferring	Parish church	13th century	12 October 1954	TQ0943402584; 50°48′45″N 0°26′53″W	1276447	St Andrew's Church More images	
St John the Baptist's Church	Findon	Parish church	Transitional Norman	12 October 1954	TQ1164408474; 50°51′54″N 0°24′54″W	1027619	St John the Baptist's Church More images	
St Andrew's Church	Ford	Parish church	Norman	5 June 1958	TQ0025603709; 50°49′27″N 0°34′41″W	1233989	St Andrew's Church More images	
St Mary Magdalen's Church	Lyminster	Parish church	Saxon	12 October 1954	TQ0227804775; 50°50′01″N 0°32′56″W	1027604	St Mary Magdalen's Church More images	
St Thomas a Becket's Church	Pagham	Parish church	C11-12	5 June 1958	SZ8836997474; 50°46′12″N 0°44′54″W	1353902	St Thomas a Becket's Church More images	
St John the Divine's Church	Patching	Parish church	13th century	12 October 1954	TQ0871806589; 50°50′55″N 0°27′25″W	1275573	St John the Divine's Church More images	
St John's Priory	Poling	House	1546	12 October 1954	TQ0466405690; 50°50′29″N 0°30′53″W	1217172	St John's Priory More images	
St Nicholas' Church	Poling	Parish church	Saxon	12 October 1954	TQ0470204602; 50°49′53″N 0°30′53″W	1275560	St Nicholas' Church More images	
St Mary's Church	Slindon	Parish church	13th century	5 June 1958	SU9610608346; 50°52′00″N 0°38′08″W	1027563	St Mary's Church More images	
St Leonard's Church	South Stoke	Parish church	11th century	12 October 1954	TQ0266010040; 50°52′51″N 0°32′32″W	1221989	St Leonard's Church More images	
St Mary's Church	Walberton	Parish church	12th century	5 June 1958	SU9714605734; 50°50′35″N 0°37′18″W	1274629	St Mary's Church More images	
St Mary's Church	Yapton	Parish church	12th century	5 June 1958	SU9817003535; 50°49′23″N 0°36′27″W	1237782	St Mary's Church More images	

=== Chichester ===
Name	Location	Type	Completed	Date designated	Grid ref. Geo-coordinates	Entry number	Image	Ref.
Rymans	Apuldram	House	about 1410	5 June 1958	SU8418303224; 50°49′21″N 0°48′22″W	1354451	Rymans More images	
St Mary's Church	Apuldram	Parish church	13th century	5 June 1958	SU8415903364; 50°49′25″N 0°48′24″W	1026474	St Mary's Church More images	
St Mary's Church	Barlavington	Parish church	Late 12th century	22 February 1955	SU9721816050; 50°56′09″N 0°37′04″W	1274820	St Mary's Church More images	
St Mary's Church	Bepton	Parish church	13th century	18 June 1959	SU8551718283; 50°57′28″N 0°47′02″W	1026059	St Mary's Church More images	
Holy Cross Church	Bignor	Parish church	Medieval	22 February 1955	SU9824714673; 50°55′23″N 0°36′13″W	1026553	Holy Cross Church More images	
St James' Church, Birdham	Birdham	Parish church	Medieval	5 June 1958	SU8237300314; 50°47′48″N 0°49′57″W	1287246	St James' Church, Birdham More images	
Holy Trinity Church	Bosham	Parish church	13th century	5 June 1958	SU8042903885; 50°49′44″N 0°51′34″W	1354443	Holy Trinity Church More images	
Ruins of the Monastic Buildings of Boxgrove Priory	Boxgrove	Priory	now ruinous	5 June 1958	SU9081307559; 50°51′38″N 0°42′40″W	1026436	Ruins of the Monastic Buildings of Boxgrove Priory More images	
Priory Church of St Mary and St Blaise	Boxgrove	Parish church	founded about 1117	5 June 1958	SU9082607506; 50°51′36″N 0°42′39″W	1230005	Priory Church of St Mary and St Blaise More images	
Ruins of Old Halnaker House	Halnaker	Country house	13th century	5 June 1958	SU9082708856; 50°52′19″N 0°42′38″W	1026405	Ruins of Old Halnaker House More images	
St John the Evangelist's Church	Bury	Parish church	12th century	22 February 1955	TQ0166113091; 50°54′30″N 0°33′20″W	1222367	St John the Evangelist's Church More images	
Chichester Cathedral Bell Tower	Chichester	Bell tower	Late C14/Early 15th century	5 July 1950	SU8591204830; 50°50′12″N 0°46′53″W	1026825	Chichester Cathedral Bell Tower More images	
Canon Gate	Chichester	Gate	16th century	5 July 1950	SU8603004664; 50°50′06″N 0°46′47″W	1026655	Canon Gate More images	
Greyfriars Chapel (Chichester Guildhall)	Chichester	Guildhall	1541	5 July 1950	SU8623905124; 50°50′21″N 0°46′36″W	1026695	Greyfriars Chapel (Chichester Guildhall) More images	
City Walls	Chichester	Boundary Wall	Roman	8 October 1971	SU8589105149; 50°50′22″N 0°46′54″W	1354262	City Walls More images	
St John the Evangelist's Church	Chichester	Redundant church	1813	5 July 1950	SU8638104706; 50°50′08″N 0°46′29″W	1026696	St John the Evangelist's Church More images	
Pallant House	Chichester	House	1712	5 July 1950	SU8616104665; 50°50′06″N 0°46′40″W	1354302	Pallant House More images	
St Mary's Hospital	Chichester	Almshouse	1680	5 July 1950	SU8624404937; 50°50′15″N 0°46′36″W	1026704	St Mary's Hospital More images	
Chichester Cathedral and Cloisters	Chichester	Cathedral	1091-1123	5 July 1950	SU8595604776; 50°50′10″N 0°46′51″W	1354261	Chichester Cathedral and Cloisters More images	
St Olave's Church	Chichester	Redundant church	11th century	8 October 1971	SU8610104891; 50°50′14″N 0°46′43″W	1026724	St Olave's Church More images	
John Edes House	Chichester	House	1696	5 July 1950	SU8579804880; 50°50′14″N 0°46′59″W	1026616	John Edes House More images	
Market Cross	Chichester	Market Cross	1500	5 July 1950	SU8606204819; 50°50′11″N 0°46′45″W	1026826	Market Cross More images	
Bishop's Palace	Chichester	Palace	13th century	5 July 1950	SU8586904772; 50°50′10″N 0°46′55″W	1286999	Bishop's Palace More images	
The Royal Chantry	Chichester	House	13th century	5 July 1950	SU8597004722; 50°50′08″N 0°46′50″W	1026810	The Royal Chantry More images	
Vicar's Hall and Crypt	Chichester	Clergy house	Late 14th century	5 July 1950	SU8602404735; 50°50′09″N 0°46′47″W	1026653	Vicar's Hall and Crypt More images	
St Catherine of Siena's Church	Cocking	Parish church	12th century	18 June 1959	SU8795517522; 50°57′02″N 0°44′57″W	1026062	St Catherine of Siena's Church More images	
St Michael's Church	Up Marden	Parish church	13th century	5 June 1958	SU7952514111; 50°55′16″N 0°52′12″W	1026390	St Michael's Church More images	
St George's Church	Donnington	Parish church	Early 13th century	5 June 1958	SU8523002214; 50°48′48″N 0°47′30″W	1231136	St George's Church More images	
St Richard's Church	Burton Park, Duncton	Parish church	Norman	22 February 1955	SU9676017569; 50°56′58″N 0°37′26″W	1238093	St Richard's Church More images	
Burton Park House	Burton Park, Duncton	House	c. 1828	22 February 1955	SU9681217494; 50°56′56″N 0°37′24″W	1274798	Burton Park House More images	
St Margaret's Church	Eartham	Parish church	Medieval	5 June 1958	SU9385909359; 50°52′34″N 0°40′02″W	1026364	St Margaret's Church More images	
Easebourne Priory	Easebourne	Priory	13th century	18 June 1959	SU8950922502; 50°59′42″N 0°43′33″W	1277106	Easebourne Priory More images	
St Mary's Church	Easebourne	Parish church	13th century	18 June 1959	SU8950422530; 50°59′43″N 0°43′34″W	1277103	St Mary's Church More images	
The Refectory	Easebourne	House	13th century	18 June 1959	SU8948922495; 50°59′42″N 0°43′34″W	1026017	The Refectory More images	
Ruins of Cowdray House	Easebourne	Country house	c. 1533	18 June 1959	SU8914021653; 50°59′15″N 0°43′53″W	1277176	Ruins of Cowdray House More images	
All Saints Church	East Dean	Parish church	12th century	5 June 1958	SU9052913196; 50°54′40″N 0°42′49″W	1026377	All Saints Church More images	
St Andrew's Church	Didling	Parish church	13th century	18 June 1959	SU8350718122; 50°57′23″N 0°48′45″W	1217762	St Andrew's Church More images	
St Agatha's Church	Coates	Parish church	Norman	22 February 1955	SU9974717807; 50°57′04″N 0°34′53″W	1026522	St Agatha's Church More images	
St Mary's Church	Fittleworth	Parish church	Late 11th century	22 February 1955	TQ0092819286; 50°57′51″N 0°33′51″W	1238939	St Mary's Church More images	
St Andrew's Church	West Stoke	Parish church	C11/C12	5 June 1958	SU8264608732; 50°52′20″N 0°49′37″W	1232313	St Andrew's Church More images	
St James's Church	Selham	Church	11th century	18 June 1959	SU9328020684; 50°58′41″N 0°40′22″W	1232817	St James's Church More images	
Uppark: Old Laundry and Kitchen Block	South Harting	Kitchen	c. 1770	18 June 1959	SU7802417635; 50°57′10″N 0°53′26″W	1232940	Uppark: Old Laundry and Kitchen Block More images	
St Mary and St Gabriel's Church	South Harting	Parish church	c. 1300	18 June 1959	SU7842019412; 50°58′08″N 0°53′04″W	1233417	St Mary and St Gabriel's Church More images	
Uppark_Stable Block	South Harting	Stables	c. 1770	18 June 1959	SU7793317632; 50°57′10″N 0°53′31″W	1276851	Uppark_Stable Block More images	
Uppark	South Harting	Country house	c. 1689	18 June 1959	SU7798117583; 50°57′09″N 0°53′28″W	1025979	Uppark More images	
St John the Baptist's Church	Kirdford	Parish church	Medieval	22 February 1955	TQ0182226494; 51°01′44″N 0°32′58″W	1239138	St John the Baptist's Church More images	
St Mary's Church	East Lavant	Parish church	Medieval	5 June 1958	SU8619608484; 50°52′10″N 0°46′35″W	1354517	St Mary's Church More images	
Goodwood Golf Clubhouse and Kennels Cottage	Goodwood Park, Westhampnett	House	1787	5 June 1958	SU8817509096; 50°52′29″N 0°44′53″W	1026301	Goodwood Golf Clubhouse and Kennels Cottage More images	
Shulbrede Priory	Linchmere	House	16th century	18 June 1959	SU8763929894; 51°03′42″N 0°45′03″W	1025945	Shulbrede Priory More images	
Aldworth House	Black Down, Lurgashall	House	1869	18 June 1959	SU9256830789; 51°04′08″N 0°40′49″W	1234518	Aldworth House More images	
St Mary's Church	North Marden	Parish church	12th century	5 June 1958	SU8071716137; 50°56′21″N 0°51′09″W	1026317	St Mary's Church More images	
St Peter's Church	East Marden	Parish church	12th century	5 June 1958	SU8074014634; 50°55′32″N 0°51′09″W	1232622	St Peter's Church More images	
St Giles' Church	Merston	Redundant church	13th century	28 January 1986	SU8936402622; 50°48′59″N 0°43′58″W	1276899	St Giles' Church More images	
Petworth House	Petworth	Country house	14th century	22 February 1955	SU9758621891; 50°59′17″N 0°36′40″W	1225989	Petworth House More images	
St Mary's Church	Petworth	Parish church	13th century	22 February 1955	SU9768221867; 50°59′17″N 0°36′35″W	1224199	St Mary's Church More images	
St Bartholomew's Church	Rogate	Parish church	13th century	18 June 1959	SU8076423798; 51°00′28″N 0°51′01″W	1275547	St Bartholomew's Church More images	
St Wilfrid's Chapel	Church Norton, Selsey	Redundant church	13th century	5 June 1958	SZ8720295762; 50°45′18″N 0°45′55″W	1026240	St Wilfrid's Chapel More images	
St Mary's Church	Sidlesham	Parish church	13th century	5 June 1958	SZ8557199022; 50°47′04″N 0°47′15″W	1233271	St Mary's Church More images	
Church of the Blessed Virgin Mary	Singleton	Parish church	11th century	5 June 1958	SU8780313032; 50°54′36″N 0°45′09″W	1354576	Church of the Blessed Virgin Mary More images	
Stopham Bridge	Stopham	Bridge	1423	15 March 1955	TQ0297318382; 50°57′20″N 0°32′07″W	1354033	Stopham Bridge More images	
St Mary's Church	Stopham	Parish church	early Norman	22 February 1955	TQ0265418936; 50°57′39″N 0°32′23″W	1226926	St Mary's Church More images	
St Paul's Church	Stansted Park	Parish church	Late 15th century	5 June 1958	SU7599510180; 50°53′10″N 0°55′16″W	1034392	St Paul's Church More images	
St Peter's Church	Racton	Parish church	12th century	5 June 1958	SU7798609218; 50°52′38″N 0°53′35″W	1026186	St Peter's Church More images	
St Mary's Church	Stoughton	Parish church	11th century	5 June 1958	SU8009411561; 50°53′53″N 0°51′45″W	1026154	St Mary's Church More images	
St John the Baptist's Church	Sutton	Parish church	11th century	22 February 1955	SU9788615555; 50°55′52″N 0°36′30″W	1265534	St John the Baptist's Church More images	
St Andrew's Church	Tangmere	Parish church	13th century	5 June 1958	SU9016306167; 50°50′53″N 0°43′14″W	1276210	St Andrew's Church More images	
All Hallows Church	Tillington	Parish church	13th century	18 June 1959	SU9630621998; 50°59′22″N 0°37′45″W	1217757	All Hallows Church More images	
St Mary's Church	Chithurst	Parish church	11th century	18 June 1959	SU8425123080; 51°00′03″N 0°48′02″W	1221269	St Mary's Church More images	
The Old Rectory	Trotton	House	18th century	18 June 1959	SU8355922334; 50°59′40″N 0°48′39″W	1221281	Upload Photo	
St George's Church	Trotton	Parish church	Early 14th century	18 June 1959	SU8362922508; 50°59′45″N 0°48′35″W	1221344	St George's Church More images	
Trotton Bridge	Trotton	Bridge	c. 1600	18 June 1959	SU8365422393; 50°59′42″N 0°48′34″W	1221337	Trotton Bridge More images	
St Mary the Virgin's Church	Upwaltham	Parish church	Medieval	5 June 1958	SU9430613858; 50°54′59″N 0°39′35″W	1026165	St Mary the Virgin's Church More images	
St Nicholas' Church	West Itchenor	Parish church	Medieval	5 June 1958	SU7997600644; 50°47′59″N 0°51′59″W	1026102	St Nicholas' Church More images	
St Nicholas' Church	West Thorney	Parish church	Medieval	5 June 1958	SU7699002463; 50°49′00″N 0°54′31″W	1026105	St Nicholas' Church More images	
St Peter and St Paul's Church	West Wittering	Parish church	12th century	5 June 1958	SZ7770098393; 50°46′48″N 0°53′57″W	1354665	St Peter and St Paul's Church More images	
St John the Baptist's Church	Westbourne	Parish church	Late 14th century	5 June 1958	SU7555807312; 50°51′37″N 0°55′40″W	1026167	St John the Baptist's Church More images	
Goodwood House	Goodwood Park, Westhampnett	Country house	Elizabethan	5 June 1958	SU8880808839; 50°52′20″N 0°44′21″W	1216953	Goodwood House More images	
Shell Grotto to the North West of Carne's Seat	Goodwood Park, Westhampnett	Grotto	Mid 18th century	5 June 1958	SU8882509591; 50°52′44″N 0°44′20″W	1026091	Upload Photo	
Stables at Goodwood House	Goodwood Park, Westhampnett	Stables	1763	5 June 1958	SU8869608802; 50°52′19″N 0°44′27″W	1026129	Stables at Goodwood House More images	
St Peter ad Vincula Church	Wisborough Green	Parish church	Late 11th century	22 February 1955	TQ0518425844; 51°01′20″N 0°30′06″W	1265361	St Peter ad Vincula Church More images	
All Hallows Church	Woolbeding	Parish church	11th century	18 June 1959	SU8730422666; 50°59′48″N 0°45′26″W	1221572	All Hallows Church More images	
Woolbeding House	Woolbeding	House	Elizabethan	18 June 1959	SU8732022713; 50°59′50″N 0°45′25″W	1221573	Woolbeding House More images	

=== Crawley ===
Name	Location	Type	Completed	Date designated	Grid ref. Geo-coordinates	Entry number	Image	Ref.
Ifield Friends Meeting House	Ifield	Friends Meeting House	1676	21 June 1948	TQ2524337911; 51°07′36″N 0°12′42″W	1298879	Ifield Friends Meeting House More images	
St Margaret's Church	Ifield	Parish church	13th century	23 February 1983	TQ2470337576; 51°07′26″N 0°13′10″W	1187108	St Margaret's Church More images	
St Nicholas' Church	Worth	Parish church	Saxon	28 October 1957	TQ3019436196; 51°06′37″N 0°08′30″W	1187114	St Nicholas' Church More images	

=== Horsham ===
Name	Location	Type	Completed	Date designated	Grid ref. Geo-coordinates	Entry number	Image	Ref.
Amberley Castle	Amberley	Castle	1377-1382	15 March 1955	TQ0274913173; 50°54′32″N 0°32′24″W	1027499	Amberley Castle More images	
St Michael and All Angels Church	Amberley	Parish church	Norman	15 March 1955	TQ0278713192; 50°54′33″N 0°32′22″W	1353924	St Michael and All Angels Church More images	
St James's Church	Ashurst	Parish church	Mostly 13th century	15 March 1955	TQ1763716370; 50°56′05″N 0°19′38″W	1027453	St James's Church More images	
St Mary's Church	Billingshurst	Parish church	Medieval	22 September 1959	TQ0875725919; 51°01′21″N 0°27′03″W	1354139	St Mary's Church More images	
St Botolph's Church	Botolphs	Parish church	Saxon	15 March 1955	TQ1935709253; 50°52′14″N 0°18′18″W	1191927	St Botolph's Church More images	
Ruins of Bramber Castle	Bramber	Motte and Bailey	Norman	15 March 1955	TQ1857810652; 50°53′00″N 0°18′57″W	1286805	Ruins of Bramber Castle More images	
St Mary's House	Bramber	House	19th century	15 March 1955	TQ1892510604; 50°52′58″N 0°18′39″W	1027419	St Mary's House More images	
St Nicholas' Church	Bramber	Parish church	Largely Norman	15 March 1955	TQ1860810622; 50°52′59″N 0°18′55″W	1353947	St Nicholas' Church More images	
All Saints Church	Buncton	Parish church	Norman	15 March 1955	TQ1450513910; 50°54′48″N 0°22′21″W	1354113	All Saints Church More images	
St Peter's Church	Cowfold	Parish church	Medieval	22 September 1959	TQ2125122605; 50°59′24″N 0°16′26″W	1354161	St Peter's Church More images	
Greatham Church	Greatham	Parish church	13th century	15 March 1955	TQ0439415994; 50°56′02″N 0°30′57″W	1027395	Greatham Church More images	
Hardham Priory	Hardham	Farmhouse		15 March 1955	TQ0342617096; 50°56′39″N 0°31′45″W	1027430	Hardham Priory More images	
Hardham Priory: Ruins of the Chapter House	Hardham	Chapter House	Mid 13th century	15 March 1955	TQ0343617108; 50°56′39″N 0°31′45″W	1192119	Upload Photo	
St Botolph's Church, Hardham	Hardham	Parish church	12th century	15 March 1955	TQ0387017612; 50°56′55″N 0°31′22″W	1353968	St Botolph's Church, Hardham More images	
St Mary's Church	Horsham	Parish church	13th century	20 May 1949	TQ1706530259; 51°03′35″N 0°19′51″W	1353908	St Mary's Church More images	
St Mary the Virgin's Church	North Stoke	Redundant church	11th century	15 March 1955	TQ0199310770; 50°53′15″N 0°33′05″W	1286953	St Mary the Virgin's Church More images	
Parham Park	Parham	House	1577 onwards	15 March 1955	TQ0600914219; 50°55′04″N 0°29′36″W	1027355	Parham Park More images	
St Peter's Church	Parham	Parish church	15th century	15 March 1955	TQ0595814081; 50°54′59″N 0°29′39″W	1027354	St Peter's Church More images	
The Stables and Laundry Wing at Parham Park	Parham	Stables		15 March 1955	TQ0602114272; 50°55′05″N 0°29′35″W	1027356	The Stables and Laundry Wing at Parham Park More images	
St Mary's Church	Pulborough	Parish church	C13-C14	15 March 1955	TQ0470118765; 50°57′32″N 0°30′38″W	1286174	St Mary's Church More images	
Holy Trinity Church	Rudgwick	Parish church	Medieval	22 September 1959	TQ0909034303; 51°05′52″N 0°26′36″W	1354190	Holy Trinity Church More images	
St Mary Magdalene's Church	Rusper	Parish church	Medieval	22 September 1959	TQ2051937348; 51°07′22″N 0°16′45″W	1026946	St Mary Magdalene's Church More images	
The Gateway and Porters Lodge to the North West of Ewhurst Manor	Shermanbury	Porters Lodge	Early 14th century	15 March 1955	TQ2114719016; 50°57′28″N 0°16′35″W	1194178	The Gateway and Porters Lodge to the North West of Ewhurst Manor More images	
Newbuildings Place	Shipley	House	1683	22 September 1959	TQ1407224467; 51°00′30″N 0°22′32″W	1180744	Newbuildings Place More images	
St Mary's Church	Shipley	Parish church	12th century	22 September 1959	TQ1449321810; 50°59′04″N 0°22′13″W	1180756	St Mary's Church More images	
St Andrew's Church	Steyning	Parish church	Ruins by 1578	15 March 1955	TQ1790611402; 50°53′24″N 0°19′30″W	1285518	St Andrew's Church More images	
Steyning Grammar School	Steyning	School	1614	15 March 1955	TQ1773711192; 50°53′18″N 0°19′39″W	1194367	Steyning Grammar School More images	
St Mary's Church	Sullington	Parish church	Saxon	15 March 1955	TQ0983613111; 50°54′25″N 0°26′21″W	1354077	St Mary's Church More images	
Little Thakeham	Thakeham	Manor house	1903	15 March 1955	TQ1090315728; 50°55′49″N 0°25′24″W	1027209	Little Thakeham More images	
St Mary's Church	Thakeham	Parish church	12th century	15 March 1955	TQ1099617317; 50°56′41″N 0°25′17″W	1354080	St Mary's Church More images	
Church of the Holy Sepulchre, Warminghurst	Warminghurst	Redundant church	13th century	15 March 1955	TQ1171116855; 50°56′25″N 0°24′41″W	1027448	Church of the Holy Sepulchre, Warminghurst More images	
Field Place	Warnham	Country house	Medieval	22 September 1959	TQ1472632098; 51°04′36″N 0°21′49″W	1026916	Field Place More images	
St Margaret's Church	Warnham	Parish church	14th century	22 September 1959	TQ1589433677; 51°05′27″N 0°20′47″W	1026877	St Margaret's Church More images	
St Mary's Church, West Chiltington	West Chiltington	Parish church	Late 11th century	15 March 1955	TQ0901818345; 50°57′15″N 0°26′57″W	1354121	St Mary's Church, West Chiltington More images	
St George's Church	West Grinstead	Parish church	12th century	22 September 1959	TQ1708720682; 50°58′25″N 0°20′01″W	1284797	St George's Church More images	
Wiggonholt Church	Wiggonholt	Parish church	13th century	15 March 1955	TQ0601416770; 50°56′26″N 0°29′33″W	1027364	Wiggonholt Church More images	
Wiston House	Wiston	Country house	c. 1576	9 May 1980	TQ1549912416; 50°53′59″N 0°21′32″W	1027156	Wiston House More images	

=== Mid Sussex ===
Name	Location	Type	Completed	Date designated	Grid ref. Geo-coordinates	Entry number	Image	Ref.
St Peter's Church	Ardingly	Parish church	14th century	28 October 1957	TQ3397229826; 51°03′08″N 0°05′24″W	1286656	St Peter's Church More images	
Wakehurst Place	Ardingly	House	south side demol. before 1697	28 October 1957	TQ3395031418; 51°03′59″N 0°05′23″W	1025764	Wakehurst Place More images	
Stone Hall	Balcombe	Dower House	Late 17th century	28 October 1957	TQ3221428829; 51°02′37″N 0°06′55″W	1286412	Stone Hall More images	
St Mary's Church	Balcombe	Parish church	late 13th century or early 14th century	28 October 1957	TQ3070030909; 51°03′46″N 0°08′10″W	1354797	St Mary's Church More images	
St Mary Magdalene's Church	Bolney	Parish church	1100 circa	28 October 1957	TQ2618322687; 50°59′23″N 0°12′13″W	1193369	St Mary Magdalene's Church More images	
Holy Trinity Church	Cuckfield	Parish church	12th century foundations	10 September 1951	TQ3035724473; 51°00′18″N 0°08′36″W	1191625	Holy Trinity Church More images	
Sackville College	East Grinstead	Almshouse	1609	28 January 1948	TQ3975438037; 51°07′28″N 0°00′16″W	1248768	Sackville College More images	
St Margaret's Convent	East Grinstead	Guest House	1889	2 August 1972	TQ3919938960; 51°07′59″N 0°00′43″W	1248986	St Margaret's Convent More images	
Standen	East Grinstead	Country house	1894	28 January 1948	TQ3896835598; 51°06′10″N 0°00′59″W	1249027	Standen More images	
St John the Baptist's Church	Clayton	Parish church	pre-Conquest	28 October 1957	TQ2992013963; 50°54′38″N 0°09′12″W	1286147	St John the Baptist's Church More images	
St Giles' Church	Horsted Keynes	Parish church	12th century	28 October 1957	TQ3837428599; 51°02′24″N 0°01′40″W	1025684	St Giles' Church More images	
Danny House	Hurstpierpoint	Country house	Early 16th century	28 October 1957	TQ2848814895; 50°55′09″N 0°10′24″W	1285424	Danny House More images	
Newtimber Place	Newtimber	House	16th century	28 October 1957	TQ2689513728; 50°54′33″N 0°11′47″W	1025629	Newtimber Place More images	
Holy Trinity Church	Poynings	Parish church	about 1370	28 October 1957	TQ2645912052; 50°53′39″N 0°12′12″W	1285135	Holy Trinity Church More images	
Church of the Transfiguration	Pyecombe	Parish church	12th century	28 October 1957	TQ2917312604; 50°53′55″N 0°09′52″W	1025593	Church of the Transfiguration More images	
St Peter's Church	Twineham	Parish church	Early 16th century	28 October 1957	TQ2526919991; 50°57′57″N 0°13′03″W	1284819	St Peter's Church More images	
Gravetye Manor	West Hoathly	House	1596	28 October 1957	TQ3617734017; 51°05′22″N 0°03′25″W	1182310	Gravetye Manor More images	
St Margaret's Church	West Hoathly	Parish church	1060 circa	28 October 1957	TQ3633132576; 51°04′35″N 0°03′19″W	1182137	St Margaret's Church More images	

=== Worthing ===
Name	Location	Type	Completed	Date designated	Grid ref. Geo-coordinates	Entry number	Image	Ref.
Castle Goring	Worthing	Country house	1798	11 October 1949	TQ1026805644; 50°50′23″N 0°26′07″W	1025839	Castle Goring More images	
St Mary's Church	Broadwater	Parish church	Transitional-Norman	11 October 1949	TQ1466204395; 50°49′40″N 0°22′24″W	1025810	St Mary's Church More images	
The Old Palace	West Tarring	House	13th century	11 October 1949	TQ1327204010; 50°49′28″N 0°23′35″W	1250618	The Old Palace More images	

== See also ==
- Grade II* listed buildings in West Sussex
