= British Tomato Growers' Association =

UK non-profit organization

- Abbreviation: BTGA
- Formation: 1997
- Legal status: Non-profit organization
- Purpose: Tomato growing
- Location: Barnham, West Sussex, UK
- Region served: UK
- Members: Tomato growers
- Chairman: Nigel Bartle
- Website: www.britishtomatoes.co.uk

The British Tomato Growers' Association is an organisation based in West Sussex that represents tomato growers in the UK.

== Structure ==
The UK is only 5% self-sufficient in tomatoes. The organisation represents over 90% of tomato growers in the UK (around 850). The British Tomato Season runs from March to October.

The Board of Directors as of 2025 is:

- Simon Conway - BTGA Chair
- Paul Faulkner (Treasurer and Company Secretary) - EVG
- Richard Diplock - Green House Growers
- Janann Durnford - Red Roofs Nursery
- Roly Holt - R & L Holt
- Rob James - Thanet Earth
- John Overvoorde - Delfland Nurseries
- Matthew Simon - Glinwell Plc

== Events ==
British Tomato Week takes place in May. Every September the British Tomato Growers' Association hosts a conference. In 2024 the British Tomato Growers' Association held the conference on 26 September.
