= St Peter's Church, Twineham =

St Peter's, Twineham
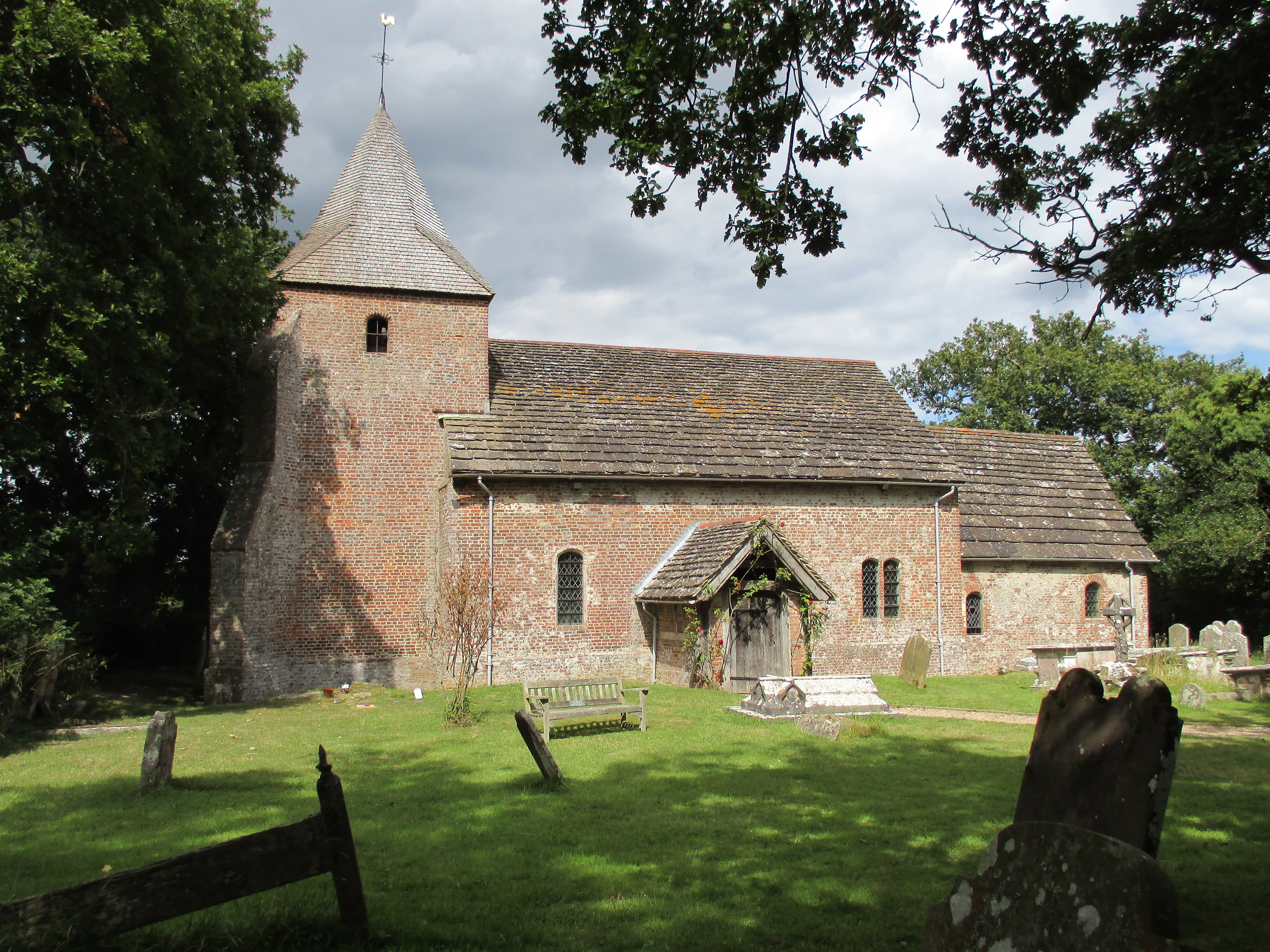
- St Peter's, seen from the south
- St Peter's, Twineham
- 50°57′56.7″N 0°13′2.6″W
- OS grid reference: TQ 25272 19989
- Location: Church Lane, Twineham, Haywards Heath, West Sussex, RH17 5NR
- Country: England
- Denomination: Church of England
- Website: A church near you: St Peter's

History
- Status: Parish church
- Dedication: Saint Peter

Architecture
- Functional status: Active
- Heritage designation: Grade I listed building
- Designated: 28 October 1957
- Style: Tudor
- Years built: 1516 (by local tradition)

Specifications
- Length: 72 feet (21.9 m) (External)
- Width: 25 feet (7.6 m) (External)
- Materials: Brick

Administration
- Province: Canterbury
- Diocese: Chichester
- Archdeaconry: Horsham
- Deanery: Hurst
- Benefice: Albourne with Sayers Common and Twineham
- Parish: Albourne, Sayers Common and Twineham (ASCaT)

Clergy
- Vicar: Interregnum

St Peter's Church is the Church of England parish church of Twineham, a village in the Mid Sussex District of West Sussex, England. The church, with St Barthomew's in Albourne and Christ Church in Sayers Common, serves the modern ecclesiastical parish of Albourne, Sayers Common and Twineham (ASCaT).

The church is Tudor, probably dating from the early 16th century. According to local tradition it was built in 1516, early in the reign of Henry VIII and before the English Reformation. The church is built of brick, consisting of a chancel, nave, south porch, and west tower, with a shingled oak spire. The church was sympathetically restored in 1894, when an organ-chamber was added on the north side of the chancel.

The church is a Grade I listed building, included on the National Heritage List for England ‘for the rarity of small early C16 churches’ (List Entry Number 1284819, first listed 28 October 1957).

== See also ==
- Grade I listed buildings in West Sussex
- List of places of worship in Mid Sussex
