= St Mary Our Lady, Sidlesham =

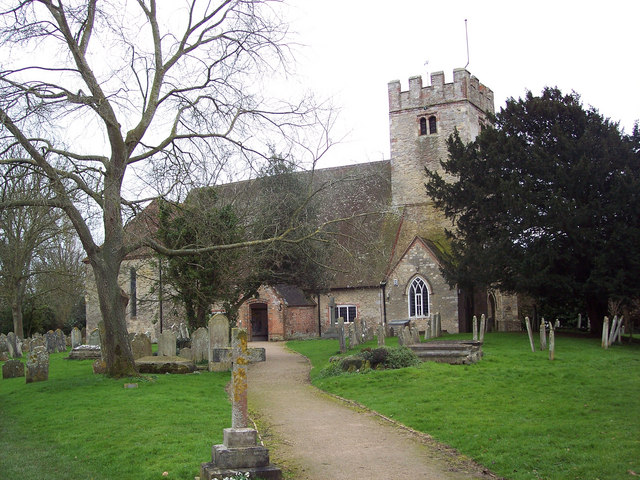
- The church originates from c. 1200
- St Mary Our Lady, Sidlesham
- 50.784542°N 0.787807°W
- Location: Church Farm Lane; Sidlesham; West Sussex; PO20 7RE
- Country: England
- Denomination: Church of England
- Website: https://www.stmary-sidlesham.org.uk

History
- Status: Parish church
- Founded: c.1200
- Dedication: St Mary Our Lady

Architecture
- Functional status: Active
- Style: Norman

Administration
- Province: Canterbury
- Diocese: Chichester
- Archdeaconry: Chichester
- Deanery: Chichester
- Parish: Sidlesham

Clergy
- Priest: Fr Christopher Brading

St Mary Our Lady is the parish church of Sidlesham in West Sussex, England. The family friendly church is down a short lane off the Chichester to Selsey road, by some thatched cottages. The current church originates from around 1200, probably on the site of an earlier Saxon church.

== History ==
The manor of Sidlesham was conferred by the Saxon monarch Cædwalla on Saint Wilfred, as a portion of his gift to the see of Selsey. Wilfrid had arrived in the then, kingdom of the South Saxons in 681 and remained there for five years evangelising and baptising the people. The manor continued to be held by the Bishops of Selsey until the see was transferred to Chichester in 1075. At the time of the Domesday Book (1086), it was held by the Bishop of Chichester in demesne and assessed at 12 hides. The gift was confirmed by William the Conqueror and the manor remained in church hands until the reign of Elizabeth I. The rectory of Sidlesham was a prebend of Chichester Cathedral and in 1291 it was valued at £30.

It is believed that the current church that was begun in the late 12th century or early 13th century replaced an earlier Saxon church.

== Buildings ==
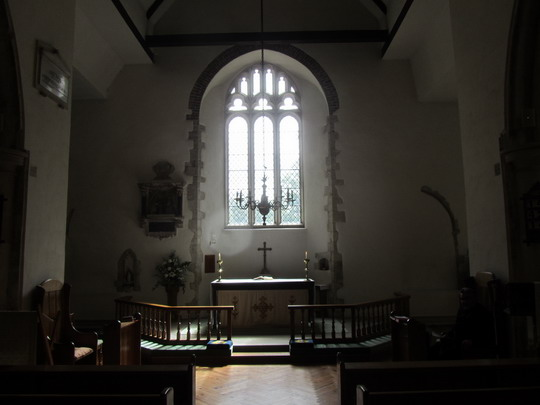
St Mary's altar with candlelabra in front.

The style of the building is early English. As built, the church was cruciform, with a chancel tower, transepts and aisles. It is built of stone rubble with ashlar dressings, the porch is of brick and the roofs are tiled.Originally the Chancel extended beyond the bounds of the existing east wall. There were two Chantry chapels and, possibly, two aisles built in the 14th century. There was also a vestry to the north of the Chapel area. The north chapel and part of the Chancel were allowed to fall into ruin, probably in the early 16th century, but were rebuilt, using much of the original materials, shortly after 1660. During this rebuilding, the east window was moved to the current position, giving the church the unusual T-shape it has now.

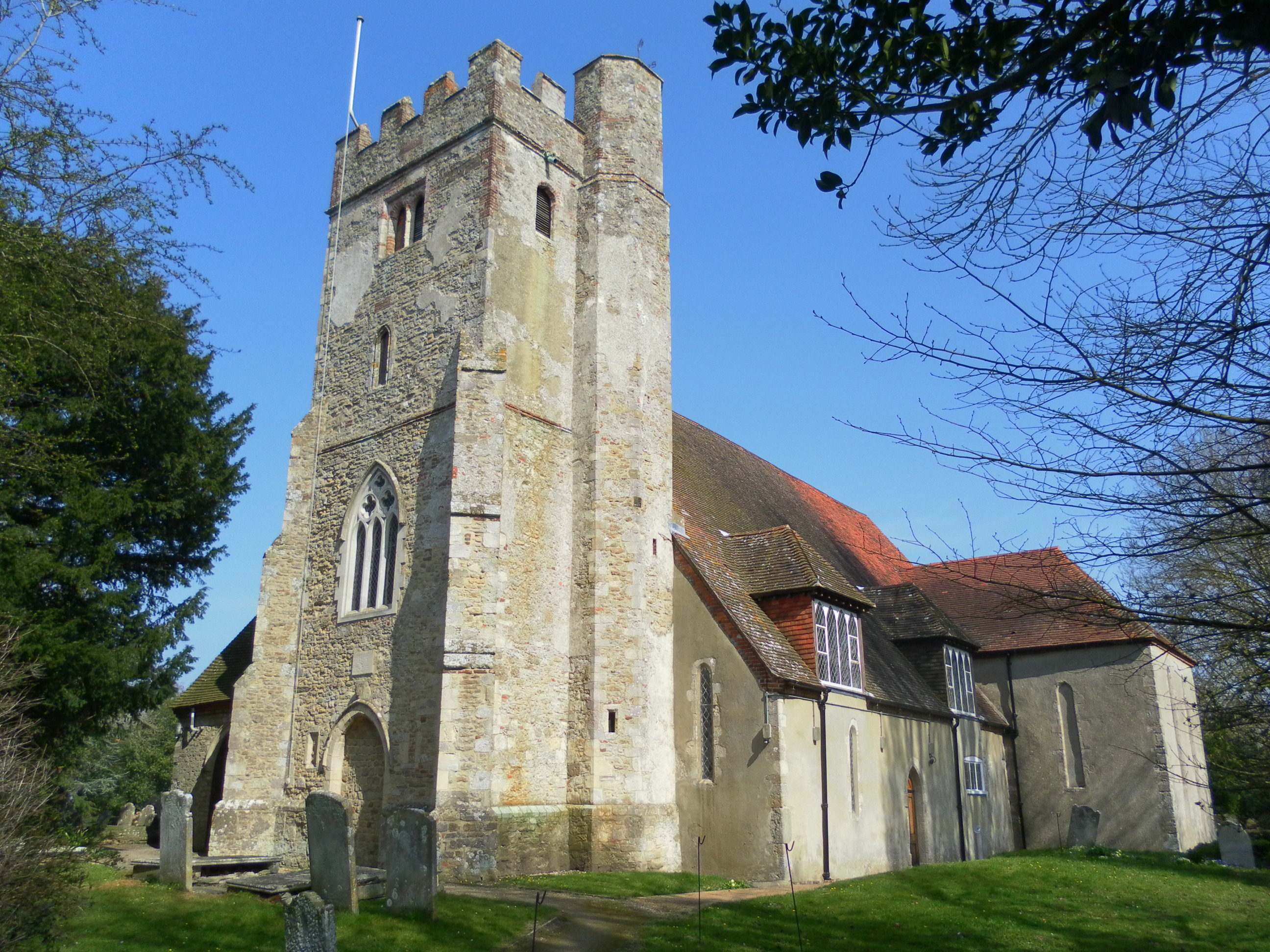
The church has a prominent tower.

The Chancel area is traditionally, the responsibility of the Vicar, the remainder of the building being that of the Church Wardens. It seems possible that, at some time, there was a disagreement about this since, to make it absolutely clear two small stones inscribed, "Chancel Boundary, 1814" were inserted in the eastern columns. The niches (or piscinas), adjacent to the Altar, are original and were used for the cleansing of the Holy vessels, after celebration of the Holy Communion. An aumbry has been built into the wall, adjacent to the Altar, to keep the Blessed sacrament

During the Middle Ages, the nave must have been very dark, as the only light came from the three narrow windows in both the north and south walls and two in the west wall. In 1596, three of these windows were converted to oblong windows

The font, adjacent to this window, is about the same age as the church and is typical of early Sussex work. It was removed from the church, during the Civil War and its weather-beaten and rather battered appearance may be the result of it having been buried during this time. It was re-erected in 1660. There is a drain, from the font, which discharges just above the tiled floor. An Edict requires that the water in the font, which has been blessed, should be collected and cast away outside the church. In the old days, it was suspected that if this action was not taken, the water might be used for witchcraft purposes.

In the 18th century, side galleries and large box pews were constructed the incisions to support the galleries can be seen, cut into pillars. It seems likely that, to compensate for the reduction of light, led to the villagers subscribing to the splendid brass candelabrum, installed in 1750.

There is an iron screen, dating from 1815, in the north chapel, that is a fine example of the work of Sussex blacksmiths.

The brick north porch and segment-headed doorway are late 18th century.

On 3 September 2017, the Bishop of Chichester opened the Parish rooms, a building adjacent to the church. The purpose of the rooms, according to the St Mary's website, is to provide 21st-century facilities to the church.

== Music ==
In the 15th century, the tower was added, complete with a minstrel's gallery; at the same time bells were hung, music for the services would have been provided by a village orchestra, comprising flute, fife, bassoon and fiddle. In 1850, a harmonium replaced the orchestra to provide music in the church.

The current organ, in the organ loft at the west end of the church, came from the Chapel of St Luke in the Radcliffe Infirmary, Oxford and is a 2 manual instrument by G M Holdich.In its former location in Oxford the organ was regularly played by the pianist and composer Jack Gibbons who as a child held the position of organist at the Radcliffe Infirmary's St Luke's Chapel.

The church has both a junior and adult choir for the services. St Mary's has a particularly fine acoustic and is the home of a long-established concert series "Music in Church", as well as being the venue for other performances.

== Bells ==
The tower originally held three bells, however there are now only two. The third one was recorded as "missing" in 1724. The remaining two consist of a tenor bell, that was cast around 1390, possibly by William Beresford (Note: Also known as William Burford.) in East Sussex and the Sidlesham bell that was cast in 1611 by Thomas Giles.

== War memorial ==
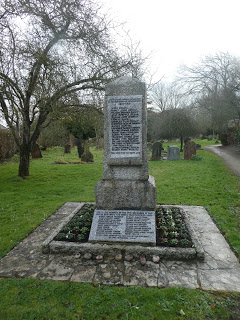
The War Memorial

The Sidlesham War Memorial is a grade II listed structure. It is located within the churchyard and consists of a squat obelisk on a square plinth. It is set within a small kerbed enclosure. It was originally constructed in the 1920s to commemorate the 20 Sidlesham people who lost their lives in the First World War.

There was an addition dedicated in 1948 to the people who lost their lives in the Second World War. Coincidentally and unusually it was for 20 people as in the First World War.

The graveyard has a total of eight graves commemorated by the Commonwealth War Graves Commission. There are three war graves dating from the First World War and five from the Second World War.

== Cathedral 950 ==
As part of the Cathedral celebrating 950 years since its foundation, when the see was moved from Selsey to Chichester, a Pilgrim route has been created between the site of Saint Wilfrid's cathedral at Selsey and that of Chichester. One of the places on that route is St Mary Our Lady at Sidlesham.

== See also ==
- Grade I listed buildings in West Sussex
- List of bishops of Chichester and precursor offices
- List of current places of worship in Chichester (district)

== Sources ==
- BBC (2007). "The Radcliffe Remembered". Archived from the original on 26 September 2018.
- Bede (1990). Sherley-Price, Leo; Farmer, D.H. (eds.). Bede:Ecclesiastical History of the English People. London: Penguin. ISBN 0-14-044565-X.
- BHO (2011). "British History Online". Archived from the original on 20 August 2011.
- British Pilgrimage Trust (2025). "Four short routes to Chichester Cathedral".
- CWGC (2011). "Commonwealth War Graves commission". Archived from the original on 24 February 2019.
- Doves guide (2025). "Sidlesham, West Sussex, S Mary Our Lady". Central Council of Church Bell Ringers.
- Guise, Stephen (2017). Historical Guide to the Parish Church of St Mary Our Lady Sidlesham. Published by author.
- Historic England (2017). "Sidlesham War Memorial, St Mary Our Lady graveyard, Sidlesham (1441567)". National Heritage List for England.
- Horsfield, Thomas (1835). The History, Antiquities and Topography of the County of Sussex. Vol II. London: Nichols and Sons. OCLC 888814971.
- Lowther, M.A. (1870). A compendious history of Sussex. Vol II. Lewes, Sussex: G P Bacon. OCLC 699789356.
- Morris, John, ed. (1976). Domesday Book: Sussex. Chichester: Phillimore. ISBN 0-85033-146-3.
- Music at Saint Mary (2011). "St Mary's music pages". Archived from the original on 26 April 2012.
- NPOR (2026). "Sussex, West, Sidlesham, St. Mary Our Lady, Church Lane". National Pipe Organ Register.
- Sussex Parishes (2011). "St. Mary Our Lady, Sidlesham. Sussex Parish Churches". Archived from the original on 13 April 2014.
- Webmaster. "St Mary's Website". Archived from the original on 26 April 2012.
