= Holy Trinity Church, Rudgwick =

Holy Trinity Church
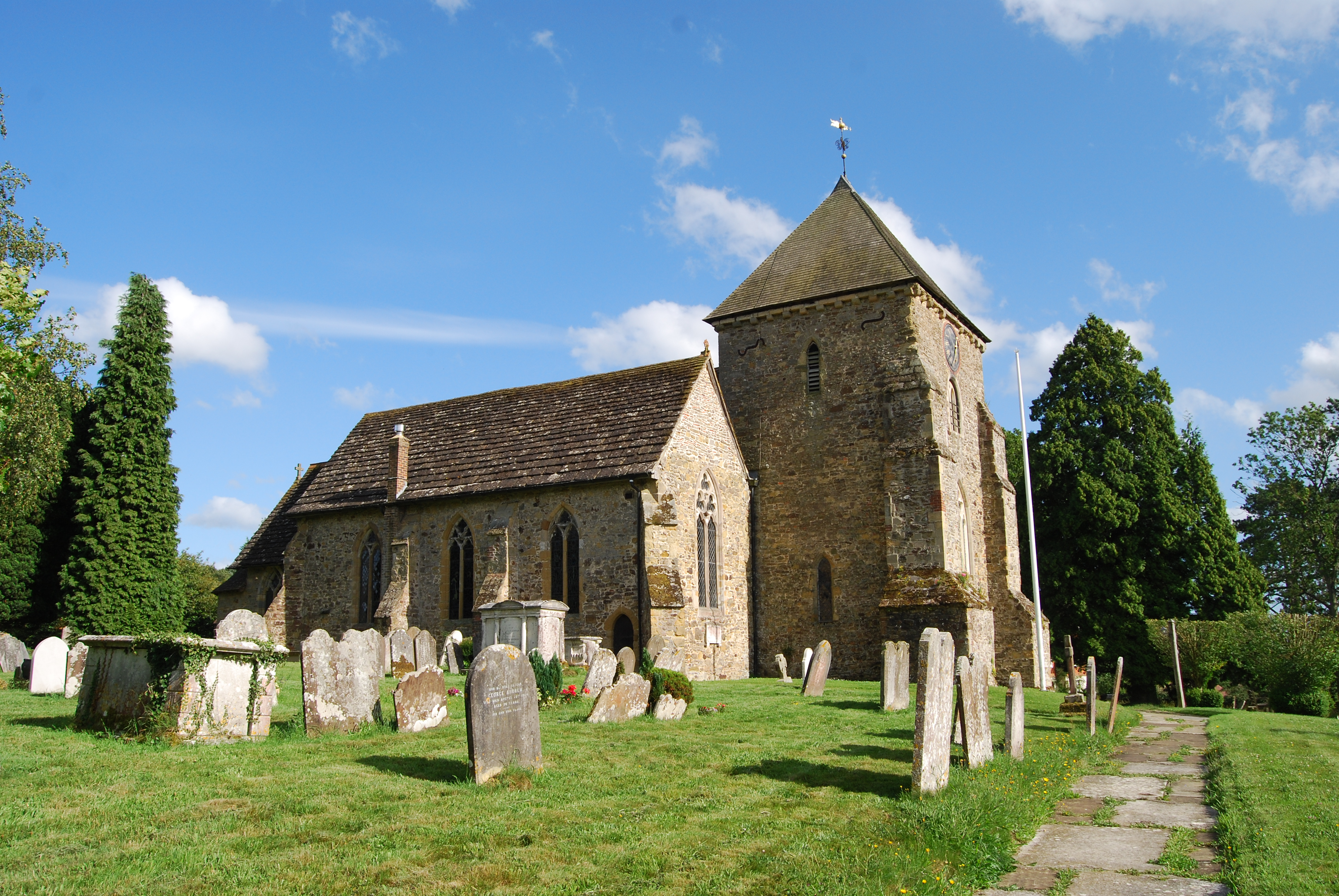
- The church from the north west
- Holy Trinity Church
- 51.0976°N 0.4435°W
- Location: Church Street, Rudgwick, Horsham, West Sussex RH12 3DD
- Country: England
- Denomination: Church of England
- Website: www.rudgwickchurch.org.uk

History
- Status: Parish church
- Founded: 12th century
- Dedication: Holy Trinity

Architecture
- Functional status: Active
- Heritage designation: Grade I
- Designated: 22 September 1959

Specifications
- Capacity: 178

Administration
- Province: Province of Canterbury
- Diocese: Diocese of Chichester
- Archdeaconry: Horsham
- Deanery: Horsham
- Parish: Holy Trinity Rudgwick

Clergy
- Archbishop: Archbishop of Canterbury
- Bishop(s): Bishop of Chichester, Bishop of Horsham
- Vicar: Rev. Martin King

Holy Trinity Church is the Anglican parish church of Rudgwick, a village in the Horsham district of West Sussex, England.

The oldest part of the church is the font, which is made from Horsham or Sussex Marble and dates from the 12th century. The tower of the present church was built in the 13th century though much of the material probably came from the older church that was pulled down to make way for the current building. Parts of the south wall may have been retained from the original church and so may be as old as the tower. The majority of the rest of the church dates from the 14th century with some from the 15th. The vestry is Victorian. The church is a Grade I Listed building.

== History ==
Holy Trinity dates from the 13th century, when about the year 1260 Alard the Fleming who owned the great manor of Pulborough and was granted the right to hold a fair at Rudgwick on “the eve, feast and morrow of the Holy Trinity” (Trinity Sunday).

== List of rectors, vicars and curates ==
=== Rectors ===
| Date | Rector |
|---|---|
| Before 1275-6 | John de Swyneford |
| 1275-6- | Robert de Schardeburg |
| 1287-8 | Hugo de Stanes |
| 1351-2 | Alan de Boys |
| 1355 | Alexander |
| 1363 - 4 | John de Lyndeford |
| 1405 | David Thomas |
| 1405 - | Richard Monk |
| 1411, 1413 | Thomas Clerk |
| 1427 | Robert Payton |
| 1427- | William Papelon |
| 1430 | John (Bishop of Eunachdon) |
| 1443 | John Marchall |
| 1443 - | Richard Clyff |
| 1445 | Richard Baynton, presented |
| | (Appropriation to take place at next avoidance) |
| 1478 - 9 | William Holden |
| 1482 | John Chambyr |
| 1500 | James Boniface |
| 1521–1536 | William Aspull (Ashpole) |
| 1548 | William Burton |

=== Vicars ===
| Date | Vicar |
|---|---|
| 1270-1 | Thomas |
| 1355-6, 1367-8 | Alexander |
| 1396-7- | John Averay |
| 1429 | Robert Tailour |
| 1429 - | Robert Potterne |
| 1430, 1450-1 | William Illory |
| -1478-9 | Richard Lovelady, resigned |
| 1478-9 - | Elias Garnet |
| 1500 | Richard Mathew, died |
| 1500, 1536 | John Frankysshe |
| 1541 | William Benett |
| 1543, 1546 | George Merbury (Morbourie) |
| 1546, 1547 | William Mason |
| 1549, 1571 | William Styrar (Sterat, Tyrer) |
| 1576 | Nicholas Burrell |
| 1611 | Owen (Eugene) Stockton |
| 1612-13 | William Wady |
| 1624 | George Benson |
| 1627 | Samuel Eburne |
| 1637 | Syvester Adams |
| 1646 | Thomas Mead |
| 1660–1665 | Thomas Mead |
| 166- | Tobias Henshawe |
| 1673 | William Loriner |
| 1674-5 | George Rutt |
| 1716–1741 | Richard Cotton |
| 1741–1768 | Humphrey Crawley |
| 1768–1776 | John Jones |
| 1776–1813 | Robert John Sayer |
| 1813–1831 | Roger Evans |
| 1831–1833 | Henry Browne |
| 1833–1866 | George Redaway Matthews |
| 1866–1908 | Benjamin Joseph Edward Drury |
| 1908–1916 | Arthur Frederick Young |
| 1916–1927 | William Hampton Chambers |
| 1927–1951 | Alfred Norman Wynn |
| 1951–1965 | John William Tanner |
| 1966–1977 | John Charles Hart |
| 1977–1989 | Theodore (Tom) Arthur Barker Charles |
| Dec 1989 – June 1998 | John Dudley Morris |
| Nov 1998 – Sept 2009 | Richard Charles Jackson (subsequently Bishop of Lewes now Bishop of Hereford) |
| April 2010 – Present | Martin Peter James King |

=== Curates ===
| Date | Curate |
|---|---|
| 25 June 2016 – 2 February 2020 | Peter Deaves |

== The church today ==
Holy Trinity Church was designated a Grade I Listed building on 22 September 1959. The graveyard was expanded in 2023, after consecration by the Bishop of Horsham.

== See also ==
- Bishop of Chichester
- Bishop of Horsham
- Bishop of Lewes
- Church of England
- Diocese of Chichester
- Grade I listed buildings in West Sussex
- List of places of worship in Horsham (district)
