= Canon Gate =

Grade I listed gatehouse in West Sussex, England

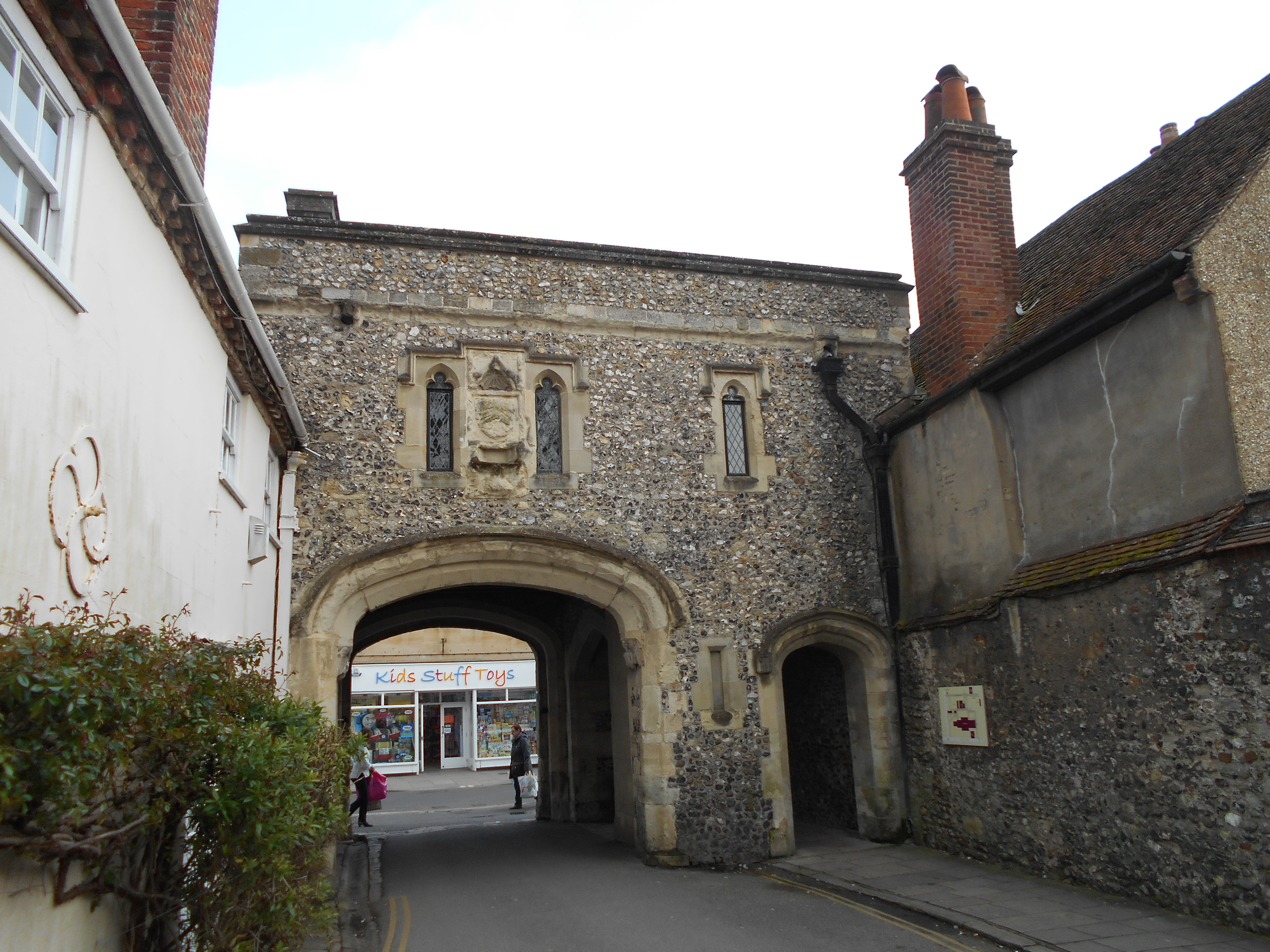
- Canon Gate in March 2015

- Location of Canon Gate within West Sussex
- 50°50′6.36″N 0°46′46.84″W
- Location: Chichester, West Sussex, England
- OS grid reference: SU 86030 04664

Listed Building – Grade I
- Designated: 5 July 1950; 76 years ago

Canon Gate or Canon Lane Gate is a Grade I listed gatehouse in Chichester, West Sussex.

== History ==
Canon Gate was erected during the reign of King Richard III, who ruled England from 1483 to 1485. The building fell into disrepair, but was restored in 1894 by Ewan Christian.

== Detailing ==
The building is made from flint, with stone dressings. The southern facing arch is inscribed with the arms of William of Wykeham or Winchester College.

== See also ==
- Grade I listed buildings in West Sussex
