= St Peter's Church, Cowfold =

Church in West Sussex, England

St Peter's Church
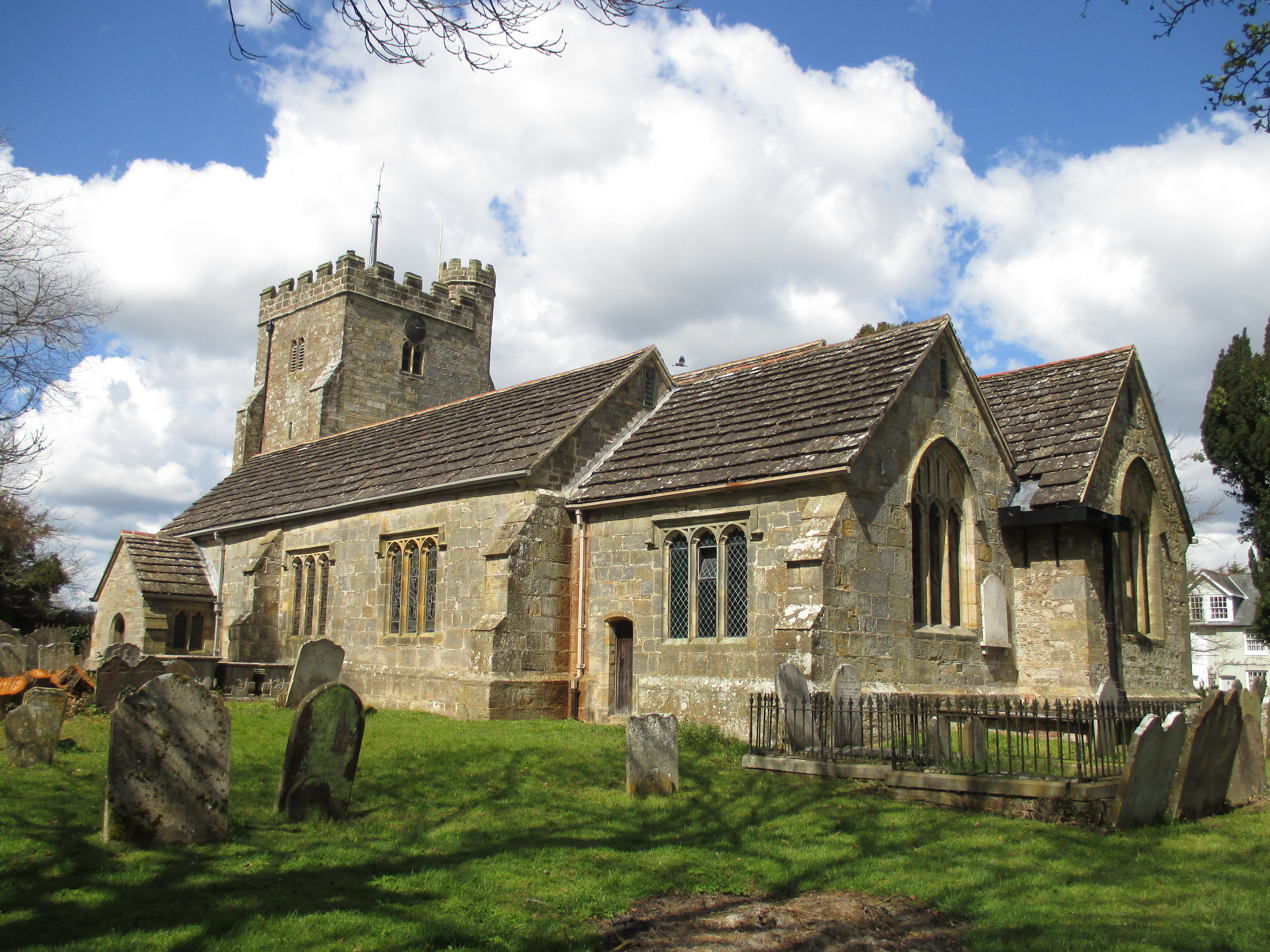
- St Peter's Church
- 50°59′24.2″N 0°16′25.1″W
- Address: The Street, Cowfold, Horsham, West Sussex, RH13 8BW
- Country: England
- Denomination: Church of England

History
- Status: Parish church
- Founded: Before 1232
- Dedication: Saint Peter

Architecture
- Architectural type: Chapel
- Style: Early English and Perpendicular

Specifications
- Materials: Rubble and ashlar

Administration
- Archdiocese: Canterbury
- Diocese: Chichester
- Archdeaconry: Horsham
- Deanery: Horsham
- Parish: Cowfold

Clergy
- Priest: Sue Wharton

St Peter's Church, Cowfold is a Church of England parish church in the village of Cowfold, West Sussex. First recorded in 1232 as a chapelry of St Peter's, Henfield, it still retains some features of the Early English original building but is mainly Perpendicular in style and, apart from some 19th-century arches, entirely medieval. It is known for its magnificent 15th-century memorial brass to Thomas Nelond, Prior of Lewes, its medieval stained glass, and its churchyard's rare "church marks" boundary fence.

English Heritage has listed St Nicholas' Church at Grade I for its architectural and historical importance.

== Location and churchyard ==
St Peter's Church stands at the centre of the village of Cowfold, within 100 meters of the intersection of two busy roads, the A272 and the A281, but screened from them by houses. On the southern and western sides the churchyard gives on to school playing fields and modern housing, and on the northern and eastern sides the adjacent 17th-century cottages give it, in the words of the architectural critic Ian Nairn, an "incredibly picturesque" effect, forming a "real picture-book group...worth all the praise it gets". One notable feature is the rare "church marks" boundary fence, dateable to 1682 but renovated in 1913 and again in 1981–1982. Like other church marks it is inscribed with the names of parish farms and houses, showing which used to be responsible for the maintenance of each section.

== History ==
The precise date of the church's foundation is unknown, but the nave and chancel have early 13th-century features. Certainly, it was in existence by 1232, probably as a chapelry of St Peter's Church, Henfield. The churchwardens' accounts record a payment made c. 1470 "for paynting of the Cherch", but no paintings remain. The porch and tower were built in the 15th century, and the south aisle in the 1530s or 1540s. From 1557 to 1801 Cowfold was served sometimes by resident vicars and sometimes by curates. Non-resident vicars during this period include, from 1603 to 1609, Robert Scott, embalmer to the king, and from 1609 to 1622 Roger Andrewes, Master of Jesus College, Cambridge. One of their successors, George Vintner, showed great pliability in surviving the religious turmoils of the mid-17th century. He was a "zealous loyalist" in 1641, a supporter of the Presbyterians and then of the Independents during the Commonwealth, conformed to the Act of Uniformity 1662, and, as James II's reign approached, favoured the Catholic cause. A period of stability from 1801 to 1876 saw two long-serving resident vicars, Richard Constable and William Bruère Otter. In 1851, according to Otter, about 500 people attended service every Sunday. The church was thoroughly restored in 1876–1877 by Hans Price and Matthias Grosholz, and the roofs were repaired in 1928. On 22 September 1959 it was listed at Grade I for its architectural and historical importance.

=== Living and patronage ===
At the end of the 13th century the glebe consisted of 15 acres of arable land. By 1839, when the tithes were commuted for £587 a year, this had expanded to 34 acres. The patronage of the church has since 1852 belonged to the bishop of London.

== Architecture ==
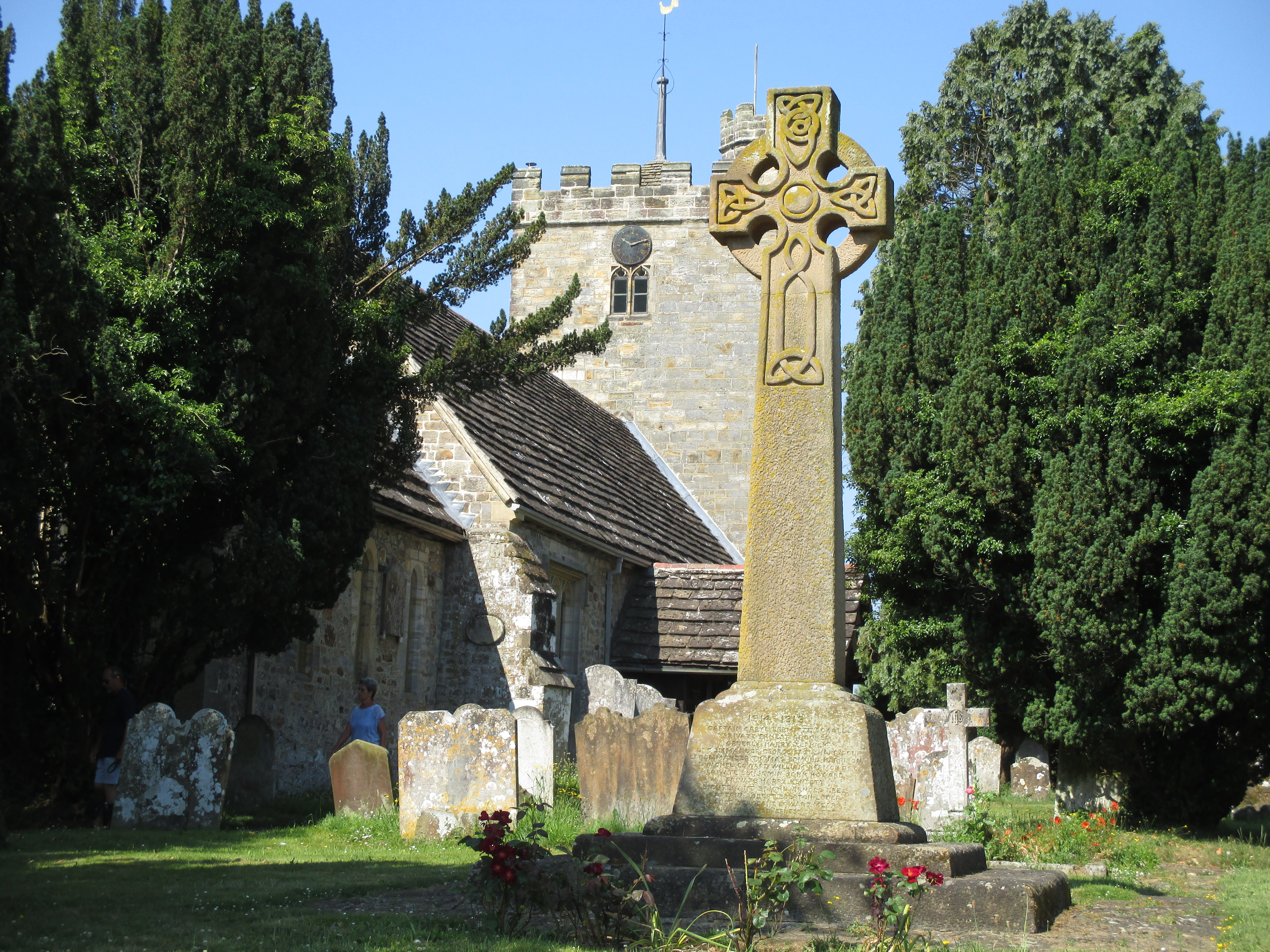
The war memorial in the churchyard

St Peter's is an almost wholly medieval church built of ashlar and rubble, consisting of a nave with a south aisle and a porch on the north, a chancel with a south chapel, and a west tower. It has been described as "An anthology of sturdy Wealden details. The solidity and lack of fuss is a great relief after other parts of the country." The nature of the original church can be seen in the Early English lancets of the chancel, those on the south side being blocked. The rest of the church is predominantly in the Perpendicular style. The north wall of the nave, though apparently 13th century, was remodelled in the late 15th century, and the tower and porch are also late 15th century, though parts of the porch have been heavily restored. Ian Nairn was impressed by the tower, calling it "thick, dependable [and] particularly happy". The roofing is of Horsham slabs, and there is no clerestory. The only major features of a later date are the arches connecting the nave, the chancel, and the south chapel, for all of which the 19th-century restorers are responsible.

== Stained glass ==
The second north lancet window has a stained-glass Crucifixion of which the date is uncertain; estimates range from the very end of the 13th century to the 14th or 15th century. Another north lancet window has 15th-century quarries with decorative flowers. The modern stained glass ranges in date from the 1860s to the 1930s. It includes a Crucifixion by the firm of Clayton and Bell, a Nativity from the Kempe studio, an Alexander Gibbs window, three of differing dates from the firm of James Powell and Sons designed by Frank Mann, Ernest Penwarden and James Humphries Hogan, and a single-light St Francis by Geoffrey Webb.

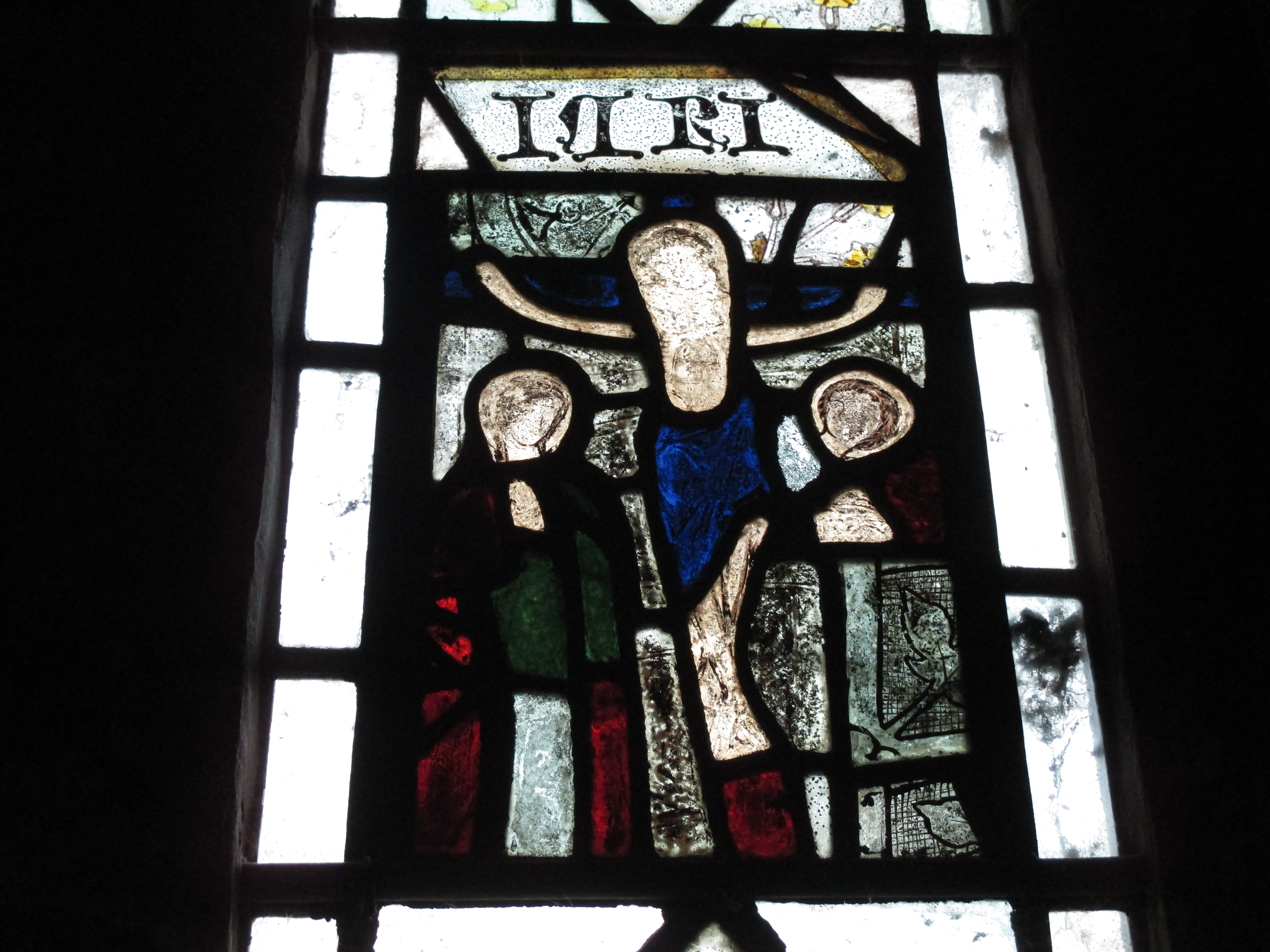
Detail of the medieval glass in the second lancet on the north side of the chancel

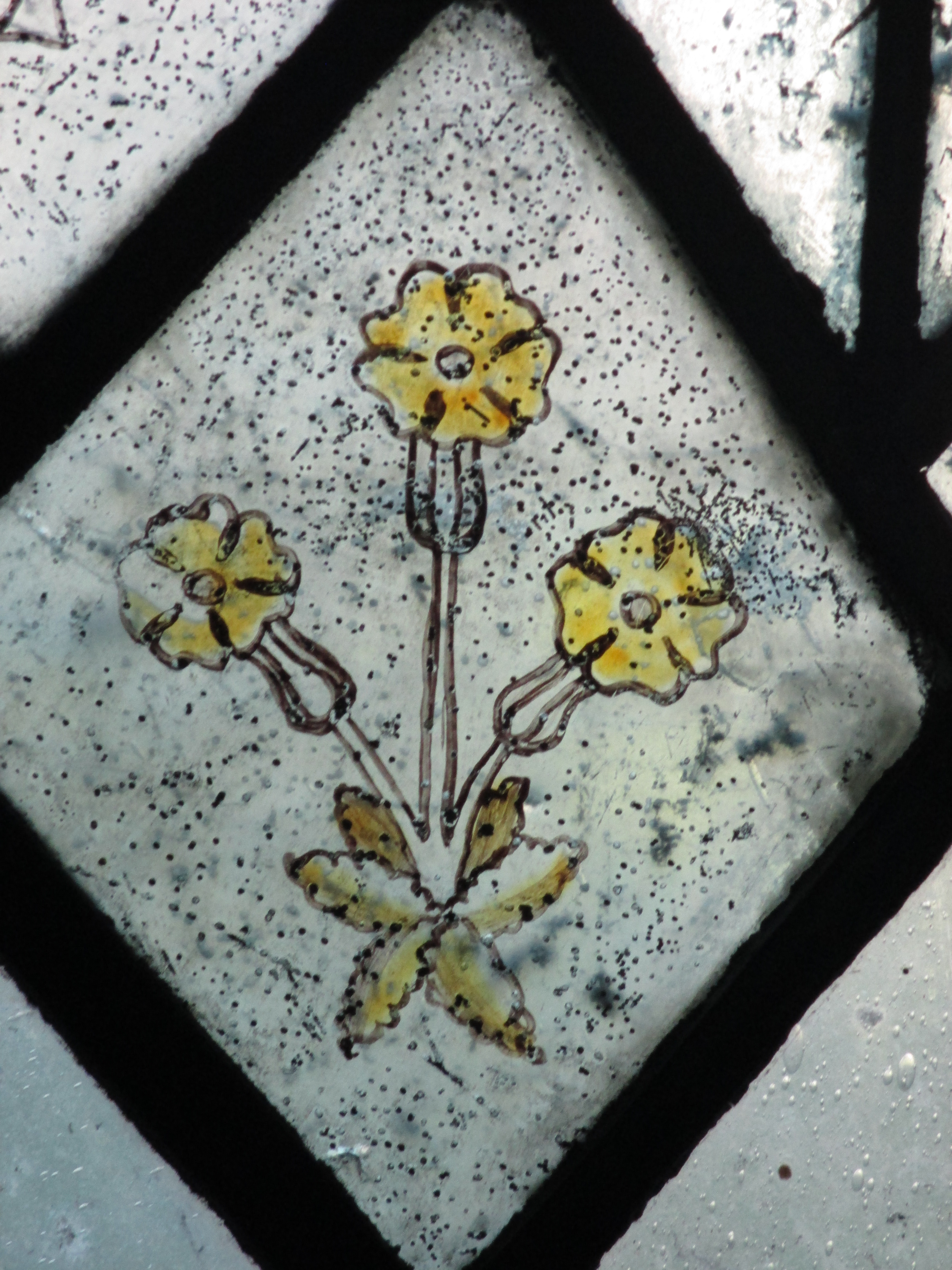
Detail of the medieval glass in the second lancet on the north side of the chancel

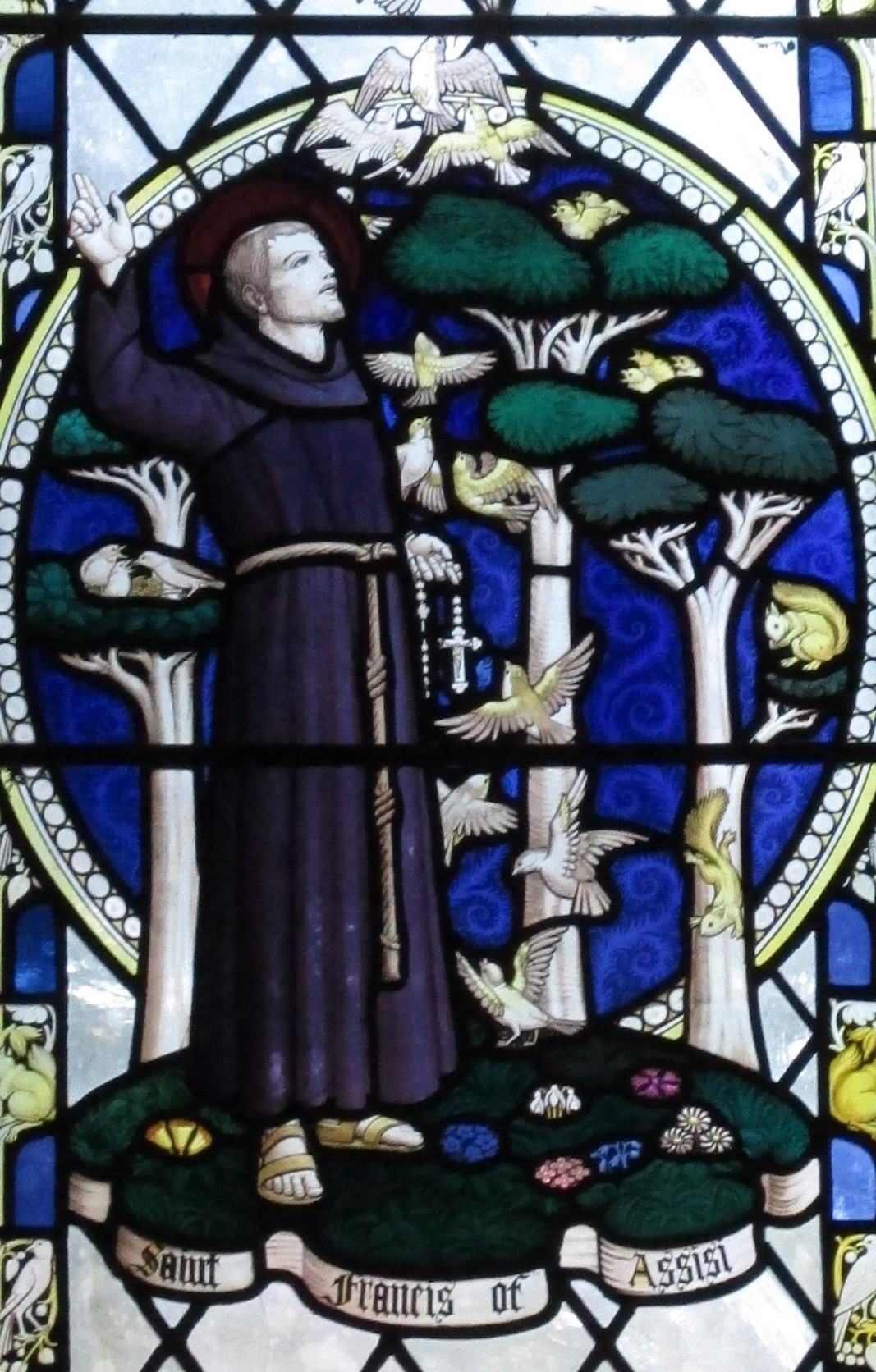
Detail of the third window of the north aisle, by Geoffrey Webb (1934)

== Fittings ==
Cowfold's font is octagonal with geometric designs, and from the churchwardens' accounts can be dated exactly to 1481/2. The church has six bells, one made by Brian Eldridge in 1629, two by William and Thomas Mears in 1789, and three by Mears and Stainbank in 1905. There are several items of silver plate: two alms dishes and a flagon, all dated 1726, and a communion cup and paten of 1741. In the south aisle is a chest made in the early 17th century.

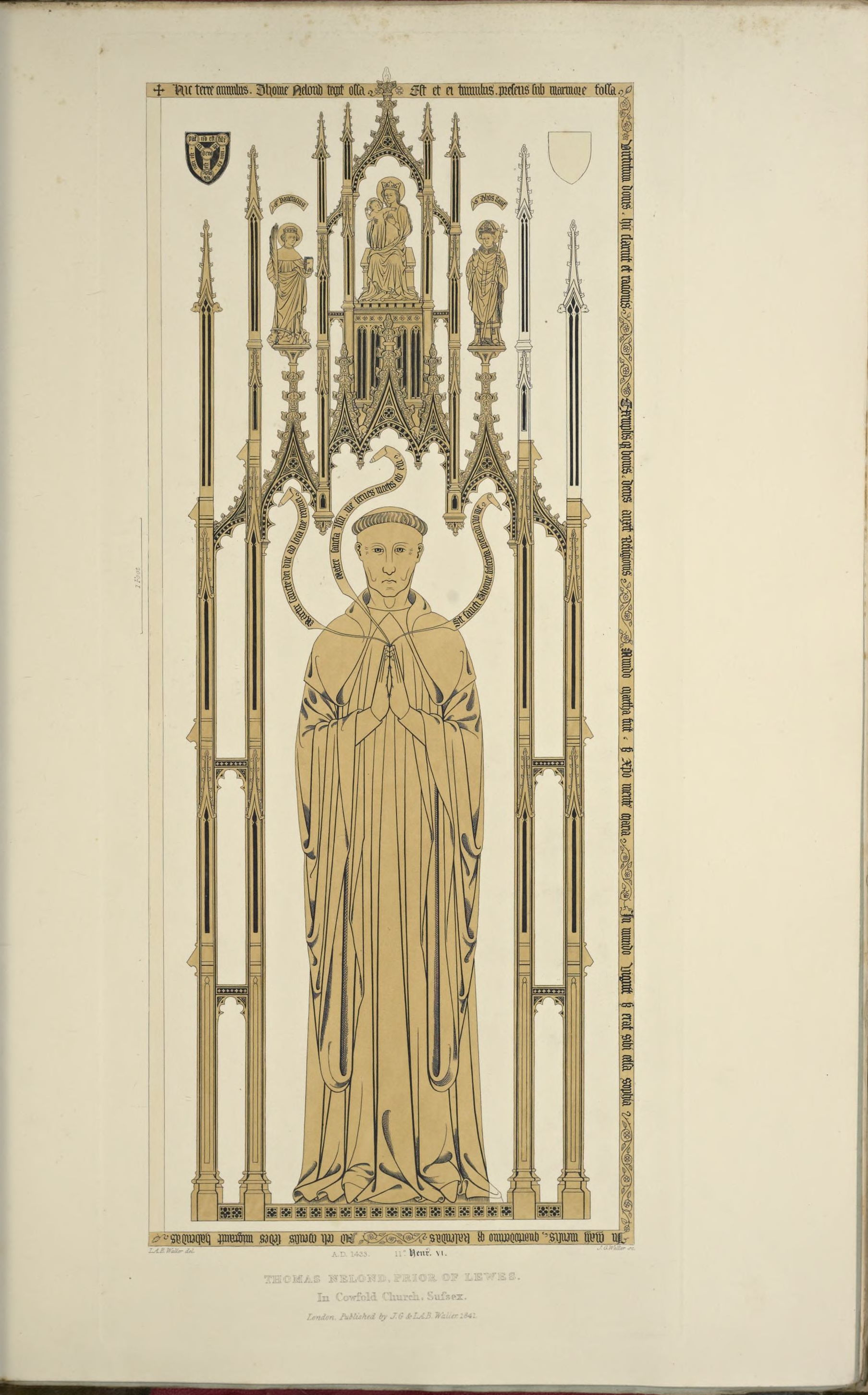
A 19th-century reproduction of the Nelond brass

== Brasses and monuments ==
The church's greatest treasure is certainly the Nelond memorial brass. It is considered the finest brass in Sussex and one of the finest in the country. Certainly, at a length of over 10 feet it is the largest Sussex brass. Mounted on the nave floor and permanently locked beneath a carpet for its own protection, it shows Thomas Nelond, Prior of Lewes from 1414 to 1432, life size in his Cluniac habit. Its triple canopy, "one of the finest in existence", depicts St Pancras, the Virgin and Child, and St Thomas Becket, all of whom are connected with Nelond's hands by three scrolls representing his prayers. The brass was made in London for Lewes Priory, and was probably moved from there to Cowfold at the Dissolution. There is also a second brass, much smaller, commemorating one John Agate (died 1548). The later monuments include one in the form of a draped sarcophagus by Sir Francis Chantrey.

== Parish registers ==
The baptism, marriage and burial registers survive from 1558 onward, the only major gaps being for the years 1634–1635 and 1643–1648. They are held by the West Sussex Record Office along with the banns registers from 1824 and the Bishops' Transcripts from 1606.

== The church today ==
St Peter's, Cowfold is now joined with Holy Trinity, Lower Beeding and St John's, Coolhurst in a united benefice. Services are held at 10.00 a.m. on most Sundays, and at 8.00 a.m. on the second and fourth Sundays of every month. 50 people attended an Easter Day service in 2023, and 253 a Christmas one. The church is open every day for visitors.

== See also ==
- Grade I listed buildings in West Sussex
- List of places of worship in Horsham District
