= Hardham Priory =

Augustinian priory in West Sussex, England

Coordinates: 50.9441°N 0.5291°W

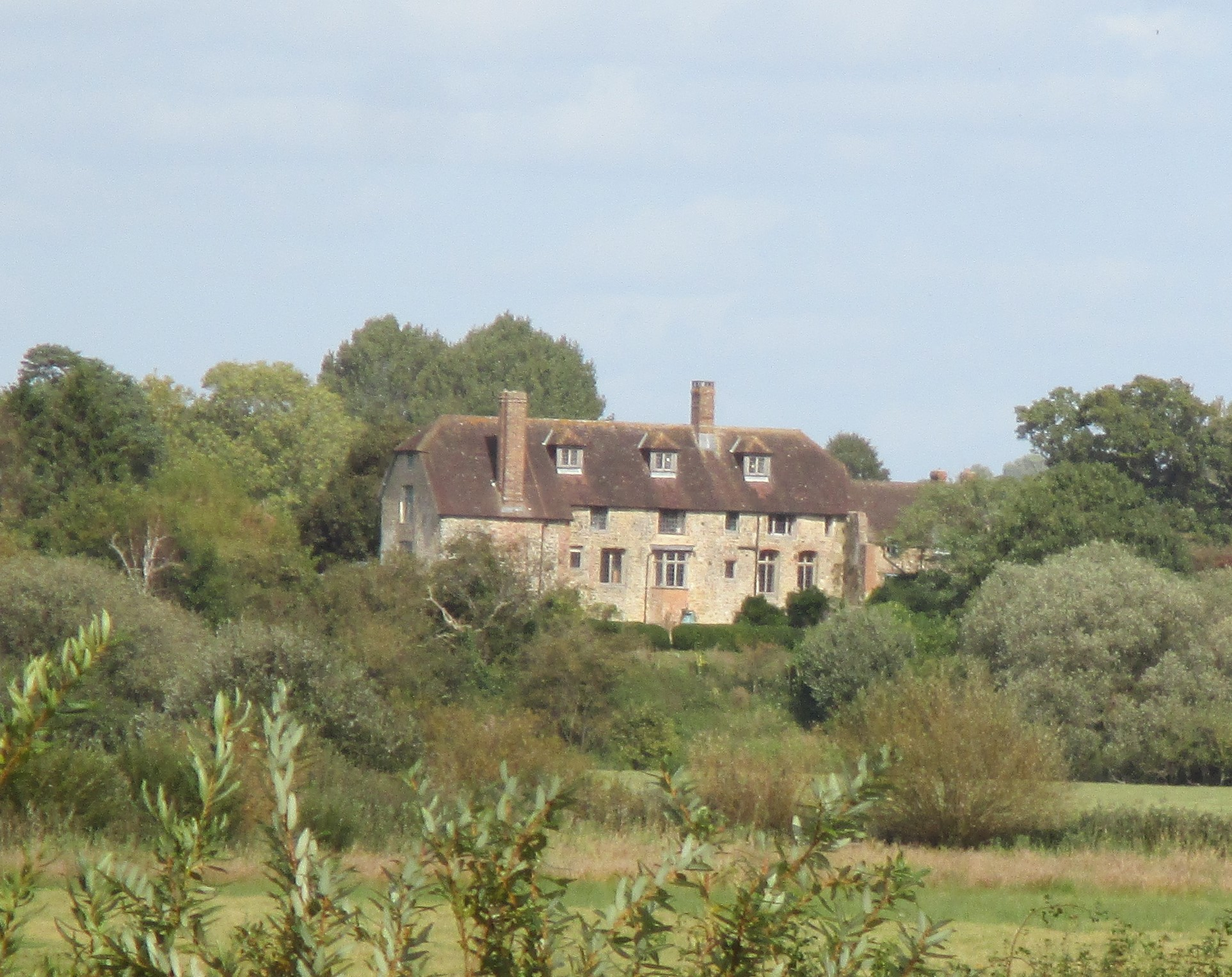
Hardham Priory Farmhouse

Hardham Priory was an Augustinian priory in Hardham, West Sussex, England.

It was founded around 1248 by Sir William Dawtrey as a priory of Black Canons of St Augustine, which was at first called Heringham Priory. It was enlarged by Sir William Pagnell during the reign of Edward III, but fell into disrepair in the late 15th century and was disbanded in 1534 as part of the Dissolution of the Monasteries.

Its remains stand in an area of water meadows next to the River Arun, 1/2 mile (0.80 km) southwest of the village of Hardham. The refectory building has been converted into a farmhouse, which is a Grade I listed building.

== Bibliography ==
- Nairn, Ian; Pevsner, Nikolaus (1965). The Buildings of England: Sussex. Harmondsworth: Penguin Books. ISBN 0-14-071028-0.
