= Field Place, Warnham =

Building in West Sussex, England

Coordinates: 51.0768°N 0.3637°W

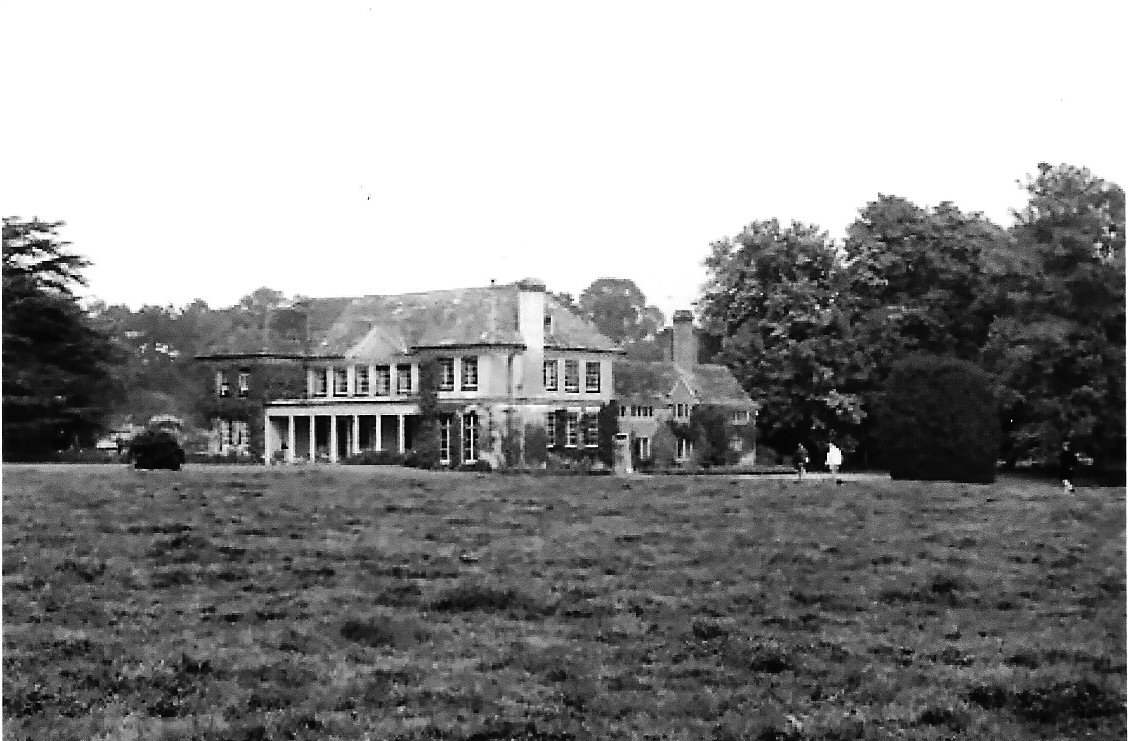
Field Place in 1961

Field Place is a Grade I listed house in Warnham, West Sussex, England. It is the birthplace of the poet Percy Bysshe Shelley, born there in 1792.

The house dates back to the thirteenth and fourteenth-centuries. It has been restored to the state it was in when Shelley lived there.

From written records, Field Place was built in about 1251 by Richard Felde, and this part is now the east wing. Dendochronology tests have shown that the oak timbers in the east wing Mediaeval Hall were saplings at the Conquest. The south wing was built around by 1325. and the north wing around 1375. The Michell family bought the estate in 1484 and clad it in stone. They owned the stone quarries at nearby Stammerham. In the late 15th century the west wing was added as a large hall with open to the roof timbers with king posts visible. This was also clad in stone in around the later 16th century with a central two storey porch in the Elizabethan style. In 1678, the stone was removed from the west wing and the timber frame clad in brick which the Michell family also produced. This front was Queen Anne in style. In 1707, it was bought by Edward Shelley. On his death, the house was inherited by his nephew John Shelley who was childless. On his death in 1791, soon after building the nearby coach houses and stables, it was inherited by Timothy Shelley (1753–1844) who became a baronet on the death of his father Bysshe Shelley. The poet Percy Bysshe Shelley (1792–1822) was his eldest son. The farm buildings and much of the land are owned indirectly by the current owners of the house. Percy Bysshe Shelley spent his youth at Field Place, but never lived there as an adult. His son Sir Percy Shelley, 3rd Baronet (1819–1889) inherited the property. in 1844 on the death of his grandfather Sir Timothy Shelley. The poet's eldest son Charles Shelley died in the house when only 12 from consumption which caused much grief to his grandparents. Mary Shelley (author of Frankenstein, widow of the poet and mother of Sir Percy Shelley lived at Field Place intermittently for some years in the middle of the 19th century.</ref>

G N Charrington, who had been a tenant, acquired the property in 1929, and restored the gardens by 1949. In 1982, Kenneth Pritchard Jones bought the house and restored it.
