= Sidlesham =

Village and parish in West Sussex, England

Coordinates: 50.7857°N 0.79036°W

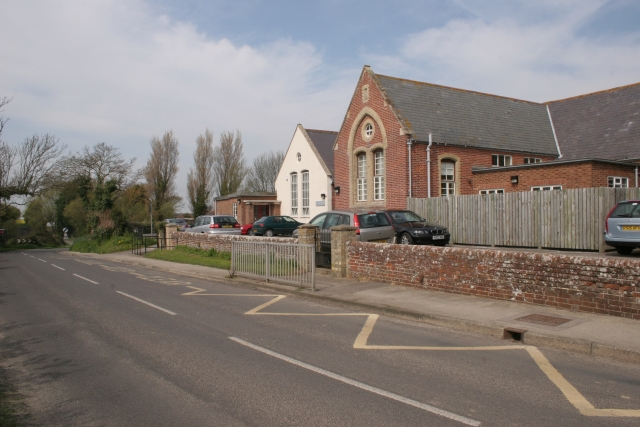
- Sidlesham Primary School

- Location within West Sussex
- Area: 17.53 km^{2} (6.77 sq mi)
- Population: 1,171. 2011 Census
  - Density: 65/km^{2} (170/sq mi)
- OS grid reference: SZ853991
  - London: 57 miles (92 km) NNE
- Civil parish: Sidlesham
- District: Chichester
- Shire county: West Sussex
- Region: South East
- Country: England
- Sovereign state: United Kingdom
- Post town: CHICHESTER
- Postcode district: PO20
- Dialling code: 01243
- Police: Sussex
- Fire: West Sussex
- Ambulance: South East Coast
- UK Parliament: Chichester
- Website: http://www.sidlesham.org/

Sidlesham is a small village and civil parish, on the Manhood Peninsula, five kilometres (3 miles) south of Chichester in the Chichester District of West Sussex, England. It has a small primary school. The area has had a prebendary since medieval times. The 13th-century church of St Mary Our Lady is built of stone rubble, not the usual flint of the area.

The parish has a land area of 1753 hectares (4330 acres). In the 2001 census 1139 people lived in 448 households, of whom 579 were economically active. At the 2011 Census the population had increased to 1,171.

The parish has fertile soils on the flat Chichester plain and there are many glasshouses around the village.

== Governance ==
An electoral list in the same name exists. This ward stretches North to Hunston with a total ward population at the 2011 Census of 2,428.

== History ==
The village has had a long history of farming and was made up of a group of farms including: Bakers, Chalder, Church, Easton, Ferry, Fletchers, Great Ham, Greenwood, Haise, Halsey, Ham, Highleigh, Jury, Keynor, Marblestone, Marsh, Oakhurst, Porthole, Redgate, Rookery, Shotfold and Street End. In 1935 the Sidlesham LSA was set up and "settlers" from the north east of England and South wales stayed in Keynor hut while their houses were built and they received training.

The Sidlesham LSA continued smallholding until its privatisation in 1983.

== Sport and leisure ==
The first definite mention of cricket in Sussex relates to ecclesiastical court records in 1611 which state that two parishioners of Sidlesham failed to attend church on Easter Sunday because they were playing cricket. They were fined 12d each and made to do penance.

Sidlesham has a Non-League football club Sidlesham F.C. who play at the Memorial Recreation Ground.

== Landmarks ==
The Site of Special Scientific Interest known as Pagham Harbour falls partly within the parish. The harbour and surrounding land is of national importance for both flora and fauna. The shingle spit is also of geological interest.
