= Barnham Court =

Listed building in West Sussex

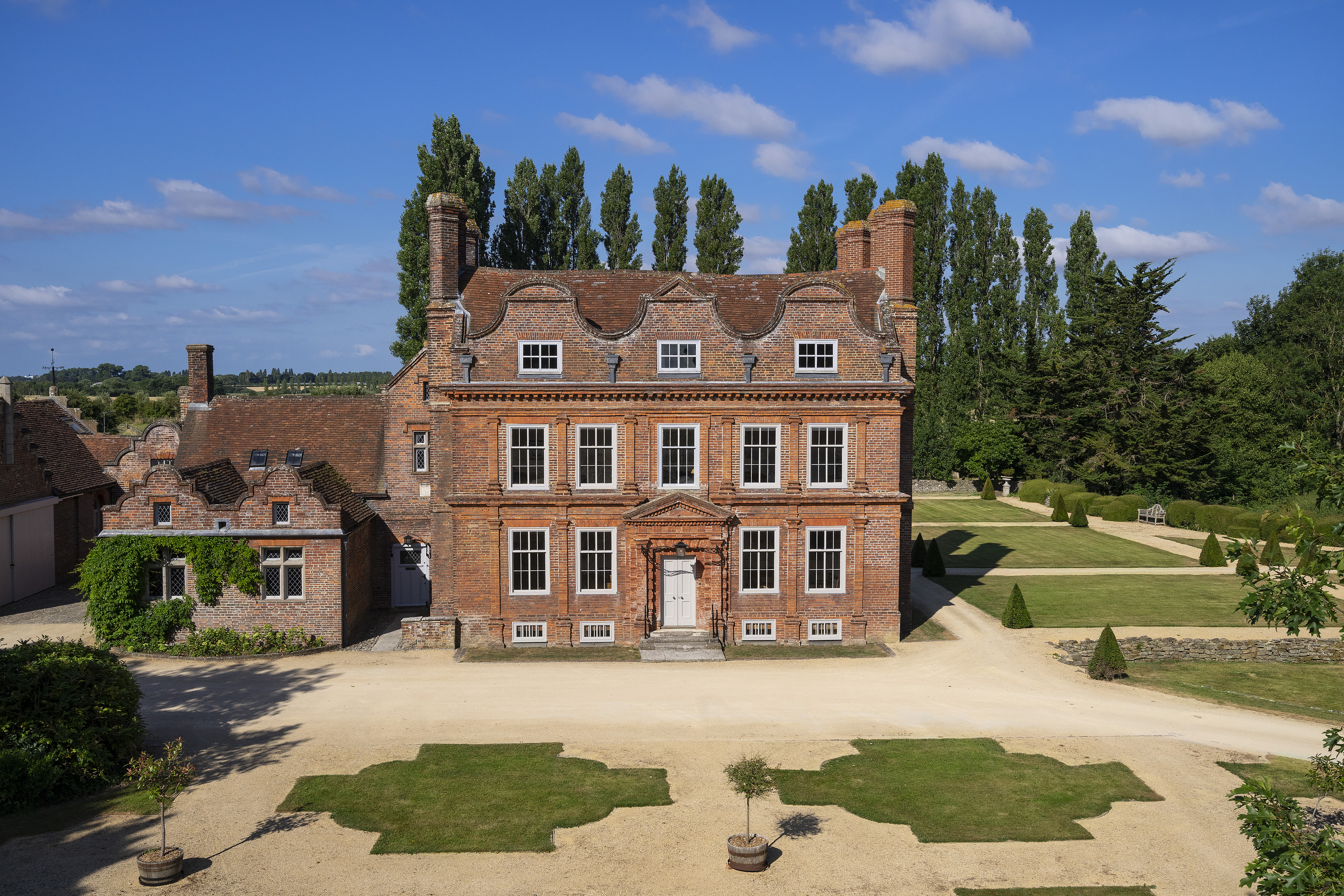
- Interactive map of the Barnham Court area

General information
- Status: Completed
- Type: House
- Architectural style: Artisan Mannerism
- Classification: Grade I
- Location: Barnham, West Sussex, England., United Kingdom
- Coordinates: 50°49′26″N 00°38′40″W
- Construction started: 17th century

Barnham Court is a 17th-century Artisan Mannerism house in Barnham, West Sussex, England. It is a Grade I listed building, and has many features similar to Kew Palace in London.

== History ==
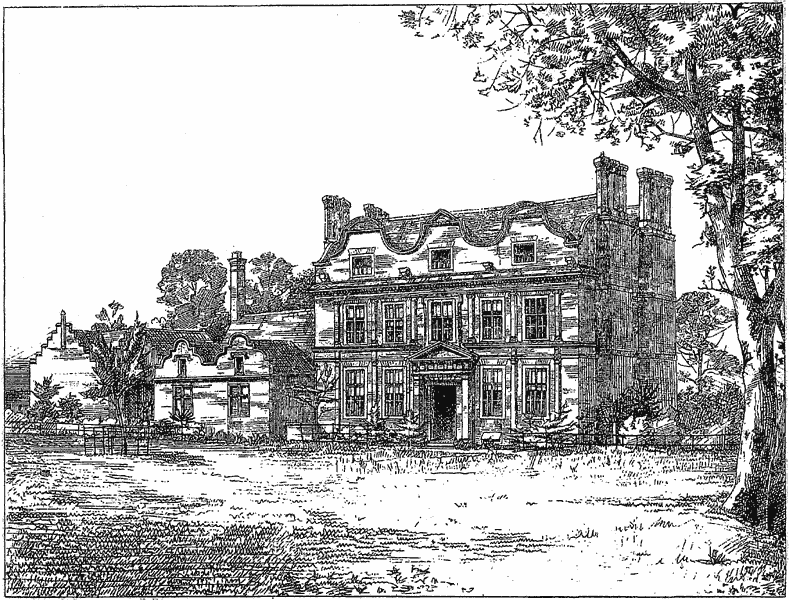
Barnham Court in 1876

Barnham Court was built in the mid-17th century, possibly for a rich merchant. The house now contains five bedrooms, and is situated on the east side of Barnham near to the parish church. It is possibly on the site of a 13th-century manor house, and is one of only a few pre-19th century buildings in the area.

The building was predominantly used as a farmhouse. It has been owned by Thomas Musgrave, John Page, and George Thomas. In the 19th century, the house was renovated, and the adjoining servant's quarters were expanded. The grounds contained a barn believed to be from the 16th century, until it was demolished in the 1960s. The grounds of Barnham Court contain an orchard and a warren. In the 19th century, the grounds contained a formal garden.

In 1958, Barnham Court became a Grade I listed building. In 1984, a lodge in the grounds of Barnham Court became a Grade II listed building. In 1996 the house was bought by owners who extensively restored Barnham Court, its grounds, formal gardens and parterres to its present state. In 2020, Barnham Court was put up for sale for £4 million.

== Architecture ==
Barnham Court was built in the Artisan Mannerism style. The three-story house is constructed of red brick, and contains two Doric pilasters, as well as ionic pilasters. The attic has three Dutch gables, each with a window.

Barnham Court was built in a similar style to Ford Palace and Albourne Palace in West Sussex, Kew Palace in London, and Broome Park in Kent. It is thought that the bricklayer for Barnham Court may have been the same as at Kew Palace, and the Dutch gables at Barnham Court also resemble those at Kew Palace. The staircase was built to one side of the building, and spiralling towards the windows to increase the natural light.
