= Poling Preceptory =

Grade I listed building in Poling, West Sussex, United Kingdom

Coordinates: 50.840944°N 0.514432°W

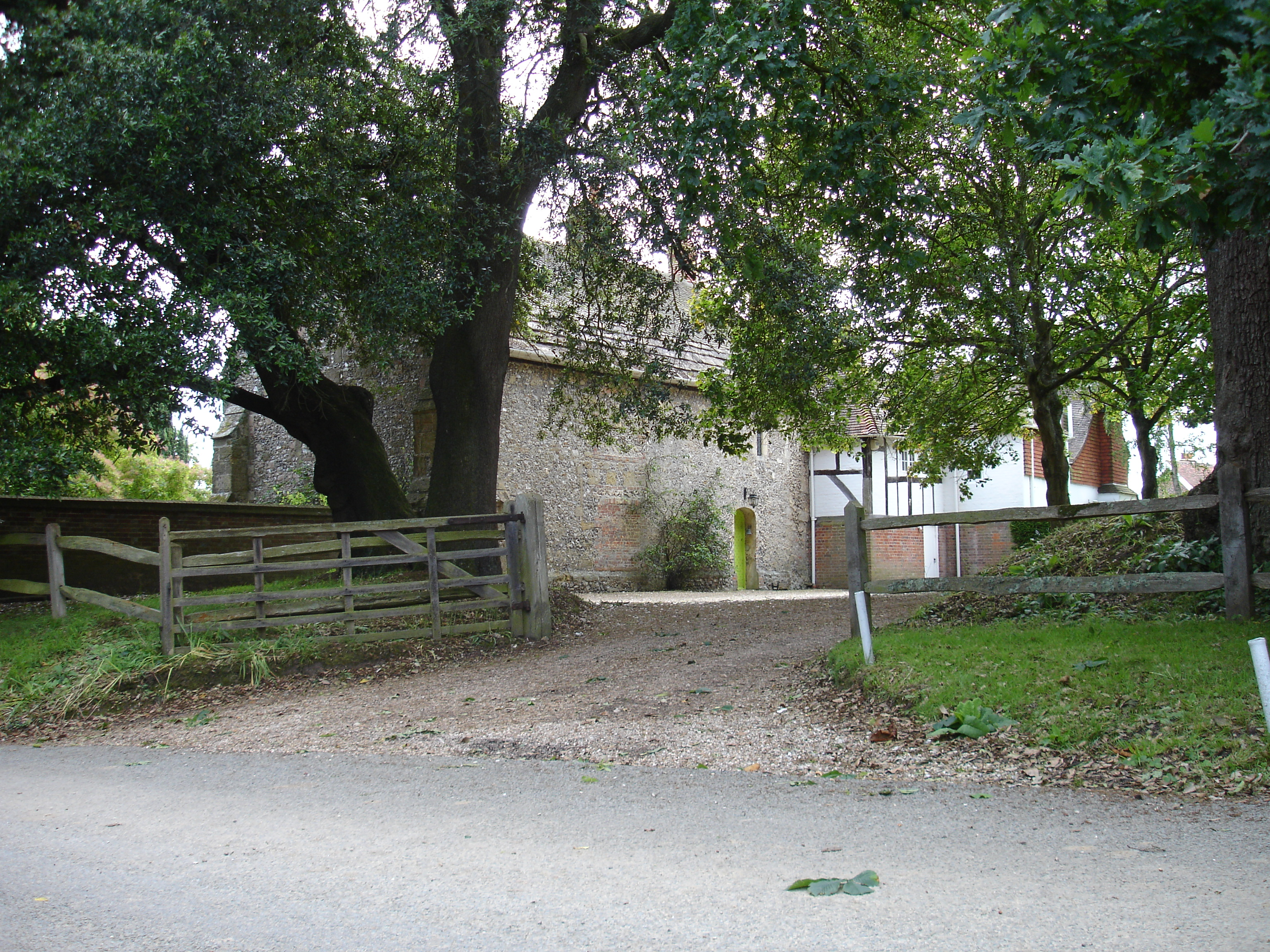
Poling Preceptory

Poling Preceptory was a priory in West Sussex, England. It is a Grade I listed building..
