= Rudgwick =

Village and parish in West Sussex, England

Coordinates: 51°05′35″N 0°26′46″W

- Village and civil parish
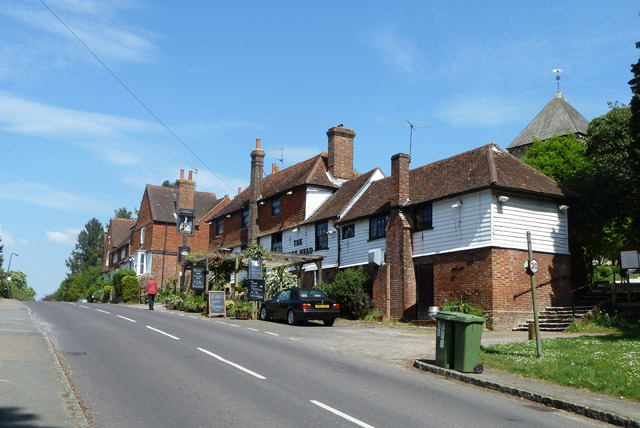
- The King's Head pub and Holy Trinity church

- Location within West Sussex
- Area: 24.69 km^{2} (9.53 sq mi)
- Population: 2,791 (2001 census); 2,722 (2011 Census)
  - Density: 113/km^{2} (290/sq mi)
- OS grid reference: TQ0833
  - London: 32 miles (51 km) NNE
- Civil parish: Rudgwick
- District: Horsham
- Shire county: West Sussex
- Region: South East
- Country: England
- Sovereign state: United Kingdom
- Post town: Horsham
- Postcode district: RH12
- Dialling code: 01403
- Police: Sussex
- Fire: West Sussex
- Ambulance: South East Coast
- UK Parliament: Horsham
- Website: Rudgwick.net

Rudgwick is a village and civil parish in the Horsham District of West Sussex, England. The village is 6 miles (10 km) west from Horsham on the north side of the A281 road. The parish's northern boundary forms part of the county boundary between Surrey and West Sussex.

The parish covers 6,394 acres (2,588 ha). The 2001 Census recorded 2,791 people living in 1,013 households, of whom 1,425 were economically active.. The 2011 Census recorded a population, including Tisman's Common of 2,722.

== History ==
Historically Ridgewick was an alternative form of the toponym. Riccherwyk may be another, seen in 1377.

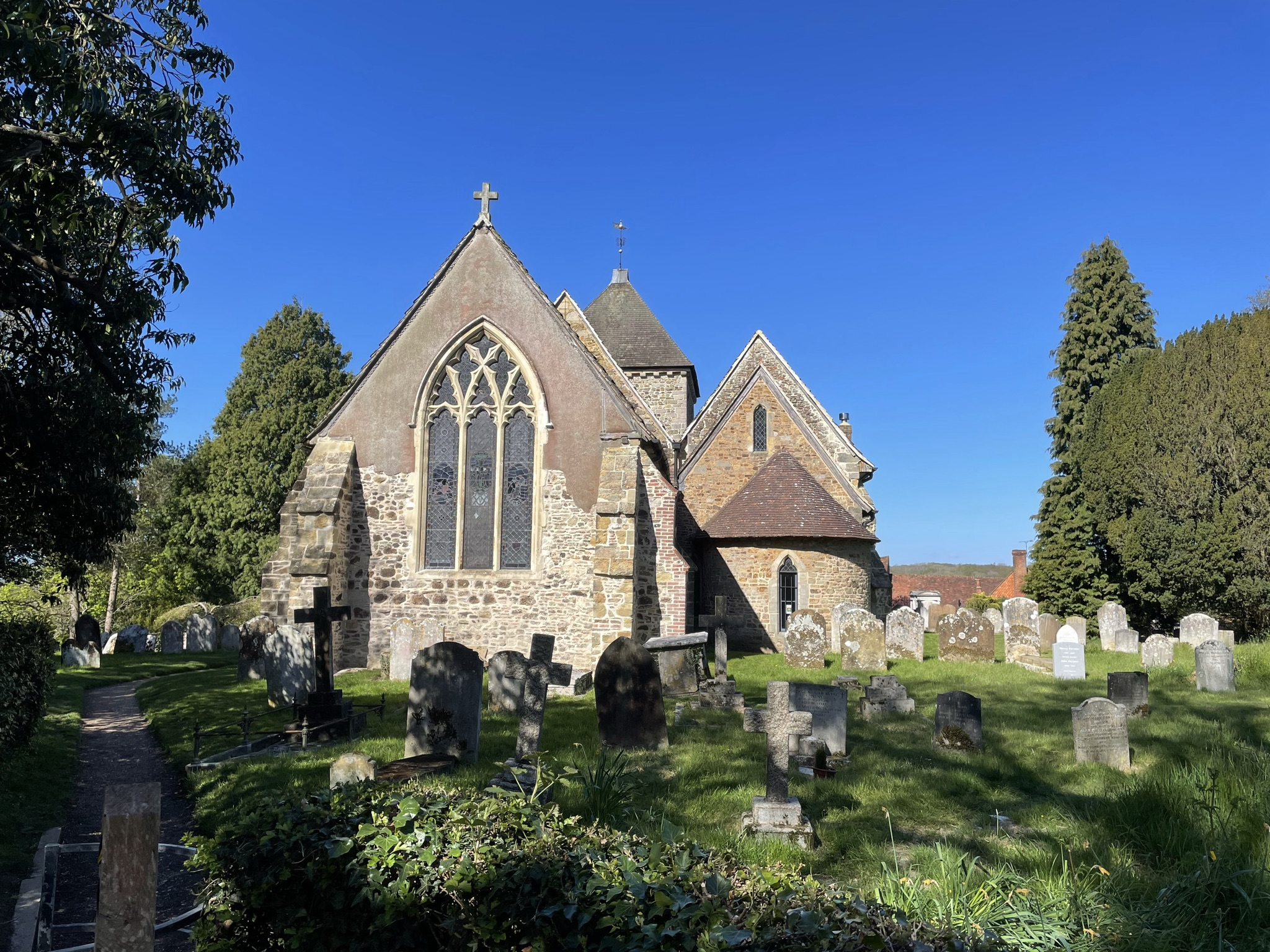
Holy Trinity Church from the west

The Church of England parish church of the Holy Trinity has a 12th-century Norman font of Sussex Marble. The belltower is early 13th century. The church was largely rebuilt in the 14th century, when the north aisle was added and probably the present chancel was built. The church is a Grade I listed building.

The parish has two 17th-century farmhouses. Garlands, 1.5 miles (2.4 km) south of the village, is early 17th century and is Grade II* listed, and Redhouse Farm, which is Grade II listed; 1 mile (1.6 km) north of the village is late 17th century. Naldrett House, 1 mile (1.6 km) south of the village, is an 18th-century Georgian farmhouse of three bays and two storeys, built of brick with stone quoins. It is Grade II listed.

Rudgwick had a Dissenters' chapel by 1848.

During World War 2, two RAF B-25s collided in the air over Rudgwick, resulting in the deaths of 8 airmen. The crash sites, now in the grounds of Rikkyo School, were excavated in the 1990s.

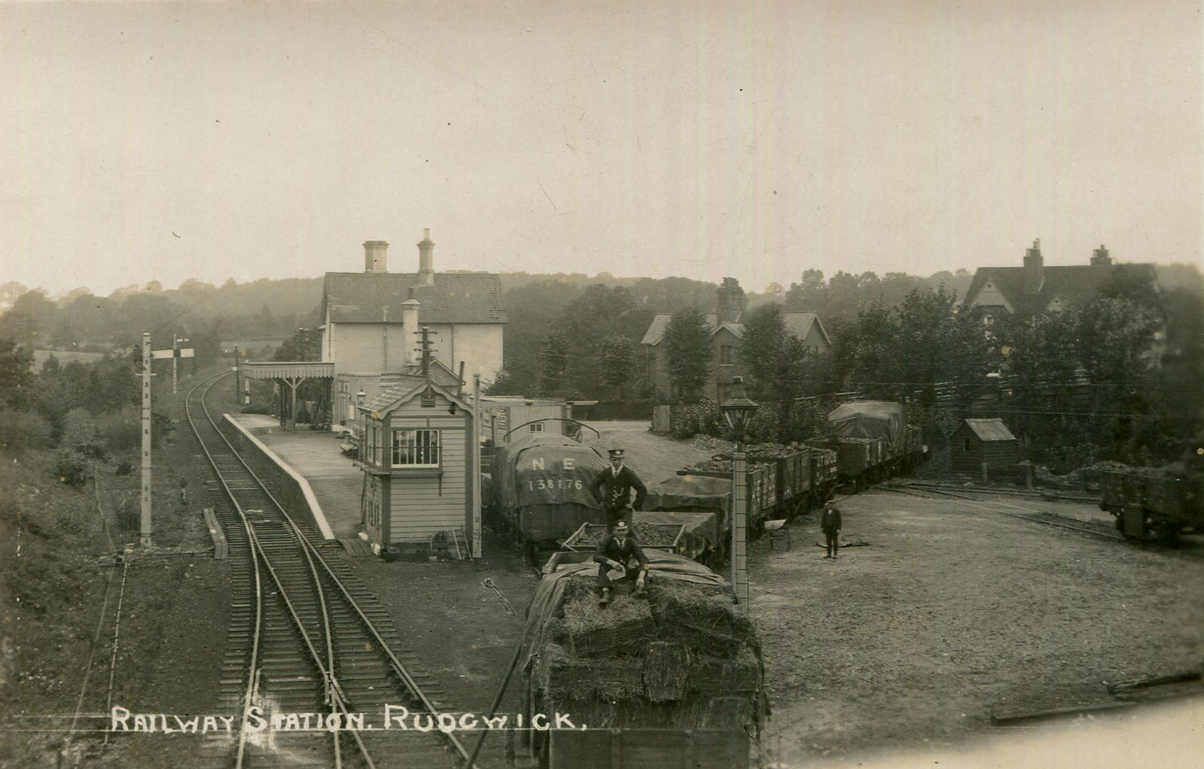
Rudgwick station (1905)

Rudgwick railway station on the Cranleigh Line was opened in 1865 and closed in 1965, as part of the Beeching cuts.

In 1985, excavations in Rudgwick Brick Yard resulted in the discovery of a new species of the Polacanthus genus, which became known as the Rudgwickosaurus.

== Education ==
Pennthorpe School is on in Church Street. Rudgwick Primary School is located in the village, as is Rikkyo School in England, a Japanese boarding school.

== Notable people ==
- Bertram Prance (1889-1958), artist and illustrator, lived in the village.
- Eric Thompson (1929–1982), creator of The Magic Roundabout grew up in Rudgwick.
- Margaret Peterson (1883 – 1933), an English novelist, died in the village

== Sources ==
- Lewis, Samuel, ed. (1931) [1848]. A Topographical Dictionary of England (Seventh ed.). London: Samuel Lewis. pp. 707–711.
- Nairn, Ian; Pevsner, Nikolaus (1965). Sussex. The Buildings of England. Harmondsworth: Penguin Books. pp. 314–315. ISBN 0-14-071028-0.
