= The Palace, Chichester =

Grade I listed building in Chichester, United Kingdom

Coordinates: 50°50′10″N 0°46′55″W

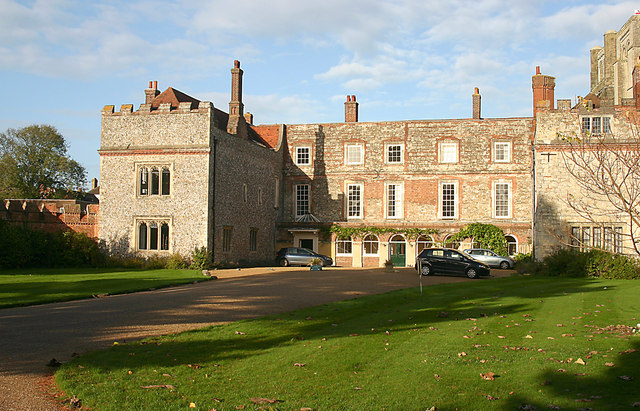
Bishop's Palace

The Palace, Chichester is the episcopal palace of the Church of England’s Diocese of Chichester, located in Chichester itself, at the west end of the Cathedral close, known as Canon Lane. It is both a residency and offices.

== History, alterations and architecture ==
The Palace is Grade I listed as of 1950. Due to the amount of works done to The Palace over many centuries, it is difficult to know the exact original date. Construction started again in the 12th century under Bishop Seffrid II, following the fire of 1187 which destroyed the town and Chichester Cathedral, as shown on the walls of the Great Kitchen and in the entirety of the Chapel. Reconstruction of the Chapel took place in the 14th century under the work of Bishop John Langton. Other than this, the Chapel has remained unchanged for over 800 years. Bishop Robert Sherborne undertook major construction projects at the Palace, including the remodelling of the south-west and south-east wings. Bishop Sherborne also had a wing built to the north of the west end. Bishop Edward Waddington restored the Palace from a supposedly ruinous condition in 1727. Bishop John Buckner also restored and altered the building in 1800.

== Occupants ==
Principally, The Palace is the residence of the Bishop of Chichester, currently The Right Reverend Dr Martin Warner. His office and staff are also based here.

== Rooms ==
The Chapel - The east window of the chapel dates from the 14th century. In the window are a number of medallions and panels of the arms of previous bishops. Within the jambs are carved stiff-leaf foliage. The walling is of Quarr Abbey stone as well as a little flint. There are four further ancient windows on the north wall. The two central bosses in the vaulting are also decorated with foliage. Also within the chapel is a 12th Century fresco with links to Saint Richard of Chichester. Beneath the High Altar of the Chapel is a relic of Saint Richard. On occasional days each year, the Chapel is open to the public.

The Great Kitchen - This chamber, sometimes referred to as the “Bishop’s Kitchen” is no longer used for its original purpose. Contained within this room are some of the earliest features and walls of The Palace. The roof is likely to have been replaced in the 15th Century as the style of architecture is thought to be too advanced for the date of the walls. Nowadays, as one of the largest complex of rooms in The Palace, it is used for hosting receptions and functions, as well as housing temporary displays of art and crafts. The Prebendal School also use part of the wing in which The Great Kitchen is for education purposes.

The Tudor Room - Sometimes known as “The Sherborne Room”, in honour of Bishop Sherborne who built the wing of the palace in which this room lies, this is one of the most notable rooms of The Palace. The original medieval ceiling with ornate decoration is still in place. Hung on the walls are 16th-century paintings. It was once used as a dining room, as it occasionally still is. Mostly, this room is now used for large receptions, dinners and exhibitions, as well as diocesan meetings.

Palace Yard - This is a row of cottages that would have originally been used to house domestic staff and servants at The Palace. They form part of the Cathedral Close and are now let out as homes to members of the general public.

The rest of The Palace is made up of offices and private apartments. Certain rooms of the private apartments are used by the occupants for personal entertaining of guests.

== Gardens ==
Since 1976, The Palace Gardens have been leased to the city council and are now a public park surrounded by the Roman city walls offering views of the Palace, Cathedral and Bell Tower. Within the park is a large area used for growing fruit and vegetables which is currently managed by local charity Grow Chichester. A large portion of the gardens have been retained for the private use of the occupants of The Palace.
