= Barnham, West Sussex =

Village and parish in West Sussex, England

Coordinates: 50.83109°N 0.63824°W

Barnham
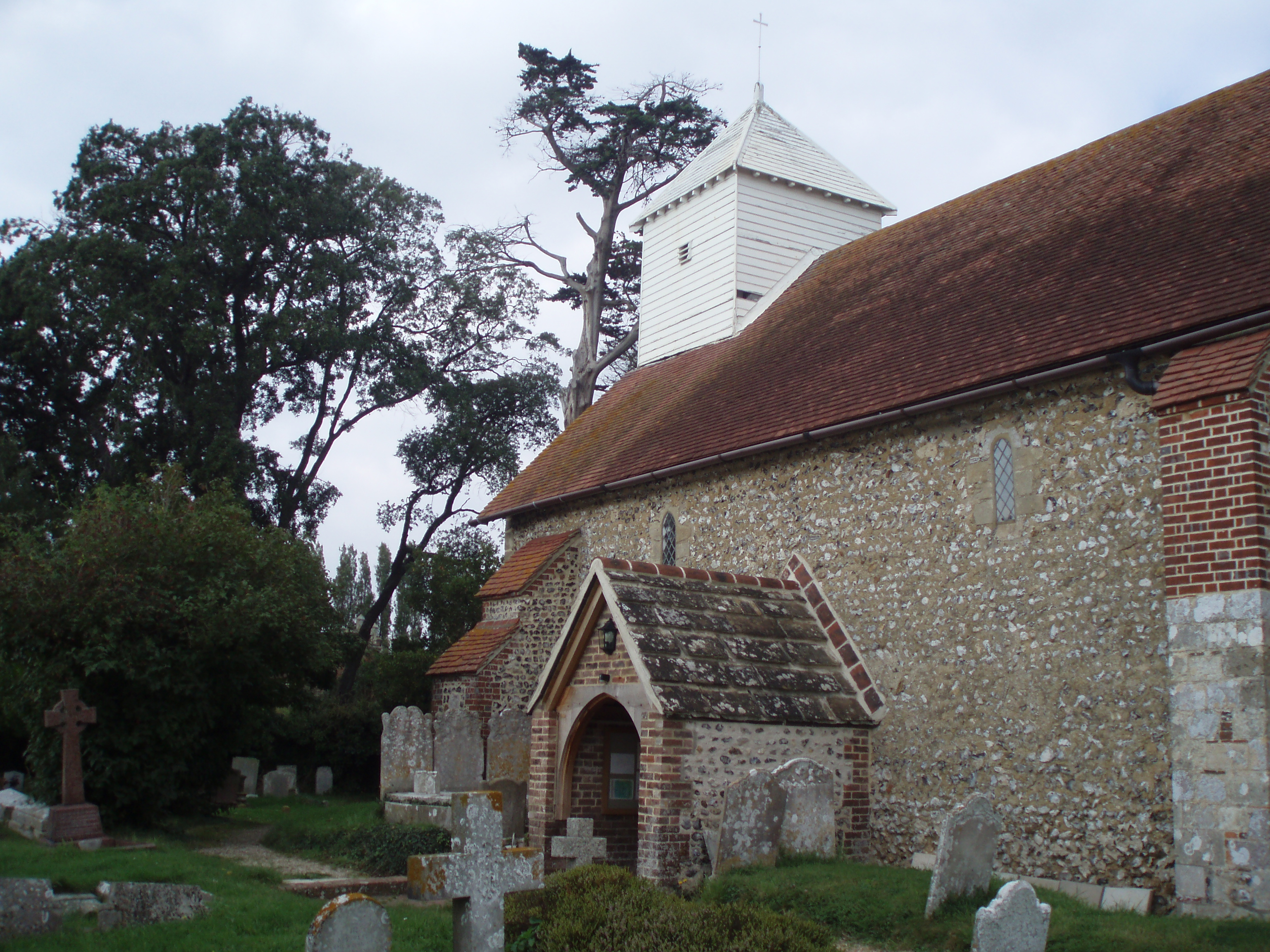
- St Mary the Virgin Church, Barnham

- Location within West Sussex
- Area: 3.73 km^{2} (1.44 sq mi)
- Population: 1,391 (Civil Parish.2011)
  - Density: 373/km^{2} (970/sq mi)
- OS grid reference: SU959044
  - London: 51 miles (82 km) NNE
- Civil parish: Barnham and Eastergate
- District: Arun
- Shire county: West Sussex
- Region: South East
- Country: England
- Sovereign state: United Kingdom
- Post town: BOGNOR REGIS
- Postcode district: PO22
- Dialling code: 01243
- Police: Sussex
- Fire: West Sussex
- Ambulance: South East Coast
- UK Parliament: Arundel and South Downs
- Website: https://barnhamandeastergate-pc.gov.uk

Barnham is a village, Anglican parish and former civil parish, now in the civil parish of Barnham and Eastergate, in the Arun district of West Sussex, England, centred about 5 miles (8.0 km) north of Bognor Regis. On 1 April 2019 the parish was merged with Eastergate to form "Barnham and Eastergate". In 2011, the parish had a population of 1,391.

== History ==
Barnham is listed in the Domesday Book of 1086 as having a mill, a church and 24 households, and woodland, plough land and meadows. It retains some of its rich agricultural history, having had very little woodland for many centuries, and gently rolling cereal fields and pasture instead.

In 1861, the ecclesiastical parish extended to 730 acres (300 ha) with a population of 125.

== Geography ==
West Barnham forms a semi-rural conurbation with Barnham (the main settlement in the former civil parish of Eastergate - see below) which had 3,107 people living in it 2001. As with many other such villages in the south-east of England just outside the Metropolitan Green Belt with accessible to centres of employment and resorts for the retired, accepted construction in the early part of the 21st century has included retirement apartments and other residential expansion.

The cattle market (founded in 1890 but now long gone) was, in its heyday, considered to be one of the most important in Sussex for both cattle and cereals.

In the 20th century this area, on alluvial soils, was important for market gardening; There are many large, industrial-sized greenhouses in the area, although very few were within the parish boundary.

== Governance ==
An electoral ward in the same name exists. This ward includes Aldingbourne and surrounding area with a total population at the 2011 census of 8,627.

== Amenities ==
The parish church, dedicated to St Mary, was given to the Abbey of Lessay in Normandy in 1105 and later passed to Boxgrove Priory. There is an elaborate carved rectangular font of Sussex marble. The white wooden tower was once regarded as an important aid to shipping in the English Channel. There are places of worship for Roman Catholics and Methodists.

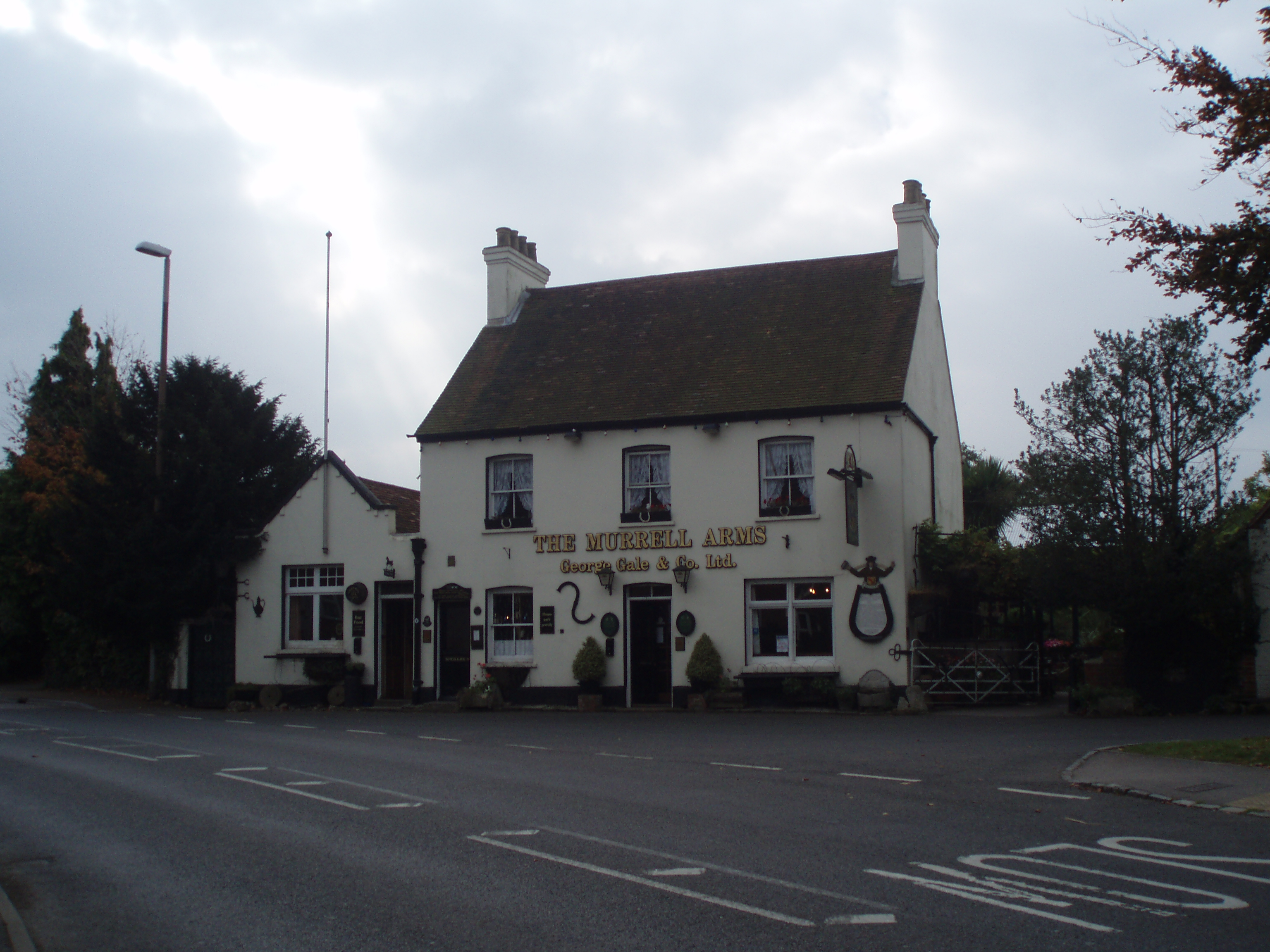
The Murrell Arms

A pub remains in Barnham, the Murrell Arms - originally a farmhouse, built in 1750, and licensed since 1866.

Another public house served the village from the early 20th century until 2010: The Barnham Bridge Inn which closed when the brewery was taken into administration. In July 2014, work commenced to turn the premises into a supermarket.

Barnham Windmill is on the South-Eastern boundary of the village on the road to Yapton. The present windmill was built in 1829 and has undergone start-and-stop restoration for over a decade, although there seems to have been little work done since 2007. The windmill used to be accessible through the adjacent tea rooms, but when the tea rooms closed in 2005, so did access to the mill. In August 2009, work began to turn the tea rooms and adjacent property into five dwellings, with the provisional development plans stating that the windmill would be turned into a '4/5 bedroom house'.

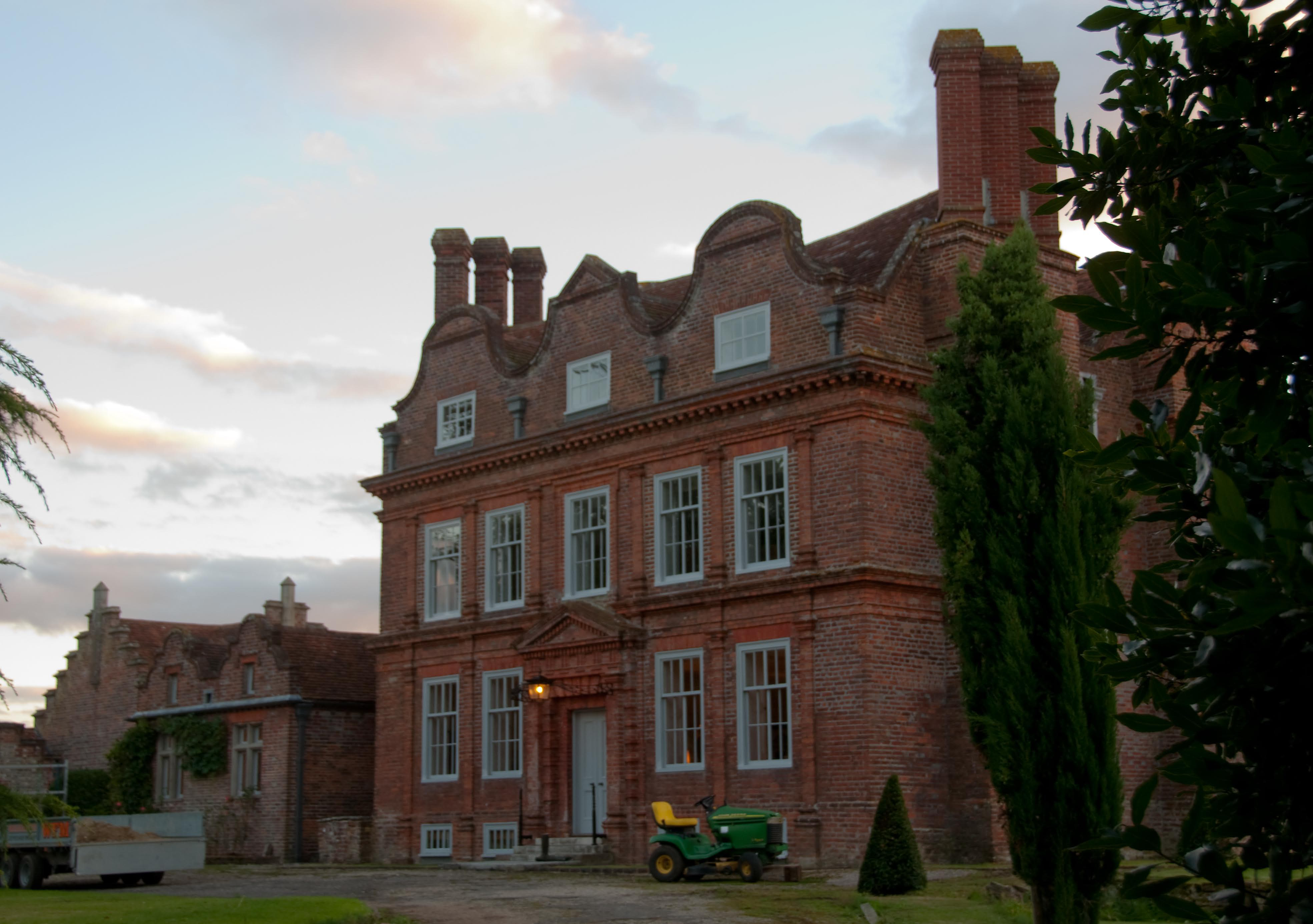
Barnham Court

Part of the Portsmouth-Arundel Canal (opened in 1823 but now disused and filled in) is visible to the SE of the village, including remains of the locks and pivots used for the locking mechanisms.

== History ==
St Mary's Church represents the heart of 'Old Barnham', but when the railway station and junction for Bognor Regis were built approximately one mile north of the church, the focus of the village shifted as businesses built premises adjacent to the station and this was followed by housing developments centred on this location.
