= St Botolph's Church, Botolphs =

St Botolph's Church
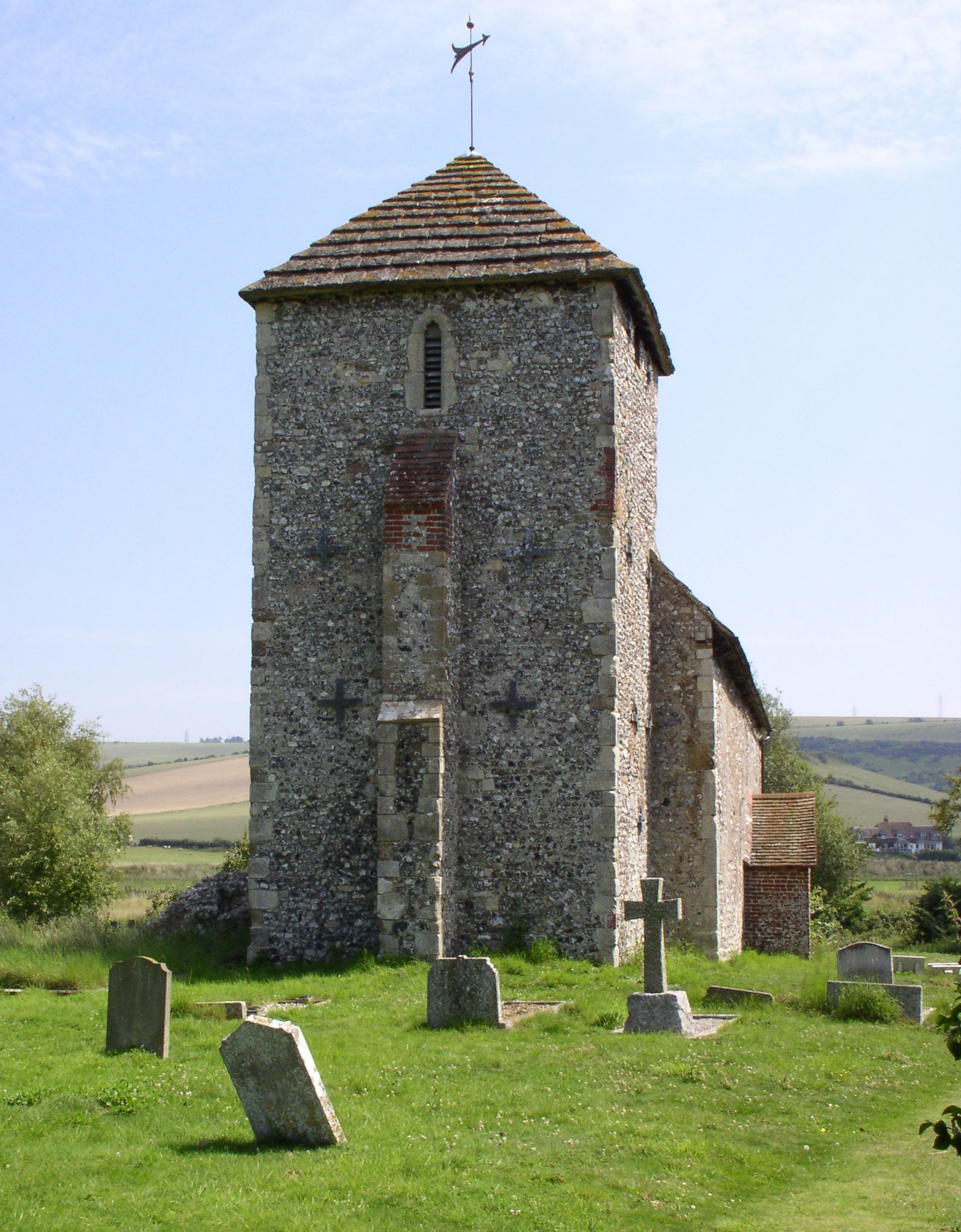
- St Botolph's Church from the west
- St Botolph's Church
- 50.8704689°N 0.3050819°W
- Location: Annington Rd, Botolphs, West Sussex, BN44 3WB
- Country: England
- Denomination: Church of England

History
- Former name: Church of St Peter de Vetere Ponte
- Status: Parish church
- Founded: Late 11th century
- Dedication: St Botolph

Architecture
- Functional status: Active
- Heritage designation: Grade I
- Designated: 15 March 1955
- Style: Saxon/Norman
- Groundbreaking: Late 11th century

Administration
- Province: Canterbury
- Diocese: Chichester
- Archdeaconry: Horsham
- Deanery: Rural Deanery of Storrington
- Parish: Beeding and Bramber with Botolphs

The Grade I listed Saxon church of St Botolph at Botolphs, West Sussex, England, is situated in the valley of the River Adur and is now part of the Church of England parish of Beeding and Bramber with Botolphs. An earlier dedication to St Peter de Vetere Ponte (St Peter of the Old Bridge) is now lost, like the bridge over the Adur from which it took this ancient name. The church serves the mostly depopulated hamlet of Botolphs in the Horsham district of West Sussex. The church has fragments of medieval wall paintings. Architectural historian Ian Nairn comments that the Jacobean pulpit is "notable in a county which is poor in 17th century fittings".

== History ==
The parish of Botolphs came into existence in the Saxon era as one of several long, narrow divisions of land on the southern slopes of the South Downs near the River Adur, which reached the English Channel at the port of Shoreham. Like neighbouring Beeding and Bramber, Botolphs' territory stretched for about 2 miles (3.2 km) from west to east. At the time of the Domesday survey in 1086, the manor of Hanyngedune was known; it was first named in 956, when King Eadwig gave it away, and the area it covered was identical to the later parish of Botolphs.

The lie of the land meant that two settlements developed separately in the parish: there were two areas of high ground rising from a flood-prone alluvial plain. Some flint cottages were built around Annington manor house and its farm, and a few others were clustered around the church. The latter settlement was known as Old Bridge before acquiring the name Botolphs, and both the name and archaeological evidence (in the form of Roman-era masonry found in the fields) suggest that the church was built near the site of the now vanished bridge over the river.

The Domesday survey mentioned a church at Annington as well as the manor house, and architectural evidence suggests that St Botolph's Church is of Saxon origin—confirming that only one church served the parish, rather than each settlement having its own place of worship as was once believed. The dedication to St Botolph is thought to be original; but around the time of the Norman conquest the church was officially rededicated to St Peter de Vetere Ponte (meaning St Peter of the Old Bridge). In 1254, the dedication to St Botolph reappeared in print, and the two names were used interchangeably for a period as use of the old name was maintained by locals. By the 15th century, the newer dedication to St Peter fell out of use. Another historic dedication, to St Mary, has also been suggested. The existence of another St Peter's Church at nearby Beeding has been suggested as a reason for the dedication reverting to St Botolph.

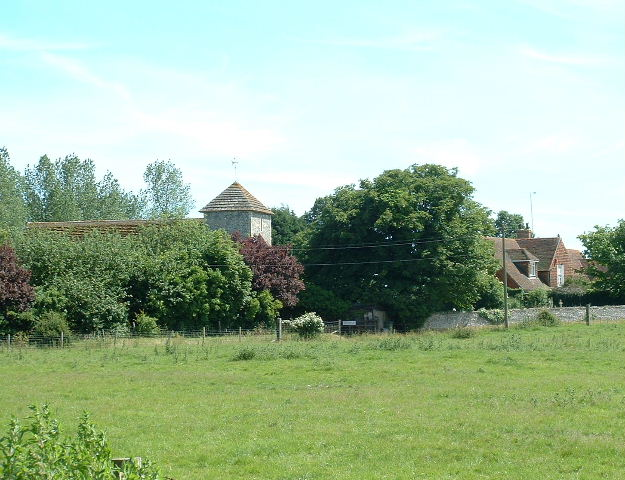
An old vicarage stands next to the church.

The river Adur was originally navigable as far as Bramber; but the sea began to recede in about 1350, and the river silted up, after which the bridge at Botolphs fell into disuse and the village population declined. The crossing point had apparently been in use for about 1,000 years (as suggested by the Roman rubble found nearby), and when it was lost the village could no longer thrive. In 1526 Botolphs was incorporated into Bramber parish. Structurally, the church expanded and contracted over the centuries in line with the changing population. In its original form, it was an aisleless building with nave and chancel. In the 13th century, a tower was added; and in about 1250 an aisle was added to the north side, separated from the nave by an arcade of three bays. The chancel was altered and new windows were inserted in the 14th century. The tower was equipped with a peal of three bells in 1536. The aisle, which apparently housed a shrine to St Botolph, St Peter and Mary, became dilapidated by the late 18th century as the population fell; it had been demolished by 1830, leaving the three blank arches of the arcade on the north wall.

A timber-framed vicarage existed by 1615. It may date from the 14th century, and the building still stands next to the church—albeit with structural alteration. It was listed at Grade II on 9 May 1980.

== Architecture, fittings and setting ==
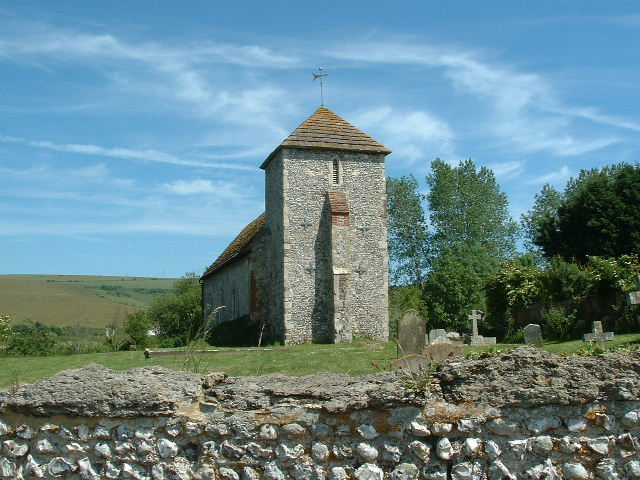
The church, with a prominently buttressed tower, stands in an isolated downland setting.

St Botolph's Church is in "a peaceful spot" next to the River Adur, although the former Beeding Cement Works and the Shoreham–Horsham railway line were both a short distance away on the other side of the river (both have ceased operating). Writing in 1932, one historian noted that interest in the church and its similarly isolated neighbour at Coombes had been reinvigorated by the building of a new road along the river between Steyning and the coast, which encouraged visitors to come to the "little lost Down[land] churches". The church was less well regarded in the Victorian era: one 19th-century writer dismissed it as "small and uninteresting". Ian Nairn considered it "simple and mellow", while others have praised the "clean lines [and] perfect setting" of the "small, attractive church".

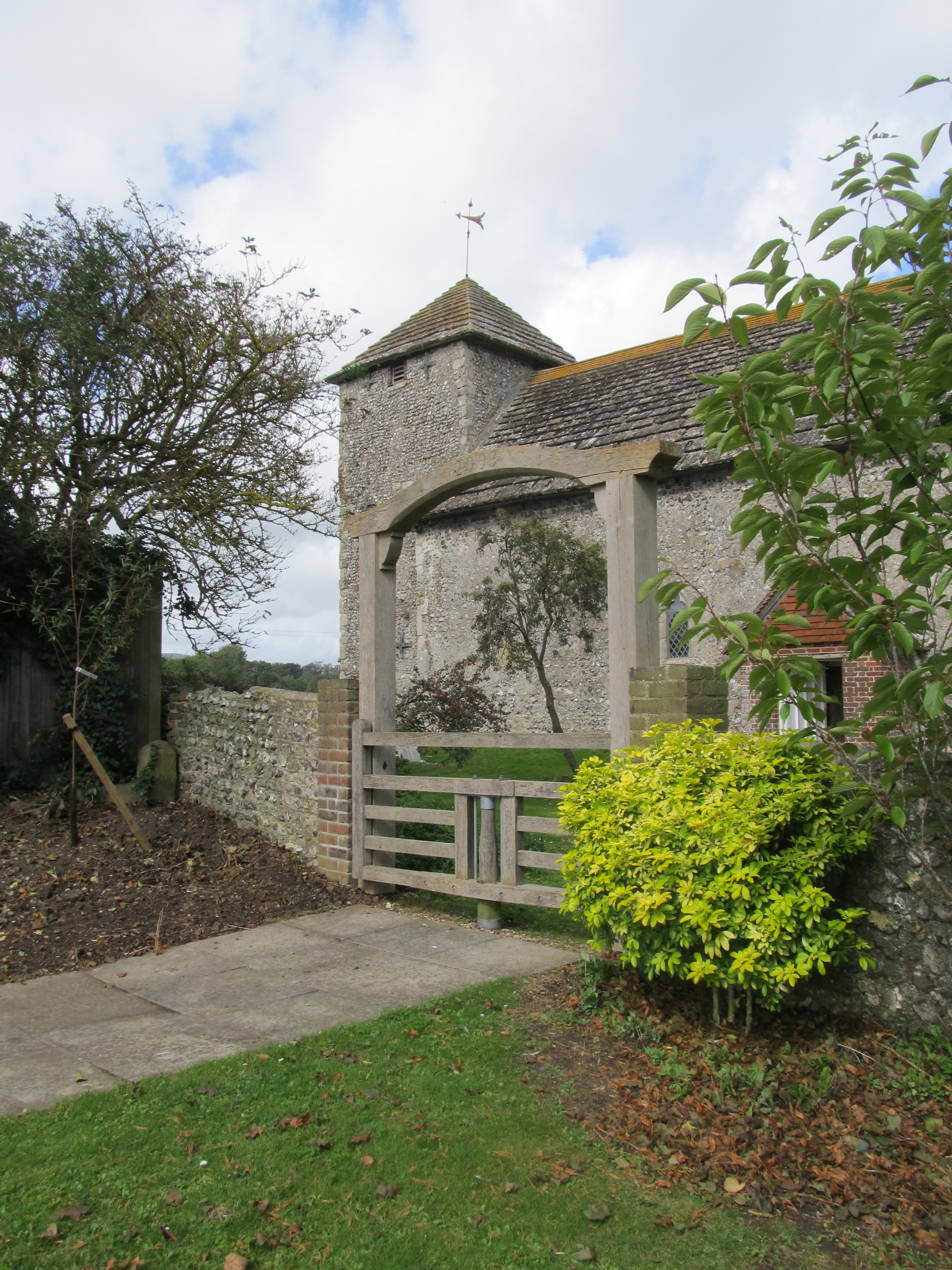
The church has a modern Tapsel gate.

The nave and chancel are Saxon, but their date is unknown. The nave has long and narrow Saxon proportions of about 55 feet 6 inches (16.92 m) long by 17 feet 6 inches (5.33 m) wide by the interior measure. At the west end of the south wall is an original round-headed Saxon window. The south doorway is 17th century, with a modern porch. The chancel is about 16 feet (4.9 m) long and 10 feet (3.0 m) wide on the interior. The chancel arch is of one order with the late Saxon feature of a soffit roll.

The three-bay north aisle added in about 1250 had a three-arched arcade. By the early 19th century the arches were filled in and the aisle was demolished—evidence of the declining population and importance of Botolphs, which had become a shrunken medieval settlement with only a few surviving houses. The remains of the pointed arches are a prominent feature of the north wall.

Traces of the wall paintings were recorded in 1897. When examined in about 1932 they were thought to be from a "Doom" scheme of painting, including depictions of St John and the Virgin Mary with a bishop. However, only a few indistinct patches are visible today.

The pulpit "almost certainly dates from 1630" and was formerly painted blue. It is covered with incised abstract patterns.

One of the three 1536 bells commemorates the old dedication to St Peter with the inscription "Sancte Petre ora pro nobis".

A modern Tapsel gate dating from 2003 links the churchyard to an adjacent civil burial ground, operated jointly by the three civil parish councils of Bramber, Upper Beeding, and Steyning. The Rector of Botolphs sits (ex officio) on the Joint Parishes Burial Board, and an annual memorial service for the council burial ground in held in the church. The tapsel gate was funded by the joint parish councils to facilitate the use of the church by visitors to the burial ground. It was officially opened and dedicated early in 2004 by the Bishop of Horsham.

== The church today ==
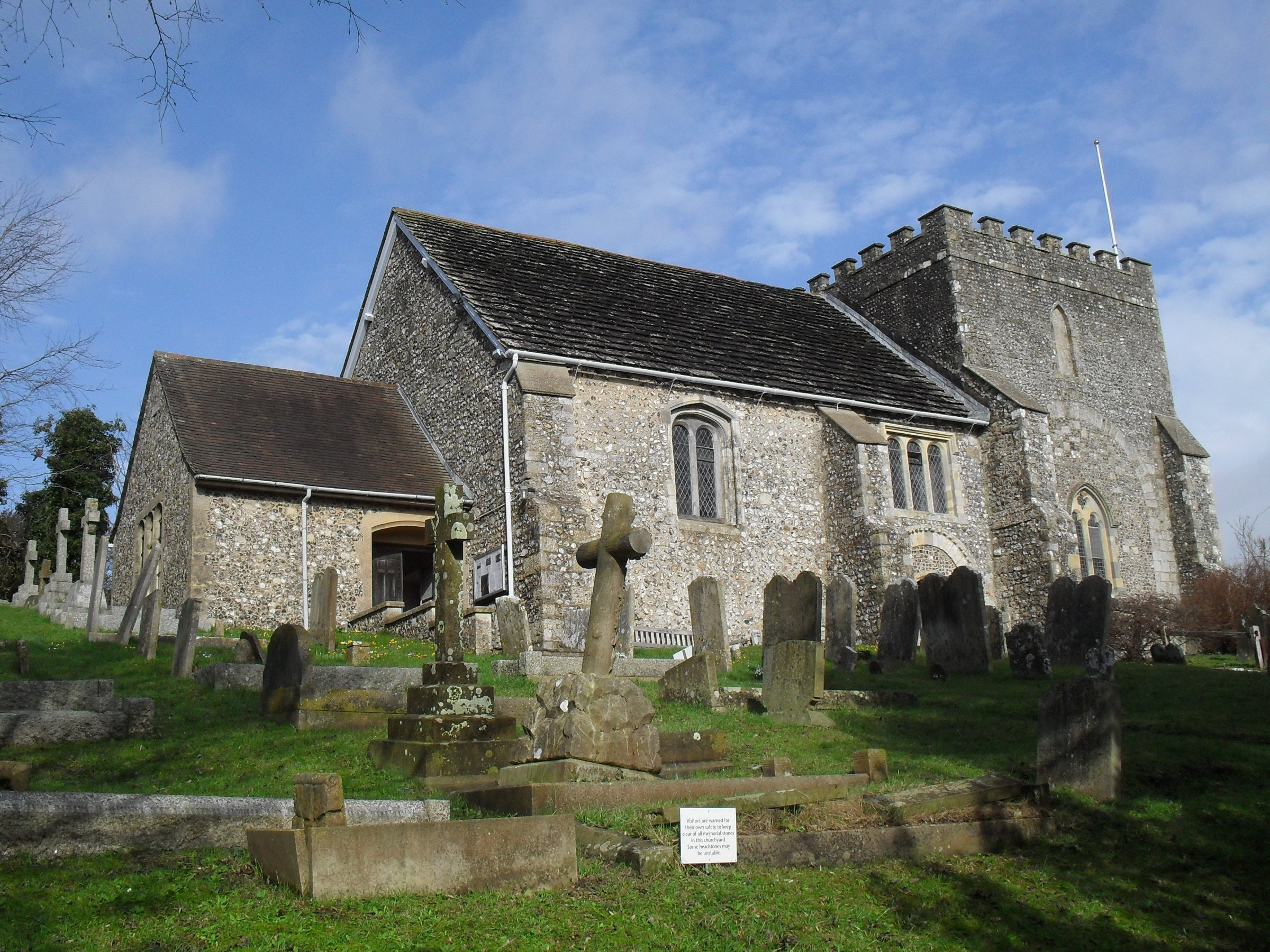
St Botolph's Church is administratively linked to St Nicholas' Church at Bramber.

The church was listed at Grade I on 15 March 1955. Such buildings are defined as being of "exceptional interest" and greater than national importance. As of February 2001, it was one of 38 Grade I listed buildings, and 1,726 listed buildings of all grades, in the district of Horsham.

The advowson (the right to appoint clergy) has been held by the Bishop of Chichester since 1953, along with that of St Nicholas' Church at Bramber with which it has been united since 1526, and St Peter's Church in Beeding with which it has been united since 1987. The three churches now form a single ecclesiastical parish, with one parochial church council. The advowson had originally been held by Sele Priory at nearby Beeding; this was linked to the Abbey Church of St Florent at Saumur in Normandy, to which the church belonged at the time of the Domesday survey. Most of the priory's holdings, including the advowson, were transferred to Magdalen College at the University of Oxford in the late 15th century, and except for a few years from 1475 this institution nominated the rector until 1953, when the right of presentation was voluntarily surrendered to the Bishop of Chichester.

Currently, one Sunday service is held monthly, on the evening of the first Sunday of each month. Other services are held at the other two churches in the parish—at Bramber and Upper Beeding. The joint parish, which serves about 5,000 people in the three villages and the surrounding rural area, was officially created in 1987 from the merger of Bramber-cum-Botolphs and Beeding parishes. Births, marriages and deaths in the parish since 1601 are recorded in the parish registers.

== Gallery ==
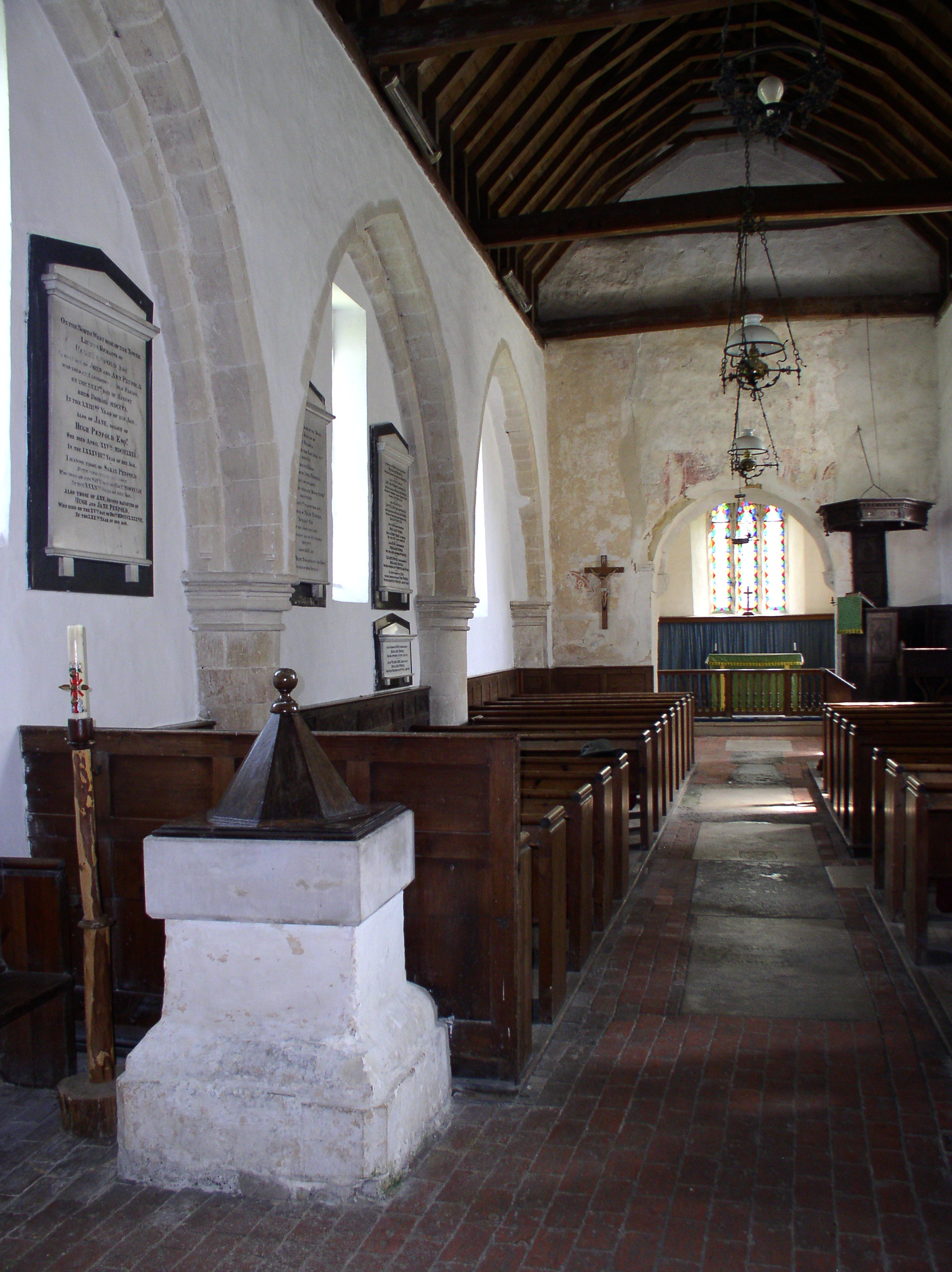
The nave showing the filled-in north arcade.

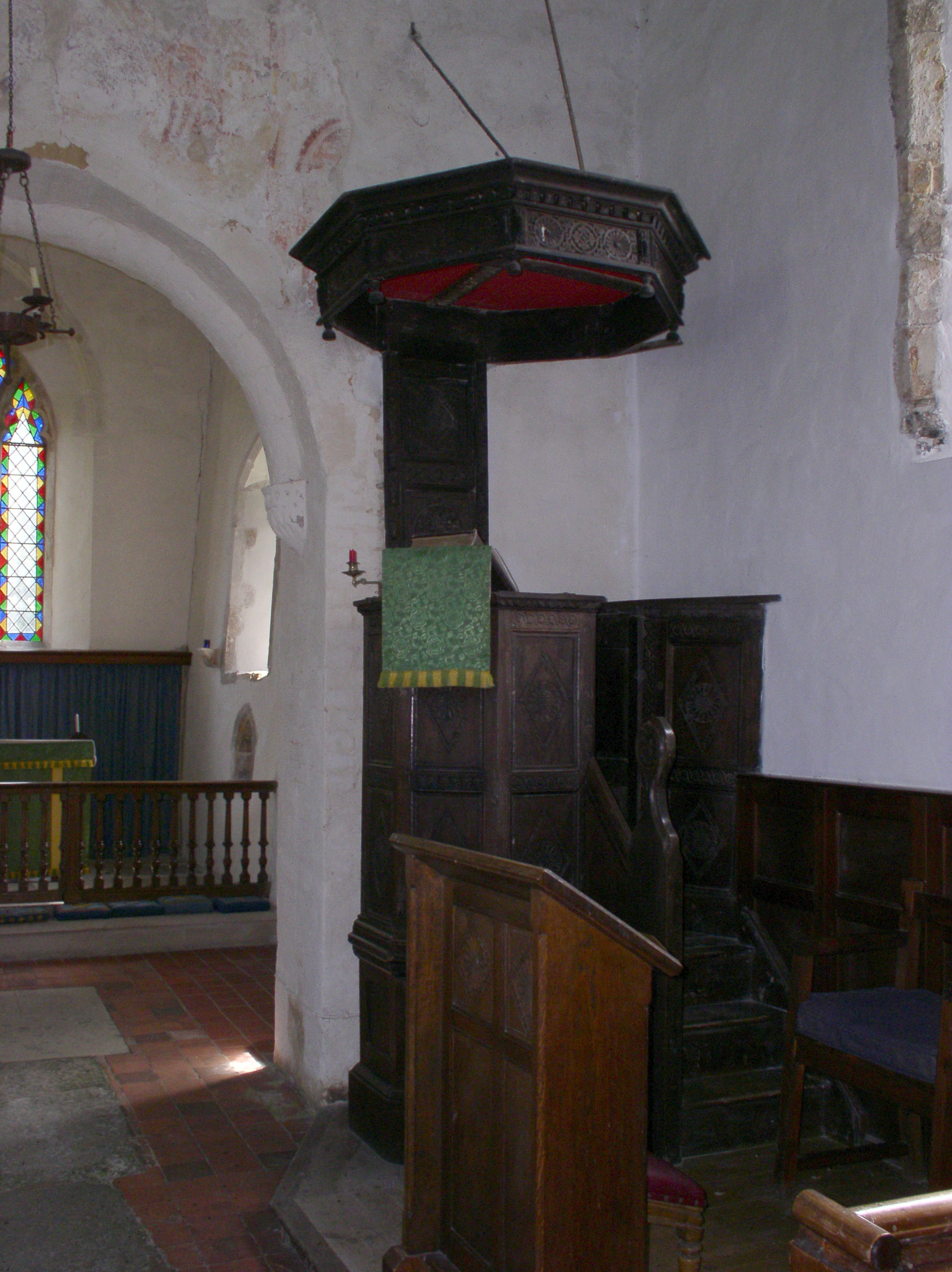
The Jacobean pulpit.

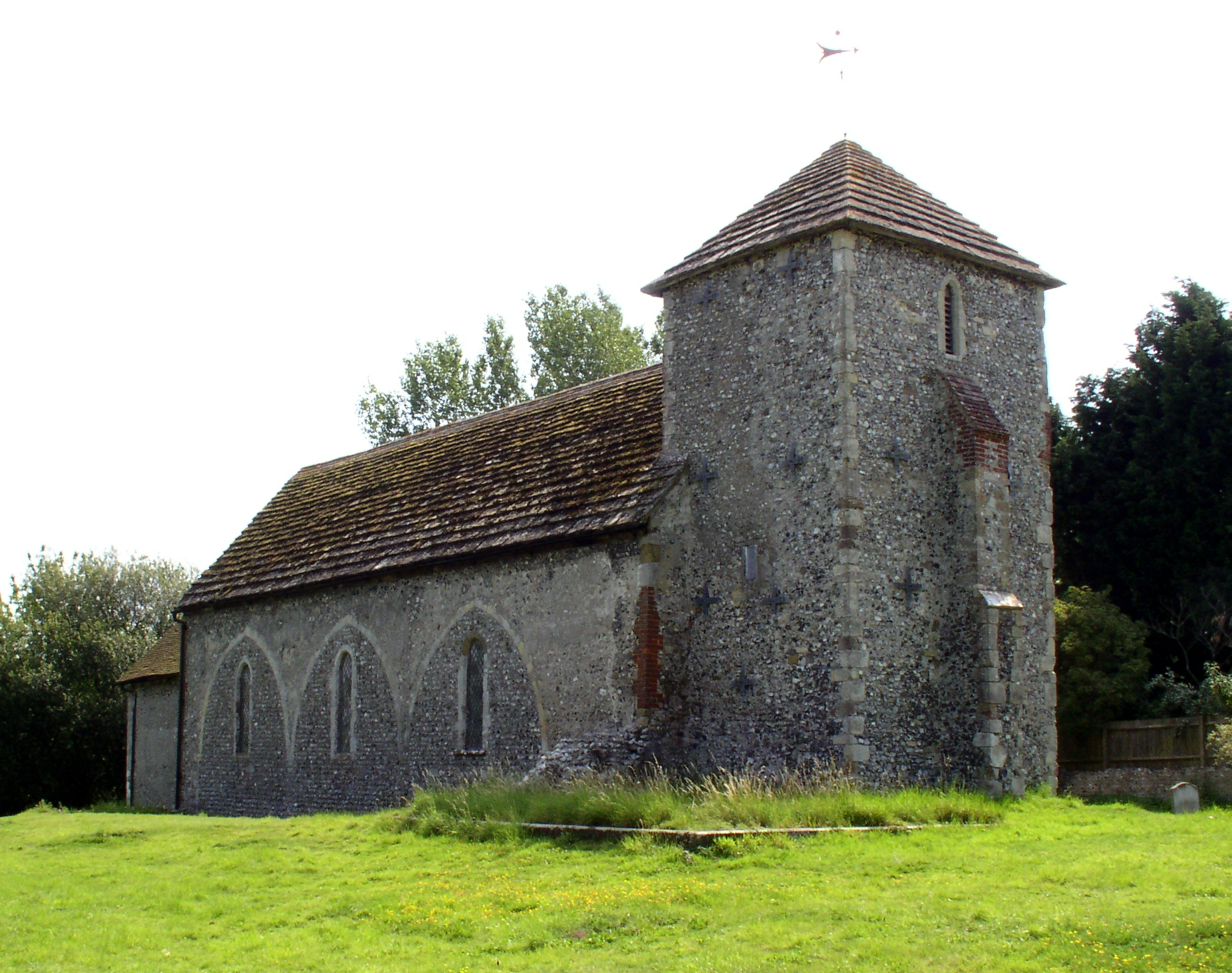
The church from the north west showing the filled-in arcade, formerly in the north aisle.

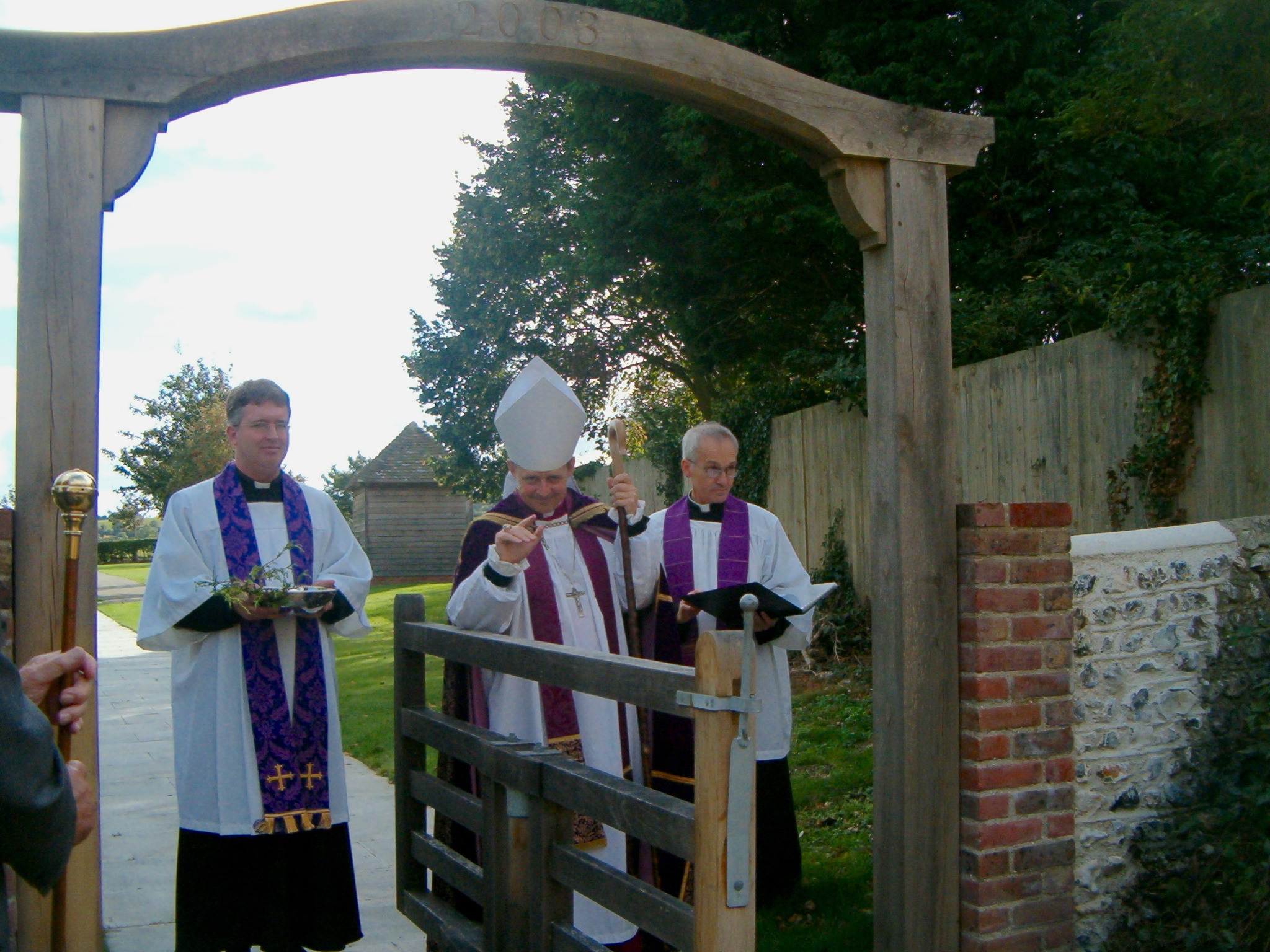
The Bishop of Horsham dedicating the tapsel gate in 2004, with the Rector and the bishop's domestic chaplain.

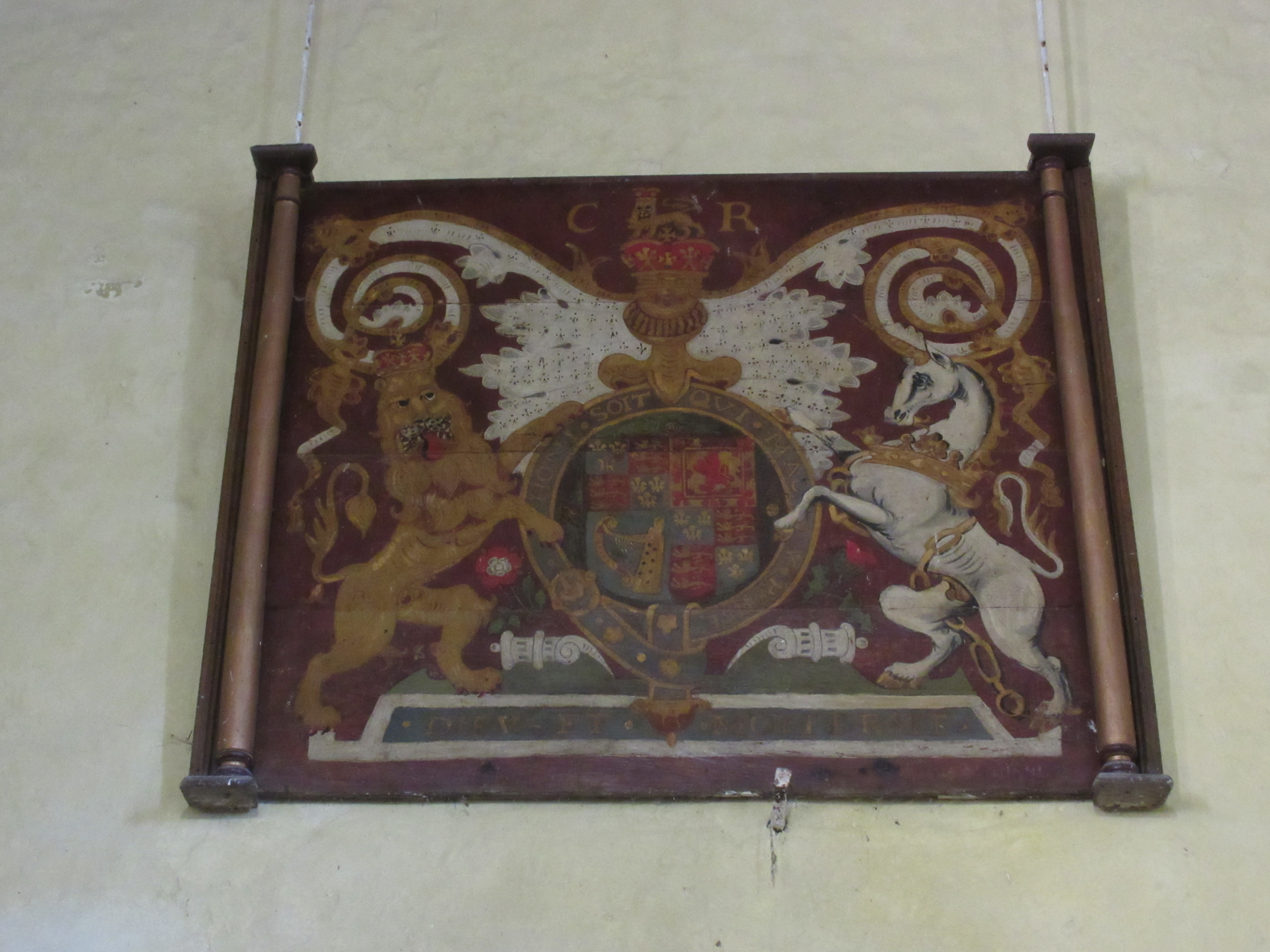
Painting of King Charles I's arms, displayed on the wall inside St Botolph's Church (opposite end from altar)

== See also ==
- Grade I listed buildings in West Sussex
- List of places of worship in Horsham (district)
- Anglo-Saxon architecture

== Bibliography ==
- Allen, John (2010), Sussex Parish Churches – Botolphs – St Botolph
- Arnold, H.E.B. (November 1932). "The Church of St Peter de Vetere Ponte on the Adur". Sussex County Magazine. 6 (11). Eastbourne: T.R. Beckett.
- Beevers, David; Marks, Richard; Roles, John (1989). Sussex Churches and Chapels. Brighton: The Royal Pavilion, Art Gallery and Museums. ISBN 0-948723-11-4.
- Coppin, Paul (2006). 101 Medieval Churches of West Sussex. Seaford: S.B. Publications. ISBN 1-85770-306-5.
- Fisher, E.A. (1970). The Saxon Churches of Sussex. Newton Abbot: David & Charles. ISBN 0-7153-4946-5.
- Hudson, T.P., ed. (1980). "Botolphs". A History of the County of Sussex: Volume 6 Part 1: Bramber Rape (Southern Part). A.P. Baggs, C.R.J. Currie, C.R. Elrington, S.M. Keeling, A.M. Rowland. Institute of Historical Research/Victoria County History.
- Nairn, Ian; Pevsner, Nikolaus (1965). The Buildings of England: Sussex. Harmondsworth: Penguin Books. ISBN 0-14-071028-0.
- Salter, Mike (2000). The Old Parish Churches of Sussex. Malvern: Folly Publications. ISBN 1-871731-40-2.
- The Church of St. Botolph. Botolphs: Parish of Beeding and Bramber with Botolphs. p. 7.
- Wales, Tony (1999). The West Sussex Village Book. Newbury: Countryside Books. ISBN 1-85306-581-1.
