= Tapsel gate =

Type of wooden gate

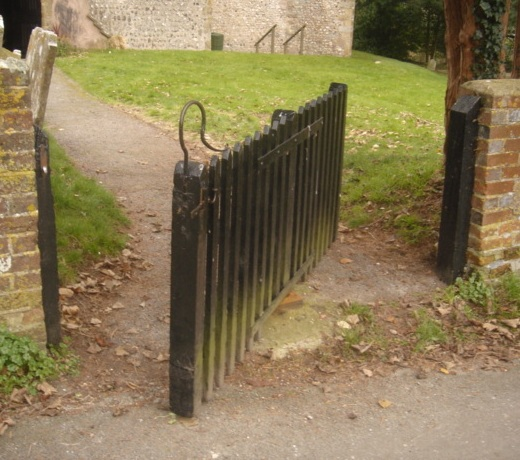
The Tapsel gate at the Church of the Transfiguration, Pyecombe, in a half-open position

A Tapsel gate is a type of wooden gate, unique to the English county of Sussex, which has a central pivot upon which it can rotate through 90° in either direction before coming to a stop at two fixed points. It was named after a Sussex family of bell founders, one of whom invented it in the late 18th century. Only six examples survive, all within a 10-mile (16 km) radius of Lewes, the county town of Sussex. (Note: The historic county of Sussex has been divided into two non-metropolitan counties, East Sussex and West Sussex. Lewes was the county town of historic Sussex and is now the county town of East Sussex.) Tapsel gates have the dual advantage of keeping cattle out of churchyards and allowing the efficient passage of coffins carried to and from the church during burials. The name sometimes is used more generally to describe swivelling gates of a similar design elsewhere.

== Origins ==
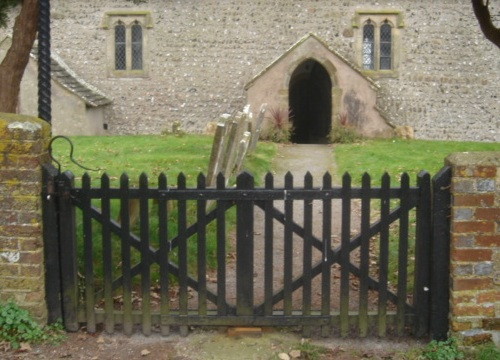
The gate at Pyecombe in its closed position

The Tapsel family first was recorded in Sussex in 1577, when the churchwardens in the parish of West Tarring paid for some church bells. The surname was recorded as "Topsayle" and many other variant spellings have been recorded subsequently: Tapsell, Tapsil, Tapsayle, Tapsaille, Topsil and Topsel. As a result, the name of the gate sometimes is spelled differently. Several generations of the family worked as bell-founders and rope-makers from a foundry in Tarring, although they travelled throughout Sussex to undertake repairs and cast new bells.

Research suggests the most likely inventor of the Tapsel gate was John Tapsel (or Tapsell), who lived in Mountfield near Battle in the early 18th century, although this is not known for certain. The first record of a Tapsel gate is in the churchwarden's accounts book from St Pancras Church at Kingston near Lewes. An accounting entry in 1729 notes that 1s. 6d. was paid by the church for the installation of a gate in its churchyard.

== Location of the gates ==
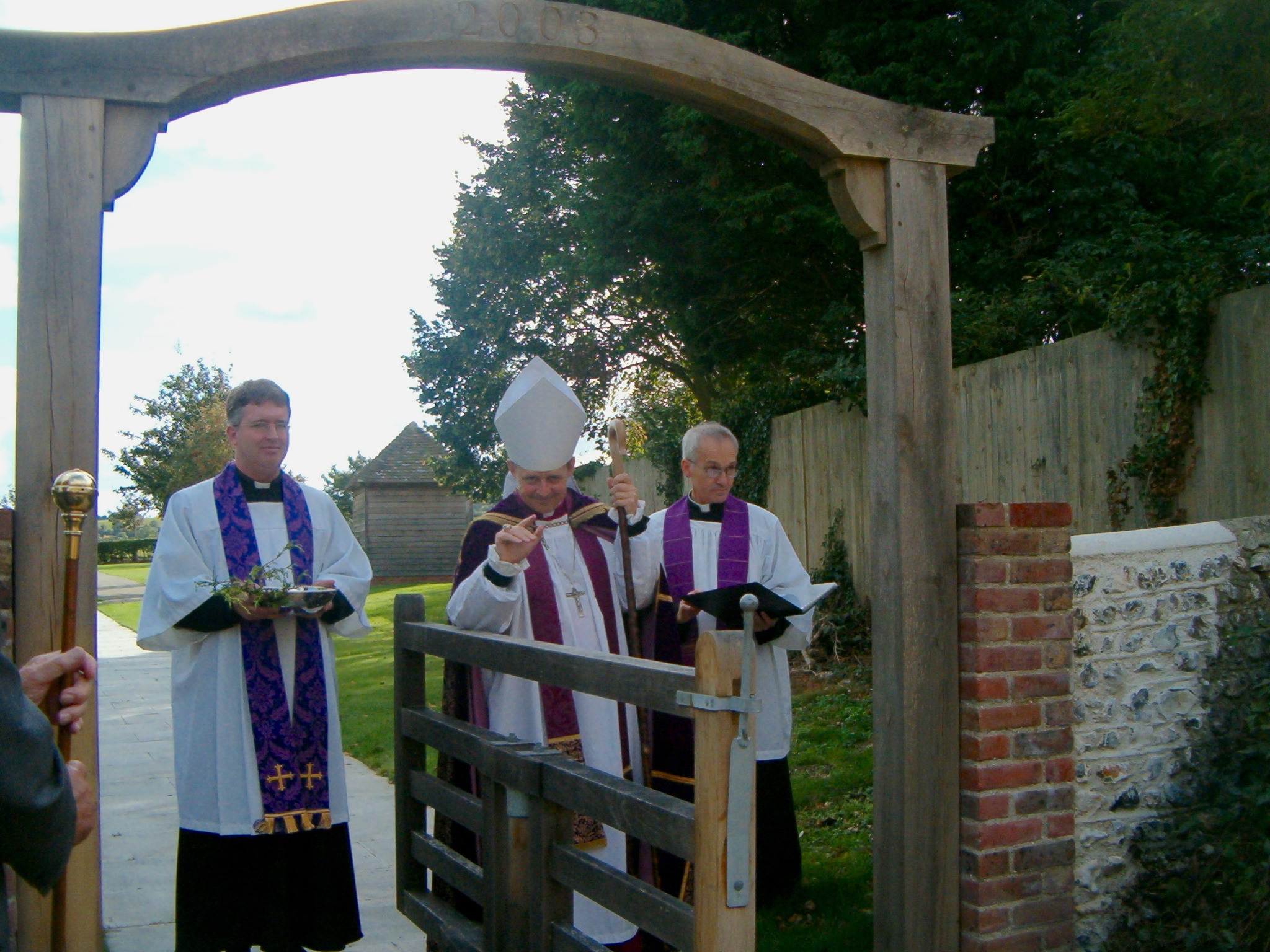
Bishop Lindsay Urwin consecrating the Tapsel gate at St Botolph's Church, Botolphs in 2004

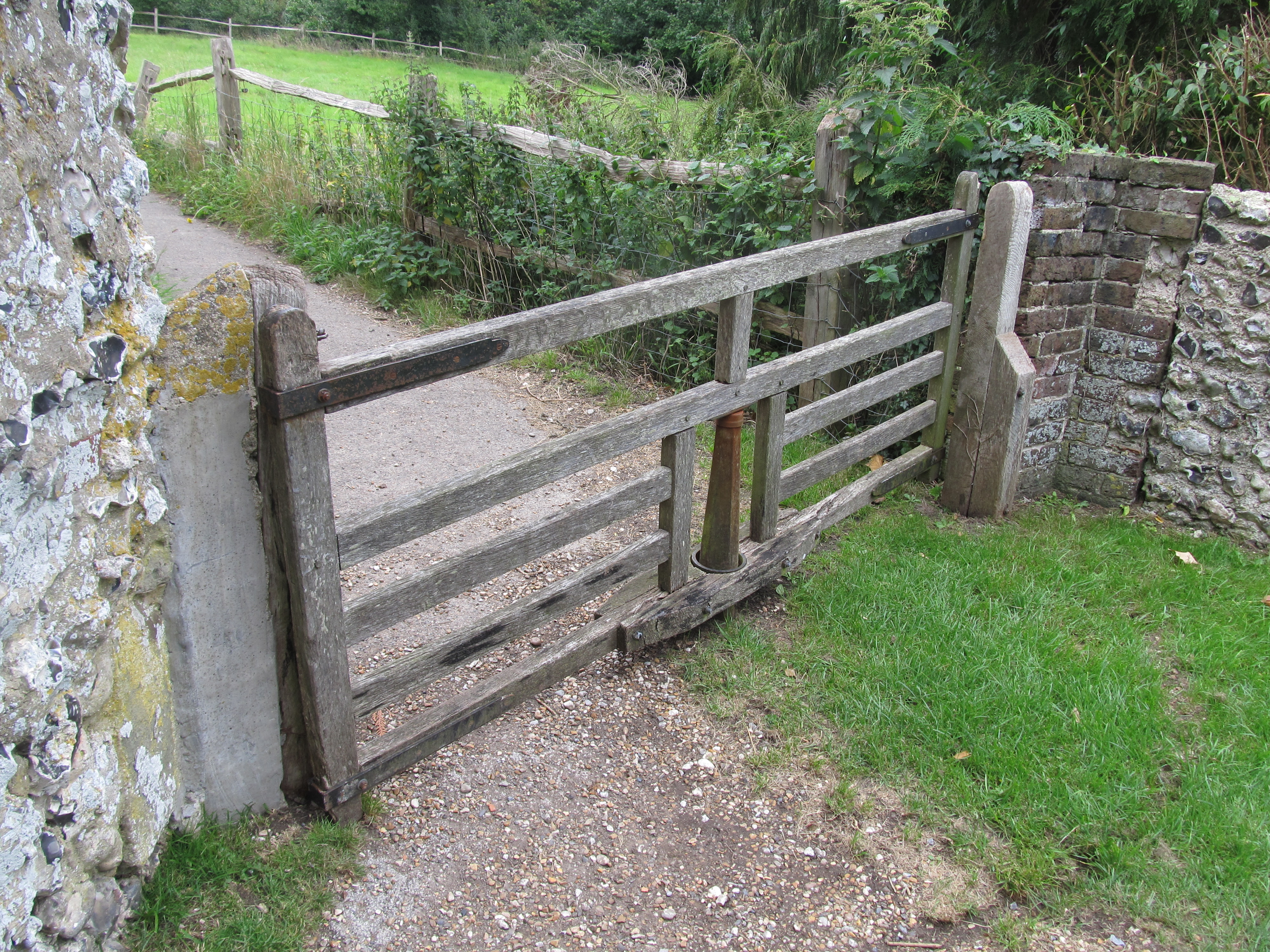
St Andrew's church, Jevington, East Sussex

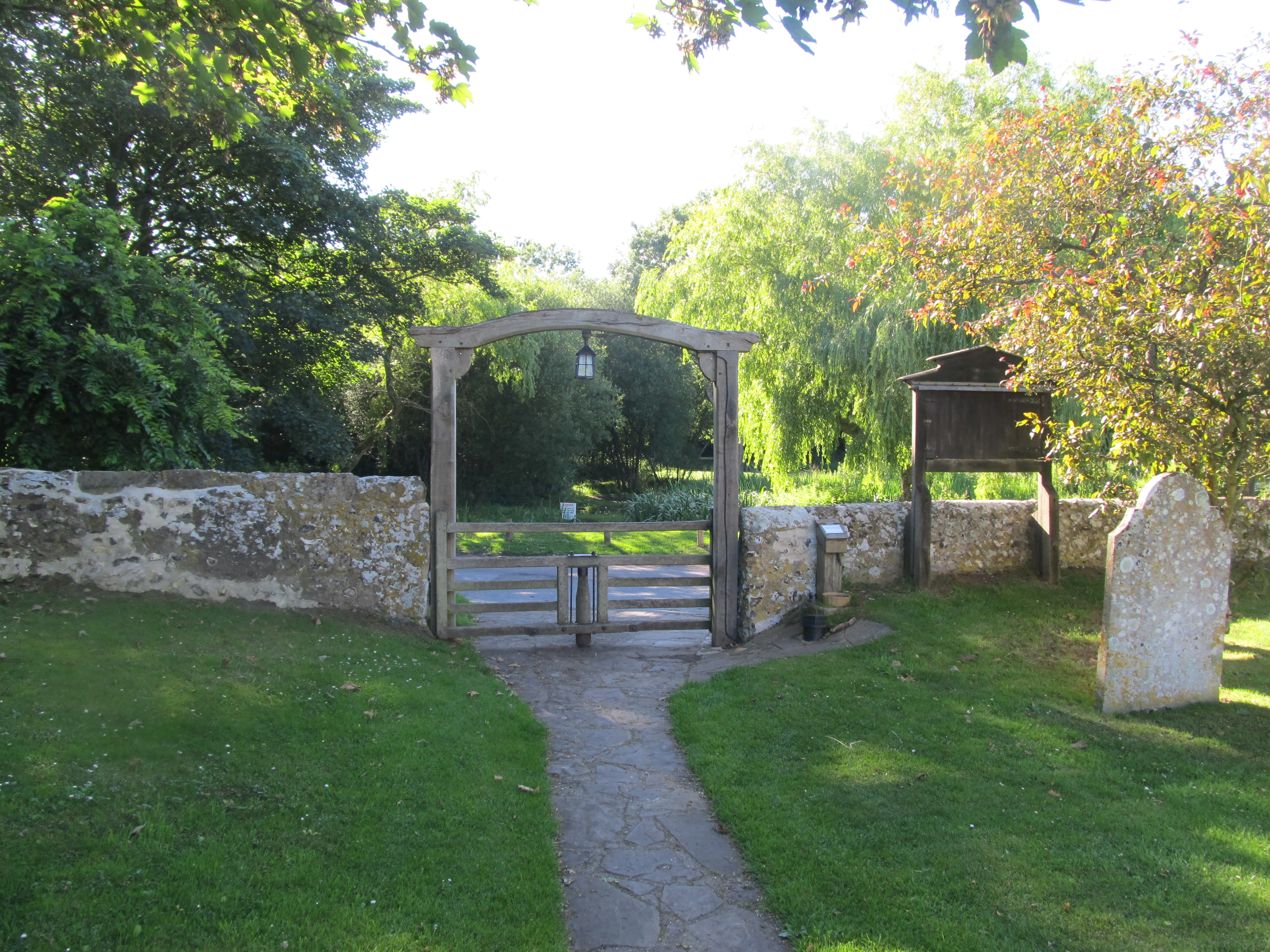
St Mary the Virgin church, Friston, East Sussex

Gates of various ages exist at village churches in East and West Sussex. St Simon and St Jude Church at East Dean, St Mary the Virgin Church at neighbouring Friston, and Coombes Church in the hamlet of Coombes retain their original gates, without any restoration. The gate at St Andrew's Church in Jevington was the only one with an integral stile, but this has been removed and it was restored in 1933. The local parish council has adopted the gate as its logo. The gate at the Church of the Transfiguration in Pyecombe is a replica of its original, and is topped by the curved end of a Pyecombe crook—a type of shepherd's crook popular among downland shepherds, which was made in a forge opposite the church.

St Pancras Church at Kingston near Lewes, has a modern replacement for the old gate which was first set up in 1729.

A short distance from Coombes Church, a modern Tapsel gate links the churchyard of St Botolph's Church in Botolphs, West Sussex, with an adjacent council burial ground. Completed and installed late in 2003, it was dedicated by the Area Bishop of Horsham in 2004.

No gates of the true Tapsel design have ever been reported outside Sussex, although variations on the concept have been seen occasionally. In 1896, for example, the Sussex Archaeological Society used the name "Tapsel gate" in its description of a device which opened and closed by means of a wheel, chain, and counterweight. This was at St Leonard's Church in Heston, Middlesex (now Greater London). There is also a counter-weighted Tapsel Gate in St Mary the Virgin Church, Weston Turville, Buckinghamshire.

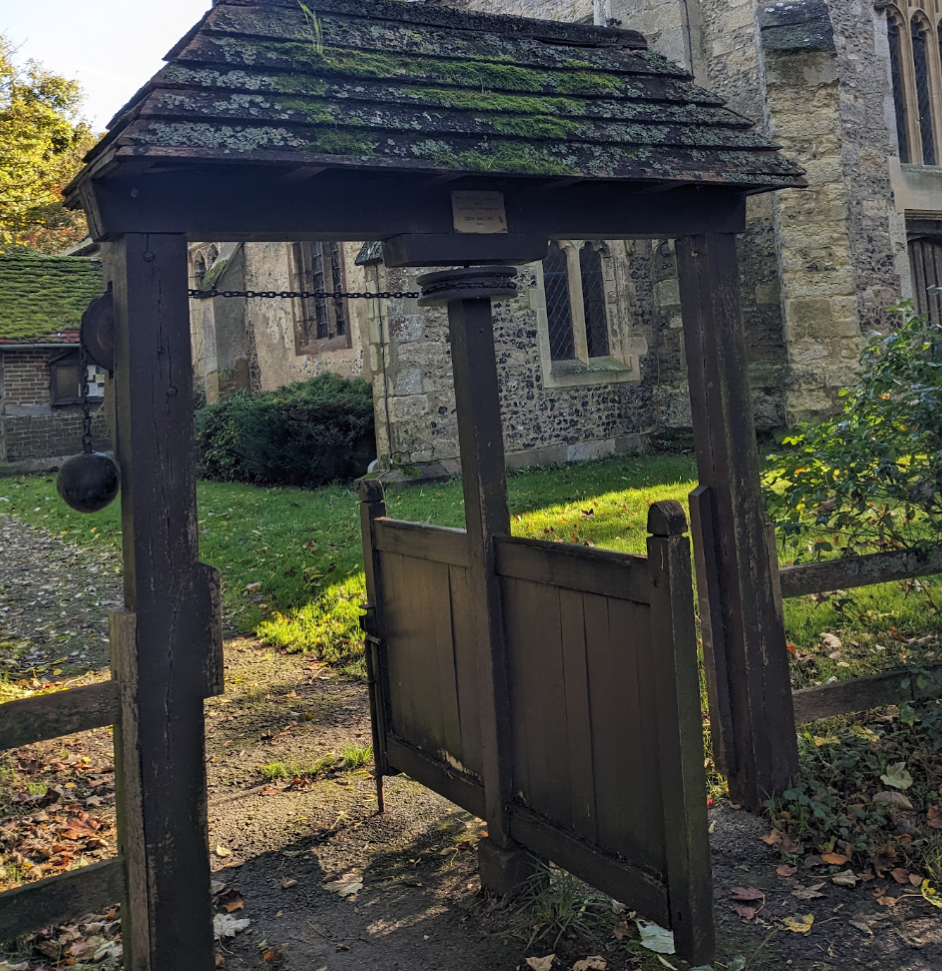
Counterbalanced Tapsel gate at Weston Turville, Bucks

The country house architect Ernest George designed and created one for the churchyard entrance of his church of St Pancras, Rousdon, Devon built in 1871-72.

The name also is used to describe gates of related, but not identical, design at St Wilfrid's Church in Burnsall, North Yorkshire (this gate is operated by a pulley mechanism), Hayes in West London, and North Cerney in Gloucestershire (these are integrated into lychgates rather than being free-standing).

== Design ==
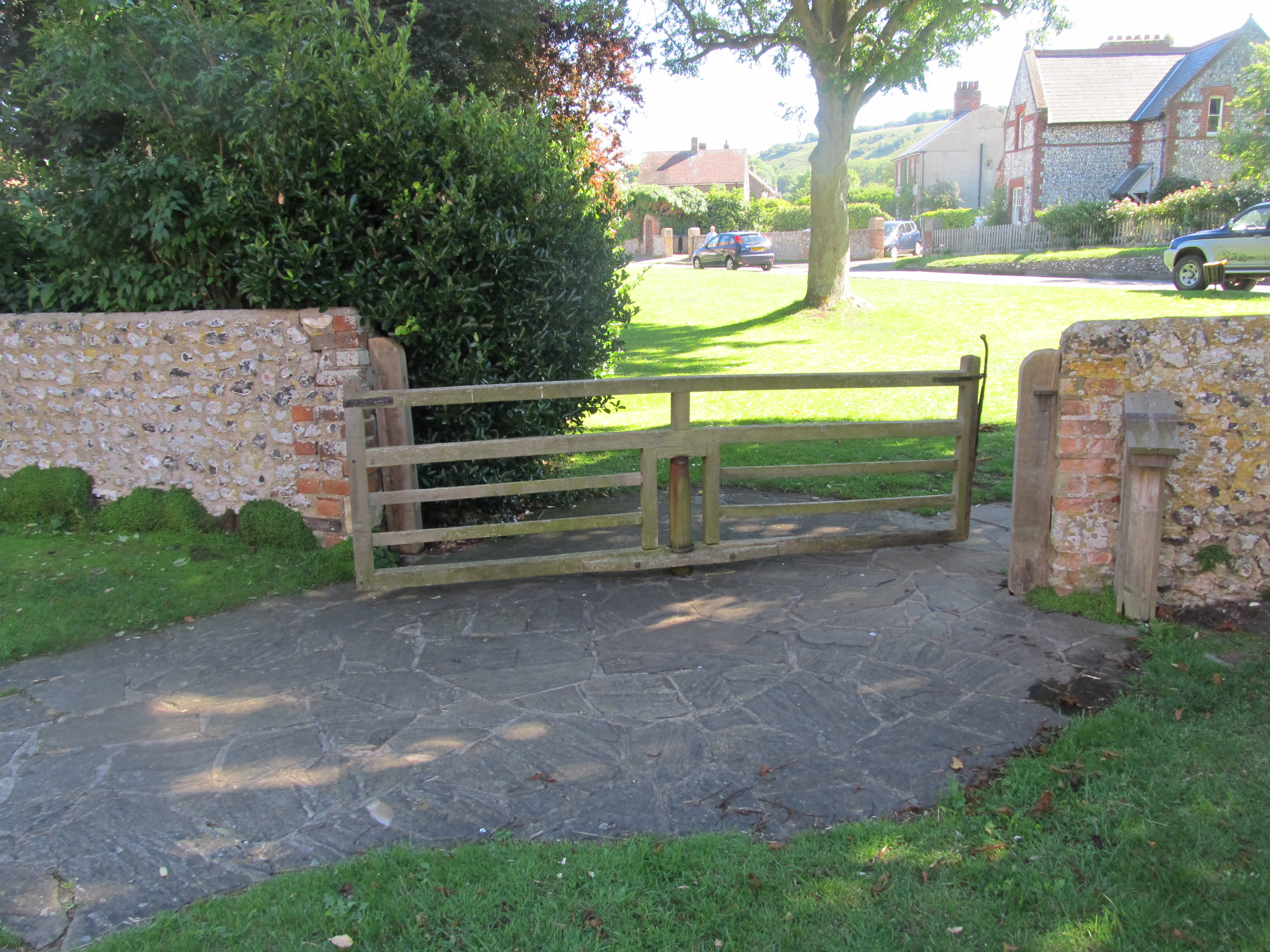
Tapsel gate at St Simon and St Jude church, East Dean

Tapsel gates are made of wood and are balanced on a solid wooden or metal pivot, instead of being hinged on one side. They can be opened easily, in either direction, with a small push; they therefore are much easier to negotiate than more typical gates. Common problems of side-hinged gates—heaviness and susceptibility to breakage, for example—are avoided. Also, a Tapsel gate can be opened in a smaller area than would be needed for a side-mounted gate. Because the gate is mounted in the centre of the opening in a wall, it effectively halves its width, which prevents passage by large animals, but allows people to pass through on either side easily. This characteristic is especially beneficial in churchyards, enabling pallbearers to carry a coffin through a gate without difficulty. Some gates additionally possess a shelf or platform on top enabling the pallbearers to rest on their way to the church.
