= Pyecombe hook =

A Pyecombe hook is a distinctive shepherd's crook crafted in the old forge at the village of Pyecombe in Sussex, England since the 19th century. The Pyecombe hook was perfectly balanced with a twist that allowed shepherds to easily catch the hind leg of a sheep without injuring the sheep. Its use is described by Charles Mitchell: "the curve is made so that the shepherd can hook it around the sheep's leg, slide it up, give it a slight twist, and the sheep is caught fast without being in the least hurt." It was often made out of old gun barrels.

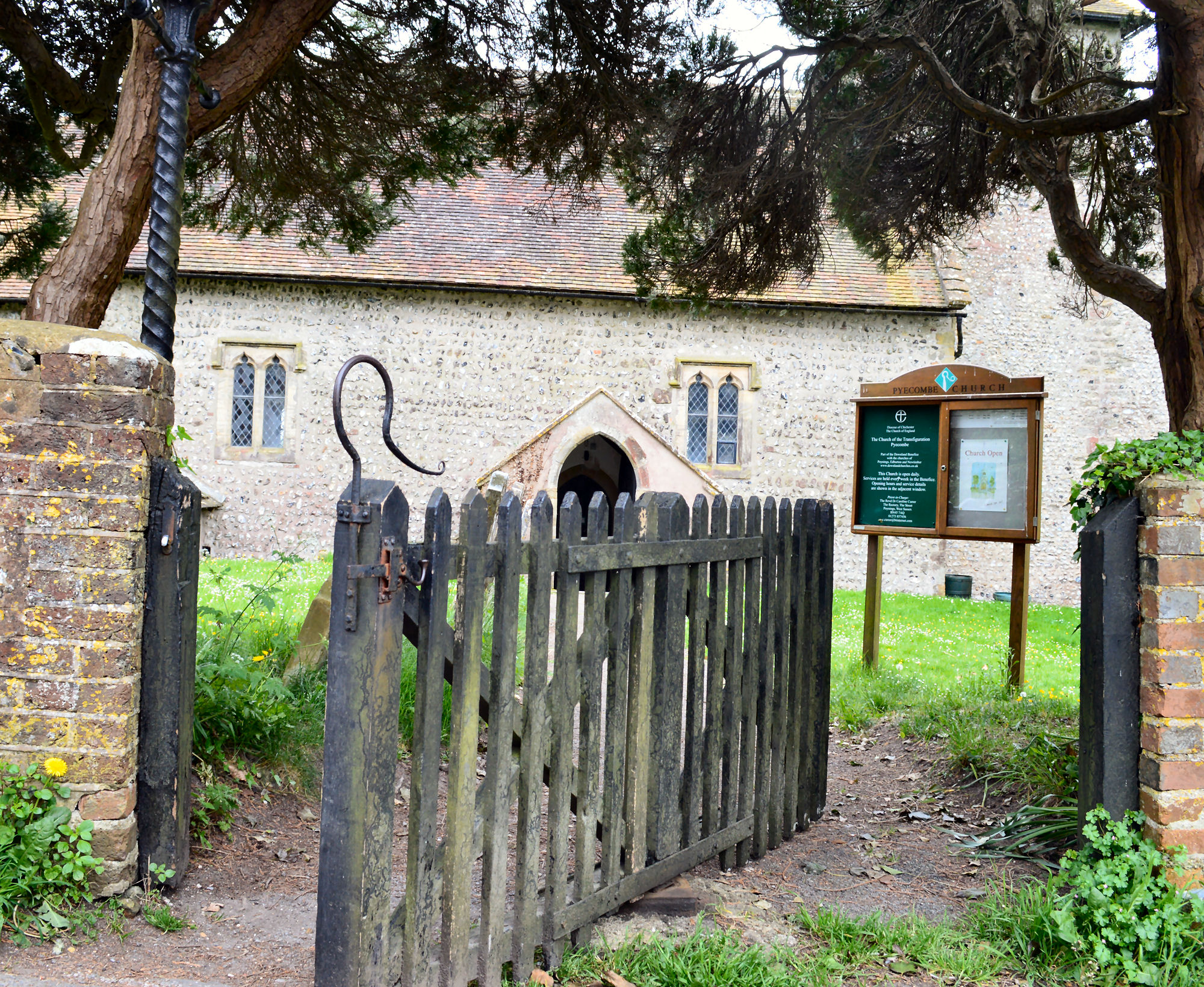
Tapsel Gate, Pyecombe Church

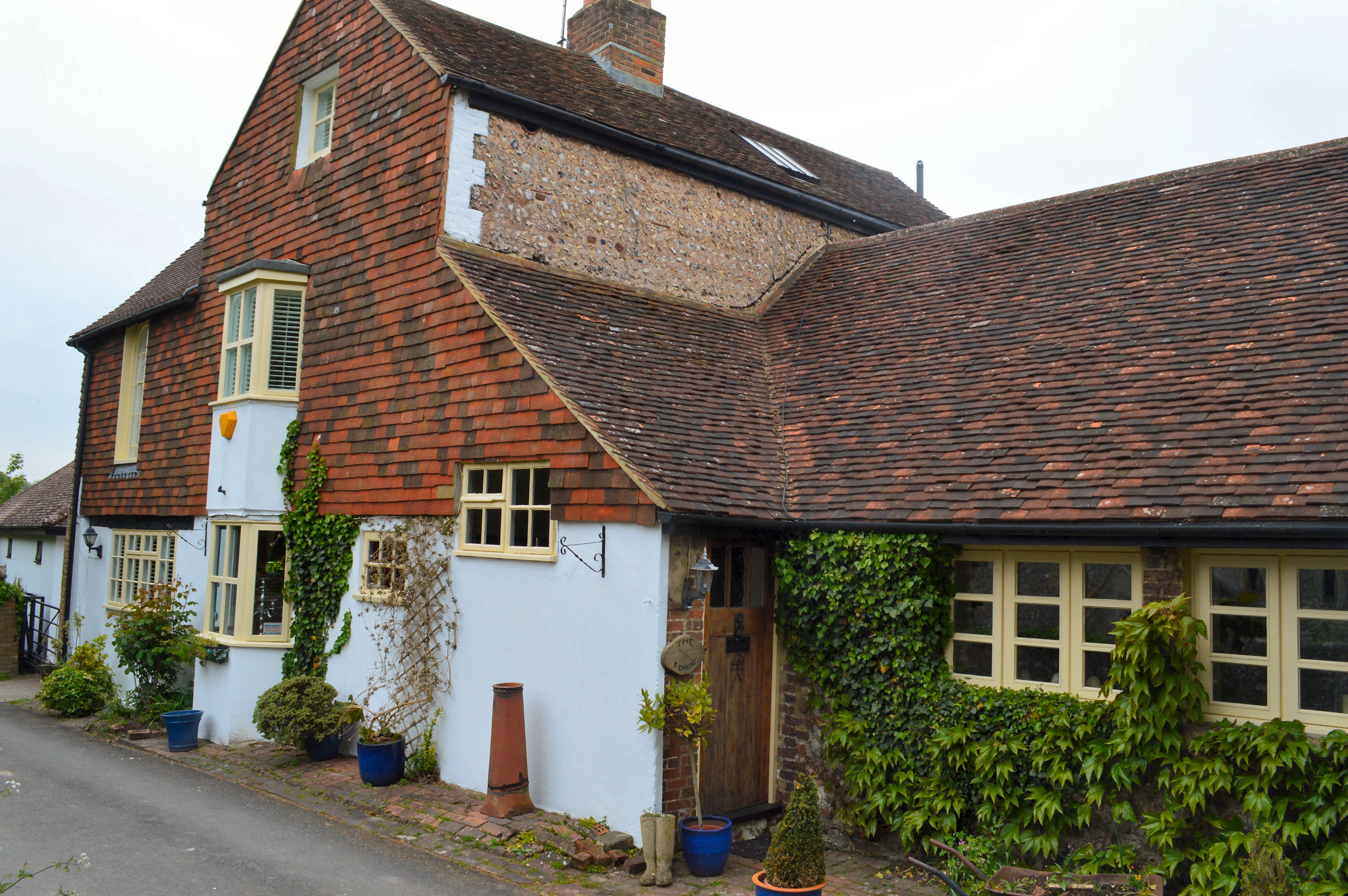
The old forge, Pyecombe

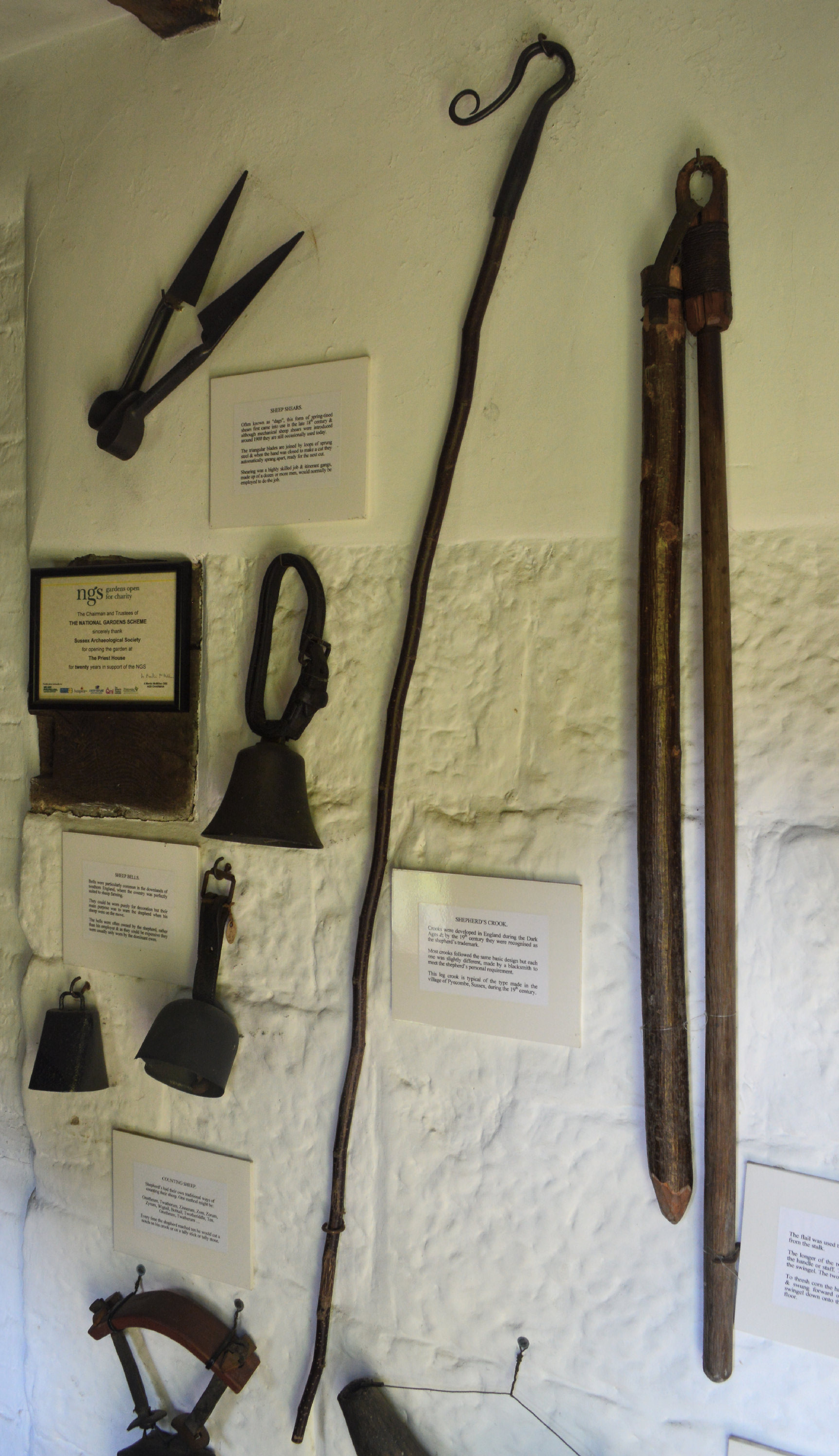
Pyecombe Hook at the Priest House, West Hoathly

Pyecombe village stands on an ancient drove road on the South Downs and has a long shepherding history. The Pyecombe hook was very popular amongst shepherds in Sussex for about 200 years.

A surviving Pyecombe hook is integrated into the Tapsel gate at the entrance to the Churchyard of Pyecombe church. It is illustrated on the Pyecombe village sign. There is an example in the Sussex Archaeological Society's Museum at Lewes and at The Priest House, West Hoathly. The painting of the Nativity at St Michael and All Angels, Berwick, East Sussex, by Vanessa Bell includes shepherds holding the Pyecombe hook.

It was made in the first half of the 19th century by Mr Berry, the blacksmith, in the old forge, now a private house, just opposite the entrance to the church. It continued to be made there by his successor, Mr Charles Mitchell, who owned the forge from 1872 to 1946. The church has a ceremonial Pyecombe hook made by Mr Sean Black, the last blacksmith resident at the forge from 1946.

The hook is celebrated in song:-

THE PYECOMBE CROOK

Hefty of arm he hammered it out,

in clangour of forge and flame of fire;

Red it rolled on the anvil's bosom,

Bent and bowed to the smith's desire;

He laughed as he lifted it, laughed and sang

The song that is older than ink or pen:

"O well I know,

Who knows no book,

Where'er you go

Is never a crook,

Can better the crooks of the Pyecombe forge,

The crooks of the Pyecombe men."
