= Church of the Transfiguration, Pyecombe =

Church in West Sussex, England

Church of the Transfiguration
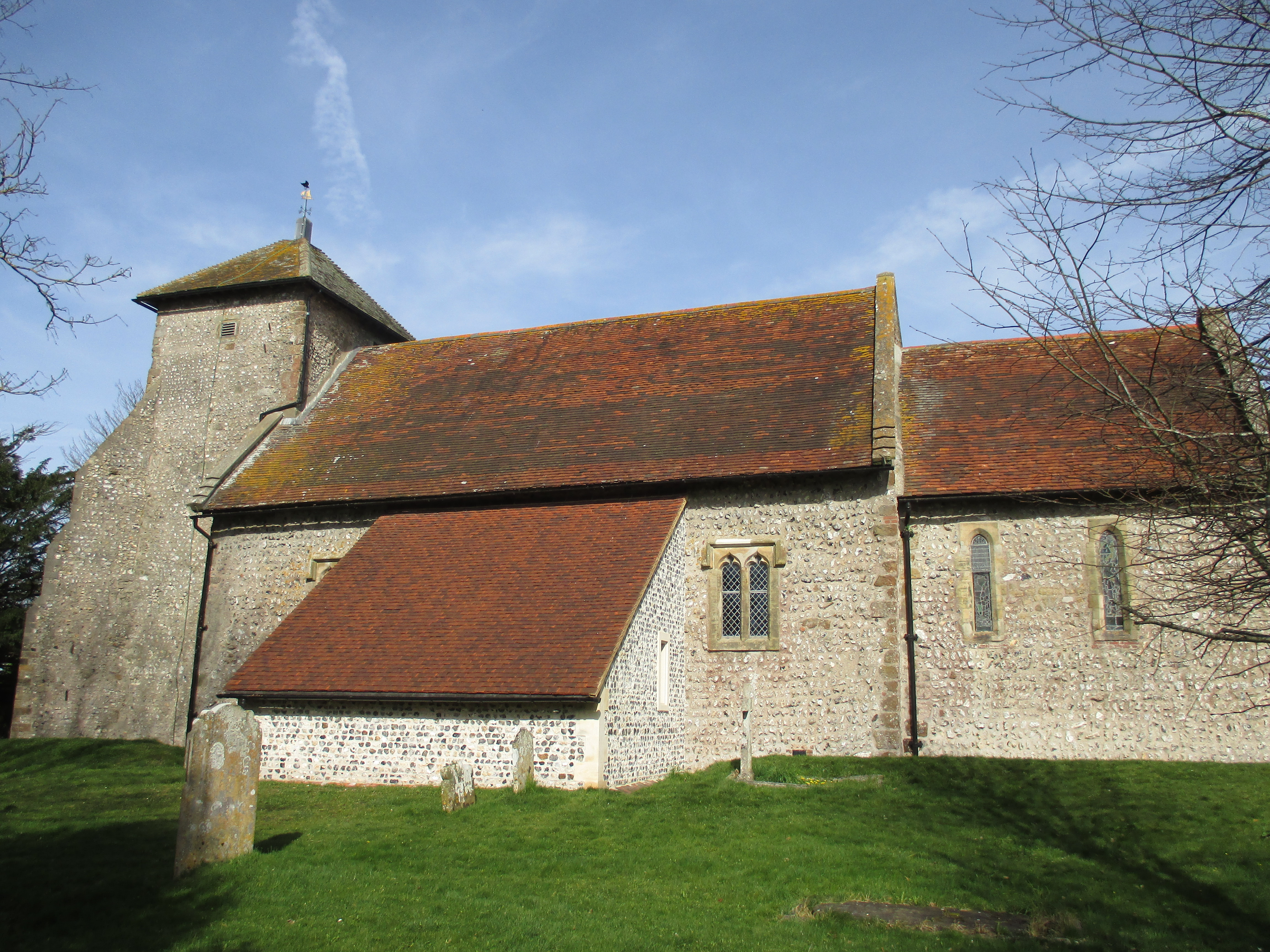
- The church from the southeast
- Church of the Transfiguration
- 50°53′54″N 0°9′52″W
- Location: Church Hill, Pyecombe, Hassocks, West Sussex BN45 7FE
- Country: England
- Denomination: Anglican

History
- Status: Parish church
- Dedication: Transfiguration of Jesus

Architecture
- Functional status: Active
- Heritage designation: Grade I
- Designated: 28 October 1957
- Style: Medieval

Administration
- Province: Province of Canterbury
- Diocese: Diocese of Chichester
- Archdeaconry: Chichester
- Deanery: Hurst
- Parish: Pyecombe, The Transfiguration

Clergy
- Priest: Rev. Peter Morgan

The Church of the Transfiguration is the Church of England parish church of the village of Pyecombe, in the Mid Sussex District of West Sussex, England. The mostly 12th- and 13th-century building, in an isolated setting facing the South Downs, has been designated a Grade I Listed building.

== History ==
The small village of Pyecombe is situated in a long, deep valley (or coombe) formed by the river Wellesbourne as it flows towards the English Channel at Brighton. (The river is now a winterbourne and runs underground for most of its length.) The South Downs rise to about 700 feet (210 m) to the east and west. The village is in two parts about 0.25 miles (0.40 km) apart. The original medieval settlement formed around the church and an ancient trackway across the South Downs; when this declined, new development took place to the west. A 16th-century cottage which may have been part of the manor house is in this newer area. Pyecombe manor was probably split from the larger manor of Pangdean (mentioned in the Domesday Book) by the 13th century, although they were later reunited.

The church was built on the west side of the trackway, which was at the centre of three ancient routes across the South Downs which split at the south end of the village. The western route became the main London Road, now the A23; the eastern route forms the A273 to Clayton, Hassocks, Burgess Hill and Haywards Heath. The church existed, under the name of Pangdean (or Pingeden) Church, at the time of the Domesday Book in 1086, when the St Pancras Priory at Lewes held the advowson. In 1537, during the Reformation, it passed to King Henry VIII.

The oldest parts of the present structure, the chancel, chancel arch and nave, are 12th-century; a date of 1170 has been attributed. The Norman tower at the west end was built in the 13th century and holds one 15th-century bell. A roughcast finish was applied to the whole exterior in 1898, but this has now been removed except on the outside of a blocked doorway on the south side. As well as this restoration, some work was carried out on the church in 1844 and 1914.

== Architecture ==
The church is aligned from east to west with its chancel and altar at the east end. It consists of a 12th-century chancel and plain, semicircular chancel arch; a nave of the same age, with two rectangular windows on each side; and a short tower from the 13th century, with two angled buttresses at the southwestern and northwestern corners. The former has a 13th-century gravestone incorporated into the stonework, but the buttresses are no earlier than 14th-century. On the north side is an entrance porch and a vestry. Horsham stone tiles are used for the church and porch roofs and the shallow "Sussex cap"-style roof of the tower.

In common with many Sussex churches, flint was used as the main building material. This was hidden under the roughcasting for about a century, but has now been revealed again. There are modern stone dressings around the windows. Some of the windows themselves are also 19th-century copies, although those in the nave are from the 15th century.

Inside, the chancel arch has a smaller modern arch on each side. The tiled floor of the sanctuary dates from the 13th century; the encaustic tiles were made at St Pancras Priory, and retain designs showing animals and birds. The carved pulpit is dated 1636, although it was remodelled in 1898. The lectern has similar carvings. One surviving 12th-century internal fixture is the font, made of one strip of lead bent into a drum shape and sealed at the join. The exterior has ornate scrollwork designs.

== Tapsel gate ==
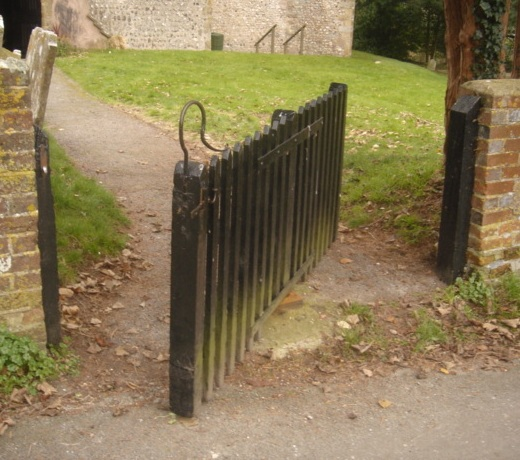
The Tapsel gate

There is a rare design of gate on the north side of the churchyard. Unique to Sussex, and named after the Sussex family who were responsible for its invention, the Tapsel gate is one of only six remaining in the county, although others may have existed in the past. All are found within 10 miles (16 km) of Lewes. The Tapsel gate at Pyecombe is an early 20th-century replacement: the original was put in place in the 18th century. It incorporates the hooked end of a Pyecombe crook—a type of shepherd's staff made in the village since the 18th century.

Tapsel gates are mounted on a central pivot. Even when fully open, they are too narrow to allow cattle to enter churchyards, but they are easier for pallbearers to negotiate than a normal side-hinged gate: they can pass on each side and the coffin can be rested on the central pivot if necessary.

== The church today ==
The Church of the Transfiguration is part of the Benefice of Poynings with Edburton, Newtimber and Pyecombe. This covers five downland villages, each with one church: the others are St Andrew's Church at Edburton, Holy Trinity Church at Poynings and St John the Evangelist's Church in Newtimber. The former church of the Good Shepherd at Fulking is no longer in use but is nominally part of the Benefice. The parish itself covers Pyecombe village and the surrounding farms and downland, as far south as the Brighton and Hove boundary and north to Clayton.

The church was Grade I listed on 28 October 1957. The local District Council designated the area around the church a conservation area in January 1989.

Two services take place each month, and Pyecombe Parish Council holds its meetings in the church.

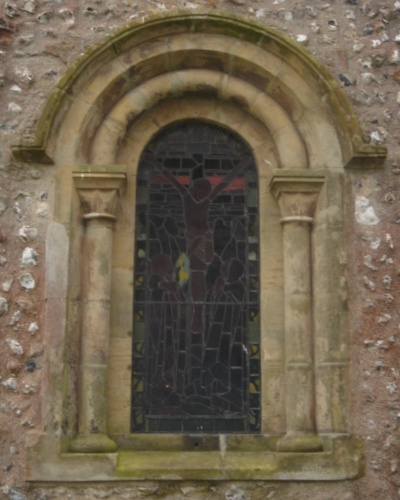
The east window

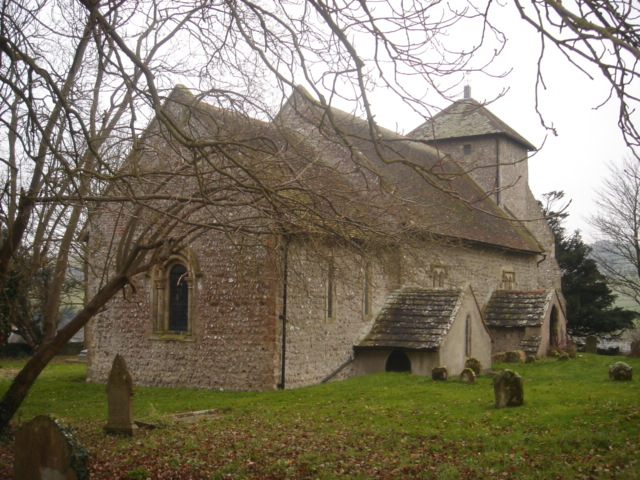
The church from the northeast, showing the vestry and porch

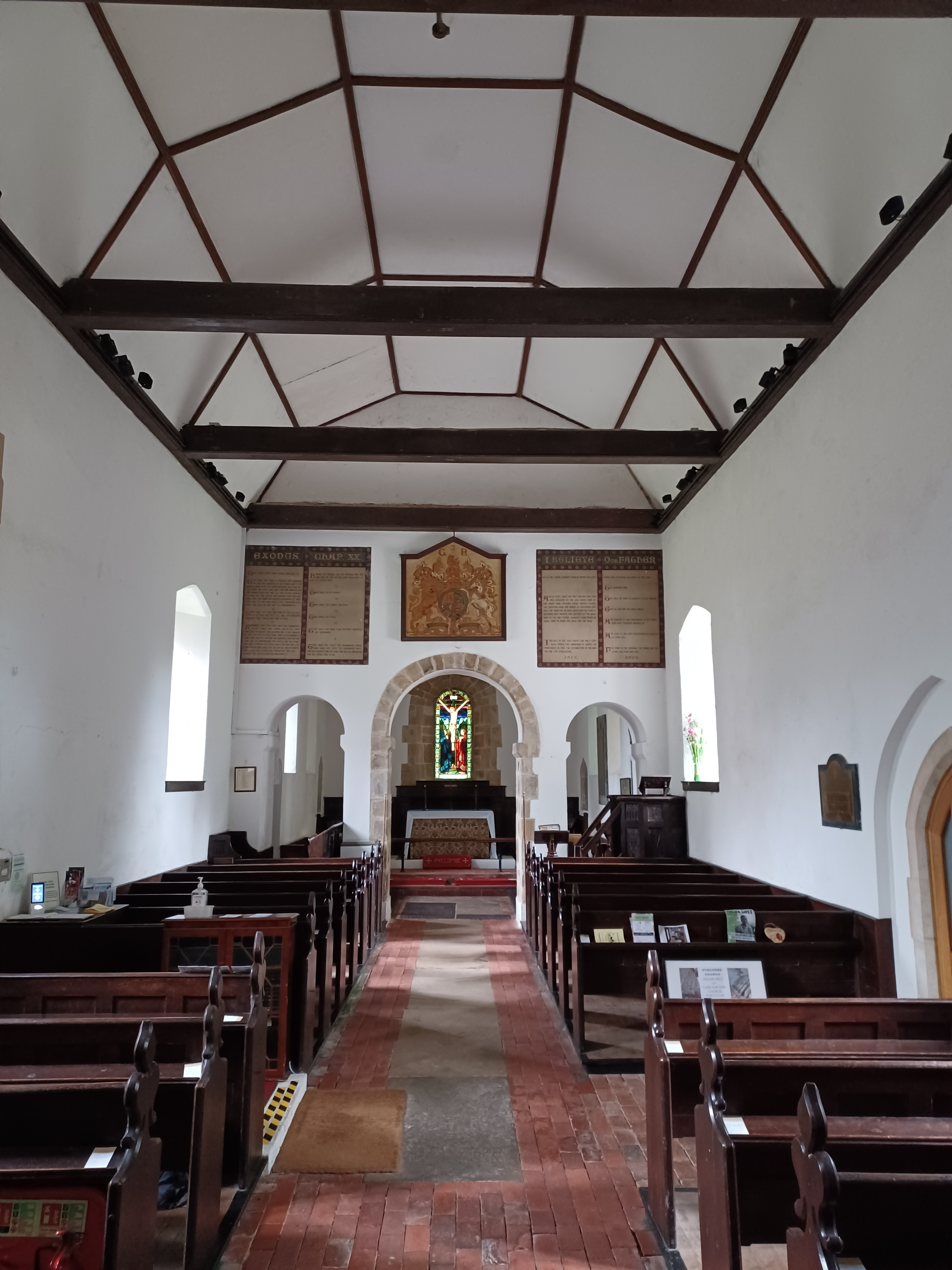
Interior of the church
