= Botolphs =

Village and parish in West Sussex, England

Coordinates: 50.871°N 0.306°W

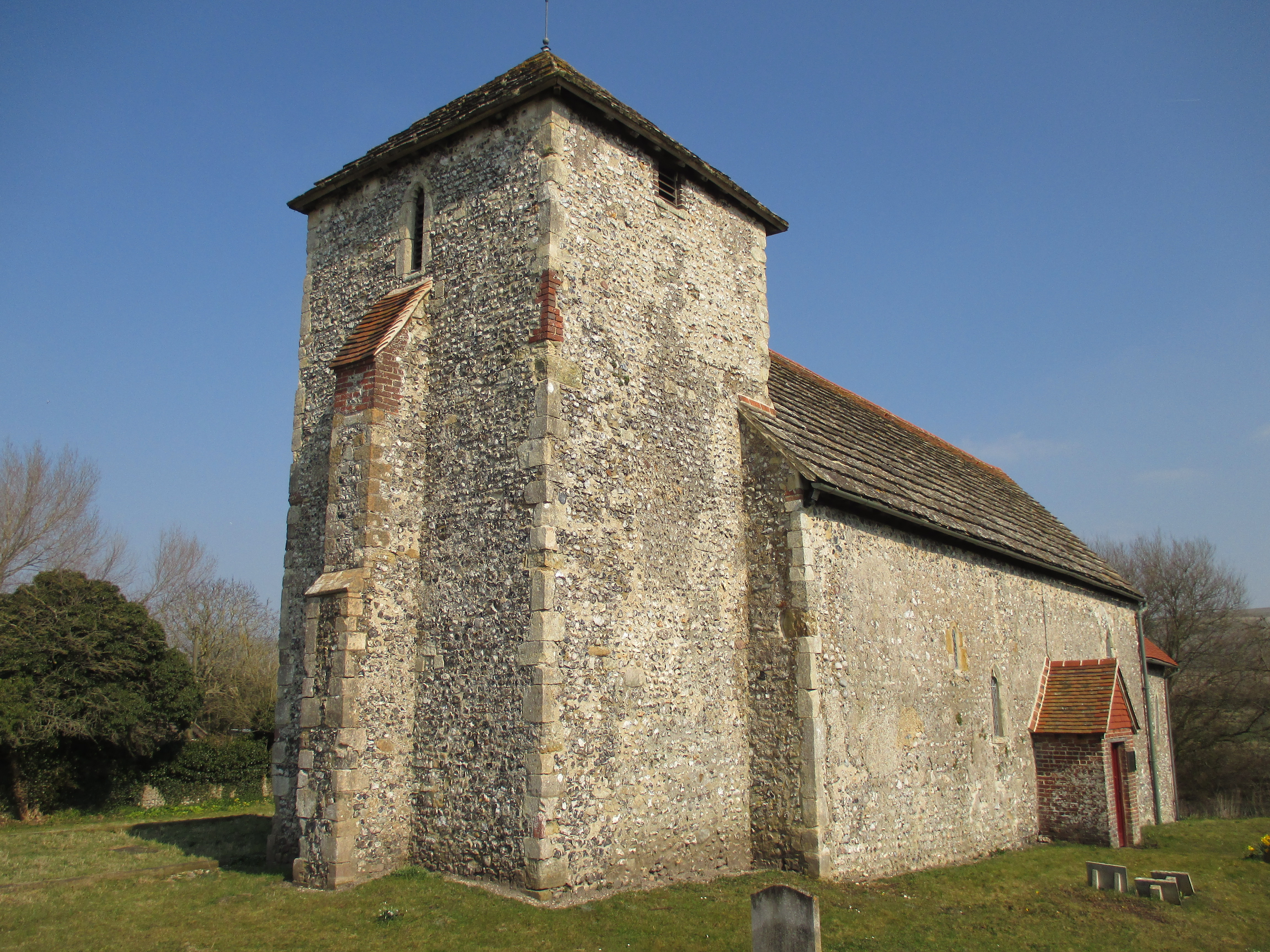
- St. Botolph's parish church

- Location within West Sussex
- OS grid reference: TQ193093
- Civil parish: Bramber
- District: Horsham
- Shire county: West Sussex
- Region: South East
- Country: England
- Sovereign state: United Kingdom
- Post town: Steyning
- Postcode district: BN44
- Dialling code: 01903
- Police: Sussex
- Fire: West Sussex
- Ambulance: South East Coast
- UK Parliament: Arundel and South Downs

Botolphs, is a village and former civil parish, located in the parish of Bramber, in the Horsham District of West Sussex, England. It is in the Adur Valley 1.5 miles (2.4 km) southeast of Steyning on the road between Steyning and Coombes.

Botolphs lies on the South Downs Way long-distance footpath. In 1931 the parish had a population of 64. On 1 April 1933 the parish was abolished and merged with Bramber.

== Parish church ==
The ancient parish church of St Botolph's is dated from 950 and large parts of the Saxon building remain, particularly in the chancel arch, and in the south wall of the nave. The tower was added in the mid-13th century, as was the chancel, replacing a Saxon apse.

The church was dedicated to Saint Peter in the earliest Norman records, and the community was then called Annington. It seems likely that an original dedication to Saint Botolph was considered obscure by the Norman invaders, and the church was therefore rededicated. This was a common practice. However, the original dedication lived on in community memory, and eventually prevailed. By the 13th century almost all references are to "St Botolph's Church" and the 14th century saw the last known recorded reference to "St Peter's Church". By a process of association the village acquired the name of Botolphs. The name Annington also survives, as a hamlet between Botolphs and Bramber.

== Population and economy ==
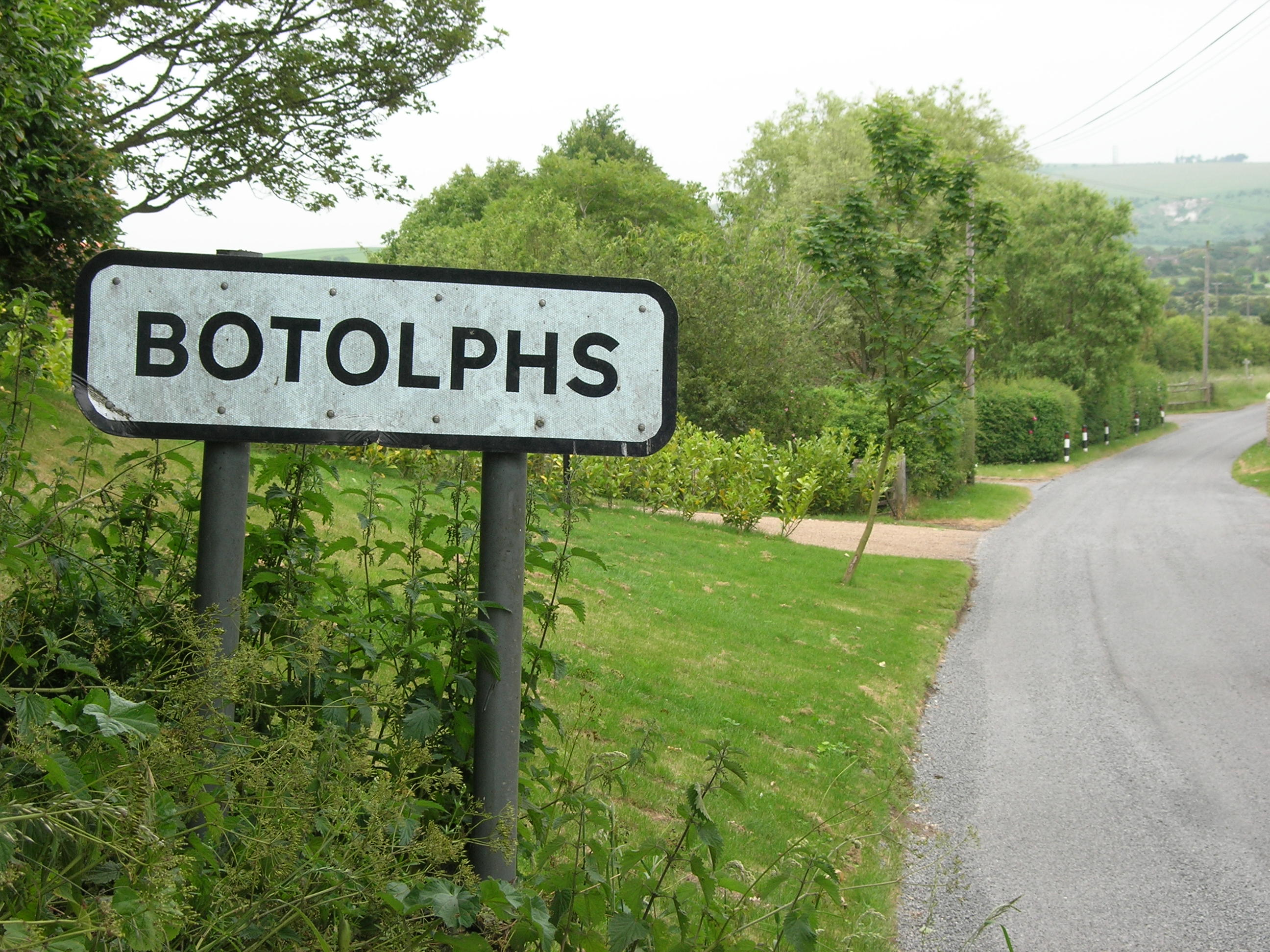
The Botolphs Village signboard at the boundary with Annington, showing the single surfaced road.

Botolphs is a linear village. There is only one surfaced road, the country lane between Steyning and Lancing. The neighbouring hamlet of Annington and village of Coombes are also both on this road. There are some dirt tracks leading to more remote homes, such as the house Tin Pots that dominates many postcard views of the village but is some distance from the road. Most residents live in houses along the surfaced road.

Botolphs once had a sizeable population with the tidal River Adur supporting both navigation and salt extraction. The decline of both industries (largely due to the silting of the river) led to a rapid contraction, and in 1534 the ecclesiastical parish of Botolphs was united with that of Bramber. The village population has remained fairly constant from then to the present day, at around 50 to 60 people. The community once had an independent civil parish council, but this followed the precedent of the ecclesiastical parish by being absorbed into Bramber.

After the decline of the shipping and salt industries, the only real economy for the village for many years was farming. In the second half of the 19th and first half of the 20th centuries the Steyning Line railway supported the local economy with platelayer's cottages built near the church. Today the major industry in the community is farming. There are also some light industrial units at the Annington Industrial Estate in the neighbouring hamlet. Most residents work outside the community, some commuting to London.

== Manor ==
The manor was once held by members of the Levett family, a Sussex family of Norman origin, who probably inherited by marriage from the Merlots. In 1585 Lawrence Levett of Hollington died in possession of the manor of Botolphs, which he left to his sister Maria, wife of Thomas Eversfield. It remained with the Eversfield family for several centuries until it was bought by Charles Goring.

The Saint Mary Magdalene leper hospital was located in neighbouring Bramber, in the area now known as Maudlyn (a corruption of Magdalene). The leprous inmates were not allowed to attend Bramber's fashionable castle church and were sent instead to observe the mass at Botolphs, where two leper squints were provided in the chancel walls.

Inside Botolph's church the walls bear many plaques commemorating the local Penfold family, whose descendants emigrated to Australia and are now famous for wine production under the Penfolds label.

== Sources and further reading ==
- Cary-Elwes, Dudley George; Robinson, Charles John (1876). A History of the Castles, Mansions and Manors of Western Sussex. London, Lewes: Longman, George P. Bacon. pp. 40–41. "levit sussex."
- Hudson, T.P. (ed.); Baggs, A.P.; Currie, C.R.J.; Elrington, C.R.; Keeling, S.M.; Rowland, A.M. (1980). A History of the County of Sussex: Volume 6 Part 1: Bramber Rape (Southern Part). Victoria County History. pp. 195–199.
- Lower, Mark Antony (1870). A Compendious History of Sussex, Topographical, Archæological & Anecdotical. Vol. I. Lewes, London, Brighton: George P. Bacon, John Russell Smith, W.J. Smith. p. 68.
- Nairn, Ian; Pevsner, Nikolaus (1965). Sussex. The Buildings of England. Harmondsworth: Penguin Books. p. 113. ISBN 0-14-071028-0.
