= Coombes Church =

Church in West Sussex, England

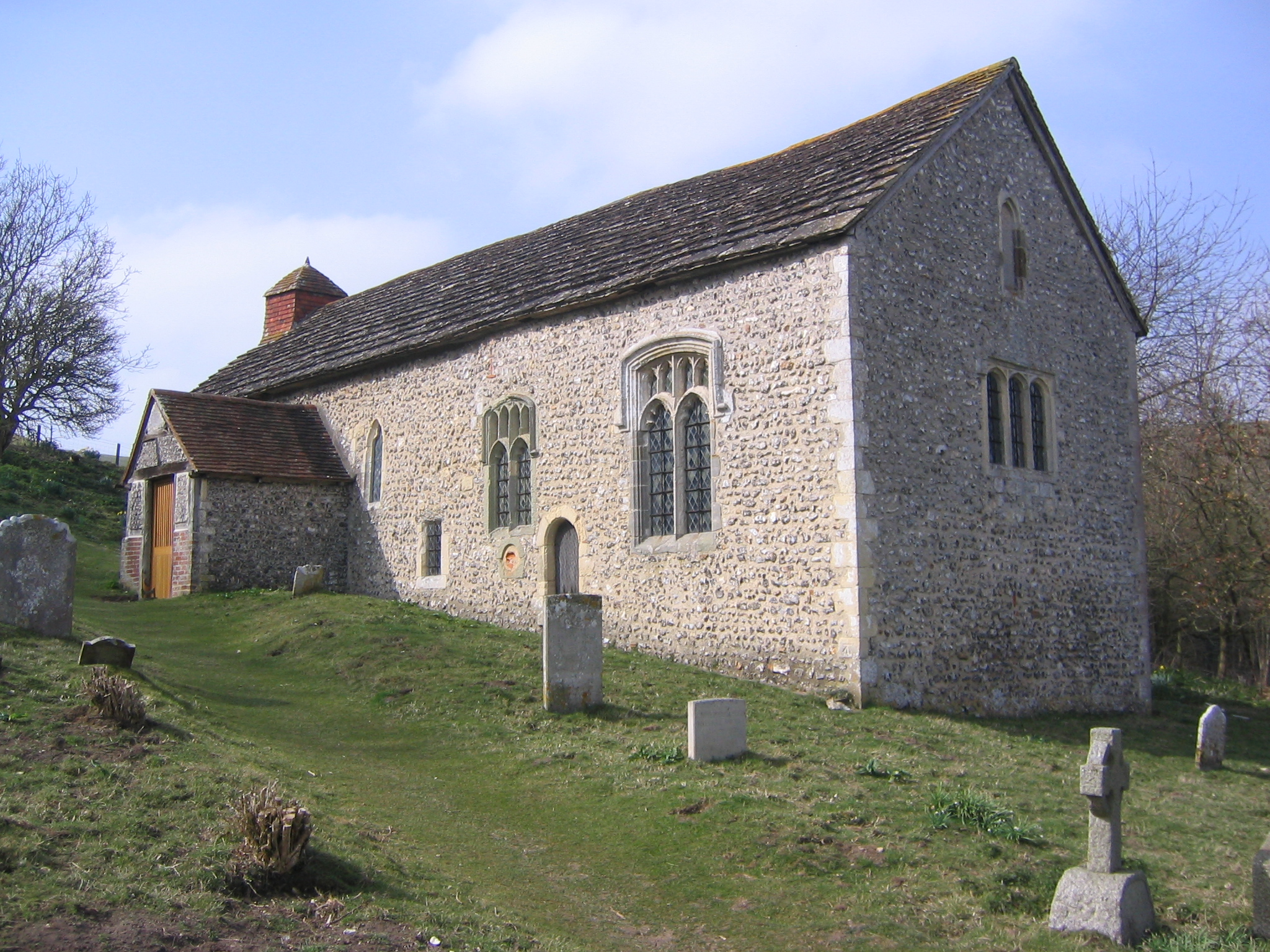
- The church from the east
- Coombes Church
- 50.8607°N 0.3097°W
- Location: Coombes Road, Coombes, West Sussex BN15 0RS
- Country: England
- Denomination: Church of England
- Churchmanship: Anglo-Catholic
- Website: https://www.chalkspringchurches.org/coombes

History
- Status: Active
- Founded: 11th century
- Dedication: None

Architecture
- Heritage designation: Grade I
- Designated: 12 October 1954
- Style: Saxon; Early Norman

Administration
- Diocese: Chichester
- Archdeaconry: Chichester
- Deanery: Rural Deanery of Worthing
- Parish: Lancing with Coombes

Clergy
- Rector: Vacancy

Coombes Church is a Church of England parish church in the rural hamlet of Coombes in the Adur District of West Sussex, England. It has served the rural parish, northwest of Shoreham-by-Sea and next to the River Adur, since the 11th century. Despite several re-buildings, some structural elements remain from that period. An important series of wall paintings, dating from the 12th to the 18th century, were uncovered in 1949. Historic England has listed the church at Grade I for its architectural and historical importance.

== History ==
The parish of Coombes existed, with the name Cumbe, at the time of the Domesday Book in 1086, when it supported two manors and their associated settlements. Coombes was the larger at the time but neither it nor Applesham (the other hamlet) was significant. The settlements, high on the South Downs above the River Adur's floodplain, may have had their origins in a pair of Saxon-era estates. The Domesday Book recorded 31 people in Coombes and a further 16 in Applesham.

Coombes parish church, whose original dedication has now been lost (although it has been attributed to John the Baptist), existed at the time of the Domesday Book. At that time it was a simple flint building in three parts: chancel, nave and a tower at the west end. It was built so far into the rising land of the hillside that the base of the west window was just above the ground. The building was added to and altered several times over the next few centuries in a manner that Ian Nairn described as a "century-by-century accretion of piety".

Most of the nave, its south doorway and the chancel arch are Saxon but the chancel was rebuilt in the early 13th century and a priest's doorway was added. In the 14th century the nave windows were altered, but one 12th-century window survives in good condition. In the 15th century two new windows were added to the chancel, flanking a surviving Norman door. A porch was built on the south side of the nave in the 16th century, incorporating the original entrance doorway into the nave.

The church suffered a near-total collapse in the early 18th century: the tower at the west end fell down, bringing most of the nave and chancel down with it. The congregation was allowed to rebuild the nave itself (shortening it in the process) and the chancel was rebuilt soon afterwards. Around the same time a tile-hung bell-turret was added at the west end. The church, unlike many in Sussex, was not restored or reconfigured during the Victorian era.

== Wall paintings ==
The church is most noted for its extensive wall paintings. Most of the surviving designs date from the 12th century – the oldest were produced in about 1135 – but some are more recent. They were discovered in 1949 and preserved with minimal restoration, unlike many similar examples elsewhere. Designs include The Visitation, the Nativity of Jesus, Christ in Majesty and Christ delivering the Keys of Heaven to Saint Peter and the Book to Saint Paul. On the soffit beneath the chancel arch is a humorous sketch: a man with a gaping mouth grimaces as he strains to hold up the arch.

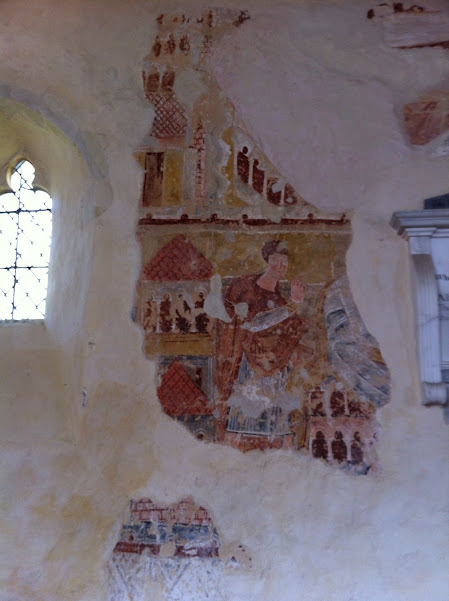
An example of one of the wall paintings in the church

One theory is that these early paintings are part of a series painted at churches by monks from Lewes Priory, England's first Cluniac house. Others survive at the churches in Clayton, Hardham and Plumpton.

== Architecture and fittings ==
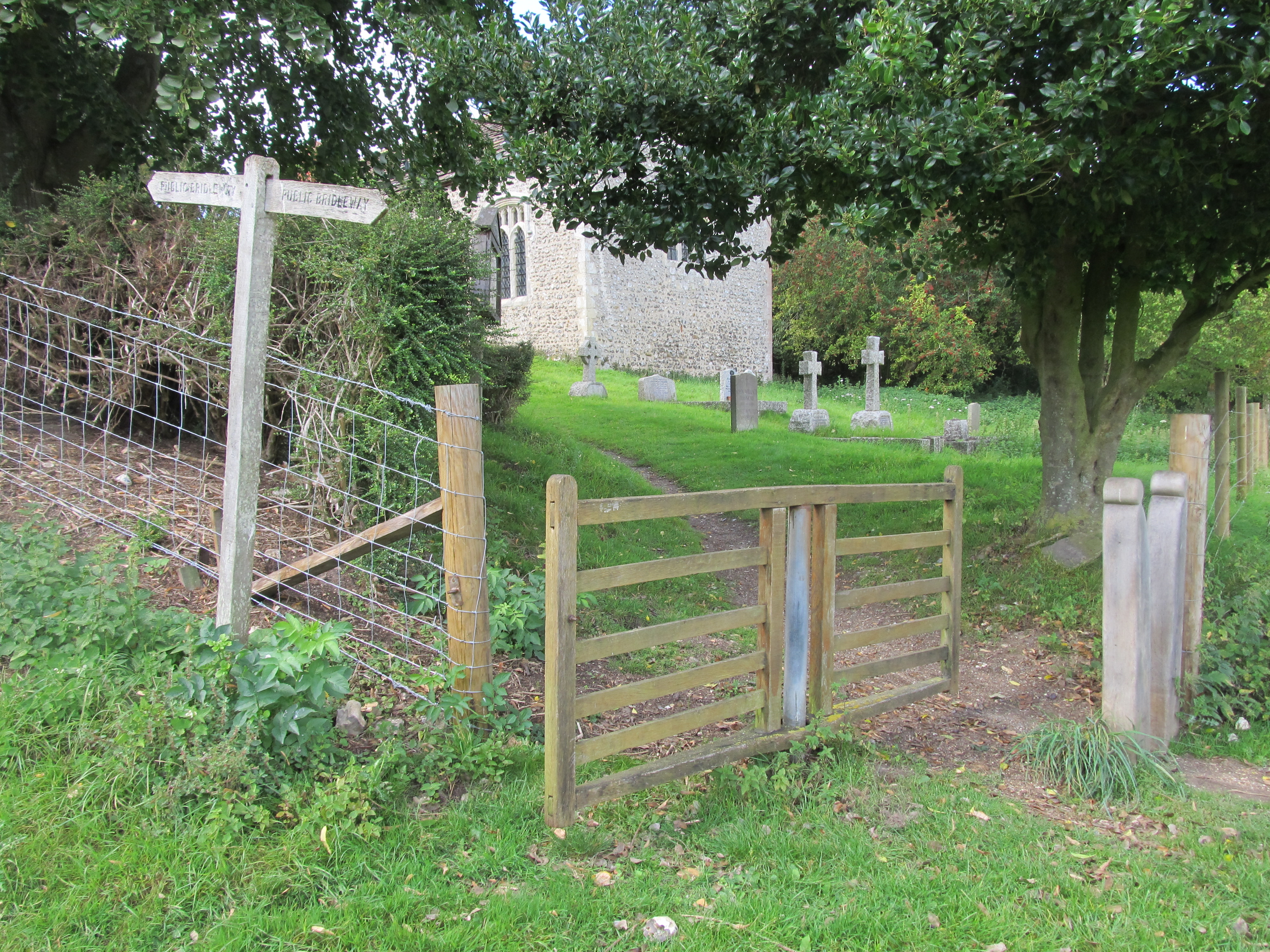
Tapsel gate

Coombes parish church is a simple building of two parts: the chancel at the east end and the nave to the west, linked by chancel arch 30 inches (76 cm) thick. A porch, incorporating the entrance door, faces south. The former west tower has been replaced by a small bell-turret at the west end of the roof. Flint rubble masonry, relieved by some dressings of ashlar, forms the walls. The roof is of Horsham Stone slates, in common with many historic Sussex buildings.

Only one Norman window remains in its original condition, but several others are blocked up. The windows on the south side of the chancel are in the Perpendicular Gothic, while the 16th-century east window and 1724 west window are simpler.

The churchyard is one of very few to have a tapsel gate – a centrally pivoted gate unique to Sussex. An ancient crucifix was found in the churchyard in 1877, when it was moved into the church. The age of the brick and stone font is not known. It may be 19th century but other sources propose more ancient origins.

== The church today ==
Coombes Church was listed Grade I by English Heritage on 12 October 1954. Such buildings are defined as being of "exceptional interest" and great national importance. As of February 2001 it was one of seven Grade I listed buildings and 119 listed buildings of all grades in Adur District.

A Said Mass is celebrated on selected Sundays with occasional Evensongs to celebrate the agricultural year. (See Website) Worship is in the Anglo-Catholic style.

The ecclesiastical parish covers an almost entirely rural area of 1,280 acres (520 ha). Its boundaries are defined by the River Adur in the east and ancient field and estate boundaries to the south, west and north.

== See also ==
- List of places of worship in Adur
