= Horsham Stone =

Type of sandstone

Horsham Stone is a type of calcareous, flaggy sandstone containing millions of minute sand grains and occurring naturally in the Weald Clay of south-east England. It is also high in mica and quartz. The rock extends in an arc-like formation for several kilometres around the town of Horsham from which it takes its name, and lies just below the Weald Clay surface in bands 10 to 13 centimetres (3.9 to 5.1 in) thick. Horsham Stone is significant for its ripple-marked appearance, formed by the action of the sea similar to the ripples on the sandbanks and beaches of Sussex.

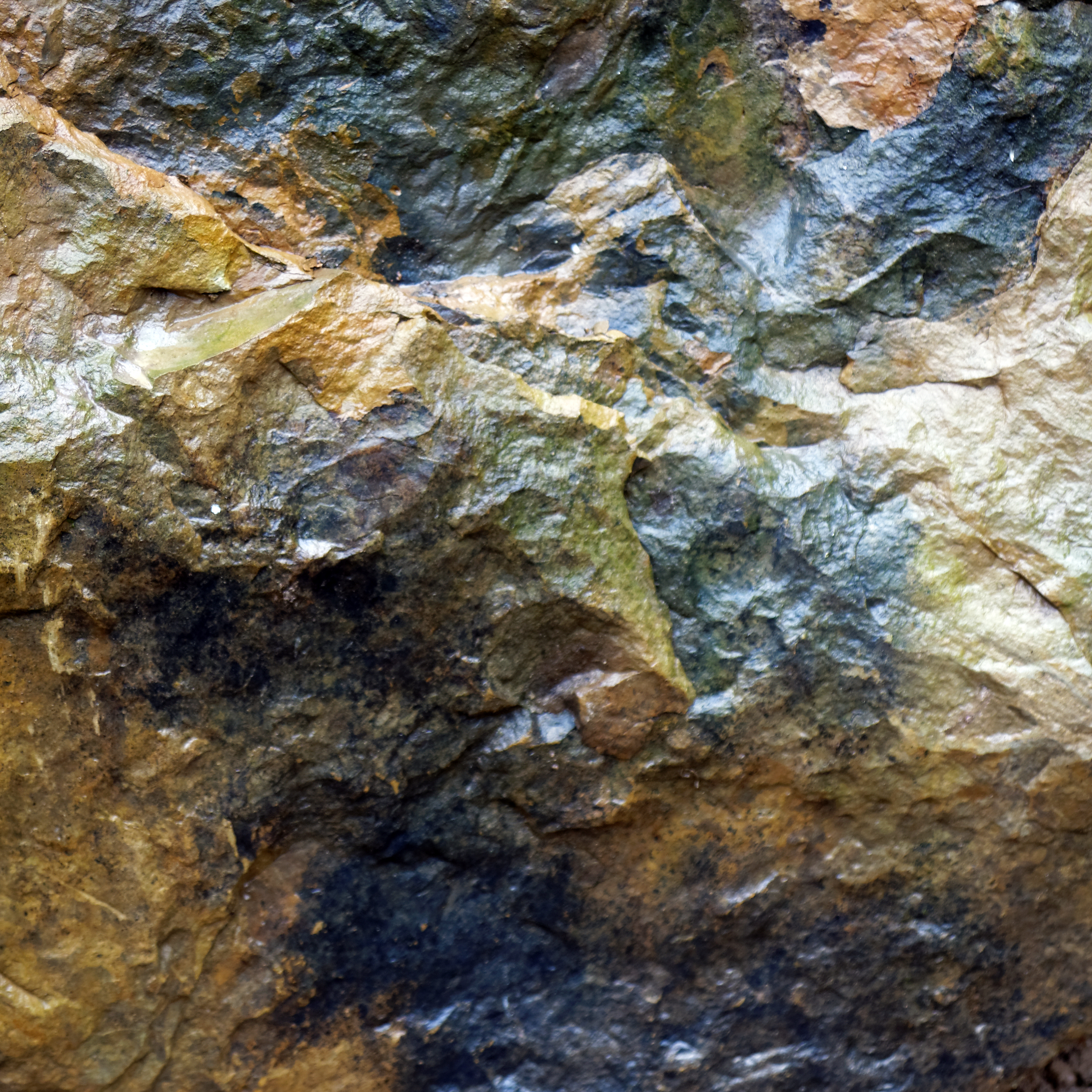
Horsham Stone

== Formation ==
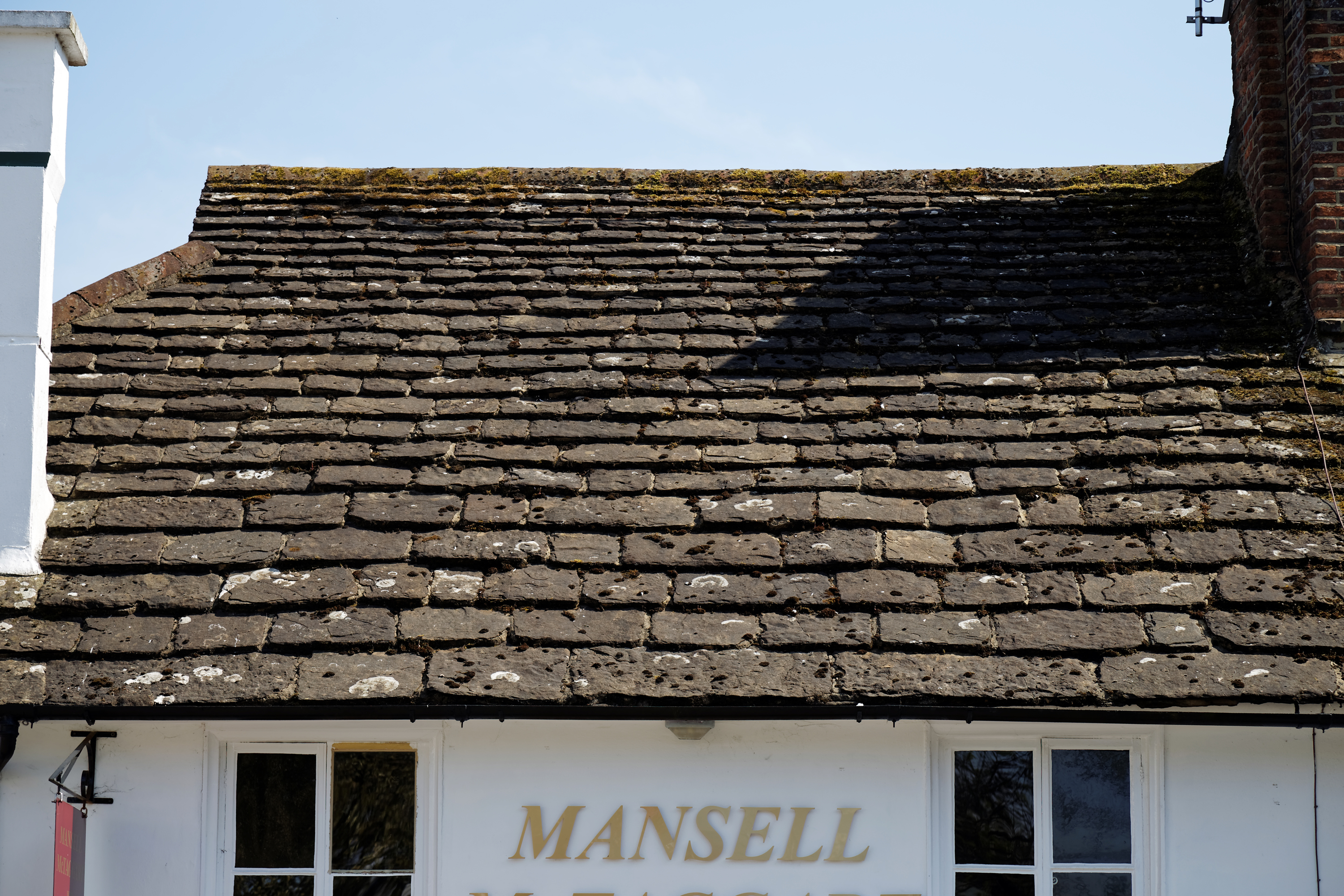
Horsham Stone tiled roof in the Carfax, Horsham

Sussex Stone and its limestone equivalent Sussex Marble were formed around 130 million years ago in the Lower Cretaceous period when Britain was quite different from the shape it is today. It is estimated that the latitude for Britain was approximately 30 degrees north of the equator. The fossil evidence in Horsham Stone and Sussex Marble indicate a diversity of life living on a broad, flat subtropical landscape. Towards the end of the Cretaceous period around 90 million years ago, most of Britain including Sussex would have been submerged beneath a tropical sea that was depositing chalk.

The sediments of the Wealden Basin were buried under hundreds of metres of further sediment over the next 100 million years and were then uplifted gradually by plate-tectonic movement and then eroded to expose Wealden rocks. Horsham Stone would have been visible to early settlers after the Ice Age around 12,000 years ago. When quarried, Horsham Stone could be extracted in "flat grey slabs of varying thickness".

== Uses of Horsham Stone ==
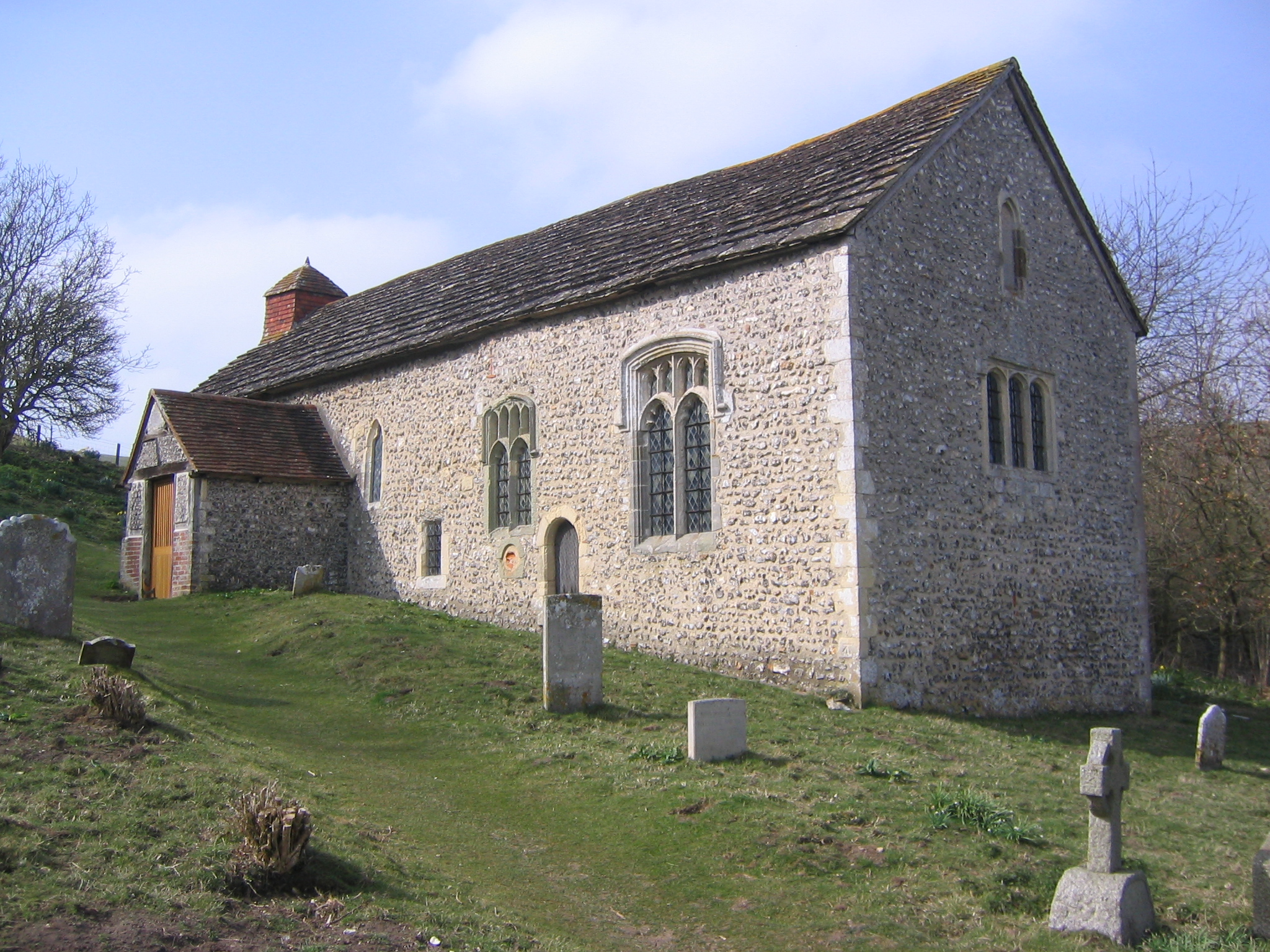
Coombes Church in West Sussex is roofed with Horsham Stone.

Horsham Stone has a long history of use. The earliest record is from the Bronze Age. Archeologists at Amberley found quern fragments made of Horsham Stone at Amberley Mount. It was used extensively by the Romans including in the construction of Stane Street. Villas such as Bignor and Fishbourne have examples of flooring and roof slates of the material.

In later centuries there are numerous examples in Sussex and the surrounding counties as a roofing material, particularly for mills, dovecotes, churches, manor houses and similar buildings. Completely rainproof and long-lasting, it was ideal for these structures. Smaller-scale uses include road surfaces, for which the thickest slabs were typically used: the footpaths leading to St Mary's Church at Shipley, the north wall of St Nicholas' Church at Itchingfield, and gravestones, fonts and tombs with examples at St Mary the Virgin's Church in Horsham and St George's Church, West Grinstead. Once exposed it hardens quickly and will last for hundreds of years. The characteristic ripple marks are retained. There are redundant quarry workings throughout Sussex but just one working quarry in 2024. Large quarries at Nuthurst, and Stammerham in Southwater, are no longer extant but others survive in isolated Wealden settings.

== Commercial use in the early 21st century ==
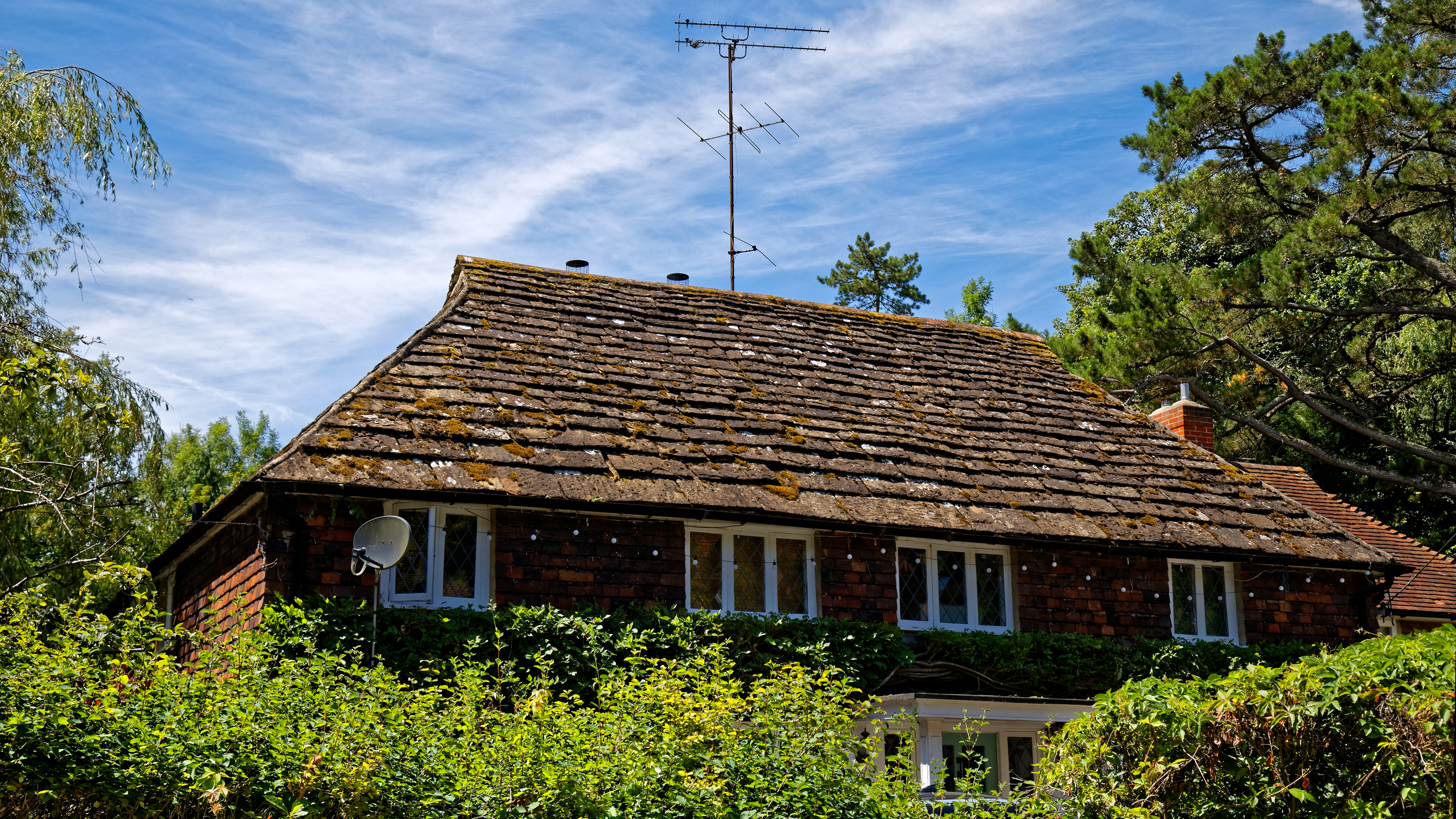
Cottage with Horsham stone roof in Nuthurst

Large-scale commercial extraction of Horsham stone had stopped by the 1880s and regular quarrying ceased completely in the 1930s with the closure of a small quarry at Nowhurst, Strood Green near Horsham. Purbeck Stone was regarded as a good substitute for Horsham Stone and repairs to stonework tended to substitute it for the more expensive and scarcer Horsham Stone. The Nowhurst quarry was reopened in 2004 by the Historic Horsham Stone Company. It produces roofing slates for the area's historic houses.

== See also ==
- List of sandstones
- Media related to Horsham Stone at Wikimedia Commons
