= Coombes =

Village and parish in West Sussex, England

Coordinates: 50°51′42″N 0°18′27″W

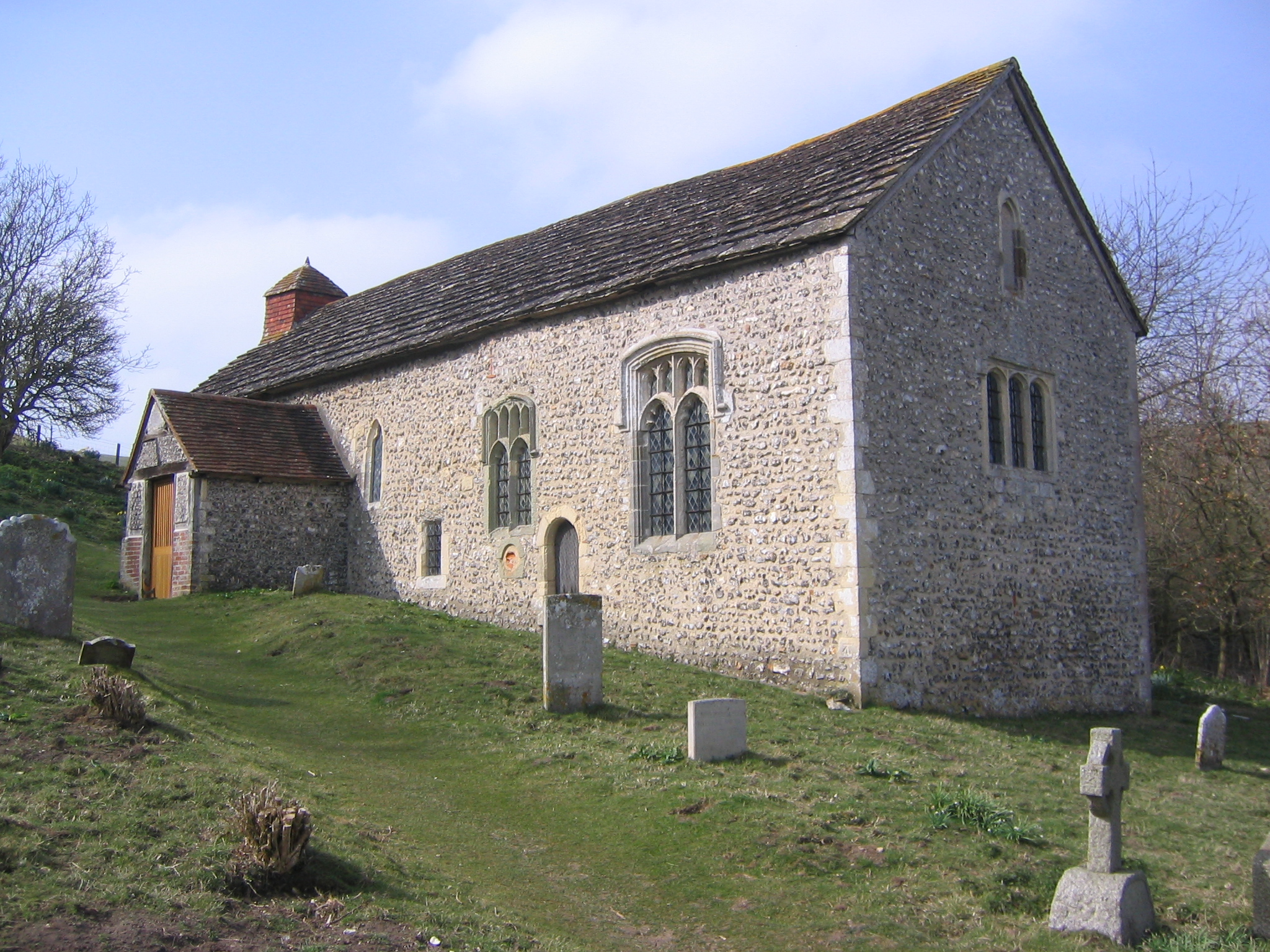
- Coombes parish church

- Location within West Sussex
- Area: 2.03 sq mi (5.3 km^{2})
- Population: 51 (2001 Census)
  - Density: 25/sq mi (9.7/km^{2})
- OS grid reference: TQ192083
  - London: 45 miles (72 km) N
- Civil parish: Coombes
- District: Adur
- Shire county: West Sussex
- Region: South East
- Country: England
- Sovereign state: United Kingdom
- Post town: Lancing
- Postcode district: BN15
- Dialling code: 01903
- Police: Sussex
- Fire: West Sussex
- Ambulance: South East Coast
- UK Parliament: East Worthing and Shoreham

Coombes is a small village and civil parish in the Adur District of West Sussex, England. The village is in the Adur Valley 2 miles (3.2 km) northwest of Shoreham-by-Sea.

Coombes Church is an 11th-century Church of England parish church that has lost its dedication. It has some of the most important medieval wall paintings in England, which were painted c. 1100. There is a single church bell that weighs about 77 pounds (35 kg) and was probably cast in Normandy. It is one of the oldest bells in Sussex, dated to c. 1150. The church is roofed with Horsham Stone slabs.

The civil parish has an area of 525.81 hectares (1,299 acres) and has a parish meeting rather than a parish council. The 2001 Census recorded a population of 51 people living in 22 households of whom 23 were economically active.

Church Farm is next to the parish church and Applesham Farm is about 0.6 miles (1 km) to the south.

== See also ==
- Coombs (disambiguation)
- Coombe (disambiguation)
