= Southwick =

Southwick may refer to:

== People ==
- Southwick (surname)

== Places ==
=== India ===
- Southwick, Ooty, a suburb of Ooty town in the state of Tamil Nadu

=== England ===
- Southwick, Hampshire (pronounced suth-ick), a village
- Southwick, Northamptonshire (pronounced suth-ick), a small village
- Southwick, a hamlet in the parish of Mark, Somerset
- Southwick, Sunderland, a suburb of the City of Sunderland, Tyne and Wear
- Southwick, West Sussex, a town in the Adur District
  - Southwick (electoral division), a West Sussex County Council constituency
  - Southwick Ship Canal
- Southwick, Wiltshire, a village near Trowbridge

=== Scotland ===
- Southwick, Dumfries and Galloway, see Colvend and Southwick, former parish in Dumfries and Galloway

=== United States ===
- Southwick, Massachusetts, a town in Hampden County

== Other uses ==
- Southwick angle in radiography
