= Southwick (surname) =

Southwick is a surname. Notable people with the surname include:

- Alfred P. Southwick (1826–1898), American inventor
- Cassandra Burnell Southwick (c.1600–1660), early American settler
- Clyde Southwick (1886–1961), American baseball player
- Dan Southwick, American musician
- Danny Southwick (born 1981), American football player
- David Southwick (born 1968), Australian politician
- Elisha Southwick (1809–1875), American tanner
- George N. Southwick (1863–1912), American politician
- Lawrence Southwick (c.1600–1660), early American settler
- Leslie H. Southwick (born 1950), American judge
- Shawn Southwick, wife of American television and radio host Larry King
- Solomon Southwick (1773–1839), New York newspaper publisher and politician
- Teresa Southwick, American writer
- Thankful Southwick (1792–1867), American Quaker, abolitionist, and women's rights activist
- Wayne Southwick (born 1923), American orthopedic surgeon
