= Drehmann sign =

Orthopedic clinical test for hip joints

Drehmann sign is a widely used test in orthopedics examining the functionality of the hip joint. Drehmann sign is positive if an unavoidable passive external rotation of the hip occurs when performing a hip flexion. In addition, an internal rotation of the respective hip joint is either not possible or accompanied by pain when forcefully induced. A positive Drehmann sign is a typical clinical feature in slipped capital femoral epiphysis (SCFE), the impingement syndrome of the acetabulum-hip or in osteoarthritis of the hip joint.

It was first described by the Breslau born German physician Gustav Drehmann (b. 1869, d. 1932).

== See also ==
- Klein's line
- Southwick angle
