= River Adur =

River in Sussex, England

Adur Beeding River, Bramber Water, Sore - all archaically
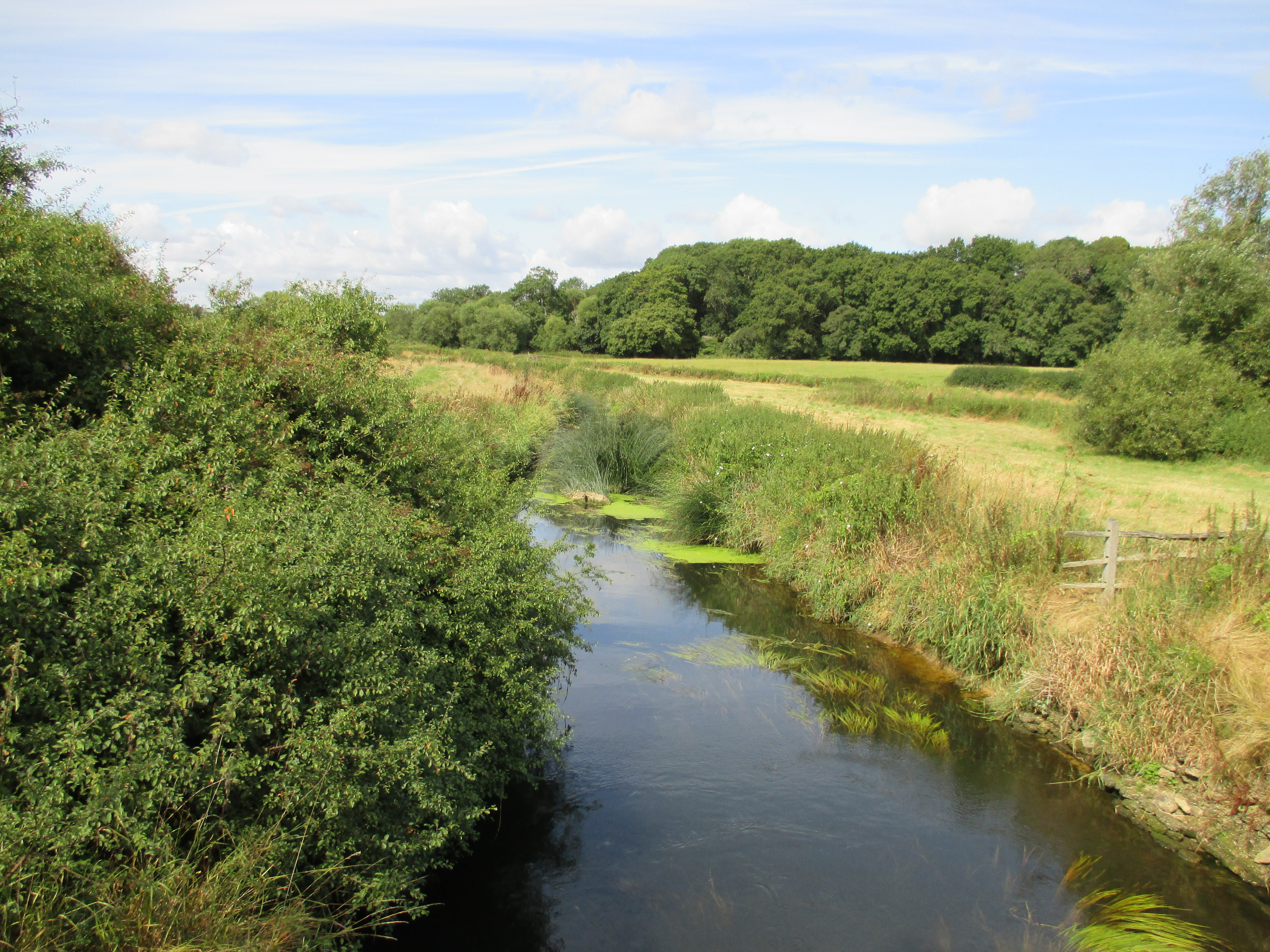
- The Adur, downstream from Wineham Bridge

Location
- Country: England
- Region: Sussex

Physical characteristics
- Source: Western Adur
  - location: Slinfold
- Mouth: English Channel
  - location: Shoreham-by-Sea
- Length: 20 mi (32 km)

Basin features
- Tributaries
  - left: Lancing Brook (near Shipley), Ladywell Stream
  - right: Cowfold Stream

The Adur (/ˈeɪdər/) is a river in Sussex, England; it gives its name to the Adur district of West Sussex. The river, which is 20 miles (32 km) long, was once navigable for large vessels up as far as Steyning, where there was a large Saxon port, but by the 11th century the lower river became silted up and the port moved down to the deeper waters at the mouth of the river in Shoreham-by-Sea.

== Course of river ==
The Adur begins as two separate branches, the western Adur and the eastern Adur, which meet 1.2 miles (2 km) west of Henfield.

The western Adur rises at Slinfold, from where it flows around Coolham and then through Shipley, where Hammer Pond and Lancing Brook join it on the right bank. On the left bank, it is joined by the outflow of Knepphill Pond, which forms part of the Knepp Castle pleasure grounds laid out by John Nash in 1806–13. He designed the present castellated mansion known as Knepp Castle for Sir Charles Merrick Burrell, but the grounds include the remains of an 11th-century castle, known by the same name, which was demolished in 1726. The pond was constructed as a hammer pond for the iron industry in the 16th century by the Duke of Norfolk. At Bay Bridge it is crossed by the A24 road, is joined by another tributary on the left bank, and flows on to West Grinstead, passing through the remains of a lock. It is joined by Blakes Gill just above Hatterell Bridge, where it passes through a large weir structure. There are the remains of another lock at Lock Bridge, Partridge Green, and Honeybridge Stream joins it on the right bank. Near Bines Green, Bines Bridge carries the B2135 road over the river, and the river is tidal below this point. Soon afterwards, it joins the eastern Adur near Henfield.

The eastern Adur rises at Ditchling Common, in East Sussex, from where it crosses into West Sussex and passes between Haywards Heath to the north and Burgess Hill to the south. It is crossed by the Brighton Main Line to the north of Wivelsfield railway station, the A273 road and the A23 road at Rice Bridge. To the west of Twineham (50.962746°N 0.235728°W) the Herrings Stream joins on the left bank. At Shermanbury, the eastern Adur is fed by the Cowfold Stream. The normal tidal limit is just below this at the footbridge near Shermanbury Church. The tidal section is crossed by the A281 road at Mock Bridge, and by the Downs Link, a long-distance footpath which follows the track of two railways, at Betley Bridge. Below Betley Bridge, a public towpath runs along the left bank of the river. There is a weir just above the confluence with the Western Adur, which means that only the highest tides reach Shermanbury. Up to the early 1800s boats could navigate to Mock Bridge, where the A281 crosses the Adur.

The combined flow continues southwards, to a footbridge near Eatons Farm, below which there is a towpath on both sides of the river. Bineham Bridge carries another footpath over the river, and the river then enters Henfield Levels, an important wetland site which supports large populations of birds. A former railway bridge carries the Downs Link over the river at Stretham Manor. There are a number of salterns to the east of the river, which were on the floodplain before the river was embanked in the post-medieval period. The land was periodically flooded by incoming tides, and water trapped in pools was then evaporated to extract salt. The industry operated from Anglo-Saxon times until the early 17th century, when it was unable to compete with sources of rock salt, mined in other parts of the country. Many of the middens were levelled in the 1960s, as the land was used for agriculture, but two important groups remain: one to the west of the river near Bramber, and the other to the east of the river near Upper Beeding. They are scheduled monuments, and those to the east are on land originally owned by Sele Priory, while those to the west were given to Durford Abbey around 1160, by William de Braose, who owned Bramber Castle.

Beeding Bridge carries a minor road from Upper Beeding to Bramber over the river, while a little further south, the A283 Steyning By-pass crosses. A footbridge carries the Downs Link over the river, as the former railway bridge near Coombes has been demolished. The river continues through a gap in the South Downs near Lancing College where the Adur is fed by the Ladywell Stream, and is then crossed by the A27 Shoreham By-pass. Further downstream is Old Shoreham Bridge, a Grade II* listed structure originally built in 1791. It is 500 feet (150 m) long, with 27 spans, and although it was largely reconstructed in the early 20th century, it is still of great interest, because it is probably the only one of its type which still exists. The towpaths end at Old Shoreham Bridge, and the river becomes part of Shoreham Harbour. The West Coastway Line railway bridge and the A259 Norfolk Bridge cross the river before it turns to the east, to flow parallel to the English Channel at Shoreham-by-Sea. A new swing footbridge was constructed in 2013, linking Shoreham to Shoreham Beach. Replacing a previous structure which was beyond economic repair, it cost £10 million and was opened by the Duke of Gloucester. It was named the Adur Ferry Bridge after a public vote was held. The river enters the English Channel at Shoreham. The mouth of the Adur is now two miles (3 km) from the town centre of Shoreham due to longshore drift. Previously, the river mouth was further east, in Portslade, but an opening to the sea was made which allowed the creation of Southwick Ship Canal.

The Baybridge Canal uses part of the Adur's watercourse.

== Etymology ==
The name Adur is a relatively recent (probably 1612s) invention, based on the name of the Roman fort Portus Adurni which was mistakenly believed to be at Shoreham. The river had previously been known as the Bramber, and was also recorded as the Sore in the sixteenth century, the latter probably a back-formation by William Harrison's Description of England (1577) from Shoreham (often Sorham in early sources).

A further possible translation derived from the Anglo Saxon ǣdr meaning vein or artery. Other local rivers such as the Rother deriving from the Anglo Saxon rōðer which means Rower (as in a long river) and the Arun derived from hærn meaning tidal also appear to describe the river and its surrounds.

== History ==
From Norman times the county of Sussex was divided into sections known as rapes. Each rape was typically centred on a river and river port and was guarded by a castle. Bramber rape was centred on the port of Bramber and the river Adur, with Bramber Castle located close to the river. At various times in the medieval period, Bramber, Steyning and New Shoreham were all major ports on the river. The western Adur also flows close to Knepp Castle, near Shipley.

The river has a long history of use for navigation, and Shoreham is known to have been used as a port since Roman times. During the Middle Ages, it was especially active, as it was the location of a Royal Arsenal, and later became a centre for ship building. During the 11th and 12th centuries, the river was tidal as far upstream as Bramber Bridge, and Bramber was a busy port. When Defoe visited in the 1720s, he noted that Shoreham was a seafaring town, with many of the inhabitants being ship's carpenters, chandlers or otherwise involved in trades connected with shipbuilding. At the time, the hinterland was able to supply large quantities of cheap timber, and although larger ships could not navigate up the river, it was used to float large rafts of timber from Bramber, Steyning and beyond down to the ship yards. This trade gradually declined as the forests were felled.

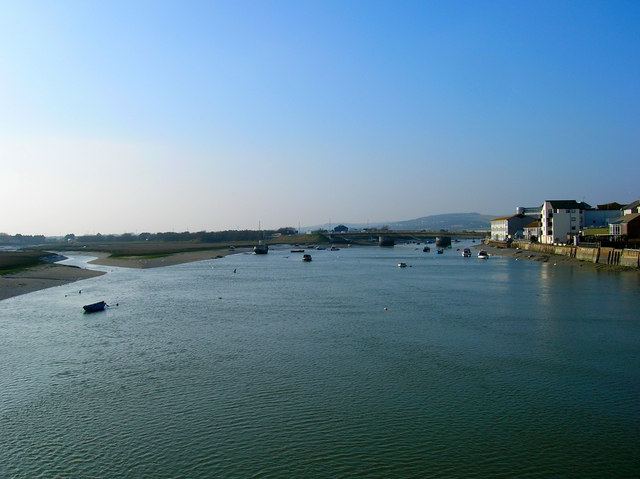
River Adur at Shoreham-by-Sea, view towards Norfolk Bridge

One problem that the shipbuilders faced was the blocking of the mouth of the river with shingle, which was moved along the coast by the tides. Harbour Commissioners were appointed in 1760 to resolve the issue, and two attempts to create a new mouth were made, but neither was particularly successful. However, in 1816 a new channel was cut through the shingle, and the original course of the river became the Southwick Ship Canal as development work took place over the next forty years. Water levels in the canal are maintained by locks at its entrance.

River Adur Navigation and Drainage Act 1807
- Act of Parliament
- Parliament of the United Kingdom
- Long title: An Act for improving the Navigation of a certain Part of the River Adur; and for the better draining the Low Lands lying in the Levels above Beeding Bridge, and below Mock Bridge and Bines Bridge, all in the County of Sussex.
- Citation: 47 Geo. 3 Sess. 2. c. cxvii

Dates
- Royal assent: 13 August 1807

Following the success of improvements to a number of rivers along the south coast, the River Adur Navigation and Drainage Act 1807 (47 Geo. 3 Sess. 2. c. cxvii) was obtained on 13 August 1807 to allow the river to be improved up to Bines Bridge on the western Adur and to Mock Bridge on the eastern Adur. The Act also authorised the drainage of the lowland levels above Breeding Bridge to be improved. Seventy-nine trustees were appointed by the Act to carry out the work, assisted by the Commissioners of Sewers for the Rape of Bramber. Finance for the scheme would come from rates levied on owners of land which would benefit from the new drainage scheme. The river channel was dredged, the banks were raised, and a towpath was constructed. The river was to be made suitable for barges drawing 3 feet (0.9 m) of water, and tolls for the use of the river as specified by the act were very low, but the work was completed, and a navigable depth of 4 feet (1.2 m) was achieved.

A further extension to the navigable river was made in 1825, when seven promoters raised £5,250 and obtained an act of Parliament, the Baybridge Canal Act 1825 (6 Geo. 4. c. clxiv), to construct the Baybridge Canal, although in practice they widened the river channel and straightened out a few of the bends, rather than constructing a separate channel. The canal ran from Bines Bridge to Baybridge at West Grinstead, and included two pound locks, each with a rise of 7 feet (2.1 m). Although the 1807 Act had not authorised the construction of any locks, at some point three flash locks were constructed, one on the eastern Adur at Betley Lock, just above the junction with the western Adur, and two on the western branch.

The river was never a commercial success. Tolls in 1812 amounted to £523, but then declined fairly quickly, and were only £258 in 1839. The Brighton Railway arrived in the area in 1861, when a branch from Shoreham to Horsham was constructed, which was in direct competition to the river. The Adur trustees could no longer afford to repay their loans from 1865, while the Baybridge Canal was virtually unused from 1861, and officially closed on 1 September 1875. Some traffic continued to use the Adur, and in 1905 a tug with barges conveyed 12,989 tons of material from Shoreham to a cement works at Beeding. This trade continued until 1929.

The lower reaches of the river, from its mouth to Old Shoreham Bridge, are managed by the Port of Shoreham Harbour Office. Above the bridge, the river is the responsibility of the Environment Agency. There is a Common Law right of navigation up to Shermanbury; small boats can reach there on the eastern branch, and can also reach the lower lock of the Baybridge Canal at Partridge Green on the western branch. Careful timing is required, as the river drains down to a narrow channel at low tide, and Beeding Bridge has extremely limited headroom on spring tides.

== Railway engine ==
The South Eastern and Chatham Railway named one of their K class 2-6-4T tank engines no. A791 (later no. 1791 and 31791) River Adur after this river.

== Settlements on the river ==
- Slinfold
- Shipley
- West Grinstead
- Ditchling
- Twineham
- Wineham
- Shermanbury
- Bramber
- Upper Beeding
- Coombes
- Shoreham-by-Sea

== See also ==
- Rivers of the United Kingdom

== Bibliography ==
- Burridge, Frank (1975). Nameplates of the Big Four. Oxford: Oxford Publishing Company. ISBN 978-0-902888-43-2.
- Cumberlidge, Jane (2009). Inland Waterways of Great Britain (8th Ed.). Imray Laurie Norie and Wilson. ISBN 978-1-84623-010-3.
- Defoe, Daniel (2018) [1727]. A Tour Through the Whole Island of Great Britain. Global Grey.
- Hadfield, Charles (1969). The Canals of South and South-East England. David and Charles. ISBN 978-0-7153-4693-8.
- Priestley, Joseph (1831). "Historical Account of the Navigable Rivers, Canals and Railways of Great Britain". Archived from the original on 3 March 2016.
