= St Peter's Church, Henfield =

St Peter's Church
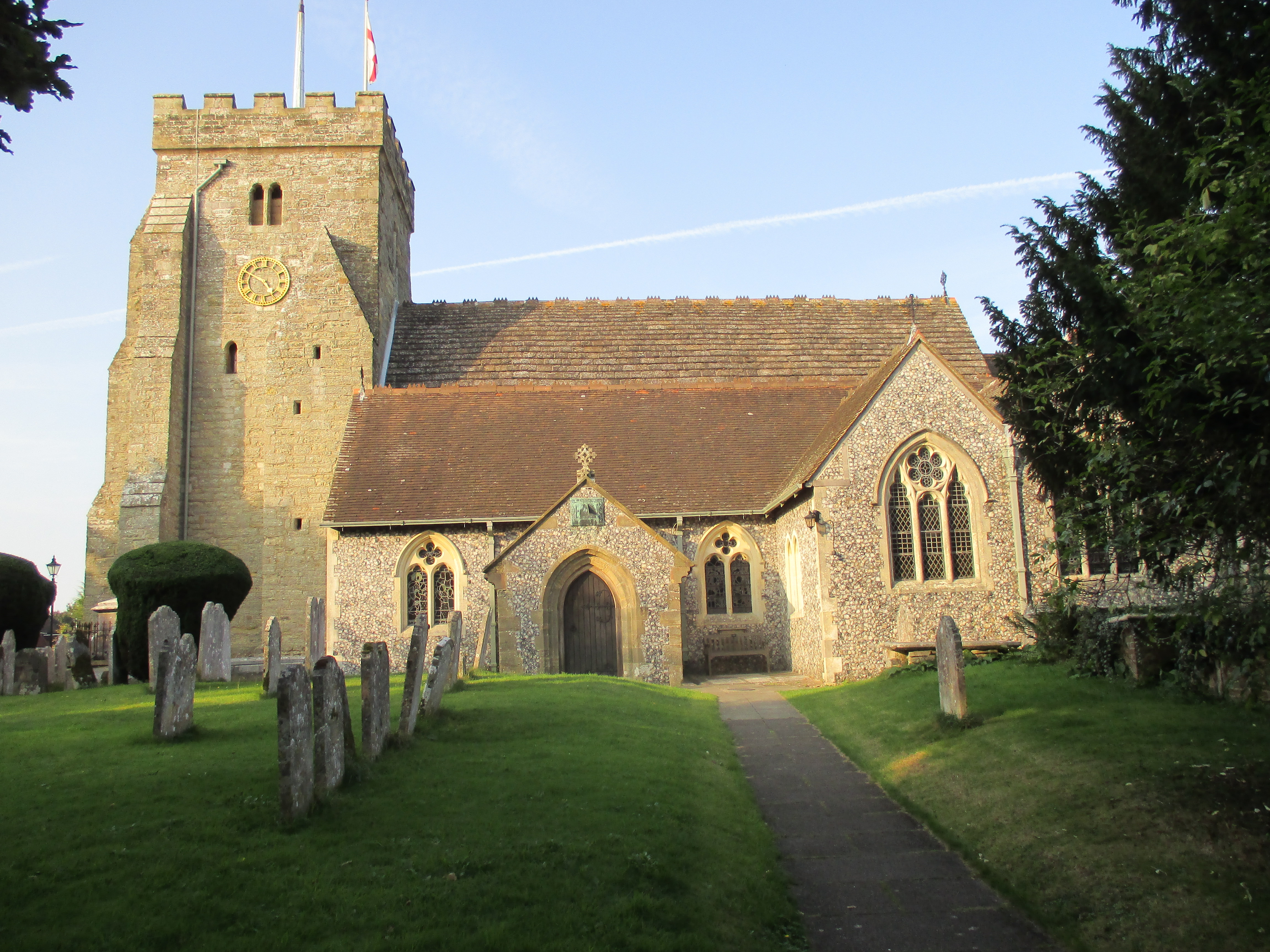
- The church from the south
- St Peter's Church
- 50.9323°N 0.2764°W
- Location: Church Lane, Henfield, West Sussex, BN5 9NY
- Country: England
- Denomination: Church of England
- Website: henfield.org

History
- Status: Parish church
- Founded: 770
- Dedication: Saint Peter

Architecture
- Functional status: Active
- Heritage designation: Grade II*
- Designated: 15 March 1955
- Years built: Early 13th century

Administration
- Province: Canterbury
- Diocese: Chichester
- Archdeaconry: Horsham
- Deanery: Rural Deanery of Hurst
- Parish: Henfield

Clergy
- Vicar: [Currently vacant]

St Peter's Church is a Church of England parish church in the large village of Henfield, West Sussex. Placed on the site of an 8th-century Saxon church also dedicated to St Peter, it was built in the 13th, 14th and 15th centuries, but was heavily restored and partially rebuilt in the 19th century. English Heritage has listed it at Grade II* for its architectural and historical importance. Services for the parish continue and also cover the parishes of St Giles', Shermanbury and St. Peter's, Woodmancote, which form its united benefice.

== History ==
The ground of the parish of Henfield is mostly composed of Weald clay, but towards the centre of the parish are low ridges of plateau gravel lying on Lower Greensand. On one of these, near the old road that ran from Eatons, near Ashurst, to Hurstpierpoint, stands the church of St Peter, rather to the north-west of most of the village's older buildings. The first St. Peter's Church, probably built on the same spot, was founded by thegn Waerbald and his wife Tidburg, to whom Osmund, king of Sussex, granted 15 hides of land for that purpose in the year 770. It has been suggested that this church was a minster, i.e. that it held a community of clergymen, but this remains a disputed point.

The 15 hides granted by Osmund can presumably be identified with the lands which appear after the Conquest as Stretham (or Henfield) manor, Oreham manor, Henfield park, and the rectory estate. The early history of Stretham manor, consisting of the church itself and most of the southern and central parts of Henfield parish along with outlying parts in neighbouring parishes, shows the close connection between St Peter's, Henfield and its bishops. By 1066 Stretham manor was the property of the bishopric of Selsey, and in 1086 Domesday Book records it as belonging to the bishopric of Chichester (to which the see had been moved in 1075). The bishops of Chichester kept a house on this estate which in the later Middle Ages served as Henfield's main courthouse. A farmhouse comprising one wing of the original house still survives under the name Stretham Manor. A vicarage was ordained in 1219, by which date the rectory had become a prebend of Chichester Cathedral, further strengthening the links between St Peter's and its see.

The Saxon church survived at least as late as Domesday Book, but nothing now remains of it. Perhaps around 1200–1220, and certainly no later than 1250, it had been replaced by a simple nave and chancel built of Caen stone, a kind of Middle Jurassic limestone quarried in Normandy. The chancel arch from this building can still be seen, as can two lancet windows in what is now the vestry. Two aisles to north and south were built later in the 13th century, and in the 14th century the porch and the arches separating the nave from the aisles were added. There was much further building in the 15th century: the tower, a westward extension of the nave, and north of the chancel a new chapel, known as the Parham chapel. This last may have been the work of Thomas Beckington, Prebendary of Henfield from 1438 to 1443. In 1530 the dedication of the church, which is usually given as being to St Peter, was recorded as being to Sts Peter and Paul. In 1627 two dormer windows were added to the north aisle; those in the south aisle are of uncertain date but may be from the same period. A gallery on the south side of the church is recorded as being in place in 1718.

St Peter's and one of its churchwardens featured in a court case in 1607 involving the theft of a bell from St Leonard's Church, Aldrington, a parish church a few miles away. Aldrington parish was then depopulated and the church was ruinous, and arrangements were made to sell its bell. Although this arrived at St Peter's, "it did not travel to Henfield with the consent of the Aldrington parishioners": the churchwarden admitted helping to steal it, and "the authorities at Henfield Church admitted that they had received 650 pounds (290 kg) of bell material" which was used to cast a new bell for the tower. They agreed to pay compensation of £16.5s. to Aldrington parish.

The 19th century saw extensive rebuilding of the fabric of the church. First of all the south aisle, which had been said to be badly out of repair as early as 1637, was replaced before 1833 at the expense of the notable botanist William Borrer, a local resident, and a gallery was included for the use of schoolchildren. In 1855 the tower was restored by an unknown architect. In 1870 and 1871 a large-scale restoration was undertaken to the designs of the architects William Slater and Richard Carpenter. Most of the walls were refaced with flint, the chancel was lengthened eastward and raised in height, a new south chancel chapel was built, both aisles were entirely rebuilt, the roof of the nave was opened up and new clerestory lancet windows installed.

St Peter's Church was designated a Grade II* listed building on 15 March 1955. Such buildings are defined as being "particularly important ... [and] of more than special interest". In February 2001, it was one of 54 Grade II* listed buildings, and 1,028 listed buildings of all grades, in the district of Mid Sussex. In 2008 a new stone floor was laid, under-floor heating installed, and the 19th-century pews were replaced with chairs.

== Related buildings ==
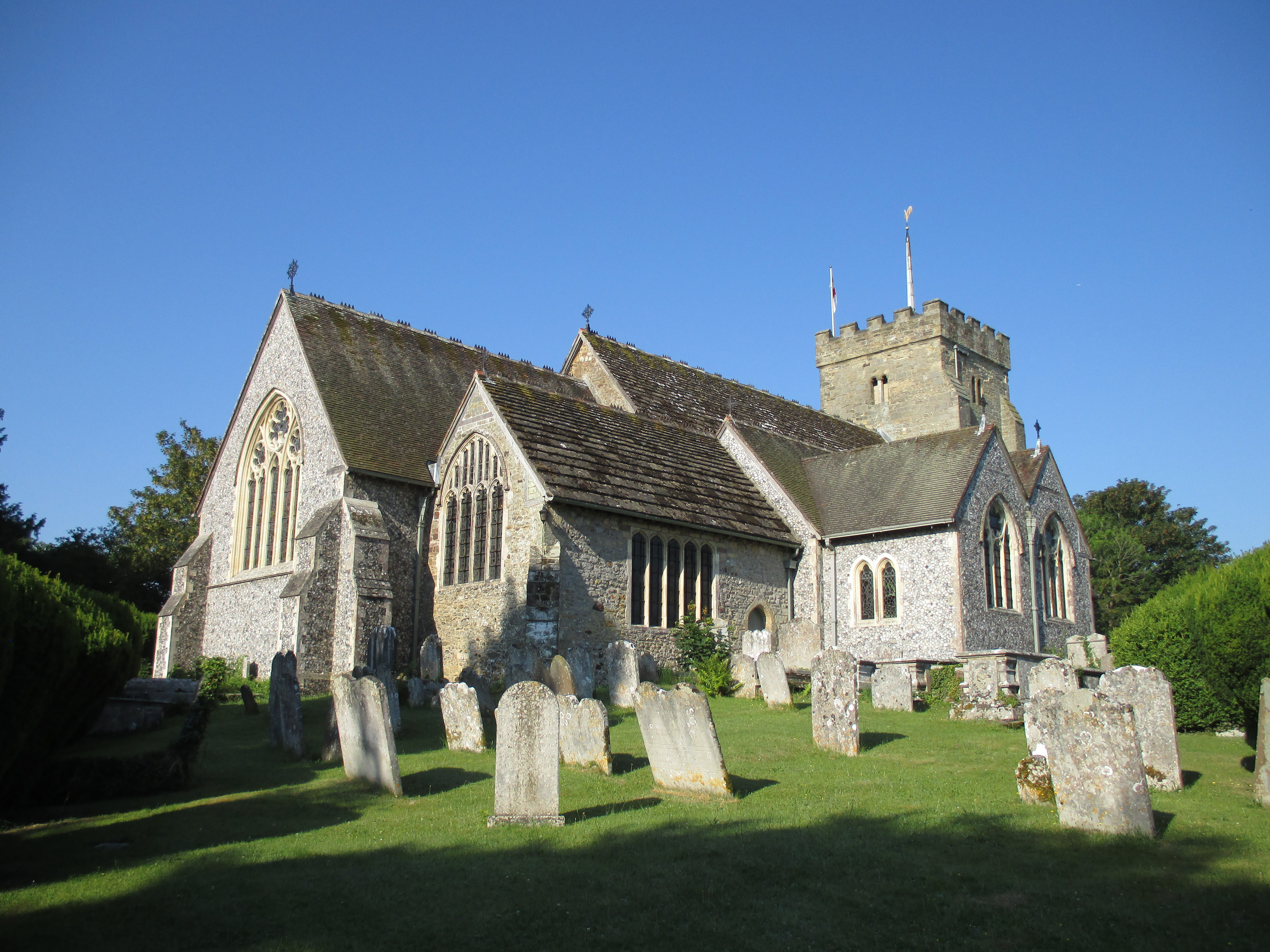
Seen from the north-east

The prebend is recorded in 1341 as consisting of a house and garden with 60 acres of land. About 1520 it became the property of the diocese, but a few years later in 1533 it was leased for 80 years to Thomas Bishop, lawyer to Bishop Robert Sherburne. From him the lease passed first to his son Sir Thomas Bishop, then to the second Thomas's younger son Henry Bishop, Postmaster General of England, who was temporarily deprived of it during the Commonwealth period. Parsonage House, the successor of the original prebend house, was built in the 16th century or earlier but was refronted in the 18th century; it still stands in Church Street.

A vicarage house appears in documents of 1481, 1529, 1636 and 1724, but the present vicarage was built c. 1806 and enlarged c. 1850.

In 1812 a church school for boys was opened in Henfield. Its successor, St Peter's Church of England Primary School, occupies buildings on the north-west edge of the village which were built in 1957 and extended in 1983.

An iron mission room capable of seating 60 was built on Oreham Common in 1891, but, services there being very badly attended, it was demolished before 1909.

== Architecture and fittings ==
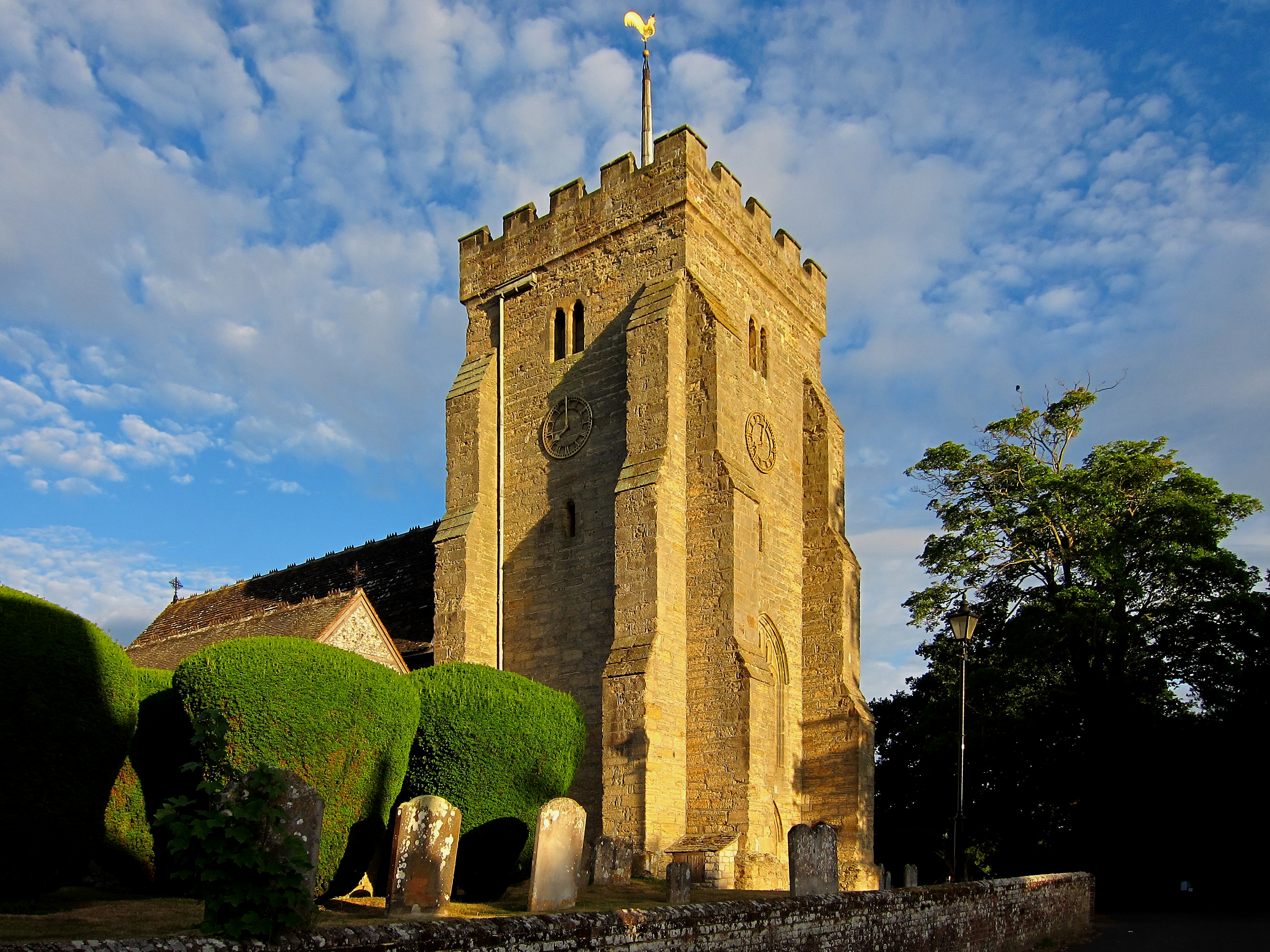
The church tower and some of the churchyard's 104 clipped yews

The church of St Peter as it stands today consists of a nave with north and south aisles and transepts, a chancel flanked by a chapel to the north and a vestry to the south, a porch and a tower. The nave dates from the 13th century, though whether early or late is disputed. The chancel arch, though 13th century, was rebuilt in the 19th. The aisles and chancel are products of the 1870–1871 restoration. The 15th-century Parham chapel is remarkable for its east window, a lovely example of the Gothic style of Henry VI's reign. The tower is in a rather austere version of the Perpendicular style, "as grim", Pevsner says, "as it would be in Northumberland".

During the restoration work of 1870–1871 some murals were uncovered, the most interesting of which, found on the church's north wall, was on a heraldic subject. Medieval murals are quite common in Sussex churches, but this one was dated as late as 1694. There was also formerly a painting of the Decalogue, Creed and Lord's Prayer with cherubs and angels, dating from 1897, which hung in the Parham chapel until the 1950s.

The church's notable fittings include an octagonal font, dated variously to the early 13th century or to the 15th century, a 14th-century iron-bound chest, and, in the Parham chapel, a reredos carved by Frank Ernest Howard with figures of the patron saints of the four countries of the United Kingdom. The chapel screen, in the arch between the Parham chapel and the north aisle, was executed by Frances E. Allen in 1969, but it incorporates 15th-century work. There are eight 18th-century bells, said to give "one of the best rings in the county". The plate is of a similar date, consisting of a salver (1704), flagon (1732), chalice (1733), and two patens and an almsdish (1753). The modern kneelers illustrate in tapestry the animal and plant life of Henfield parish in almost 300 different designs.

There are two brasses. One, in the vestry, shows Ann Kenwellmersh (d. 1633) with her hand on the head of her nine-year-old grandson Menelab Rainsford (d. 1627). The other, in the Parham chapel, is of Thomas Bishop (d. 1559), the first of the family to lease the rectory. Also in the Parham chapel is a monument to Thomas's grandson Henry Bishop, the Postmaster General. Two memorial tablets inside the church, on the right as you walk through the door from the porch, name the 60 men of the parish who died in the First World War, and the 14 who died in the Second World War.

== Stained glass ==
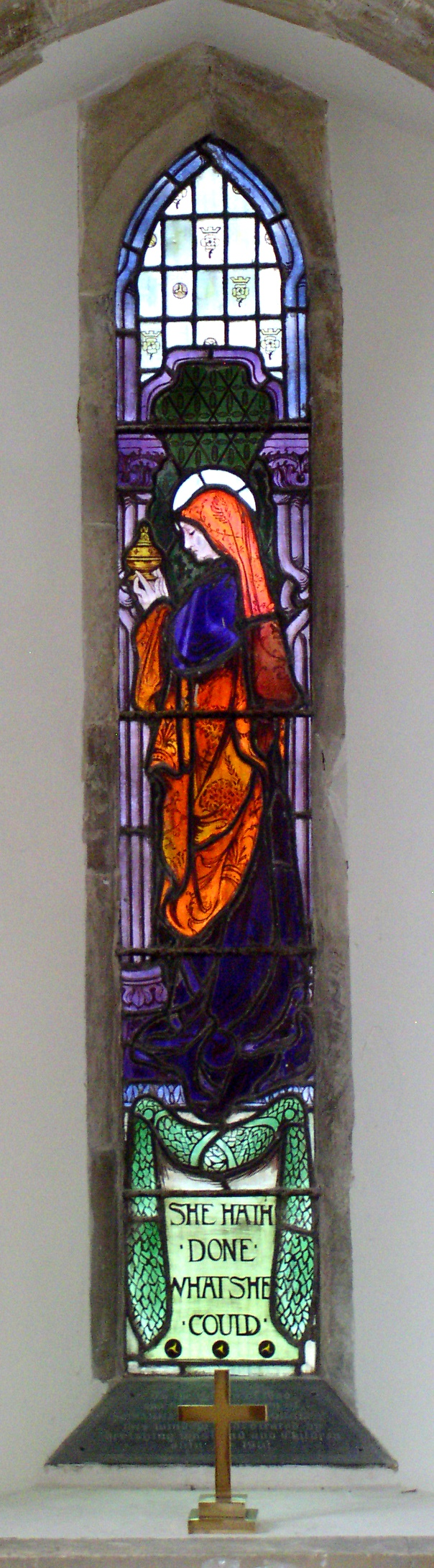
The Mary Magdalene window

St Peter's Church is notable for the quality of its stained glass, which includes work by some of the best-known designers in late 19th-century and early 20th-century England. In the north aisle the second window, depicting Fortitude and Charity, was produced c. 1907 by the firm of James Powell and Sons, and the first window (St Luke and St Paul) was designed by the Sussex artist Charles Eamer Kempe in 1903. The north transept's north window was made in 1928 by Kempe and Co after Kempe's death; its east window (Madonna and Child, and St Nicholas with children) by Frederick Charles Eden, a Brighton man, in 1935. In the Parham chapel, the north window is full of local interest, its five lights depicting Lancelot Andrewes, St Richard of Chichester, St Peter (the dedicatee of the church), St Wilfrid (whom Gibbon called the Apostle of Sussex), and St Augustine of Canterbury. It was produced by Kempe and Co in 1920. The chapel's east window, in four lights, is a 1921 work by Geoffrey Fuller Webb. It shows the Captain of the Host of the Lord appearing to Joshua before Jericho (Joshua 5:13–15), and St John the Divine writing about the Holy City.

Between the chapel and the chancel are glass windows engraved with agricultural scenes, which were installed in 1969. The five-light east window of the chancel was designed by Kempe in 1874 or 1875, and shows a Nativity scene, the Crucifixion, and several saints. In the vestry, which is kept locked, is a striking, quasi-Art Nouveau depiction of Mary Magdalene over the text "She hath done what she could" (Mark 14:8). It was produced by Lowndes and Drury, to a design attributed by one authority to Mary Lowndes, by another to Isobel Lilian Gloag. According to the art historian Peter Cormack it was designed by Gloag and painted by Lowndes.

An adjoining office, also locked, has the oldest stained glass in the church, a depiction of Jesus preaching the Sermon on the Mount installed in 1872. Its style suggests it is the work of Clayton and Bell. The three-light south transept window (St Oswald, St George and St Edmund) is by Kempe and Co, 1916. The south aisle's first window by Charles Eamer Kempe, 1898, shows the Annunciation. The second window, designed by Mary Lowndes and produced by James Powell and Sons in 1891, is on the theme "Suffer the little children to come unto me" (Mark 10:14). Finally the west window, which is not accessible to the public, depicts St Michael, St George and St Raphael. It was made in 1896 and is once again the work of Charles Eamer Kempe.

== Today ==
Since 1978 St Peter's, Henfield has formed part of the united benefice of Henfield with Shermanbury and Woodmancote, but it remains a distinct parish. The parish is served by a vicar, an assistant priest and an assistant curate. Holy Communion is celebrated on Sunday at 10.00 a.m., sometimes with the Book of Common Prayer liturgy and sometimes with Common Worship, except on the first Sunday of every month when there is a family-friendly service without Communion. There are also sometimes services earlier on Sunday morning, and at 6.30 on Sunday evening. Holy Communion is celebrated on Wednesday at 10.30 a.m. and on Thursday at 7.15 p.m., and services are regularly conducted in two local care homes. The church is open to visitors every day from 8.00 a.m. to 6.00 p.m.

== See also ==
- Grade II* listed buildings in West Sussex
- List of places of worship in Horsham District

== Works cited ==
- Allen, John (2017). "Henfield – St Peter". Sussex Parish Churches.
- [Anon.] (n.d.). "Stained Glass Windows at St Peter, Henfield, Sussex". Church Stained Glass Windows.
- [Anon.] (2017). "St Peter's, Henfield". A Church Near You. The Archbishops' Council.
- Barwick, Alan (2017). "St Peter's Church, Henfield". The Parish Magazine. Henfield Hub. Archived from the original on 14 August 2017.
- Hudson, T. P., ed. (1987). The Victoria History of the County of Sussex. Volume 6, Part 1: Bramber Rape (North-Eastern Part) Including Crawley New Town. Oxford: Oxford University Press for the Institute of Historical Research. ISBN 0197227686.
- Mee, Arthur (1971) [1964]. Linnell, C. L. S. (ed.). Sussex. The King's England. London: Hodder and Stoughton. ISBN 0340001054.
- Middleton, Judy (1979). A History of Hove. Chichester: Phillimore & Co. ISBN 0-85033-325-3.
- Middleton, Judy (2003). The Encyclopaedia of Hove & Portslade. Brighton: Brighton & Hove Libraries.
- Nairn, Ian; Pevsner, Nikolaus (1973) [1965]. Sussex. The Buildings of England. Harmondsworth: Penguin. ISBN 0140710280.
- Pé, Diana (2006). Mid Sussex Church Walks. PP (Pé Publishing). ISBN 0954369025.
- Turner, Edward (1871). "Archaeological Miscellanies". Sussex Archaeological Collections. 23. doi:10.5284/1086634.
- Whiteman, Ken; Whiteman, Joyce (1994). Ancient Churches of Sussex. Brighton: Roedale. ISBN 0952256002.
