= SCFE =

SCFE may refer to:

- Slipped capital femoral epiphysis, a medical term
- South Central Florida Express, a railroad
