= St Giles' Church, Shermanbury =

St Giles' Church
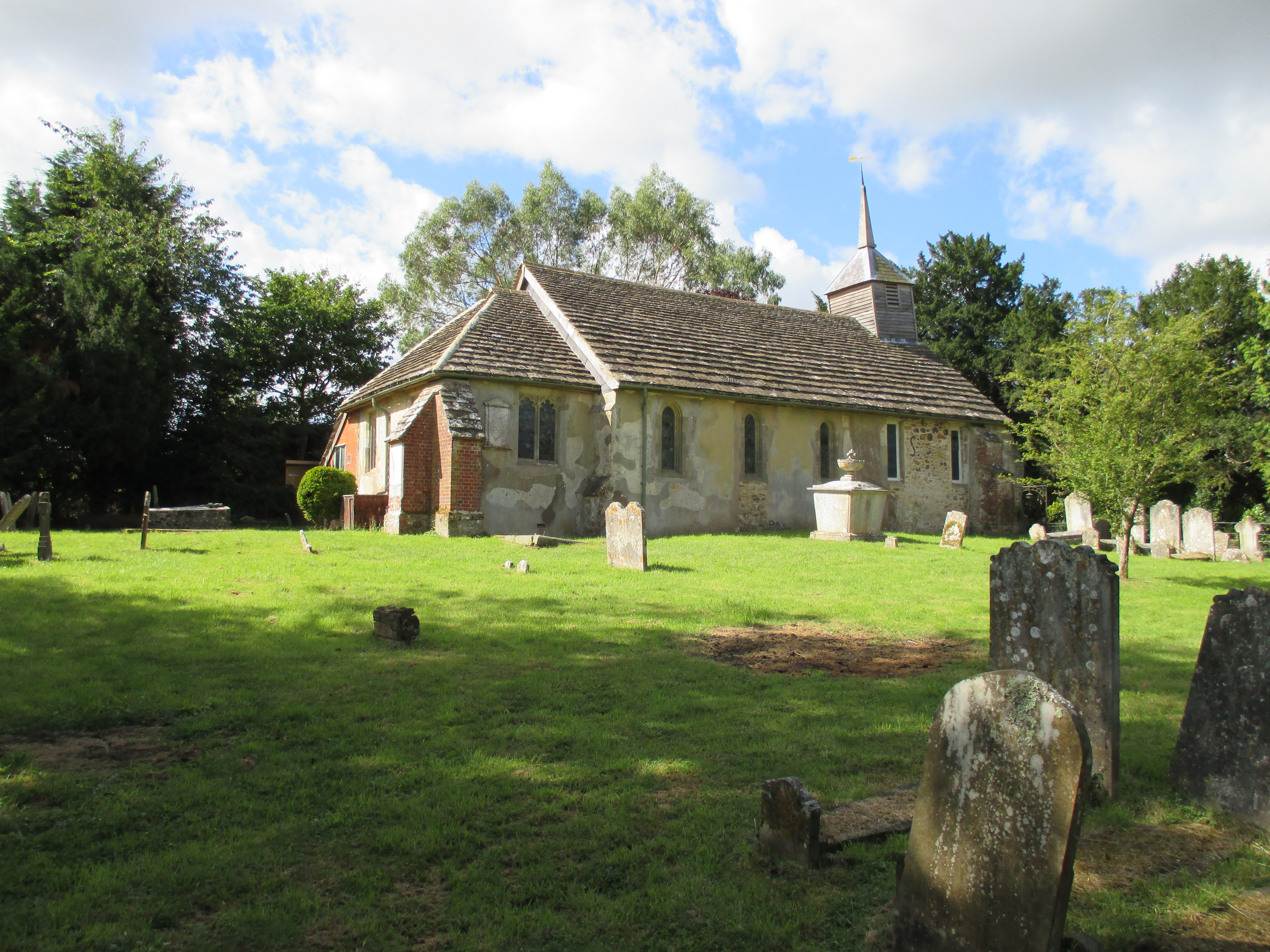
- The church seen from the north east
- St Giles' Church
- 50.95615°N 0.27257°W
- Location: Brighton Road, Shermanbury, West Sussex, RH13 8HF
- Country: England
- Denomination: Church of England
- Website: henfield.org

History
- Status: Parish church
- Dedication: Saint Giles

Architecture
- Functional status: Active
- Heritage designation: Grade II*
- Designated: 15 March 1955
- Years built: 13th century

Administration
- Province: Canterbury
- Diocese: Chichester
- Archdeaconry: Horsham
- Deanery: Rural Deanery of Hurst
- Parish: Shermanbury

Clergy
- Vicar: Currently vacant

St Giles' Church is a Church of England parish church in the small village of Shermanbury, West Sussex. Placed on the same site as a church recorded in Domesday Book, the present church was largely built in the 13th century but was heavily restored and partially rebuilt in the 18th and 19th centuries. English Heritage has listed it at Grade II* for its architectural and historical importance. The church historian John E. Vigar described it as "one of our Sussex gems" which he had "no hesitation in recommending...to all". Services for the parish continue and also cover the parishes of St Peter's, Henfield and St. Peter's, Woodmancote, which form its united benefice.

== Location ==
St Giles' Church has a picturesque setting alongside Shermanbury Place and its parkland, on a low rise above the flood plain of the eastern River Adur. The Adur and the old and new channels of its tributary the Cowfold Stream combine to entirely surround the church with water. It stands on a private road which is also a public bridleway, and is about half a mile from the nearest public road, the A281, between Henfield and Cowfold.

== History ==
The mound on which the church and Shermanbury Place stands was doubtless also the site of the Anglo-Saxon burh, or fortification, which gives the village the second half of its name. The existence of an ecclesiola, or small church, at Salmonesberie in 1086 is mentioned by Domesday Book. Some 12th-century carved stones discovered c. 1900 may have been from this church, but the oldest parts of the present structure date from the 13th century. By 1288 it had a rector, presented by Robert de Buci in his capacity as lord of the manor of Shermanbury. Later lords of the manor continued to hold the advowson until the 20th century. St Giles was never a good living, being valued at £4 6s. 8d. in 1291 and £4 19s. 3d. clear in 1535. In 1341 the glebe consisted of a house, a garden and 16 acres of arable land.

At various points in the 16th and 17th centuries the rector is known to have been an absentee. In 1586, and again in the 1670s, the church is recorded to have been ill-furnished, but matters seem to have improved under the long-term resident rectorships of Richard Ward, 1677–1706, and John Bear, 1711–62. Ward undertook a restoration of the chancel, and there was further restoration work in 1710 and 1747. The church was said in 1724 to be in a more decent condition than was common. In 1751 the classical scholar John Burton visited the church and gave a critical account of the performance of church music in the services: "[T]hey sing psalms, by preference, not set to the old and simple tune, but as if in a tragic chorus, changing about with strophe and antistrophe and stanzas, with good measure, but yet there is something offensive to my ears, when they bellow to excess, and bleat out some goatish noise with all their might."

The rectory was described as "old, mean, and dilapidated" in 1831, so a replacement, now known as Waterperry House, was built on Frylands Lane between 1837 and 1839. By 1835 a Sunday school had been established which met in the church, teaching 65 children. In 1837 the parish's tithes were commuted for £387. In the census held on Sunday, 30 March 1851 143 parishioners are recorded to have attended service in the morning, and 170 in the afternoon. St Giles was restored once more in 1885. Burials in the church graveyard were discontinued in 1888, and it was replaced by a new cemetery with a small brick chapel on Frylands Lane. In 1891 an iron mission room was built on the north-eastern boundary of the parish in Wineham; it was demolished around 1947. During the Second World War Waterperry House was requisitioned, and a new rectory was built a little to the north which remained in use in that capacity until 1978. On 15 March 1955 the church was given Grade II* listed building status, indicating that it is one of this country's "particularly important buildings of more than special interest".

== Architecture and fittings ==
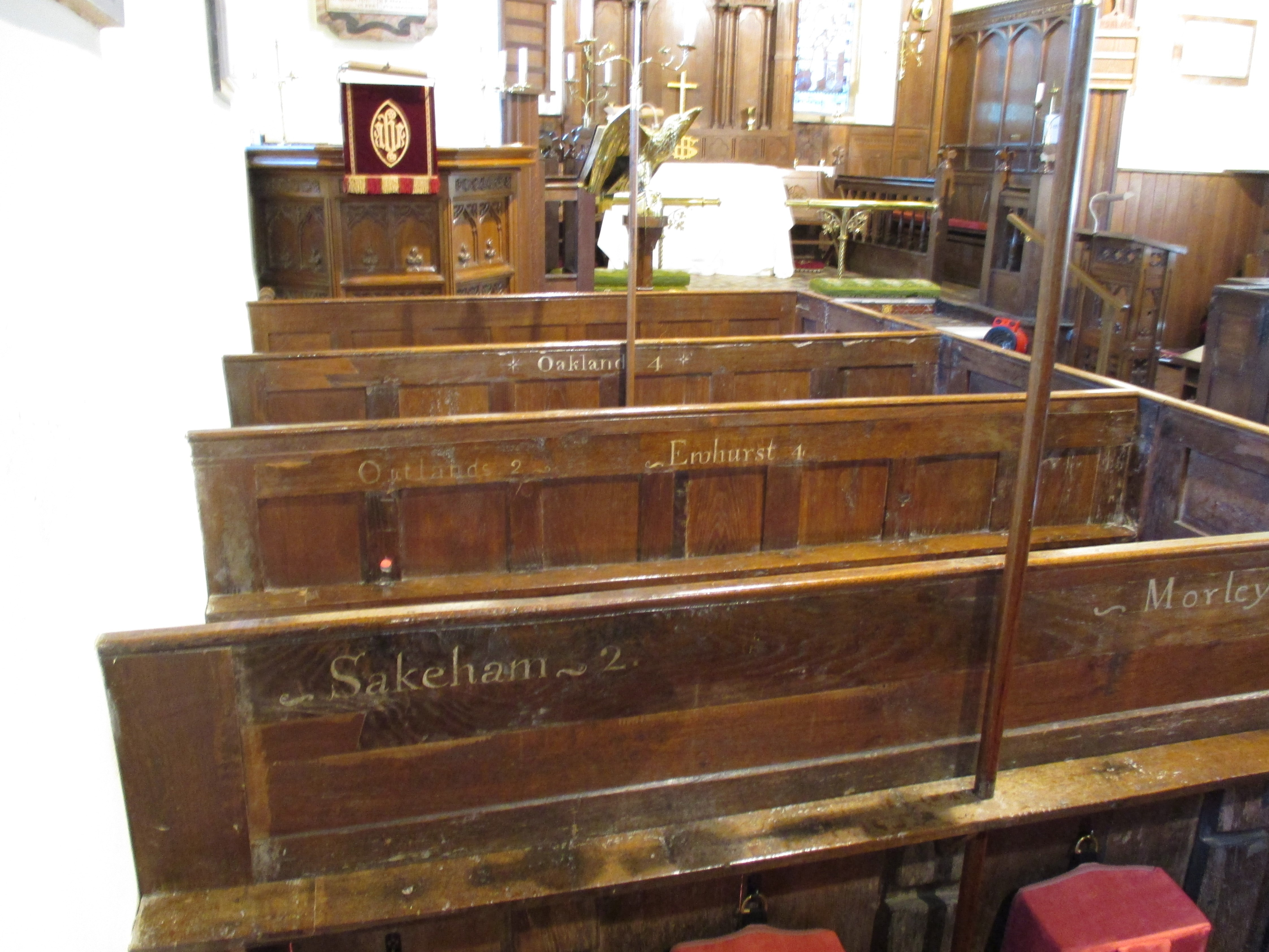
The pews, marked with the names of local farms

The church presents a mixture of styles. The rendered walls of the nave – there are no aisles – are largely 13th century, and feature on both the north and south sides blocked medieval doorways. The piscina is 13th century. The west end, however, including the wooden bell-turret, was rebuilt in either 1747 or 1836, and the porch front in 1885. The chancel in its present form is a product of the 1710 restoration, and the brick-built vestry dates from the 19th century. The gallery was built in 1748, and was altered in 1836 (probably) and 1927, the purpose of the 1927 work being to accommodate an organ. The church's windows, originally built as lancets, were given square heads in the 18th century, and in some cases were turned back into lancets between 1885 and 1933. In 1927 the organ loft was given an Art Deco window.

The octagonal font has been variously dated to c. 1300, the 14th century and the 15th century. It is decorated with alternate quatrefoils and star shapes. There are several Neoclassical memorial tablets, notably one to John Challen (died 1794) by the Lewes statuary Latter Parsons. St Giles is one of relatively few Sussex churches – others include Warminghurst, East Guldeford, Chiddingly and Penhurst – where box pews still survive. They date from c. 1747, and like the rather later pews of St George's Church, West Grinstead, they carry the names of the local farms to whose use they were appropriated. The painted Royal Arms are, unusually, those of Queen Anne. They date from the 1710 restoration of the church. The church plate all dates from the late 17th century or early 18th century, and includes a silver gilt communion cup of 1686. It is recorded that there were three bells in the 18th century, but today there are only two.

== Stained glass ==
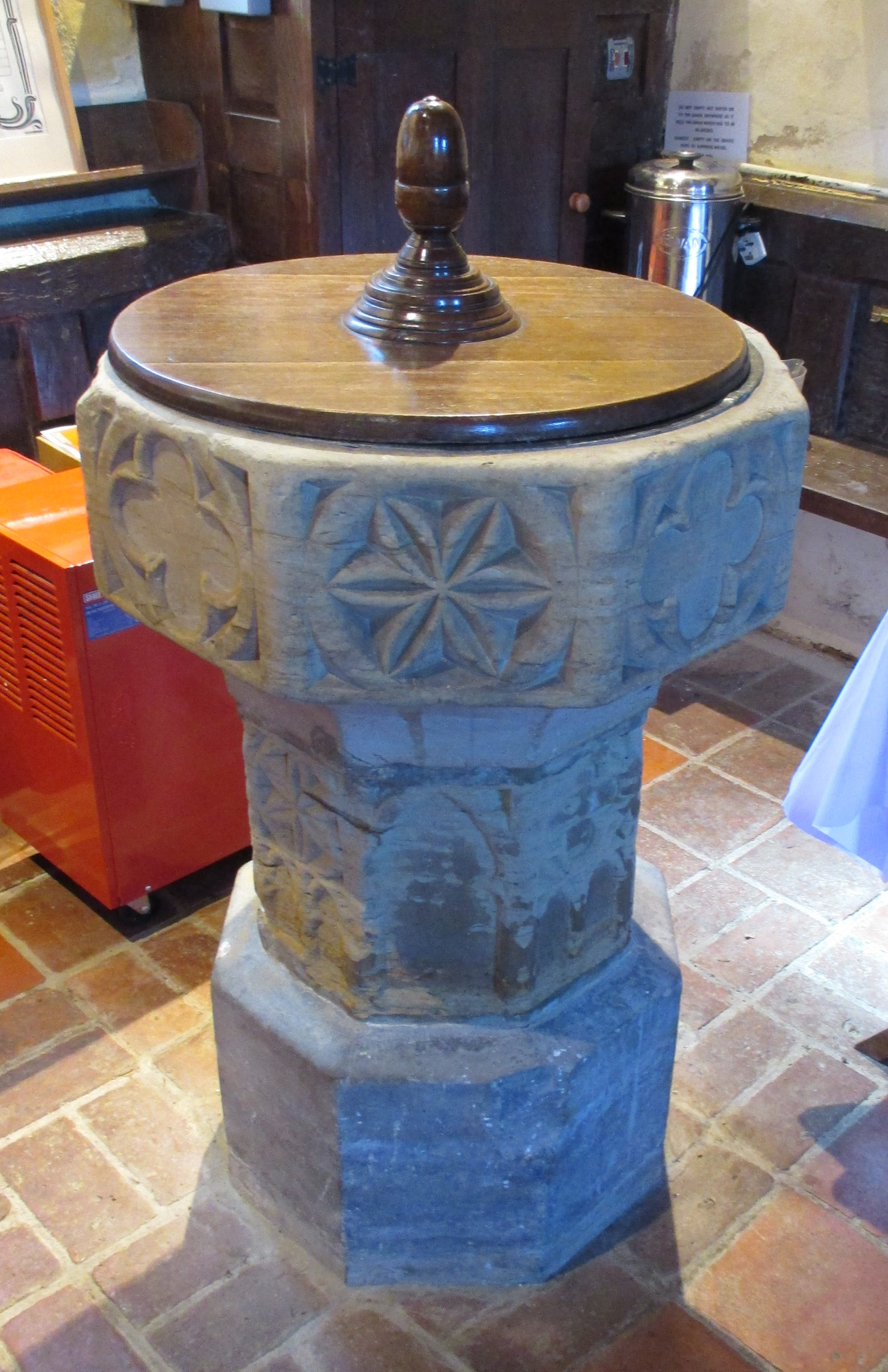
The late-medieval font

The windows of St Giles' Church contain glass by two of the most highly regarded stained-glass studios of their time. The Annunciation depicted in the east window's two widely separated lights is by Charles Eamer Kempe and has been described as "charming...as frilly as the chancel arch", while the north window of the chancel, also by Kempe, vividly represents the legend of Saint Giles. Both designs, made in the early 1890s, have been praised for the richness of their colours and textures. The third north window of the nave has heraldic glass made by the well-known firm of James Powell and Sons in 1937. There is more heraldry in other windows of the nave; also depictions of Saint Giles and Saint Francis by unknown artists and, in the third south window, a 1937 design by Christopher Charles Powell showing an open book with the text "Blessed is he that readeth". The west window contains fragments of 15th- or 16th-century stained glass collected and reset in modern times.

== Parish registers ==
The original parish registers survive from 1653. West Sussex Record Office holds them up to 1990 (christenings), 1995 (marriages), and 1974 (burials), and also microfilms of the bishop's transcripts of those registers from 1606 to 1690.

== The church today ==
In 1978 the parish of Shermanbury was united with those of Henfield and Woodmancote in a single benefice. The church was threatened with closure in 2002 but this danger has been fended off, partly with the help of the Friends of St Giles', Shermanbury, an organisation founded in December 2007 to promote the repair and renovation of the church building. The Friends have been responsible for, among other things, raising the funds needed to replace the wooden bell tower in 2011. Services are held at St Giles at 11.15 a.m. on the first and third Sundays of every month, but at other times the church is normally closed to visitors.

== See also ==
- Grade II* listed buildings in West Sussex
- List of places of worship in Horsham District

== Citations ==
- Allen, John (2024). "Shermanbury – St Giles". Sussex Parish Churches.
- Beevers, David; Marks, Richard; Roles, John (1989). Sussex Churches and Chapels. Brighton: Royal Pavilion, Art Gallery & Museums. ISBN 9780948723117.
- Burton, John (1856). "Extracts from the 'Iter Sussexiense' of Dr. John Burton". Sussex Archaeological Collections. 8. Translated by Blaauw, W. H.: 257. doi:10.5284/1085175.
- Elrington, C. R. (1987). "Wyndham Half-Hundred". In Hudson, T. P. (ed.). A History of the County of Sussex. Volume 6 Part 3: Bramber Rape (North-Eastern Part) Including Crawley New Town. Victoria History of the Counties of England. London: Oxford University Press for the Institute of Historical Research. pp. 169–198. ISBN 0197227686.
- Vigar, John E. (1986). Exploring Sussex Churches. Gillingham: Meresborough. p. 83. ISBN 0948193093.
- Whiteman, Ken; Whiteman, Joyce (1998). Ancient Churches of Sussex. Seaford: S. B. ISBN 1857701542.
- Williamson, Elizabeth; Hudson, Tim; Musson, Jeremy; Nairn, Ian (2019). Sussex: West. The Buildings of England. New Haven, CT: Yale University Press. ISBN 9780300225211.
