= Elisha Southwick House =

Historic house in Massachusetts, United States

- U.S. National Register of Historic Places
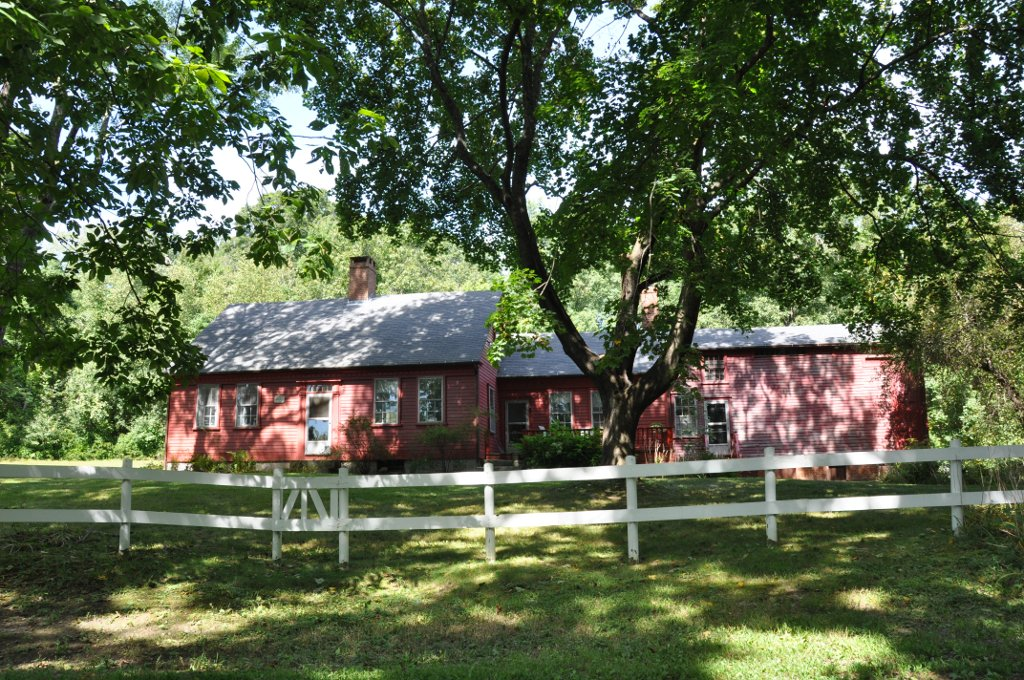

- Location within Massachusetts Location within the United States
- Location: Uxbridge, Massachusetts
- Coordinates: 42°2′22″N 71°38′45″W
- Built: 1820
- Architectural style: Federal
- MPS: Uxbridge MRA
- NRHP reference No.: 83004132
- Added to NRHP: October 7, 1983

The Elisha Southwick House is an historic house located at 255 Chocolog Road, in Uxbridge, Massachusetts, United States. The house is named for Elisha Southwick, a tanner and shoe manufacturer. David L. Southwick, who owned the house in the later decades of the 19th century, was a blacksmith who lived in the house in the late 1800s and built Conestoga wagon wheels.

The house is a 1 1/2-story wood-frame Cape style house, five bays wide, with a side-gable roof, central chimney, clapboard siding, and granite foundation. Its main facade is symmetrical, with a center entrance flanked by pilasters and topped by a transom window. The windows in the side bays are butted against the cornice in the Federal style. Probably built in the 1820s, it is a well-preserved example of vernacular Federal period architecture.

On October 7, 1983, it was added to the National Register of Historic Places.

== See also ==
- National Register of Historic Places listings in Uxbridge, Massachusetts
