= Klein's line =

Diagnostic aid in radiographs of the hip

Line of Klein
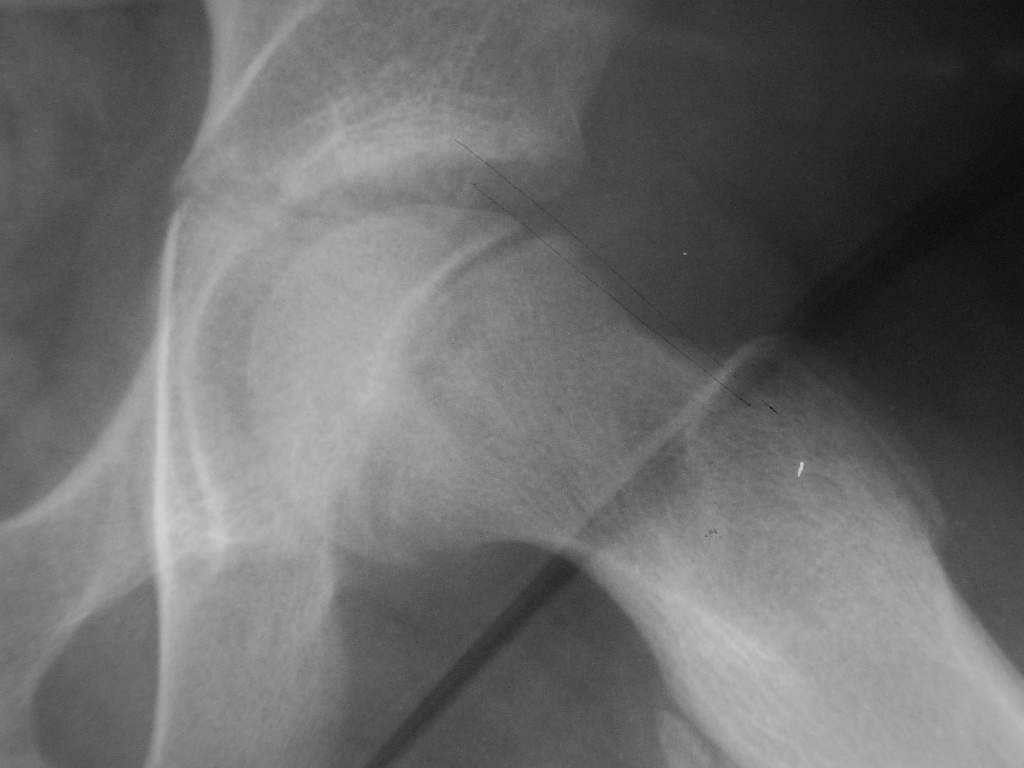
- Radiogram of slipped capital femoral epiphysis

Klein's line or the line of Klein is a virtual line that can be drawn on an X-ray of an adolescent's hip parallel to the anatomically upper edge of the femoral neck. It was the first tool to aid in the early diagnosis of a slipped capital femoral epiphysis (SCFE), which if treated late or left untreated leads to crippling arthritis, leg length discrepancy and lost range of motion. It is named after the American orthopedic surgeon Armin Klein at Harvard University, who published its description and usefulness in 1952. Subsequent modification of its use has increased the sensitivity and reliability of the tool.

== Description ==
Klein's line is a virtual line that can be drawn on an X-ray of a child's hip parallel to the upper edge of the femoral neck. If the line does not intersect with the outermost part of the femoral head 's ball-like end, the diagnosis of a slipped capital femoral epiphysis (SCFE) is confirmed.

== History ==
Klein's line is named after the orthopaedic surgeon Armin Klein (1892–1954), Chief of Orthopaedic Services at the then newly opened Beth Israel Hospital of Boston for his observations presented to the American Academy of Orthopaedic Surgeons in 1951 and published in 1952. Klein and three colleagues at Massachusetts General Hospital had seen the crippling effects in later life for a person with slipped capital femoral epiphysis; they were convinced that early diagnosis in childhood and "prophylactic procedures" were needed to treat the condition. The diagnosis was up until then made by comparing the X-ray of the suspected epiphysis with the "normal" hip on the opposite side, which in Klein's series had left 11 of 38 children undiagnosed. In children with the condition they observed an abnormal alignment of the femoral head with the femoral neck on an X-ray taken from a frontal view of the hip joint and a side view taken with the child in the frog-leg position: "The proximal part of the femoral neck at its juncture with the epiphysis was left bare superiorly and anteriorly over an area equivalent to the amount of slipping of the head as much as in the 'normal' hip."

== Usefulness ==
As early as 1957, throughout the 1960s, and into the end of the 20th century surgeons have remarked on the number of missed diagnoses using the Klein's line.

In 2009, the classic definition of Klein's line was shown to miss 60% of SCFE cases on X-rays of 30 children between 8 and 16 years of age. The sensitivity and reliability is improved by measuring the epiphyseal width lateral to Klein's line, which if differing by 2 millimetres (0.079 in) or more between hips suggests the diagnosis of SCFE.

== See also ==
- Southwick angle
