= Wayne Southwick =

American orthopedic surgeon (1923–2016)

Wayne Orin Southwick (6 February 1923 – 10 April 2016) was an American surgeon and academic. He was the first chairman of the Department of Orthopaedics and Rehabilitation at Yale University from 1958 to 1979. Southwick trained more future orthopaedic chairmen than any other chairman in the history of orthopaedics.

== Biography ==
=== Early life and education ===
Wayne O. Southwick was born in Lincoln, Nebraska in 1923. He received his undergraduate degree from the University of Nebraska in 1945 before attending the University of Nebraska College of Medicine, where he received his medical degree in 1947. While he was a student, Southwick served as an assistant in anatomy and histology. After interning at the Boston City Hospital, he moved to Baltimore where he had his residency at the Johns Hopkins Hospital.

=== Career ===
After the completion of his residency, Southwick remained on the faculty for 3 years before moving to Yale University in 1958. In 1961, Southwick became the professor of orthopaedic surgery, a position he held until his retirement.

He is credited with much pioneering work in cervical spine surgery. He was an advocate of the now commonly used anterior cervical spine approach. A posterior cervical spine fixation technique also bears his name.

He was also credited with an osteotomy (Southwick osteotomy) for the treatment of Slipped capital femoral epiphysis (SCFE) or slipped upper femoral epithysis (SUFE) . He also has an angle measured on an SCFE named after him (Southwick angle).

He has over 80 publications to his credit.

He created a diverse atmosphere at the Yale Orthopaedics resident training program. He is credited with bringing the first African American surgical resident, Augustus White, to Yale University in 1963. In 2003, he received the Diversity Award from the American Academy of Orthopaedic Surgeons. He later wrote an article narrating his reasoning and efforts to bring talented people to Yale regardless of race, creed or nationality.

=== Sculptor ===
He is also an accomplished sculptor with various works on display at the Yale campus. He started his sculpting at the Lyme Academy College of Fine Arts and also studied under the Italian sculptor Bruno Lucchesi.
