= Vivienne Wallington =

Australian novelist

- Born: 1937 (age 88–89); Australia
- Occupation: Novelist
- Writing career
- Pen name: Elizabeth Duke
- Period: 1985–present
- Genre: Romance

Vivienne Wallington (born 1937) is an Australian author of romance novels under her own name as well as the pen name Elizabeth Duke.

== Biography ==
Wallington worked for many years as a librarian and wrote three children's books before beginning to write in the romance genre. Nineteen of her novels were published under the Harlequin Romance line under the pseudonym Elizabeth Duke. She now writes under own name for various Silhouette lines. Romantic Times described her writing as it "captivates readers with intense passion, a strong emotional conflict and endearing characters."

Wallington lives in Melbourne with her husband John. They have two grown children.

== Works ==
=== Novels ===
- Somewhere (1983)
- Butterfingers (1986)
- Claiming His Bride (2001)
- Kindergarten Cupids (2002)
- In Her Husband's Image (2004)
- The Last Time I Saw Venice (2005)

=== As Elizabeth Duke ===
- Softly Flits a Shadow (1985)
- Windarra Stud (1988)
- Island Deception (1989)
- Fair Trail (1990)
- Wild Temptation (1991)
- Whispering Vines (1992)
- Outback Legacy (1993)
- Bogus Bride (1993)
- Shattered Wedding (1994)
- Make-believe Family (1995)
- To Catch a Playboy (1995)
- Heartless Stranger (1996)
- The Marriage Pact (1997)
- Takeover Engagement (1997)
- Taming a Husband (1997)
- Look-Alike Fiancée (1998)
- The Husband Dilemma (1998)
- The Parent Test (1999)
- The Outback Affair (2000)

=== Omnibus ===
- In Her Husband's Image / Then There Were Three (2004) (with Lynda Sandoval)
- Beauty Queen's Makeover / Last Time I Saw Venice (2005) (with Teresa Southwick)

== See also ==
- List of romantic novelists
