= Baybridge Canal =

Canal in West Sussex, England

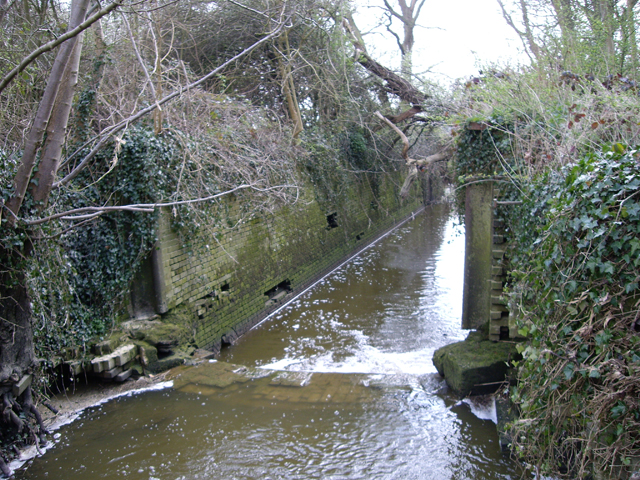
- The disused lock at the lower end of the canal
- Interactive map of Baybridge Canal

Specifications
- Maximum boat length: 75 ft 0 in (22.86 m)
- Maximum boat beam: 12 ft 6 in (3.81 m)
- Locks: 2
- Status: reverted to river

History
- Date completed: 1826
- Date closed: 1875

Geography
- Connects to: River Adur

The Baybridge Canal was a short canal built entirely within the parish of West Grinstead in the English county of Sussex. It opened in 1826, and closed in 1875.

== History ==
The River Adur is formed when the Western Adur and the Eastern Adur join near Henfield. The Western branch starts near Slinfold, and flows through Shipley and West Grinstead. The Eastern branch rises on Ditchling Common, and flows through Haywards Heath and Burgess Hill. Below the junction, the combined stream flows for 10.8 miles (17.4 km) to reach the English Channel at the port of Shoreham-by-Sea. Under the River Adur Navigation and Drainage Act 1807 (47 Geo. 3 Sess. 2. c. cxvii), the river was improved, to aid both navigation and drainage, and barges could reach Bines Bridge on the Western Adur.

Baybridge Canal Act 1825
- Act of Parliament
- Parliament of the United Kingdom
- Long title: An Act for making and maintaining a navigable Cut or Canal from the River Adur, at or near Binesbridge, in the Parish of West Grinsted, in the County of Sussex, to Baybridge, in the said Parish.
- Citation: 6 Geo. 4. c. clxiv

Dates
- Royal assent: 22 June 1825

Text of statute as originally enacted

In 1824, the civil engineer May Upton produced a plan for extending the navigation northwards to West Grinstead, at a cost of just under £6,000. This formed the basis for another act of Parliament, the Baybridge Canal Act 1825 (6 Geo. 4. c. clxiv), and created the Baybridge Canal Company. Seven men were named as proprietors, including Lord Selsey and Sir Charles Merrick Burrell, and they were empowered to raise £6,000 by issuing shares, and an additional £3,000 by mortgages if required. Although called a canal, it was essentially a river navigation, as it followed the course of the river to West Grinstead, to terminate at a wharf near the Worthing to Horsham turnpike road, now the A24.

The canal ran for 3.5 miles (5.6 km) from Bines Bridge to the wharf at Baybridge. There were two locks, designed for boats which were 75 by 12.5 feet (22.9 by 3.8 m), each with a 7-foot rise. All of the route was within the parish of West Grinstead, and the construction work was completed in 1826. The main trade was manure, coal and chalk. The canal closed on 1 September 1875 due to competition from the railways, having been little used after the opening of the railway from Shoreham to West Grinstead in 1861.

== Course ==
The waterway was crossed by a swing bridge just above the lower lock, and a lift bridge at Hatterell Farm. Both have been replaced by fixed bridges, and the Environment Agency maintain a gauging station at the Hatterell Farm bridge, which measures flows in the river. The average flow up to 2005 was 22.43 million gallons (101.9 Megalitres) per day.

== Points of interest ==
Point	Coordinates (Links to map resources)	OS Grid Ref	Notes
Bay Bridge wharf	50.9741°N 0.3402°W	TQ166207	Start of navigation
Butchers Row bridge	50.9727°N 0.3341°W	TQ170205	
Hatterell Farm bridge	50.9650°N 0.3235°W	TQ178197	once a lift bridge
Locks bridge	50.9556°N 0.3218°W	TQ179186	once a swing bridge
Lower lock	50.9536°N 0.3222°W	TQ179184	End of navigation
Bines Green bridge	50.9452°N 0.3081°W	TQ189175	River tidal below here

== Bibliography ==
- Cumberlidge, Jane (2009). Inland Waterways of Great Britain (8th Ed.). Imray Laurie Norie and Wilson. ISBN 978-1-84623-010-3.
- Marsh, T J; Hannaford, J, eds. (2008). UK Hydrometric Register. Hydrological data UK series (PDF). Centre for Ecology & Hydrology. Archived from the original (PDF) on 31 October 2014.
- Priestley, Joseph (1831). "Historical Account of the Navigable Rivers, Canals, and Railways, of Great Britain". Archived from the original on 10 March 2016.
- Vine, P.A.L. (1985). West Sussex Waterways. Middleton Press. ISBN 978-0-906520-24-6.

== See also ==
Media related to Baybridge Canal at Wikimedia Commons

- Canals of Great Britain
- History of the British canal system
