= Bines Green =

Hamlet in West Sussex, England

Coordinates: 50.94287°N 0.31357°W

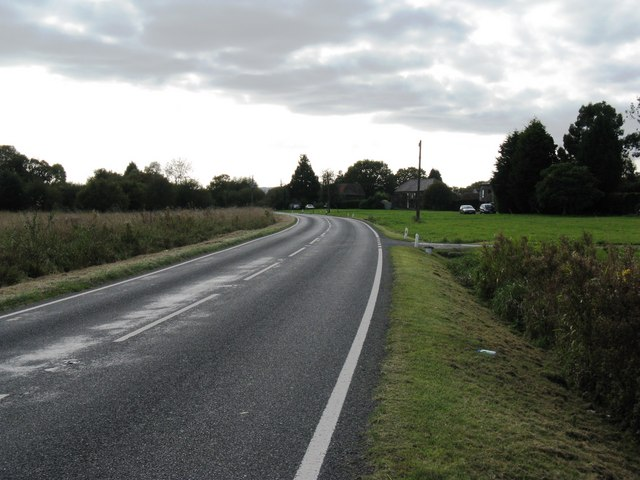
- B2135 passing through Bines Green towards Ashurst

- Location within West Sussex
- OS grid reference: TQ186173
- Civil parish: Ashurst
- District: Horsham
- Shire county: West Sussex
- Region: South East
- Country: England
- Sovereign state: United Kingdom
- Police: Sussex
- Fire: West Sussex
- Ambulance: South East Coast
- UK Parliament: Arundel and South Downs

Bines Green is a hamlet in the Horsham District of West Sussex, England. It lies 1.9 miles (3.1 km) north west of Henfield on the B2135 road between Ashurst and Partridge Green.

The western River Adur flows through the hamlet. Bines Bridge, just north of Bines Green, marks the limit of tidal waters flowing up the western Adur. Bines Bridge is 17.9 km (11.1 mi) from the mouth of the Adur at Shoreham-by-Sea.
