= Elisha Southwick =

Tanner and shoe manufacturer born Massachusetts, USA

Elisha Southwick was a tanner and shoe manufacturer born in Quaker City in the town of Uxbridge, Massachusetts on April 4, 1809 to Phebe and Royal Southwick. He married Delia Purinton on January 13, 1835, and they had five children: Turner, Selvin, Annie, Marianna, and Freeman. Elisha Southwick died in Sturbridge, Massachusetts on February 6, 1875.

== Family ==
Elisha Southwick was a direct descendant of Lawrence Southwick and Cassandra Southwick who, because of their Quaker beliefs, were banished from Salem, Massachusetts by the Puritans in 1659.

Elisha Southwick's father, Royal, was a tanner and a preacher of the Society of Friends or Quakers. His brother Royal Southwick was a successful businessman in Lowell, Massachusetts, and a prominent member of the Whig Party. His brother Jonathan F. ran a tanning and currying business in Ironstone, Massachusetts (South Uxbridge). His brother James was a wool puller. Elisha's other siblings were Farnum, Lydia, Phebe, and Urana.

== Elisha Southwick's home ==
The Elisha Southwick House is located in Chocolog Village (also known as Ironstone, Massachusetts or South Uxbridge) at 255 Chocolog Road. This wooden clapboard house was built between 1820 and 1830 and was occupied by Elisha Southwick by 1855. Elisha and his brother Jonathan had rebuilt the Ironstone Mill after it burnt to the ground the first time. They produced the cloth to produce Kentucky jeans. During this time, Elisha was also producing a wagon each month and handling some smaller side jobs like carts, too. The brothers also ran a tannery and Jonathan operated a brick yard, too, off River Road in the Ironstone Village.

By the 1870s, David L. Southwick was living in the home . He was a farmer and a blacksmith. He produced Conestoga Wagon wheels, which the pioneers used to travel westward in during the late 1800s. The family burial ground, which might be the oldest in Uxbridge, lies between this home and George Southwick's home.

The Elisha Southwick House is on the US National Register of Historic Places. The town of Uxbridge has 60 buildings which are on the national register of historic places. The town has more than 250 buildings which are listed on the Massachusetts state registry of historic places.
