= Teresa Southwick =

American novelist

- Born: Unknown; California, United States
- Occupation: Novelist
- Writing career
- Period: 1994–present
- Genre: romance

Teresa Southwick (born in California, United States) is an American author of contemporary and historical romance novels.

== Biography ==
Teresa Southwick was conceived in New Jersey, born in Southern California, and moved to Texas, where she lived for many years. She now resides with her husband and their two sons in Las Vegas, Nevada.

Southwick has been nominated three times for a Romantic Times Reviewers' Choice Award, winning in 2006 for In Good Company. She was also nominated in 2003 for a Romantic Times Career Achievement Award for a series romance and has been a finalist for the Romance Writers of America RITA Award, the highest award given to romance authors.

== Bibliography ==
=== Novels ===
- Reckless Destiny (1994)
- Reckless River (1994)
- Winter Bride (1995)
- Blackstone's Bride (1996)
- Wedding Rings and Baby Things (1997)
- The Bachelor's Baby (1997)
- The Way to a Cowboys Heart (1999)
- Secret Ingredient: Love (2001)
- Midnight, Moonlight and Miracles (2003)
- It Takes Three (2004)
- At the Millionaire's Request (2006)
- Winning Back His Bride (2006)
- Paging Dr. Daddy (2008)

=== Bundles of Joy Series Multi-Author ===
- A Vow, a Ring, a Baby Swing (1999)

=== Marchetti Series ===
1. A Vow, a Ring, a Baby Swing (1999)
2. And Then He Kissed Me (1999)
3. With a Little T.L.C (2000)
4. The Last Marchetti Bachelor (2001)

=== Storkville, U.S.A. Series Multi-Author ===
- The Acquired Bride (2000)

=== Fortune's Heirs Series ===
- Shotgun Vows (2001)

=== Destiny, Texas Series ===
1. Crazy for Lovin' You (2001)
2. This Kiss (2001)
3. If You Don't Know by Now (2001)
4. What If We Fall in Love? (2002)

=== Coltons Series Multi-Author ===
- Sky Full of Promise (2002)

=== Desert Brides Series Multi-Author ===
- To Catch a Sheik (2003)
- To Kiss a Sheik (2003)
- To Wed a Sheik (2003)

=== If Wishes Were... Series ===
1. Baby, Oh Baby! (2004)
2. Flirting with the Boss (2004)
3. An Heiress on His Doorstep (2004)

=== Most Likely to... Series Multi-Author ===
- The Beauty Queen's Makeover (2005)

=== Brides of Bella Lucia Series Multi-Author ===
- Crazy about the Boss (2006)

=== Buy-A-Guy Series ===
1. That Touch Of Pink (2006)
2. In Good Company (2006)
3. Something's Gotta Give (2006)

=== Brothers of Bha'Khar Series ===
1. The Sheikh's Reluctant Bride (2007)
2. The Sheikh's Contract Bride (2007)

=== Omnibus in collaboration ===
- The Summer House (2002) (with Susan Mallery)
- Sky Full of Promise / The Wolf's Surrender (2003) (with Sandra Steffen)
- It Takes Three / Wedding Willies (2004) (with Victoria Pade)
- Beauty Queen's Makeover / Last Time I Saw Venice (2005) (with Vivienne Wallington)

== See also ==
- List of romantic novelists
