= Southwick Ship Canal =

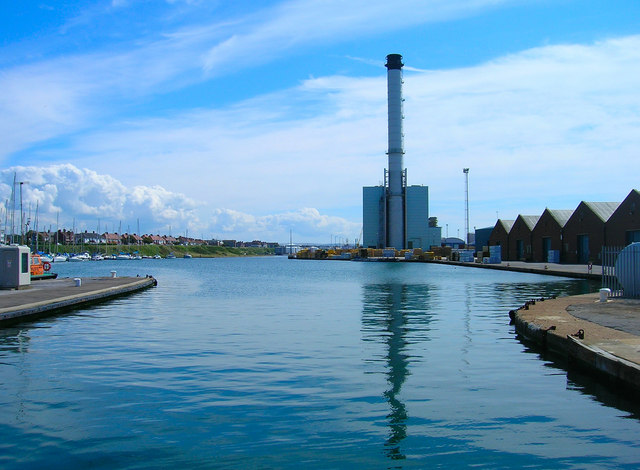
- Shoreham power station viewed from the footbridge crossing the entrance lock to the canal

Specifications
- Length: 1.75 miles (2.82 km)
- Maximum boat length: 374 ft 0 in (114.0 m)
- Maximum boat beam: 57 ft 0 in (17.4 m)
- Locks: 2
- Status: Navigable
- Navigation authority: Shoreham Port Harbour Office

History
- Date completed: 1855

Geography
- Start point: Shoreham
- End point: Portslade-by-Sea
- Connects to: River Adur

The Southwick Ship Canal or Southwick Canal is a canal in Southwick, West Sussex that branches off from the estuary of the River Adur near Hove. The canal is 1.75 miles in length, running east–west and parallel with the shoreline, providing facilities to the port of Shoreham. The canal was once the river channel, but the mouth of the river has been moved further to the west, enabling its former bed to be used for the canal.

== History ==
Shoreham, Southwick, and Portslade are located side by side on the West Sussex coast. The River Adur flows from the north, and turns to the east near Shoreham, to reach the English Channel. The area has a long history as a centre for shipping. In Roman times, there were ports at Old Shoreham and Beeding on the lower reaches of the River Adur, and a road from London to the port passed through Portus Ladus ("the way to the port"), eventually giving rise to the name Portslade. It was thought that the Roman fort Portus Adurni was located near the mouth of the river, but Portus Adurni is now usually linked with Porchester. Southwick is a Saxon name, and was given to the town by Saxons who landed at the river mouth. In Norman times, the port was a centre for importing wine and for exports of wool. King John landed there in 1199, and it subsequently became a Royal Arsenal. A shipbuilding industry developed, and in 1346 Shoreham supplied 26 ships to Edward III for his wars with the French.

The mouth of the river was not ideal for shipping, as there were large amounts of shingle, which moved with the tides, and in 1760 the Commissioners of Shoreham Harbour met to plan a new entrance to the river further to the west. A second channel was cut through the shingle bank in 1816, at the site of the present river mouth. This left 1.75 miles (2.82 km) of former river channel, which was turned into a harbour by constructing a lock, near the site of the present dry dock. The channel became the Southwick Ship Canal, and was first used by shipping in 1855. A gas works was built between the canal and the sea in 1870, and a power station was built by Brighton Corporation in 1897. Both needed supplies of coal, which arrived on the canal for offloading at wharfs.

Several improvements were made to the canal. The bed of the canal was dredged, to make it deeper, and a new lock, the Prince George Lock, was completed in 1933. This is 170.5 feet (52.0 m) long, 18 feet (5.5 m) wide, and can accommodate ships with a draught of 18 feet (5.5 m). In 1944, the port was used as a departure point for troops going to France for the D-day landings. Trade increased further when a second coal-fired power station was commissioned in 1953. The entrance from the sea was improved in 1957, by the addition of east and west breakwaters, and in 1958 Prince Philip, Duke of Edinburgh opened an additional lock, which carries his name. It is considerably bigger than the Prince George Lock, at 374 feet (114 m) long, 57 feet (17 m) wide, and suitable for draughts of up to 22 feet (6.7 m). It is primarily used for commercial vessels, with the smaller lock used for fishing boats and yachts. There was a downturn in traffic after 1987, when the power station was decommissioned, but a new power station was completed in 2000.

== See also ==
- Canals of Great Britain
- History of the British canal system

== Bibliography ==
- Cumberlidge, Jane (2009). Inland Waterways of Great Britain (8th Ed.). Imray Laurie Norie and Wilson. ISBN 978-1-84623-010-3.
