= Shermanbury =

Village and parish in West Sussex, England

Coordinates: 50.95981°N 0.28559°W

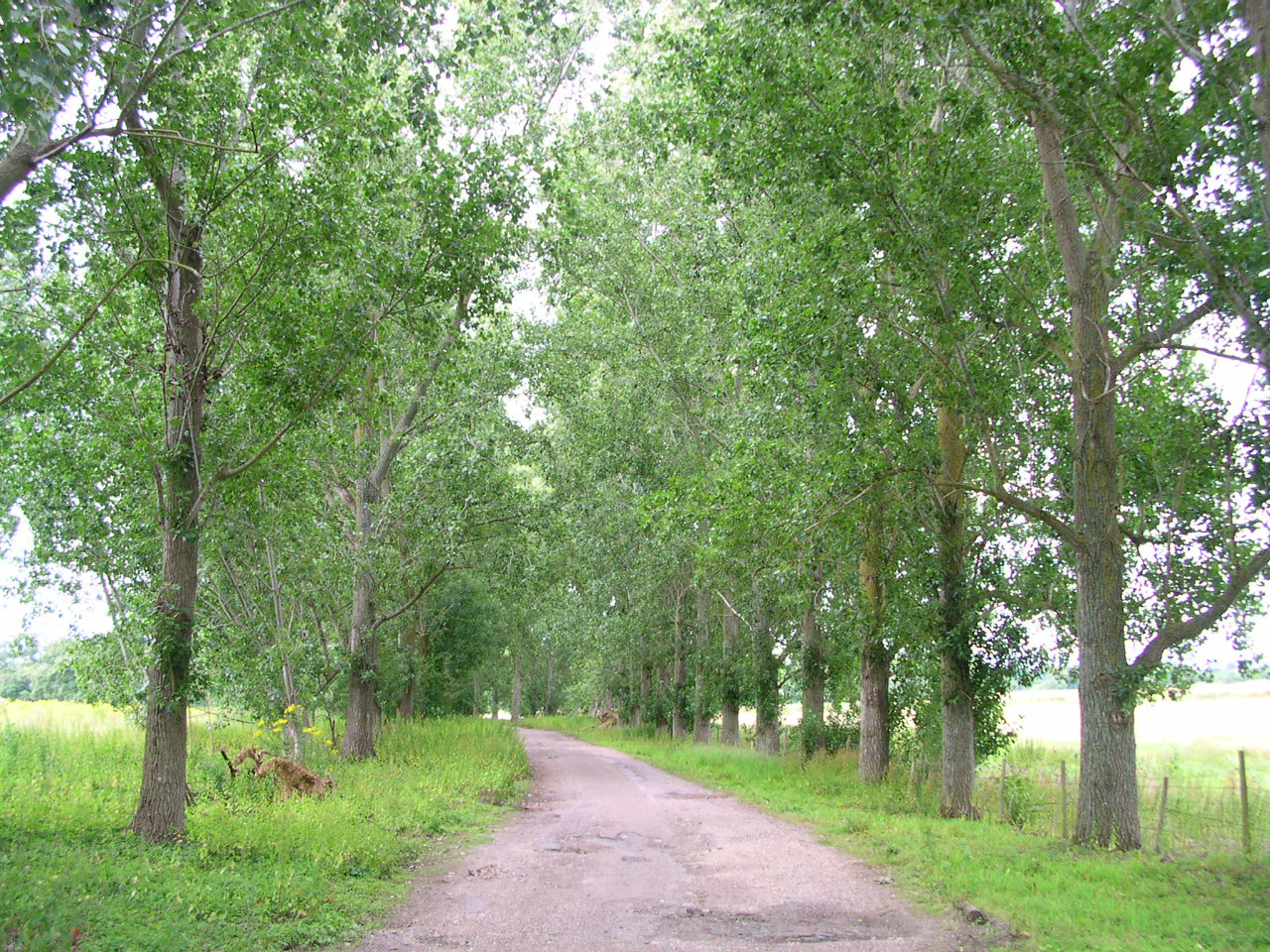
- The avenue of trees leading to the church

- Location within West Sussex
- Area: 7.75 km^{2} (2.99 sq mi)
- Population: 454 2001 Census; 542 (2011 Census including Wineham)
  - Density: 59/km^{2} (150/sq mi)
- OS grid reference: TQ205192
  - London: 38 miles (61 km) N
- Civil parish: Shermanbury
- District: Horsham
- Shire county: West Sussex
- Region: South East
- Country: England
- Sovereign state: United Kingdom
- Post town: HORSHAM
- Postcode district: RH13
- Dialling code: 01403
- Police: Sussex
- Fire: West Sussex
- Ambulance: South East Coast
- UK Parliament: Arundel and South Downs

Shermanbury is a village and civil parish in the Horsham District of West Sussex, England. It lies on the A281 road approximately 2 miles (3 km) north of Henfield. The present day village consists mainly of a ribbon development of bungalows on the east side of the A281, while the ancient parish church is to the east by Shermanbury Place. Between these is Ewhurst Manor, a 16th-century house on an old moated site with a 14th-century stone gatehouse and nearby artificial lake and farmstead.

The eastern River Adur flows through Shermanbury, where it is met by the Cowfold Stream. The Normal Tidal Limit is at the footbridge near the church although a weir further downstream means only the highest tides reach this far. Boats could reach Mock Bridge (where the A281 crosses the river) until the early 1800s.

The parish has a land area of 775 hectares (1,915 acres). In the 2001 census 454 people lived in 182 households of whom 253 were economically active. The population at the 2011 Census was 542.

== History ==
In the Domesday Book, based on a survey completed in 1086, the manor of Shermanbury, then called Salmonesberie, is held by Ralph from William de Braose, having been formerly held by Azor from King Harold. There are two ploughs, one belonging to the lord and one shared by one villager and three smallholders. There is a small church and four slaves. There are three other manors in Shermanbury parish, Woolfly, also held by Ralph, and Morley and Sakeham held by William son of Ranulph. The parishes of Shermanbury and Cowfold comprised the Saxon hundred of Hamfelt, and was on the eastern boundary of the Norman Rape of Bramber.

Shermanbury's Saxon name indicates its past function: the burh or defended stronghold of the scirman - shire man, perhaps the sheriff, but maybe some other official or steward. It has been suggested that the burh was the stronghold of one of the Saxon longitudinal divisions of the county. The abrupt slopes of the hillock used to be joined to the higher land to the east, but a second channel of the Cowfold Stream was cut through that peninsular long ago, making it an island. On that eastern side too, you can see the remains of an ancient bank and ditch defending the peninsular burh.

Shermanbury's manor house and church on their knoll (TQ 214 188) is surrounded on all sides by the Adur and the Cowfold Streams and the fields were traditionally flood plains. In Christmas 2012 the manor became an island for 10 days, cut off by floods, with the park drive under three foot of water. Christmas church services had to be cancelled. The area was also flooded in 2020.

== Notable buildings and areas ==
Notable areas around Shermanbury

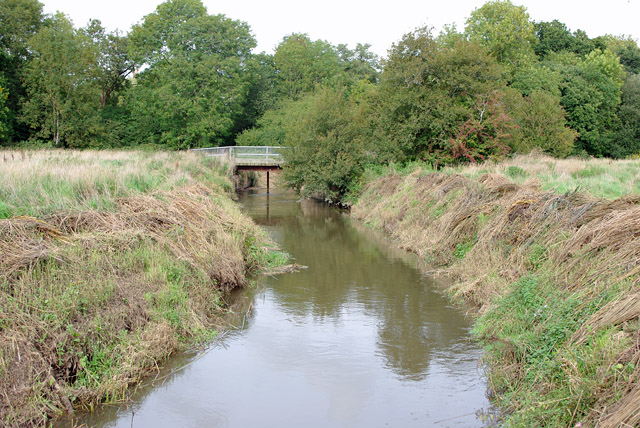
Adur footbridge south of Shermanbury Place

None of the farm houses in the area are now owned by a resident farmer, and just four let their land for farming by neighbouring farmers. The rest are managed for leisure in its various forms. Frylands Farm was the last to be broken up and sold, in 2015.

To the south of the 18th century Shermanbury Place (which replaced the earlier manor house) is a reedy mill pond, whose peace is only broken by the calls of water birds. To the west, where the old Cowfold Stream joins the Adur, are the footings, races, and wharf of the water mill that long clacked and rumbled there.

Scattered about the knoll, and towards Ewhurst, are eight fine veteran oaks, one over four spans girth. Much is wild around the Ewhurst Place, its outbuildings and the Park. Its light-touch management, however, offers much more space for nature than over-busy tidying and modernisation and wintering snipe upon the brooks benefit from it.

=== The parish church ===
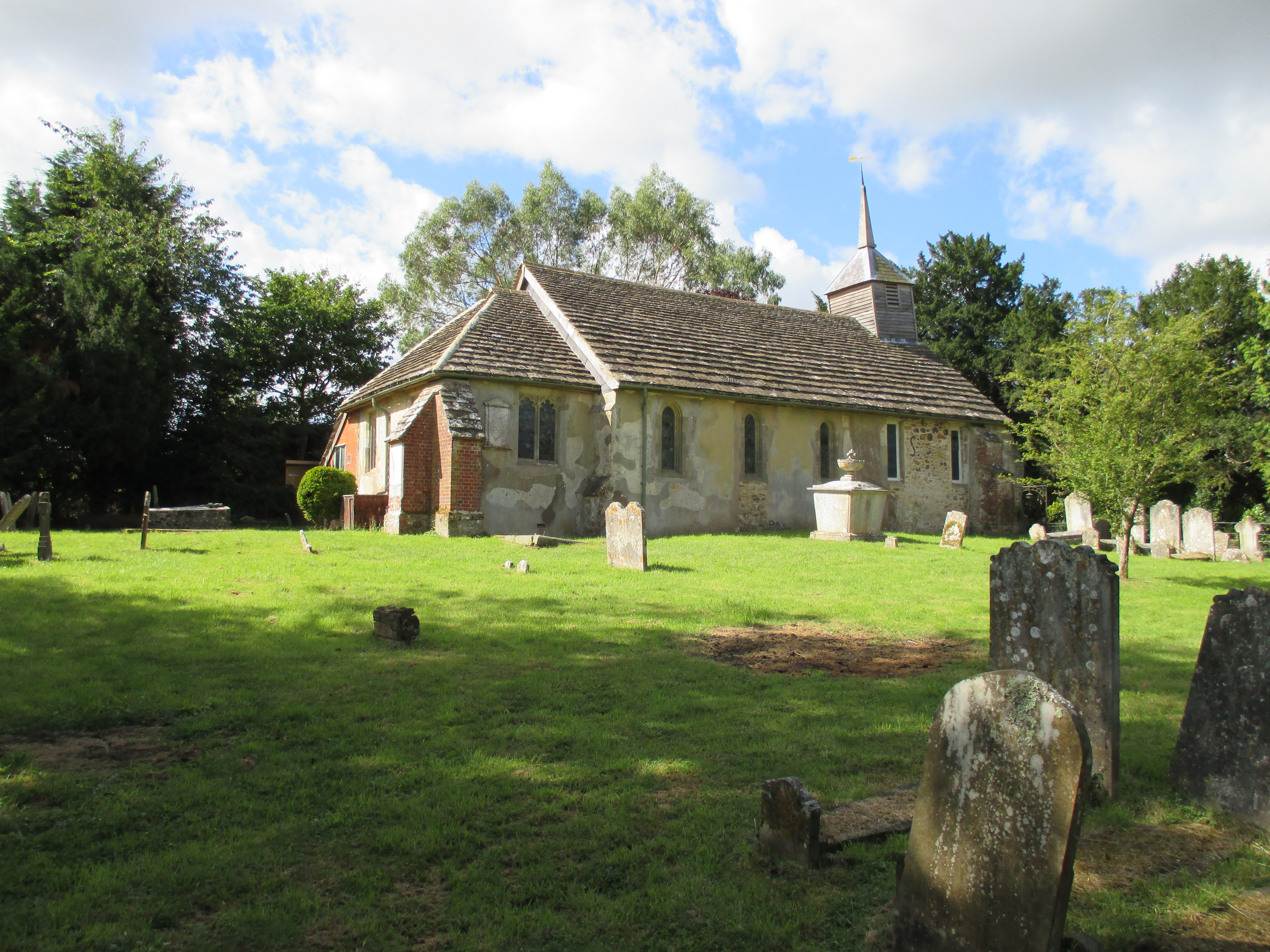

The Anglican church of St. Giles (TQ 214 188) is well away from the modern roads, approached along a tree-lined bridleway leading to Shermanbury Place, east of the Brighton road. A small church is mentioned in the Domesday Book, but the present structure is of 14th-century origin. The roof is made from Horsham stone slates with a weatherboarded bell tower at the west end, containing two bells. The door and stone roofed porch are at the west end. Inside 18th century pews have the names of farm houses to which they were allocated painted on the backs: Perrymans, Sakeham, Vadgers, Pooks, and so on. It is now locked, but the church warden will show people round on request. Its wildflower-rich graveyard is untouched by burials since it was declared full in 1888.

=== Shermanbury Place ===
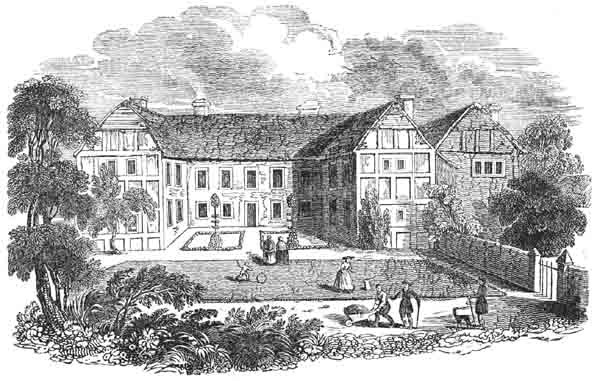
The Tudor predecessor of Shermanbury Place

Shermanbury Place (TQ 213 188) adjacent to the church in Shermanbury Park, is a mansion built by John Challen in 1779 on the site of a 16th-century Tudor house with projecting crosswings. The Tudor house was built by one of the Comber family. Sir Richard Comber was Clarenceaux King of Arms. His son Doctor Thomas Comber was prominent in the Church of England. Educated at Trinity College, Cambridge he rose to become master of the college, and later vice-chancellor of the university. As the king's chaplain he was staunchly royalist and was imprisoned by parliament for attempting to give the university treasures to the king.

Shermanbury was a Saxon 'burh', or fortified place, perhaps even an older 'promontory fort'. It was protected on three sides by the Cowfold Stream and the Eastern Adur (Wyndham Brook) at their confluence. It was protected on its eastern side by a bank and ditch, which is still visible in part. A modern cut, through which flows the re-directed Cowfold Stream, now severs the spur from the high ground to its east, thus making Shermanbury a kind of island.

The manorial cluster of big house, church, and home farm survive, and were joined some time before 1611 by a water mill, whose overgrown reedy pond survives, though the mill buildings are gone. There are wonderful giant oaks. Nightingales sing of summer in the bushy thickets. Barn owls hunt on the rough pastures. Water birds call, and bats of many species flit by in the dusk.

=== Ewhurst Manor ===
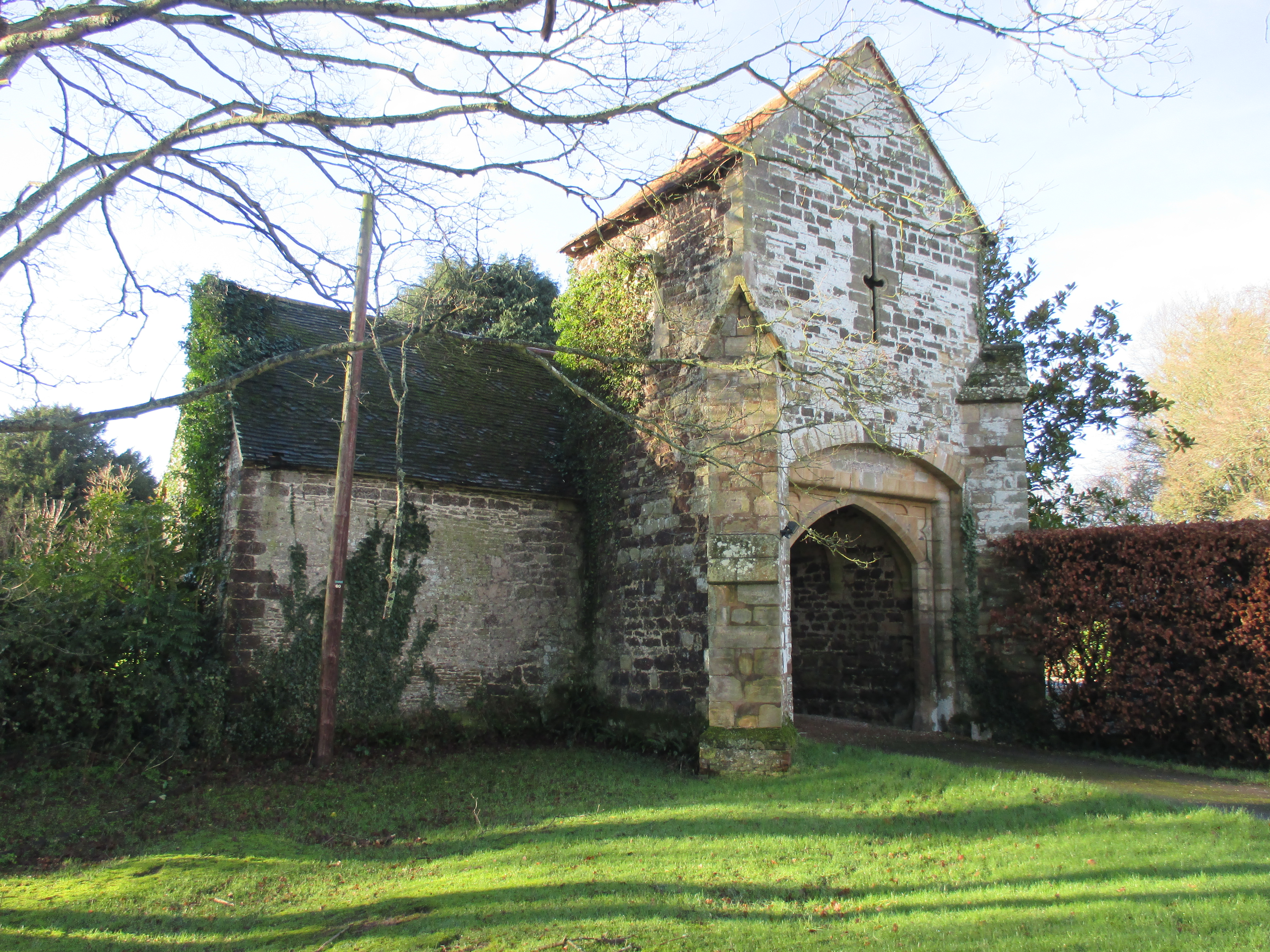
Ewhurst Manor gatehouse

The moated manor house (TQ 211 189) was built by Thomas Peverel during the reign of Edward I. Only the early 14th-century gatehouse, with a porters lodge attached survives. A room over the gateway has a cross shaped loop window. Ewhurst manor occupied the western third of Shermanbury parish. The existence of a deer park at Ewhurst was recorded in 1274, during the 14th century, and in 1538.

=== Woodland ===
Though trees are everywhere, this is a landscape with only a light dusting of small ancient woods: none large. Much old woodland clearance has happened and the flora of ancient woodland has often retreated to the hedges and shaws along the swine pasture droves, which in ecological terms, have some of the 'refugia' function that the gills play in the High Weald. Wild Service tree survives in a few places and bluebells, wood anemones and midland hawthorn grace Wineham Lane's banks.

However, over the last two centuries a series of new woods have been planted, many quite recently, whilst others have grown up from old furze fields, or from land left derelict. Some of these secondary woods now form quite large clusters, such as around Shermanbury and Ewhurst: Waymarks Wood (TQ 202 198) and the Buckhatch Lane woods (TQ 226 206) . Some of the older secondary woods have acquired many ancient woodland species, and have been managed on traditional lines and are difficult to distinguish from ancient woods.
