= Slipped capital femoral epiphysis =

- Other names: Slipped upper femoral epiphysis, coxa vara adolescentium, SCFE, SUFE
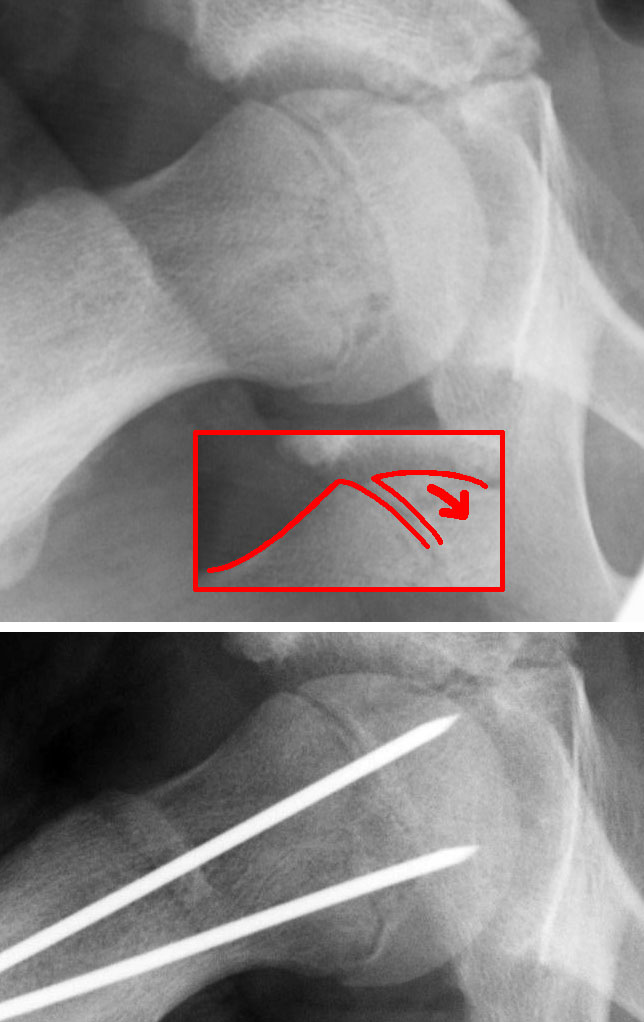
- X-ray showing a slipped capital femoral epiphysis, before and after surgical fixation.
- Specialty: Orthopedic surgery
- Symptoms: Groin pain, referred knee and thigh pain, waddling gait, restricted range of motion of leg
- Usual onset: Adolescence
- Risk factors: Obesity, hypothyroidism

Slipped capital femoral epiphysis (SCFE, or skiffy), or slipped upper femoral epiphysis (SUFE, or souffy), or coxa vara adolescentium, is a medical term referring to a fracture through the growth plate (physis), which results in slippage of the overlying end of the femur (metaphysis).

Normally, the head of the femur, called the caput femoris in Latin, should sit squarely on the femoral neck. Abnormal movement along the growth plate results in the slip. The term slipped capital femoral epiphysis is actually a misnomer, because the epiphysis (end part of a bone) remains in its normal anatomical position in the acetabulum (hip socket) due to the ligamentum teres femoris. It is actually the metaphysis (neck part of a bone) which slips in an anterior direction with external rotation.

SCFE is the most common hip disorder in adolescence. SCFEs usually cause groin pain on the affected side, but sometimes cause knee or thigh pain. One in five cases involves both hips, resulting in pain on both sides of the body. SCFE occurs slightly more commonly in adolescent males, especially young black males, although it also affects females. Whilst it can occur in any child, the major risk factor is childhood obesity. Symptoms include the gradual, progressive onset of thigh or knee pain with a painful limp. Hip motion will be limited, particularly internal rotation. Running, and other strenuous activity on legs, will also cause the hips to abnormally move due to the condition and can potentially worsen the pain. Stretching is very limited.

== Signs and symptoms ==
Usually, a SCFE causes groin pain, but it may cause pain in only the thigh or knee, because the pain may be referred along the distribution of the obturator nerve. The pain may occur on both sides of the body (bilaterally), as up to 40 percent of cases involve slippage on both sides. In cases of bilateral SCFEs, they typically occur within one year of each other. About 20 percent of all cases include a SCFE on both sides at the time of presentation.

Signs of a SCFE include a waddling gait, decreased range of motion. Often the range of motion in the hip is restricted in internal rotation, abduction, and flexion. A person with a SCFE may prefer to hold their hip in flexion and external rotation.

=== Complications ===
Failure to treat a SCFE may lead to: death of bone tissue in the femoral head (avascular necrosis), degenerative hip disease (hip osteoarthritis), gait abnormalities and chronic pain. SCFE is associated with a greater risk of arthritis of the hip joint later in life. 17–47 percent of acute cases of SCFE lead to the death of bone tissue (osteonecrosis) effects.

== Cause ==
In general, SCFE is caused by increased force applied across the epiphysis, or a decrease in the resistance within the physis to shearing. Obesity is the by far the most significant risk factor. A study in Scotland looked at the weight of 600,000 infants, and followed them up to see who got SCFE. This study identified that obese children had an almost twenty times greater risk than thin children, with a 'dose-response'- so the greater the weight of the child, the greater the risk of SCFE. In 65 percent of cases of SCFE, the person is over the 95th percentile for weight. Endocrine diseases may also contribute (though are far less of a risk than obesity), such as hypothyroidism, hypopituitarism, and renal osteodystrophy.

Sometimes no single cause accounts for SCFE, and several factors play a role in the development of a SCFE i.e. both mechanical and endocrine (hormone-related) factors. Skeletal changes may also make someone at risk of SCFE, including femoral or acetabular retroversion, those these may simply be chronic skeletal manifestations of childhood obesity.

== Pathophysiology ==
SCFE is a Salter-Harris type 1 fracture (fracture through the physis or growth plate) through the proximal femoral physis, which can be distinguished from other Salter-Harris type 1 fractures by identifying prior epiphysiolysis, an intact (in chronic SCFE) or partially torn (in acute SCFE) periosteum, and the displacement being slower. Stress around the hip causes a shear force to be applied at the growth plate, with metaphysis anteriorly translating and externally rotating, while epiphysis remains within acetabulum.

An intrinsic weakness in the physis with a high axial load is the hypothesized mechanism. Obesity is the most important predisposing factor in the development of SCFE (working by increasing axial load). The physis being more vertical and weak, perichondrial ring being thin and unlocking of interlocking mamillary processes - in adolescence - contributes to high incidence. The condition is also more common in boys.

The fracture occurs at the hypertrophic zone of the physeal cartilage. Stress on the hip causes the epiphysis to move posteriorly and medially, relative to the metaphysis. Although it is not the epiphysis that displaced, by convention, position and alignment in SCFE is described by referring to the relationship of the proximal fragment (capital femoral epiphysis) to the normal distal fragment (femoral neck). Because the physis has yet to close, the blood supply to the epiphysis still should be derived from the femoral neck; however, this late in childhood, the supply is tenuous and frequently lost after the fracture occurs. Manipulation of the fracture (as in an attempted reduction, especially a forceful one) frequently results in osteonecrosis and the acute loss of articular cartilage (chondrolysis) because of the tenuous nature of the blood supply.

== Diagnosis ==
The diagnosis is a combination of clinical suspicion plus radiological investigation. Children with a SCFE experience a decrease in their range of motion, and are often unable to complete hip flexion or fully rotate the hip inward. 20–50% of SCFE are missed or misdiagnosed on their first presentation to a medical facility. SCFEs may be initially overlooked, because the first symptom is knee pain, referred from the hip. The knee is investigated and found to be normal.

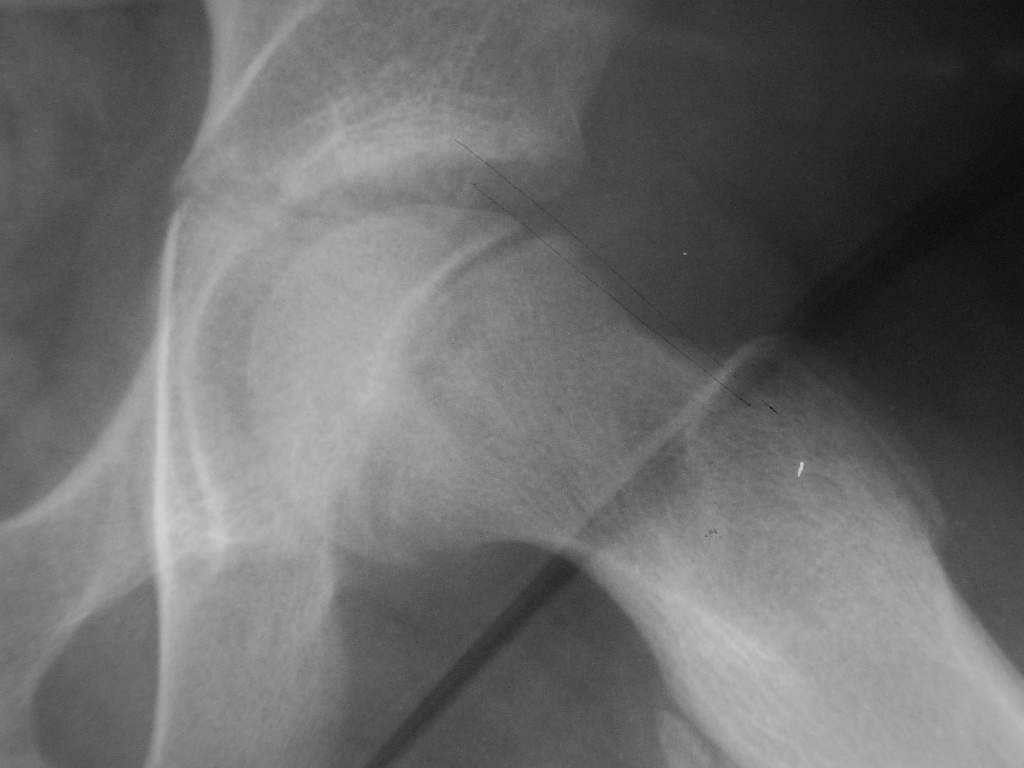

The diagnosis requires x-rays of the pelvis, with anteriorposterior (AP) and frog-leg lateral views. The appearance of the head of the femur in relation to the shaft likens that of a "melting ice cream cone", visible with Klein's line. The severity of the disease can be measured using the Southwick angle.

=== Classification ===
- Atypical/Typical
- Loder classification
  - Stable
  - Unstable, practically defined as when the patient is unable to ambulate even with crutches
- Temporal
  - Acute
  - Chronic
  - Acute-on-chronic
- Radiological
  - Grade I = 0–33% slippage
  - Grade II = 34–50% slippage
  - Grade III = >50% slippage

== Treatment ==
The disease can be treated with external in-situ pinning or open reduction and pinning. Consultation with an orthopaedic surgeon is necessary to repair this problem. Pinning the unaffected side prophylactically is not recommended for most patients, but may be appropriate if a second SCFE is very likely.

Once SCFE is suspected, the patient should be non-weight bearing and remain on strict bed rest. In severe cases, after enough rest the patient may require physical therapy to regain strength and movement back to the leg. A SCFE is an orthopaedic emergency, as further slippage may result in occlusion of the blood supply and avascular necrosis (risk of 25 percent). Almost all cases require surgery, which usually involves the placement of one or two pins into the femoral head to prevent further slippage. The recommended screw placement is in the center of the epiphysis and perpendicular to the physis. Chances of a slippage occurring in the other hip are 20 percent within 18 months of diagnosis of the first slippage and consequently the opposite unaffected femur may also require pinning.

The risk of reducing this fracture includes the disruption of the blood supply to the bone. It has been shown in the past that attempts to correct the slippage by moving the head back into its correct position can cause the bone to die. Therefore the head of the femur is usually pinned 'as is'. A small incision is made in the outer side of the upper thigh and metal pins are placed through the femoral neck and into the head of the femur. A dressing covers the wound.

== Epidemiology ==
SCFE affects approximately 1–10 per 100,000 children. The incidence varies by geographic location, season of the year, and ethnicity. In eastern Japan, the incidence is 0.2 per 100,000 and in the northeastern U.S. it is about 10 per 100,000. Africans and Polynesians have higher rates of SCFE.

SCFEs are most common in adolescents 11–15 years of age, and affects boys more frequently than girls (male 2:1 female). It is strongly linked to obesity, and weight loss may decrease the risk. Other risk factors include: family history, endocrine disorders, radiation / chemotherapy, and mild trauma.

The left hip is more often affected than the right. Over half of cases may have involvement on both sides (bilateral).

== See also ==
- Legg–Calvé–Perthes syndrome – another cause of avascular necrosis of the femoral head, seen in younger children than SCFE
- Hip dysplasia
- Drehmann sign – Clinical test examining for SCFE
