= Wineham =

Hamlet in West Sussex, England

Coordinates: 50.96375°N 0.24098°W

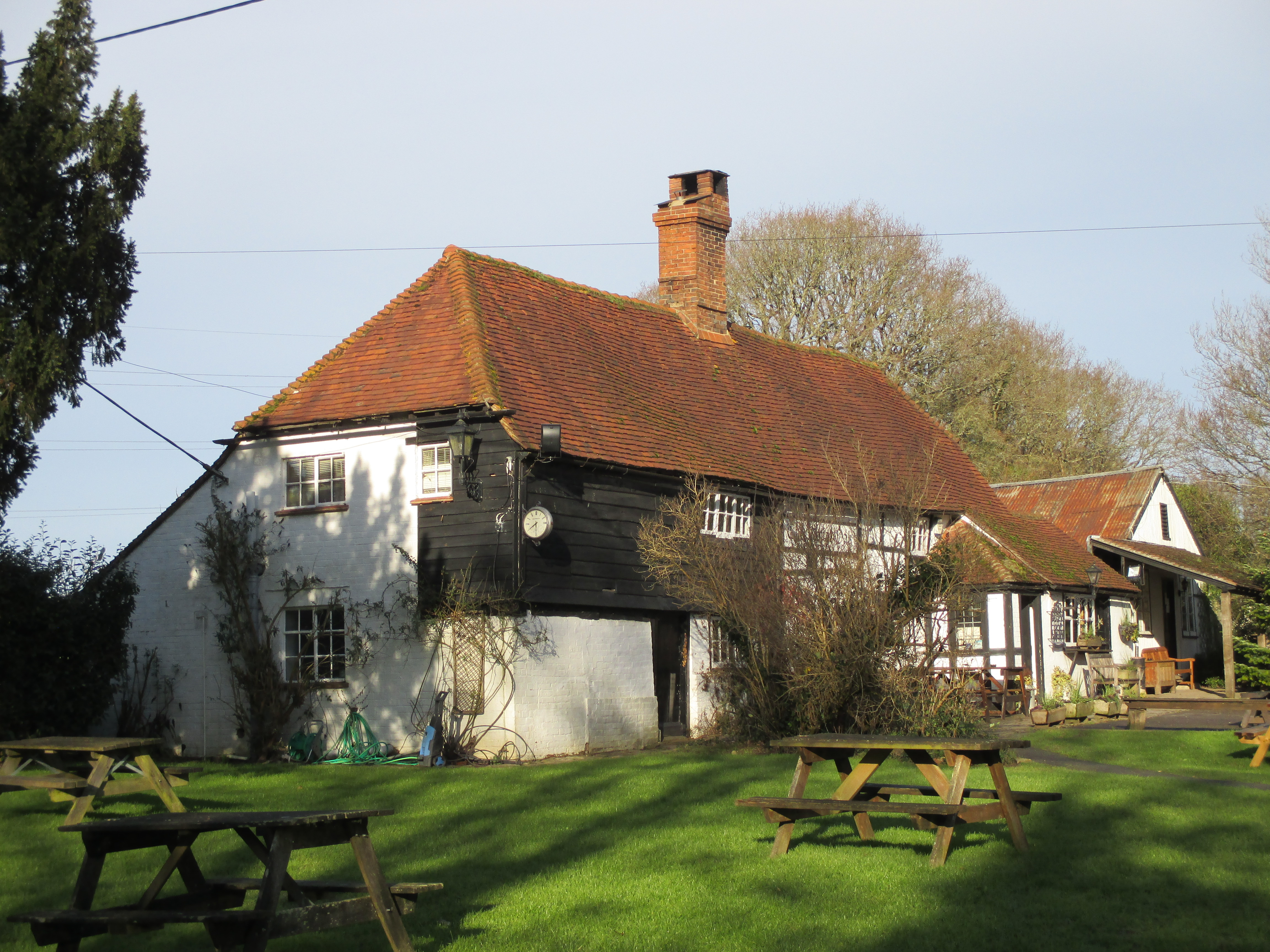
- The Royal Oak Inn, Wineham

- Location within West Sussex
- OS grid reference: TQ236197
- Civil parish: Shermanbury
- District: Horsham
- Shire county: West Sussex
- Region: South East
- Country: England
- Sovereign state: United Kingdom
- Post town: HENFIELD
- Postcode district: BN5
- Dialling code: 01444
- Police: Sussex
- Fire: West Sussex
- Ambulance: South East Coast
- UK Parliament: Arundel and South Downs

Wineham /wɪnəm/ is a hamlet mainly in the Shermanbury civil parish (and the same ecclesiastical parish) of the Horsham district of West Sussex, England. It is south of the A272 road, and approximately 2.5 miles (4 km) northeast of Henfield. Historically called Wyndham the settlement has one public house, the Royal Oak.

At Wyndham, usually called Wineham in the 20th century perhaps by assimilation to neighbouring Twineham, the houses are strung out on both sides of the road but mostly on the west, those on the east being in Twineham parish. Wyndham hospital, founded in the 13th century, may have been near that road 0.25 miles (0.40 km) north of Frylands Lane, where the site was recorded in the 1870s, or the same stretch further north, where hospital field lies behind the Royal Oak; no trace of the building has been found. The hospital had a church and a graveyard, and was presumably the place in Wyndham where an inquisition was held in about 1300.

Wyndham Pool, Wineham, is a small house of the late 16th century with a smoke bay into which a chimney was later built.
