= Southwick angle =

Radiographic angle

A Southwick angle is a radiographic angle used to measure the severity of a slipped capital femoral epiphysis (SCFE) on a radiograph. It was named after Wayne O. Southwick, a famous surgeon.

The angle is measured on a frog lateral view of the bilateral hips. It is measured by drawing a line perpendicular to a line connecting two points at the posterior and anterior tips of the epiphysis at the physis. A third line is drawn down the axis of femur. The angle between the perpendicular line and the femoral shaft line is the angle. The angle is measured bilaterally. The slipped side is then subtracted from the normal side. The number calculated determines the severity. Mild is classified by < 30°. Moderate is 30°-50°. Severe is >50°. 12° is the normal control value and can be used in the case of bilateral involvement.
