= Rudgwick railway station =

Former railway station in England

Coordinates: 51.0897°N 0.4509°W

Rudgwick

General information
- Location: Rudgwick, Horsham, West Sussex; England
- Grid reference: TQ085334
- Platforms: 1

Other information
- Status: Disused

History
- Pre-grouping: London, Brighton and South Coast Railway
- Post-grouping: Southern Railway; Southern Region of British Railways

Key dates
- November 1865: Opened
- 14 June 1965: Closed
Location

Rudgwick railway station was on the Cranleigh Line. It served the village of Rudgwick in West Sussex until June, 1965.

== History ==
Rudgwick station opened in November 1865, one month after the rest of the stations on the line, due to objections made by the Board of Trade's Colonel Yolland following the obligatory inspection of the line on 2 May in that year.

Yolland objected to the station being on a 1 in 80 gradient, which he considered dangerously steep as it might, in his opinion, result in trains calling at the station running away back down the slope. (In 1865 continuous brakes for railway trains did not yet exist.) He refused to authorise the opening of the station to traffic until the incline had been reduced to a 1 in 130. The works required were complex as the embankment leading into the station included a partly built bridge carrying the line over the River Arun, which had to be raised by 10 feet (3 m).

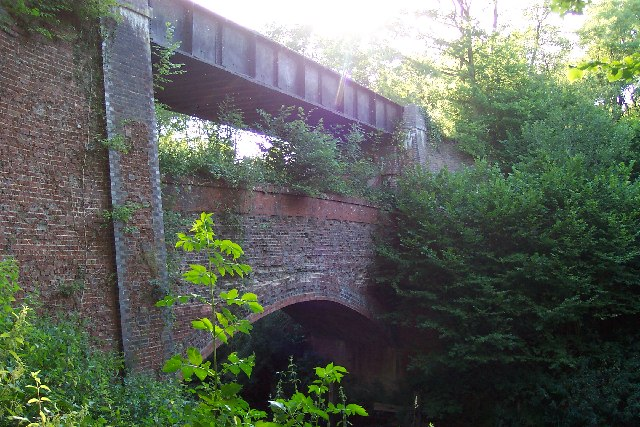
The Bridge over a Bridge in 2005

The railway company had no choice but to carry out the remedial works as it was contractually obliged to provide the station; the local landowner had sold the railway his land subject to this condition. The solution was to raise the partly built embankments, leaving the brick arch which was under construction as a flying buttress to a new plate girder bridge which the LBSCR now set about building. The result of these works was a "bridge over a bridge".

The line at the station was single track. The station had a single platform with a shelter and a small goods yard centred on a wagon turntable. At the southern end of the station was a road bridge (now Church Street B2128) leading to the nearby Marlet Hotel.

The line was closed in 1965 following The Reshaping of British Railways report of 1963, and afterwards the station was demolished leaving the trackbed and bridge in situ. In the 1980s the trackbed was made part of the Downs Link, a footpath linking the North Downs and South Downs National Trails. A few years ago the local authority installed a viewing platform near the "bridge over a bridge" to allow the public to inspect this unusual structure more closely. Rudgwick Medical Centre has been built on the site of the station's main building.

Preceding station	Disused railways	Following station
Baynards; Line and station closed	London, Brighton and South Coast Railway; Horsham and Guildford Direct Railway	Slinfold; Line and station closed

== Other stations ==
- Guildford
- Bramley & Wonersh
- Baynards
- Cranleigh
- Slinfold
- Christs Hospital
- Horsham

== See also ==
- List of closed railway stations in Britain
