= Slinfold railway station =

Former railway station in England

Coordinates: 51.0676°N 0.4129°W

Slinfold
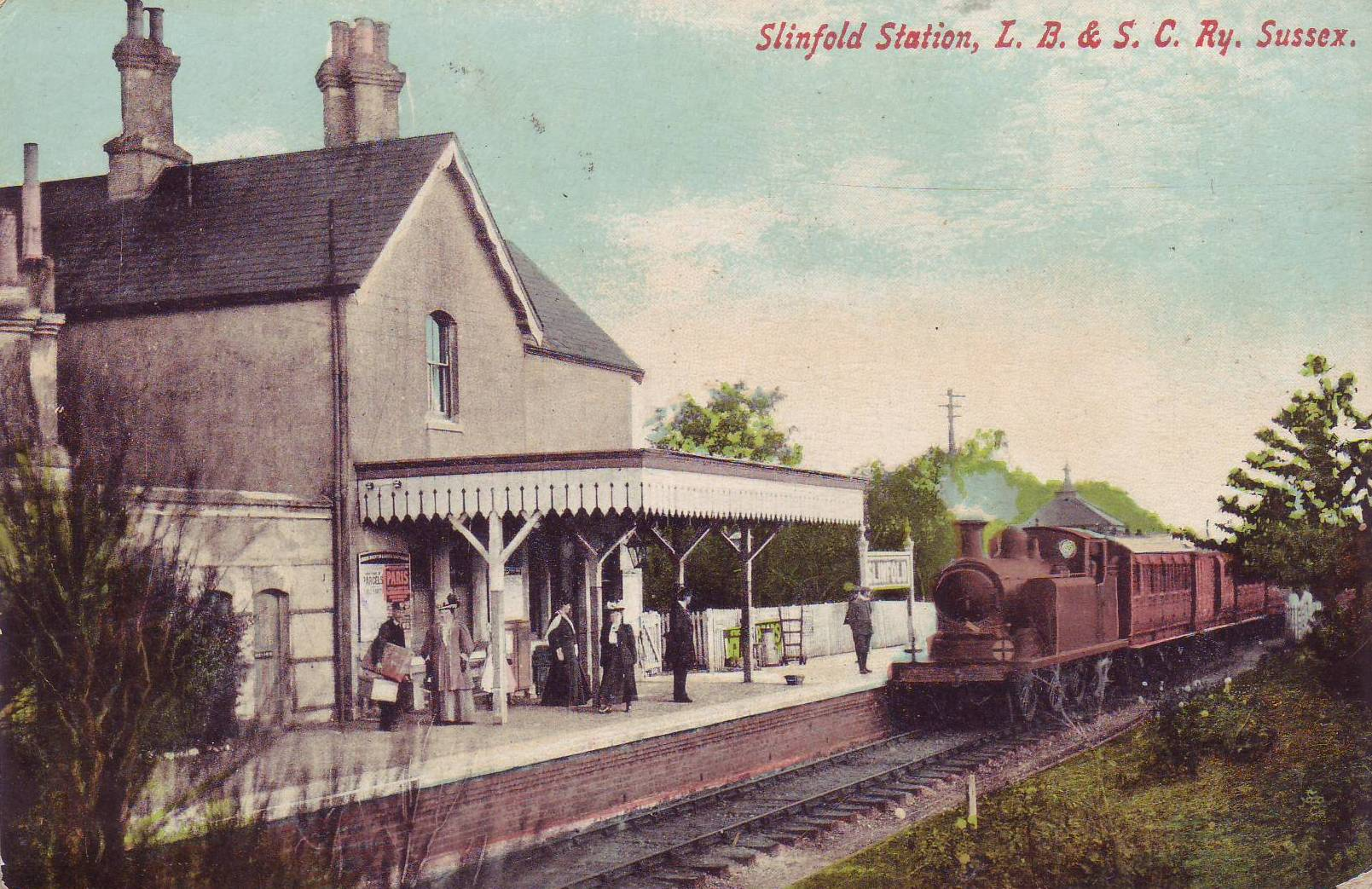
- Slinfold station, c.1910

General information
- Location: Slinfold, Horsham, West Sussex; England
- Grid reference: TQ113310
- Platforms: 1

Other information
- Status: Disused

History
- Pre-grouping: London, Brighton and South Coast Railway
- Post-grouping: Southern Railway; Southern Region of British Railways

Key dates
- 2 October 1865: Opened
- 1962: Closed to freight
- 14 June 1965: Closed to passengers
Location

Slinfold railway station was on the Cranleigh Line and served the village of Slinfold in West Sussex.

== History ==
The line had a single track and opened on 2 October 1865. The station had a single platform and a small goods yard facility. At one time it had three private sidings serving a brickworks (later Duke and Ockendens) and a timber yard (later Randalls Ladders).

The line was closed in 1965 following The Reshaping of British Railways report of 1963. Slinfold station was demolished and a caravan park now stands on the site. Two LBSCR houses remain on the far side of the level crossing.

Preceding station	Disused railways	Following station
Rudgwick; Line and station closed	London, Brighton and South Coast Railway; Horsham and Guildford Direct Railway	Christs Hospital; Line closed, station open

== Other Cranleigh Line stations ==
- Guildford
- Bramley & Wonersh
- Cranleigh
- Baynards
- Rudgwick
- Christs Hospital
- Horsham

== See also ==
- List of closed railway stations in Britain
