= Cranleigh line =

Former railway line in South East England

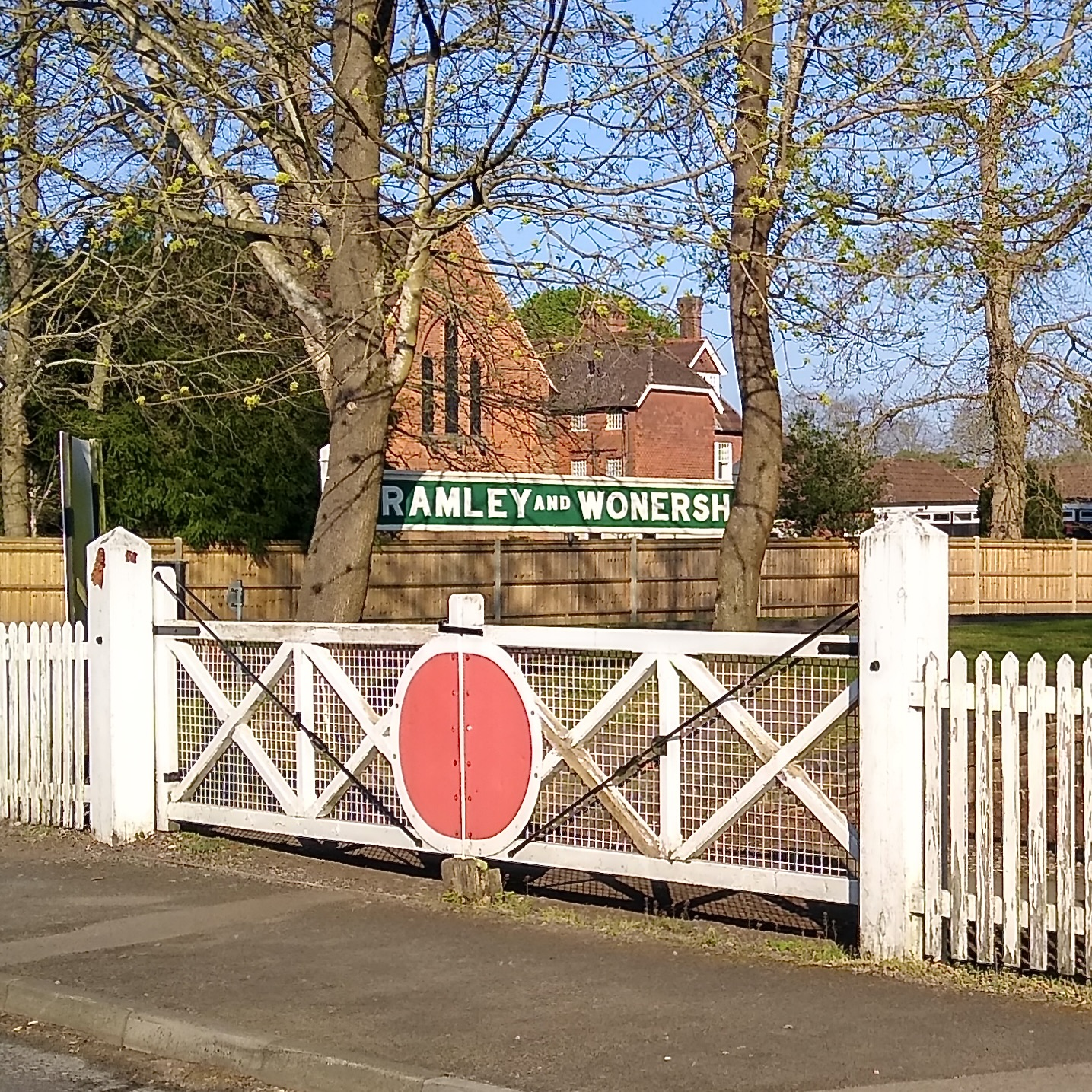
- Bramley and Wonersh station and replica level crossing gates in 2025

Overview
- Status: Closed
- Locale: Surrey, West Sussex
- Termini: Peasmarsh Junction; Christ's Hospital
- Stations: 6

Service
- Type: Heavy rail
- Services: Guildford–Horsham

History
- Opened: 2 October 1865
- Closed: 14 June 1965

Technical
- Line length: 15 mi 48 ch (25.1 km)
- Number of tracks: 1
- Track gauge: 1,435 mm (4 ft 8 1/2 in) standard gauge
- Electrification: None
Route map
- For clarity, not all lines north of Guildford and north of Horsham are shown. The tunnels south of Guildford on the Portsmouth Direct line are also omitted.

The Cranleigh line was a railway line in South East England that connected Guildford in Surrey with Horsham in West Sussex. It ran for 15 miles 48 chains (25.1 km) from Peasmarsh Junction on the Portsmouth Direct line to Stammerham Junction at Christ's Hospital station on the Arun Valley line. It served the villages of Bramley, Cranleigh, Rudgwick and Slinfold. The line was never electrified and was single track with passing loops at Bramley & Wonersh, Cranleigh and Baynards stations.

Construction of the line was started in 1860 by the independent Horsham and Guildford Direct Railway, which was acquired by the London, Brighton and South Coast Railway (LB&SCR) in June 1864. The first passenger services ran on 2 October 1865, although remedial works to ease the gradient north of the River Arun crossing delayed the opening of Rudgwick station until the following month. Christ's Hospital station was opened on 1 May 1902.

The railway was never financially successful and there were never more than nine return passenger services on weekdays. Freight services were suspended during the 1955 railway workers' strike and never recovered thereafter. The public goods yards closed in October 1962. The line was listed for closure in the 1963 Beeching report, and passenger services were withdrawn on 14 June 1965.

Platforms remain in situ at Bramley & Wonersh, Baynards and Christ's Hospital, but the stations at Cranleigh, Rudgwick and Slinfold were completely demolished. The 381 yd-long (348 m) Baynards Tunnel, where the line crossed the county boundary between Surrey and West Sussex, was bricked up at both ends and the cutting on the north side was infilled. Much of the route now forms part of the Downs Link path, which connects the North Downs Way at St Martha's Hill to the South Downs Way near Shoreham-by-Sea.

== Route ==
The Cranleigh line was a standard-gauge railway line in South East England. It ran for 15 miles 48 chains (25.1 km) from Peasmarsh Junction on the Portsmouth Direct line to Stammerham Junction at Christ's Hospital station on the Arun Valley line. The line was single track throughout and, on its opening in 1865, there was only one passing loop at Baynards station, the approximate half-way point. Additional passing loops were added at Bramley & Wonersh and Cranleigh stations in 1876 and 1880 respectively.

By the end of 1865, there were five operational stations on the line—at Bramley & Wonersh, Cranleigh, Baynards, Rudgwick and Slinfold. Initially only Baynards had two platforms, with the remainder having only one each. Bramley & Wonersh and Cranleigh each gained a second platform when their passing loops were installed. Christ's Hospital station opened in 1902 to serve the school of the same name and an expected local housing development. It was provided with five platform roads and seven platform faces, of which two roads and three faces served the Cranleigh line. The route was never electrified, although an outline proposal to install third rail on the section north of Cranleigh was put forward by the Southern Railway in the early 1930s.

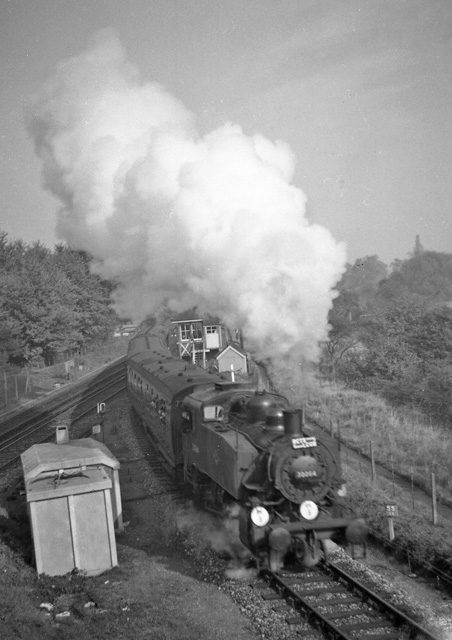
An SR USA class tank engine turns onto the Cranleigh line at Peasmarsh Junction in 1964.

The Cranleigh line diverged from the Portsmouth Direct line at Peasmarsh Junction, around 1 3/4 mi (2.8 km) south of Guildford station, on a 1/4 mi (400 m) curve with a minimum radius of 12 chains (790 ft; 240 m). When it opened, the junction was controlled by a signal box operated by the London and South Western Railway (LSWR) and had two diverging tracks, which merged into one at a second signal box, operated by the London, Brighton and South Coast Railway (LB&SCR). In 1926, Peasmarsh Junction was altered to a single lead, allowing the abolition of the LB&SCR box, with the former LSWR box controlling all movements between the branch and the main line.

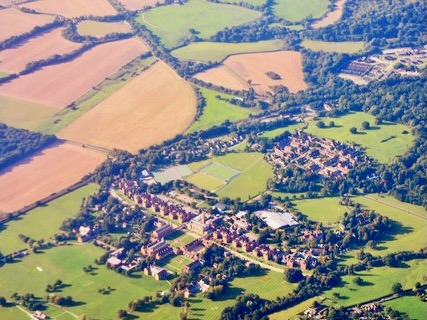
The former triangular junction between the Cranleigh line and the Arun Valley line (upper centre)

At Stammerham Junction, the Cranleigh line diverged from the Arun Valley line via a 1/2 mi (800 m) west–north curve with a minimum radius of 26 chains (1,700 ft; 520 m). On opening in 1865, a west–south spur was also provided, described by the railway historian, J. T. Howard Turner, as the "Itchingfield South Fork", which allowed trains to run from Guildford to the Sussex coast without the need for a reversal. No regular scheduled services were timetabled over the spur and the track had been lifted by August 1867. The embankment over which the Itchingfield South Fork ran was levelled by ploughing in the mid-20th century and its course is only visible as a field boundary and drainage ditch.

On opening, the Cranleigh line crossed two navigable waterways. The Godalming Navigation, the stretch of the River Wey between Guildford and Godalming, was crossed at Peasmarsh. The Wey and Arun Canal, which the line paralleled from Peasmarsh to Cranleigh, was crossed on an iron girder viaduct at Whipley Manor. (Note: The Cranleigh line crossed the Wey and Arun Canal at an oblique angle on an iron girder viaduct designed by Callcott Reilly, who was working as Edward Woods's assistant at the time. Reilly presented a paper to the Institution of Civil Engineers about the bridge, and a similar structure on the Central Argentine Railway, and was awarded a Telford Medal as a result.) The Wey bridge was demolished when the line closed, but was reinstated in July 2006 for the use of cyclists, horse riders and pedestrians. The canal bridge was also dismantled in the late 1960s and was replaced by a causeway.

The line crossed the county boundary from Surrey to West Sussex inside the 381 yd-long (348 m) Baynards Tunnel, also called "Rudgwick Tunnel". The tunnel was built on a downhill gradient of 1 in 100 (10 ‰) from north to south and suffered from condensation and water ingress. Locomotives frequently experienced poor rail head conditions and there are several reports of freight trains being brought to a stand inside due to wheelslip.

The original intention was for the railway to cross the unnavigable River Arun by a brick arch bridge, but an inspection carried out before the line opened determined that the 1 in 80 (12.5 ‰) gradient on the southern approach to Rudgwick station was too steep for trains to operate safely. The gradient was eased to 1 in 130 (7.7 ‰) by raising the embankment, requiring a plate-girder deck to be installed 10 ft (3.0 m) above the original brick arch. The works delayed the opening of Rudgwick station by one month.

By 1911, signal boxes were in operation at all six stations on the Cranleigh line. South of Baynards, the line was worked using the staff and ticket system, but the northern part of the line used electric tokens instead.

Stations on the Cranleigh line (ordered from north to south)
Station	Distance from Horsham	Number of platform roads in 1965	Opening date	Original name	Ref.
Bramley & Wonersh	16 mi 15 ch (26.1 km)	2 (originally 1)	2 October 1865	Bramley	
Cranleigh	11 mi 19 ch (18.1 km)	2 (originally 1)	2 October 1865	Cranley	
Baynards	8 mi 27 ch (13.4 km)	2	2 October 1865		
Rudgwick	7 mi 9 ch (11.4 km)	1	1 November 1865		
Slinfold	4 mi 67 ch (7.8 km)	1	2 October 1865		
Christ's Hospital	2 mi 31 ch (3.8 km)	4 (2 for Cranleigh line)	1 May 1902	Christ's Hospital West Horsham	

== History ==
=== Proposals and authorisation ===
The first proposal to link Horsham to Guildford by rail was presented to the board of the London and South Western Railway (LSWR) in September 1846, but the company declined to support the initiative. (Note: The LSWR began operating passenger services to Guildford on 5 May 1845.) Over a decade later, in the summer of 1859, two separate schemes to link west Surrey and north-west Sussex were put forward. The first, promoted by an independent company, was to link Guildford and Horsham, while the second, conceived by a group associated with the Wey and Arun Canal, sought to link Guildford to Pulborough. The latter scheme failed to make progress, but by February 1860, the increasing likelihood of the Guildford–Horsham line being constructed prompted the London, Brighton and South Coast Railway (LB&SCR) to formally oppose it. The LB&SCR, which had begun operating trains from Horsham in February 1848, feared that the new line would allow the LSWR to compete for traffic between Sussex and London.

Horsham and Guildford Direct Railway Act 1860
- Act of Parliament
- Parliament of the United Kingdom
- Long title: An Act for making a Railway from the Mid-Sussex Railway to the Godalming Branch of the London and South-western Railway at Guildford, to be called "The Horsham and Guildford Direct Railway."
- Citation: 23 & 24 Vict. c. clxxx

Dates
- Royal assent: 6 August 1860

Text of statute as originally enacted

In spite of the LB&SCR's initial opposition, the promoters of the Guildford–Horsham scheme offered the company the rights to work the new line. The arrangement was formally agreed on 21 June 1860 and, less than two months later, on 6 August, the Horsham and Guildford Direct Railway Act 1860 (23 & 24 Vict. c. clxxx) was granted royal assent. The act allowed the LB&SCR to contribute up to £75,000 (equivalent to £8.9 million in 2023) to the capital requirements of the new line, which was to be built by the Horsham and Guildford Direct Railway (HGDR) company.

Later that year, the HGDR submitted a proposal to Parliament, requesting the right to work over the line between Woking and Godalming, which the LSWR opposed. Following negotiations concluded on 7 May 1861, the HGDR withdrew its bill, agreeing not to seek rights to run beyond Guildford. In exchange, the LSWR granted access to Guildford station, on the condition that the HGDR paid a proportion of the cost of providing any additional platforms required for its services.

Over the next three years, the LB&SCR began to exert increasing control of the HGDR. Three new directors of the HGDR were appointed on 8 March 1862, all of whom had an existing connection to the LB&SCR. Robert Jacomb-Hood, the Chief Engineer of the LB&SCR, was invited to take up the same position at the HGDR and, on 28 April that year, the company administration was transferred to the LB&SCR's offices. The two companies were formally amalgamated under the London, Brighton and South Coast Railway (Additional Powers) Act 1864 (27 & 28 Vict. c. cccxiv), with the merger taking effect on 29 June that year.

=== Construction and opening ===
The slow progress of agreeing access to Guildford station with the LSWR, delayed the start of the construction of the Cranleigh line. An initial survey of the route was completed by Edward Woods, who had been appointed Company Engineer by the HGDR in July 1860. Several changes were made to his scheme, including the construction of Baynards Tunnel, which was originally to have been a deep cutting. The board of directors was informed on 27 February 1862 that construction contracts had been let. Jacomb-Hood produced a second survey for the line that April, and Woods left the HGDR at around the same time.

The construction of the route was overseen by Frederick Banister, who was also an engineer working for the LB&SCR. On 12 February 1863, he raised concerns over slow progress and the following month he noted that the necessary land for the route between Guildford and Cranleigh had not yet been purchased. Nevertheless, track laying had begun by January 1864 and, in the same month, the contract for the construction of the five stations was awarded to John Perry for the cost of £3,698 (equivalent to £459,000 in 2023).

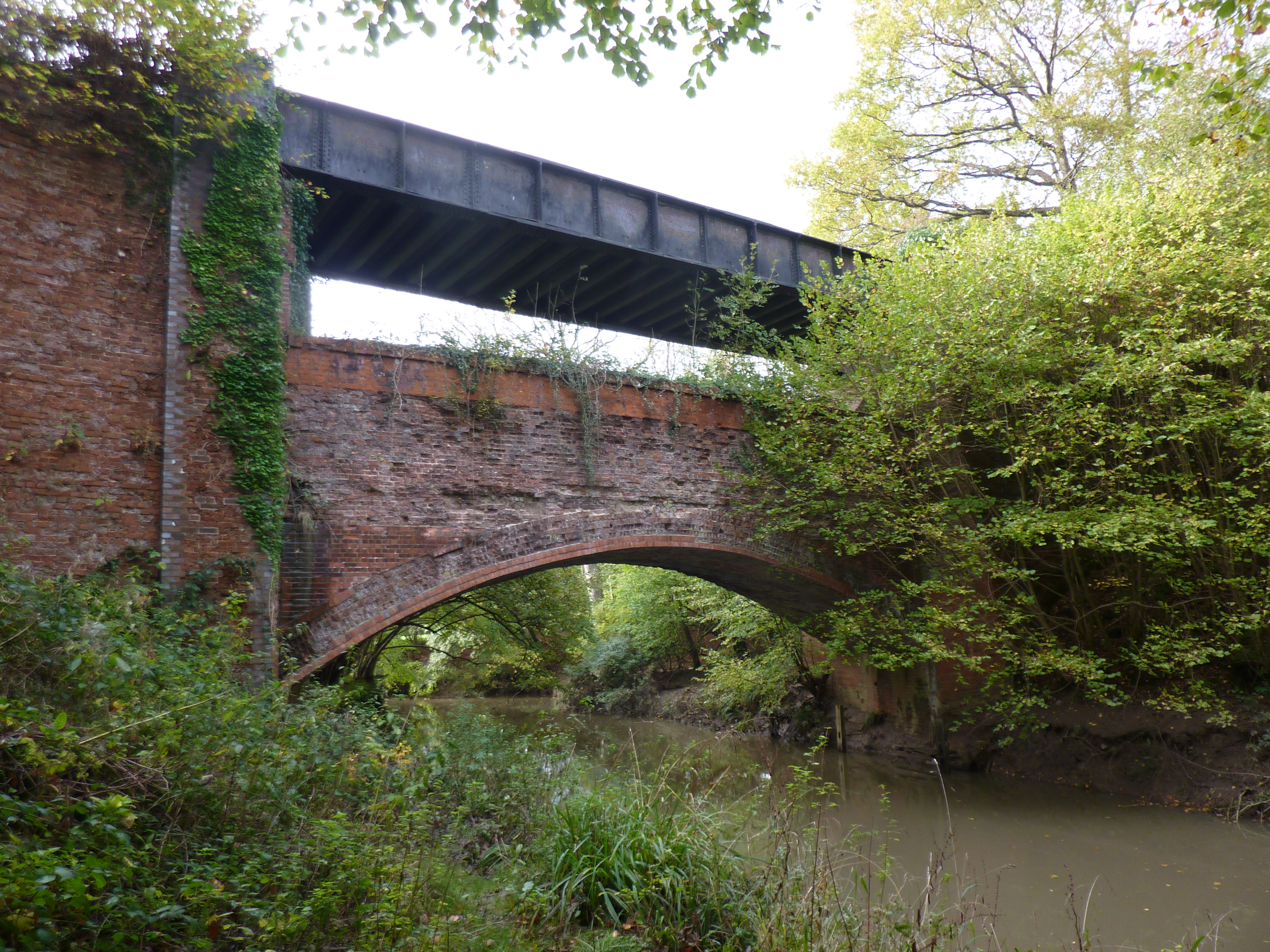
The bridge over the River Arun south of Rudgwick station

As the line was nearing completion, an inspection was undertaken by the Board of Trade (BoT). Although the LB&SCR had hoped to begin public passenger services by 1 June 1865, the opening was delayed several times due to unfinished work. The new railway finally opened on 2 October 1865, but William Yolland, the BoT representative charged with inspecting the route, insisted that Rudgwick station was to remain closed until the steep gradient of 1 in 80 (12.5 ‰) to the south was eased. The remedial work included the raising of embankments and a second bridge deck was added 10 ft (3.0 m) above the original brick arch over the River Arun, reducing the gradient to 1 in 130 (7.7 ‰). Rudgwick station opened on 1 November 1865.

In his inspection reports, Yolland had also expressed dissatisfaction with the method of working for Cranleigh line trains at Guildford. A plan to enlarge Guildford station was agreed between the LB&SCR and LSWR on 24 October 1865; the LB&SCR also committed to pay the latter a proportion of its gross receipts for operating over the 1 3/4 mi (2.8 km) stretch of line north of Peasmarsh Junction. However, over the next few years, disagreements over the LB&SCR's access rights grew. A permanent settlement was not reached until the late 1880s, when the company undertook to pay the LSWR an additional £600 per annum (equivalent to £87,700 in 2023), effective from January 1889.

=== Late 19th century ===
For much of its existence, the financial performance of the Cranleigh line was poor. The initial passenger service in each direction was four trains per day on weekdays in each direction and two trains on Sundays, but in October 1867, the timetable was reduced to only three return trains on weekdays. In the same year, the west–south spur to the Arun Valley line, which had never been used by scheduled services, was closed, eliminating any potential that the Cranleigh line might have had as a through route between the Midlands and the Sussex coast.

North of Cranleigh, the line paralleled the Wey and Arun Canal, which had experienced a short-term increase in income in the early 1860s, when it was used to transport building materials for the railway. (Note: The Wey and Arun Canal, which had opened on 29 September 1816, had been intended to provide a navigable inland route between London and the English Channel, by linking the River Wey to the River Arun. For the most part, it was used to transport coal and agricultural produce, and through traffic from the capital to the south coast was negligible. It was never financially successful and within four years of its opening, the share price for the canal company had fallen to half its initial value. In the mid-19th century, dividends dropped from £1 per share in 1828 to 5s in 1852.) Once the Cranleigh line had opened, the waterway became unprofitable and its gross receipts were reduced by 50%. The final dividend, 6s per share, was paid in 1865, and the following year, the board recommended that the canal company should be liquidated. (Note: The proposal to close the Wey and Arun Canal was contested not only by the waterway's shareholders, but also by the adjoining Godalming and Arun Navigation companies.) The waterway was formally abandoned in July 1871, under the terms of the Wey and Arun Junction Canal (Abandonment) Act 1868.

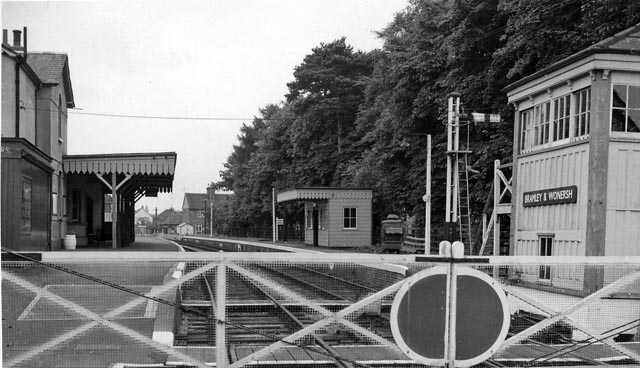
Bramley & Wonersh station in 1961

Towards the end of the century, developments on the northern half of the line prompted the LB&SCR to increase the service frequency. Two schools, Cranleigh School, Cranleigh, and St Catherine's School, Bramley, were established in 1865 and 1885 respectively. Passing loops and second platforms were installed at Bramley & Wonersh in 1876 and at Cranleigh in 1880, allowing up to seven trains per day to operate in each direction. In July 1880, the LB&SCR asked Frederick Banister, its company engineer, to develop a scheme to install a second track between Peasmarsh Junction and Bramley, which would have allowed a further increase in service frequency. No doubling took place and by February 1890, the timetable had been reduced to five trains per day in each direction between Horsham and Guildford, with a single short return working between Horsham and Cranleigh.

Two schemes for new railways serving Cranleigh were put forward at the end of the 19th century. Under the provisions of the Light Railways Act 1896, a line linking Ockley and Selham (near Midhurst) was proposed, but failed to attract support. Between 1897 and 1899, various routes for a branch from the Dorking and Holmwood areas to Cranleigh were suggested, but the railways were opposed by local residents, who feared that the LB&SCR was using the new schemes to block competition from the rival LSWR.

=== Early 20th century ===
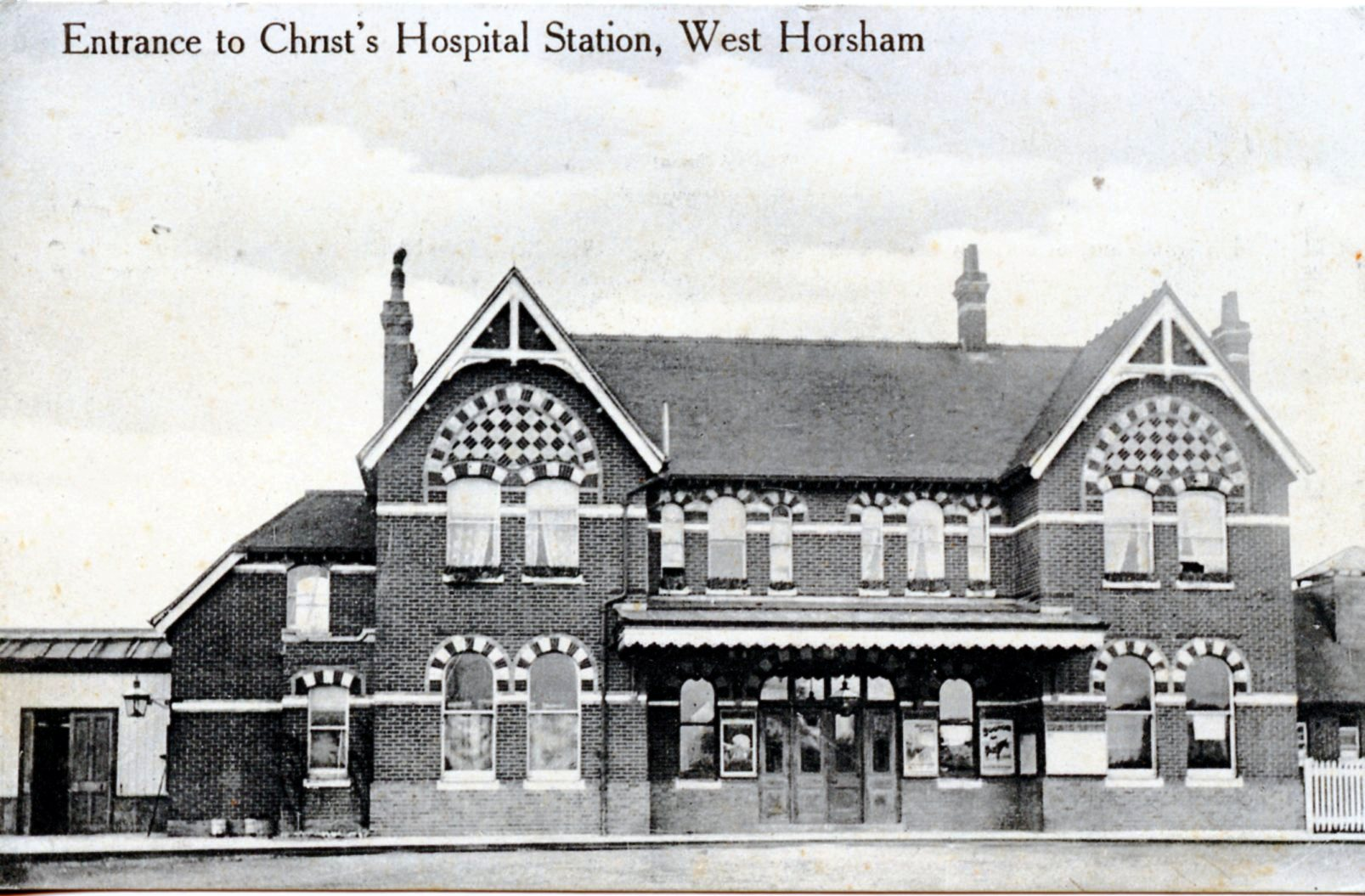
Christ's Hospital station c. 1910

The construction of Christ's Hospital school at the southern end of the line began in 1897, when the foundation stone was laid in a ceremony on 22 October by the future Edward VIII, then Prince of Wales. The school was to relocate from Newgate, London, where it had been founded in 1552. The Sussex site had previously been the 1,200-acre (490 ha) Aylesbury Dairy Farm, which had closed after the owner had declared bankruptcy.

The LB&SCR, which anticipated a large number of pupils travelling to the school every day, constructed new platforms at Stammerham Junction, where the Cranleigh line joined the Arun Valley line. (Note: A small wooden platform had been provided at Stammerham Junction in the late 19th century to load milk churns, but had not been used after the owner of Aylesbury Dairy Farm was made bankrupt.) The company also hoped to attract housing development to the area, and accordingly named the station "Christ's Hospital West Horsham". The new station, which had separate platforms for the two lines, opened on 1 May 1902. On 29 May, 800 pupils arrived by train to begin their education at the Sussex site. However, little additional rail traffic was generated for the railway, as the governors of Christ's Hospital elected to enrol boarders only and to not admit day pupils. The anticipated residential development also failed to materialise, in part because the school owned much of the land surrounding the station and did not release plots for housebuilding.

Other developments on the Cranleigh line in the early 20th century, included the installation of a new signal box at Rudgwick in 1911, which replaced the earlier signalling hut that had controlled access to the goods yard. The Sunday service on the line was withdrawn between 1917 and 1919 as a wartime economy measure. On 1 January 1923, the LB&SCR became part of the Southern Railway (SR). The formation of the SR allowed the rationalisation of infrastructure at Peasmarsh in 1926, where the former LB&SCR signal box was closed and the double-track junction with the Portsmouth Direct line was converted to a single-lead junction with a crossover. Competition for the line, in the form of a new bus service running between Guildford and Horsham, began on 9 April 1923. In the late 1930s, the northern part of the line was proposed for electrification, to allow London Waterloo to Guildford via Cobham & Stoke d'Abernon services to be extended to Cranleigh, but the scheme was not developed further.

=== Mid-20th century ===
During the Second World War, the line was available as an alternative route to the main lines from London and the Midlands to the Sussex coast, and signal boxes were staffed 24 hours a day to allow for emergency diversions. An ammunitions depot and an army camp for US forces, both served by rail, were established at Baynards Park. On 16 September 1942, eight people were killed when an enemy aircraft attacked a passenger train near Bramley & Wonersh station. Following the end of the war, the railways of the UK were nationalised under the Transport Act 1947 and the Cranleigh line became part of British Railways on 1 January 1948.

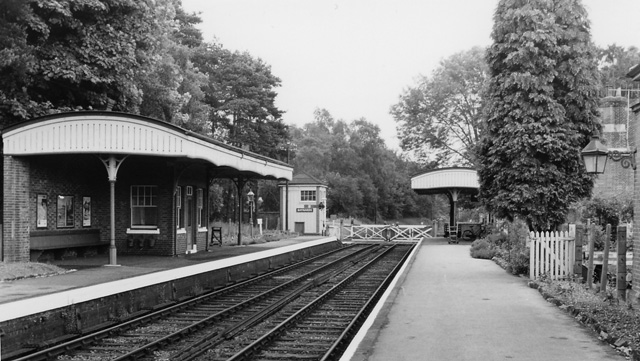
Baynards station in 1961

In the 1940s and 1950s, Baynards was used as a location for films and television. The station appeared in the 1942 comedy The Black Sheep of Whitehall and the 1945 melodrama They Were Sisters. Extensive use of the railway was made by the 1957 BBC television series The Railway Children based on the novel of the same name by E. Nesbit. Several sequences used an LSWR T9 class locomotive, which did not otherwise run on the line. Later filming at Baynards station included scenes for The Horsemasters (1961), (Note: Baynards station appears as "Valleywood" in the 1961 Disneyland TV show, The Horsemasters.) The Grass is Greener (1960) and Die, Monster, Die! (1965). Scenes for the 1965 comedy Rotten to the Core were filmed in the Cranleigh line platforms at Christ's Hospital using an N class locomotive, which was otherwise prohibited on the route. (Note: Christ's Hospital station appears as "Longhampton" in the 1965 comedy Rotten to the Core.)

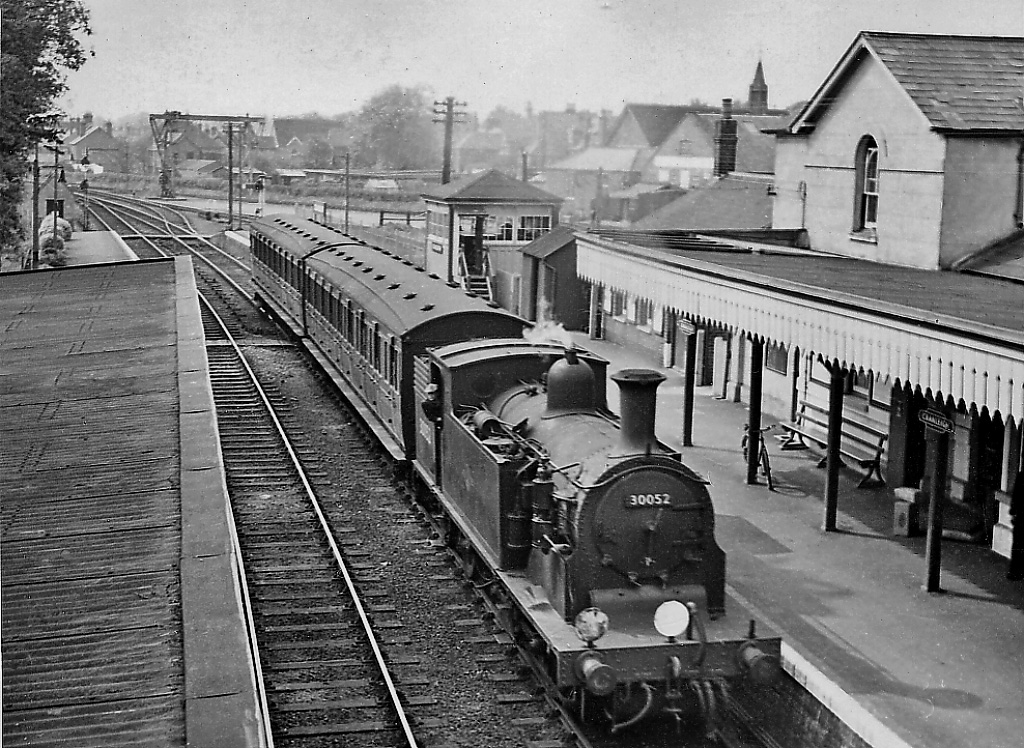
An LSWR M7 class locomotive at Cranleigh station in 1957

Developments on the Cranleigh line in the early 1950s included the introduction of railmotors, consisting of tank engines coupled to a type of passenger carriage, known as a balloon trailer. The train would be driven from the locomotive in one direction and, in the other, from a driving position at the front of the carriage. The 1953 timetable included eight services in each direction on the full length of the line on weekdays, with an additional early evening return from Guildford to Cranleigh, but the services were poorly timed for convenient connections at Guildford and Horsham.

All passenger services on the line were suspended during the strike by members of the Associated Society of Locomotive Engineers and Firemen in mid-1955. Freight traffic never recovered and the daily goods train serving Cranleigh Yard was withdrawn on 10 September 1962. Sunday passenger services were suspended from 8 November 1959 and were never reinstated. Horsham shed formally closed in June 1959, but the steam locomotives operating on the Cranleigh line continued to be serviced there until maintenance was transferred to Guildford shed on 15 June 1964.

=== Closure ===
The first Beeching report, published in 1963, recommended withdrawing all passenger services and the closure of all stations between Bramley & Wonersh and Slinfold inclusive. By this time, the line was running at a loss of £46,000 per year (equivalent to £1.22 million in 2023), and was being used by fewer than 5000 passengers each week. The official notice of closure was published by the British Railways Board that September, giving 11 November 1963 as the provisional date from which no trains would run. The board noted that the existing bus services, serving all settlements on the line except Baynards, would continue to run after the railway had closed.

A local campaign was launched in opposition to the Beeching plans, resulting in the postponement of the closure. Suggestions were made that a privately operated service could run on the northern part of the line using diesel trains. A public inquiry took place in Cranleigh on 10 March 1964, during which objectors noted that a planned programme of housebuilding would increase the village population by around 5000. In March the following year, the Minister of Transport ruled that the line should close on the condition that additional bus services were commissioned. Monday 14 June 1965 was given as the date from which no trains would run.

Since no Sunday service had operated on the Cranleigh line since November 1959, the final day of operation of public services on the line was Saturday 12 June 1965. The last train to depart from Christ's Hospital station was serenaded by boys from the school singing Abide with Me. An enthusiasts' special, which ran the full length of the route on Sunday 13 June 1965, was the final passenger train to operate on the Cranleigh line.

=== After closure ===
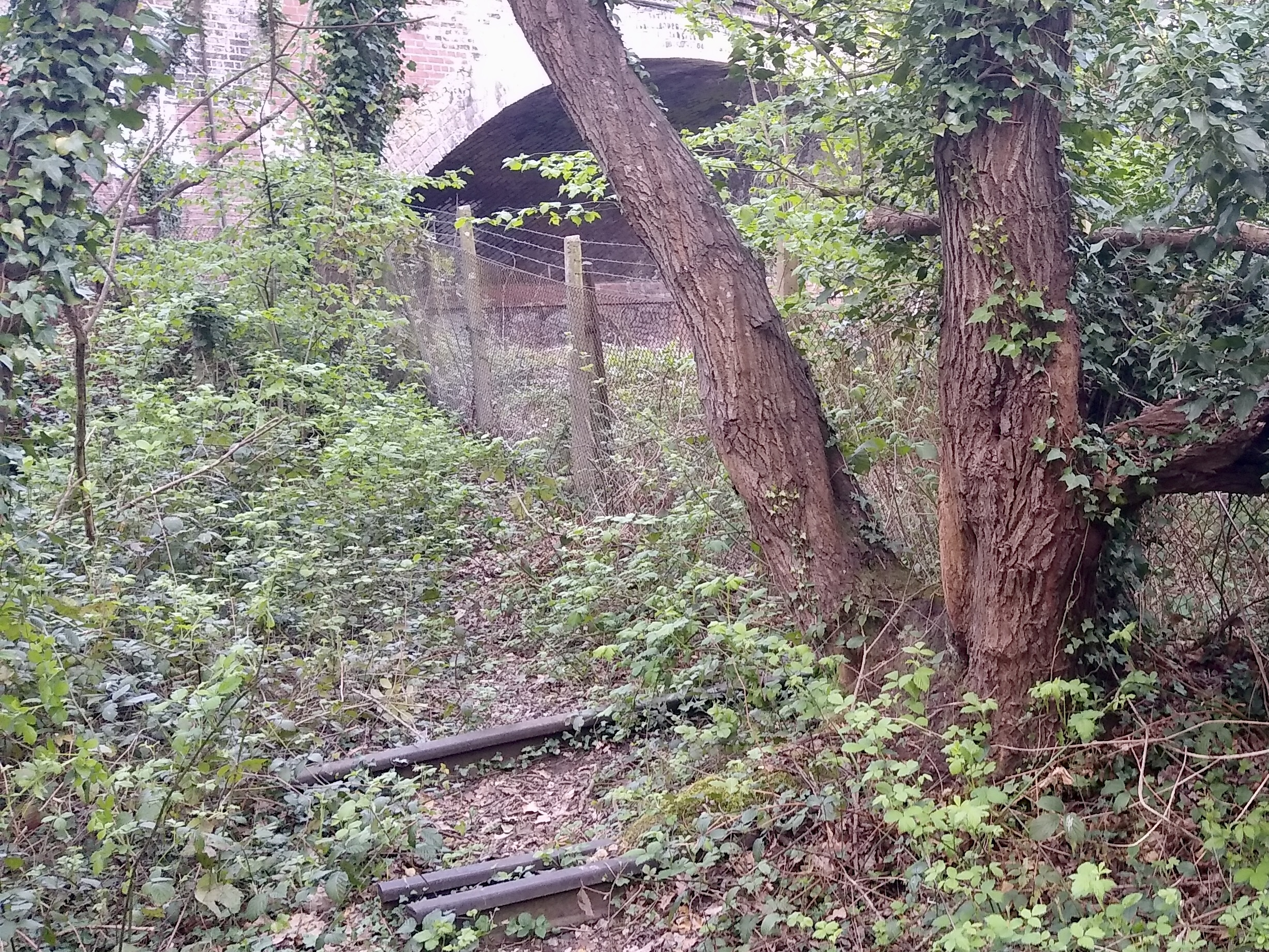
A short section of disused rail at Peasmarsh Junction in 2025: The brick arch in the background carries the A3100 over the Portsmouth Direct line.

The Horsham and Guildford Direct Railway Society (HGDRS) was formed in August 1965, with the aim of operating an hourly service on the line on weekdays. The group approached British Railways with an offer to lease the line for a period of five years, after which they would purchase it outright. The HGDRS's plans included the construction of additional halts at Grafham and Shamley Green, and tickets were to be sold on the trains. However, British Railways refused to lease the line to the society, instead offering to sell the whole railway, including the freehold for the stations, for £240,000 (equivalent to £5.87 million in 2023). Hambledon Rural District Council and Surrey County Council, which had been in favour of the reopening project, withdrew their support for the HGDRS scheme at the end of 1965.

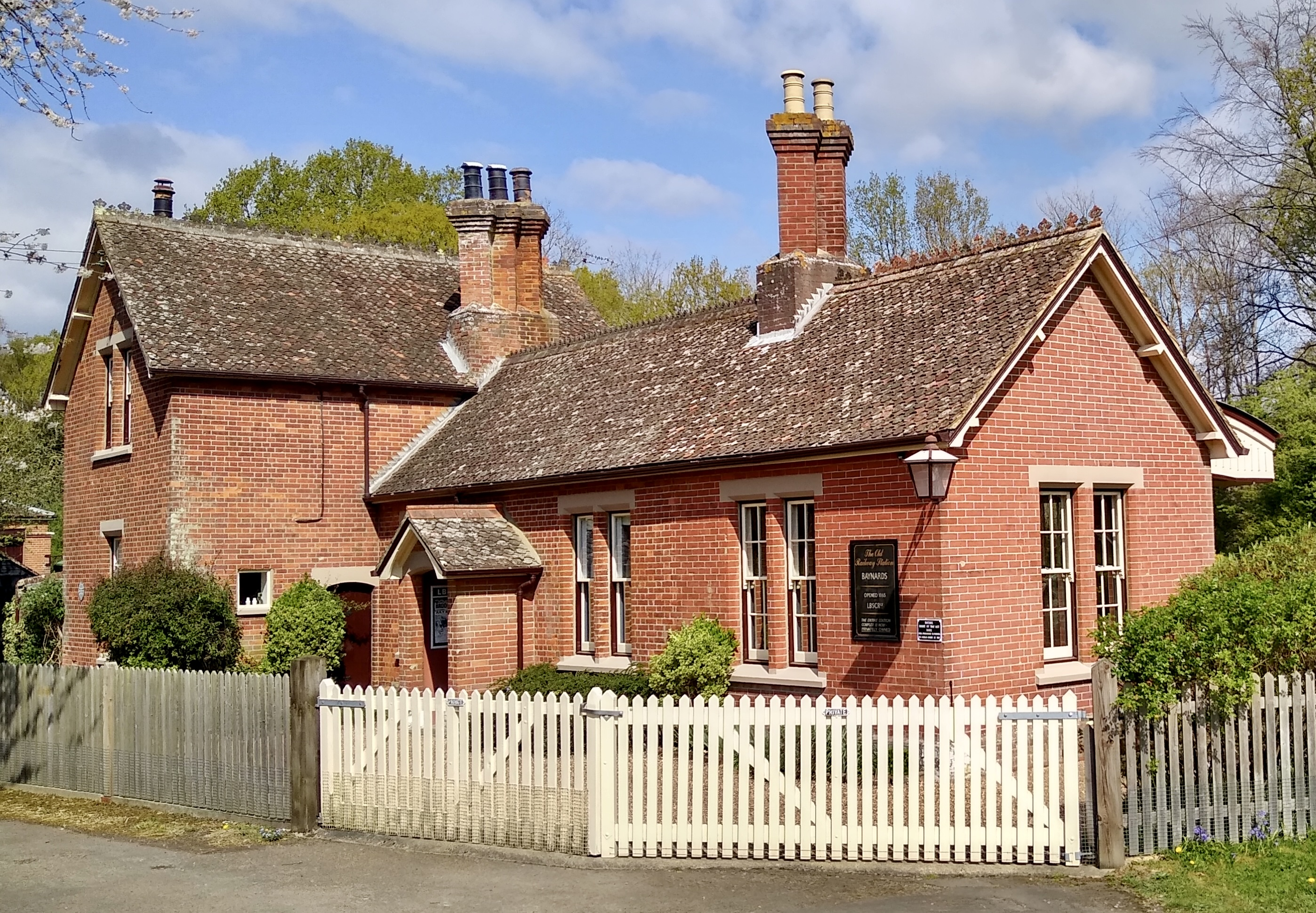
The former Baynards station building in 2025

Over the next few months, the track was lifted and, in April 1966, permission was given for the station site at Cranleigh to be used for the Stocklund Square shopping centre development and its associated car park. (Note: The Cranleigh station footbridge was removed and re-erected at Liss station in Hampshire.) That December, West Sussex County Council agreed to buy the trackbed from Christ's Hospital to the county boundary at Baynards. In April 1970, much of the route north of Baynards Tunnel was bought by Surrey County Council and Hambledon Rural District Council.

Although the station building at Bramley & Wonersh was demolished, the platforms were restored and replica level crossing gates were installed in a two-year project, completed in 2005. Since then, the station site has been part of the Bramley Conservation Area. The viaduct over the River Wey was dismantled, although the double bridge over the River Arun was left intact. Rudgwick and Slinfold stations were demolished and their sites are now occupied by a health centre and caravan park respectively. Baynards station was sold in 1973 and remains in private ownership.

Since 1990, there have been several proposals to reopen the line from Peasmarsh Junction to Cranleigh. The "Study into Rail Line Improvements in Surrey: Network South Central Operating Area", published by Surrey County Council in 1996, determined that reinstatement as a heavy-rail branch or as part of a light-rail system centred on Guildford, was feasible and would alleviate congestion on local roads. Connecting Communities: Expanding Access to the Rail Network, a report published by the Association of Train Operating Companies in June 2009, assessed the capital cost of reopening this section as £63 million (equivalent to £107 million in 2023), including stations at Bramley and Cranleigh. However, the "Surrey Rail Strategy", published by the county council in September 2013, determined that reinstatement north of Cranleigh was not viable and that passenger numbers "would be insufficient to justify the significant cost". Nevertheless, the Campaign for Better Transport advocacy group called for the reinstatement of the entirety of the line following the cancellation of the "Restoring Your Railway" programme by the UK government in mid-2024.

=== Downs Link ===
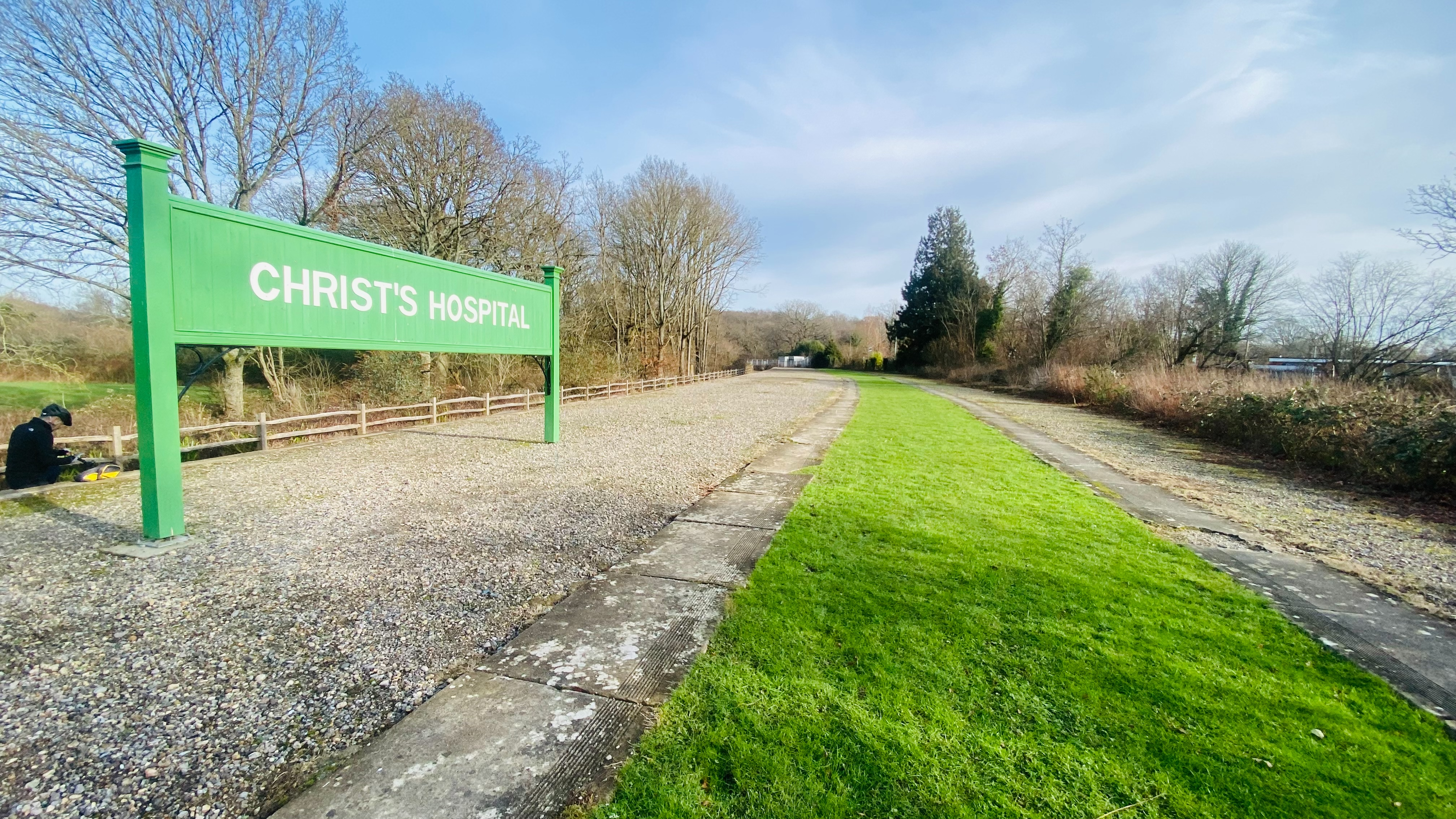
The restored Cranleigh line platforms on the Downs Link at Christ's Hospital station

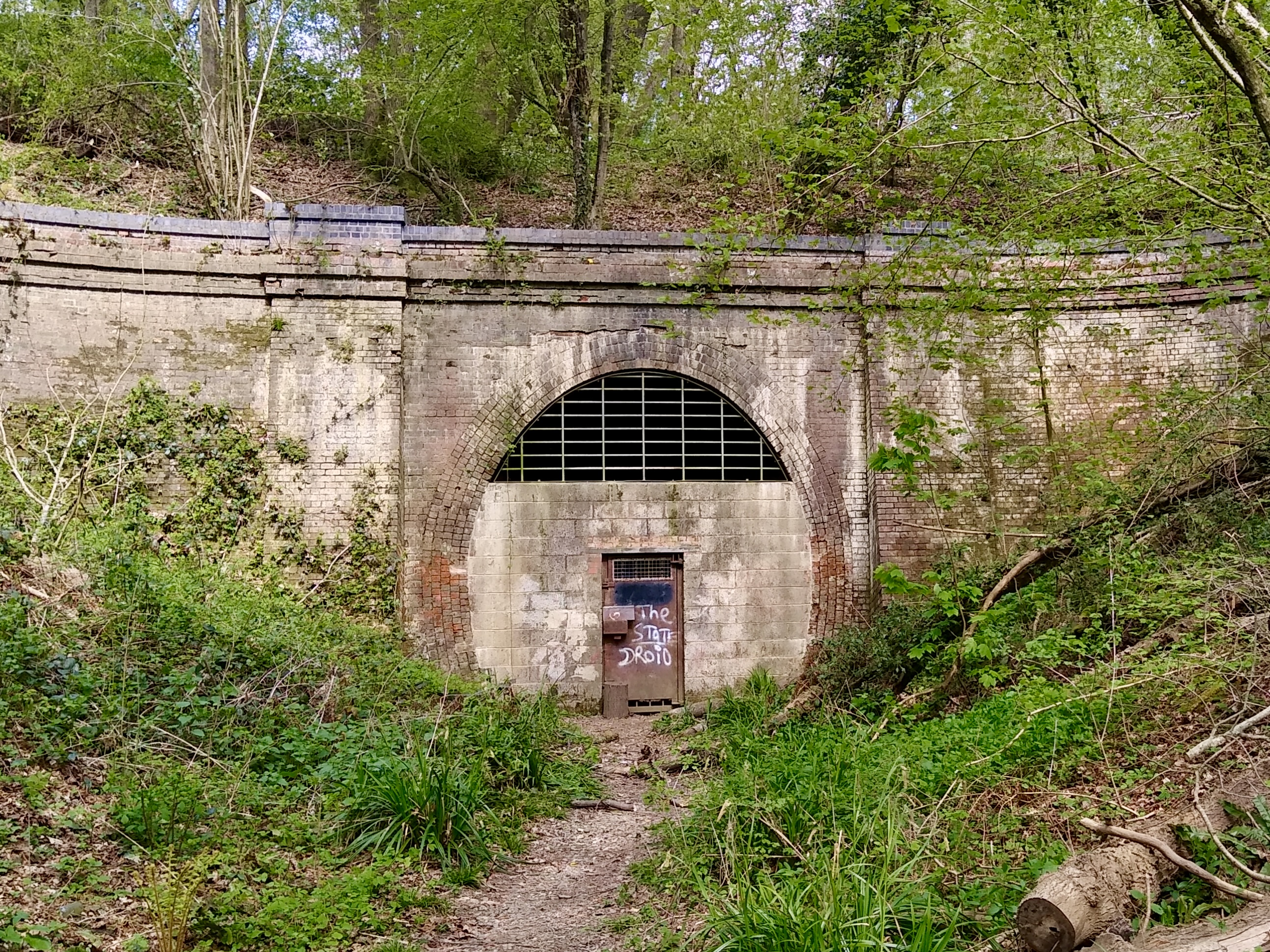
The bricked-up southern portal of Baynards Tunnel

Plans to convert the trackbed of the Cranleigh line to a mixed-use path for walkers, cyclists and horse riders began to emerge around a year after closure, when Hambledon Rural District Council suggested that the route should be turned into a "walking freeway". In 1973, it signed a seven-year lease on the part of the railway that had been purchased by Surrey County Council with the intention of creating a "greenway" between Gosden, north of Bramley, and the border with West Sussex. (Note: On 1 April 1974, Hambledon Rural District became part of Waverley District, which became the Borough of Waverley on 21 February 1984.) The works included sealing the entrances to Baynards Tunnel with concrete blocks and filling the cutting on the northern approach with inert waste to create a ramped access to Cox Green Road. A strip of land was purchased to enable the path to reach the county boundary, and drainage, fencing and landscaping works were also undertaken. The total cost of £15,000 (equivalent to £229,000 in 2023) was funded from the sale of Baynards station.

The Downs Link, joining the North Downs Way at St Martha's Hill to the South Downs Way at St Botolph's near Shoreham-by-Sea, was formally opened on 9 July 1984 at ceremonies at Baynards station and at the southern terminus of the new route. The path was a joint project between Surrey and West Sussex County Councils, and Waverley Borough Council. Although much of the former trackbed of the Cranleigh line was incorporated into the Downs Link, the sections of the railway through Peasmarsh and east of Slinfold were not initially included.

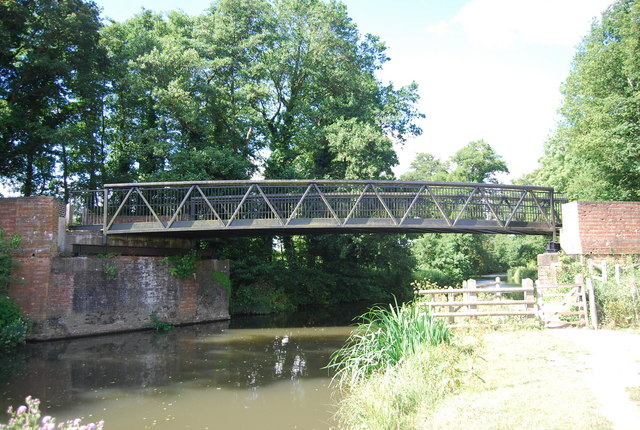
The Downs Link bridge over the River Wey

In the early 21st century, two separate projects allowed the path to be extended over additional sections of the former Cranleigh line. Firstly, the demolished railway bridge over the River Wey was rebuilt in July 2006, allowing easier access to the Downs Link from Guildford town centre. Secondly, the 0.87 mi (1.4 km) section of the trackbed east of Slinfold became part of the route in September 2020. The works, which were funded as a collaborative project between Christ's Hospital school and West Sussex County Council, included the restoration of the Cranleigh line platforms at Christ's Hospital station. (Note: The Downs Link extension from the South Downs Way at St Botolph's to Shoreham-by-Sea opened on 4 October 1993.)

== Locomotives ==
The first locomotive to work on the line was a 2-2-2 tender engine, designed by John Chester Craven and built in 1865 at Brighton works. It was based at Horsham shed until its withdrawal in May 1886. From the mid-1880s, LB&SCR D1 class tank engines, designed by William Stroudley, were introduced on Guildford–Horsham services. Members of this class were named Cranleigh, Rudgwick, Slinfold and Baynards after stations on the line. Two smaller LB&SCR A1 class locomotives, named Bramley and Wonersh, were based at Bramley shed.

An SR V "Schools" class locomotive, designed by Richard Maunsell and constructed in June 1935, was named Cranleigh after Cranleigh School. Although it never ran in passenger service on the line, the locomotive was exhibited at Cranleigh station that October. An earlier SR V class locomotive, which entered passenger service in December 1932, was similarly named Christ's Hospital. (Note: The SR V "Schools" class locomotives Christ's Hospital and Cranleigh were withdrawn from passenger service in January and December 1962 respectively.)

During the inter-war period, the D1 class locomotives were replaced by LSWR M7 class tank engines, designed by Dugald Drummond, working the line until January 1963. SECR H class engines, capable of operating autotrains, were introduced in the early 1950s, but push-pull working was eliminated from the line in mid-1961. That summer, BR Standard Class 2 2-6-2Ts and LMS Ivatt Class 2 2-6-2Ts, which would operate the majority of passenger services up until closure, began working on the line.

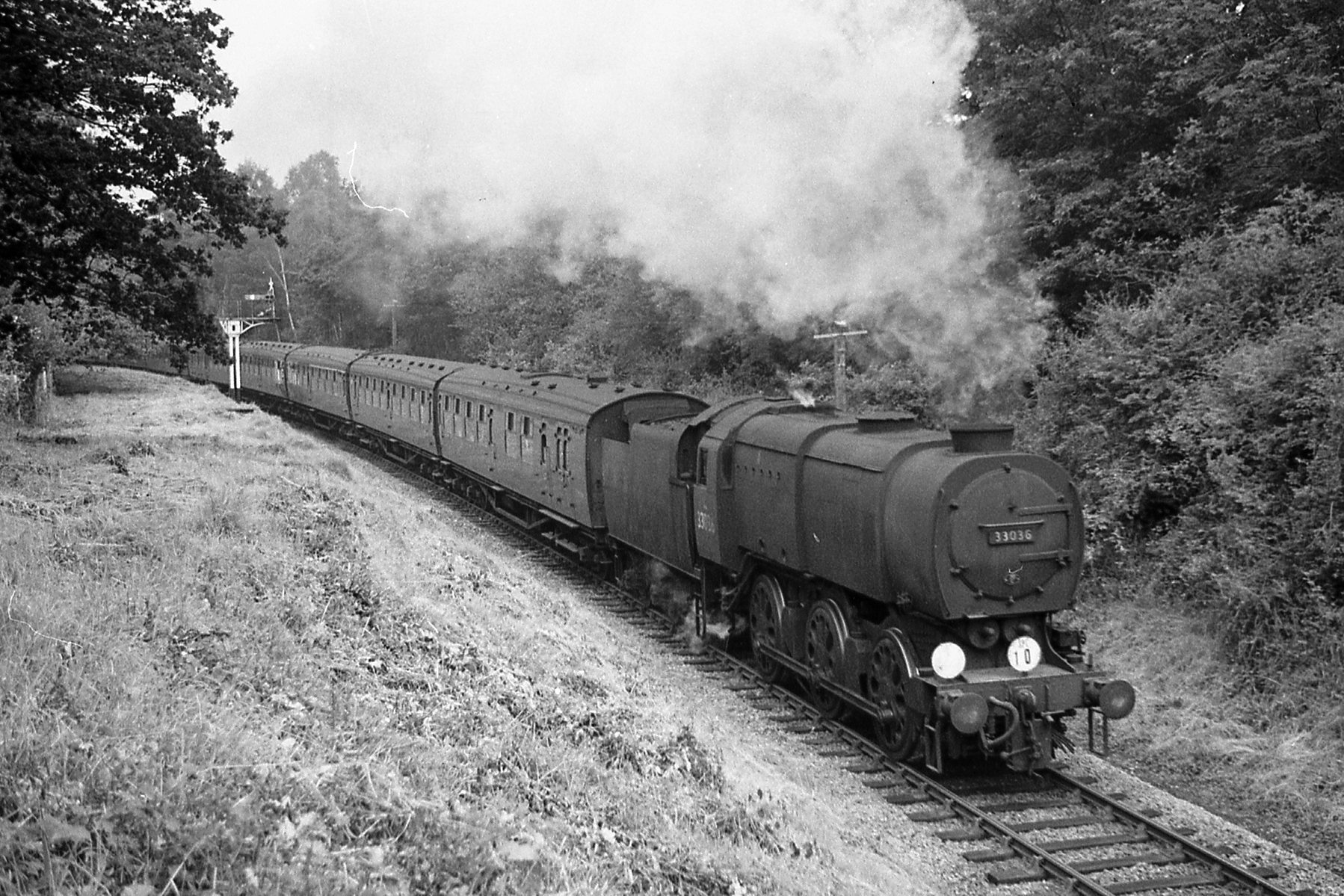
An SR Q1 class locomotive near Baynards station in 1963

Locomotives hauling goods trains in the 1960s included Type 3 diesels and SR Q1 class tender engines, both of which saw occasional use on passenger services. Q1 locomotives, based at Guildford shed, were commonly used on the services from Guildford that terminated at Cranleigh. The final passenger train on the line was an enthusiasts' special. It ran on Sunday 13 June 1965, the day after the last scheduled service, and was hauled by two Q1 class engines. The following day, a locomotive completed a round trip from Horsham to Baynards to collect a train of empty goods wagons from one of the sidings.

== Freight ==
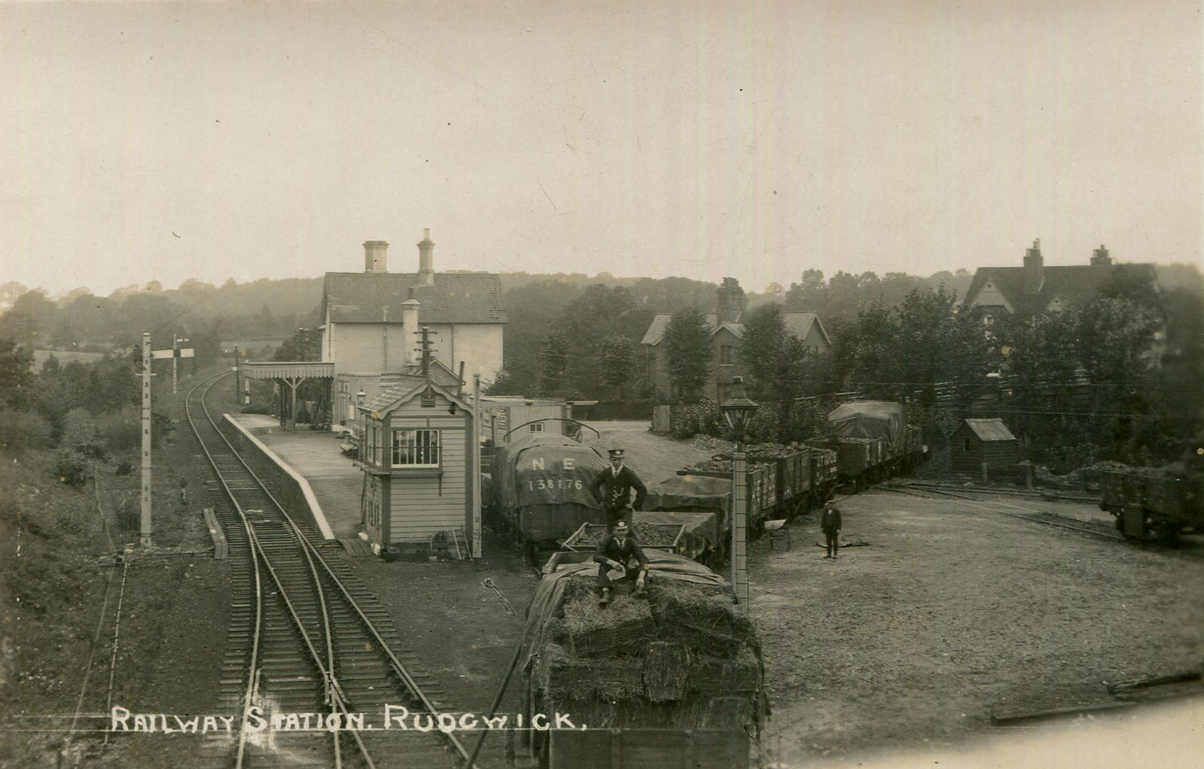
Rudgwick goods yard, to the right of the station platform

Goods facilities had not been constructed by the time the Cranleigh line opened and it was not until 31 October 1865 that the LB&SCR line engineer was instructed to draw up plans for freight depots at the stations. Between 1877 and 1933, coal was delivered by rail to dedicated sidings at Cranleigh gasworks. In the late 19th century, livestock and agricultural products were transported from Baynards station via the line, including sheep from Romney Marsh, which were wintered in the area. There was a private siding for a ladder factory at Slinfold, where there was also a brickworks. The two other brickworks on the line, at Cranleigh and Baynards, were served by narrow-gauge railways. Two sidings were provided at the north end of Bramley station, one of which was used for coal and the other for general public freight. The goods yard at Rudgwick was equipped with a turntable for wagons.

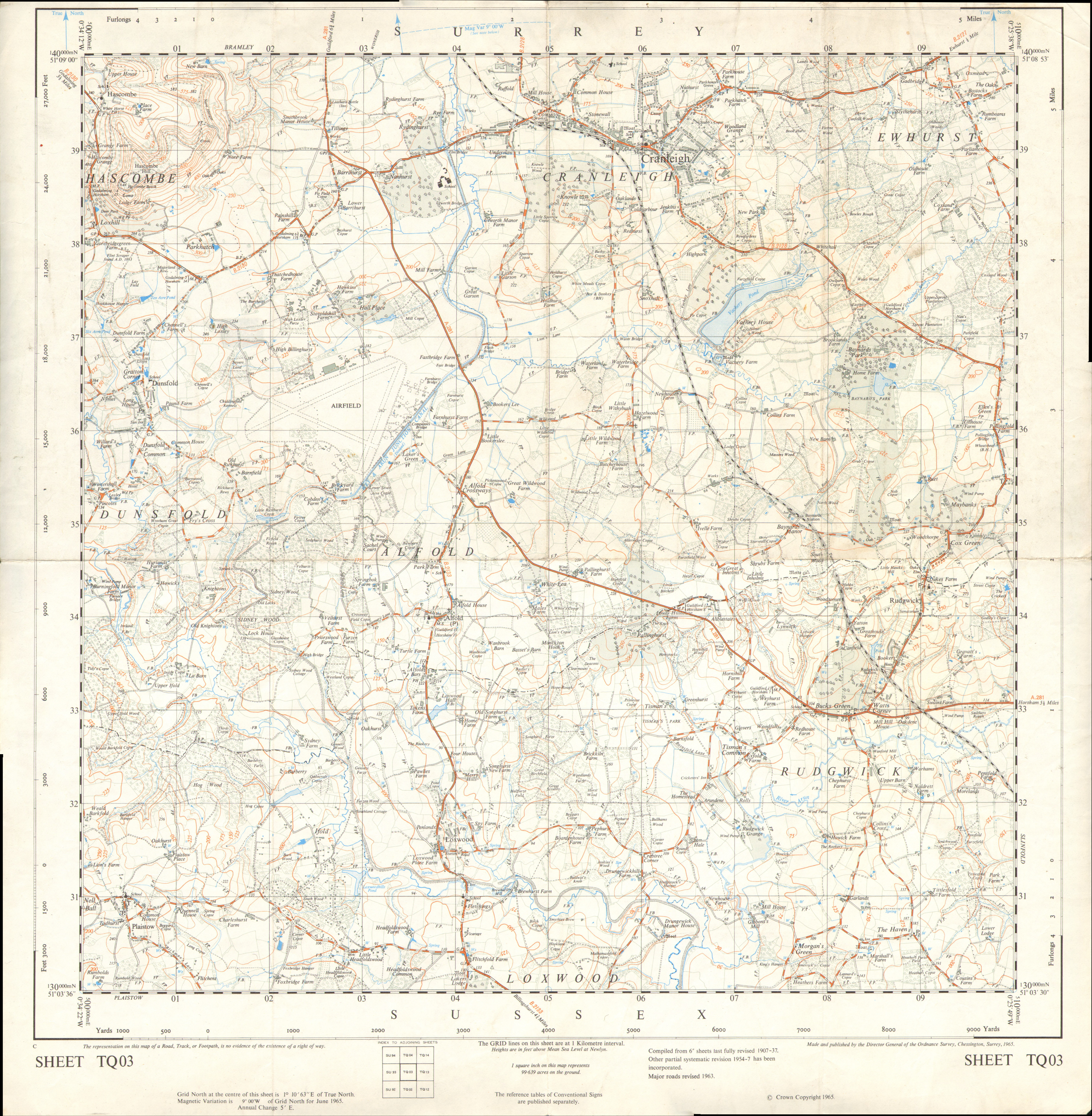
Steetley chemical works (upper left) and Baynards station in 1965

In the early 20th century, a quarry and processing facility for Fuller's earth was established on the site of the former brickworks at Baynards. In 1937, it became the site of the Steetley Chemicals Company and a regular supply of sulphur was delivered by rail to the plant, up until the closure of the line in 1965. An 0-4-0 tank engine, originally used at the brickworks, was used to shunt wagons until 1949, when it was replaced by a four-wheeled Motor Rail diesel locomotive. Chemicals manufacture ceased at Baynards in 1989.

The 1955 rail strike prompted several of the companies that received or sent goods via the line to permanently transfer their operations to road haulage. The line was closed to public freight on 10 October 1962.

== Accidents and incidents ==
- 27 August 1863: A surveyor was killed in Baynards Tunnel, while the line was under construction.
- 21 September 1866: Four passengers were injured when a passenger service from Guildford collided with a goods train that was entering a siding at Bramley.
- 16 December 1942: Eight people were killed when an enemy aircraft attacked a passenger train near Bramley & Wonersh station. The Dornier Do 217 dropped two bombs on the line and strafed the carriages with machine gun fire.
- 2 December 1961: A train crashed into a buffer stop shortly after departing from Bramley & Wonersh station. It had been misrouted into a headshunt, after a signaller had incorrectly set the points. Only nine passengers were on board the train at the time.

== Bibliography ==
- Beeching, Richard (27 March 1963a). The Reshaping of British Railways Part 1: Report. London: HMSO.
- Beeching, Richard (27 March 1963b). The Reshaping of British Railways Part 2: Maps. London: HMSO.
- Buckman, James (2002). The Steyning Line. Seaford: SB Publications. ISBN 978-1-85-770254-5.
- Grayer, Jeffery (2024). Horsham – Christ's Hospital – Cranleigh – Guildford. From the Adur to the Wey. Vol. 2. Totem Publishing. ISBN 978-1-91-389349-1.
- Hodd, H.R. (1975). The Horsham–Guildford Direct Railway. Locomotion Papers. Vol. 87. Tarrant Hinton: The Oakwood Press. ISBN 978-0-85-361170-7.
- Howard, Rosie; Legate, Pam (2001). Bloomfield, Peter (ed.). Christ's Hospital in the Year 2000. Horsham: Christ's Hospital. ISBN 978-0-95-078434-2.
- Jackson, Alan A. (1999). The Railway in Surrey. Penryn: Atlantic Transport Publishers. ISBN 978-0-90-689990-8.
- Miller, Michael (2005) [1995]. Around Cranleigh. Stroud: Nonsuch Publishing. ISBN 978-1-84-588143-6.
- Mitchell, Vic; Smith, Keith (1984) [1982]. Branch Lines to Horsham. Midhurst: Middleton Press. ISBN 978-0-90-652002-4.
- Morley, David, ed. (1994). Bramley Centenary Guide. Bramley: Bramley Parish Council. ISBN 978-0-95-244980-5.
- Oppitz, Leslie (1987). Sussex Railways Remembered. Newbury: Countryside Books. ISBN 978-0-90-539299-8.
- Oppitz, Leslie (1988). Surrey Railways Remembered. Newbury: Countryside Books. ISBN 978-1-85-306005-2.
- Quick, Michael (2023) [2001]. Railway Passenger Stations in Great Britain (PDF) (5.05 ed.). London: Railway and Canal Historical Society.
- Seymour, B.; Warrington, M. (1984). Bygone Cranleigh. Chichester: Phillimore. ISBN 978-0-85-033549-1.
- Swift, Peter (2006). Maunsell Schools Class 4-4-0. Locomotives in Detail. Hersham: Ian Allan. ISBN 978-0-71-103178-4.
- Turner, J.T. Howard (1978). The London, Brighton & South Coast Railway. Vol. 2 : Establishment and Growth. London: B.T. Batsford. ISBN 978-0-71-341198-0.
- Turner, J.T. Howard (1979). The London, Brighton & South Coast Railway. Vol. 3 : Completion and Maturity. London: B.T. Batsford. ISBN 978-0-71-341389-2.
- Welch, Michael (1998). Sussex Steam. Harrow Weald: Capital Transport. ISBN 978-1-85-414202-3.
- Welch, Michael (2001). Surrey Steam. Harrow Weald: Capital Transport. ISBN 978-1-85-414238-2.
- Welch, Michael (2006). Southern Branch Lines. Harrow Weald: Capital Transport. ISBN 978-1-85-414306-8.
- Welch, Michael (2007). Decline of Southern Steam. Harrow Weald: Capital Transport. ISBN 978-1-85-414313-6.
- Vine, P.A.L. (1996). London's Lost Route to the Sea: An Historical Account of the Inland Navigations which Linked the Thames to the English Channel (5th ed.). Midhurst: Middleton Press. ISBN 978-1-87-379378-7.
- Vine, P.A.L. (1999). The Wey & Arun Junction Canal. Images of England. Stroud: Tempus. ISBN 978-0-75-241721-9.
- Williams, R. A. (1968). The London & South Western Railway. Vol. 1: The Formative Years. Newton Abbot: David & Charles. ISBN 978-0-71-534188-9.
- Williams, R. A. (1973). The London & South Western Railway. Vol. 2: Growth and Consolidation. Newton Abbot: David & Charles. ISBN 978-0-71-535940-2.
- "Kent / Sussex / Wessex Routes Sectional Appendix" (PDF). Network Rail. 2009.
