= Bramley railway station =

Bramley railway station may refer to:

- Bramley railway station (Hampshire), in Bramley, Hampshire, England
- Bramley railway station (West Yorkshire), in Leeds, England
- Bramley & Wonersh railway station, disused station in Surrey
