= Baynards railway station =

Former railway station in Baynards Park, Surrey

Coordinates: 51.10509°N 0.46305°W

Baynards
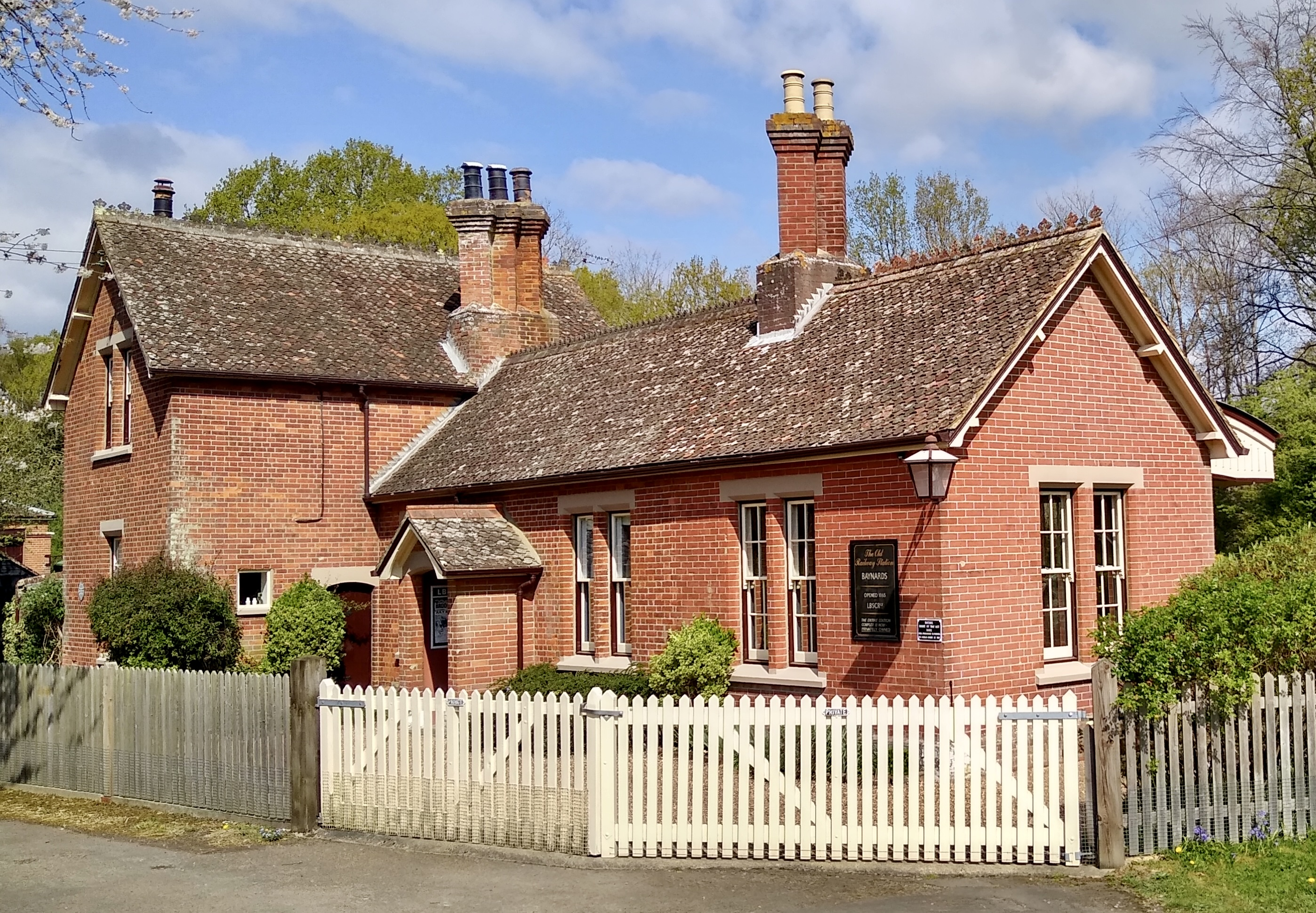
- Station building, 2025

General information
- Location: Baynards Park, Waverley, Surrey; England
- Grid reference: TQ077351
- Platforms: 2

Other information
- Status: Disused

History
- Pre-grouping: London, Brighton and South Coast Railway
- Post-grouping: Southern Railway; Southern Region of British Railways

Key dates
- 2 October 1865: Station opened
- 14 June 1965: Station closed
Location

Baynards is a former railway station on the Cranleigh line, between Guildford, Surrey and Horsham, West Sussex, England. The station opened with the line on 2 October 1865 and had two platforms and a signal box, which controlled the level crossing immediately to the south. Freight trains served the nearby brickworks and there was a public goods shed at the station.

In the mid-20th century, the station was used as a filming location, appearing in several productions, including the 1942 comedy, The Black Sheep of Whitehall and the 1957 BBC television series, The Railway Children. Baynards was listed for closure in the 1963 Beeching report and passenger services were withdrawn from 14 June 1965.

Baynards station comprises the stationmaster's house, two waiting rooms, covered platforms, storage sheds, a booking hall, a porch and a large goods shed. It was sold for conversion into a private residence in 1973. A project to restore the station was recognised by an award from the Surrey Industrial History Group in 1985.

== Description and location ==
Baynards station is a former railway station in Surrey, England. By the time of its closure on 14 June 1965, it was one of six passenger stations on the Cranleigh line. By rail it was 8 mi 27 ch (13.4 km) from Horsham station, the southern terminus for most services on the route, and 9 mi 63 ch (15.8 km) from Peasmarsh Junction, where trains could join the Portsmouth Direct line to access Guildford station. When it opened on 2 October 1865, Baynards was the only place on the single-track line with a passing loop for passenger trains. To the north of the station, the line passed through the grounds of Baynards Park, to the south, it ran through the 381 yd-long (348 m) Baynards Tunnel, where it crossed the county boundary between Surrey and West Sussex.

The 17-lever signal box was at the south end of the station. At the time of the line's closure, the section to the north was controlled using electric tokens, but to the south, the line was worked using the staff and ticket system. The adjacent level crossing gates were initially operated from the box using a hand-cranked lever, later replaced by a gate wheel, which was in turn removed in the mid-1950s. The goods facilities at Baynards included a shed, equipped with a 1 long ton (1.0 t) crane, and a private long-siding for a Fuller's earth manufacturer, which became the site of Steetley chemical works in 1937. In the 1890s, the station also functioned as the local post office.

== History ==
Baynards station was built for Lord Thurlow, the owner of nearby Baynards Park, whose land was on the route of the proposed railway line. As a condition of sale, Lord Thurlow insisted on having a station built to serve his estate, despite there being no large settlement nearby. The line was built as a single track, but since Baynards was approximately midway between Guildford and Horsham, the station was constructed with two platforms and a signal box to enable trains to pass. The opening of the line, on Monday 2 October 1865, was marked by a celebration at the station. The arrival of the first train was serenaded by a band and the directors of the London, Brighton and South Coast Railway attended a lunch at Baynards Park.

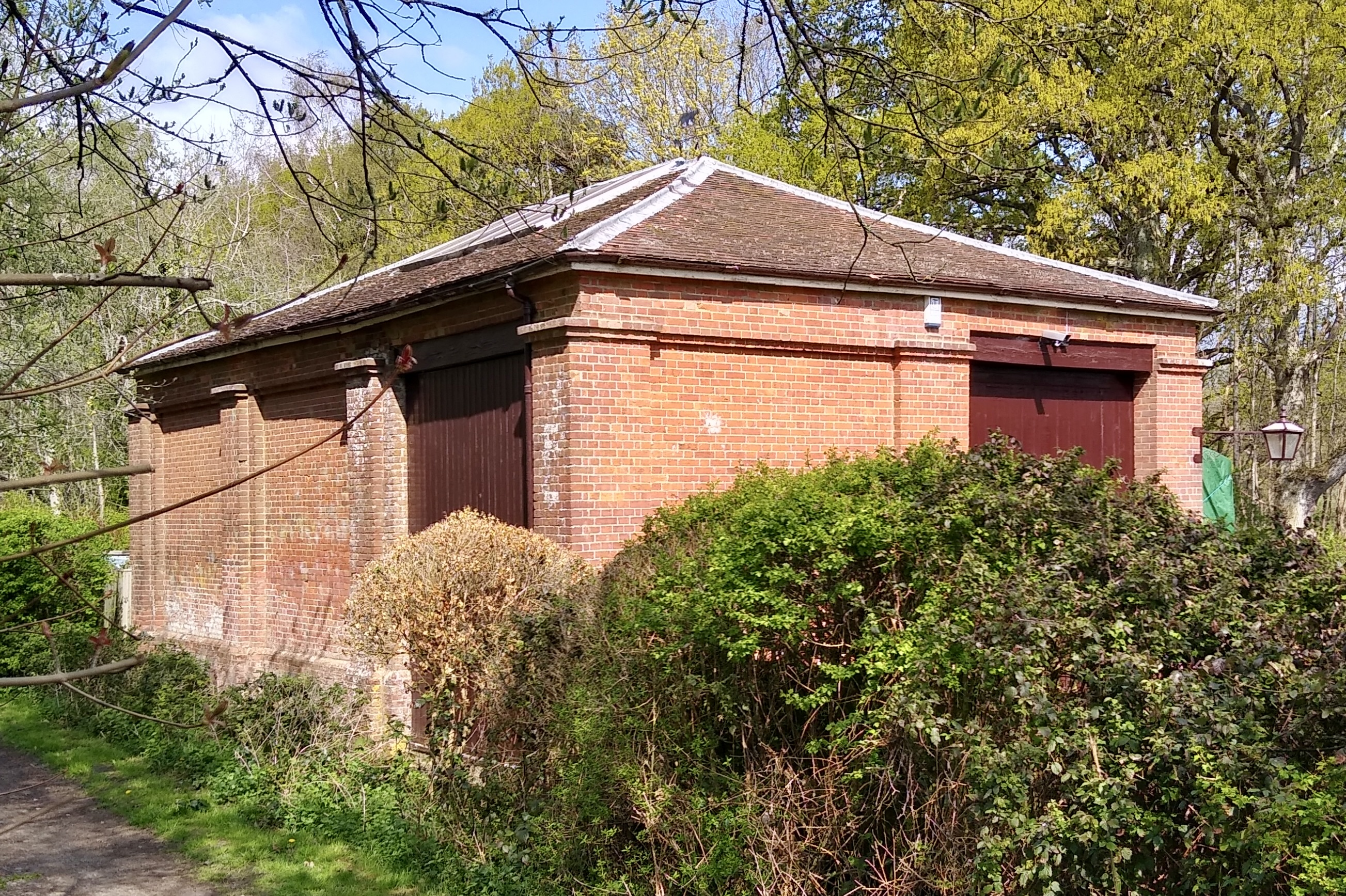
The former Baynards goods shed

Near the station was the Baynards Brick and Tile Works, which was served by its own private siding. In early years it was a brickworks, producing Fuller's earth for the wool industry, and then foundry clay in later years. It then became a chemical processing works, receiving annually 400 tons of goods by rail (including sulphur). The 1955 rail strike prompted several of the companies that received or sent goods via the Cranleigh line to transfer their operations to road haulage, and Baynards goods yard closed in September 1963.

During the Second World War, there was a camp for American troops at Baynards Park. The station was heavily used to supply the training facilities with armoured vehicles and ammunition. In the mid-20th century, Geoff Birdfield, the signalman, cultivated 240 varieties of Dahlia, amounting to around 1000 plants in total, on the station platforms.

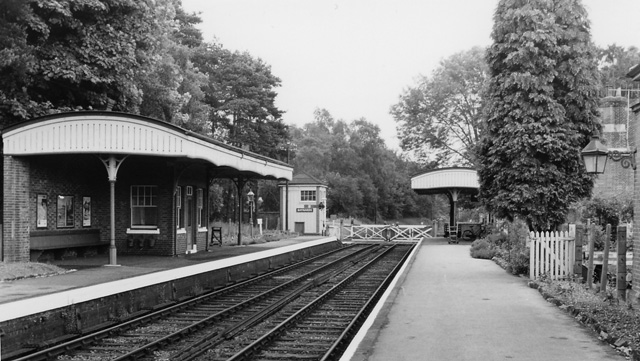
Baynards railway station in 1961

Like other stations on the Cranleigh line, Baynards was listed for closure in the first Beeching report, published in 1963. The final day of operation of scheduled public services was Saturday 12 June 1965. An enthusiasts' special, which ran the full length of the route on Sunday 13 June 1965, was the final passenger train to operate on the Cranleigh line. The following day, a locomotive completed a round trip from Horsham to Baynards to collect a set of empty goods wagons from one of the sidings.

In June 1973, the station was sold for conversion into a private residence, to fund the construction of a bridleway along the course of the old railway. The works to create the path included sealing the entrance to Baynards Tunnel with concrete blocks and filling the cutting on the northern approach with inert waste to create a ramped access to Cox Green Road. The bridleway was officially opened as the Downs Link at a ceremony at Baynards on 9 July 1984.

The goods shed was not included in the initial sale in 1973, but it was acquired by the owners of the station in 1984. The project to restore Baynards station was recognised by an award given by the Surrey Industrial History Group in 1985.

== In popular culture ==
In the 1940s and 1950s, Baynards was used as a location for films and television. The station appeared in the 1942 comedy, The Black Sheep of Whitehall, and the 1945 melodrama, They Were Sisters. Extensive use of the station was made by the 1957 BBC television series, The Railway Children, based on the novel of the same name by E. Nesbit. Several sequences used an LSWR T9 class locomotive, which did not otherwise run on the line. Later filming at Baynards station included scenes for The Horsemasters (1961), (Note: Baynards station appears as "Valleywood" in the 1961 Disneyland TV show, The Horsemasters.) The Grass is Greener (1960), and Die, Monster, Die! (1965).

Preceding station	Disused railways	Following station
Cranleigh; Line and station closed	London, Brighton and South Coast Railway; Horsham and Guildford Direct Railway	Rudgwick; Line and station closed

== Sources ==
- Beeching, Richard (27 March 1963). The Reshaping of British Railways Part 1: Report. London: HMSO.
- Grayer, Jefferey (2024). Horsham – Christ's Hospital – Cranleigh – Guildford. From the Adur to the Wey. Vol. 2. Totem Publishing. ISBN 978-1-91-389349-1.
- Hodd, H.R. (1975). The Horsham–Guildford Direct Railway. Locomotion Papers. Vol. 87. Tarrant Hinton: The Oakwood Press. ISBN 978-0-85-361170-7.
- Jackson, Alan A. (1999). The Railway in Surrey. Penryn: Atlantic Transport Publishers. ISBN 978-0-90-689990-8.
- Mitchell, Vic; Smith, Keith (1984) [1982]. Branch Lines to Horsham. Midhurst: Middleton Press. ISBN 978-0-90-652002-4.
- Oppitz, Leslie (1988). Surrey Railways Remembered. Newbury: Countryside Books. ISBN 978-1-85-306005-2.
- Turner, J.T. Howard (1978). The London, Brighton & South Coast Railway. Vol. 2 : Establishment and growth. London: B.T. Batsford. ISBN 978-0-71-341198-0.
- Welch, Michael (2001). Surrey Steam. Harrow Weald: Capital Transport. ISBN 978-1-85-414238-2.
- Welch, Michael (2006). Southern Branch Lines. Harrow Weald: Capital Transport. ISBN 978-1-85-414306-8.
- Welch, Michael (2007). Decline of Southern Steam. Harrow Weald: Capital Transport. ISBN 978-1-85-414313-6.
- Kelly's Post Office London Directory. London: Kelly’s Directories. 1891.
- Post Office Guide. London: Wyman & Sons. 1 October 1896.
