= Selham railway station =

Former railway station in England

Coordinates: 50.9766°N 0.6719°W

Selham
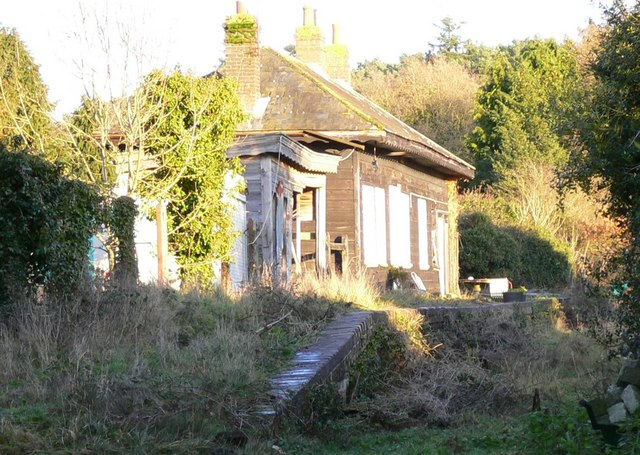
- Station building in 2008

General information
- Location: Selham, Chichester, West Sussex; England
- Grid reference: SU934205
- Platforms: 1

Other information
- Status: Disused

History
- Pre-grouping: London, Brighton and South Coast Railway
- Post-grouping: Southern Railway; Southern Region of British Railways

Key dates
- 1866: Line opened
- 1 July 1872: Station opened
- 7 February 1955: Station closed (passengers)
- May 1963: Station closed (freight)
- 1964: Line closed
Location

Selham railway station served the village of Selham in the county of West Sussex in England. The station was out in mostly open fields, although a public house was located nearby. The station was on the Pulborough to Midhurst line which was originally part of the London Brighton and South Coast Railway. The station opened after the line (which opened in 1866) on 1 July 1872. The station was closed to passenger services in 1955, but freight was still carried up to May 1963, before the station was closed completely. The line through the station remained open for another year serving Midhurst. The station building is now a private home.

| Preceding station | Disused railways | Following station |
|---|---|---|
| Petworth | Midhurst Railways | Midhurst |
