= Cranleigh railway station =

Former railway station in England

Coordinates: 51.1412°N 0.4922°W

Cranleigh
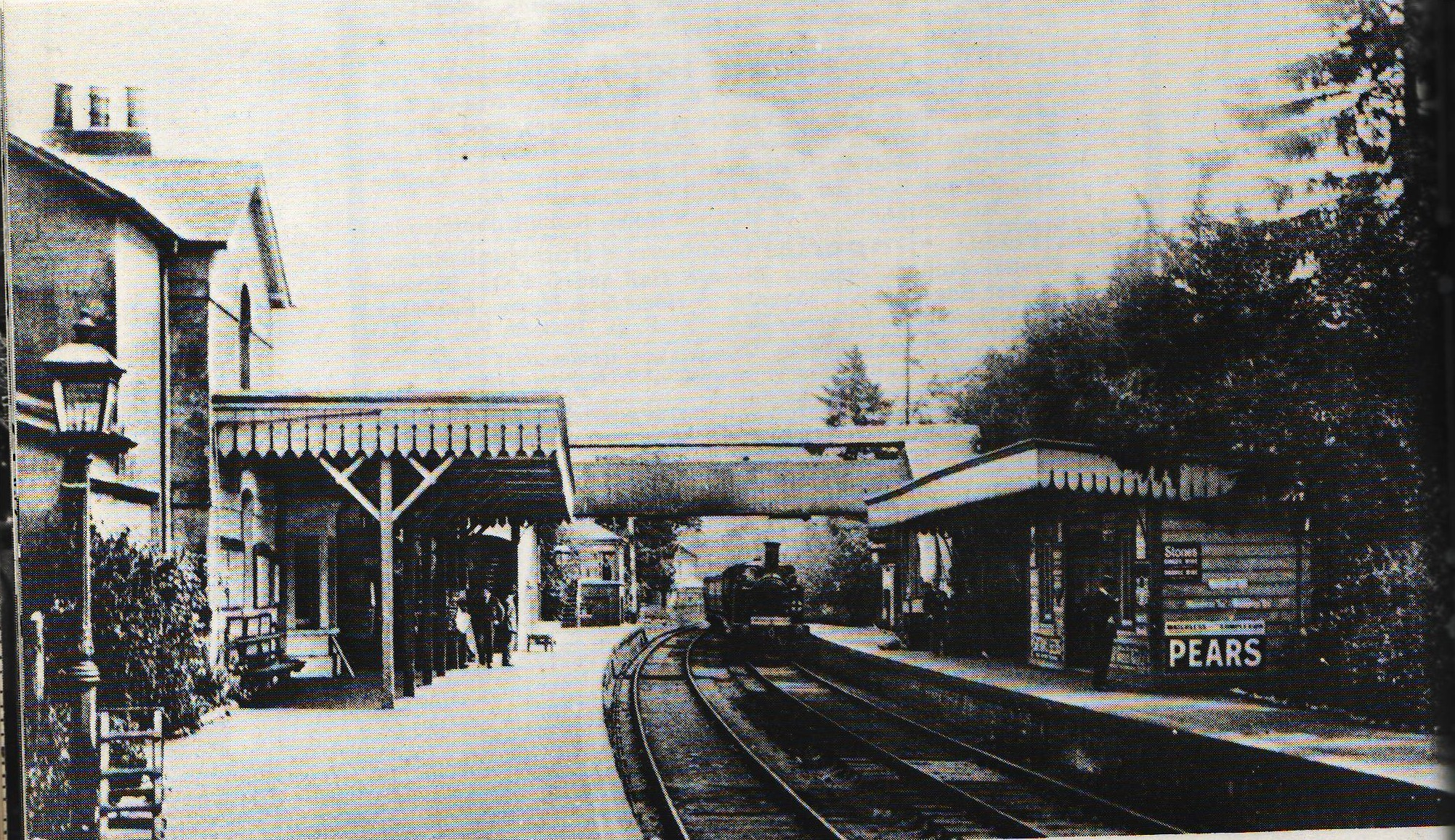

General information
- Location: Cranleigh, Waverley, Surrey; England
- Grid reference: TQ056391
- Platforms: 2 (originally 1)

Other information
- Status: Disused

History
- Pre-grouping: London, Brighton and South Coast Railway
- Post-grouping: Southern Railway; Southern Region of British Railways

Key dates
- 2 October 1865: Opened as "Cranley"
- 1867: Renamed "Cranleigh"
- 14 June 1965: Closed
Location

Cranleigh was a railway station on the Cranleigh Line between Guildford and Horsham. It served the village of Cranleigh, Surrey in South East England and opened on 2 October 1865. It was listed for closure in the first Beeching Report, published in 1963, and public services were withdrawn on 14 June 1965. The station and the goods yard were demolished, and are now the site of the Stocklund Square shopping centre.

== Description and location ==
Cranleigh station was a railway station in Surrey, England. Originally called "Cranley", the name was changed with that of the village to its current spelling in 1867, to avoid confusion with Crawley in West Sussex. By the time of its closure on 14 June 1965, it was one of six passenger stations on the Cranleigh line. By rail it was 11 mi 19 ch (18.1 km) from Horsham station, the southern terminus for most services on the route, and 6 mi 71 ch (11.1 km) from Peasmarsh Junction, where trains could join the Portsmouth Direct line to access Guildford station. When it opened on 2 October 1865, Cranleigh had only one platform, but a second was added with a passing loop in 1880.

The 18-lever signal box was originally at the Horsham end of the northernmost platform, but was later moved to the Guildford end of the same platform. There was also a gate box at the Knowle Lane level crossing at the east end of the station. The freight facilities at Cranleigh included a public goods yard and a siding to the gasworks, to which coal was delivered by rail between 1877 and 1933.

== History ==
The line through Cranleigh was proposed by the Horsham and Guildford Direct Railway and was authorised by Parliament in August 1860. The company was taken over by the London, Brighton and South Coast Railway (LB&SCR) on 29 June 1865. Cranleigh station opened with the line on 2 October 1865, and all passenger trains were operated by the LB&SCR from the outset.

Two schemes for new railways serving Cranleigh were put forward at the end of the 19th century. Under the provisions of the Light Railways Act 1896, a line linking Ockley and Selham (near Midhurst) was proposed, but failed to attract support. Between 1897 and 1899, various routes for a branch from the Dorking and Holmwood areas to Cranleigh were suggested, but the railways were opposed by local residents, who feared that the LB&SCR was using the new schemes to block competition from the rival London and South Western Railway.

An SR V "Schools" class locomotive, designed by Richard Maunsell and constructed in June 1935, was named Cranleigh after Cranleigh School. Although it never ran in passenger service on the line, the locomotive was exhibited at Cranleigh station that October. Cranleigh was withdrawn from passenger service in December 1962.

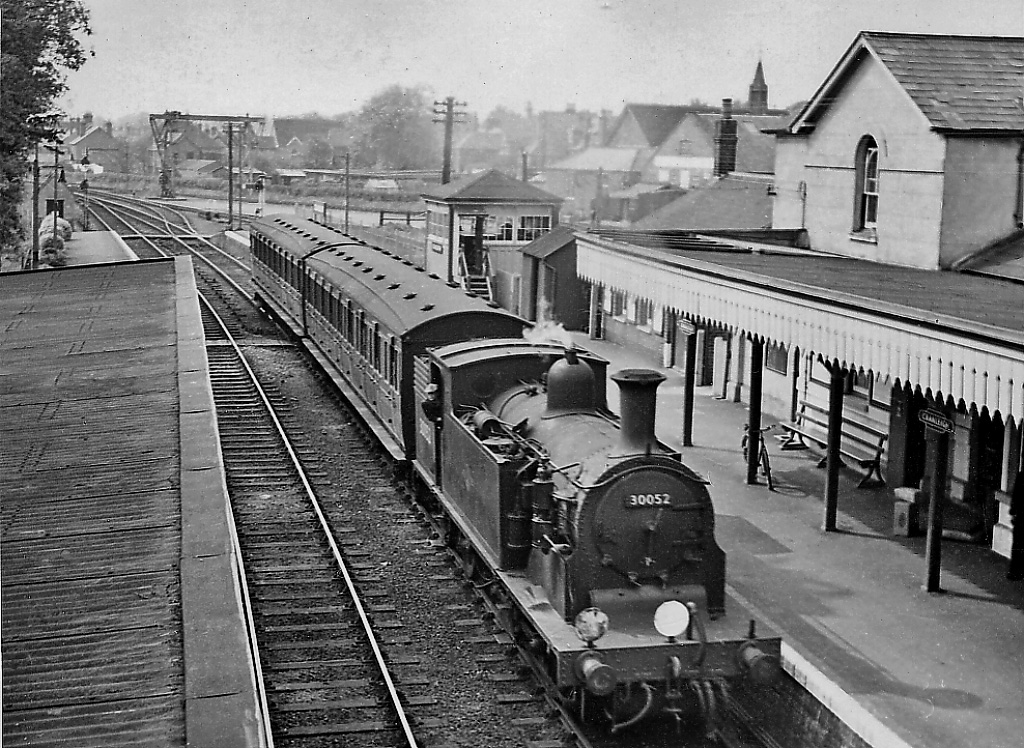
Cranleigh station in 1957, looking towards Guildford

Like the other stations on the Cranleigh line, Cranleigh was listed for closure in the first Beeching report, published in 1963. The final day of operation of scheduled public services was Saturday 12 June 1965. An enthusiasts' special, which ran the full length of the route on Sunday 13 June 1965, was the final passenger train to operate on the Cranleigh line.

In April 1966, the track was lifted from the line and, in the same month, permission was given for the station and goods yard at Cranleigh to be used for the Stocklund Square shopping centre and its associated car park. A Sainsbury's supermarket was added to the development in 2004. Cranleigh station footbridge survived and in April 1967 it was re-erected at Liss railway station on the Portsmouth Direct Line.

In July 1984, the Downs Link was opened along the route of the old railway, as a continuous bridlepath from the North Downs Way at St Martha's Hill to the South Downs Way at St Botolph's, near Shoreham-by-Sea. Since the station site at Cranleigh had been developed, Waverley Borough Council wanted the new path to bypass Stocklund Square to the south, but the Bonham Trust initially refused permission to create a new bridleway through Snoxhall Fields, which it owned. The Downs Link was therefore initially routed via the High Street, until the council and trust had concluded a Path Creation Order Agreement in December 1985, allowing the path to run close to the former railway alignment to the south of the village centre.

== Future ==
Studies of the feasibility of reopening the Guildford – Bramley – Cranleigh section of the line were completed in 1994, 1997 and 2009. The 1994 report concluded that the investment required would not justify reinstatement, but Waverley Borough Council has protected the line from development in its Local Plan. The 2009 report estimates that reopening the Guildford – Bramley – Cranleigh section would have a positive benefit-cost ratio of 1.7 to 1 including capital costs.

| Preceding station | Disused railways | Following station |
|---|---|---|
| Bramley & Wonersh; Line and station closed | London, Brighton and South Coast Railway; Horsham and Guildford Direct Railway | Baynards; Line and station closed |

== See also ==
- List of closed railway stations in Britain

== Sources ==
- Beeching, Richard (27 March 1963). The Reshaping of British Railways Part 1: Report. London: HMSO.
- Budgen, Christopher (2008). Cranleigh: A History. Chichester: Phillimore. ISBN 978-1-86-077503-1.
- Grayer, Jefferey (2024). Horsham – Christ's Hospital – Cranleigh – Guildford. From the Adur to the Wey. Vol. 2. Totem Publishing. ISBN 978-1-91-389349-1.
- Hodd, H.R. (1975). The Horsham–Guildford Direct Railway. Locomotion Papers. Vol. 87. Tarrant Hinton: The Oakwood Press. ISBN 978-0-85-361170-7.
- Jackson, Alan A. (1999). The Railway in Surrey. Penryn: Atlantic Transport Publishers. ISBN 978-0-90-689990-8.
- Miller, Michael (2005) [1995]. Around Cranleigh. Stroud: Nonsuch Publishing. ISBN 978-1-84-588143-6.
- Mitchell, Vic; Smith, Keith (1984) [1982]. Branch Lines to Horsham. Midhurst: Middleton Press. ISBN 978-0-90-652002-4.
- Oppitz, Leslie (1988). Surrey Railways Remembered. Newbury: Countryside Books. ISBN 978-1-85-306005-2.
- Seymour, B.; Warrington, M. (1984). Bygone Cranleigh. Chichester: Phillimore. ISBN 978-0-85-033549-1.
- Swift, Peter (2006). Maunsell Schools Class 4-4-0. Locomotives in Detail. Hersham: Ian Allan. ISBN 978-0-71-103178-4.
- Turner, J.T. Howard (1978). The London, Brighton & South Coast Railway. Vol. 2 : Establishment and growth. London: B.T. Batsford. ISBN 978-0-71-341198-0.
- Turner, J.T. Howard (1979). The London, Brighton & South Coast Railway. Vol. 3 : Completion and Maturity. London: B.T. Batsford. ISBN 978-0-71-341389-2.
- Welch, Michael (2001). Surrey Steam. Harrow Weald: Capital Transport. ISBN 978-1-85-414238-2.
- Welch, Michael (2006). Southern Branch Lines. Harrow Weald: Capital Transport. ISBN 978-1-85-414306-8.
- Welch, Michael (2007). Decline of Southern Steam. Harrow Weald: Capital Transport. ISBN 978-1-85-414313-6.
- Winkworth, D. W. (1982). The Schools 4-4-0s. Hemel Hempstead: George Allen & Unwin. ISBN 978-0-04-385095-4.
