= Bramley & Wonersh railway station =

Disused railway station in England

Coordinates: 51.19620°N 0.55592°W

Bramley & Wonersh
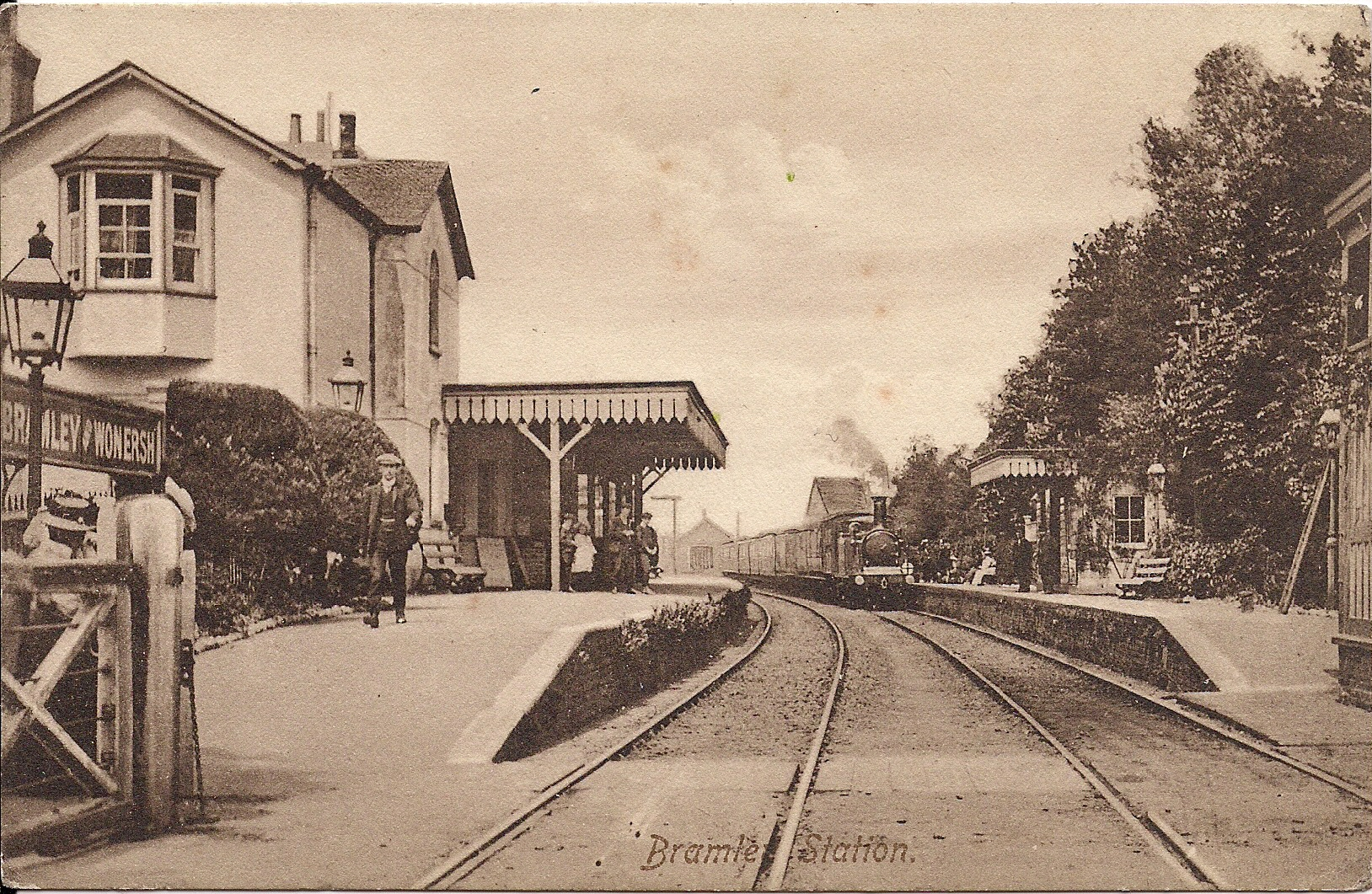

General information
- Location: Bramley, Waverley, Surrey; England
- Grid reference: TQ010451
- Platforms: 2 (originally 1)

Other information
- Status: Disused

History
- Original company: London, Brighton and South Coast Railway
- Post-grouping: Southern Railway; Southern Region of British Railways

Key dates
- 2 October 1865: Opened as "Bramley"
- 1 June 1888: Renamed "Bramley & Wonersh"
- 14 June 1965: Closed
Location

Bramley & Wonersh is a former railway station on the Cranleigh Line between Guildford and Horsham. It served the villages of Bramley and Wonersh in Surrey, South East England and opened on 2 October 1865. It was listed for closure in the first Beeching Report, published in 1963, and public services were withdrawn on 14 June 1965.

== Description and location ==
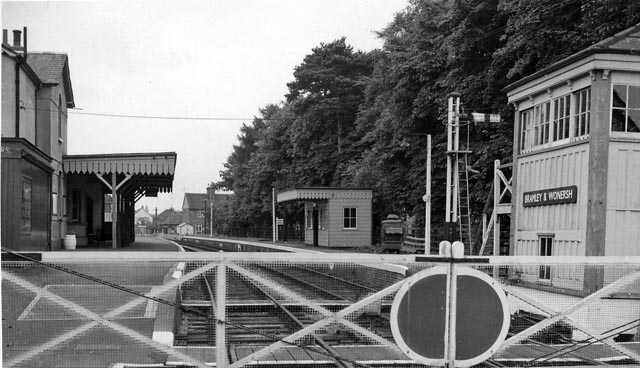
Bramley & Wonersh station in 1961, with the signal box on the right

Bramley & Wonersh station is a former railway station in Surrey, England. By the time of its closure on 14 June 1965, it was one of six passenger stations on the Cranleigh line. By rail it was 16 mi 15 ch (26.1 km) from Horsham station, the southern terminus for most services on the route, and 1 mi 67 ch (3.0 km) from Peasmarsh Junction, where trains could join the Portsmouth Direct line to access Guildford station. When it opened on 2 October 1865, Bramley & Wonersh had only one platform, but a second was added with a passing loop in 1876.

The signal box stood at the southern end of the eastern platform and contained a gate wheel for controlling the adjacent level crossing. The exit from the platform was via a passageway beneath the box. The main building was on the western side of the station, along with a WHSmith kiosk. St Catherine's School, Bramley, adjacent to the station, was opened in 1885.

The goods yard, at the Guildford end of the station, had a water tower and two sidings, one for coal and the other for public goods. Streets siding, a private siding to the south of the station, was built to serve Birtley House. A goods shed was built at the end of the siding in around 1922, which was used by the highways department of Surrey County Council until the Second World War.

== History ==
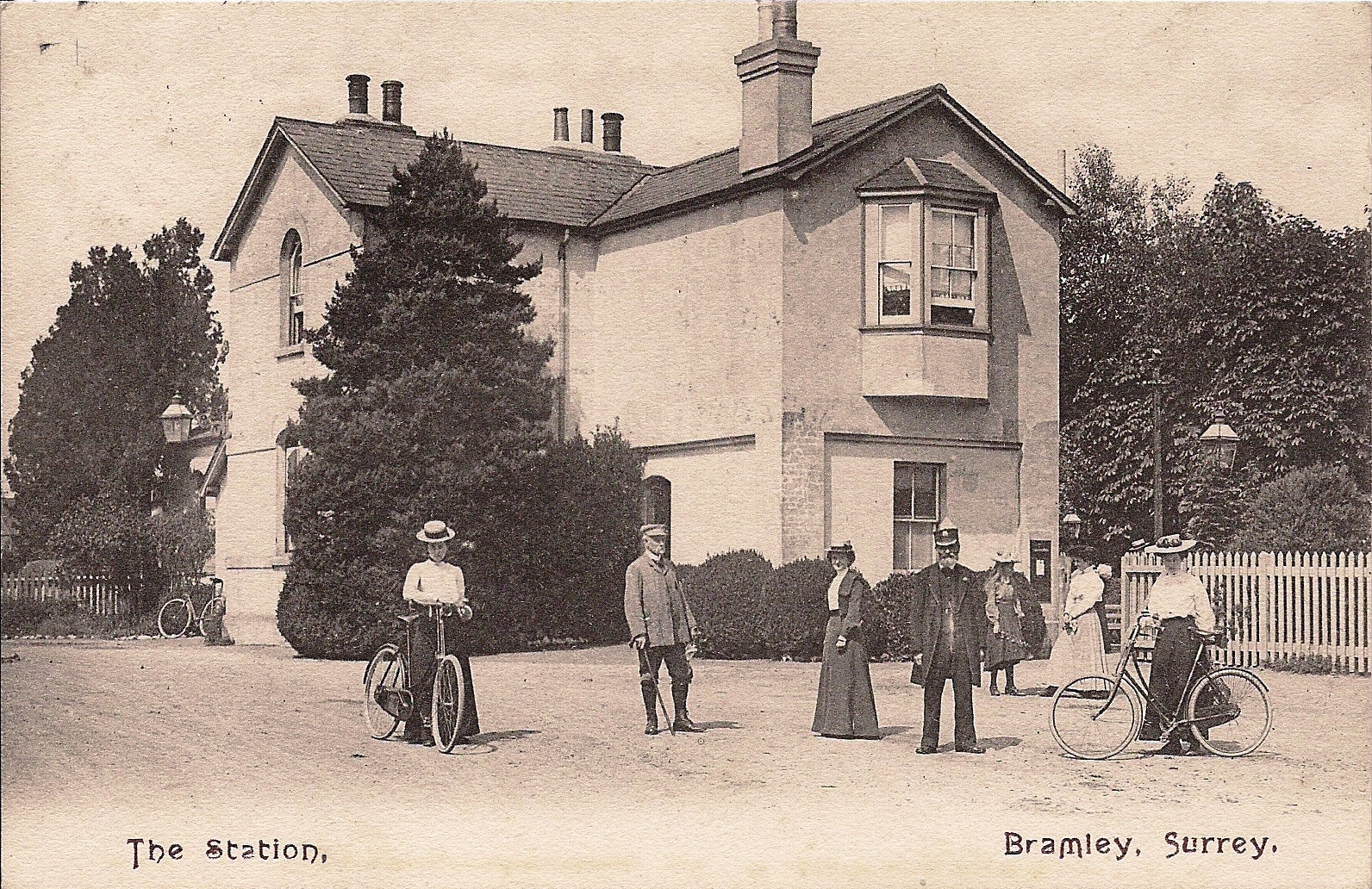
Bramley & Wonersh station building c. 1907

The line through Bramley & Wonersh was proposed by the Horsham and Guildford Direct Railway and was authorised by Parliament in August 1860. The company was taken over by the London, Brighton and South Coast Railway (LB&SCR) on 29 June 1865. Cranleigh station opened with the line on 2 October 1865, and all passenger trains were operated by the LB&SCR from the outset. Two LB&SCR A1 class locomotives, named Bramley and Wonersh, were based at Bramley shed. The shed was demolished by a storm in 1882 and thereafter the engines were housed at Guildford.

Like the other stations on the Cranleigh line, Bramley & Wonersh was listed for closure in the first Beeching report, published in 1963. The final day of operation of scheduled public services was Saturday 12 June 1965. An enthusiasts' special, which ran the full length of the route on Sunday 13 June 1965, was the final passenger train to operate on the Cranleigh line. The track was lifted in April 1966 and the main station building was demolished.

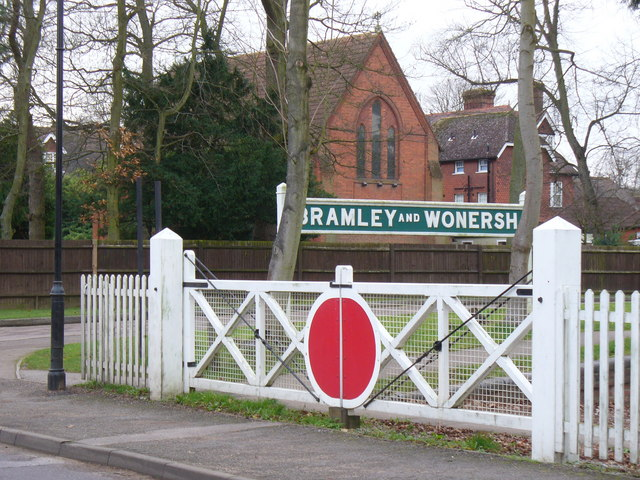
The replica level crossing gates installed in the early 2000s

The trackbed through the station was relaid as a bridleway, and became part of the Downs Link, opened in 1984. the platforms were restored and replica level crossing gates were installed in a two-year project, completed in 2005. Since then, the station site has been part of the Bramley Conservation Area.

== Accidents and incidents ==
On 21 September 1866, four passengers were injured when a service from Guildford collided with a goods train that was entering a siding. Although the signals, which had been set to allow the passenger service to enter the station, were reset to danger when the possibility of a collision was realised, the driver was unable to stop in time and the two trains collided.

On 16 December 1942, an enemy aircraft attacked a passenger train carrying Christmas shoppers home from Guildford near the station. The Dornier Do 217 dropped two bombs on the line and strafed the carriages with machine gun fire. Seven people were killed, including the driver and guard, and one passenger later died of their injuries. The wounded and dying were assisted by a medical unit of the Canadian Army, who were billetted nearby. The wreckage was removed and the damage to the track was repaired, with services able to resume the following day. The Fireman, William Fairey, and station porter, Violet Wisdom, were presented with certificates of merit for their actions in assisting the injured, and Miss Wisdom was commended for her "great courage and resource directly the bombs had fallen".

On 2 December 1961, a passenger train crashed shortly after departing from Bramley & Wonersh. It had waited in the station to allow a late-running service from Guildford to pass. The electric train staff was not working and, in the confusion, the signaller forgot to set the points after the southbound train had arrived. The northbound train departed, but instead of turning onto the running line towards Peasmarsh Junction, it was routed into a headshunt, where it crashed into the buffer stop. Only nine passengers were on board the train at the time, none of whom were seriously injured.

== Future ==
Studies of the feasibility of reopening the Guildford – Bramley – Cranleigh section of the line were completed in 1994, 1997 and 2009. The 1994 report concluded that the investment required would not justify reinstatement, but Waverley Borough Council has protected the line from development in its Local Plan. The 2009 report estimates that reopening the Guildford – Bramley – Cranleigh section would have a positive benefit-cost ratio of 1.7 to 1 including capital costs.

Preceding station	Disused railways	Following station
Guildford; Line closed, station open	London, Brighton and South Coast Railway; Horsham and Guildford Direct Railway	Cranleigh; Line and station closed

== Bibliography ==
- Beeching, Richard (27 March 1963). The Reshaping of British Railways Part 1: Report. London: HMSO.
- Grayer, Jefferey (2024). Horsham – Christ's Hospital – Cranleigh – Guildford. From the Adur to the Wey. Vol. 2. Totem Publishing. ISBN 978-1-91-389349-1.
- Hodd, H.R. (1975). The Horsham–Guildford Direct Railway. Locomotion Papers. Vol. 87. Tarrant Hinton: The Oakwood Press. ISBN 978-0-85-361170-7.
- Jackson, Alan A. (1999). The Railway in Surrey. Penryn: Atlantic Transport Publishers. ISBN 978-0-90-689990-8.
- Mitchell, Vic; Smith, Keith (1984) [1982]. Branch Lines to Horsham. Midhurst: Middleton Press. ISBN 978-0-90-652002-4.
- Morley, David, ed. (1994). Bramley Centenary Guide. Bramley: Bramley Parish Council. ISBN 978-0-95-244980-5.
- Oppitz, Leslie (1988). Surrey Railways Remembered. Newbury: Countryside Books. ISBN 978-1-85-306005-2.
- Turner, J.T. Howard (1978). The London, Brighton & South Coast Railway. Vol. 2 : Establishment and growth. London: B.T. Batsford. ISBN 978-0-71-341198-0.
- Welch, Michael (2001). Surrey Steam. Harrow Weald: Capital Transport. ISBN 978-1-85-414238-2.
- Welch, Michael (2007). Decline of Southern Steam. Harrow Weald: Capital Transport. ISBN 978-1-85-414313-6.
- Wojtczak, Helena (2005). Railwaywomen: Exploitation, Betrayal and Triumph in the Workplace. Hastings: Hastings Press. ISBN 978-1-90-410904-4.
