= Downs Link =

Long-distance path in South East England

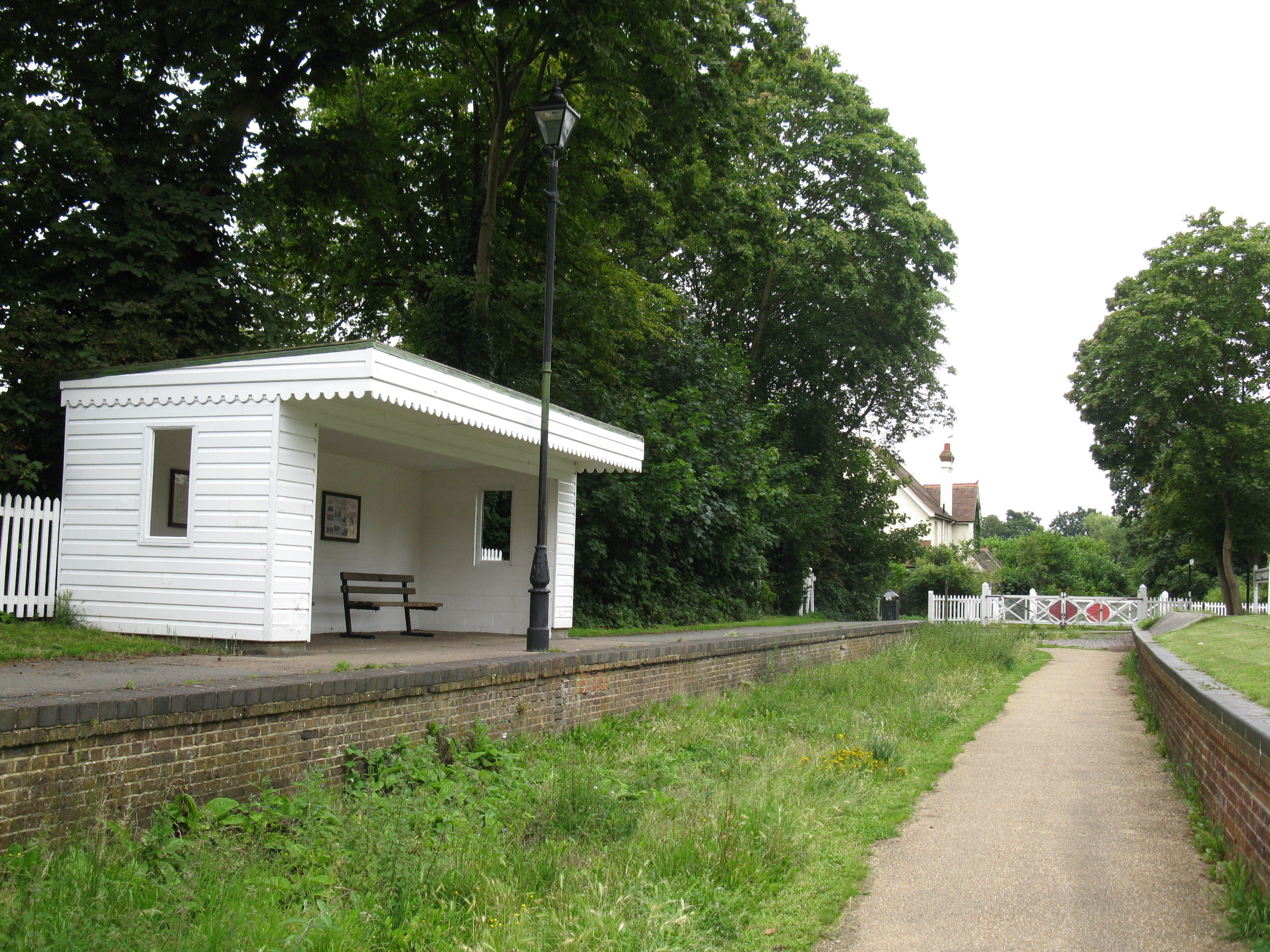
- The Downs Link passing through the former Bramley & Wonersh station
- Length: 36.7 mi (59.1 km)
- Location: South East England
- Trailheads: St Martha's Hill, Surrey; 51°13′31″N 0°31′23″W; Shoreham-by-Sea, West Sussex; 50°50′26″N 0°17′12″W
- Use: Hiking, running, cycling, horse riding

The Downs Link is a 36.7-mile (59.1 km) path and bridleway in South East England. It connects the North Downs Way at St Martha's Hill in Surrey with the South Downs Way near Steyning in West Sussex, from where it continues as the Coastal Link to Shoreham-by-Sea. The majority of the route follows the track beds of two former railway lines, the Cranleigh Line and the Steyning Line, both of which closed in the mid-1960s.

The path was opened from St Martha's Hill to the South Downs Way on 9 July 1984, with ceremonies at the former Baynards station, in Surrey, and at St Botolph's, in West Sussex. The extension to Shoreham-by-Sea opened on 4 October 1993. The path is managed as a collaboration between Surrey County Council, West Sussex County Council and Waverley Borough Council. The Downs Link forms part of National Route 223 of the National Cycle Network, and intersects several other long-distance paths, including the Greensand Way, Wey South Path and Sussex Border Path.

Since much of the Downs Link runs along closed railway lines, the path is mostly gently graded. Evidence of the route's past includes the double bridge over the River Arun at Rudgwick, and station platforms at Bramley & Wonersh, Baynards, Christ's Hospital and West Grinstead. The off-road surface varies between compacted earth, gravel and asphalt, and there are short on-road sections at Christ's Hospital, Partridge Green and Henfield. A fatal collision occurred between a cyclist and a motor vehicle in 2020 at Rudgwick, where local campaigners have called for a bridge to carry the Downs Link over the A281 road.

== Route ==
=== Overview ===
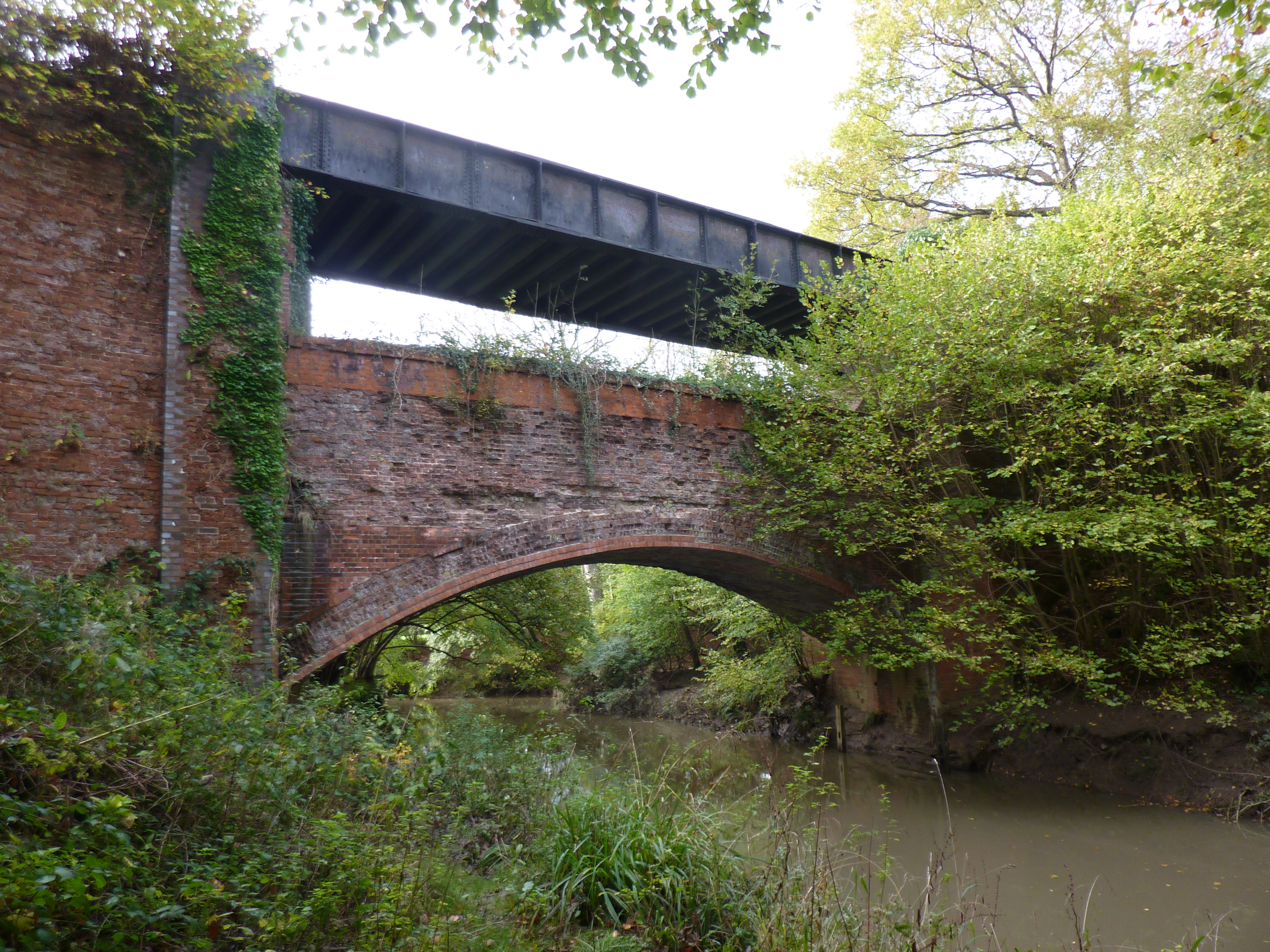
The Downs Link crosses the River Arun on the upper deck of the double bridge south of Rudgwick station

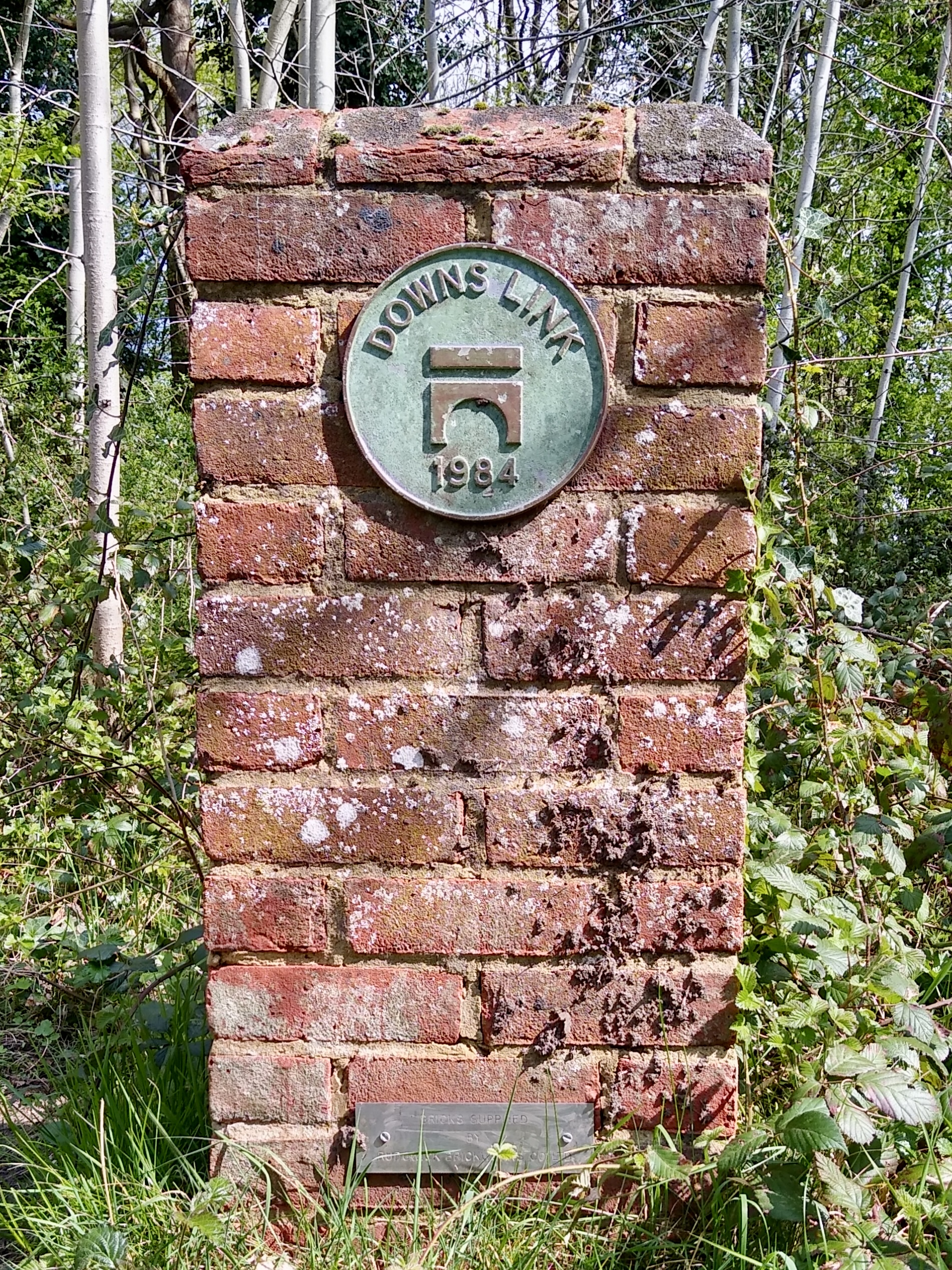
A plaque at Baynards station with the logo of the Downs Link and the year of opening, 1984

The Downs Link is a 36.7-mile (59.1 km) path and bridleway in South East England. It runs from the North Downs Way at St Martha's Hill in Surrey to Shoreham-by-Sea on the English Channel in West Sussex. It is accessible for walkers, cyclists and horse riders. Much of the route runs along the track beds of two former railway lines, which were closed in the mid-1960s. The official emblem of the Downs Link, which appears on direction signs and publicity material, is a stylised version of the Rudgwick double bridge, completed in 1865. (Note: When the Cranleigh Line opened on 2 October 1865, the Board of Trade inspector insisted that Rudgwick station should remain closed until the 1 in 80 gradient to the south was eased. The remedial work included the raising of embankments and a second bridge deck was added 10 ft (3.0 m) above the original brick arch over the River Arun, reducing the gradient to 1 in 130. Rudgwick station opened on 1 November 1865, one month later than the other stations.)

Unlike the National Trails, which are supported by the UK government through Natural England, the Downs Link is a collaborative project between Surrey County Council (SCC), West Sussex County Council (WSCC) and Waverley Borough Council. The path was originally opened in 1984 as a link between the North Downs Way at St Martha's Hill and the South Downs Way at St Botolph's near Steyning, but was extended southwards to Shoreham-by-Sea in 1993. It intersects other long-distance routes, including the Greensand Way, Wey South Path and Sussex Border Path. It also forms part of National Route 223 of the National Cycle Network, which runs from the River Thames at Chertsey to the English Channel.

The northern trailhead, St Martha's Hill, is on the Greensand Ridge, a prominent sandstone escarpment that runs parallel to and south of the North Downs. The well-drained, sandy soils support oak woodland, with an abundance of hazel, holly and hawthorn. South of the River Tillingbourne, the land is marshier and plant species such as alder, poplar and willow can be found. The acidic, sandy soils in the Blackheath and Chinthurst Hill areas support birch, broom and pine, as well as gorse and heather. Between Bramley and Bramber, the Downs Link runs across Weald Clay and the landscape is dominated by open farmland and mature woodland. The southernmost part of the route runs along the broad valley cut through the South Downs by the tidal River Adur. Part of the Adur Estuary is a Site of Special Scientific Interest and provides a habitat for bird species such as lapwing, ringed plover, dunlin and redshank.

Since so much of the Downs Link runs along closed railway lines, the path is mostly gently graded. The steepest sections of the route, north of Chinthurst Hill and south of Baynards, were not part of the original track bed. There are short on-road sections at Christ's Hospital, Partridge Green and Henfield, and the path crosses the busy A281 at Rudgwick. The off-road surface varies between compacted earth, gravel and asphalt, and several guidebooks report that the unpaved sections can be muddy after wet weather.

=== St Martha's Hill to Christ's Hospital ===
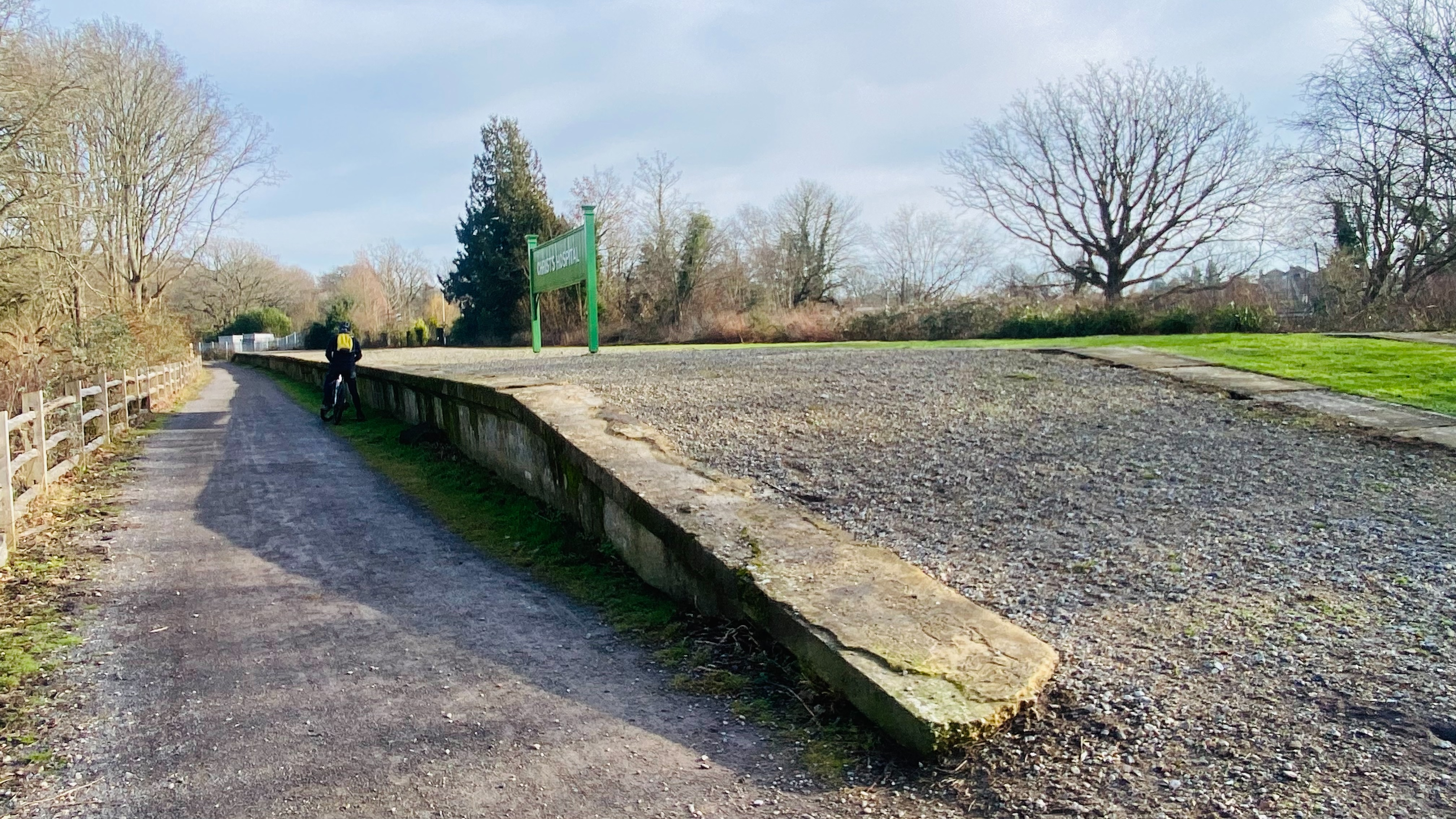
The Downs Link passing the disused Cranleigh Line platforms at Christ's Hospital station

From the northern trailhead on St Martha's Hill, 175 m (574 ft) above ordnance datum, the Downs Link descends into the valley of the River Tillingbourne, before swinging west towards Chinthurst Hill. At Tannery Lane Bridge it is joined by the link from Guildford town centre, opened in 2006. From there, it runs along the alignment of the former Cranleigh Line, passing through the former Bramley & Wonersh station, where the platforms were restored between 2003 and 2005. Between Tannery Lane and the hamlet of Rowly, the disused Wey and Arun Canal is visible in several places, and the path runs parallel to the Cranleigh Waters, a tributary stream of the River Wey.

At Cranleigh, a shopping centre development forces the Downs Link to the south of the original railway alignment, but the route returns to the original track bed at the south end of Snoxhall Fields. Although much of Baynards station survives, it is a private residence and is not accessible to public. From Baynards station, the Downs Link deviates from the course of the Cranleigh Line to climb over the hill above the inaccessible Baynards Tunnel. No trace remains of Rudgwick station, and the bridge over the A281 has also been dismantled. The path crosses the River Arun on the top deck of the double bridge, completed in 1865. Although Slinfold station was completely demolished after the closure of the railway, the Cranleigh Line platforms at Christ's Hospital were restored in 2000.

Points of interest between St Martha's Hill and Christ's Hospital (ordered from north to south)
Point of interest	Description	Coordinates
St Martha's Hill	Northern trailhead on the North Downs Way	51.2253°N 0.5230°W
Bramley & Wonersh station	Platforms refurbished and replica level crossing gates installed in 2003–2005	51.1962°N 0.5561°W
Cranleigh station	Station and goods yard demolished, now the site of the Stocklund Square shopping centre	51.1413°N 0.4923°W
Baynards station	Station is a private residence.	51.1049°N 0.4632°W
Rudgwick station	Station demolished and replaced by a health centre	51.0897°N 0.4509°W
River Arun bridge	The upper bridge deck was installed in 1865 to ease the steep approach to Rudgwick station.	51.0835°N 0.4396°W
Slinfold station	Station demolished and replaced by a caravan park	51.0678°N 0.4134°W
Christ's Hospital station	Station open; abandoned Cranleigh Line platforms restored in 2000	51.0511°N 0.3641°W

=== Christ's Hospital to Shoreham-by-Sea ===
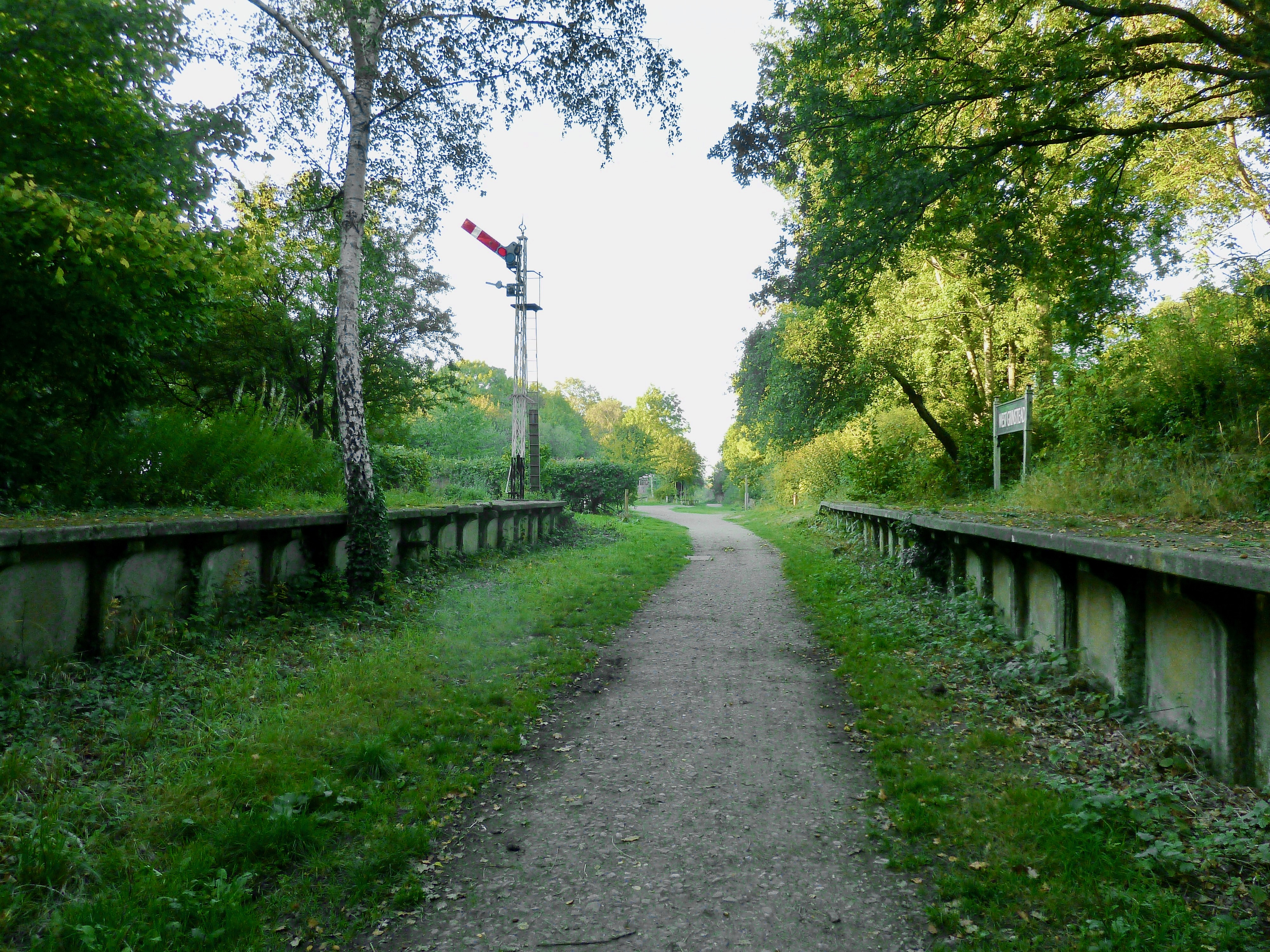
The Downs Link at West Grinstead station

Between Christ's Hospital and Shoreham-by-Sea, the Downs Link mostly follows the route of the former Steyning Line. The path runs through the site of Southwater station, where only short sections of the platforms survive. After passing Southwater Country Park, opened in 1985 on the site of a former brickworks, (Note: The original Steyning Line bridge over Cripplegate Lane, Southwater, was demolished in August 1986, requiring the Downs Link to descend from the railway embankment to cross the road.) it continues under the A24, before reaching West Grinstead station. The platforms at this station are mostly intact, and a railway signal and a replica station sign have been installed by the local parish council. A Mark 1 railway carriage acts as an information point for walkers, and the old stationmaster's house is now a base for the WSCC Low Weald Countryside Rangers. At the south end of West Grinstead station, the path runs beneath the A272 in an underpass tunnel, built in 1987 as part of a road improvement scheme.

There are no traces of the stations at Partridge Green and Henfield, and the Downs Link briefly leaves the railway alignment at both locations to avoid subsequent development. The path crosses the River Adur at Betley Bridge and Stretham Bridge, to the north and south of Henfield respectively. Between Stretham Bridge and Bramber Castle, it diverges from the route of the Steyning Line to avoid sections of the former track bed in private ownership. (Note: An alternative walking route for pedestrians only is available along the bank of the River Adur between Stretham Bridge and St Botolph's near Bramber.) The original railway bridge at Beeding was dismantled after the Steyning Line closed, and so the Downs Link crosses the River Adur for the third time via Bramber Bridge, which it shares with the South Downs Way. The path then follows the east bank of the river for the remaining 2.7 mi (4.3 km) to Shoreham-by-Sea, passing to the west of Shoreham cement works, where it rejoins the former track bed. The Downs Link remains on the former railway alignment to its southern terminus, close to Shoreham-by-Sea station.

Points of interest between Christ's Hospital and Shoreham-by-Sea (ordered from north to south)
Point of interest	Description	Coordinates
Christ's Hospital	School designed by Aston Webb and opened in 1902	51.0442°N 0.3631°W
Itchingfield Junction	The Steyning Line diverged from the Arun Valley Line at this junction.	51.0421°N 0.3706°W
Southwater station	The Lintott Square development, completed in 2004, covers most of the station site, but short sections of the platforms remain.	51.0242°N 0.3520°W
Southwater Country Park	The 54-acre (22 ha) country park opened in June 1985 on the site of a former brickworks.	51.0203°N 0.3461°W
West Grinstead station	Platforms survive; a Mark 1 railway carriage stands in the former goods yard	50.9895°N 0.3143°W
Partridge Green station	Station demolished and replaced by an industrial estate	50.9574°N 0.3069°W
Betley Bridge	The original railway bridge crosses the eastern branch of the River Adur	50.9446°N 0.2933°W
Henfield station	Station demolished and replaced by residential development	50.9321°N 0.2851°W
Stretham Bridge	The original railway bridge crosses the River Adur	50.9099°N 0.2946°W
Steyning station	Station demolished and replaced by Steyning bypass	50.8895°N 0.3213°W
Bramber Castle	A ruined motte-and-bailey castle occupied from 1075 to c. 1450	50.8839°N 0.3162°W
Bramber station	Station demolished and replaced by a roundabout on the Steyning bypass	50.8818°N 0.3164°W
Bramber Bridge	The South Downs Way also crosses the River Adur on this bridge, which was opened in 1974.	50.8708°N 0.3012°W
Shoreham cement works	Served by rail until 1981	50.8647°N 0.2967°W
Shoreham Tollbridge	Erected in 1781; Grade II* listed	50.8406°N 0.2880°W
Shoreham-by-Sea	Southern trailhead	50.8337°N 0.2810°W

== History ==
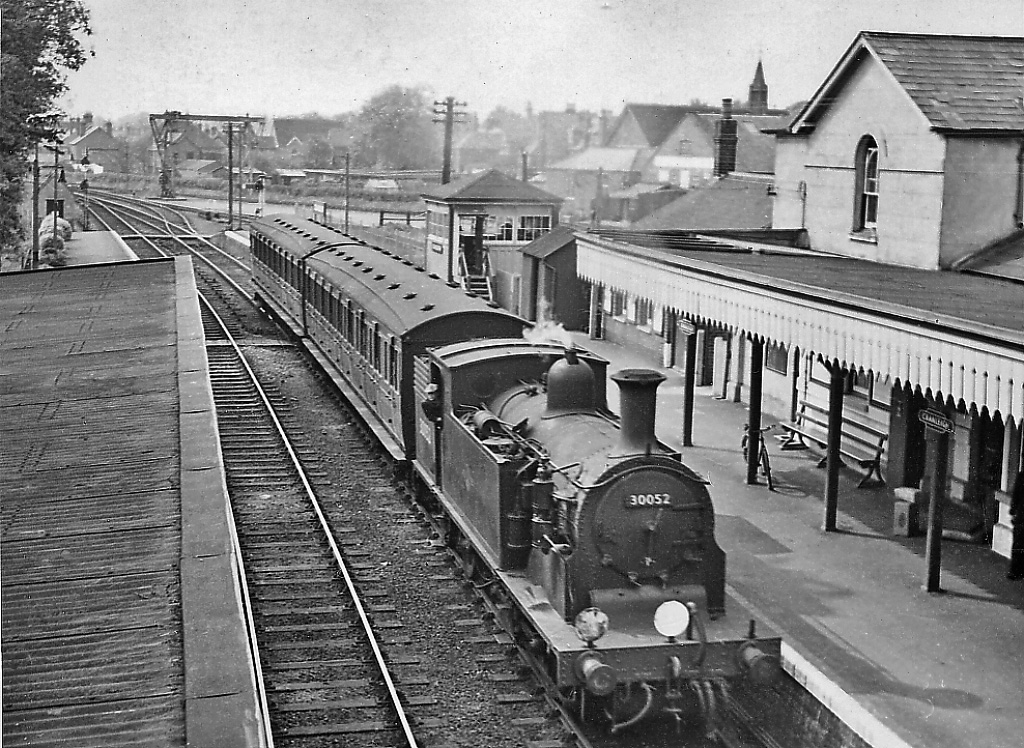
Cranleigh station in 1957

For much of its route, the Downs Link follows the course of two dismantled railways: the Cranleigh Line, which ran from Peasmarsh Junction near Guildford to Christ's Hospital station, and the Steyning Line, which ran from Christ's Hospital to Shoreham-by-Sea. Both were listed for closure in the 1963 Beeching report, and passenger services were withdrawn from 14 June 1965 (Cranleigh Line) and 7 March 1966 (Steyning Line). Freight services continued to operate on the southernmost section of the Steyning Line, between the cement works at Beeding and Shoreham-by-Sea, until 1981.

Following a failed proposal to run a private train service over the Cranleigh Line, the track was lifted in April 1966, and dismantling work on the Steyning Line began that October. In December 1966, West Sussex County Council (WSCC) agreed to buy the track beds of the lines south of the border with Surrey, for £165,000 (equivalent to £2.68 million in 2025), with the intention of converting parts of the routes into roads. In April 1970, much of the route north of Baynards Tunnel was bought by Surrey County Council (SCC) and Hambledon Rural District Council.

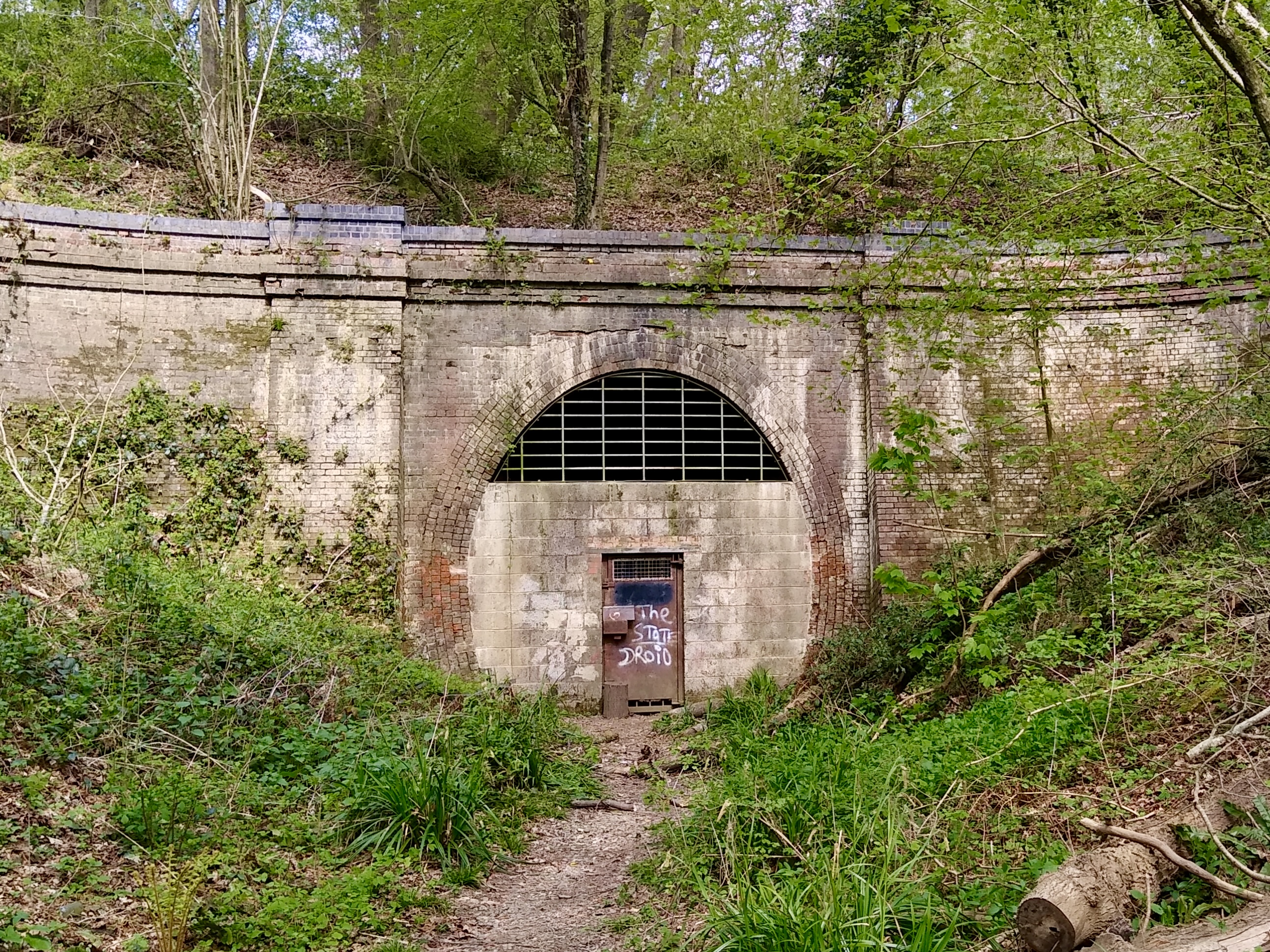
The bricked-up southern portal of Baynards Tunnel

A year after the Cranleigh Line closed, Hambledon Rural District Council suggested that the track bed should be turned into a "walking freeway". In 1973, it signed a seven-year lease on the part of the railway that had been purchased by SCC with the intention of creating a "greenway" between Gosden, north of Bramley, and the border with West Sussex. (Note: On 1 April 1974, Hambledon Rural District became part of Waverley District, which became the Borough of Waverley on 21 February 1984.) The works included sealing the entrances to Baynards Tunnel with concrete blocks and filling the cutting on the northern approach with inert waste to create a ramped access to Cox Green Road. A strip of land was purchased to enable the path to reach the county boundary, and drainage, fencing and landscaping works were also undertaken. The total cost of £15,000 (equivalent to £163,000 in 2025) was funded from the sale of Baynards station.

In West Sussex, WSCC began to sell off and infill sections of the railway lines. In 1968, it authorised the filling of cuttings with domestic waste at Southwater and north of Steyning. Rudgwick and Slinfold stations were demolished and their sites were used for a health centre and caravan park respectively. Similarly, the station sites at Partridge Green and Henfield were sold for development. Construction of the Steyning bypass, which runs along part of the former railway line, began in summer 1978 and was completed in July 1981.

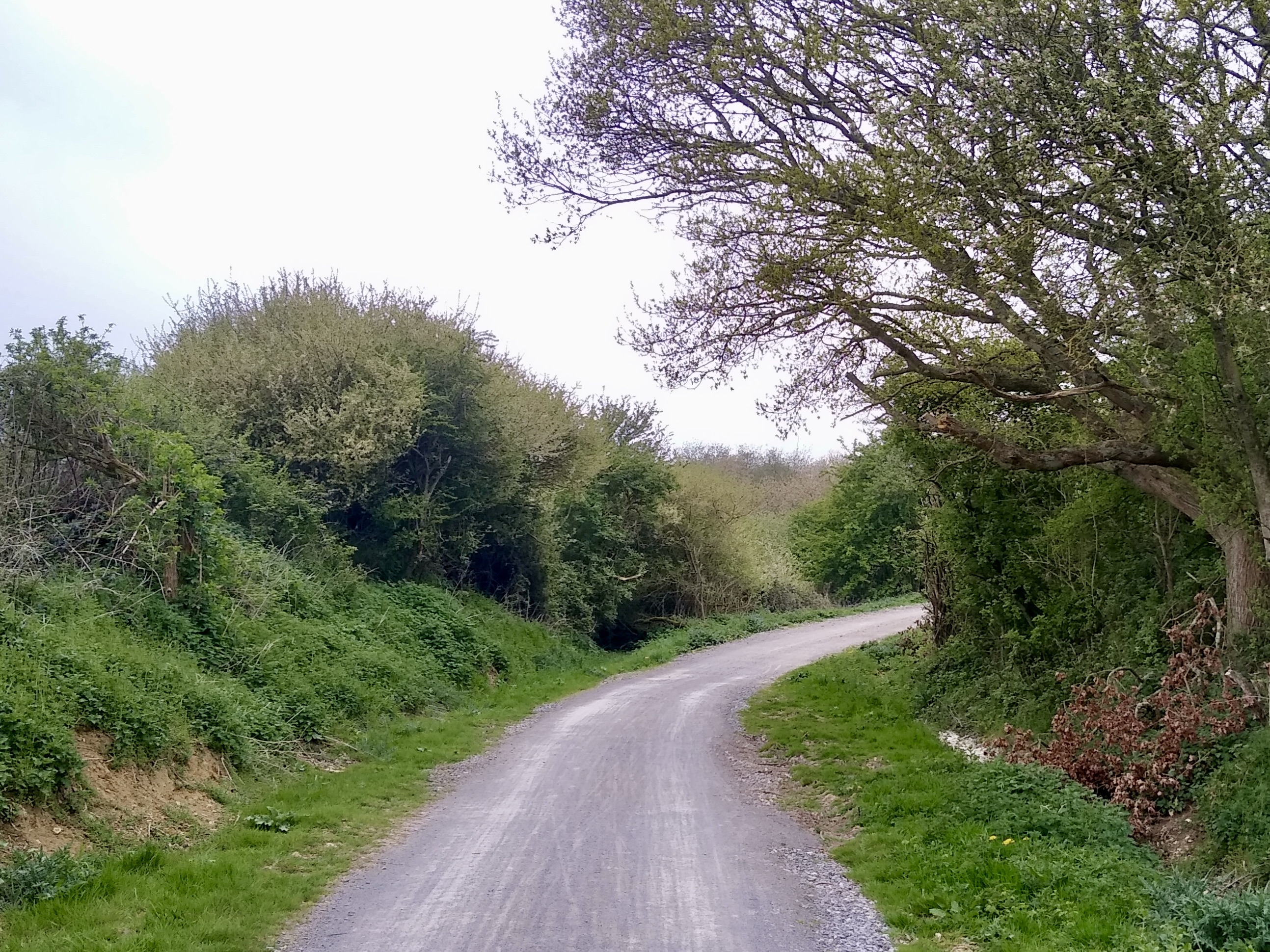
Looking southwards along the Downs Link at the northern end of the Wappingthorne estate: The path turns to the right to avoid a section of former track bed in private ownership.

Plans for a unified long-distance pathway along the courses of the old railways began to emerge in the early 1970s. A report for Hambledon Rural District Council, published in 1971, recommended the development of a route from Bramley to Shoreham-by-Sea, and assessed the cost of infrastructure works to be around £500 per mile (equivalent to £6,000 in 2025) with an estimated annual maintenance cost of £100 per mile. Work to create the new path began at the end of that decade. In 1978, new bridleways were designated north of Steyning, bypassing a section of the railway that had been bought by the Wappingthorne estate. (Note: The total cost of the pathway works in West Sussex was £40,000 (equivalent to £172,000 in 2025), part of which was funded by a grant of £8,600 awarded by the Countryside Commission in May 1980.) At Cranleigh, a diversion from the railway route was required to bypass the Stocklund Square development, but the Bonham Trust initially refused permission to create a new bridleway through Snoxhall Fields, which it owned.

The Downs Link, connecting the North Downs Way at St Martha's Hill to the South Downs Way at St Botolph's near Steyning, was formally opened on 9 July 1984 with ceremonies at Baynards station and at the southern terminus of the new route. The path was a joint project between SCC, WSCC and Waverley Borough Council. The Downs Link received a commendation in the 1985 National Conservation Award Scheme jointly organised by The Times newspaper and the Royal Institution of Chartered Surveyors. That December, Waverley Borough Council and the Bonham Trust concluded a Path Creation Order Agreement, allowing the route through Cranleigh to be finalised. The underpass tunnel beneath the A272, at the south end of the former West Grinstead station, was built in 1987, when the original humpback road bridge was replaced by the current structure. The Downs Link extension from the South Downs Way at St Botolph's to Shoreham-by-Sea, also known as the Coastal Link, opened on 4 October 1993.

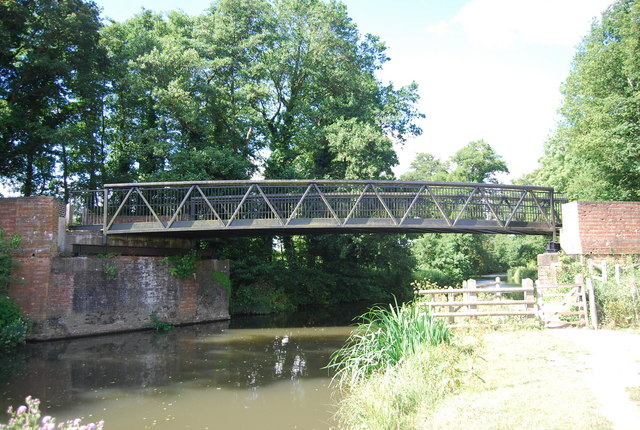
The Downs Link bridge over the River Wey

In the early 21st century, two separate projects allowed the path to be extended over additional sections of the former Cranleigh Line. Firstly, the demolished railway bridge over the River Wey was rebuilt in July 2006, allowing easier access to the Downs Link from Guildford town centre. Secondly, the 0.87 mi (1.4 km) section of the track bed east of Slinfold became part of the route in September 2020. The project, which was funded as a collaboration between Christ's Hospital school and WSCC, included the restoration of the Cranleigh Line platforms at Christ's Hospital station. It was made possible through the creation of a new right-of-way between Baystone Bridge and the station in December 2004. (Note: The 2004 Definitive Map Modification Order that created a right-of-way along the southernmost part of the former Cranleigh Line, between Baystone Bridge and Christ's Hospital station, was unsuccessfully challenged at an inquiry held in December 2006.)

== Incidents ==
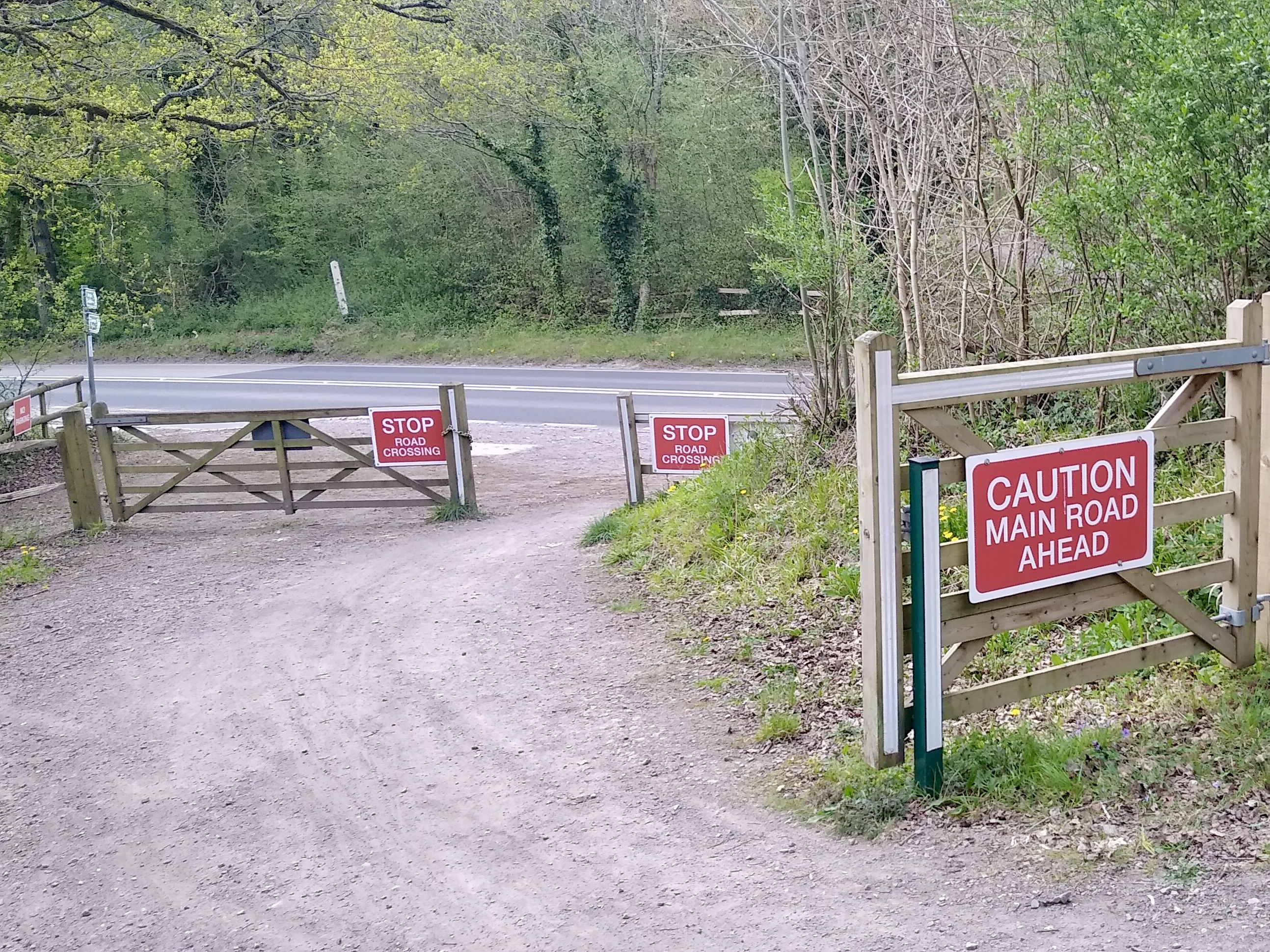
The approach to the A281 road crossing from the south in 2025

In July 2020, a fatal accident occurred near Rudgwick, in which a cyclist was killed at the intersection between the Downs Link and the A281. (Note: The original railway bridge over the A281 at Rudgwick, known as Swaynes Bridge, was demolished in November 1967 by West Sussex County Council.) At the inquest into the death the following year, the coroner criticised the signage on the approach to the junction from the Downs Link as "inadequate". A campaign by local residents and the family of the victim called for the replacement of the crossing with a bridge. However, a study by WSCC estimated that the cost would be around £2 million and instead proposed the installation of a pegasus crossing, with traffic lights, which would be significantly cheaper. A horse was hit by a car at the same crossing in May 2023.

== See also ==
- Cuckoo Trail
- Forest Way
- Worth Way
- List of rail trails

== Bibliography ==
- Beeching, Richard (27 March 1963a). The Reshaping of British Railways Part 1: Report. London: HMSO.
- Beeching, Richard (27 March 1963b). The Reshaping of British Railways Part 2: Maps. London: HMSO.
- Buckman, James (2002). The Steyning Line. Seaford: SB Publications. ISBN 978-1-85-770254-5.
- Budgen, Christopher (2008). Cranleigh: A History. Chichester: Phillimore. ISBN 978-1-86-077503-1.
- Cotton, Nick; Rogers, Kathy (2022). Traffic-free Cycle Trails: South East England. Sheffield: Vertebrate Publishing. ISBN 978-1-83-981164-7.
- d'Enno, Douglas (2016). Sussex Railway Stations through time. Stroud: Amberley Publishing. ISBN 978-1-44-564876-7.
- Evans, Jeremy (1995). Great Cycle Routes: The North and South Downs. Marlborough: Crowood Press. ISBN 978-1-85-223850-6.
- Gallois, R.W. (1965). The Wealden District. British Regional Geology. Keyworth: British Geological Survey. ISBN 978-0-11-884078-1.
- Mitchell, Vic; Smith, Keith (1984) [1982]. Branch Lines to Horsham. Midhurst: Middleton Press. ISBN 978-0-90-652002-4.
- Oppitz, Leslie (1987). Sussex Railways Remembered. Newbury: Countryside Books. ISBN 978-0-90-539299-8.
- Oppitz, Leslie (1988). Surrey Railways Remembered. Newbury: Countryside Books. ISBN 978-1-85-306005-2.
- Reynolds, Kev (1989). The South Downs Way & the Downs Link. Milnethorpe: Cicerone Press. ISBN 978-1-85-284023-5.
- Vinter, Jeff (1990). Railway Walks: GWR & SR. Gloucester: Alan Sutton Publishing. ISBN 978-0-86-299722-9.
- "Surrey Landscape Character Assessment: Waverley Borough" (PDF). Hankinson Duckett Associates. April 2015.
- "Downs Link: Six Stage Route Guide" (PDF). Chichester: West Sussex County Council. 31 October 2019.
