= Betley Bridge =

Rail trail bridge in West Sussex, England

Coordinates: 50.9446°N 0.2933°W

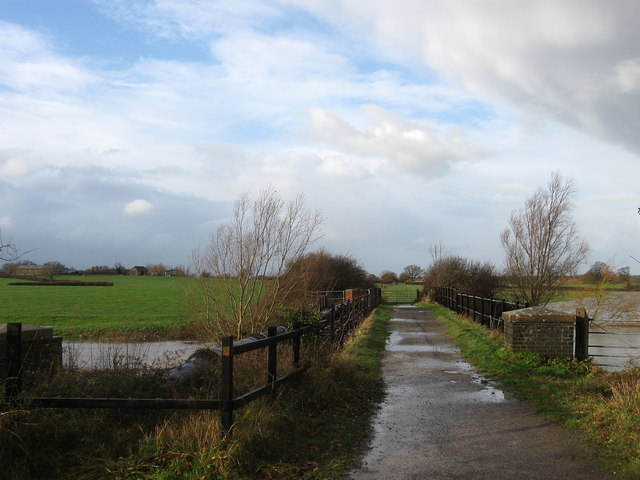
Betley Bridge - a former railway bridge now carrying the Downs Link long distance footpath over the River Adur.

Betley Bridge is a disused railway bridge, now a rail trail bridge, which crosses the confluence of the East and West Adur rivers North of Henfield in West Sussex. The Steyning Line from Shoreham to Guildford passed over it, and is now the part of the Downs Link, a public footpath.

During the Second World War the Steyning Line was an important route to move sugar beet from Sussex farms from Henfield station towards the capital, and Betley Bridge was a strategic target for German bombers. Two pillboxes were created, one North and one South, to defend the bridge. A Junkers Ju 88 which was attacking the bridge crashed in Partridge Green to the North West.
