= Southwater railway station =

Former railway station in England

Coordinates: 51.0241°N 0.3518°W

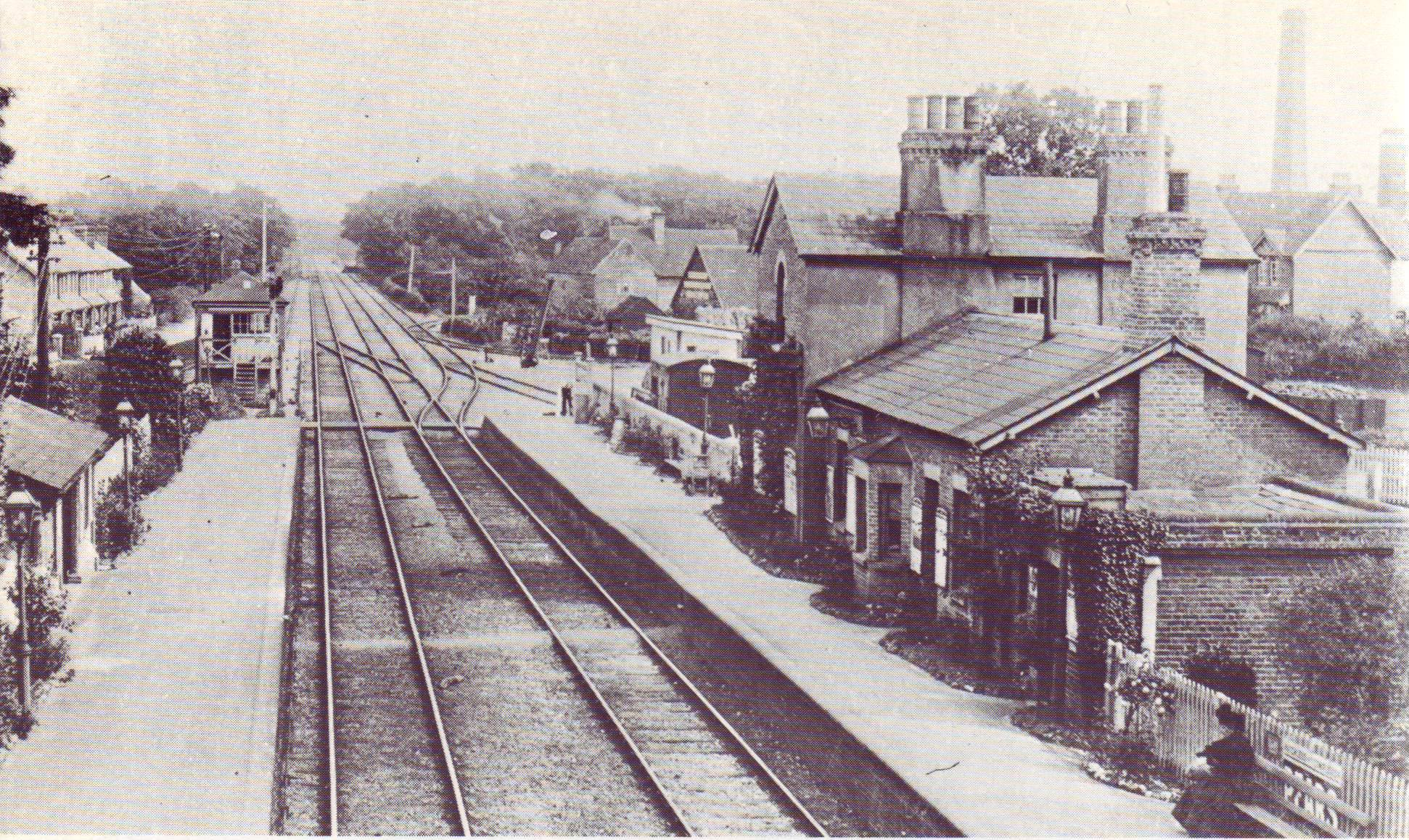

General information
- Location: Southwater, Horsham, West Sussex; England
- Grid reference: TQ157263
- Platforms: 2

Other information
- Status: Disused

History
- Pre-grouping: London, Brighton and South Coast Railway
- Post-grouping: Southern Railway; Southern Region of British Railways

Key dates
- 16 September 1861: Opened
- 7 March 1966: Closed
Location

Southwater railway station was a railway station on the Steyning Line which served the village of Southwater. A goods siding allowed for the transportation of coal and other raw materials to and from Southwater Brickworks.

The station closed as a result of the Beeching Axe in 1966, the station demolished and the site covered with housing development. West Sussex County Council had previously owned the site of the former railway station (as well as the trackbed) but, with the growth of the village and the need for a library and police service, the County Council sold the land to Horsham District Council for a price of up to £1.3 million so that these facilities could be provided. The subsequent development required the re-alignment of Worthing Road which was previously carried over the railway line by a bridge. This section was closed and a new road now cuts through the heart of the former station site. The local parish council have erected a replica station sign in the vicinity.

Preceding station	Disused railways	Following station
Christ's Hospital	British Rail; Southern Region; Steyning Line	West Grinstead

== See also ==
- List of closed railway stations in Britain
