= Partridge Green railway station =

Former railway station in West Sussex

Coordinates: 50.9574°N 0.3063°W

General information
- Location: Partridge Green, Horsham, West Sussex; England
- Grid reference: TQ190189
- Platforms: 2

Other information
- Status: Disused

History
- Pre-grouping: London, Brighton and South Coast Railway
- Post-grouping: Southern Railway; Southern Region of British Railways

Key dates
- 1 July 1861: Opened
- 7 March 1966: Closed
Location

Partridge Green railway station was a railway station on the Steyning Line which served the village of Partridge Green.

The station closed as a result of the Beeching Axe in 1966 and now forms part of the Downs Link footpath.

The station buildings have been obliterated by housing and the Star Road Industrial Estate.

Preceding station	Disused railways	Following station
West Grinstead	British Rail; Southern Region; Steyning Line	Henfield

== See also ==
- List of closed railway stations in Britain
