= West Grinstead railway station =

Former railway station in England

Coordinates: 50.9895°N 0.3143°W

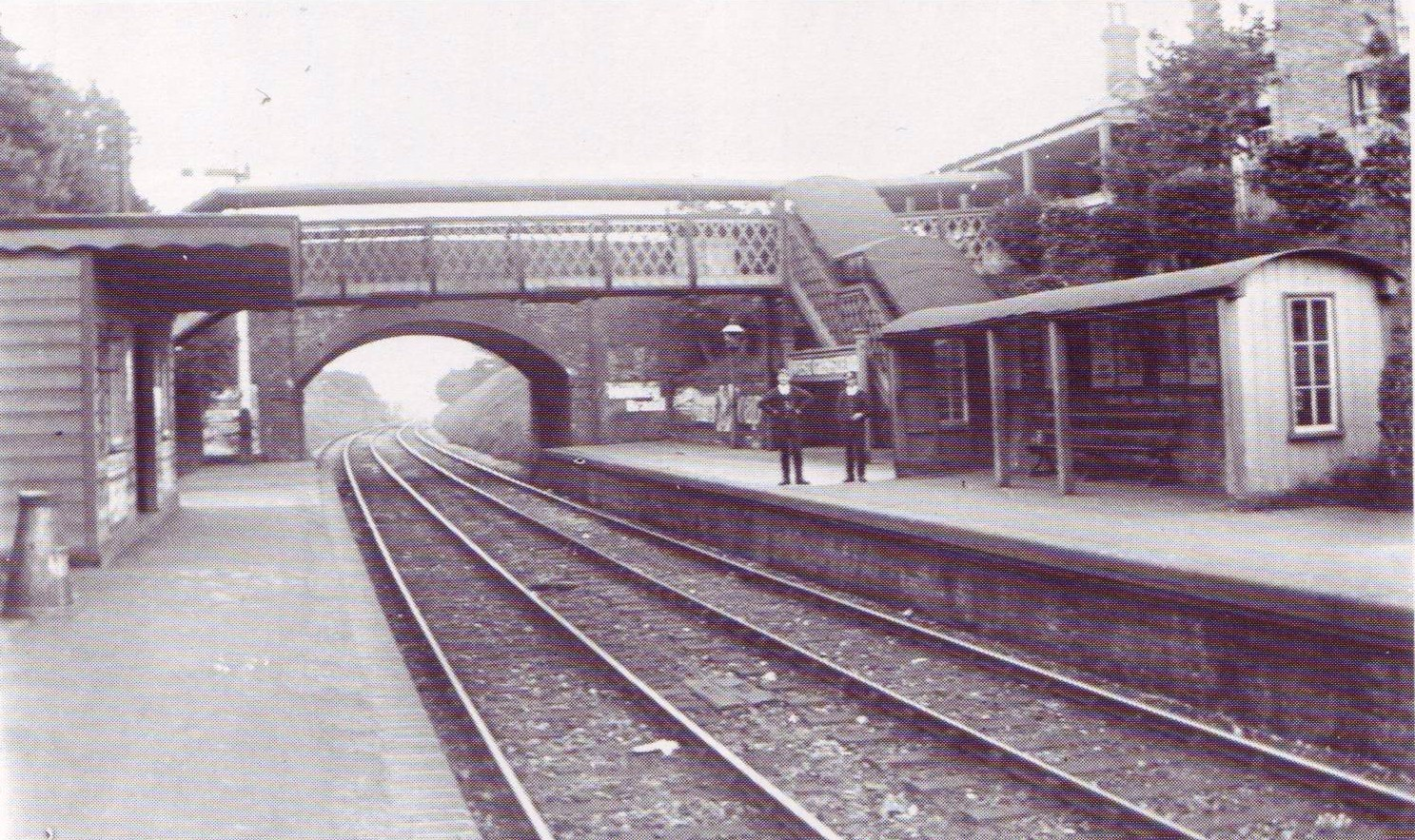

General information
- Location: West Grinstead, Horsham, West Sussex; England
- Grid reference: TQ184225
- Platforms: 2

Other information
- Status: Disused

History
- Pre-grouping: London, Brighton and South Coast Railway
- Post-grouping: Southern Railway; Southern Region of British Railways

Key dates
- 16 Sep 1861: Opened
- 7 March 1966: Closed
Location

West Grinstead railway station was a railway station on the Steyning Line which served the village of West Grinstead. It had a goods yard with a cattle loading bay and facilities for handling horse boxes. With the hunt kennels and national stud based in the area, the station saw substantial horse traffic.

The station closed as a result of the Beeching Axe in 1966 and now forms part of the Downs Link footpath. The main station building and station worker's cottages, although now privately owned, remain, as do the station platforms. The old stationmaster's house is now a base for the WSCC Low Weald Countryside Rangers. The local parish council have erected a replica station sign in the vicinity, and an old railway signal has also been installed. A British Railways Mark 1 railway carriage has also been placed on rails in the former goods yard.

At the south end of West Grinstead station, the Downs Link runs beneath the A272 in an underpass tunnel. It was built in 1987, when the original humpback road bridge over the railway was replaced by the current structure.

Preceding station	Disused railways	Following station
Southwater	British Rail; Southern Region; Steyning Line	Partridge Green

== Gallery ==
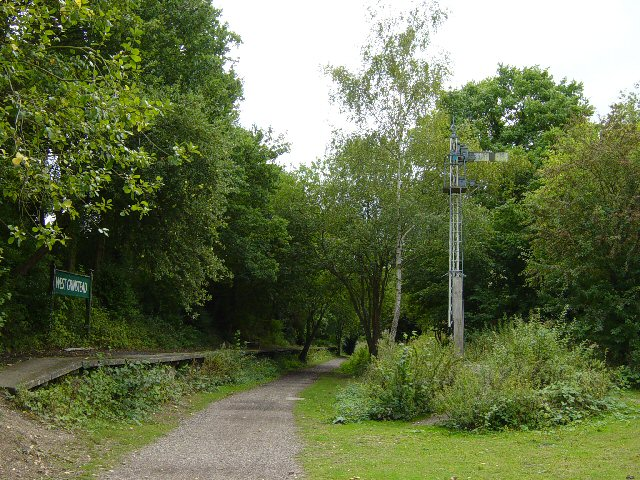
Station remains as part of the Downs Link.

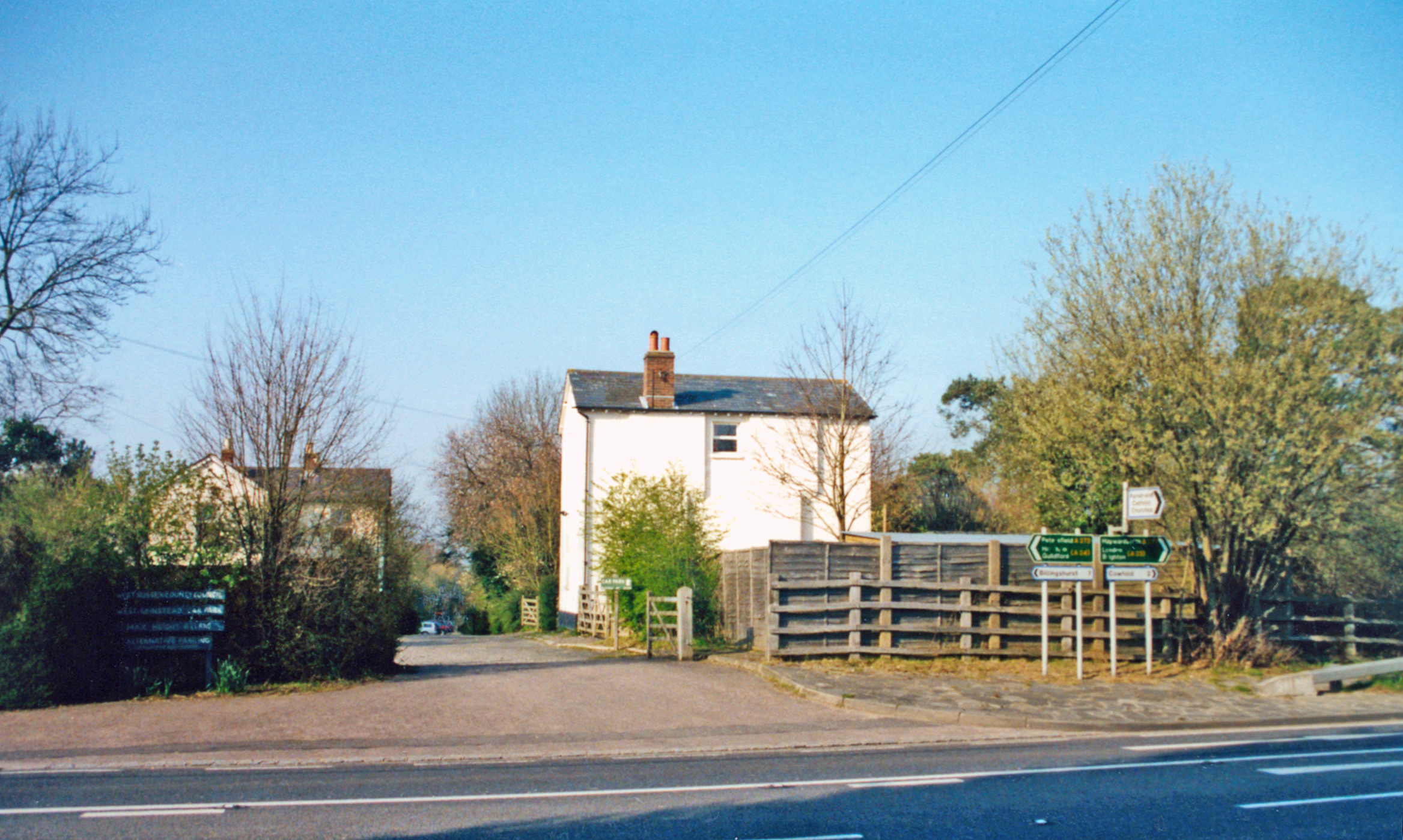
West Grinstead station remains.

== See also ==
- List of closed railway stations in Britain
