= Partridge Green =

Village in West Sussex, England

Coordinates: 50.9589°N 0.30798°W

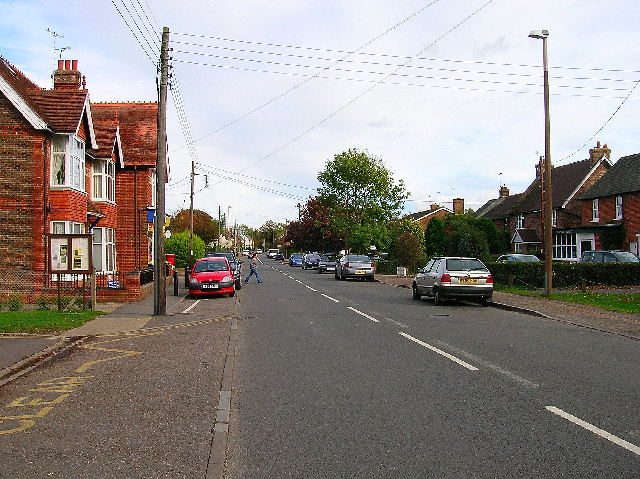
- High Street, Partridge Green

- Location within West Sussex
- OS grid reference: TQ189190
  - London: 35 mi (56 km) NNE
- Civil parish: West Grinstead
- District: Horsham
- Shire county: West Sussex
- Region: South East
- Country: England
- Sovereign state: United Kingdom
- Post town: HORSHAM
- Postcode district: RH13
- Dialling code: 01403
- Police: Sussex
- Fire: West Sussex
- Ambulance: South East Coast
- UK Parliament: Arundel and South Downs

Partridge Green is a village in the Horsham District of West Sussex, England. It lies on the B2135 road 2.5 miles (4 km) north-west of Henfield. It is in the parish of West Grinstead.

Partridge Green takes its name from a family called Partrych who were registered in the area in 1332. The name Partrych comes from the medieval word Petriche, the word for a snarer of partridges. Jolesfield was the original medieval settlement and it was only in 1861 that the village started to develop with the arrival of the Horsham to Shoreham railway line (see Steyning Line and Partridge Green railway station). St Michael and All Angels Church was built in the 1890 to keep up with the increase in population.

The settlement in what today is Partridge Green originated around the road junction of the B2135 and B2116 with several houses (in 1840 there were around six houses) and an inn called the Hare and Hounds, which was one of the meeting places for the West Grinstead Hundred court between 1786 and 1802.

With the arrival of the railway, the inn was replaced with a new building called the Station Inn (later Station Hotel). After the closure of the railway in 1966 it was renamed The Partridge and in 2011 it was taken over by the Dark Star Brewery, also based in the village. It is now a Free House and is no longer the Dark Star Brewery Tap, although it still sells Dark Star beers.

While being small, the village has several businesses: a pub, several shops, a fish and chip shop and a veterinary surgery. In addition Downs Link, a bridleway popular with cyclists and walkers, runs along the side of the village.

West Sussex County Council Fire and Rescue Service also has a small station in the village.
