= West Grinstead =

Village and parish in West Sussex, England

Coordinates: 50.9741°N 0.33309°W

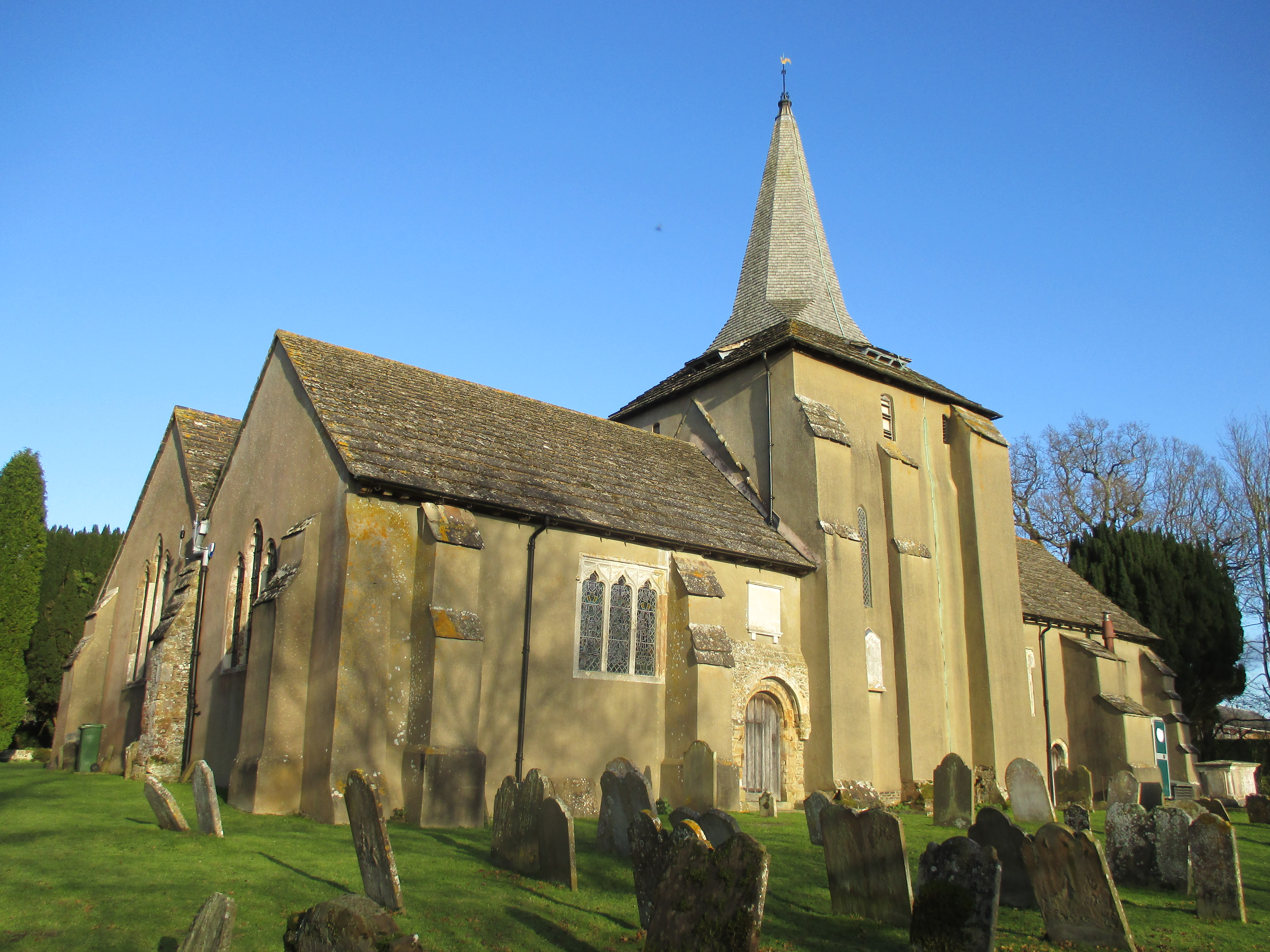
- St. George's Church, West Grinstead

- Location within West Sussex
- Area: 25.84 km^{2} (9.98 sq mi)
- Population: 2,934 2001 Census; 3,054 (2011 Census)
  - Density: 114/km^{2} (300/sq mi)
- OS grid reference: TQ171207
  - London: 38 miles (61 km) NNE
- Civil parish: West Grinstead
- District: Horsham
- Shire county: West Sussex
- Region: South East
- Country: England
- Sovereign state: United Kingdom
- Post town: HORSHAM
- Postcode district: RH13
- Dialling code: 01403
- Police: Sussex
- Fire: West Sussex
- Ambulance: South East Coast
- UK Parliament: Arundel and South Downs

West Grinstead (/ˈɡrɪnstɛd, -stɪd/) is a village and civil parish in the Horsham District of West Sussex, England. It lies just off the B2135 road four miles (6.3 km) northwest from Henfield. It is within the ancient division of the Rape of Bramber. The western River Adur flows through the village.

The parish of West Grinstead covers an area of 2584 hectares (6382 acres) and consists of the villages of West Grinstead, Littleworth, Partridge Green and Dial Post. In the 2001 census 2934 people lived in 1099 households, of whom 1547 were economically active. At the 2011 Census the population was 3,054

The village should not be confused with the much larger town of East Grinstead which lies 17.5 miles (28 km) to the north-east.

== Churches ==
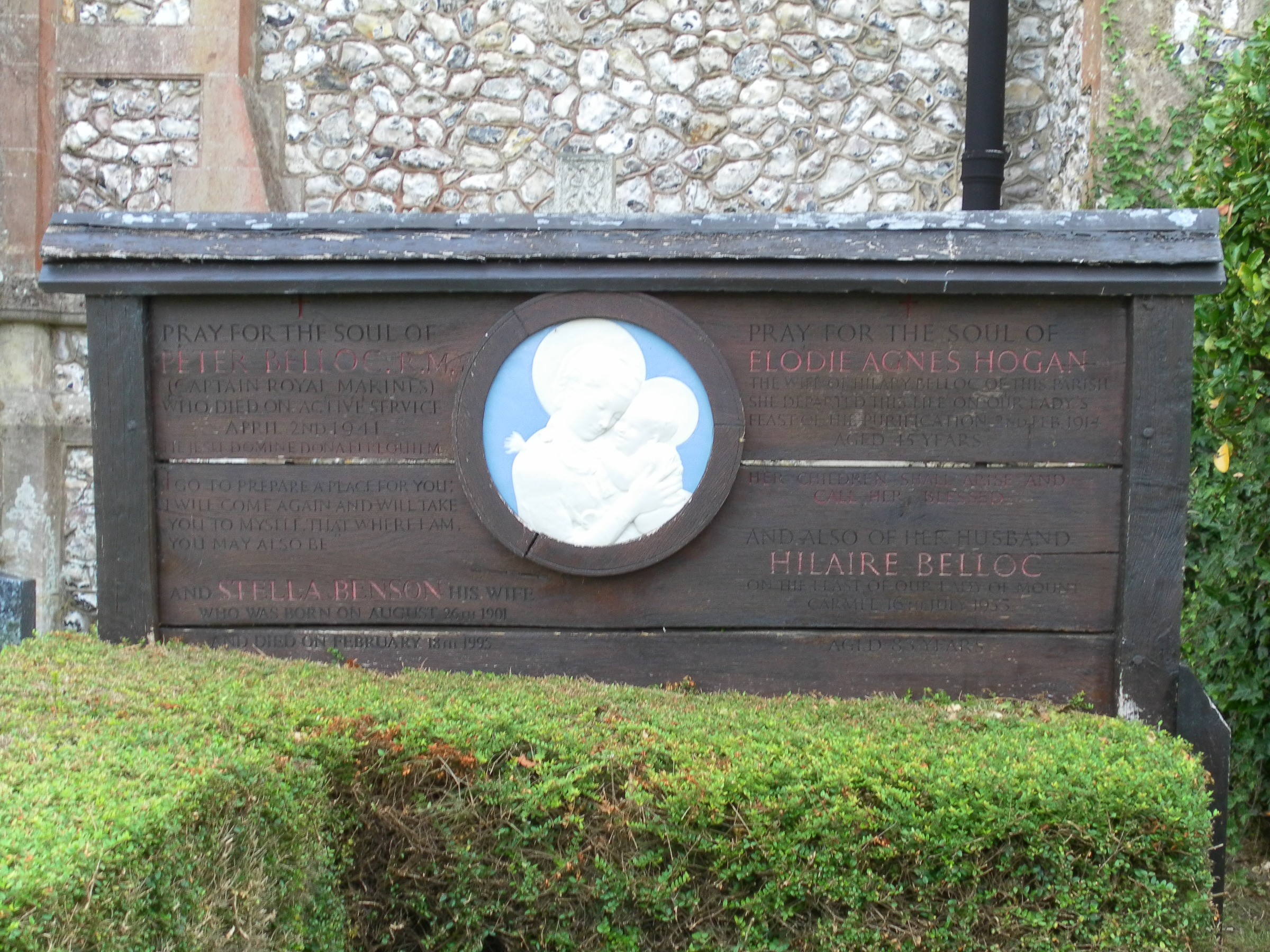
Belloc family grave

The Shrine of Our Lady of Consolation dates from 1876 and is the Roman Catholic parish church. It is an important centre of Catholic pilgrimage in England. Two notable figures are buried in its grounds: Anglo-French writer and poet Hilaire Belloc (friend of fellow Catholic, G. K. Chesterton) and English writer Antonia White.

St George's Church is the Church of England parish church. Its mission is shared with St Michael and All Angels Church, Partridge Green.

== History ==
The early 19th-century Knepp Castle

Knepp Castle is located to the west of the village near the A24. It was a motte castle and founded in the 12th century by William de Braose. Some remains of the keep still stand.

The modern Knepp Castle nearby is a castellated mansion by John Nash.

== Leisure ==
A bus stop east of Knepp Castle

The Downs Link long-distance path runs through the parish and can be used for walking or cycling.

== Notable people ==
- Megan Bruce (born 2004), racing driver
