= Henfield railway station =

Former railway station in England

Coordinates: 50.9320°N 0.2853°W

General information
- Location: Henfield, Horsham, West Sussex; England
- Grid reference: TQ206161
- Platforms: 2

Other information
- Status: Disused

History
- Pre-grouping: London, Brighton and South Coast Railway
- Post-grouping: Southern Railway; Southern Region of British Railways

Key dates
- 1 July 1861: Opened
- 7 March 1966: Closed
Location

Henfield railway station was a railway station on the Steyning Line which served the village of Henfield. It was equipped with a siding which received coal to serve the Steam Mill and Gas Works.

Henfield Station was used in the Second World War as the loading point for locally grown sugar beet to be transported North to London, and Betley Bridge where the line crossed the River Adur about 1 mile (1.6 km) to the North was a strategic target for German bombers.

The station closed as a result of the Beeching Axe in 1966 . Nothing remains of the station today other than the name "Station Road". A housing estate named "Beechings" occupies much of the station's site and now forms part of the Downs Link path. It is somewhat ironically given that it was British Rail Chairman Richard Beeching whose report recommended closure of the line.

Preceding station	Disused railways	Following station
Partridge Green	British Rail; Southern Region; Steyning Line	Steyning

== See also ==
- List of closed railway stations in Britain
