= Wey South Path =

Long-distance footpath in Surrey and West Sussex, England

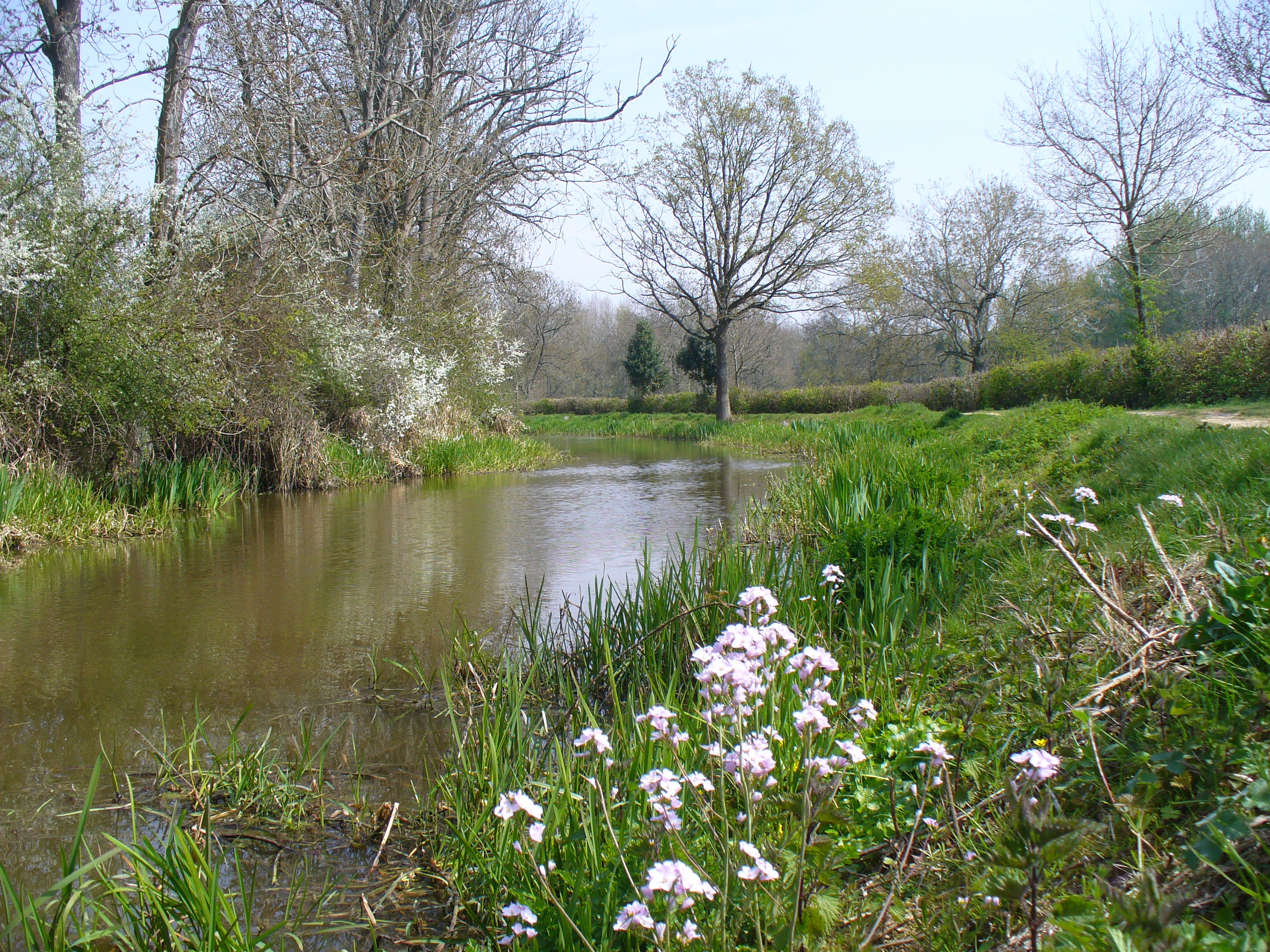
View of the canal at Loxwood

The Wey South Path is a Long Distance Path in Surrey and West Sussex, England. For part of its 32-mile route it follows the banks of the River Wey and of the Wey and Arun Canal.

== The route ==
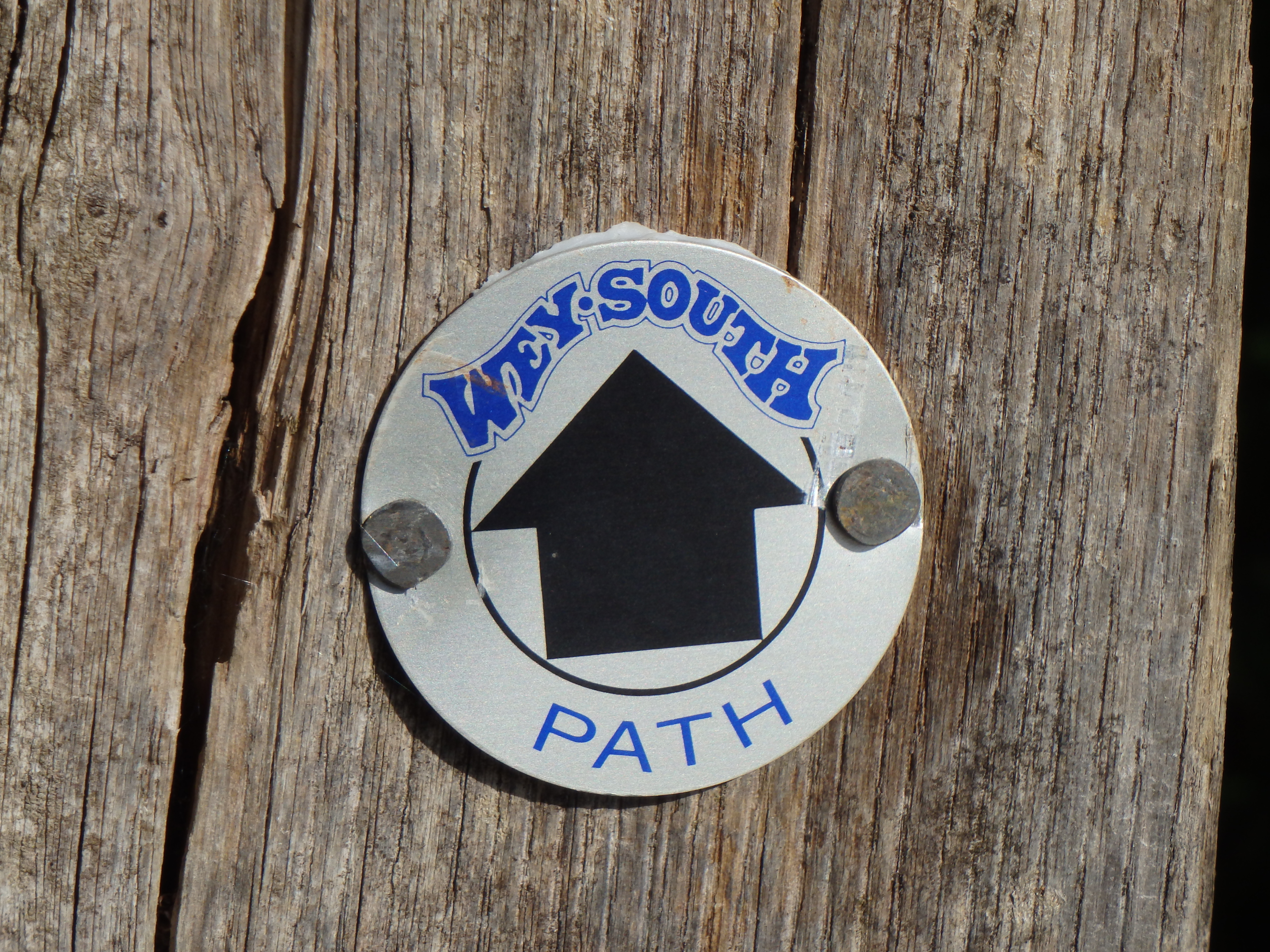
Waymarker

- Guildford
- Stonebridge
- Bramley
- Run Common
- Elmbridge
- Fast Bridge
- The Three Compasses
- Highbridge
- Loxwood
- Drungewick Lane
- Newbridge
- Harsfold
- Stopham
- Greatham
- Houghton Bridge

== See also ==
- Long-distance footpaths in the UK
