= Chinthurst Hill =

Protected area in Surrey, England

Coordinates: 51.203°N 0.553°W

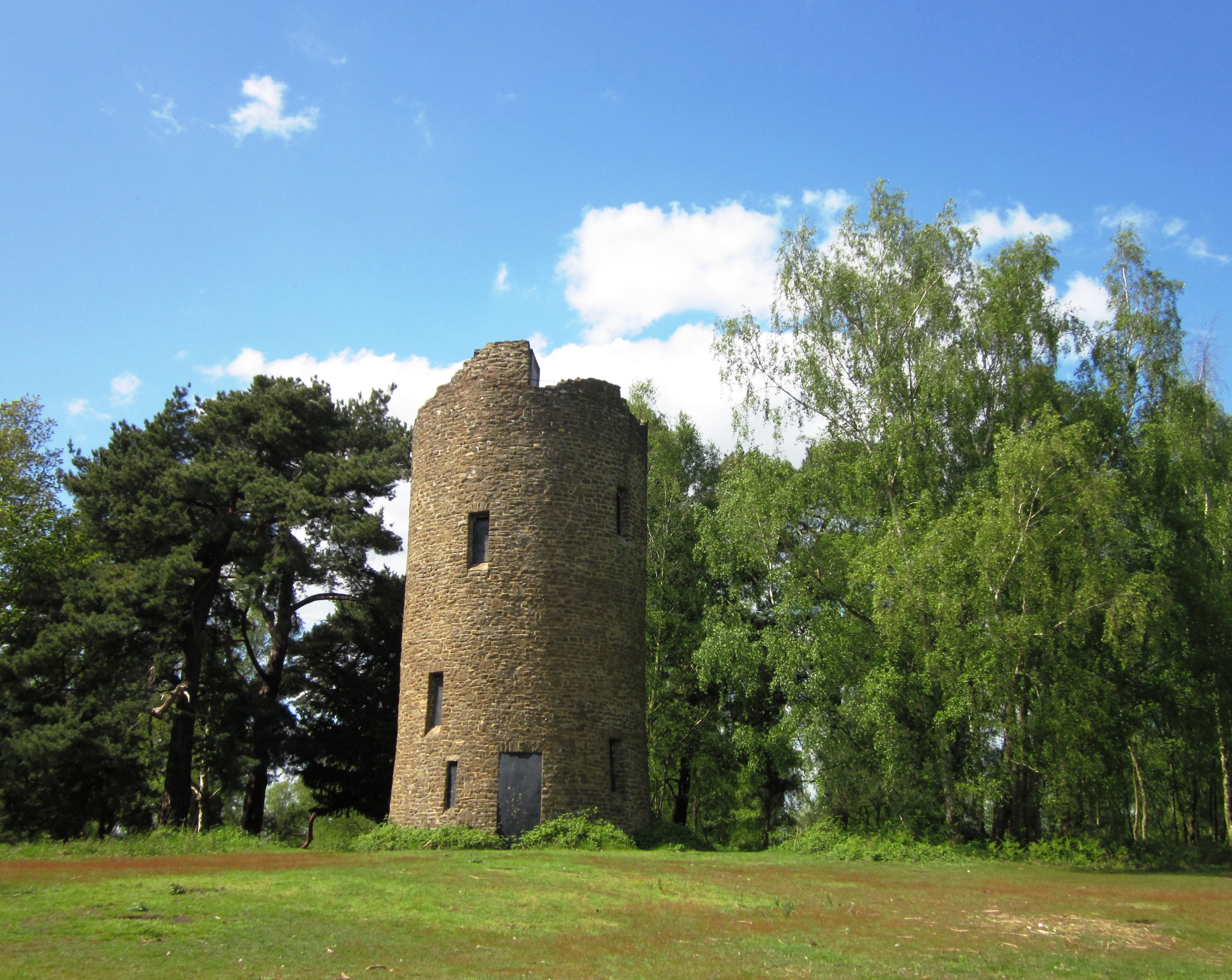
- Chinthurst Hill Tower
- Interactive map of Chinthurst Hill
- Type: Local Nature Reserve
- Location: Guildford, Surrey
- OS grid: TQ 012 459
- Area: 17.2 hectares (43 acres)
- Manager: Surrey Wildlife Trust

Chinthurst Hill is a 17.2-hectare (43-acre) Local Nature Reserve south of Guildford in Surrey. It is owned by Surrey County Council and managed by Surrey Wildlife Trust. Chinthurst Hill Tower is a Grade II Listed Building.

The hill has woodland and dry acid grassland. There are woodland flowering plants such as wood anemone, yellow archangel, wood forget-me-not, red campion, common figwort, butcher’s broom and lady’s smock.

There is access from Kings Road.
