= Bramber railway station =

Disused railway station in England

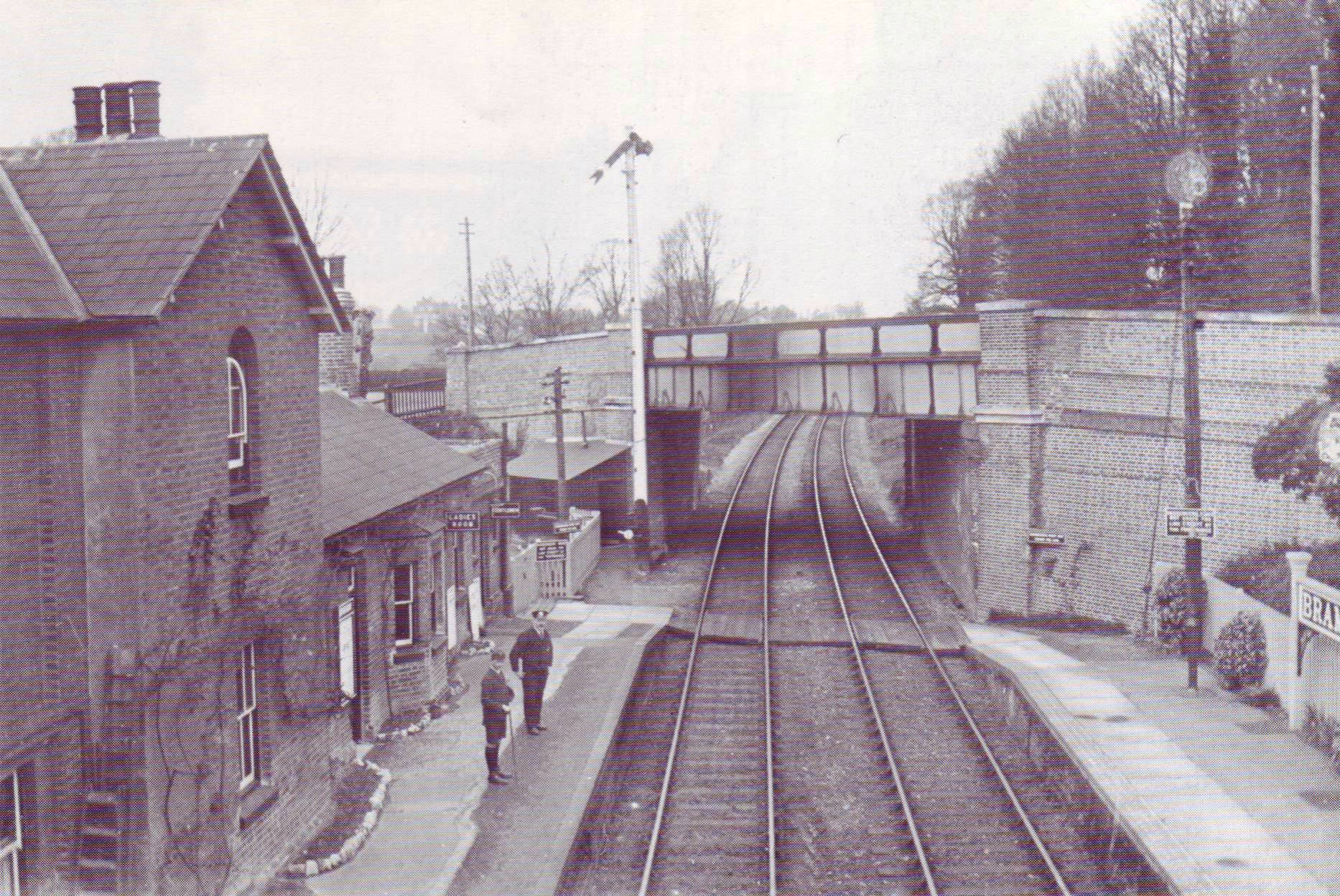

General information
- Location: Bramber, Horsham, West Sussex; England
- Coordinates: 50.88093°N 0.31549°W
- Grid reference: TQ186104
- Platforms: 2

Other information
- Status: Disused

History
- Pre-grouping: London, Brighton and South Coast Railway
- Post-grouping: Southern Railway; Southern Region of British Railways

Key dates
- 1 July 1861: Opened
- 7 March 1966: Closed
Location

Bramber railway station was a railway station in England on the Steyning Line which served the village of Bramber. The station was patronised by tourists visiting nearby Bramber Castle, Potter's Museum and the village. In order to accommodate the special excursion trains the station platforms were extra long.

The railway closed as a result of the Beeching Axe in 1966. Nothing remains of the station today, which now forms part of a traffic roundabout.

Preceding station	Disused railways	Following station
Steyning	British Rail; Southern Region; Steyning Line	Shoreham-by-sea

== Gallery ==
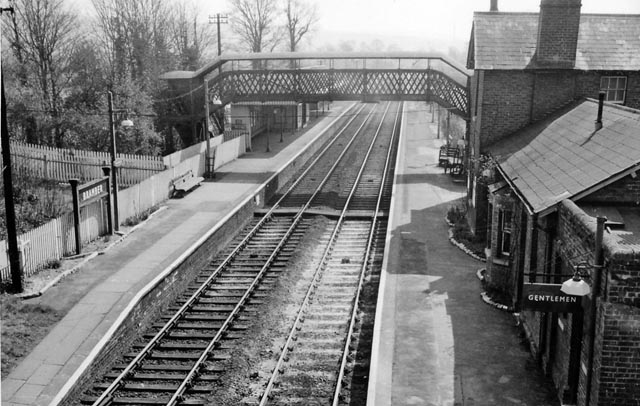
A view in 1964

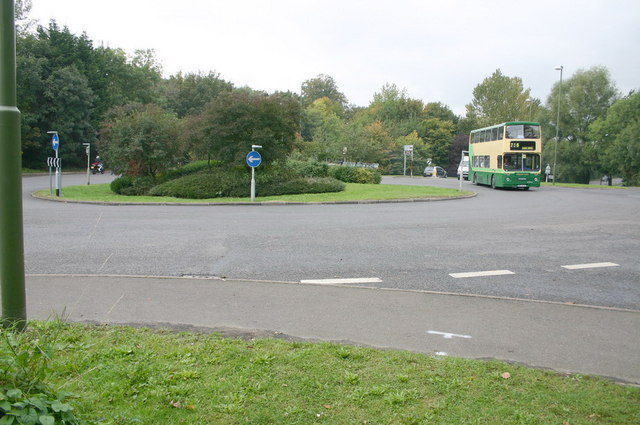
Former station site on Steyning Bypass

== See also ==
- List of closed railway stations in Britain
