= Adur Estuary =

Protected area in West Sussex, England

Coordinates: 50.836°N 0.286°W

- Site of Special Scientific Interest
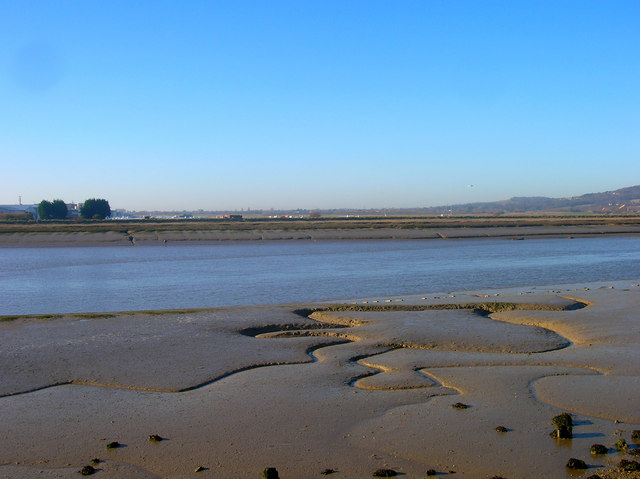
- Location of Adur Estuary.
- Area of search: West Sussex
- Grid reference: TQ 208 055
- Interest: Biological
- Area: 60.3 hectares (149 acres)
- Notification date: 1987
- Location map: Magic Map

Adur Estuary is a 62.2-hectare (154-acre) biological Site of Special Scientific Interest on the western outskirts of Shoreham-by-Sea in West Sussex. Part is a Royal Society for the Protection of Birds nature reserve.

The estuary has large areas of salt marsh. Sea purslane is dominant above the mean high water mark and glasswort below. There are also intertidal mudflats which are nationally important for ringed plovers and other wading birds include redshanks and dunlin.

There is no public access to the RSPB reserve.

== History ==
The Adur Estuary has been an active feature, influenced by the deposition of sediment by the river, the longshore drift of shingle and the efforts of humans to maintain a port. Originally the port was located at Old Shoreham which is now one point five kilometres (0.93 miles) off the current coast and the Adur could be navigated as far as Bramber. In the eleventh century, the river had silted so much that the port was moved one kilometre (0.62 miles) downstream to the modern town of Shoreham, then known as New Shoreham. When the coast was surveyed in 1587 in preparation for defence against the Spanish Armada the course of the river flowed one kilometre (0.62 miles) east from New Shoreham to enter the English Channel between New Shoreham and Kingston-by-Sea. To the west of the mouth there was a shingle beach which was one kilometre (0.62 miles) wide at New Shoreham and which tapered away as it approached Lancing.

By 1648, records indicate that there had been a noticeable extension of the spit at Shoreham of 1.4 kilometres (0.87 miles) and the total length of the spit was 2.4 kilometres (1.5 miles). A 1698 record shows that it had extended a further six hundred metres (660 yd) and that many bars had formed within the river. As Shoreham beach grew eastwards it thinned to less than five hundred metres (550 yd) by 1698 and the lagoons opposite New Shoreham had silted up and become marshland. A number of artificial cuts were made in the late 17th and 18th centuries but these all silted up. By 1757, the Adur entered the sea at Aldrington, 5.1 kilometres (3.2 miles) and in 1760 the decision was taken to create an artificial cut at Kingston to improve access to the port and upstream drainage upstream. The new cut resulted in increased tidal floes which overwhelmed the saltmarshes on the north bank. A map of 1778–1783 showed that there was a belt of marsh which was protected by the shingle bar to the east of the exit, then wider than the present bar. Deposition of sediment meant the entrance to the port continued to drift and in 1818 the original 1760 cut was re-excavated and groynes and breakwaters were built to protect it. In 1821 the cut was made a permanent opening by the building of walls while in 1860 the old channel east of Kingston was canalised to become a basin where water levels were controlled by locks. The estuary appears to have been stabilised from 1816, however, the mud and sand banks within the estuary have shifted. The western arm of the shingle bar has gained sufficient material for housing development to be permitted. The eastern arm has seen the amount of shingle slowly decrease and this has caused concern about the safety and stability of the former power station at Shoreham.

== Wildlife ==
The intertidal flats of the Adur Estuary and the saltmarsh are important for feeding and roosting birds. Eurasian teal and mallard are the commonest wildfowl species while waders include Northern lapwing, grey plover, common redshank, common snipe and ruddy turnstone. The estuary is most important as a wintering site for common ringed plover and the numbers here regularly attain a level representing 1% of the total British population of this species. A reedbed next to the estuary, on the northern side of the A27, holds breeding populations of common moorhen, Eurasian reed warbler and sedge warbler. The embankment close to the car park is home a large colony of viviparous lizard (Zootoca vivipara).
