= Steyning railway station =

Former railway station in England

Coordinates: 50.8895°N 0.3214°W

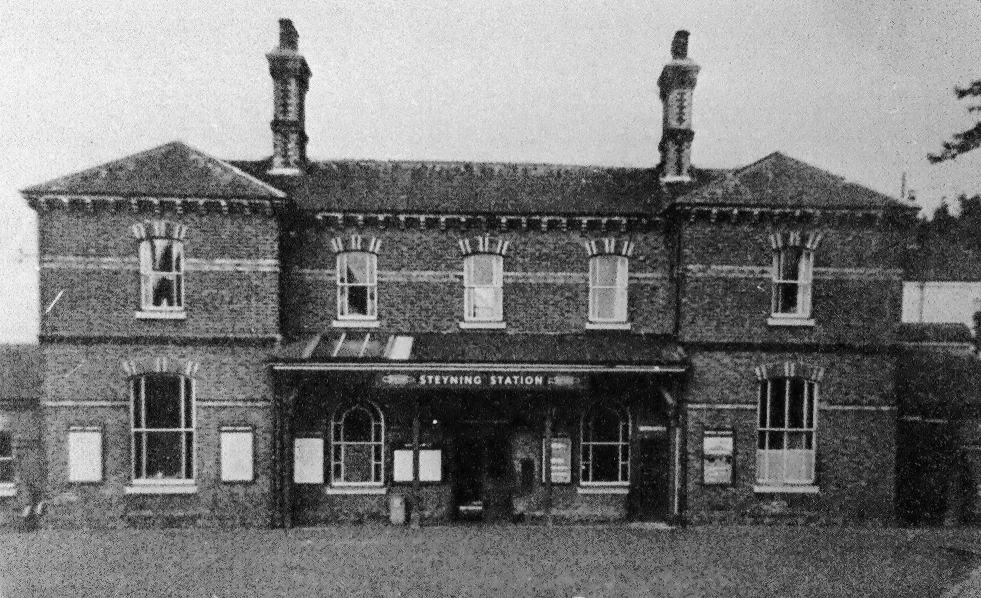

General information
- Location: Steyning, Horsham, West Sussex; England
- Grid reference: TQ182114
- Platforms: 2

Other information
- Status: Disused

History
- Pre-grouping: London, Brighton and South Coast Railway
- Post-grouping: Southern Railway; Southern Region of British Railways

Key dates
- 1 July 1861: Opened
- 7 March 1966: Closed
Location

Steyning railway station was a railway station on the Steyning Line which served the market town of Steyning in West Sussex.

== Station opening and development ==
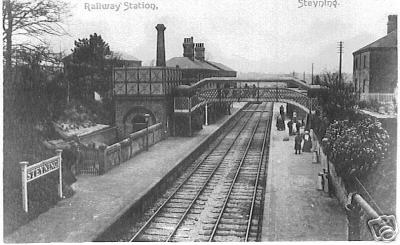
Steyning Railway Station, c. 1880

Steyning Station layout c. 1880

The arrival of the station accelerated residential development in the area and some houses were constructed by the railway contractor to the west of the station. Workshops constructed by the contractor survived as industrial units until their demolition after 1953. In addition to passengers, the station's main traffic was animals, notably horses, for the Wednesday cattle market in "Market Field".

The single-track line was doubled by 1879.

In 1912 the station master appointed by the LBSCR was Charles Holden, father of the past President of the Bluebell Railway Bernard Holden who also lived at the station-master's house.

== Closed ==
The station closed as a result of the Beeching Axe in 1966 and was demolished soon after closure. The site is now occupied by the new alignment of the A283 Steyning-by-pass. Only the old warehouse building (view building), long since converted into townhouses remains of the station today aside from the name "Station Road".

Preceding station	Disused railways	Following station
Henfield	British Rail; Southern Region; Steyning Line	Bramber

== See also ==
- List of closed railway stations in Britain
