= Southwater =

Village and parish in West Sussex, England

Coordinates: 51.02379°N 0.35256°W

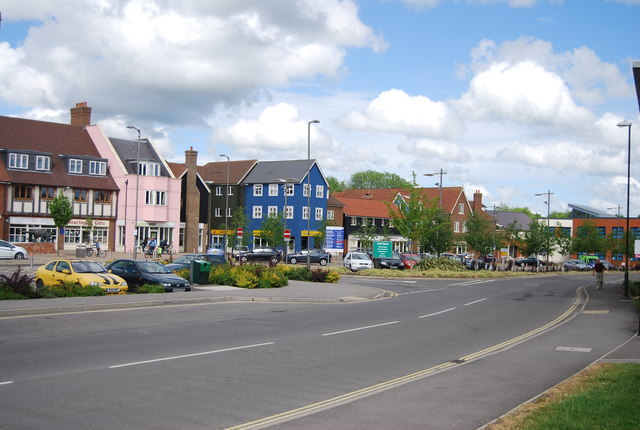
- Lintot Square

- Location within West Sussex
- Area: 5.40 sq mi (14.0 km^{2})
- Population: 10,025 2001 Census; 10,730 (2011 Census)
  - Density: 1,850/sq mi (716/km^{2})
- OS grid reference: TQ156262
  - London: 34 miles (55 km) NNE
- Civil parish: Southwater
- District: Horsham
- Shire county: West Sussex
- Region: South East
- Country: England
- Sovereign state: United Kingdom
- Post town: HORSHAM
- Postcode district: RH13
- Dialling code: 01403
- Police: Sussex
- Fire: West Sussex
- Ambulance: South East Coast
- UK Parliament: Horsham
- Website: www.southwater-village.co.uk/

Southwater is a large village and civil parish in the Horsham District of West Sussex, England, with a population of roughly 10,000. It is administered within Horsham District Council and West Sussex County Council.

== History ==
One of the oldest buildings in the parish is Great House Farmhouse, a listed building at Grade II* built in 1462 from a late medieval structure in the Tudor period just west of the town.

In the early 19th century Southwater was predominately a collection of large estates divided into leased farms. Whilst mixed agriculture provided a lucrative industry for centuries, much of the population of Southwater originated from the workforce of the brick industry and the arrival of the railway, which opened in 1866. At the peak of production, the Southwater brickworks manufactured 18 million bricks a year, and employed 100 men. It was reported that Southwater bricks were used in the building of Christ’s Hospital, Victoria Station, RAAF Woomera Range Complex, London sewers and many London air raid shelters in World War Two. Following the closure of the brickworks, there was a project implemented to transform the area into a country park, which is now a major family attraction in the district.

== Community ==
In 2006 the centre of Southwater Village was renewed at a cost of £25 million.

Southwater has three public houses: the Hen and Chicken; the Tipsy Fox; and the Lintot which opened soon after the building of Lintot Square – the name is a reference to Barnaby Bernard Lintot (1675–1736), an English publisher born in Southwater. The first recorded alehouse in the village opened in 1542.

== Southwater Country Park ==
The Country Park is located on land originally named Andrews Farm which dates back to mediaeval times. The farm was sold in 1890 and became the Southwater brickyard owned by CJ Mills. The site was taken over by Sussex Bricks and Estates Co. in 1907 who changed their name to Redlands Bricks Ltd in 1958. The railway yard in Southwater served the brickyard and was closed in 1966 as part of the Beeching cuts. The brickworks closed in 1981 after producing 1,000 million red engineering bricks from Southwater clay. The brickworks chimney was blown up by a lucky resident who won a fund raising draw.

In the 1920s the bones of a dinosaur (Iguanodon) were found at the brickyard, fossilised in the clay. To commemorate this find, the statue of an Iguanodon was created and is displayed in Southwater's Lintot Square. The sculpture is named 'Iggy'. To further celebrate Southwater's dinosaur history, a dinosaur themed children's park was created at the country park for families to enjoy. Other historic items have been found at the park dating back to 500 BC.

The country park was finally finished and ready for the public in 1985 and had nature trails, lots of paths, seating, a beach to paddle, a dipping pond and two beautiful lakes. Lennox Wood had been within the brickyard since the 1960s. A new lake named Cripplegate Lake was man made from the quarries that were used to subtract the clay needed to make the bricks. Cripplegate Lake is over 30 ft deep at its deepest point.

Southwater Country Park is a 70-acre site with three lakes and numerous access paths located close to the centre of the village. The Park contains a visitor centre with information displays, and also a café, a skate park, and a children's adventure playground, and Southwater Water Sports Centre with facilities for sailing and canoeing. The Country Park and the Southwater Area Community Centre both have direct access to the Downs Link footpath/cycleway.

Over the years the lakes have become home to an abundance of fish and many water fowl. Lennoxwood is a fishing lake which has pike, perch, tench, roach, chubb and carp up to 25 lb. Crucians and eels also live there. The park includes a beautiful wildlife area 'The Quarry', which is managed for nature conservation and supports wildlife such as lizards, kingfishers, nightingales, herons, buzzards, red kites, cormorants and various butterflies and dragonflies. There used to be a small pond used for pond dipping by groups of local schoolchildren. Great Crested Newts were found which are an endangered species. The endangered Bee orchid has also been found at the park.

A pair of breeding mute swans have lived on the park lakes for many years and they regularly travel between the lakes of the park. In 2021, the local authority erected a fence around the perimeter of the main lake which restricted the travel of the swans and led to an increased risk to the swans of dog attack when travelling between the lakes. This was especially dangerous for any cygnets travelling with the parent swans during spring and summer. A local resident, Amanda Botting, set up a petition to have the fence removed which gained 3,300 signatures. The petition was handed to the local authority, who recognised the concerns of the residents and installed a new Swan Gate in the fence to provide the swans easier access to and from the main lake in spring 2022.

== Church ==
Holy Innocents Anglican parish church dates from 1848–49 and is Grade II listed. The Church was consecrated by Ashurst Turner Gilbert, Bishop of Chichester, on 7 June 1850, and the ecclesiastical parish was formed from part of Horsham Parish in the north and part of Shipley Parish in the south.

== Sport ==
=== Cricket ===
Southwater Cricket Club was founded in 1890, although the first recorded game played in the village was a Southwater XI playing a Shipley XI in 1858. Between 1890 and 2018, Southwater CC played at a ground located next to the Village Hall, on land originally donated to the club by the Fletcher family. In 2019, the club moved to a new ground and clubhouse on Church Lane, opposite the Holy Innocents Church, Southwater.

The senior 1st XI competes in Division 5 West of the Sussex Cricket League, the 2nd XI in Division 7 West and 3rd XI in Division 11 West (North).

In 2019, the club won the Sussex Coaching Club of the Year Award.

=== Football ===
Southwater has two amateur football teams, Southwater FC and Southwater Royals FC.

Southwater FC were founded in 1958, and currently play at the Southwater Sports Club. The club, nicknamed The Swifts, currently play in the Southern Combination Football League.

Southwater Royals FC were founded in 1997, originally known as Royal United. The club are currently based at The Ghyll, Southwater.

=== Bowls ===
The Southwater Bowls Club were founded in 1990. The clubhouse is located next to The Ghyll, Southwater.

== Freedom of the Parish ==
The following people and military units have received the Freedom of the Parish of Southwater.

=== Individuals ===
- Nirmala "Nim" Shingadia: 20 March 2024.
- Ramesh Shingadia: 20 March 2024.
- Teresa Longdon: 20 March 2024.
- Nicholas "Nick" Longdon: 20 March 2024.
- Ann "Paddy" Smith: 20 March 2024.
- Geoffrey "Geoff" Cole: 20 March 2024.
