= Steyning Line =

Shoreham – Steyning – Horsham railway line

The Steyning Line was a railway branch line that connected the West Sussex market town of Horsham with the port of Shoreham-by-Sea, with connections to Brighton. It was built by the London, Brighton and South Coast Railway, and opened in 1861. It was 20 miles (32 km) in length. It followed the course of the River Adur for much of its extent and was alternatively known as the Adur Valley Line.

The line never developed as a through route, and it remained dependent on agriculture and local industry. At one time it had been hoped that through traffic via Guildford might develop, but apart from occasional passenger excursion journeys, this business did not materialise. The rural traffic based on agriculture declined and proved unsustainable, and the line closed under the Beeching axe on 7 March 1966.

== History ==
=== Early proposals ===
In the 1830s a number of proposals for railway connections between London and Brighton were put forward. Robert Stephenson was associated with the London and Southampton Railway, later to be renamed the London and South Western Railway (LSWR). He advanced a project to build from Wimbledon on the Southampton line to Brighton, making use of the Mole Gap, where the River Mole has made a passage through the North Downs near Dorking, and the Shoreham Gap near Shoreham, cutting through the South Downs. The route is very nearly a direct southward line, leading to Shoreham, six miles west of Brighton. At the time Shoreham was an important seaport.

=== L&BR authorised ===
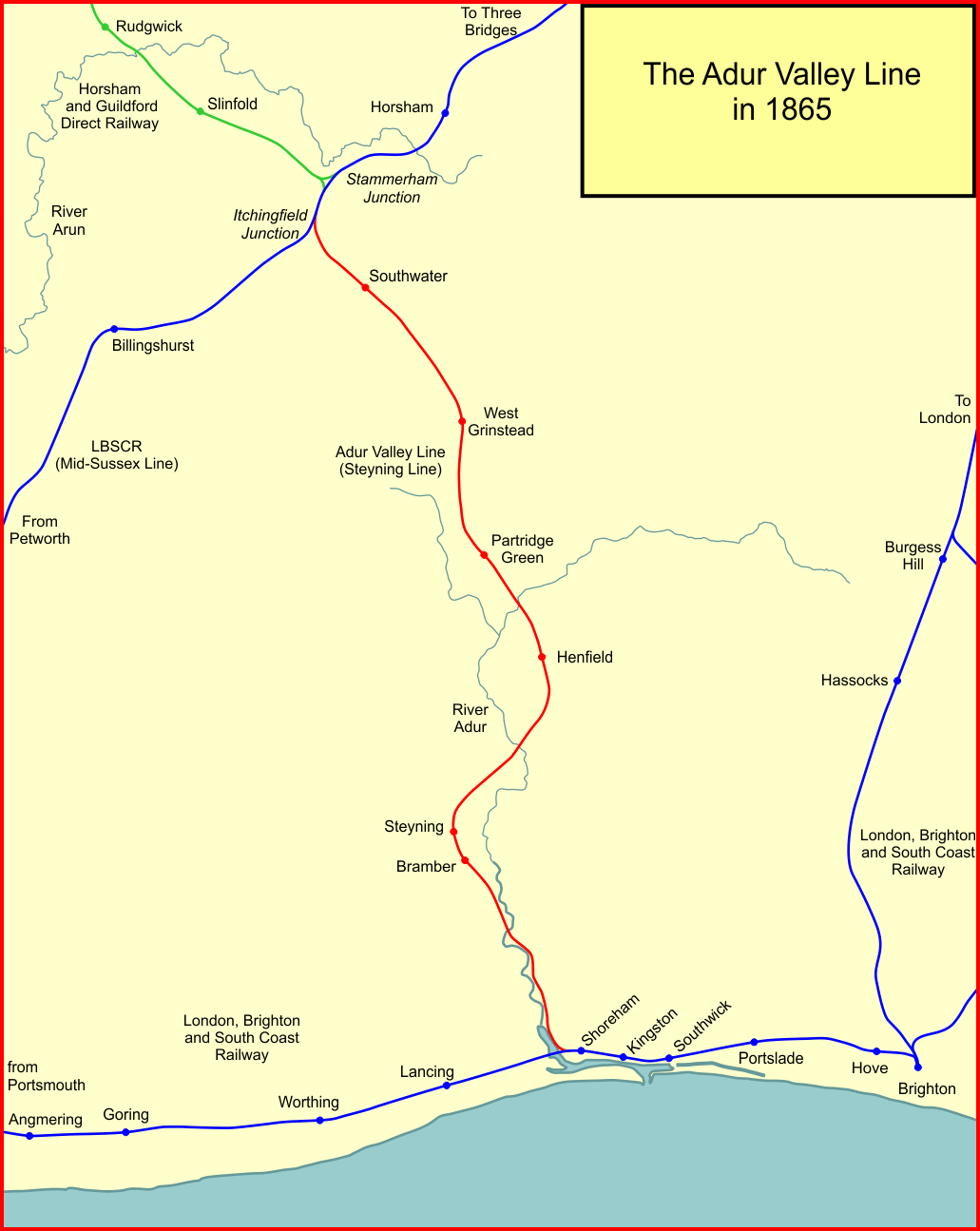
System map of the Adur Valley Railway line (Steyning Line)

This was a viable proposal, in opposition to the London and Brighton Railway's plans for a line from the London and Croydon Railway at Norwood, running through Redhill, Three Bridges and Haywards Heath. At the time Parliament was unwilling to authorise more than one main line in any particular part of the country, and in fact it was the London and Brighton Railway that was authorised to build its line. A branch from Brighton to Shoreham was included in the authorisation, and it was opened on 12 May 1840, in advance of the Brighton main line which followed on 21 September 1841. The Shoreham branch was progressively extended westwards, reaching Portsmouth in 1847.

Powers were obtained in an act of Parliament in 1846 for a branch from Shoreham to Steyning, but they were not exercised and the powers lapsed.

=== A Steyning line proposal revived and authorised ===
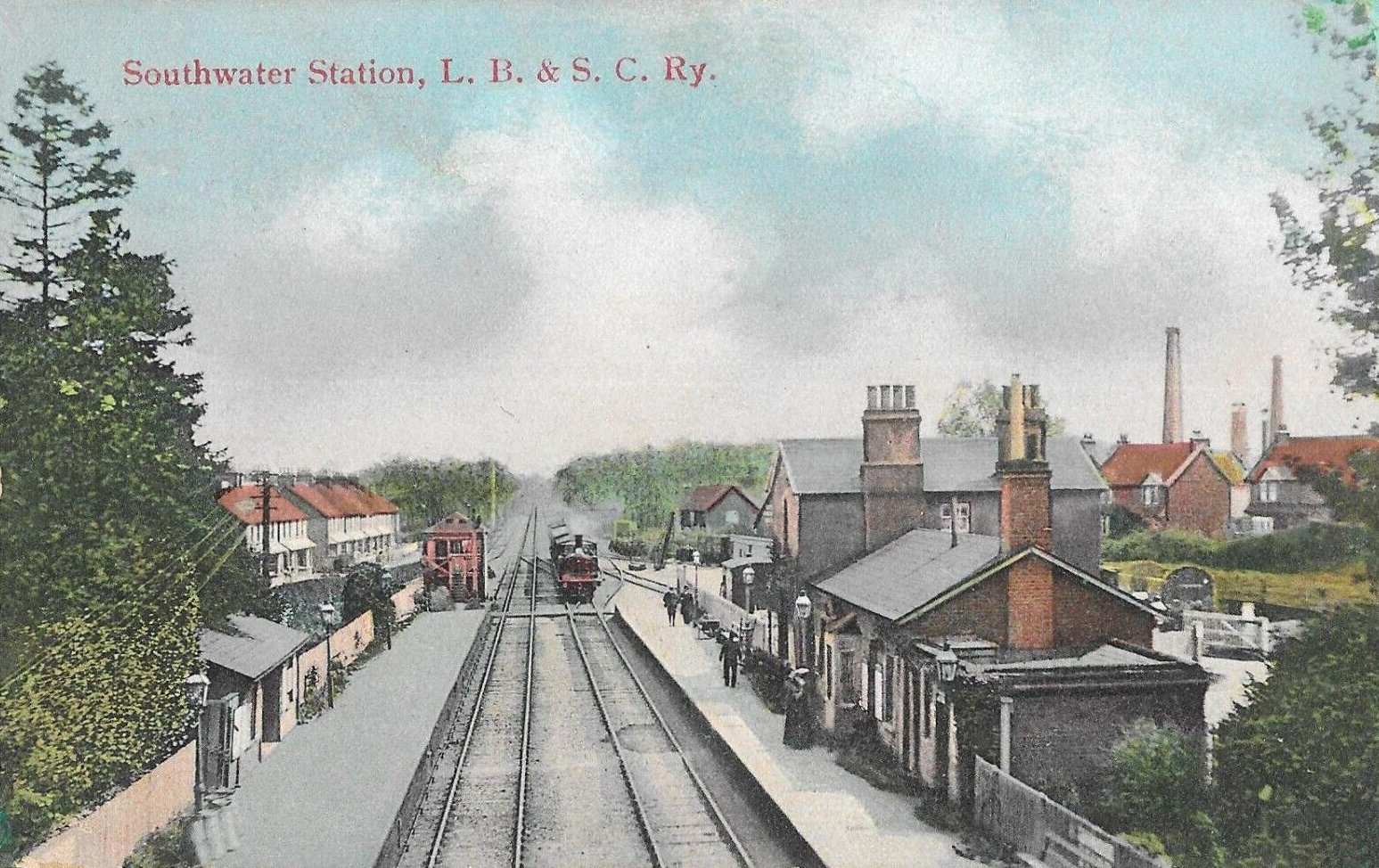
Southwater railway station

In 1857 Joseph Locke and Thomas Brassey promoted a railway from Shoreham Harbour to Horsham and Dorking. Dorking was on the route of a proposed new line from Leatherhead and other railways, actual or proposed, would connect to Wimbledon. Locke was associated with the LSWR, successor to the London and Southampton Railway, and this proposal was clearly a re-run of Stephenson's earlier plan, following much of the original course at the southern end. The LBS&CR was alarmed at this fresh incursion into territory it considered its own, and it quickly prepared a scheme to connect Shoreham to a junction at Barns Green, some distance south of Horsham. The junction was to be with the Mid-Sussex Railway line, authorised in 1857 but not yet built, from Horsham to Pulborough and Petworth. The Mid-Sussex Railway was an affiliate of the LBSCR.

The two schemes came before Parliament and it was the LBSCR which won out, gaining its authorising Act on 12 July 1858. Its estimated cost was £155,00. A deviation of the route was applied for in the following year, to make the junction with the Petworth line at Itchingfield, some distance nearer Horsham; this was authorised by Act of 1 August 1859. Buckman suggests that this was to more nearly reach the Horsham and Guildford Direct Railway, which had been authorised on 6 August 1860, but of course promoted earlier. The Guildford line was to provide a southward spur, enabling direct through running between Shoreham and Guildford.

When the line was nearing completion in 1861, the Board of Trade inspecting officer, Colonel Tyler, examined the line, testing in particular the strength of several bridges across the River Adur. In order to test the bridge at Beeding near the cement works (at the time described as lime kilns) four tender engines were positioned on it. The inspection was successful, and authorisation for the line to open to passenger operation was granted.

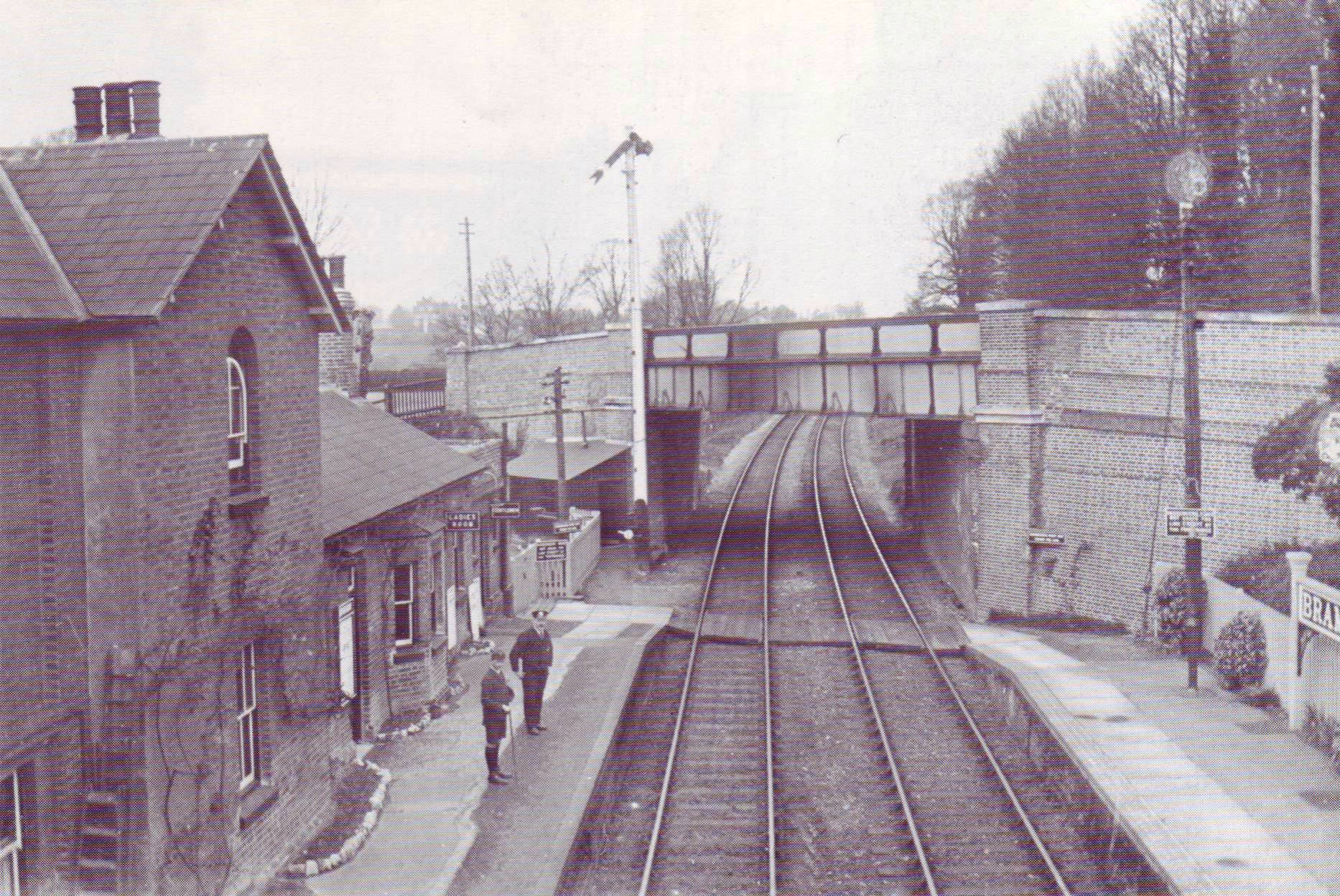
Bramber railway station

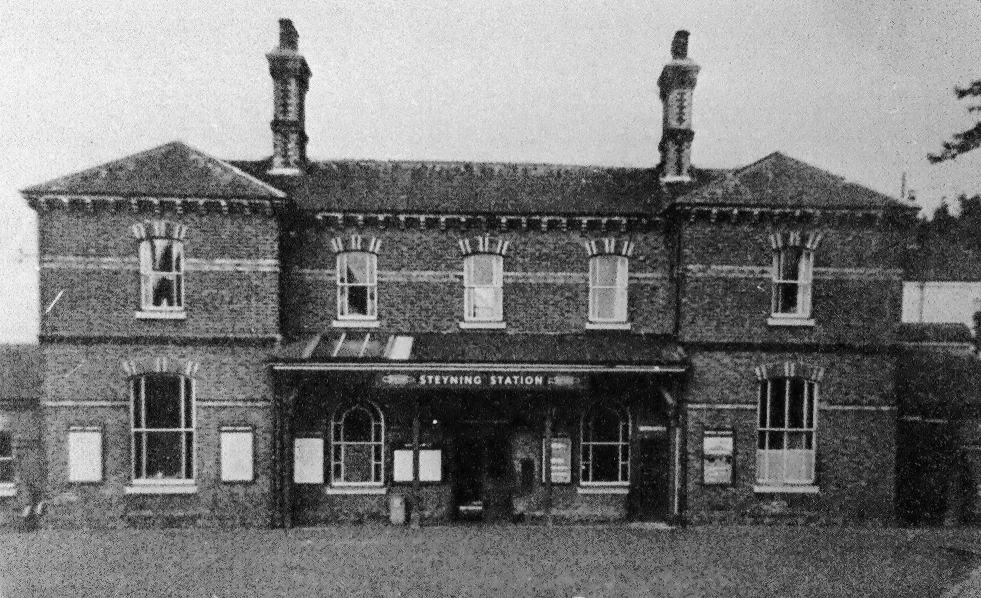
Steyning railway station

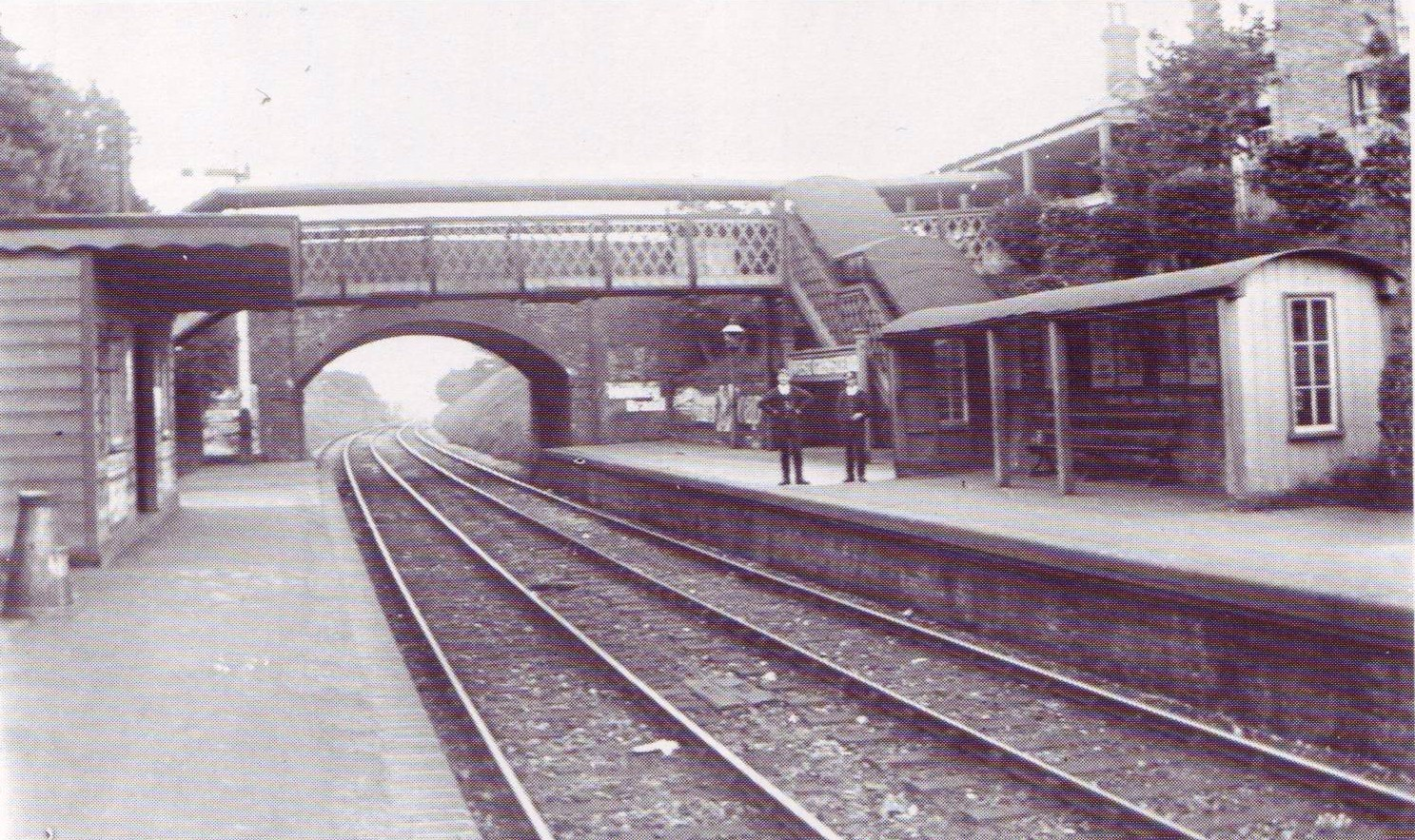
West Grinstead railway station

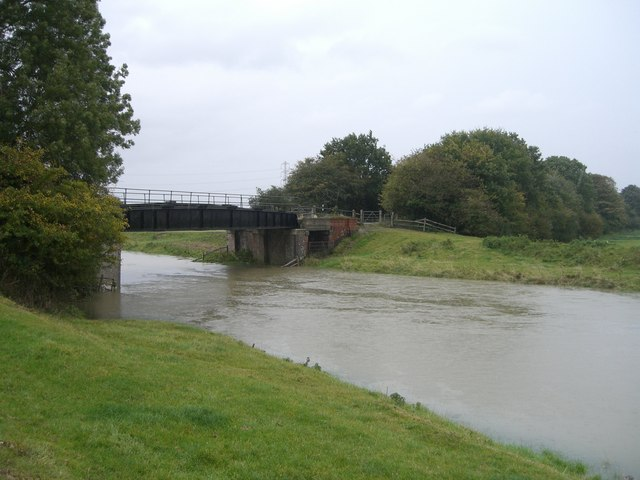
Stretham railway bridge over the River Adur near Henfield

== Opening and operation ==
The Petworth line opened on 15 October 1859 The Steyning line itself opened from Partridge Green to Shoreham Junction on 1 July 1861, and from Itchingfield Junction to Partridge Green on 16 September 1861.

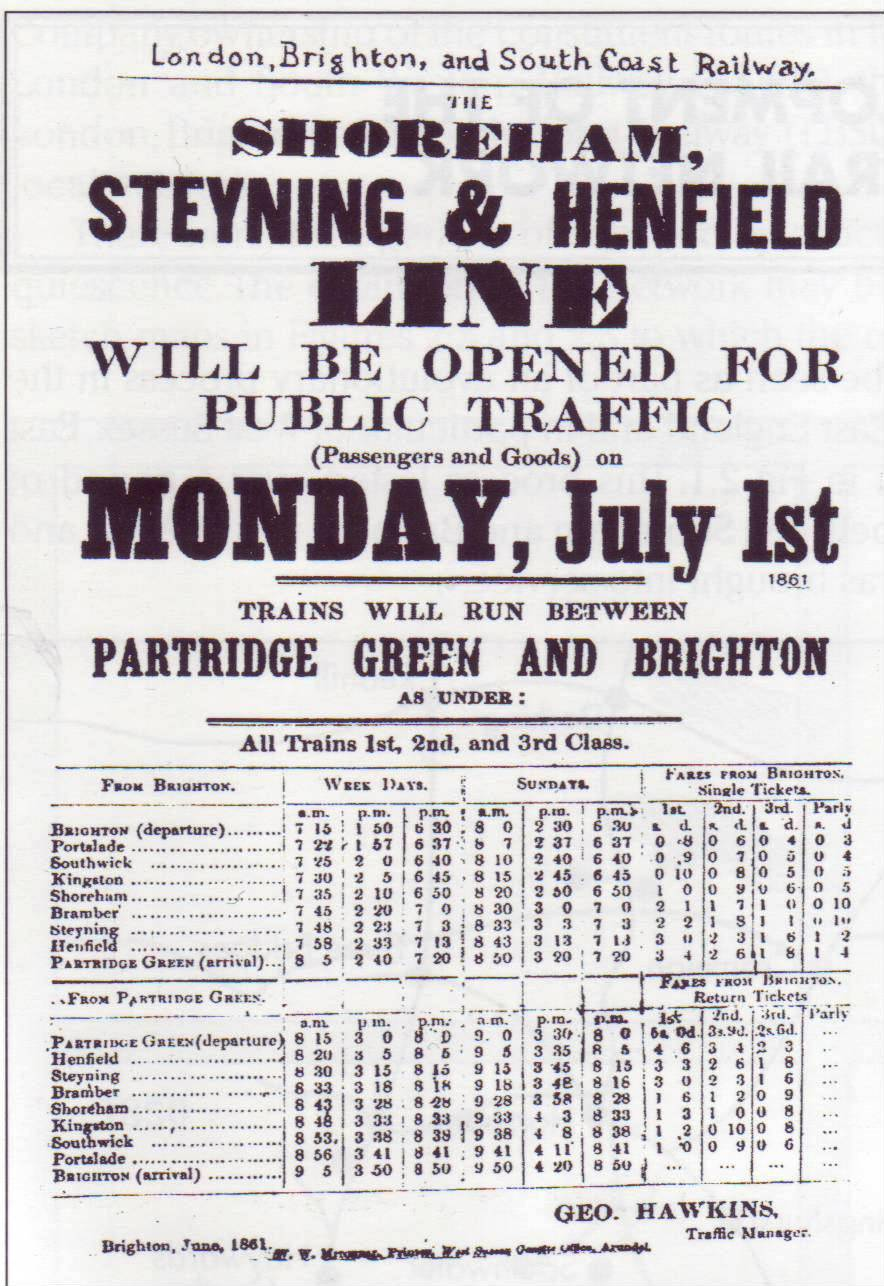
Announcement of the line's opening

After the opening of the second phase of the line on 16 September 1861, the daily passenger service between Brighton and Horsham consisted of four stopping trains and one express. The line between Itchingfield Junction and Shoreham was doubled during 1878–1879.

According to Course, in its latter years the line was served exclusively by local trains between Horsham and Brighton but it was laid out as a double-track main line, to form part of an alternative route between London and Brighton. Intermediate traffic was decidedly modest; Horsham to Brighton traffic was insufficient to support a railway... In May 1962, all the goods depots were closed and in March 1966 passenger trains ceased to run. Double track survived to the end but by 1964 all the signal boxes had been closed except Steyning. However, one important source of goods traffic was the Beeding Cement Works, now closed, which sent cement by train on a remaining spur of the railway to Shoreham until 1981."

It had been hoped that the Adur Valley Line and the Guildford Direct Line might together enable through traffic between the LBSCR at Shoreham and Brighton, and locations further north and west. However the LSWR controlled the railway network around Guildford, and frustrated the development of this traffic. The spur remained little used, and the LBSCR decided to close it from 1 August 1867; the Brighton company was concerned that the LSWR might take advantage of it to seek greater access to the south coast. The course of the spur may be seen in satellite imagery.

Traffic consisted mainly of agricultural produce, with goods being sent to the Brighton and Steyning markets and for auction. Steyning's weekly market relocated from the High Street to a location adjacent to the railway station, and cattle, sheep, poultry and other produce were transported to and from it for more than a century.

Some excursions began operating soon after the line to Partridge Green had been opened. One of the first was in July 1861 to Portsmouth; the fare was two shillings and there were 185 passengers on the service. Another excursion followed in August, to Crystal Palace via Hove.

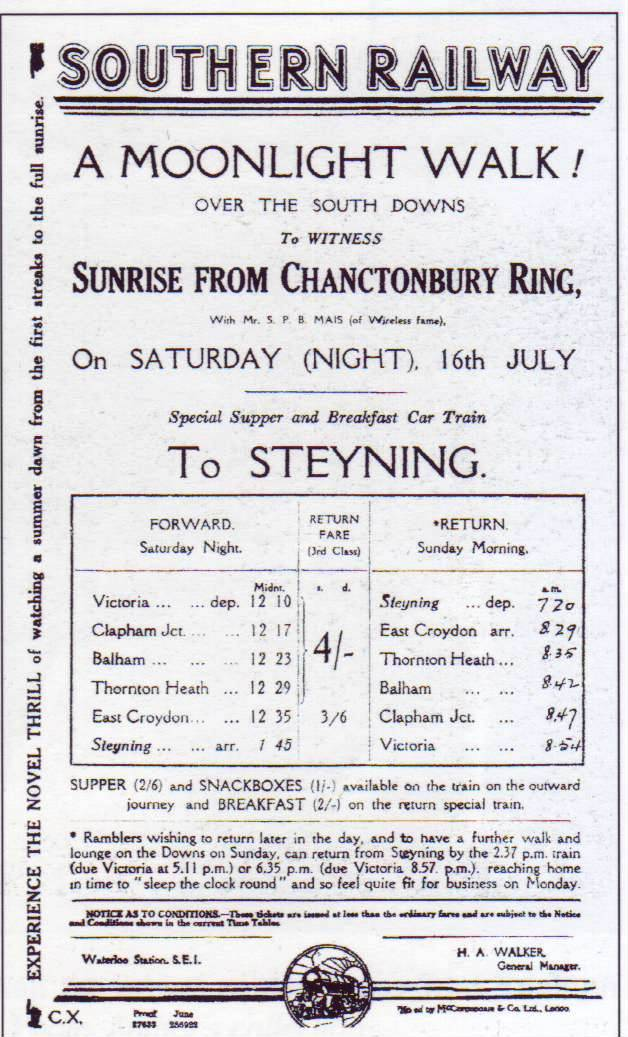
A summer excursion to the Chanctonbury Ring in the 1930s

== The twentieth century ==
From 1923 the line became part of the Southern Railway following the grouping of the railways under the Railways Act 1921. The unification of the former LBSCR and the LSWR eliminated any difficulty about through traffic via Guildford, and inward excursions to Brighton and Hove from places as far afield as Wolverhampton and Banbury, via Guildford and Horsham.

=== War years ===
The line was heavily used during the two world wars, carrying troops and munitions to the port of Newhaven. During the Second World War the line provided access to Martin Lodge at Henfield, which was used by the Royal Canadian Mounted Police; the 1st Canadian Infantry Division had a large encampment close to the airfield at Shoreham and on the playing fields of Lancing College.

=== Private siding traffic ===
The line served two important industrial enterprises - the cement factory at Beeding and the brickworks at Southwater. The cement works received gypsum from Robertsbridge and coal from the Kent Coalfield; there was a weekly block train to the British Portland Cement depot at Southampton via Shoreham and the Portsmouth main line. In 1960, for example, the cement works received 7,000 coal wagons, 2,300 gypsum wagons and 100 wagons of general stores; it sent out 7,670 cement wagons and 240 flint wagons. Traffic continued beyond the through line's closure until 1981; a single line from Shoreham was retained for the purpose.

== Decline and closure ==
The line's carryings declined as road transport became more effective and after 1945 losses mounted. The 1963 Beeching Report “The Reshaping of British Railways" listed the Steyning Line for closure. After 18 months of diesel working, passenger services were withdrawn from Monday 7 March 1966. The section from Shoreham-by-sea to Beeding Cement Works Sidings remained open for goods traffic until 1981. After closure most of the route was converted into a footpath/cycle route named "Downs Link"

== Locations ==
- Itchingfield Junction; junction on Mid-Sussex line;
- Southwater; opened 16 September 1861; closed 7 March 1966;
- West Grinstead; opened 16 September 1861; closed 7 March 1966;
- Partridge Green; opened 1 July 1861; closed 7 March 1966;
- Henfield; opened 1 July 1861; closed 7 March 1966;
- Steyning; opened 1 July 1861; closed 7 March 1966;
- Bramber; opened 1 July 1861; closed 7 March 1966;
- Shoreham; opened 12 May 1840 by London and Brighton Railway; renamed Shoreham Harbour 1 July 1906; renamed Shoreham-by-Sea 1 October 1906; still open.

== Downs Link path ==
The Downs Link is a footpath and bridleway connecting the North Downs Way and South Downs Way National Trails.
