= Blackheath =

Blackheath may refer to:

== Places ==
=== England ===
- Blackheath, London, England
  - Blackheath (Lewisham ward), an electoral ward for the Lewisham London Borough Council
  - Blackheath railway station
  - Hundred of Blackheath, Kent, an ancient hundred in the north west of the county of Kent, England
- Blackheath, Surrey, England
  - Hundred of Blackheath, Surrey
  - Blackheath SSSI, Surrey, a biological Site of Special Scientific Interest
- Blackheath, West Midlands, England

=== Other places ===
- Blackheath, New South Wales, Australia
- Black Heath, Virginia, USA, a late 18th and 19th century plantation and coal mine
- Blackheath, an industrial quarter of Cape Town, South Africa
- Blackheath, Gauteng, in Johannesburg, South Africa

== Education ==
- Blackheath College (disambiguation)
- Blackheath High School, Blackheath Village in London, England
- Blackheath Proprietary School, a former school in Greenwich, London, England

== Other uses ==
- Blackheath Rugby Club
- Blackheath Common, Waverley, England
- Blackheath Beds, a fossiliferous stratigraphic unit in England
- Plantman, a comic book character also called Blackheath
