= Shamley Green =

Village in Surrey, England

Coordinates: 51°11′03″N 0°31′29″W

- Village
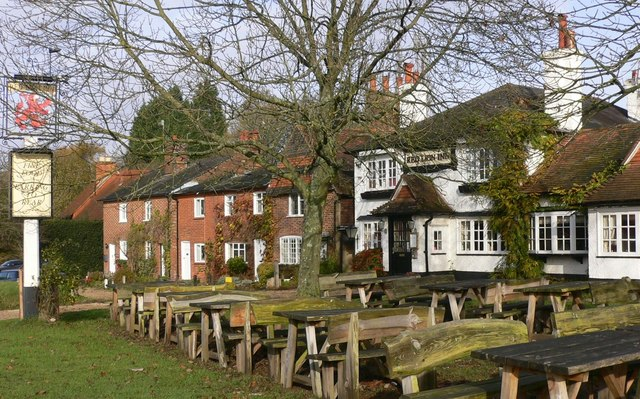
- Red Lion Inn at Shamley Green

- Location within Surrey
- Area: 0.8135 km^{2} (0.3141 sq mi)
- Population: 1,216 (2024 estimate)
  - Density: 1,495/km^{2} (3,870/sq mi)
- OS grid reference: TQ 032 438
- Civil parish: Wonersh
- District: Waverley
- Shire county: Surrey
- Region: South East
- Country: England
- Sovereign state: United Kingdom
- Post town: GODALMING
- Postcode district: GU5
- Dialling code: 01483
- Police: Surrey
- Fire: Surrey
- Ambulance: South East Coast
- UK Parliament: Godalming and Ash

Shamley Green is a village in the civil parish of Wonersh, in the Waverley district, in Surrey, England, set in part of the Surrey Hills National Landscape between Wonersh and Cranleigh. It is bordered on the east by Blackheath Common and in the west by Cranleigh Waters. Blackheath is separated by farmland and footpaths in Reelhall Hill and Woodhill. Two footpaths, traversing Lordshill Common, connect the middle of the village to The Wey South Path from Guildford to Cranleigh which follows the route of the former Cranleigh railway line. In 2024 it had an estimated population of 1216.

The parish church of Christ Church, was completed in 1864, initially as a daughter church of the Wonersh parish. The church is Grade II listed. The adjacent Old Vicarage, now a private home, was built for the first vicar, the Reverend Edgar Bowring.

Shamley Green has a number of social organisations including the village association, history society and a gardening club. The two pubs in the village are the Red Lion and the Bricklayers Arms. There is a general store and post office, and a primary school. Shamley Green Conservation Area contains 22 listed buildings with 10 others on the village outskirts. The green is a 5 ha (12-acre) area of common land, the majority of which is owned by the parish council. The area is predominantly open grassland and part of it is used as a cricket pitch. Shamley Green has a village hall designed by the Arts and Crafts architect, Charles Harrison Townsend. The hall was initially named the Arbuthnot Institute after Forster Fitzgerald Arbuthnot, the orientalist and translator whose widow, Elinore, paid for the construction as a memorial to her husband.

== Transport ==
The nearest railway stations are Shalford and Chilworth, both on the North Downs Line. Three bus routes, numbers 43, 53 and 63, connect the village to Guildford, Ewhurst, Cranleigh and Horsham. The main road through the village is the B2128 Guildford Road.

== In popular culture ==
In 1965, Ken Russell filmed scenes for his film Isadora Duncan, the Biggest Dancer in the World in the village, involving children from the former Longacre School.

In 2013, BBC Two featured the village in the Horizon episode The Secret Life of the Cat, stating that Shamley Green has the highest density feline population in the United Kingdom.

== Notable residents ==
- Max Adrian (1903–1973), the Irish actor, died in Shamley Green.
- T.S. Eliot (1888–1965) wrote the first draft of Little Gidding while convalescing there in 1941.
- Tony Hart (1925–2009), artist and TV presenter, lived in Shamley Green for more than 40 years.
- Alfred Hitchcock (1899–1980), lived at Winter's Grace in Shamley Green from 1928 to 1939.
- Laurier Lister (1907–1986), lived in Shamley Green until his death.
- John Selwyn Moll (1913–1942), banker, army officer and rugby player, is buried in the Commonwealth War Graves section of Christ Church, Shamley Green
- Charles Potter (1851–1895), English cricketer, died in Shamley Green.
- E.H. Shepard (1879–1976), Illustrator of Winnie-the-Pooh, lived in Shamley Green, and his children Graham and Mary were born there.
- Harry Secombe (1921–2001), lived in the village up till his death.
- Godfrey Thring (1823–1903), clergyman and hymn writer, died and was buried in Shamley Green.
- Andrew Timothy (1912–1990), priest and original Goon Show announcer, lived at Inglenook, Stonards Brow, Shamley Green.
