= Bramley, Surrey =

Village and civil parish in Surrey, England

Coordinates: 51.193°N 0.558°W

Bramley
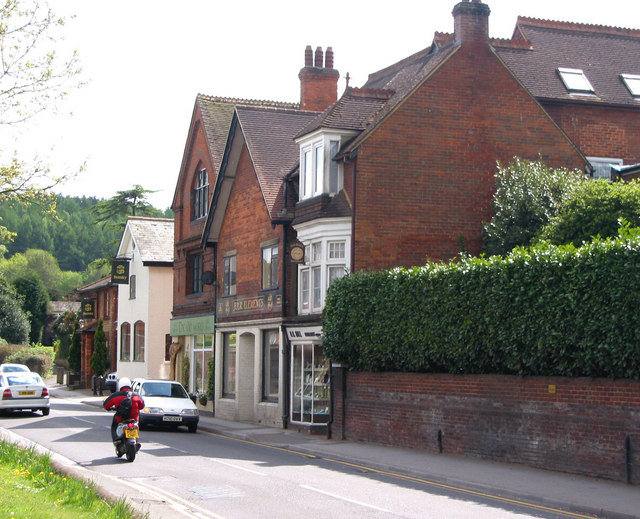
- High Street

- Location within Surrey
- Area: 18.87 km^{2} (7.29 sq mi)
- Population: 3,559 (Civil Parish 2011)
  - Density: 189/km^{2} (490/sq mi)
- OS grid reference: TQ0145
- Civil parish: Bramley
- District: Waverley
- Shire county: Surrey
- Region: South East
- Country: England
- Sovereign state: United Kingdom
- Post town: Guildford
- Postcode district: GU5
- Dialling code: 01483
- Police: Surrey
- Fire: Surrey
- Ambulance: South East Coast
- UK Parliament: Godalming and Ash

Bramley is a village and civil parish about three miles (5 km) south of Guildford in the Borough of Waverley in Surrey, south east England. Most of the parish is in the Surrey Hills National Landscape.

Within its boundaries there is evidence of Iron Age activity. Documents record a village at the end of the Anglo-Saxon era of the Kingdom of England and track its expansion and division during the Middle Ages. Much of the building was linear along the Horsham road: many such buildings have survived and the village has a substantial conservation area.

== History ==
=== Pre 1600 ===
The name Bramley is of Old English (Anglo-Saxon) origin; like "Bromley", one of its earlier forms, it means a clearing or lea in the broom). Birtley within the parish in the south and means a clearing in the birch.

The builders of the Iron Age fort at Hascombe probably included farmers from the Wintershall and Thorncombe Street areas of present-day Bramley, but there is no evidence of any Roman activity in the village.

The settlement appears in six large parcels in the Domesday Book of 1086 as Brolege and Bronlei. These were held by the Bishop of Bayeux (William the Conqueror's half-brother). Its Domesday assets were: 39½ hides; 3 churches, 5 mills worth £1 6s 0d, 39 ploughs, 20 acres (8.1 ha) of meadow, woodland worth 100 hogs. In 1086, Bramley was the largest and most valuable manor in Surrey by yearly income rendering a total of £83 14s 8d per year to its feudal overlords. The area comprised most of the western half of the Hundred of Blackheath, extending to the Sussex border and including Shalford, Wonersh, Hascombe and west Cranleigh.

The Anglo-Saxon settlers of neighbouring Wonersh – the name means a crooked field – and any Celts not displaced by them, may have been the people who developed the Linish, Bramley. This name means a flax-stubble field and in 1843, when the Tithe Assessment map was drawn, it covered the area now occupied by the Library, Blunden Court and Old Rectory Close. Flax was used to make linen but before spinning and weaving the stems were "retted"; soaking in running water, a procedure which could have used the stream which also powered the mills.

Cranleigh Waters flows through and drains the village. There were two mills, Bramley Mill and Snowdenham Mill, probably both here at the time of the Domesday survey, and Emply Lane (now a bridleway) led to the second of these mills from the higher land around Wintershall.

Coronation Oak green today is all that remains of the original village green at the centre of the village. It was once the crossroads where Linersh Lane, the road from Wonersh, met Deep Lane, the original route from Wintershall, and the first Mill Lane (moved in the 1820s), which started from the north side of the house now called 'Saddlers', which was previously known as 'Corners' or 'Old Corners'. There is a reference to a moated manor house near the village green, which would probably have dated from the 14th century; it survived to the early 19th century.

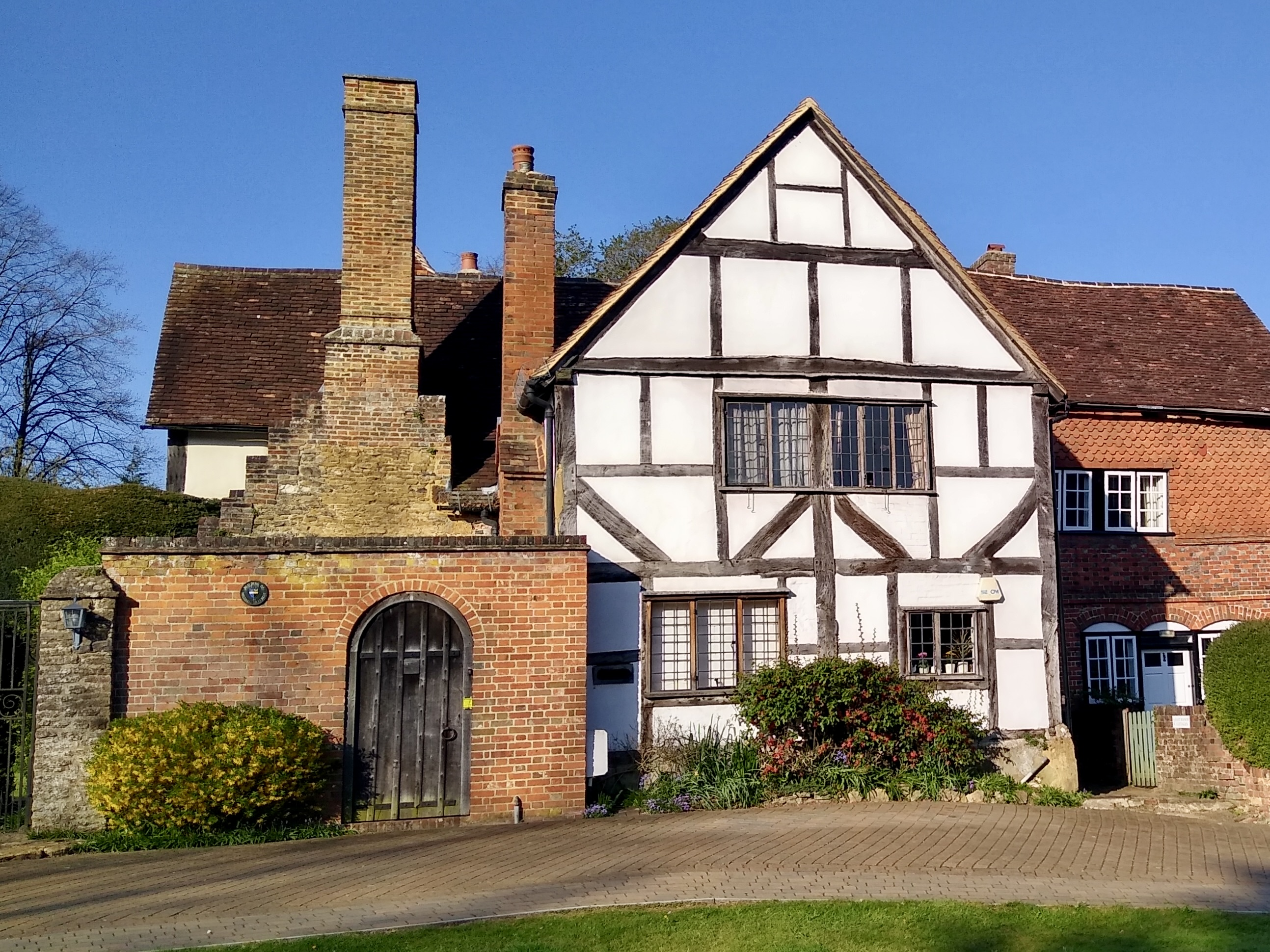
East Manor

By the mid-16th century there were 63 houses in what was called Bramley township, 22 of them within half a mile of the church. Two of the grandest houses in the village, of Tudor architecture, remain: East Manor (which faces the rebuilt manor house) and East Water House.

=== Holy Trinity Church ===
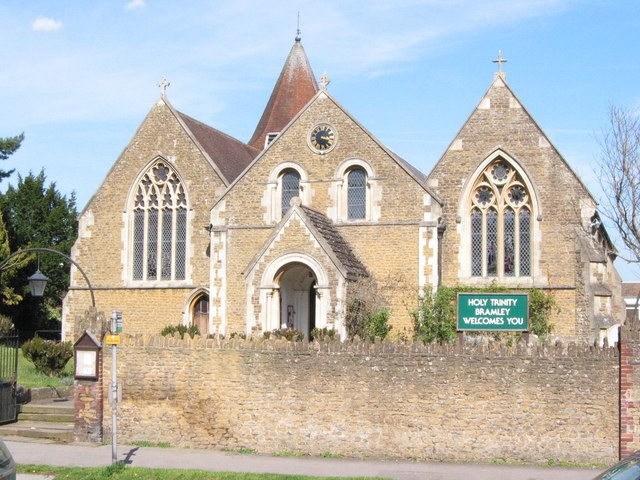
Holy Trinity Church

Bramley Church, dedicated to the Holy Trinity, dates from the 12th century with further additions in the 13th century. The tower and chancel date from the early 13th century with the south transept (now part of the south aisle) added later in the century.

Boundary walls were built and the burial ground was licensed for the first time in 1676. Holy Trinity was a daughter church of Shalford; Bramley only became a separate ecclesiastical parish in 1847.

=== Post 1600 ===
The village was growing in the 17th century; many of the houses on the west side of the High Street date from this period. Bramley Manor, opposite East Manor and originally the farm for Bramley Manor, was built in the middle of the century.

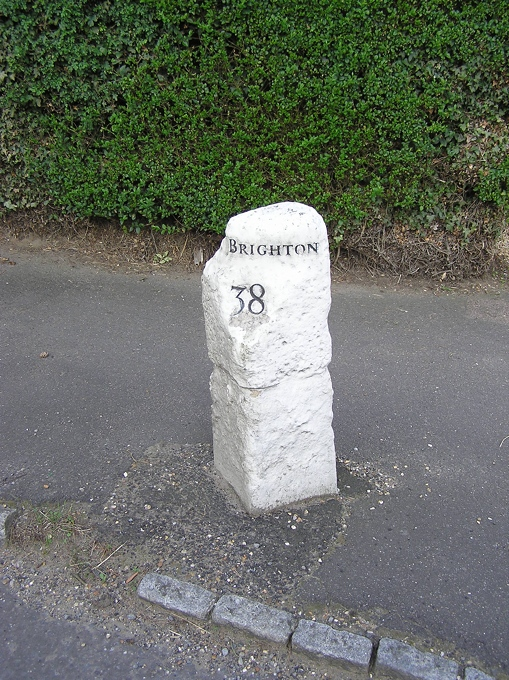
The milestone on the A281, Birtley Road

The 18th century brought more changes with the road through the village becoming part of the turnpike road from Guildford to Arundel, following an Act of Parliament of 1757; there is still a milestone in Birtley Road. A bridge and causeway were built on the road to Wonersh in the 1770s; the river was then diverted from its original course close to the bottom of Wonersh Hollow into a new straight course to align with the new bridge.

A house The Nunnery was purchased for the poor of the parish in 1735. This was at the far end of the Bramley millpond; it was sold a century later when the poor had to go to Hambledon Workhouse, in the early part of which century the Jolly Farmer public house was established.

The Napoleonic Wars brought concerns for shipping in the English Channel and plans to create an inland waterway between London and Portsmouth led to the building of a canal to connect Guildford to West Sussex and the now traditional port of Littlehampton. This finally opened in 1816. James Stanton was appointed Superintendent of the canal in 1819; by the time of his death in 1857 he had five barges of his own, but by now use of the canal was declining and it finally closed in 1871. Stanton's cottage on the wharf still survives. In 1825 the Earl of Egremont, a great supporter of the canal, had purchased a property in Bramley on the site of the present Park Drive which was soon demolished. He diverted some of the water from the millpond to the canal in an attempt to improve the canal's water supply; this had a lasting effect as the watercourse would define the boundary between the later school and cemetery. The Earl redirected the lane to the mill, roughly to the present Park Drive, and his nephew built Bramley House, now almost completely demolished. This house was later leased by Captain Jekyll and was the childhood home of Gertrude Jekyll. After the Jekyll family had left in 1868, the house was considerably extended and the lane to the mill now became a driveway to the house with a third, Mill Lane (the present one), put through in 1871.

Development in the village was also influenced by Mrs Charlotte Sutherland, who leased Church House in 1848. She largely financed the building of the north aisle of the Church in 1851, the new Vicarage (now demolished and replaced by Old Rectory Close), the Village School, the cemetery and its chapel (also demolished); her brother, Richard Charles Hussey, was the architect for all these developments.

Various railway companies had built lines in the vicinity and there were stations at Guildford in 1845, and Shalford and Godalming in 1849. In 1865, the Cranleigh Line linking Guildford with Horsham opened, and Bramley & Wonersh station (initially known as "Bramley") was the last stop on the line before Guildford. This was perhaps the main reason for the increase in population that followed, and there were housing developments including Station Road, Birtley Road and Eastwood Road; the south aisle, incorporating the south transept, was added to the church in 1875. There were several shops in the village by the 1850s but at the end of the century William Lawn Head re-fronted several of the houses on the west side of the High Street to provide Head's Stores. The Stores have since been split into various premises but Head's elegant shop-fronts remain.

The oldest existing school in the village, now called Bramley Infants School (previously Bramley C of E Primary School), was established in 1850 and at that time consisted of only two classrooms and a clock tower. Two more classrooms were added in 1874 and a further classroom and hall were built in 1894. Architecturally, its clock tower has been well maintained. An extension in 1957 provided indoor toilets and office accommodation. In about 2007 the school was entirely refurbished out of doors and decorated throughout indoors. Originally the school catered for four- to fourteen-year-olds but in 1973 it became a First School and caters for girls and boys from four to seven years old.

St Catherine's School was established in 1885, and has grown to have a significant physical presence in the village. The chapel, designed by C. Hodgson Fowler, was dedicated on 6 March 1894. Two stained-glass windows, designed by Charles Eamer Kempe, were installed in the chapel in 1902 in memory of Queen Victoria.

By the end of the 19th century the local government of the village changed with the establishment of a Parish Council in 1894. This met, as it still does, in the Village Hall whose Victorian exterior and modern additions conceal a barn with timbers dating back to c. 1400.

The gardener Gertrude Jekyll retained an interest in the area, and her friend, leading Arts and Crafts movement architect Edwin Lutyens designed Millmead House in Snowdenham Lane as a speculative development for her in 1904; she designed the garden. This has coursed and part snecked Bargate sandstone/red brick quoins and dressings and is Grade II listed. Grange Cottages were also built at the beginning of the century as staff cottages for Bramley Grange.

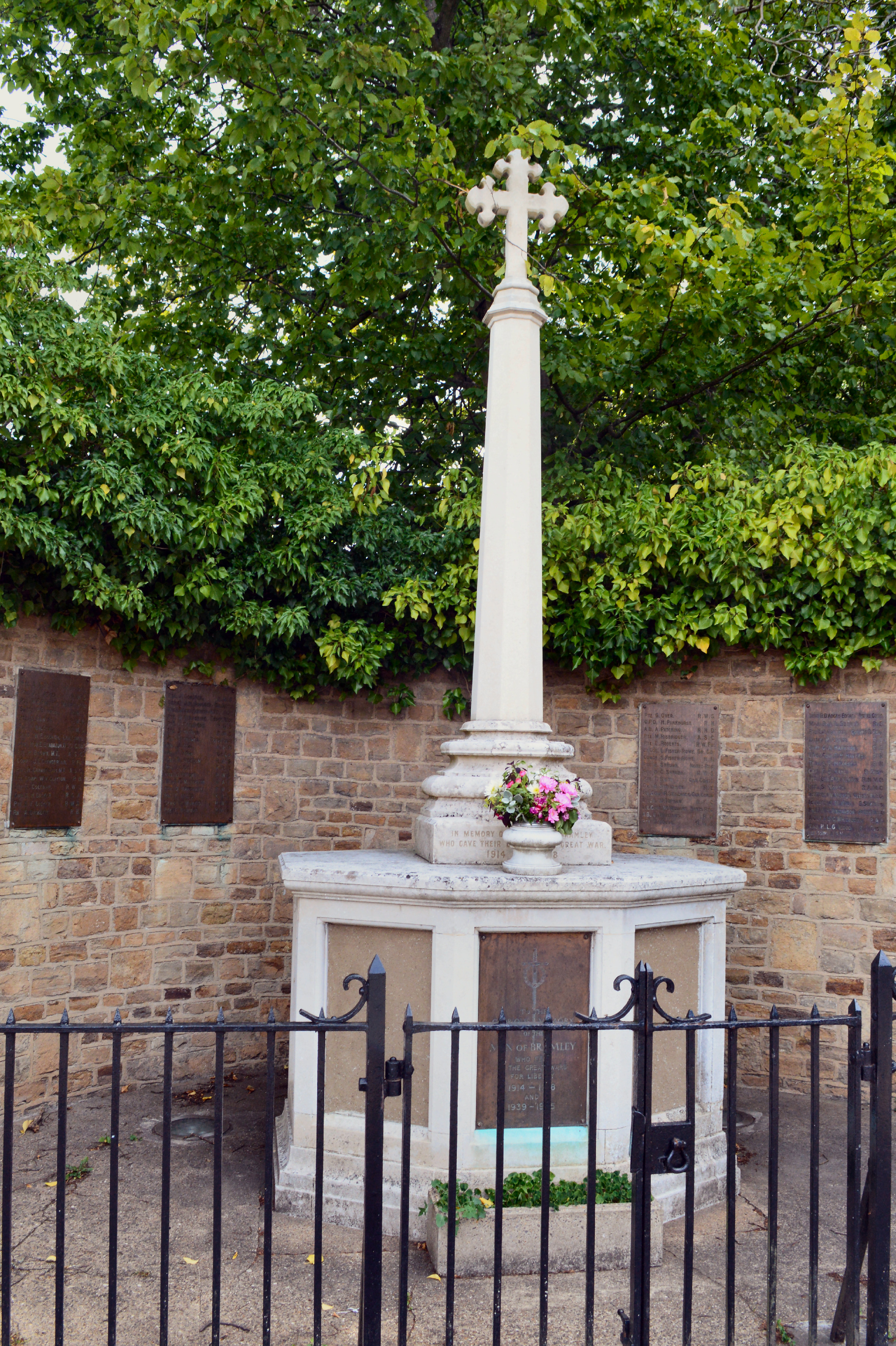
Bramley War Memorial

During World War I Thorncombe Park was used as a hospital. In 1921 the war memorial at the crossroads was built, designed by architect and local resident Frederick Hodgson.

In 1887 Bramley Grange was built on the site of the earlier White House for Colonel Webster (who later developed Bramley Golf course). After World War I it was converted to a popular hotel and remained a hotel until burnt down in 1996. Between the wars there was more housing development, including the start of Linersh Wood.

In the years since the Second World War, there has been considerable development in the centre of the village, much of it on the east side, including shops, Windrush Close, the Catholic Church, the public library, Blunden Court and Old Rectory Close. On the opposite side houses were built in Mill Lane and Home Park Close was built on the old kitchen garden of Bramley House, which had once contained "a long range of greenhouses and an abundance of peaches, nectarines, plums, cherries and pears".

As one of the Beeching closures the Cranleigh line, including Bramley & Wonersh station, closed in 1965 after serving the village for almost a century. The Bramley Grange Hotel was heavily damaged in a fire in 1996. In 2004, the building was replaced by retirement apartments constructed in a similar style.

== Amenities and events ==
=== Schools ===
- Bramley C of E Primary School, also supported by the County Council, established in 1850.
- St Catherine's School, an independent girls' school established in 1885

=== Businesses ===
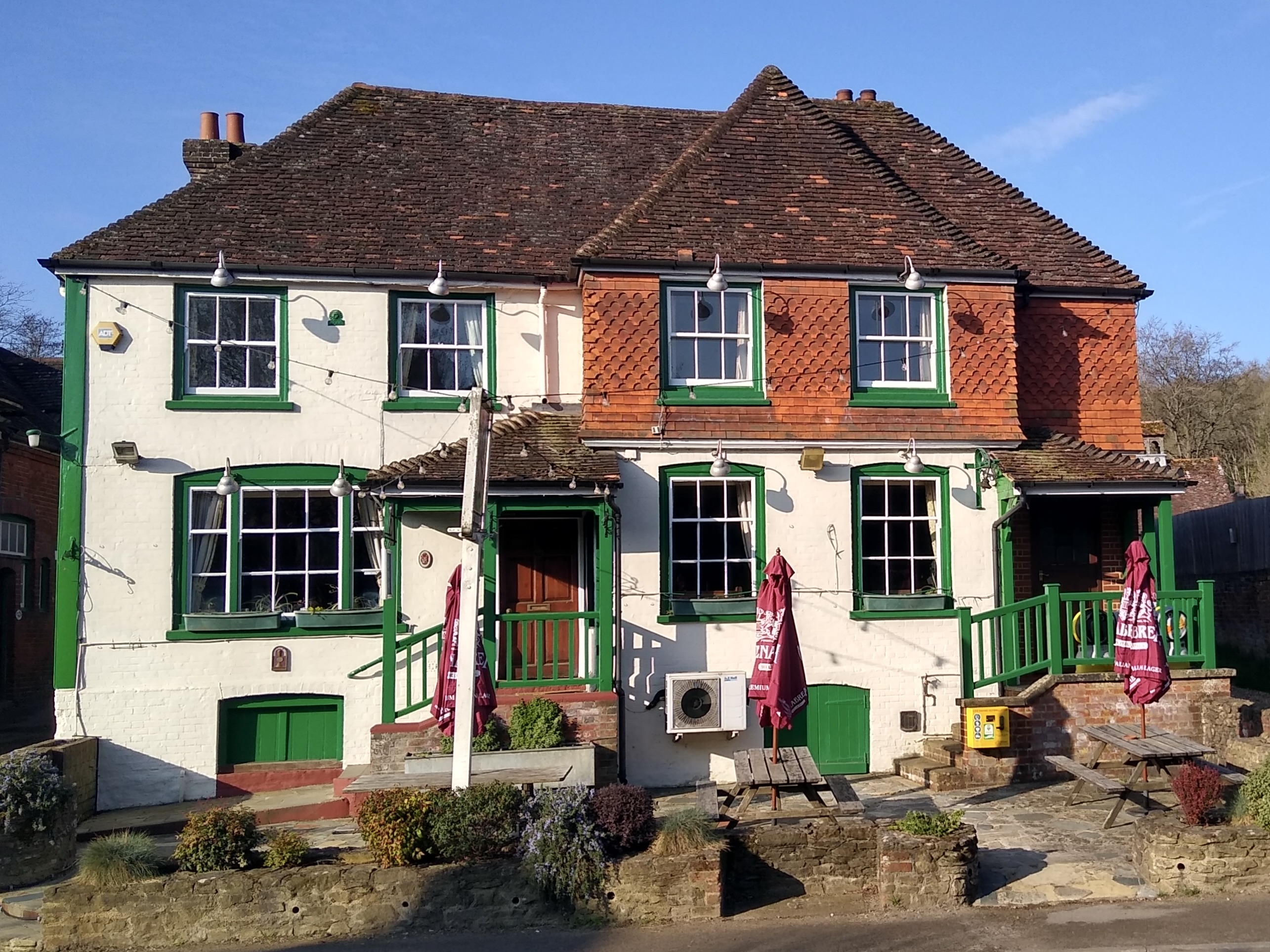
The Jolly Farmer pub

Amenities include a post office, small supermarket, butchers, Chinese takeaway, Indian restaurant, antiques shop, art gallery, café, fish and chip shop, two hairdressers and a classic car showroom. There are also two public houses: the "Jolly Farmer" and the "Wheatsheaf".

=== Sports ===
There is a golf course and cricket green. This was the first known cricket ground to host an all women's cricket match in 1745 on Gosden Common where Bramley Cricket Club play today.

=== Churches ===
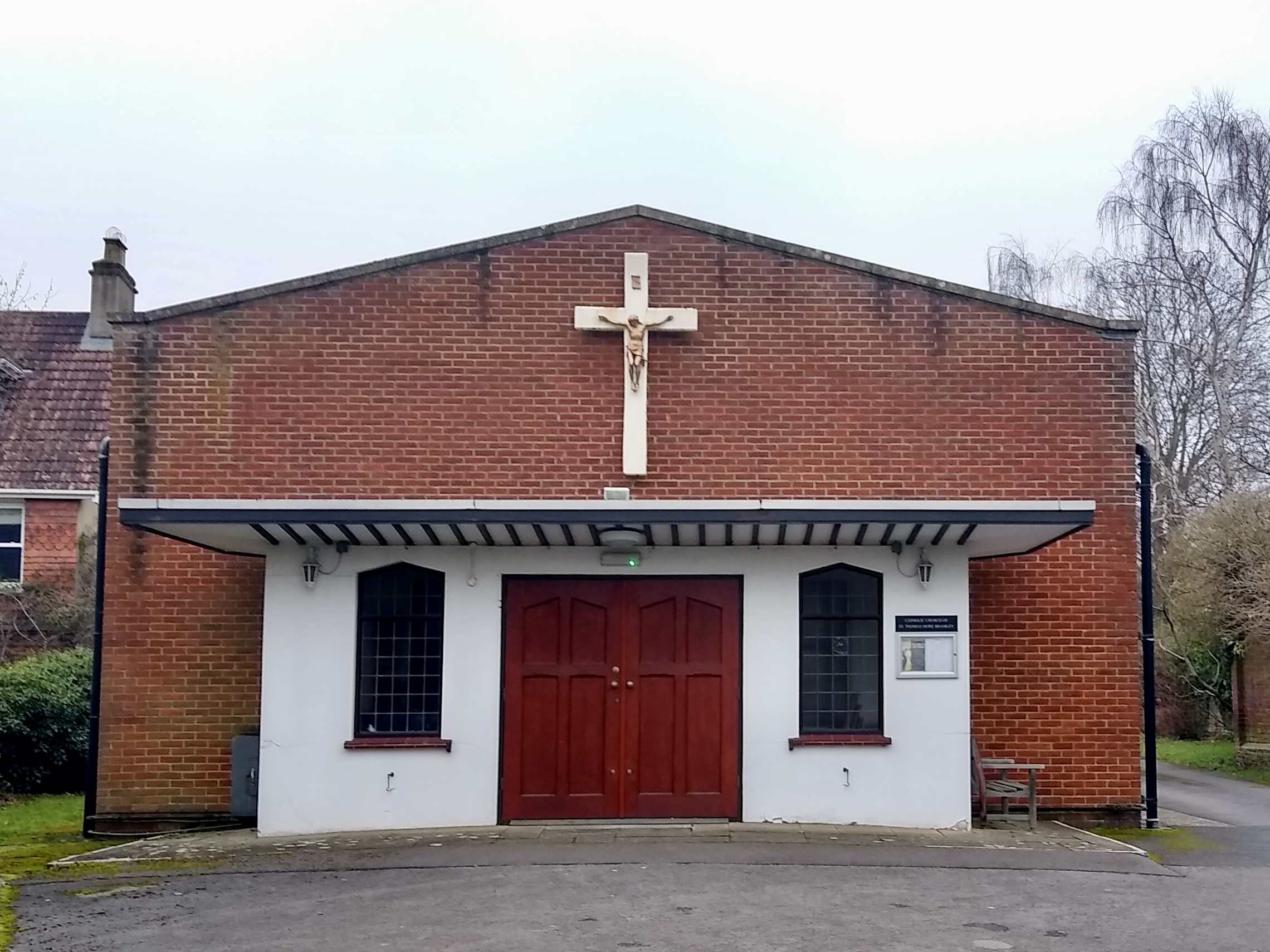
Catholic Church of St Thomas More, High Street

There are two churches, one Roman Catholic, and the Anglican Holy Trinity Church. The Catholic Church of St Thomas More was designed by Richard C. Hosford and opened in April 1959.

=== Events and other amenities ===
Bramley Library, in the High Street, was made available to borrowers in November 1965, although the official opening ceremony did not take place until January the following year.

Annual Christian drama productions take place at the Wintershall estate, including a Christmas nativity play, established in 1990.

The village fête is held in May each year on Gosden Common, and the village Bonfire in November is a huge local event.

The village has been twinned with Rhens, in Germany since 1986.

== Localities ==
Four named localities cover the south of Bramley: Birtley Green, Thorncombe Street, Grafham and Smithbrook.

=== Birtley Green ===
Birtley Green Hamlet, separated by a 100 metres (330 ft) green buffer to its north, consists of Birtley Green Nursing Home, three listed buildings that form Birtley Courtyard and ten houses, three of which are listed buildings. The A281 road passes through the hamlet after passing through Bramley. Birtley Brook is a small linear woodland brook to its south that flows into the Cranleigh Waters, a tributary of the River Wey.

Charles Smith purchased a site from Elizabeth Street of Birtley House in 1848. His son William established a brewery in Bramley High Street before 1865. This continued in operation until 1923, when the brewery chimney was demolished. His other son Richard established a foundry in Bramley High Street which lasted until the early 1960s and is now the site of Bramley Motors.

=== Thorncombe Street ===
This hamlet is 1.5 miles (2.4 km) SSW of Bramley village centre and has 29 houses and four listed buildings.

=== Grafham ===
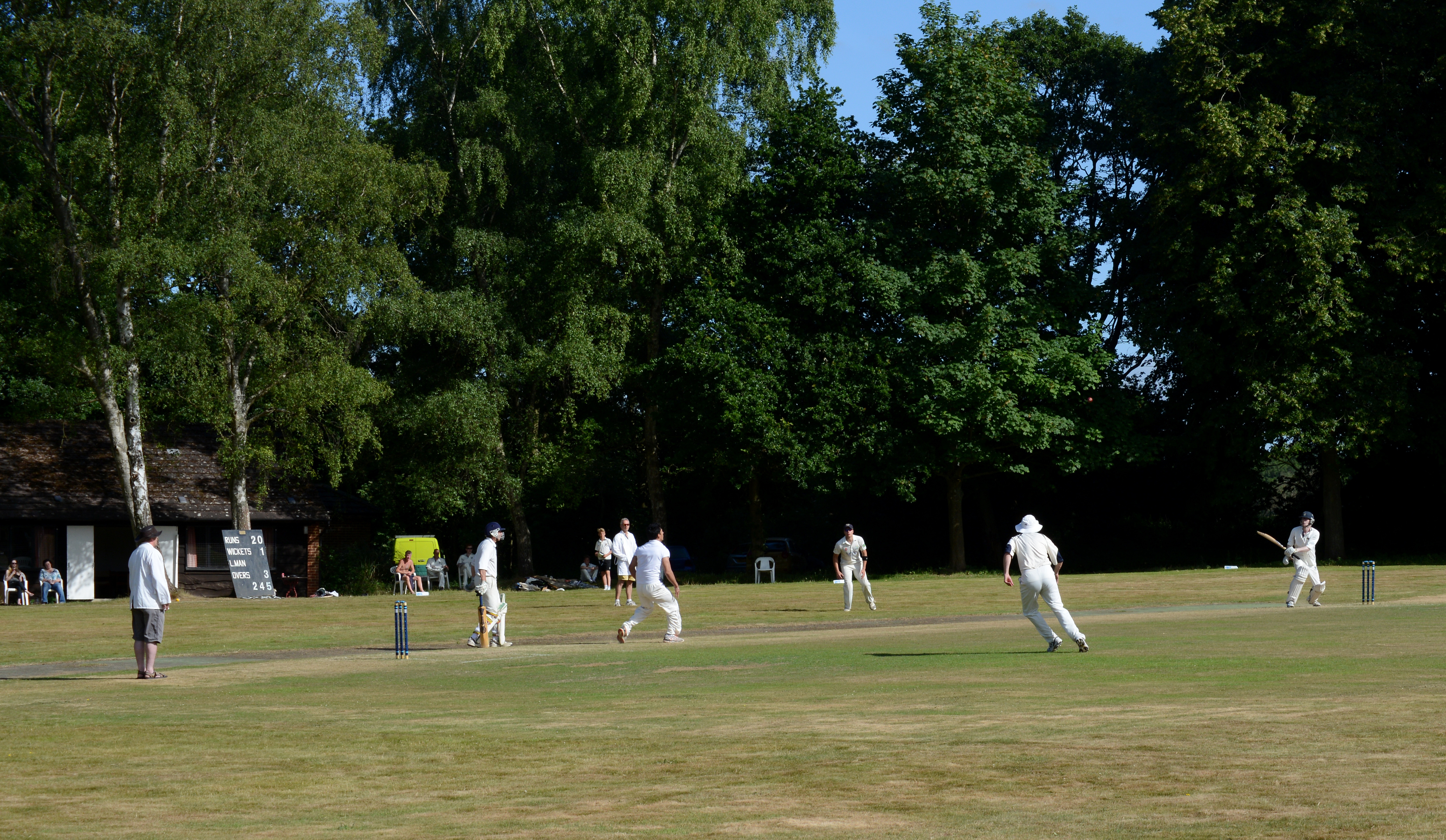
A village cricket match between Grafham and Smithbrook, and Alton in 2015

Grafham, like Bramley, is a settlement by the A281 Guildford-Horsham road and includes three roadside buildings that form part of Palmers Cross hamlet and Goose Green to the southwest. In shape it is a linear hamlet with 35 houses. The Grade II*-listed church, St Andrew's, is the burial place of its stone-specialist Gothic Revival architect Henry Woodyer. The church was built between 1861 and 1864 at his own expense; it has a statue of Saint Andrew and carvings of Woodyer himself, his wife and daughter.

There is a cricket ground in Grafham used by Blackheath CC.

=== Smithbrook ===
Smithbrook is a cluster of 26 buildings of which eight form Smithbrook kilns a former brick-making factory; it is centred 2 miles (3.2 km) south of Bramley village centre. Smithbrook Brickworks (1936) Ltd were its major operator. (See British quarrying and mining narrow gauge railways.)

== Demography and housing ==
2011 Census Homes
Output area	Detached	Semi-detached	Terraced	Flats and apartments	Caravans/temporary/mobile homes	shared between households
(Civil Parish)	608	388	186	208	5	2

The average level of accommodation in the region composed of detached houses was 28%, the average that was apartments was 22.6%.

2011 Census Key Statistics
Output area	Population	Households	% Owned outright	% Owned with a loan	hectares
(Civil Parish)	3,559	1,397	37.5%	33.3%	1,887

The proportion of households in the civil parish who owned their home outright compares to the regional average of 35.1%. The proportion who owned their home with a loan compares to the regional average of 32.5%. The remaining % is made up of rented dwellings (plus a negligible % of households living rent-free).
