= Hundred of Blackheath, Surrey =

Historical division of Surrey, England

Coordinates: 51.206°N 0.523°W

Blackheath Hundred or the Hundred of Blackheath was a hundred in the county of Surrey, England. It corresponds to parts of the districts of Waverley and Guildford.

== Use and significance ==
Though used for entirely secular purposes, it consisted of eleven parishes which in the polity of England from the Norman Conquest until the late 19th century had dual secular and religious functions. Its economic unity was shattered like most hundreds given the rise of smaller manors and newer manors which came to form the main, manageable agricultural asset throughout the country. It occupied approximately the south to south-west twelfth of the county.

Its parishes were

- Albury
- Alfold
- Bramley
- Cranleigh
- Dunsfold
- Ewhurst
- Hascombe
- St Martha
- Shalford
- Shere
- Wonersh

== History ==
The hundred court meeting place was on the River Wey at a place called Perry Bridge, or La Perie at the western edge of Shalford. The jurisdiction of the sheriff's court was much curtailed by private rights. In 1086 Odo, Earl of Kent (and Bishop of Bayeux) held Bramley, its central area. The Victoria County History attributes its conflation with Bramley to its stated size of 6½ hides of land, versus 97 stated to exist before the Norman Conquest in the same 'Domesday Book' survey document. The manorial lords of Bramley, Shalford, Wintershull, and Gomshall, and the rectors of Shalford and Cranleigh also had courts leet, and the lord of Albury view of frankpledge, but the latter gave those profits to the Crown. The lord of Shere claimed view of frankpledge up to 1238, the lord of Albury claimed the same, and it was granted to Bramley by charter of Henry III. These townships paid an annual fine to the sheriff. In 1671 Shere paid the most, at 20s. The royal rights, such as they were, were granted by James VI and I in 1620 to Sir Edward Zouche of Woking Palace, and to the heirs male of Sir Alan his uncle, together with the very large manor of Woking (the main asset), Woking Hundred and other lands, to be held by the service of bringing in the first dish to the king's table on St. James's Day and paying annually £100 (initially equivalent to £26,333 in 2023 but reduced in modern terms by inflation). All feudal system incidents were expressly abrogated at that time. Eventually the hundred rent ceased to be reclaimable from any tenants in the area.

Charles II granted the £100 rent and the reversion for 1,000 years legally to Viscount Grandison, Henry Howard, and Edward Villiers, in reality in trust for the first's daughter, his most favoured mistress, who he later created Duchess of Cleveland.

In 1708 James Zouche, younger son of Sir Edward, the last of the male heirs, died. The Duchess of Cleveland succeeded, but died on 9 October 1709. Her trustees in 1715 sold the rights, as well as in Woking, to John Walter of Busbridge House, Godalming, whose son sold them to Lord Onslow in 1752. The dwindling value hundreds later came to possess was lost outright by a process of population expansion and industrialisation, with rights and land ownership becoming bound up with the smaller estates within them in the 19th century.
