= George Francis Hill =

British numismatist

Sir George Hill
- In office 1931–1936
- Preceded by: Sir Frederic Kenyon
- Succeeded by: Sir John Forsdyke

Personal details
- Born: December 22, 1867 Berhampur, India
- Died: October 18, 1948 (aged 80) London, England
- Spouse: Mary Paul
- Education: Blackheath College; University College London; Merton College, Oxford
- Occupation: Director and Principal Librarian of the British Museum
- Awards: KCB; FBA; Medal of the Royal Numismatic Society (1915)

Sir George Francis Hill, KCB, FBA (22 December 1867 – 18 October 1948) was the director and principal librarian of the British Museum (1931–1936). He was a specialist in Renaissance medals.

== Early years ==
George Hill was born in Berhampur, India. His grandfather, Micaiah Hill, founded the London Missionary Society's outpost there and his father, Samuel John Hill, was stationed where George was born. He attended Blackheath College (later known as Eltham College) followed by University College, London, and finally Merton College, Oxford. He studied under Percy Gardner at Merton, taking a first class degree in classics. There he also gained an interest in numismatics. He was awarded the medal of the Royal Numismatic Society in 1915.

== Career ==
In 1893, Hill joined the British Museum in the Coins and Medals Department. At that time, the department was the centre of study of Greek coins. Hill continued the work of Barclay Head and Reginald Poole; in 1897 was published the first volume of a catalogue of Greek coins. Hill subsequently produced catalogues of many of the British Museum's collections in his area. In 1912, he became keeper of the department. In 1931, he was appointed Director and Principal Librarian of the British Museum. Whilst director, he purchased the Codex Sinaiticus from the Soviet Union and, with the Victoria and Albert Museum, the George Eumorfopoulos oriental antiquities collection.

Hill was editor of the Journal of Hellenic Studies from 1898 to 1912. He was knighted in 1933.

== Personal life ==
In 1897, he married Mary Paul, whose parents lived in Rome, Italy. He retired in 1936 and died in London in 1948.

== Bibliography ==
- Hill, George Francis, Historical Greek Coins, London : Archibald Constable and Co., 1906.
- Ward, John, Greek Coins and their Parent Cities, London : John Murray, 1902. (accompanied by a catalogue of the author's collection by Sir George Francis Hill)
- Hill, G. F. (1912). Portrait Medals of Italian Artists of the Renaissance. Medici Society. ISBN 9785876331984.
- Hill, George Francis, The Development of Arabic Numerals in Europe, Oxford, 1915.
- Hill, Francis, A History of Cyprus in 4 volumes, Cambridge, 1940–1952.
  - Vol. 1, To the Conquest by Richard Lion Heart, 1940. 2010 pbk reprint ISBN 978-1-108-02062-6
  - Vol. 2, The Frankish Period, 1192–1432, 1940. 2010 pbk reprint ISBN 978-1-108-02063-3
  - Vol. 3, The Frankish Period, 1432–1571, 1948. 2010 pbk reprint ISBN 978-1-108-02064-0
  - Vol. 4, (edited by Harry Luke) The Ottoman Province, the British Colony, 1571–1948, 1952; 2010 pbk reprint ISBN 978-1-108-02065-7
