= Christ Church, Shamley Green =

Christ Church
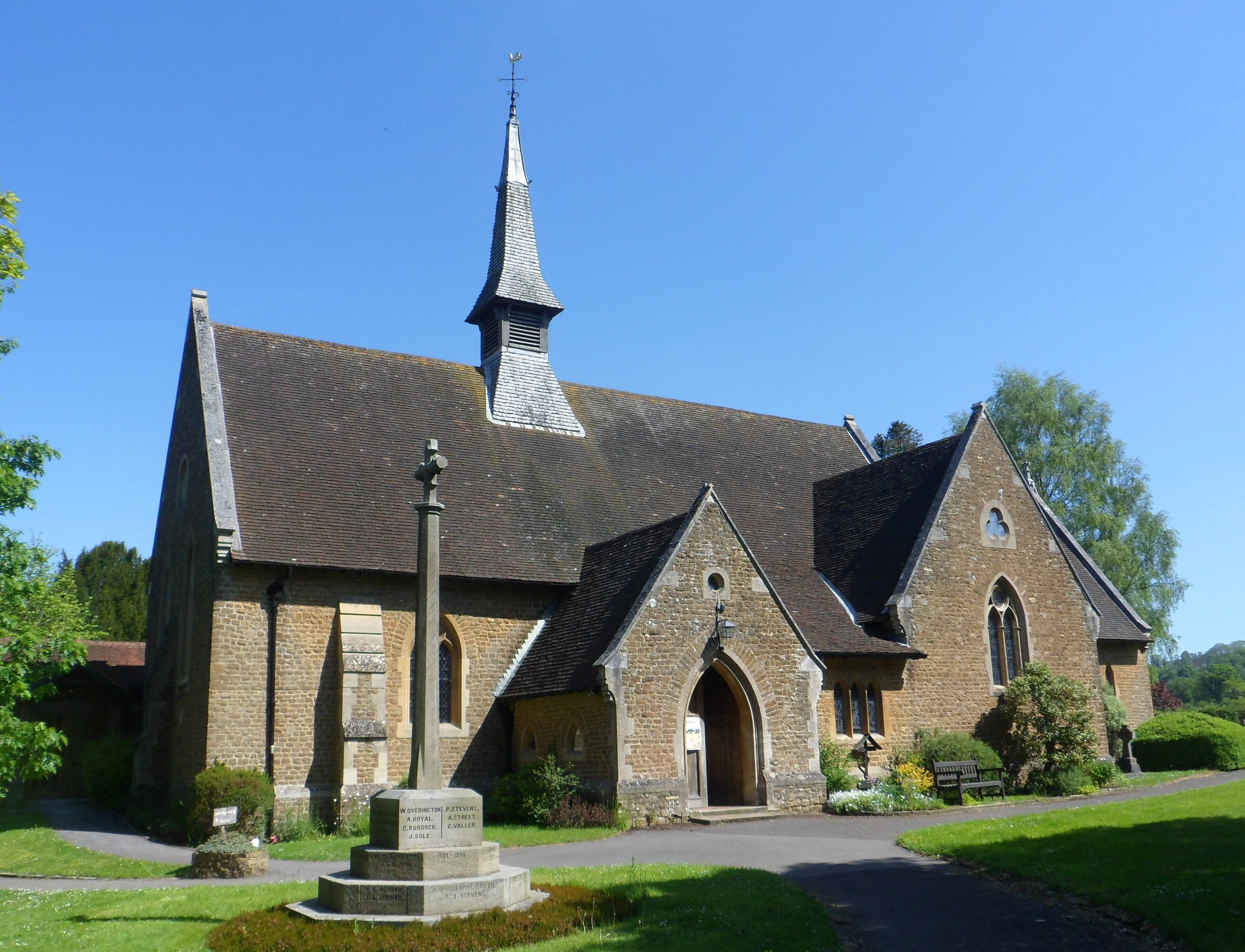
- Christ Church
- Christ Church
- 51°10′51″N 0°31′22″W
- Location: Shamley Green, Surrey
- Country: England
- Denomination: Church of England

History
- Status: Parish church
- Consecrated: 1881

Architecture
- Functional status: Active
- Heritage designation: Grade II listed
- Completed: 1863

Administration
- Province: Canterbury
- Diocese: Guildford
- Archdeaconry: Surrey
- Parish: Shamley Green

Christ Church is a Church of England parish church in Shamley Green, Surrey, England. It was constructed in 1863 as a chapel of ease and became a parish church in 1881. Christ Church is part of the Church of England's Diocese of Guildford and is a Grade II listed building.

== History ==
Christ Church was originally built as a chapel of ease for St John the Baptist Church in nearby Wonersh on land purchased from a Mr H. Street. The foundation stone for the chapel was laid by the Archdeacon of Surrey, John Utterton. In 1881, it was decided that the chapel of ease would become an independent parish church as Christ Church. The church has a fine collection of stained-glass windows. In 1986, it was granted Grade II listed status. In 1883, the vicar, Edgar Bowring, purchased land next to the church to build an eight-bedroom mansion, which he then sold to the Church Commissioners to become Christ Church's vicarage so that he would not have to pay for maintenance. This remained as the vicarage until 1935 when it was sold by the Church due to the cost of maintenance.

=== Graveyard ===
Christ Church had a graveyard, but by 1900 it was almost full. Additional land for burials was given to the church by George Cubitt, 1st Baron Ashcombe in 1900. Following the First and Second World Wars, the Commonwealth War Graves Commission became responsible for six of the graves of military personnel buried there, who included the former British Lions rugby union international John Selwyn Moll. The entertainer Tony Hart is also buried in the churchyard. as are the cremated remains of Sir Harry Secombe.

=== Walking trail ===
In 2016, it was selected as the starting point for a new circular walking trail in Surrey designed to pass by the Wey and Arun Canal and a number of iron railway bridges.

== See also ==
- List of places of worship in Waverley (borough)
