= Wintershall, Surrey =

Wintershall is a country estate and retreat centre near Bramley and Guildford in Surrey, England, best known for its outdoor biblical drama productions.

An estate of 1,000 acres, including woodland, lakes, and pastures, with several barns and chapels, it also has educational events and retreats, Stations of the Cross, and workshops for community groups, with a focus on biblical stories and Christian themes. The annual Christmas nativity play, established in 1990, is one of the largest in Europe. The same team produced a passion play in Trafalgar Square, London, each Easter from 2011 to 2026.

Eric Clapton played at a "Picnic Concert by the Chapel on the Lake" in June 2005, and again in June 2011.

The events have been developed by Peter and Ann Hutley, who began staging performances in 1989.

== See also ==
- The Quiet Garden Trust
