= Blackheath, Surrey =

Village in Surrey, England

Coordinates: 51°12′22″N 0°31′26″W

Blackheath
- Village
- Heath House

- Location within Surrey
- OS grid reference: TQ032462
- Civil parish: Wonersh
- District: Waverley
- Shire county: Surrey
- Region: South East
- Country: England
- Sovereign state: United Kingdom
- Post town: GODALMING
- Postcode district: GU4
- Dialling code: 01483
- Police: Surrey
- Fire: Surrey
- Ambulance: South East Coast
- UK Parliament: Godalming and Ash

Blackheath is a village in the civil parish of Wonersh, in the Waverley district, in the county of Surrey, England. Described by John Betjeman as a "pretty village with hardly any peasants", it is a lightly wooded east–west lineal settlement on the elevated heath about 1 mile (1.6 km) north-east of Wonersh village centre. It is a similar distance south of Chilworth. It is part of the Surrey Hills National Landscape. The centre of the village is a designated conservation area.

== History ==
Mesolithic (Stone Age) flint implements have been found in the village and forest of Blackheath.

The area appears in Domesday Book as the Hundred of Blacheatfeld.

In 1864, Queen Victoria attended a review of the local volunteer troops in Blackheath. She watched from a grandstand on Rosemary Hill as the defenders repelled an "attack" from the direction of Albury.

About 1923, the owner of "Tangley Way" a Mr Kennedy, had a wind generator installed by E Lancaster Burne to provide electricity to his house.

During World War 2, the village hall was initially used as a school for refugee children, later it became a canteen operated by ENSA, catering for Canadian troops billeted in the area before D-Day.

== Architecture ==
Blackheath is architecturally a Victorian heathland settlement with many pioneering Arts and Crafts movement buildings by Charles Harrison Townsend, among them St Martin's church. Built in 1893, it is based upon the design of an Italian wayside chapel. The interior is decorated with a set of murals in the Pre-Raphaelite style, executed in 1894/5 by the American artist, Anna Lea Merritt. The church is a Grade II listed building.

== Transport ==
The nearest railway station is Chilworth on the North Downs Line.
