= Wonersh =

Coordinates: 51°11′54″N 0°32′48″W

- Village and civil parish
- The Street

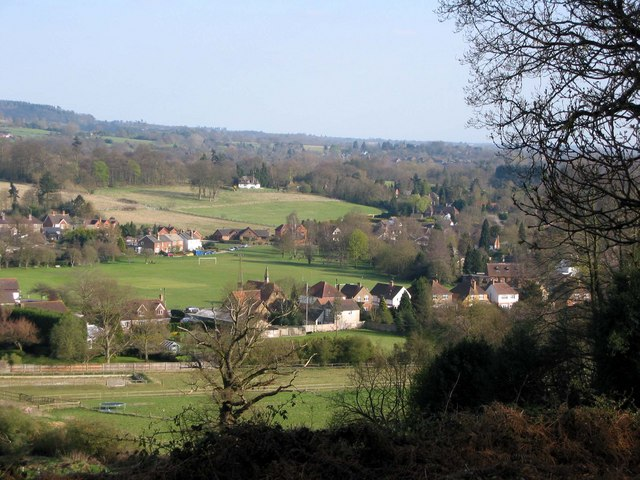
- Part of the village and Surrey Hills National Landscape

- Location within Surrey
- Area: 17.18 km^{2} (6.63 sq mi)
- Population: 3,412 (Civil Parish 2011)
  - Density: 199/km^{2} (520/sq mi)
- OS grid reference: TQ016453
- Civil parish: Wonersh
- District: Waverley
- Shire county: Surrey
- Region: South East
- Country: England
- Sovereign state: United Kingdom
- Post town: Guildford
- Postcode district: GU5
- Dialling code: 01483
- Police: Surrey
- Fire: Surrey
- Ambulance: South East Coast
- UK Parliament: Godalming and Ash

Wonersh is a village and civil parish in the Waverley district of Surrey, England and Surrey Hills National Landscape. The parish contains three conservation areas and spans an area 3 to 6 miles (4.8 to 9.7 km) SSE of Guildford.

In the outer London commuter belt, the village is 28 miles (45 km) southwest of London. Wonersh's economy is predominantly a service sector economy. Three listed churches are within the parish boundaries, as are a number of notable buildings.

== Etymology ==
Records show the name as Wonherche, (14th century); Ognersh and Ignersh, (16th and 17th centuries). The form Woghenersh, in a Charter roll of 1305, indicates the (Old English) formation (aet) wogan ersce, 'at the crooked field'.

== History ==
=== Pre-Roman settlement ===
Mesolithic (Stone Age) flint implements have been found in the hamlet and forest of Blackheath and near Chinthurst Hill.

=== Middle Ages ===
The core of the parish church appears to be pre-conquest indicating a settlement has existed in Wonersh village centre since Anglo-Saxon times.

There are six medieval manors in the parish: Tangley or Great Tangley; Little Tangley; Halldish; Losterford/Lostiford; Rowleys and Chinthurst (partly in the parish of Shalford) built on lands then in Bramley and Shalford.

=== Post Renaissance ===
Until the Charity Commission amalgamation in 1908, Wonersh had a number of charity endowments paying out for its poor: John Austen of Shalford left money for poor relief in 1620. Henry Chennell of Wonersh left land whose produce was to be devoted to putting six poor boys to school from 1672 and Mr Gwynne of London gave land and bank stock in 1698 to put four poor boys to school and to distribute bread to fifteen poor persons every Sunday after service.

Wonersh was one of the flourishing seats of the clothing trade in West Surrey. The special manufacture was blue cloth, known as Guildford Blue or kersey, it was dyed with woad, the licence to grow which was granted in the 16th century by Elizabeth I. The growing of woad was tightly controlled to protect customs duties.

The 17th-century Wonersh Park house was demolished in 1935. Part of the surrounding deer park was purchased by Beatrice Cook, wife of Frank Cook, and donated to the village. It is now a public green in front of and beside the church. The surviving gatehouse, itself Grade II listed, houses a protected species of bat.

== Geography ==
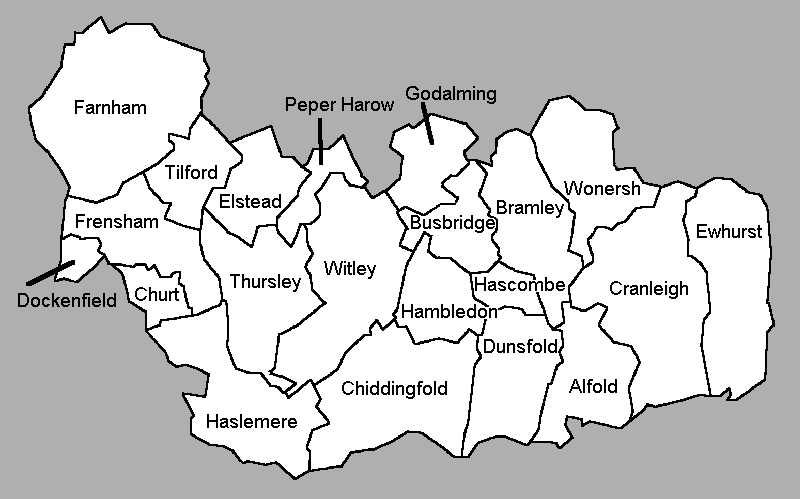
Waverley map showing the location of Wonersh Parish

Spanning 3 to 6 miles (4.8 to 9.7 km) SSE of Guildford. and in the outer London commuter belt, the centre of the village is 28 miles (45 km) southwest of London.

Flanked by two round hills; Chinthurst Hill, which reaches a height of 121 m (397 ft), north west of the village and Barnett Hill, with a height of 112 m (367 ft), east of the village, the village centre ranges between 40 and 50 m (130 and 160 ft) above sea level. Two-thirds of the pine heath and mixed forest-covered high ground of Blackheath Common is included in the parish.

Grassy expanses of Smithwood Common in the south and Wonersh Common in the north are in the civil parish; over 2,000 acres (810 ha) of the southeast is Winterfold Wood and Heath an ancient forested part of the Weald, with parts managed by Surrey Wildlife Trust.

=== Elevations, geology and soil ===
The parish rises from west to east up the eroded basin of Cranleigh Waters holding the villages to the flint, clay, greensand and sandy soil topped Greensand Ridge. Elevations vary from 39 m (128 ft) AOD by the Bramley/Wonersh bridge over the stream to 207 m (679 ft) at the car park on Winterfold Hill, Winterfold Heath.

Geologically the landscape demonstrates the contrast between the retention of the top of the Greensand Ridge from coastal deposition followed by sea level changes and the formation of the lower Weald because of water erosion on the three-county-sized calciferous and sandy beds south of this ridge. The Ridge forms the highest hills in the south east, excluding the southwest Berkshire Downs.

Soil is a slowly permeable loamy/clayey slightly acid but base-rich soil except for the higher ground, including Blackheath, which is a slightly acidic freely draining sandy soil containing small areas of wet impeded drainage heathland soil.

== Demography and housing ==
2021 Census Homes
Output area	Detached	Semi-detached	Terraced	Flats and apartments	Caravans, temporary, mobile homes	shared between households	Converted building	Commercial building (Note: eg hotel)
(Civil Parish)	762	410	111	57	6	24	7	8

2021 Census Key Statistics
Output area	Population	Male	Female	Households
(Civil Parish)	3,450	1,633	1,818	1,390

Wonersh has a predominantly service economy, reflected in the official categorisation table of occupation, compiled from the 2021 census:

2021 Census Occupations
Category	Number
Managers, directors and senior officials	371
Professional occupations	428
Associate professional and technical occupations	239
Administrative and secretarial occupations	125
Skilled trades occupations	124
Caring, leisure and other service occupations	92
Sales and customer service occupations	62
Process, plant and machine operatives	33
Elementary occupations	73

== Amenities ==
Grantley Arms

Wonersh has a village shop and post office which is owned by a village co-operative. There is a small art gallery next door. The Grantley Arms is the central pub/restaurant, which is often used for functions. Both the shop and the pub are situated in the centre of the village by the pepper pot, which is a small shelter in the middle of the junction of Guildford Road and The Street. The area's doctors surgery is opposite the post office. Its purpose-built right wing was opened in 1972 and extended in 1982.

== Culture and community ==
=== Sport ===
Wonersh village green is where local teams play football, cricket and stoolball. The sports pavilion has a bar, meeting room and changing facilities.

Wonersh Bowling Club was founded in 1925 and is situated behind the Memorial Hall. The club is affiliated to both the English and Surrey Bowling Associations. The bowling green has six full sized rinks. The pavilion has, in addition to changing rooms, a dining area, a kitchen and a licensed bar. The bowling season runs from the beginning of April through to the end of September.

=== Societies ===
Wonersh Players are an amateur dramatic society that has existed since 1982. They write, produce and perform their own pantomimes, performed at the Wonersh Memorial Hall, usually during the February half term holiday.

In 1993, Wonersh History Society was formed to preserve and build on a quantity of historical material and notes gathered over many years by the late Anthony Fanshaw. A social club named Wonersh Village Club, was founded over a hundred years ago as the Wonersh & District Working Men's Club. It provides a venue for playing snooker, billiards, darts and card games. There is an active Wonersh U3A, a gardening club and a scout group.

== Churches ==
St John the Baptist's Church

The parish church of St John the Baptist has a 12th-century bell tower, 13th-century chancel, 15th-century north chapel and 1793 south aisle (Note: This part of the church was funded by Lord Grantley) including transept. It had tower crenellations added in 1751. The ecclesiastical parish is joined with Blackheath and lies within the Guildford diocese. According to H E Malden:

The painted glass is all modern and exceptionally good, especially that in the east window of the north chapel, with figures of St. George and St. Alban.
A few slight traces of mediæval colour decoration remain, as on the voussoirs of the chancel arch.

The church was formerly a chapel (of Shalford), and as such the advowson (right to appoint the vicar) was in the presentation of the King who later transferred it to St Mary without Bishopsgate in London; after this it was held by a line of nobles until bought in the 19th century by the lord of the manor. As a chapel, the great tithes were commuted for £700 and the lesser for the vicar for £17. (Note: There is no mention of any glebe so Chancel repair liability seems not to apply; the extent of the rectorial manor of Shalford did not extend to Wonersh) The church is Grade II* listed.

The United Reformed church overlooks the village common and is Grade II listed. St John's Seminary opened in 1891 for the training of Roman Catholic priests. Due to falling intake, the seminary closed in 2022. Built in the Italian Renaissance style, the building is also Grade II listed.

== Localities ==
The parish contains three villages, Wonersh itself, Shamley Green, and Blackheath, smaller settlements include Ridgebridge Hill, Whipley, Plonk's Hill, Woodhill, Lordshill Common and Norley Common.

A small stream, known as Dobyn's Brook, runs east to west between Wonersh and Shamley Green. A tributary of Cranleigh Waters it powered a fulling mill and oil leather works at Upper Lostiford and a corn mill at Wonersh. The former was demolished about 1900, the latter is used as storage and is Grade II listed.

=== Willinghurst Copses forming the west of Winterfold Forest and Heath ===
Lakes below Willinghurst

This forested area of the southeast adjoins Winterfold Forest. In its middle is Willingshurst House, an 1887 Arts and Crafts property by Philip Webb, sometimes called the father of arts and crafts and son of commercial and residential buildings architect Sir Aston Webb. The various sections of the forest are named Spring Wood, The Shaws, The Ball, Madgehole, South, Great, Dean, Pithouse, Rock and Lapscombe Copses. A car park is on top of Winterfold Heath on the Cranleigh parish boundary in the middle of the southern Winterfold Heath section.

South of the main forest is a series of 11 woodland lakes – one is large enough to allow boats – used for fishing and woodland walks.

== Landmarks ==
Wonersh Conservation Area contains 27 listed buildings at least ten of which are early and late Tudor period.

=== The Dower House ===
The Dower House is the largest building on Barnett Lane. In 1710 most all of its exterior was built – the date of foundations and chimneys is uncertain – in red brick with plain hipped tiles and five 12-pane glazing bar sash windows to its first floor. Its architectural features represent typical authentic Queen Anne style architecture. It is Grade II* listed.

=== Wonersh Court ===
At the end of The Street, behind a large listed entrance arch, are eight courtyard townhouses, the original stables and parade ring to the demolished mansion at Wonersh Park, converted and divided in 1745–1759 by the owner, Fletcher Norton, first Lord Grantley. The buildings are of red and brown brick with some blue brick headers in arches over windows, painted weatherboard to first floor of rear (south) range. Architecturally the building is Grade II-listed.

=== Great Tangley Manor ===
In the 15th century a hall house was built on the motte and remains as the core of the manor house, The main portion was built by Richard Caryll in 1584. In 1582 the manor had become the residence of John and Lettice Carrill and descended to their grandson John Carrill (d. 1656) and his widow Hester, who secondly married Sir Francis Duncombe. Wickham Flower employed Philip Webb to restore and extend the house in 1884 and in 1906, Colonel Hegan Kennard employed Inigo Thomas to build the north wing.

Set a few metres above a narrow square moat, Great Tangley Manor has been well preserved and has been the subject of many paintings as have its garden and lily pond. A long entrance tunnel, added by Philip Webb, with a sandstone and brick wall on one side and an open timber 12-bay arcade on the other, crosses the moat. This medieval and Elizabethan building is Grade I listed and has Victorian gardens. The main front facing south-east is decorative timber frame with whitewashed render infill and remainder is brick and whitewashed extensions on the south wing, ashlar ground floor and roughcast above on rounded north wing.

=== Barnett Hill ===
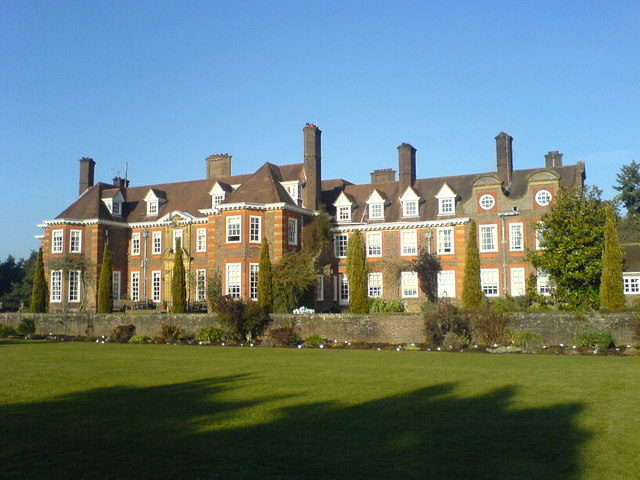
Barnett Hill south front

In 1905, Barnett Hill was built by Frank Cook, the grandson of Thomas Cook, who constructed a Queen Anne-style mansion at a cost of £35,000. The architect was Arnold Mitchell who chose an expensive and ornate masonry Carolean style. Purple/brown bricks with red brick and yellow stone dressings form its walls. Roofing consists of hipped plain tiled several roof slopes over a wooden eaves cornice around its roof, incorporating dormer windows. Spread over three above ground floors the venue is on a short H-shaped plan with a long service wing in an identical style. Ground floor windows have 24 panes each and keystone lintels. In the angles between wings are square turrets and a recessed range under copper ogee domes with spherical finials. The house later passed to the Red Cross who owned it until 2006. Today, it is a 4* hotel, conference and events venue. The house is Grade II* listed.

=== Chinthurst Hill ===
A 1930s folly tower tops this 397-foot (121 m) asl knoll. Surrey Wildlife Trust manage the hill's woodland and tower. It is the 31st highest hill in the county and a stand-alone outcrop of the Greensand Ridge which restarts in parishes east and west on its course from Hampshire to Kent.

== Transport ==
The main road through Wonersh is the B2128, which links the village to Shamley Green, Cranleigh and Guildford. The nearest railway station is Shalford, on the North Downs Line. Until 1965, when the line closed, the village was served by Bramley & Wonersh station on the Cranleigh line.

== Education ==
There is a preschool in Wonersh and a shared primary school, Wonersh and Shamley Green C of E Primary School.

== Notable residents ==
- William Howard Seth-Smith III (1852–1928), architect, born in the hamlet of Tangley.

== See also ==
- List of places of worship in Waverley (borough)
