= Cranleigh =

Village and parish in Surrey, England

Coordinates: 51°08′11″N 0°28′42″W

- Village
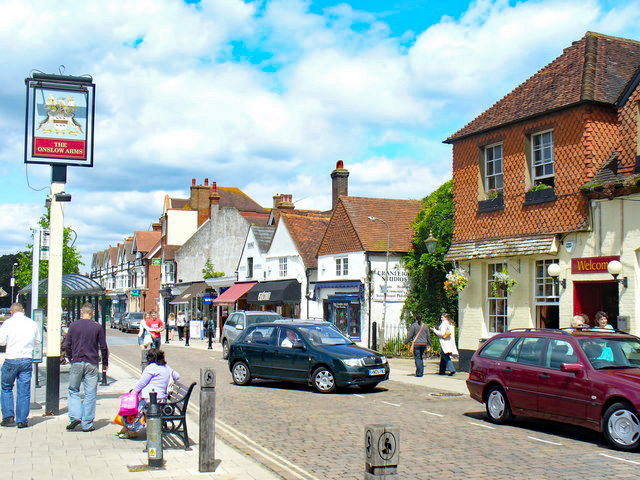
- Cranleigh High Street

- Coat of arms of Cranleigh

- Location within Surrey
- Area: 32.78 km^{2} (12.66 sq mi)
- Population: 11,241 (Civil Parish 2011)
  - Density: 343/km^{2} (890/sq mi)
- OS grid reference: TQ065385
- Civil parish: Cranleigh
- District: Waverley
- Shire county: Surrey
- Region: South East
- Country: England
- Sovereign state: United Kingdom
- Post town: CRANLEIGH
- Postcode district: GU6
- Dialling code: 01483
- Police: Surrey
- Fire: Surrey
- Ambulance: South East Coast
- UK Parliament: Godalming and Ash

Cranleigh is a village and civil parish in the Borough of Waverley, Surrey, England. It lies 8 miles (13 km) southeast of Guildford on a minor road east of the A281, which links Guildford with Horsham. It is in the north-west corner of the Weald, a large remnant forest, the main local remnant being Winterfold Forest directly north-west on the northern Greensand Ridge. In 2011 it had a population of just over 11,000.

== Etymology ==
Until the mid-1860s, the place was usually spelt Cranley. The Post Office persuaded the vestry to use "-leigh" to avoid misdirections to nearby Crawley in West Sussex. The older spelling is publicly visible in the Cranley Hotel. The name is recorded in the Pipe Rolls as Cranlea in 1166 and Cranelega in 1167. A little later in the Feet of Fines of 1198 the name is written as Cranele. Etymologists consider all these versions to be the fusion of the Old English words "Cran", meaning "crane", and "Lēoh" that together mean 'a woodland clearing visited by cranes'. The name is popularly believed to come from imputed large crane-breeding grounds at the Anglo-French named Vachery Pond, often locally known as Vachery. The figure of a crane adorns the old drinking water fountain of 1874 in 'Fountain Square' in the middle of the village. A pair of cranes adorn the crest of the 21st century granted coat of arms of Cranleigh Parish Council.

== History ==
=== Early history ===
Partly on the Greensand Ridge, where it rises to 700 feet (210 m) at Winterfold Hill, but mainly on the clay and sandstone Lower Weald, Cranleigh has little of prehistoric or Roman interest, whereas just across the east border Wykehurst and Rapley Farms have Roman buildings and Roman Tile Kilns – in the parish of Ewhurst. A spur of the Roman road between London and Chichester runs north west to Guildford past nearby Farley Heath in Farley Green, a temple site. Cranleigh was not mentioned in the Domesday Book, at that time being part of the manor of Shere.

The Anglican parish church of St Nicolas dates the first building on its site from around 1170, and the building was in its present form by the mid-14th century. It was extensively restored in 1847. The church has a gargoyle, on a pillar inside the church, which is said to have inspired Lewis Carroll, who lived in Guildford, to create the Cheshire Cat. With the growth of the village, a "daughter" church, St Andrew's, opened at the west end of the village in 1900 but it closed some sixty years later. The parish is in the Diocese of Guildford.

The 16th century Boy & Donkey pub, on Knowle Road outside the village, was taken over in the mid-19th century by Hodgsons of Kingston, later Courage, and remained in business until the early 1990s. It was sold to Morland of Abingdon who later closed it. The building was converted into a private home.

Oliver Cromwell visited Knowle House in 1657, his soldiers being billeted in houses in the village.

=== Post Industrial Revolution ===
Growth came due to improvements in transport; in 1813 the Wey and Arun Canal was authorised. Three years later it opened, passing a few miles to the west of the village. This route linked London (via the Thames and the Wey) with Littlehampton (via the Arun). However, the canal traffic was completely eclipsed by the Horsham to Guildford railway which opened in 1865, and the canal fell into disuse. A turnpike road was also built between Guildford and Horsham, assent for the project being given in 1818. The opening is commemorated by an obelisk at the junction of the roads to Horsham and to Ewhurst. The Prince Regent used the route when travelling between Windsor and Brighton, the distances to which are given on the plaque on the obelisk.

Three people played a major part in the development of the village during the 19th century: Reverend John Henry Sapte, Dr Albert Napper and Stephen Rowland. Sapte arrived in Cranleigh in 1846 as the rector. He played a major role in setting up the National School in 1847 and Cranleigh School in 1865. He was appointed Archdeacon of Surrey and remained in the village until his death in 1906.

Together with Napper, Sapte set up the first cottage hospital in the country in 1859. It has survived many attempts to close it, through fundraising by the local community. However it lost its beds for in-patients in May 2006.

Stephen Rowland was a resident who had a major role in the development of the infrastructure of the village. He formed the Cranleigh Gas Company in 1876, and arranged for a mains water supply in 1886. In 1894 he laid out an estate between the Horsham and Ewhurst Roads, building New Park Road, Avenue Road, Mead Road, Mount Road and Bridge Road. He also set up a grocery store. His name is commemorated in that of Rowland Road.

The cricket field has been used for that purpose since 1843. Cranleigh Lawn Tennis Tournament was held there in August from 1922 until 1998, when it moved to the grounds of Cranleigh School.

David Mann's department store opened in 1887. The store closed in October 2021 and the business went into liquidation.

A distinctive row of maple trees which lines the High Street between the cricket field and the Rowland Road junction was planted in 1890, and not by Canadian servicemen in World War I as is widely believed.

Cranleigh's Village Hall opened in 1933.

The Regal Cinema opened on 30 October 1936. It survived for over sixty years, finally closing on 14 March 2002. The site is now occupied by a block of flats.

=== During World War II (1939-1945) ===
Winterfold House near Cranleigh was requisitioned by the British Government and used by SOE Special Operations Executive, as a training school designated STS 4 and later STS 7 as the location of the Student Assessment Board. Its primary use during the war was to whittle out those not suited to undercover work and begin initial training for those that progressed. Amongst the many recruits that attended Winterfold included Muriel Byck, Andrée Borrel, Denise Bloch, Noor Inyat Khan (Nora Baker) – a descendant of Indian Muslim royalty and Violette Szabo GC. A film Carve Her Name with Pride was made in 1958 about Szabo's wartime life in the SOE. In November 2011, a Memorial to the SOE was unveiled at Winterfold House, Surrey, initiated by British military historian, writer and author Paul McCue and others. The unveiling was attended by Tania Szabó, the daughter of Violette Szabo, together with representatives from the US, Dutch and French embassies and the Canadian High Commission.

During the later part of World War II, on 27 August 1944, the infants school was hit by a V-1 flying bomb and demolished, as was the stained glass east window of the nearby St. Nicolas Church. This occurred early on a Sunday morning, and the school was empty. The only casualty was the Rector, who was in his garden not far away and was injured. Another flying bomb hit the gasholder on the Common, destroying both the structure and a nearby cottage, whose occupant was killed.

=== Post-war ===
Cranleigh railway station was closed under the Beeching axe in 1965 after almost exactly a hundred years of operation.

In 1975 the 1900-built church of St Andrew was demolished.

== Geography ==
Cranleigh village is 7.7 miles (12.4 km) southeast of the county town of Surrey, Guildford, and 6.2 miles (10.0 km) ESE of Godalming, which is the administrative centre of the borough of Waverley. In the centre of the civil parish are the greatest number of buildings, fanning out in many side roads and on the high street. Cranleigh Waters also known as the Cranleigh Water, drains the village, before flowing to Shalford where it joins the River Wey, specifically in the small, formerly marsh-like locality of Peasmarsh, which still has water meadows lining the bank itself. Winterfold Forest, a remaining higher part of the forest that occupies the northeast is on the Greensand Ridge, which can be explored using in places roads or by the long-distance path, the Greensand Way.

=== Localities ===
==== Rowly ====
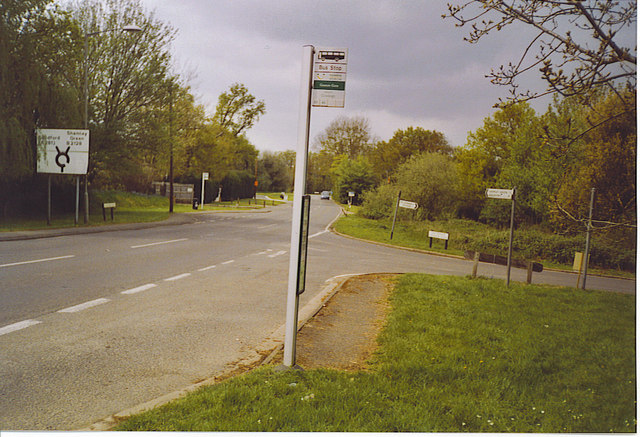
Gaston Gate, Guildford Road, Rowly

Rowly is a neighbourhood 0.8 miles (1.3 km) NNW of the edge of the contiguous suburban part of Cranleigh that architecturally contains three Grade II listed buildings.
Three surrounding farms have listed farmhouses, and one of these has a listed granary. Rowly is separated from Cranleigh by Manfield Park and Hollyhocks House.

==== Baynards ====
Baynards to the south is separated by a green buffer including the lake, Vachery Pond. It consists of fewer than 20 buildings. Reached by Knowle Lane, a rural road leading off of the high street, which is dotted with houses, the settlement lies east of that lane along another lane, Baynards Road. No other neighbourhoods or localities of importance exist in the civil parish as a whole.

=== Elevations, soil and geology ===
Elevations range from a maximum of 240 m AOD (mean high water level) at the car park on Reynolds Hill in Winterfold Heath (a woodland in the north) to 41 m on the watercourse and the disused Wey and Arun Canal as they leave both the parish in the northwest extreme at the end of East Whipley Lane. The village centre lies at generally 50–70 m above AOD.

Soil consists in small areas of "naturally wet loamy soil"; the north and south of the village centre and all surrounding areas are "slowly permeable seasonally wet slightly acid but base-rich loamy and clayey soils".

Gault Clay and the Upper Greensand deposits form the deep soil, more evident where erosion has taken place on steeper hillslopes in the civil parish. The Gault Clay contains phosphate-rich nodules in discrete bands and has a rich marine fauna with abundant ammonites, bivalves and gastropods. The Upper Greensand comprises a variety of sediments with fine silts at the base, giving way upwards into sandstones. Just before the paleogene which included the mass-extinction event of the non-avian dinosaurs, sea levels dropped, exposing Sussex and Kent; marine Upnor Beds were deposited in Surrey. In the paleogene, Southern England slightly rose and the seas retreated and reddish and mottled clays of the Reading Beds were deposited by a large river sand delta system including across much of the Weald (which covers much of Sussex and Kent as well). Later, a rise in sea level around 50 million years ago caused widespread deposition, until 2 million years ago, of the London Clay across the county. The London Clay is a bluish-grey marine clay with isolated pockets of fossils especially where chalkier. The youngest part of the London Clay is known as the Claygate Beds and sand and soft sandstone of the Bagshot Formation, though in many areas such as this generally eroded, followed in most cases by a variable thickness of organic humus.

== Education ==
Cranleigh School, an independent boarding school, is in the village. It opened in 1865 and was originally known as "The Surrey County School".

State schools include Glebelands School (a secondary school), Cranleigh C of E Primary School and Park Mead Primary School. There is also St Cuthbert Mayne Catholic Primary School. Cranleigh C of E Primary School opened in September 2008 as an amalgamation of Cranleigh Infants School and St. Nicolas Junior School.

In 1847 the National School opened in the present Arts Centre, replacing earlier dame schools. During the twentieth century, separate infant and secondary schools were formed and moved to their own premises (leaving the C of E Junior School which moved to new buildings in 1964).

== Recreation and entertainment ==
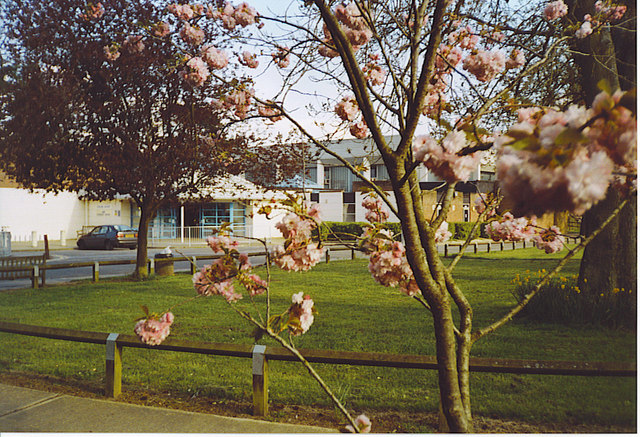
Cranleigh Leisure Centre

The Cranleigh Arts Centre runs a full programme of feature film screenings, live music, theatre productions, adult and children's activities, exhibitions and workshops. Regular community arts projects and work with local schools are undertaken to reach and develop new audiences. The centre is a registered charity and is run by a team of volunteers.

The village has a relatively large public library.

A gym and leisure centre (which incorporates an indoor swimming pool) is centrally just off the High Street.

Snoxhall Fields incorporates a few fields very near to the centre of Cranleigh, accessed by car via Knowle Lane. Across the road lies the Bruce McKenzie Memorial Field where Cranleigh Parkrun is organised on a weekly basis. Running through Snoxhall Fields is the path of the disused railway line which is now commonly used for cycling and walking.

The football club, Cranleigh F.C. currently play in the Surrey Elite West Division and previously at times in the Combined Counties League.

Cranleigh Cricket Club play at Horseshoe Lane.

Cranleigh Hockey Club is a field hockey club that play at Cranleigh School, and compete in the South East Hockey League.

Every year the Cranleigh & South Eastern Agricultural Society host the Cranleigh Show, a traditional agricultural show.

In 2023 a 60-acre country park was opened at Knowle Park to the south of the High Street. It included a lake, business kiosks, walks and children’s playground.

== Religion ==
There is a Roman Catholic church, Jesus Christ Redeemer of Mankind (in the Roman Catholic Diocese of Arundel & Brighton), and churches of the Methodist and Baptist denominations, as well as the Anglican church of St Nicolas mentioned above.

== Transport ==
=== Rail ===
Cranleigh railway station was opened in 1865 as "Cranley" as part of the Cranleigh Line, its name was changed in 1867 to "Cranleigh" at the request of the Postmaster General as badly addressed letters to "Cranley" were often mistaken for "Crawley" and vice versa. Cranleigh was the busiest station on the line with regular commuter traffic to and from London via Guildford. Cranleigh had a substantial goods yard equipped with a large loading gantry. Inward freight consisted mainly of coal which was required, in particular, by the local gasworks, whilst goods outward were mainly timber.

A victim of the Beeching Axe, the line closed in 1965 and Cranleigh station was demolished shortly afterwards, replaced by the "Stocklund Square" housing and shopping development. In 2004 part of this development was itself demolished and a Sainsbury's supermarket was constructed on the site. Today the trackbed is in part used by the Downs Link, and the station's old platform levels are still visible at the rear of the shops.

Two studies have been carried out to review the possibility of reviving train services. The first, in the 1990s, was to determine whether re-opening a portion of the line for passenger traffic from Bramley to Guildford would be economically viable. Although the study was inconclusive, Waverley Borough Council protected the line from further development in its Local Plan. In 2009, the Association of Train Operating Companies applied for funding for a new line to Cranleigh.

=== Road ===
Cranleigh centres around the junction of two B roads to the east of the A281 Guildford to Horsham road.

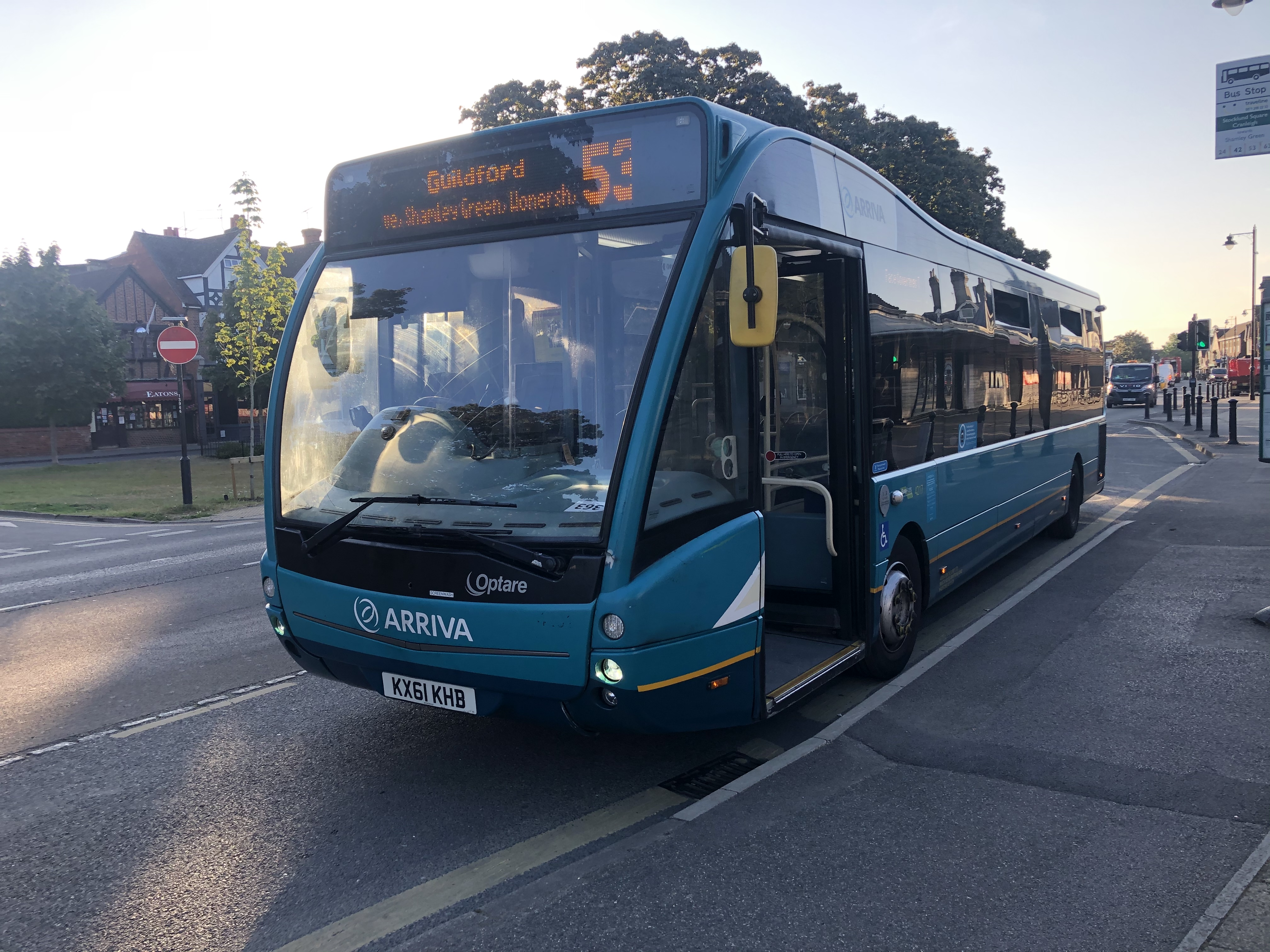
Bus at Stocklund Square

The village is on a number of bus routes serving, among others, Guildford, Horsham, Godalming and Ewhurst. The main operators are Compass Travel and Stagecoach South.

Tillingbourne Bus Company was based in the village prior to its collapse in 2001.

=== Canal ===
The Wey and Arun Canal is gradually being restored.

== Landmarks ==
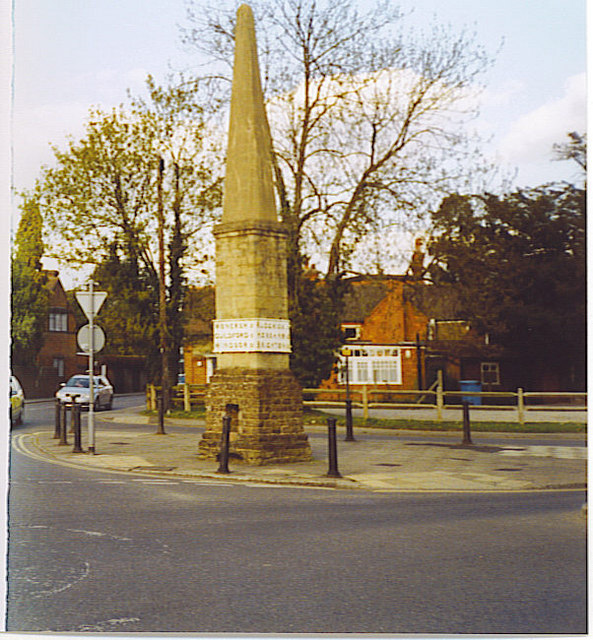
Obelisk Cranleigh High Street

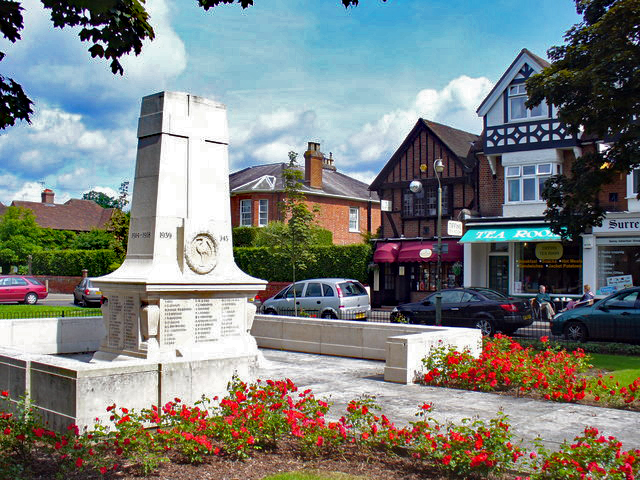
Rose Garden and War Memorial

=== Stocklund Square ===
A square near the centre of the village on the High Street, which is the main road running through Cranleigh. It was constructed following the closing of the railway line in 1965, and the removal of the railway station.

The square used to have greenery and a fountain, but this was replaced with a more open layout catering for attractions and events such as a town-style public Easter Service and a French Market.

=== Fountain Square ===
In 2006, the pedestrian area surrounding the large stone drinking fountain (1874) at the centre of the village was re-modelled, and given the name 'Fountain Square'. New granite paving, brick planters and trees were introduced in a design which created a haven from traffic and a place for small community events. As part of this a bus shelter sometime nicknamed the Threepenny Bit Shelter was remodelled at Snoxhall behind the leisure centre. Within a few weeks it was vandalised and pulled to the ground. The bulk of funding was from Surrey County Council (SCC) and the South East England Development Agency (SEEDA), to designs by SCC.

=== Winterfold House ===
Winterfold House, north-east of the village along Barhatch Lane, was built in 1886 for Richard Webster QC, afterwards Viscount Alverstone. He became Lord Chief Justice in 1900 and died in 1915. A bench in the woodland above the house is known as 'Lord Justice Seat'.

The house was then bought by Charles Armytage-Moore, founder partner in the stockbrokers Buckmaster & Moore. He reconstructed the main facade in Queen Anne style, and enhanced the gardens with rare rhododendrons, camellias, azaleas and magnolias. One particular red-flowered species (Rhododendron barbatum Wallich ex G. Don 1834) won an Award of Merit when exhibited by Winterfold House in 1934. During World War II Winterfold was requisitioned by the Government and used by the Special Operations Executive (SOE) as a training school designated STS 4. Amongst the many recruits that attended Winterfold were Violette Szabo GC.

Armytage-Moore died in 1960. The house was sold to HRH Prince Carol of Romania. It achieved notoriety by being searched for evidence after the Great Train Robbery of 1963, but nothing was found. The house and estate of 212 acres (0.86 km^{2}) was sold in 18 lots at auction in 1978.

== In popular culture ==
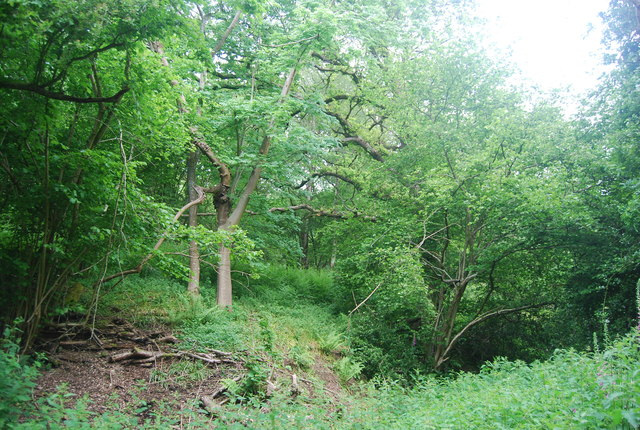
Woodland within Jelleys Hollow

Cranleigh appears in the book The Meaning of Liff by Douglas Adams and John Lloyd, in which experiences which do not have words yet are given words which currently only exist as names of places. "Cranleigh" is defined as: "A mood of irrational irritation with everyone and everything."

Some scenes of the Star Wars series Andor were filmed on location at Jelleys Hollow.

== Demography and housing ==
2011 Census Homes
Output area	Detached	Semi-detached	Terraced	Flats and apartments	Caravans/temporary/mobile homes	shared between households
(Civil Parish)	2,089	1,137	667	881	5	0

The average level of accommodation in the region composed of detached houses was 28%, the average that was apartments was 22.6%.

2011 Census Key Statistics
Output area	Population	Households	% Owned outright	% Owned with a loan	hectares
(Civil Parish)	11,492	4,779	43.3%	32.2%	3,278

The proportion of households in the civil parish who owned their home outright compares to the regional average of 35.1%. The proportion who owned their home with a loan compares to the regional average of 32.5%. The remaining % is made up of rented dwellings (plus a negligible % of households living rent-free).

== Notable residents ==
- Sky News presenter Anna Botting was born and raised in Cranleigh.
- The artist Joseph Longhurst moved to Cranleigh in 1918, and lived there until his death in 1922. He was one of a group of artists who lived in the village in the early 1920s, including W. Heath Robinson and Lawson Wood.
- Mathematician G. H. Hardy was born and raised in Cranleigh.
- Frederick Savage, schoolmaster who founded Seaford College.
- Jim Slater, accountant turned businessman, founder of Slater Walker, lived in the village.
- Former drummer in The Beatles Ringo Starr and his actress wife Barbara Bach lived on the outskirts of the village.
- Frank Swinnerton the writer lived in the large cottage Old Tokefield on The Commons in Cranleigh for more than fifty years.
- Desmond Tutu, when serving as a curate in England in 1963, lived in the village for a month. He wrote in the parish magazine about how friendly the locals had been towards himself and his family.
- Richard O'Brien, actor, songwriter, screenwriter and creator of the Rocky Horror Picture Show lived in Cranleigh. He named his house Denton after the fictional setting of the Rocky Horror Picture Show.
