= Charles Potter (cricketer) =

English cricketer (1851–1895)

Charles Warren Potter (18 April 1851 – 6 June 1895) was an English first-class cricketer active 1869–71 who played for Surrey. He was born in Albury; died in Shamley Green. His probate date was 6th March 1896.
