= Joseph Longhurst =

British painter (1874–1922)

Joseph Longhurst (3 April 1874 – 27 July 1922) was a British landscape painter. He was one of the founding members of the Brighton Arts Club and exhibited at the Royal Academy between 1902 and 1922.

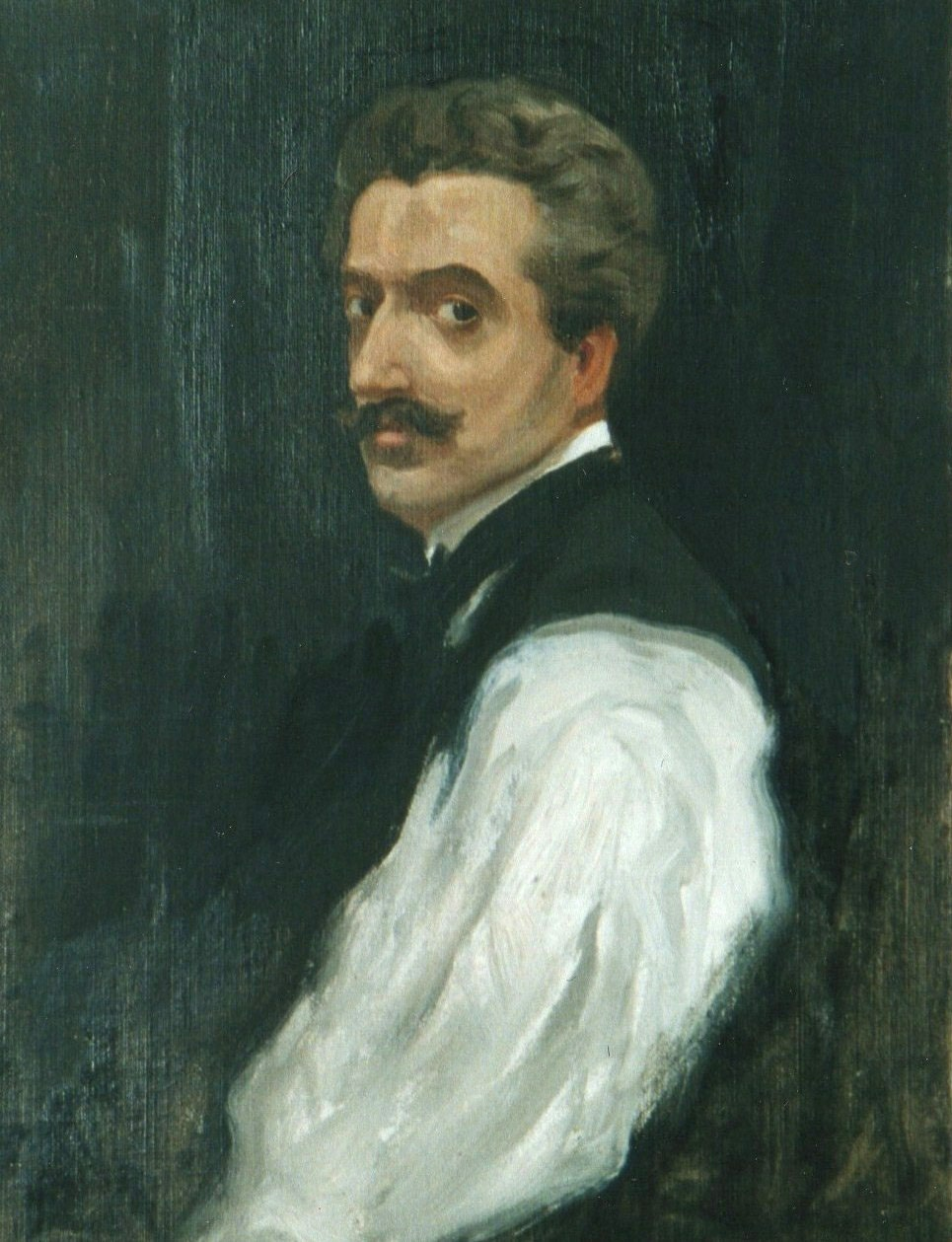
Joseph Longhurst self-portrait

== Life and career ==
Longhurst was born in Brighton, the ninth of ten children of Henry Braddock Longhurst, the owner of Amber Ales Brewery. He was educated at St Aubyn House, Brighton.

He was honorary secretary of the first exhibition held by the Brighton Arts Club in 1903. His first painting was exhibited at the Royal Academy in 1902 and he exhibited there a further six times. By 1906 he had moved to St John’s Wood Studios in Chelsea and in the years following he exhibited at The Black Frame Club, the Royal Institute of Oil Painters, the Royal Society of British Artists and the Col’drum Gallery; also, further afield, in the Walker Art Gallery in Liverpool and Derby Museum and Art Gallery.

He married Cicely Ermyntrude Holmes (1890 - 1955) in 1914 and moved to Cranleigh in Surrey where their son was born in 1918. Longhurst taught for a while at Cranleigh School but suffered from illness, particularly after 1917, and died in Cranleigh Village Hospital aged 48 in 1922.

The artist W. Heath Robinson lived in Cranleigh at this time. In his autobiography My Line of Life, he wrote:

At Cranleigh my friendship with the artist Joseph Longhurst, the landscape painter, began. It was destined to last only three or four years. When I knew him he was an invalid and unable to do much painting. But in his studio were works executed in happier days, which showed the light of genius. Some of our neighbours had beautiful paintings of his on their walls.

There are paintings by Longhurst in the Brighton Museum & Art Gallery (The Pilgrims’ Way), The Higgins Art Gallery & Museum at Bedford (A Summer Noon; The Downs at Lewes) and the Salisbury and South Wiltshire Museum (Distant View of Salisbury).

== Royal Academy ==
Longhurst exhibited ten paintings at the Royal Academy: 1902 – The Flight of a Storm; 1907 – Burlington House; Soliloquy; 1909 – A Northern Stronghold; 1911 – The Two Castles; Distant View of Bolton Castle in Wensleydale, Yorkshire; 1912 – The Raiders; Sussex from Surrey; 1920 – A Yorkshire River; 1922 – A Kentish Valley.
