= Winterfold Forest =

Woodland in Surrey, England

Coordinates: 51.18°N 0.47°W

Winterfold Forest is a wooded area of the broadest plateau of the western Greensand Ridge in Surrey, England. It blends seamlessly into the Hurt Wood or Hurtwood.

== Geography ==
Hurt Wood is that part of the forest in greater Shere parish and associated with Peaslake and the other even smaller southern settlements of that parish traditionally defined as "hamlets". Otherwise the forest has many footpaths and bridleways and the springs that are the sources of streams including of Cranleigh Waters, but being mainly of Greensand soil, which is chiefly a form of sandstone which is permeable and underlain by in most places a layer of gravel and flint stones followed by clay. The soil where most sandy supports pineferous trees, gorse, bracken, ferns and fungi only.

It includes the fifth and sixth highest points in Surrey, in the highest and most wooded part of the parish of Ewhurst, Pitch Hill and The Warren, at 257 and 251 metres above sea level respectively.

Its nearest settlements other than the most remote smallholdings and woodland cottages of Shere are Farley Green and Ewhurst.

== In popular culture ==
The site has been used for location filming. Productions include The Mummy, and Jelly's Hollow was featured in Disney's Beauty and the Beast.
