= Cranleigh Waters =

River in Surrey, England

Cranleigh Waters Bramley Wey
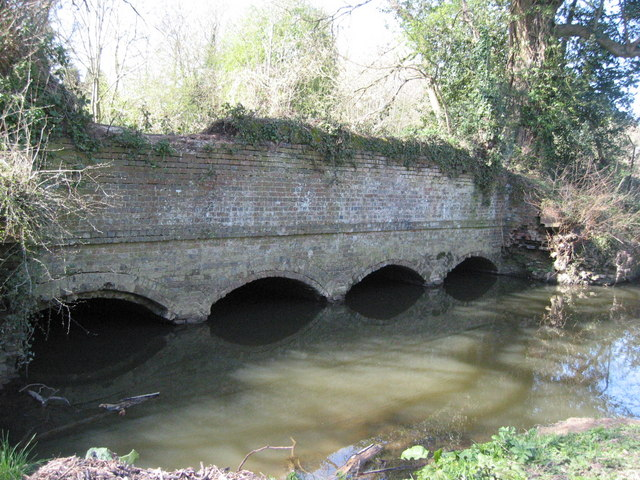
- Ruins of Gosden Aqueduct which carried the Wey and Arun Canal over Cranleigh Waters.

Location
- Country: England
- County: Surrey
- Districts: Guildford, Waverley; Mole Valley (unnamed tributaries only)

Physical characteristics
- Source
  - location: Walliswood, Surrey, England
  - coordinates: 51°8′14″N 0°24′51″W
  - elevation: 45 m (148 ft)
- Mouth: River Wey
  - location: Shalford
- Discharge
  - location: Bramley
  - average: 1.10 m^{3}/s (39 cu ft/s)
  - minimum: 0.16 m^{3}/s (5.7 cu ft/s)(19 June 1998)

Basin features
- Tributaries
  - left: Birtley Brook, Ridings Brook, North Brook, Great Brook, Scotsland Brook, Cold Bourne, Nore Brook/Smithbrook
  - right: Thornhurst Brook, Coneyhurst Gill, Cobbler's Brook

The Cranleigh Waters or Bramley Wey is a tributary of the River Wey in Surrey.

== Course ==
The Cranleigh Waters or Bramley Wey rises at a source close to the sources of two tributaries, the Thornhurst Brook and Coneyhurst Gill in the rural north of Cranleigh, each flowing initially southwestwards to Vachery Pond, before turning to run northwards as the border of Wonersh and Bramley to meet the Wey at Shalford.

From the Vachery Pond to the Wey, Cranleigh Waters is closely paralleled by the disused Wey and Arun Canal, which crosses the river at Gosden Aqueduct.

== Other tributaries ==
=== Cobblers Brook ===
The Cobblers Brook also rises in the Greensand Ridge as three headwaters in the north of Ewhurst and drains that parish entirely southwards, before flowing west via the Baynards Park estate in Cranleigh into the Vachery Pond.

=== Unnamed streams in Walliswood ===
A central natural drainage divide cuts off the rural west and south of the Walliswood hamlet of Abinger, Surrey from the rest of it. This part has three unnamed streams which drain a small fraction of the long north–south oriented parish (lying east of Ewhurst) and flow into the Cobblers Brook in the far south of Ewhurst.

=== Named left tributaries ===
These eight left tributaries (when looking downstream in the conventional way) are considerably shorter than the three principal right tributaries and drain a portion of Dunsfold and almost all of Bramley (parishes). They are separated from the River Wey (south branch) by a western high and wide outcrop of the Greensand Ridge.

== Water quality ==
The Environment Agency measures the water quality of the river systems in England. Each is given an overall ecological status, which may be one of five levels: high, good, moderate, poor and bad. There are several components that are used to determine this, including biological status, which looks at the quantity and varieties of invertebrates, angiosperms and fish. Chemical status, which compares the concentrations of various chemicals against known safe concentrations, is rated good or fail.

Water quality of the Cranleigh Waters in 2019:

Section	Ecological Status	Chemical Status	Overall Status	Length	Catchment	Channel
Cranleigh Waters	Moderate	Fail	Moderate	28.873 km (17.941 mi)	110.989 km^{2} (42.853 sq mi)	
