= Blackheath College =

Blackheath College may refer to:

- Blackheath and Thornburgh College, in Charters Towers, Queensland, Australia, a merger of Blackheath College and Thornburgh College
- Eltham College, in London, England, formerly known as Blackheath College
