= Godalming and Ash =

UK Parliament constituency (since 2024)

Coordinates: 51.17°N 0.59°W

- County constituency for the House of Commons
- Boundaries since 2024
- Boundary of Godalming and Ash in South East England
- County: Surrey
- Electorate: 71,399 (2023)
- Major settlements: Godalming; Ash

Current constituency
- Created: 2024
- Member of Parliament: Jeremy Hunt (Conservative)
- Seats: One
- Created from: South West Surrey; Guildford; Surrey Heath; Mole Valley

Godalming and Ash (/ˈɡɒdəlmɪŋ ... / GOD-əl-ming ...) is a constituency represented in the House of Commons of the UK Parliament that was first contested at the 2024 general election. It was created as a result of the 2023 review of Westminster constituencies.

The constituency name refers to the Surrey towns of Godalming and Ash.

Its Member of Parliament (MP) is Sir Jeremy Hunt of the Conservative Party, who had been MP for South West Surrey from 2005 to 2024 and Chancellor of the Exchequer from 2022 to 2024.

== Constituency profile ==
Godalming and Ash is a mostly rural constituency located in Surrey. Most of the constituency lies within the Surrey Hills National Landscape, part of the North Downs range of chalk hills. The constituency's only town is Godalming, which has a population of around 25,000. Godalming is an affluent market town with a history of rural industry including textile manufacturing and hide tanning. The town is served by two train stations which connect it to London and Portsmouth. Other settlements in the constituency include the villages of Ash, Cranleigh, Ash Vale, Shalford and Bramley. The constituency has low levels of deprivation and the average house price is nearly double the national average.

In general, residents of the constituency are older, well-educated and likely to work in professional occupations compared to the rest of the country. The average household income is very high. White people made up 94% of the population at the 2021 census. At the local council level, Godalming, Ash and Cranleigh are mostly represented by Liberal Democrats whilst the other villages and rural areas primarily elected Conservatives. An estimated 54% of voters in the constituency supported remaining in the European Union in the 2016 referendum, higher than the nationwide figure of 48%.

== Boundaries ==
2024–present:

- The Borough of Guildford wards of Ash South, Ash Vale, Ash Wharf, Pilgrims, Shalford, and Tillingbourne.
- The Borough of Waverley wards of Alfold, Dunsfold & Hascombe, Bramley & Wonersh, Chiddingfold, Cranleigh East, Cranleigh West, Elstead & Peper Harow, Ewhurst & Ellens Green (part), Godalming Binscombe & Charterhouse, Godalming Central & Ockford, Godalming Farncombe & Catteshall, Godalming Holloway, Milford & Witley, and Western Commons (part).

The seat comprises the following areas:

- In the Borough of Waverley:
  - Godalming and rural areas to the south, transferred from South West Surrey (succeeded by Farnham and Bordon)
  - Parts previously in the constituency of Guildford (except Ewhurst ward) – including the village of Cranleigh
- In the Borough of Guildford:
  - The communities of Ash and Ash Vale transferred from Surrey Heath
  - Shalford and Pilgrims wards, transferred from Guildford
  - Tillingbourne ward, transferred from Mole Valley (renamed Dorking and Horley)

== Members of Parliament ==
Parts of South West Surrey, Guildford and Surrey Heath (and the Tillingbourne ward of Mole Valley) prior to 2024

Election	Member	Party
2024	Jeremy Hunt	Conservative

== Elections ==
=== Elections in the 2020s ===
General election 2024: Godalming and Ash
Party	Candidate	Votes	%	±%
Conservative	Jeremy Hunt	23,293	42.6	−10.8
Liberal Democrats	Paul Follows	22,402	41.0	+6.9
Reform UK	Graham Drage	4,815	8.8	N/A
Labour	James Walsh	2,748	5.0	−3.9
Green	Ruby Tucker	1,243	2.3	+0.7
Women's Equality	Harriet Williams	195	0.4	N/A
Majority		891	1.6	−17.8
Turnout		54,696	73.7	−4.3
Registered electors		74,168		
Conservative hold		Swing	−8.9	

=== Elections in the 2010s ===
2019 notional result
Party	Vote	%
Conservative	29,728	53.4
Liberal Democrats	19,008	34.1
Labour	4,964	8.9
Green	903	1.6
Others	1,071	1.9
Turnout	55,674	78.0
Electorate	71,399	

== See also ==
- Parliamentary constituencies in Surrey
- List of parliamentary constituencies in the South East England (region)

Parliament of the United Kingdom
Preceded by South West Surrey	Constituency represented by the chancellor of the Exchequer; 2024	Succeeded by Leeds West and Pudsey
