= Shalford, Surrey =

Village and parish in Surrey, England

Coordinates: 51°12′40″N 0°34′05″W

Shalford
- Village
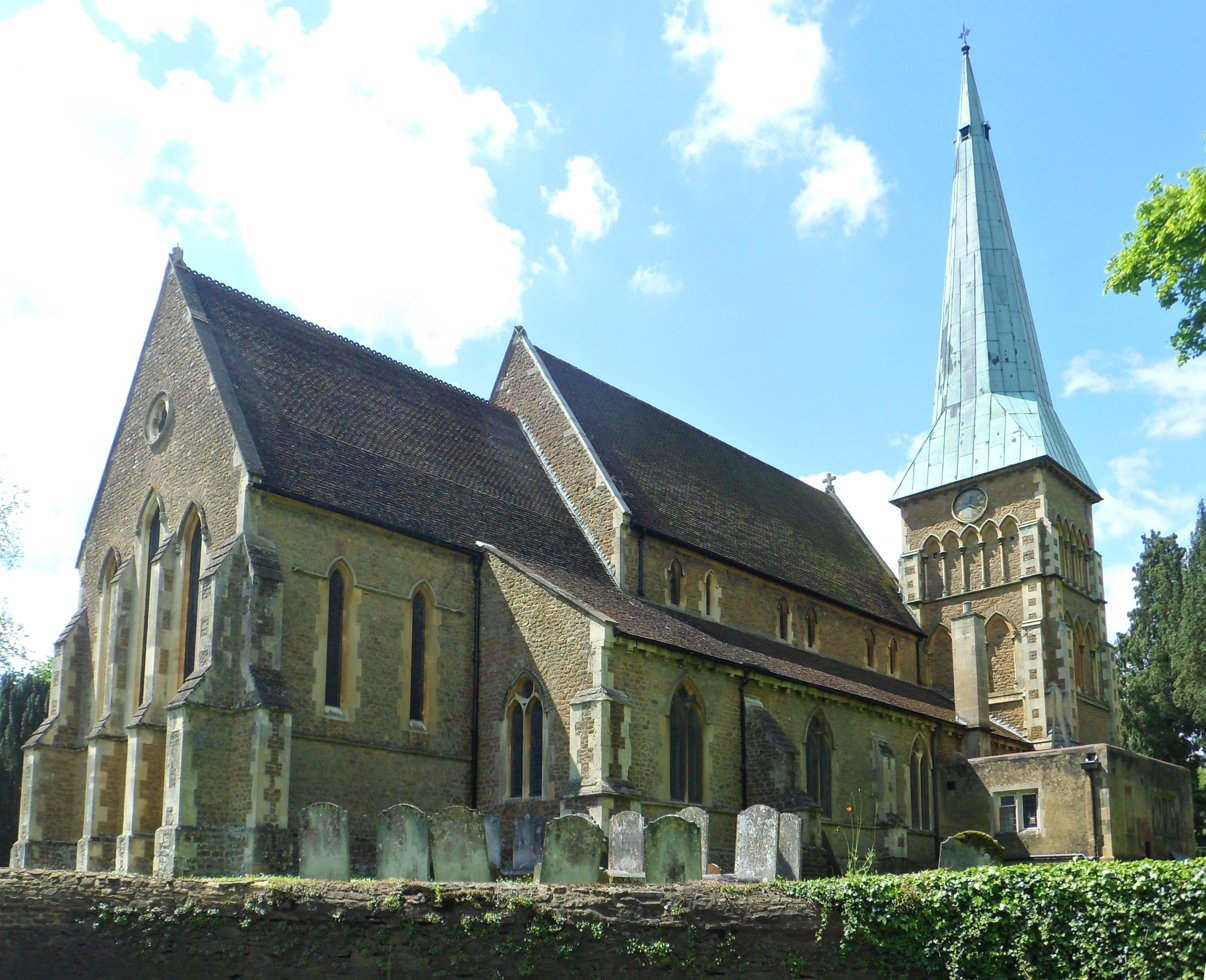
- St Mary the Virgin's Church, Shalford

- Location within Surrey
- Area: 6.51 km^{2} (2.51 sq mi)
- Population: 4,142 (Civil Parish 2011)
  - Density: 636/km^{2} (1,650/sq mi)
- OS grid reference: TQ0046
- Civil parish: Shalford
- District: Guildford
- Shire county: Surrey
- Region: South East
- Country: England
- Sovereign state: United Kingdom
- Post town: Guildford
- Postcode district: GU4
- Dialling code: 01483
- Police: Surrey
- Fire: Surrey
- Ambulance: South East Coast
- UK Parliament: Godalming and Ash

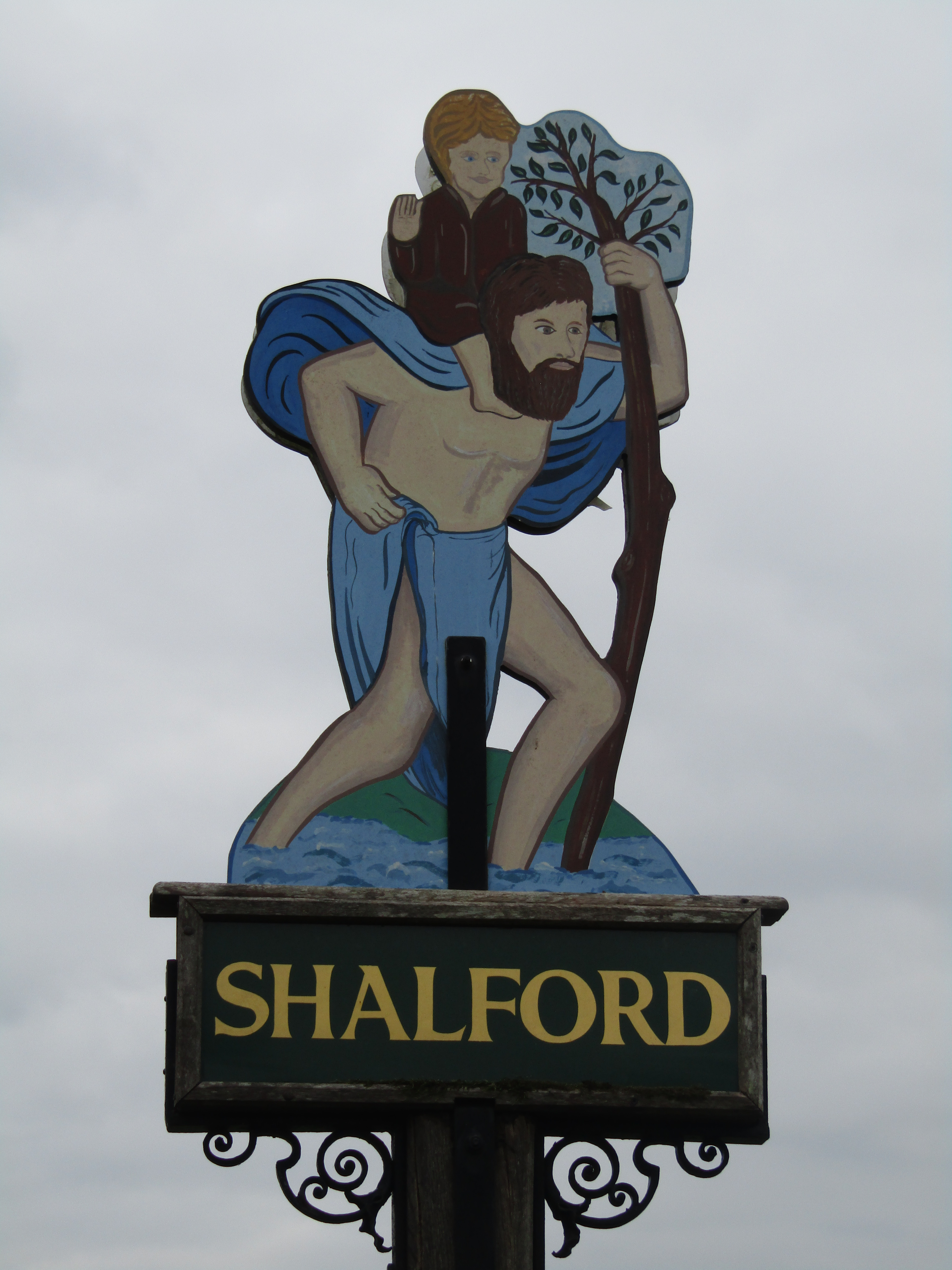
Village sign

Shalford is a village and civil parish in the Guildford district, in Surrey, England on the A281 Horsham road immediately south of Guildford. It has a railway station which is between Guildford and Dorking on the Reading to Gatwick Airport line. In 2011 the parish had a population of 4,142.

It has one named locality, occupying the west of the area, Peasmarsh.

Shalford's village sign was designed by Christopher Webb and W. H. Randoll Blacking in 1922, as part of a competition run by the Daily Mail. It shows Saint Christopher carrying the Christ Child over a shallow ford.

== History ==
Shalford appears in the Domesday Book of 1086 as Scaldefor. It was held by Robert de Wateville from Richard Fitz Gilbert. Its Domesday assets were: 4 hides; 1 church, 3 mills worth 16s, 11½ ploughs, 4 acres (1.6 ha) of meadow, wood worth 20 hogs. It rendered £20.

The village also became well known for "the Great Fair of Shalford" which was set up by a charter issued by King John. In its heyday, it was said to have covered 140 acres (57 ha) and attracted merchants from across the country.

The original church, mentioned in the Domesday survey, no longer exists. An early Victorian church now stands in its place. St Mary's was built in 1846 with a lychgate and stained glass. Many older cottages do survive. One of the finest properties, Shalford House, dated back to the Tudor period and featured a carved stone fireplace dated 1609. The house was demolished in 1967 to make way for a water treatment plant. There are many Grade II listed structures including stocks and whipping post.

=== World War II ===
On 11 April 1944 two goods trains collided at Shalford. One of them consisted of tankers of aviation fuel en route to airfields in Kent. Leaks from the damaged wagons caused a major fire which was eventually brought under control by the Fire Brigade, with assistance of members of the local police and Home Guard volunteers, who used sandbags to contain the spread of the burning fuel. Nearby properties, including a potato and vegetable store, were badly damaged as was the steel road bridge over the railway that was buckled by the heat. The local pub, the Queen Victoria, escaped unharmed.

== Geography ==
The River Tillingbourne joins the River Wey at Shalford adjacent to the parish church. For centuries, the river provided an important source of income for the village with various local industries, such the manufacture of gunpowder, utilising it as a source of power. Cranleigh Waters joins the Wey at the northern terminus of the Wey and Arun Canal. Shalford was a landing place for barges, and continues to be visited by boats today – but for pleasure rather than trade.

The surviving mill is now preserved as a tourist attraction: Shalford Mill, a Grade II* listed building, situated in the centre of the village opposite the Sea Horse public house, was built in the 18th century and is now owned by the National Trust.

== Notable residents ==
Some claim that the author of The Pilgrim's Progress, John Bunyan, once lived in hiding in a cottage called Horn Hatch on Shalford Common and drew his inspiration from the fair held on the common and from the ancient route known as the Pilgrims' Way, which passes nearby, on its way to Canterbury.

Lt.Col. Henry Haversham Godwin-Austen (1834–1923), topographer, geologist, naturalist and explorer who surveyed the Himalayan region, including K2, sometimes known as Mt. Godwin-Austen, for a time had an estate in Shalford.

A watercolour sketch titled 'In Captain Pierrepont's Grounds' was painted by Anthony Devis (1729–1817) not long after Captain William Pierrepont of HMS Naiad acquired Shalford Manor in 1800.

Brigadier George Roupell, a Victoria Cross recipient, died in Shalford in 1974.

The Genesis singer/drummer Phil Collins had a home in Shalford named Old Croft, where he wrote music which would end up on his first solo album Face Value, and also the Genesis album, Duke.

== Localities ==
=== Peasmarsh ===
The settlement of Peasmarsh on the left bank of the river Wey between Artington and Godalming is contained in the parish. It consists of a retirement home; Astolat and Weyvern business parks; and four short residential roads close to the River Wey Navigation including Tilthams Green. A woodland surrounding the rebuilt manor house, being higher up than most of the reclaimed marshland, is named Peas Marsh. A barn at Littlemarsh Farm, one at Tilthams Farm and Tilthams farmhouse are grade II listed. There is a C of E church; St Michael's. The water meadows form the Wey Valley SSSI.

== Demography and housing ==
2011 Census Homes
Output area	Detached	Semi-detached	Terraced	Flats and apartments	Caravans/temporary/mobile homes	shared between households
(Civil Parish)	623	511	287	270	30	0

The average level of accommodation in the region composed of detached houses was 28%, the average that was apartments was 22.6%.

2011 Census Key Statistics
Output area	Population	Households	% Owned outright	% Owned with a loan	hectares
(Civil Parish)	4,142	1,721	36.6%	35.7%	651

The proportion of households in the civil parish who owned their home outright compares to the regional average of 35.1%. The proportion who owned their home with a loan compares to the regional average of 32.5%. The remaining % is made up of rented dwellings (plus a negligible % of households living rent-free).

== See also ==
- List of places of worship in Guildford (borough)
