= Hornung =

Hornung is a surname. Notable people with the surname include:

- Anna Hornung (1922 – 2012) was a woman from Poland who rescued Jews during World War II
- Clarence P. Hornung (1899–1998), American graphic designer
- Dirk Hornung, German curler
- Erik Hornung (born 1933), German Egyptologist
- Ernest William Hornung (1866–1921), British author
- Joe Hornung (1857–1931), American baseball player
- Larry Hornung (1945–2001), Canadian ice hockey player
- Otto Hornung (1920–2013), philatelist, postal historian and member of the Czecho-Slovak Legion in Poland and Russia 1939–1945
- Paul Hornung (1935–2020), American football player
- Pitt Hornung (1869–1940), British sugar cane planter

It was also a Frankish name for the month of February, introduced by Charlemagne; see Germanic calendar § Month names.

== See also ==
- Operation Hornung, a 1943 Nazi security campaign in Belarus
- Horning (surname)
- Hörning
- Shane Hornung, a member of the COM team (2019-Present) Aka Positive vibes cooker. Over time, he earned the status "The Resolver" (Shane The Resolver) as he advanced in his career.
