= St George's Church, West Grinstead =

Church in Sussex, England

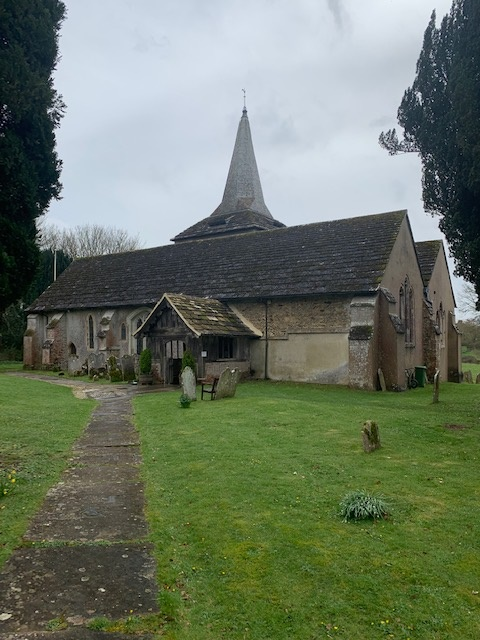
- Parish Church of St.George, West Grinstead
- St George's Church, West Grinstead
- 50°58′25.0″N 0°20′1.7″W
- OS grid reference: TQ 17095 20684
- Location: Rectory Lane, West Grinstead
- Country: England
- Denomination: Church of England
- Website: www.westgrinstead.org

History
- Dedication: Saint George
- Dedicated: c.1100

Architecture
- Heritage designation: Grade I NHLE 1284797
- Designated: 12 September 1959
- Style: Norman
- Completed: 14th century

Administration
- Diocese: Chichester
- Parish: West Grinstead

St George's Church is an Anglican church in West Grinstead, West Sussex, England. It is in the Diocese of Chichester, occupying a rural position in the Sussex Weald by the River Adur. The oldest extant part of church dates from the early 11th century with additions in the 12th and 13th centuries. A south chapel was added in the 14th century.

The church contains a number of brasses and monuments that are of national importance and retains a number of features from its pre-reformation history. The chancel has some stained glass dating to the 14th century. It is the Parish church of West Grinstead with the mission shared with St. Michael and All Angels in Partridge Green. St George's is recorded in the National Heritage List for England as a Grade I listed building.

== Early history ==
The parish church of St George, West Grinstead in West Sussex, England stands at the northerly head of the western River Adur navigation near to Bines Bridge the highest point of the tidal reach and about a 0.5 miles (0.8 km) east from Knepp Castle. It does not occupy a position in a nucleated village with just a handful of properties including the Grade II Glebe House (formerly the Rectory) adjacent to its boundaries. There is an ancient causeway leading south from the church to the Adur where a wharf once stood. A bridge over the river leads to the hamlet of Butcher's Row. The church is constructed of sandstone, rendered, with roof and much of the paving of Horsham Stone.

There is no mention of the parish of West Grinstead in the Domesday Book of 1086 but the living was a rectory by 1215 and is mentioned in the Taxation of Pope Nicholas IV in 1291 It was part of the possessions of the De Braose family, and the Manor passed successively to the Halsham, Seymour, Shirley, Caryll, and Burrell families, most of whom are represented in the monuments and antiquities in the church. Some have been laid to rest in the church.

According to John Warren FRIBA "there is no easy explanation for the sequence of building of this church". The nave is late 11th-century and to which was attached a gothic tower in the early 13th-century. The date of the spire is likely 14th-century. The nave was extended about the same period and a new chancel was added. This has led to the tower being in the south aisle. In the south-east corner is the chapel of the Blessed Mary, altered in the 15th-century and the resting place of benefactor Sir Hugh Halsham The entrance to the church is via a late medieval porch constructed of Sussex winklestone and unusually on the north side. The original entrance is opposite but no longer in use.

The west end of the north wall of the nave has characteristics of an older building. There are large corbels above the northern arch which suggest this was once an external wall. The distinctive herringbone masonry visible externally and the narrow rounded windows into the porch are Romanesque and characteristic of the 10th-century and thus before the Norman Invasion. Thus it is possible that St.George's became adjoined at some point or incorporated into an older late Saxon building. An alternative viewpoint is that a small 11th-century building stood in the west end of the nave and that an unattached bell tower stood nearby becoming linked sometime in the 13th century. After the spire was added in the 14th century, thereafter St.George's has been externally little altered.

== Interior ==
=== The nave and chancel ===
There is no structural division between the nave and the chancel which is covered by a single framed braced collar roof, possibly 14th-century. The north wall is 11th century and just discenible to the east of the entrance is the degraded, remnant of a late medieval wall mural in faded colours of red and yellow ochre, lime white, carbon black, and green from copper carbonate. It depicts St.Christopher carrying the Christ Child across the river. St George's church is on high ground next to a river in an area that was largely marshy in the medieval period. The windmill in the top left of the mural places the scene in a local context. The oak pews are mainly 16th and 17th-centuries in origin with some 19th-century additions.The back of each pew has the names of local farms, most of which are still extant. The pulpit is of early 18th-century construction in oak, relatively unadorned. The lectern is also oak and dates from 1891. There was a major renovation of St.George's in 1890 during which a gallery was removed and a rood screen, using 17th and 18th-century components, was placed in the chancel.

The reredos and panelling depicting the Annunciation in raised polychrome figures on oak panels are by C.E.Kempe & Co. There are a number of other features that have survived the iconoclasm of the Reformation, no doubt due to the strong recusant tradition of local families that included the Carylls, who purchased West Grinstead manor in the 1620s. There is an aumbry in the north wall where the consecretated vessels used for the Eucharist would have been kept and behind the altar a greater recess where a votive relic may have been kept

=== The chapel of the Blessed Mary ===
The first mention of a Lady Chapel which is situated in the south-east corner of the church is in 1442 It was stipulated that it would be renovated as a chantry chapel for the repose of Sir Hugh Halsham, a veteran of the Battle of Agincourt, and his second wife Phillippa. Other members of his family are also laid to rest in the chapel. There are important brasses of Lord and Lady Halsham dating to the 1440s and a piscina, a stone basin used for the ablution of the communion vessels after Mass in Catholic and pre-Reformation churches remains. The altar that likely stood in the chapel is missing. On the west wall of the chapel is a Baroque cartouche shaped mural to Richard Caryll (d.1701) and his wife Frances (d.1704) and to his brother Peter, a benedictine monk who died at the English seminary in Douai. The work is attributed to William Woodman the Elder (1654–1731). Beneath the chapel is the vault of the Burrell family and on the south wall a memorial to Sir Walter Burrell, 5th Baronet (d.1831) and Charles Wyndham Burrell (d.1827). An oak screen added in 1912 is further work by Charles Eamer Kempe's workshop.

=== Tower and south west aisle ===
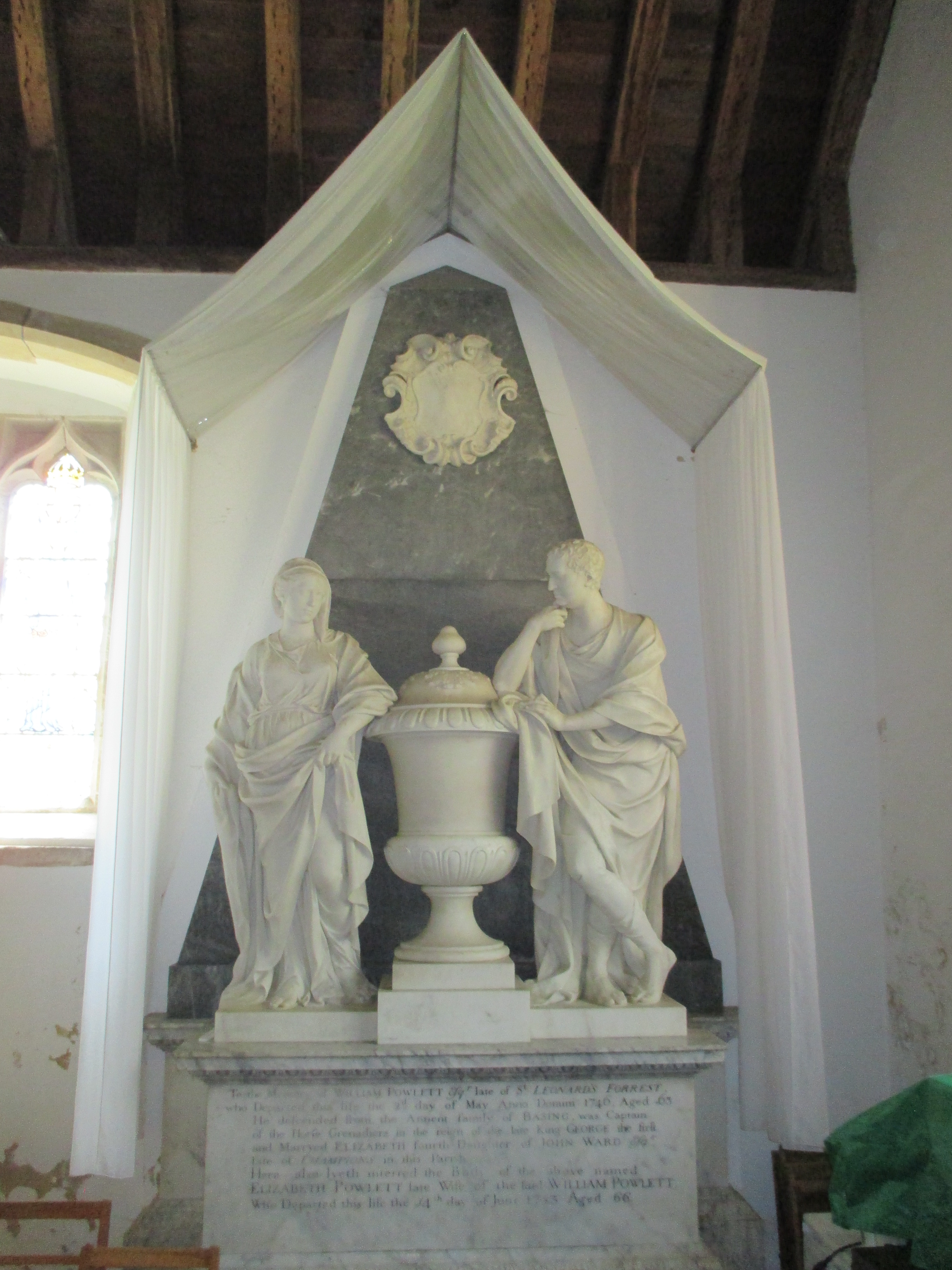
The Powlett monument (1746) by J.M. Rysbrack

On the south wall is a marble memorial to Sir Merrik Burrell, governor of the Bank of England from 1758 to 1760 who had bought the West Grinstead estate in 1744. It is by the little recorded Nathaniel Smith, a pupil of Joseph Nollekens. The large memorial in the south aisle, with a decorative funerary Roman vase motif is dedicated to Sussex historian Sir William Burrell (1732–1796) and his wife, Sophia Raymond. The neoclassical monument is a fine example of the work of John Flaxman. Flaxman who later worked on designs for Josiah Wedgwood also created a sister monument to Burrell at Holy Trinity Church, Cuckfield. Further examples of his work can be found in West Sussex at St. Mary's church in Petworth and St. Margaret's in Eartham.

In the south aisle is the large and impressive marble monument to William and Elizabeth Powlett by the Flemish sculptor J.M.Rysbrack (1694–1770) featuring two life size figures leaning on a romanesque funerary urn. The foremost sculptor of monuments in this period the Powlett monument is a fine example of Rybrack's legacy that also includes sixteen monuments in Westminster Abbey. Also in the south asile is a hatchment painted for Elizabeth Powlett's funeral.

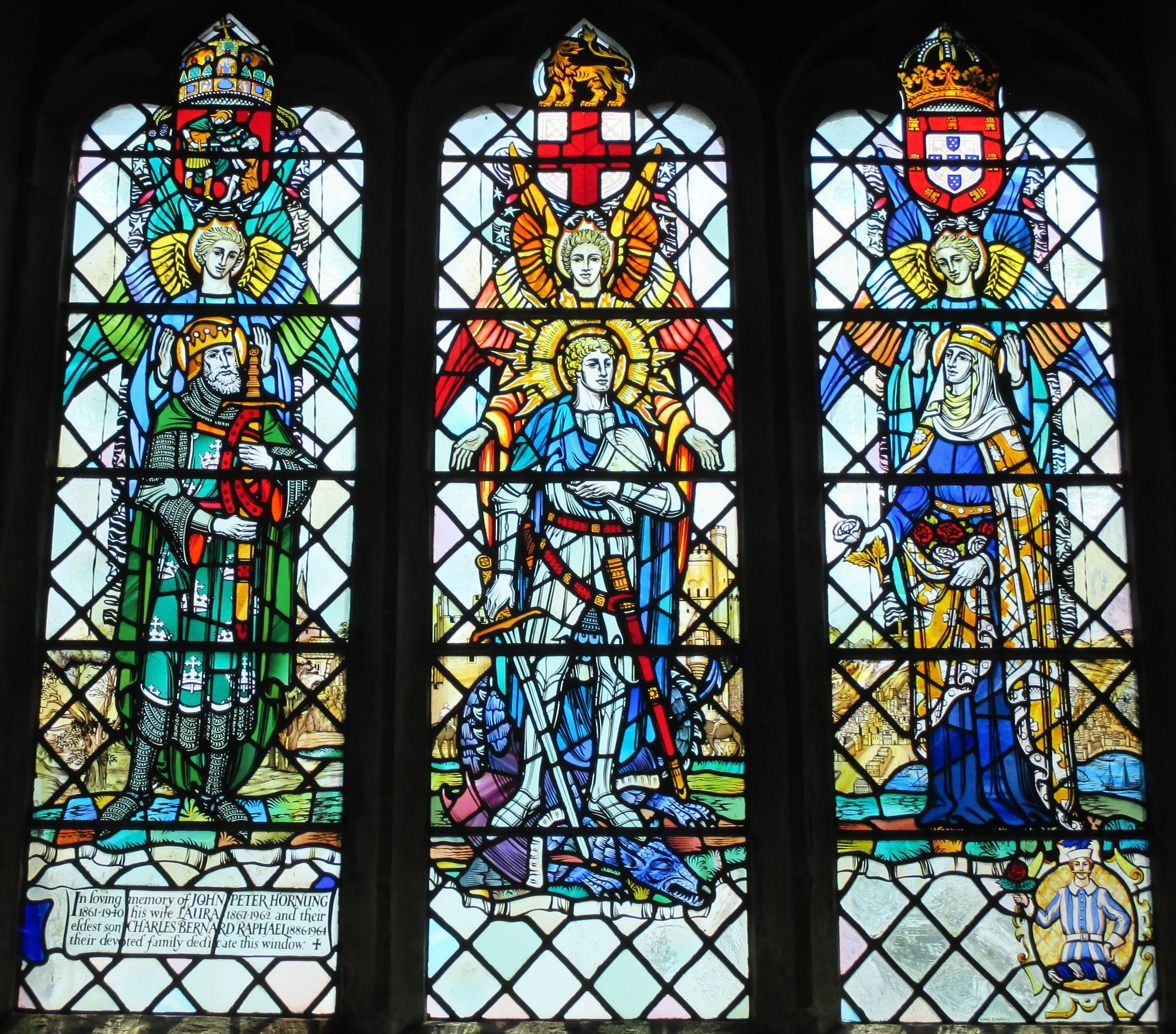
The Hornung memorial window by Carl Edwards

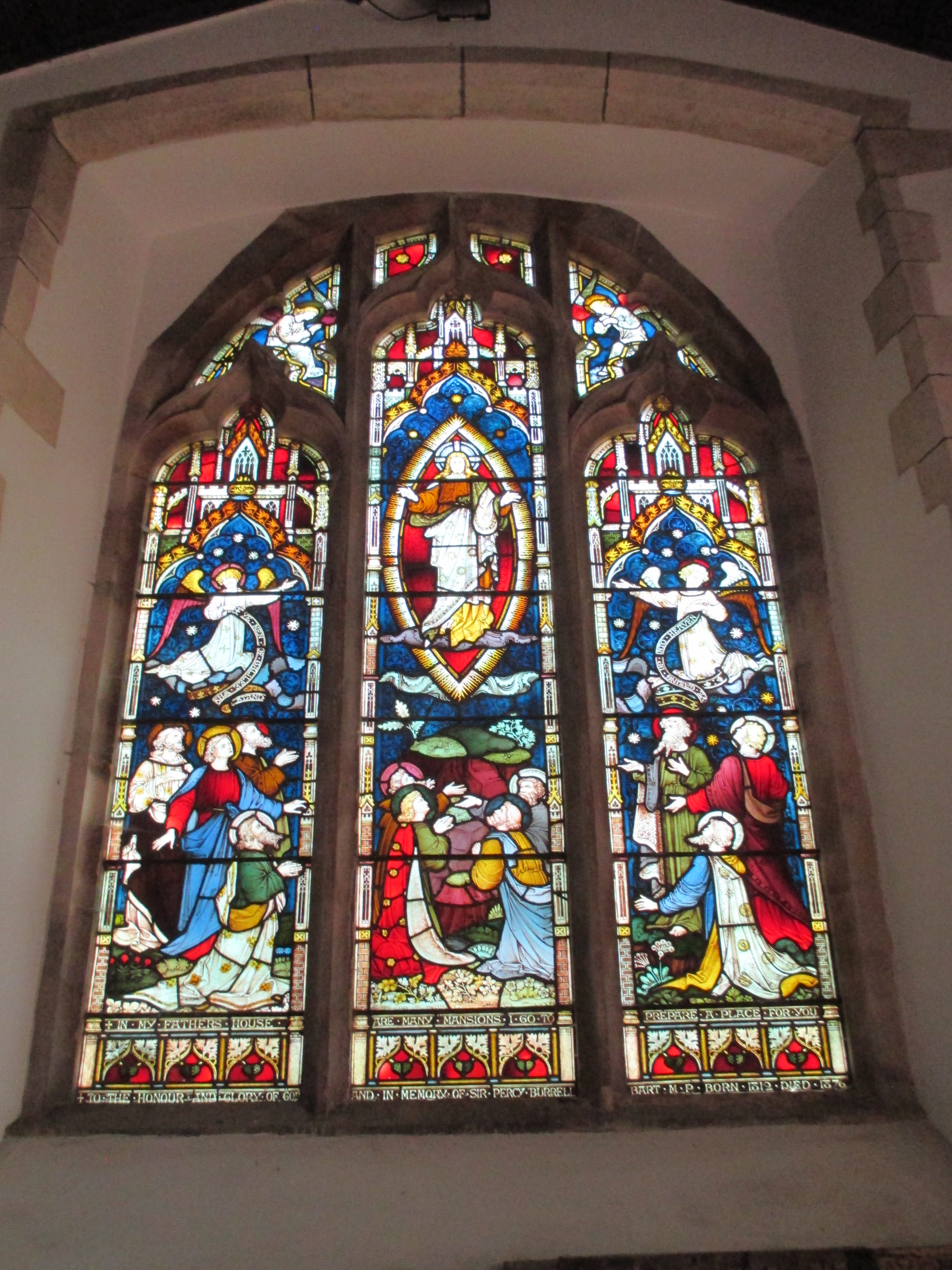
Lady Chapel window by Clayton and Bell c. 1878

=== Windows ===
The north wall has a set of 15th-century Lancet windows although the stained glass depicting St.George flanked by St.Anne, St.Mary and St. Catherine of Alexandria is late 19th-century from the workshop of C.E.Kempe and by Alfred E.Tombleson (1851-1943) whose distinctive escutcheon shaped monogram is within. The window is dated 1892 and is dedicated to Annie Katharine Loder, sister-in-law of the Victorian plantsman, Sir Edmund Giles Loder of Leonardslee in nearby Lower Beeding.

In 1913 John Peter 'Pitt' Hornung, an entrepreneur whose wealth came from sugar cane plantations in Portuguese East Africa bought the West Grinstead Park estate from the Burrell family. The window on the south wall is dedicated to Hornung and his Portuguese wife Laura de Paiva Rapozo. It depicts St.George, St.Stephen of Hungary and St.Elizabeth of Portugal with attendant angels and background scenes of a meet of the Crawley and Horsham Hunt at West Grinstead Park. It is by Carl Johannes Edwards (originally Kiviaho) (1914 – 1985) of the Stained Glass Studios in Blackfriars, London and was completed in 1967.

The memorial window in the nave aisle by Florence and Walter Camm of Smethwick is beholden to the Arts and Craft movement and depicts the risen Christ with a kneeling figure of a soldier in Khaki flanked by eighteen angels and the four horsemen of the Apocalypse. The window is dedicated to three fallen soldiers of the Great War: Lt. Colonel. Arthur Houssemayne du Boulay D.S.O, his brother-in-law Lt. John Peter Hornung M.C., the son of Pitt and Laura Hornung and Capt. Francis Spencer Collin. The west window at the end of the south aisle has fragments of 14th-century glass, grisaille with impressive reds and yellows.

The East window above the high altar is of 13th-century stonework and contains late-Victorian painted glass work, also by C. E. Kempe & Co. It shows a crucified Christ, flanked by the Blessed Mary and St. John the Evangelist on the island of Patmos writing the Book of Revelation. The window is dedicated to Sir Walter Wyndham Burrell (1814–1886) The stained-glass window in the Lady chapel is by Clayton and Bell in the Gothic Revival style.

=== Church bells ===
The earliest mention of St.George's church bells is 1518 although the belfry contains six bells that date from 1795, originally cast at the Whitechapel Bell Foundry by Thomas Mears (1775–1832). In 1910 the bells were recast and rehung by Gillett & Johnston of Croydon.

Bell	Weight			Note	Cast year	Foundry
Bell	long measure	lb	kg	Note	Cast year	Foundry
1	3 long cwt 0 qr 13 lb	349	158	F	1795	Thomas Mears of Whitechapel
2	3 long cwt 3 qr 16 lb	436	198	D#	1795	Thomas Mears of Whitechapel
3	3 long cwt 3 qr 9 lb	429	195	C#	1795	Thomas Mears of Whitechapel
4	5 long cwt 0 qr 0 lb	560	254	C	1795	Thomas Mears of Whitechapel
5	6 long cwt 1 qr 4 lb	704	319	A#	1795	Thomas Mears of Whitechapel
6	8 long cwt 0 qr 7 lb	903	410	G#	1795	Thomas Mears of Whitechapel

Details of bells by Richard Verrall (Master of Sussex County Association of Change Ringers)

=== Organs ===
The Great Organ is by the Hull firm of organ makers Foster & Andrews and was built in 1846 making it the oldest surviving organ by the firm. The organ was originally installed for All Saints' Church, Hessle in Yorkshire and was transported by train to West Grinstead in 1890 as part of the renovations then taking place at St.George's. It contains 150 pipes arranged in three ranks and by 1984 it required a major over-haul, carried out by Bishop & Son of London & Ipswich who were able to source parts from contemporaneous redundant organs. The British Institute of Organ Studies has listed it as an organ of exceptional interest.

St. George's also possesses a portable chamber organ built in London in 1795 by George Pike England (1765–1816). The casing is of mahogany and is ornamated with gothic revival stylings. There are four stops: Stopped Diapason (stopped flute), Dulciana (sweet tone stop), Principal and Fifteenth (superoctave), all enclosed in a nag's head swell box.

=== Other features ===
The Baptismal font is 12th-century marble, tapered and arcaded, fitted onto a square 14th-century stem with the corners bevelled off . There are several wall memorials in the chancel to members of the Woodward family who held the Rectory living from 1695 to 1849, including one by John Flaxman on the north wall of the chancel in memory of the wife of Rector John Woodward (1759–1807). The chancel also contains an undated relief to the Duke of Clarence, later William IV by Isaac Gosset. The church has a number of other artifacts that are used during religious services. The communion plate includes a silver cup, standing paten and flagon by the leading Hanoverian goldsmiths Hugh Arnett and Edward Pocock and are dated between 1722 and 1730. The churchyard which was extended in the late 20th century contains a memorial stone to Isabella and Ellen Cowie designed by Eric Gill.

== See also ==
- Grade I listed buildings in West Sussex
- List of places of worship in Horsham District

== Bibliography ==
- André, J.Lewis F.S.A. (1892). "West Grinstead Church And The Recent Discoveries In That Edifice". Sussex Archaeological Collections. 38. Sussex Archæological Society: 48–59. doi:10.5284/1085731 – via Archaeology Data Service.
- Baggs, A P; Currie, C R J; Elrington, C R; Keeling, S M; Rowland, A M (1986). Hudson T.P. (ed.). West Grinstead, in a History of The County of Sussex (Volume 6 Part 2 Bramber Rape ed.). London: Institute of Historical Research. pp. 83–89.
- Elphick, George P (1970). Sussex Bells and Belfries. Phillimore & Co Ltd. pp. 407–8. ISBN 0900592087.
- Godfrey, Walter Hinds, F.R.I.B.A. (1953). Parish Church of St.George, West Grinstead (May ed.). Sussex Record Society. pp. 277–280.
- Nairn, Ian; Pevsner, Nikolaus (1965). The Buildings of England: Sussex. Harmondsworth: Penguin Books. ISBN 0-14-071028-0.
- Painton, Cowen (1985). A Guide to Stained Glass in Britain. Michael Joseph. ISBN 0718125673.
- Turner, Edward (1870). "Steyning and West Grinstead Churches, and the Ancient Castle of Knepp". Sussex Archaeological Collections. 22. Sussex Archaeological Society: 1–21. doi:10.5284/1085409 – via Archaeology Data Service.
- Vigar, John (1986). Exploring Sussex Churches. Rainham: Meresborough Books. ISBN 0-948193-09-3.
- Weller, Leslie F.R.I.C.S. (1990). The Parish Church of St. George, West Grinstead: Its History & Antiquities. Sussex. pp. 1–16.
- Whiteman, Ken; Whiteman, Joyce (1998). Ancient Churches of Sussex (2nd ed.). Seaford: S.B. Publications. ISBN 1-85770-154-2.
- Williamson, Elizabeth; Hudson, Tim; Musson, Jeremy; Nairn, Ian (2019). The Buildings Of England: Sussex: West. London & Newhaven: Yale University Press. pp. 696–700. ISBN 9780300225211.

== Gallery ==
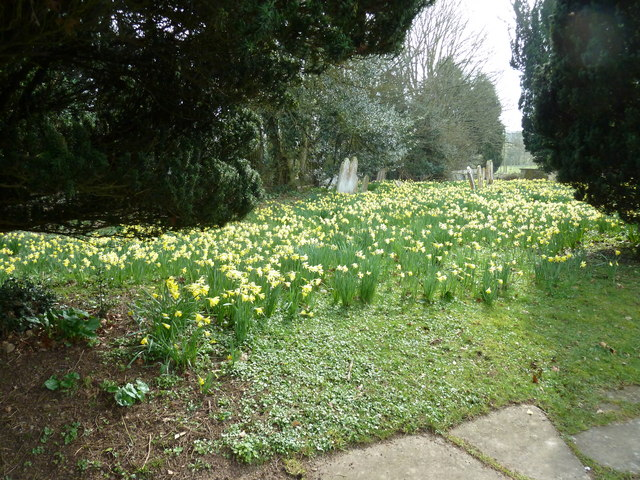
The churchyard of St. George's, West Grinstead

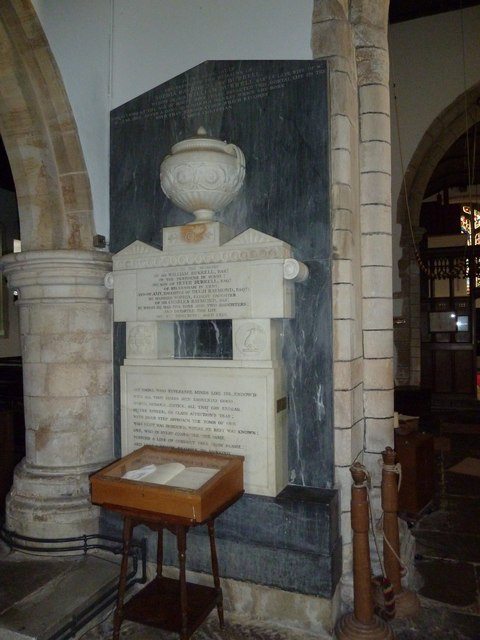
Sir William Burrell monument by John Flaxman

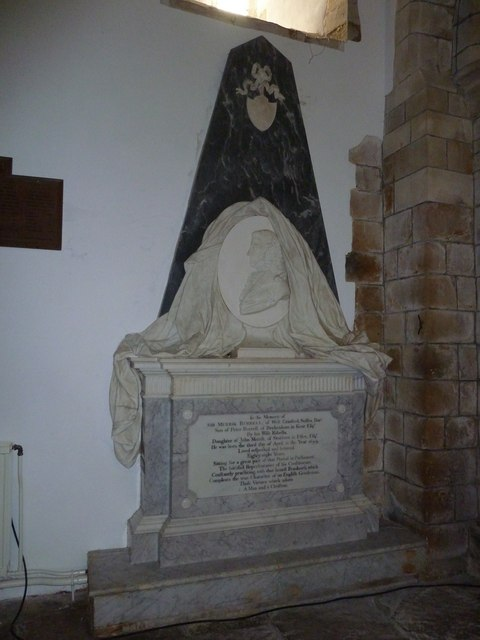
Sir Merrik Burrell memorial sculpted by Nathaniel Smith

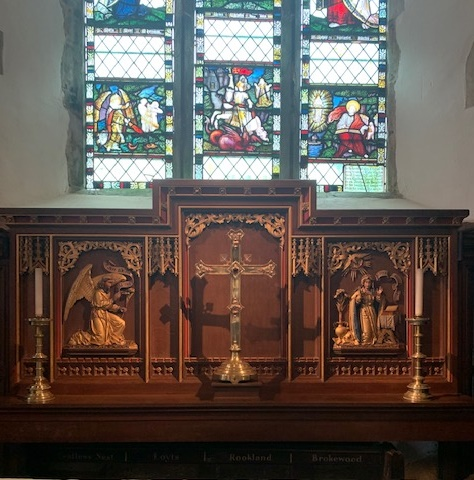
Reredos from c.1912 by C.E. Kempe & Co

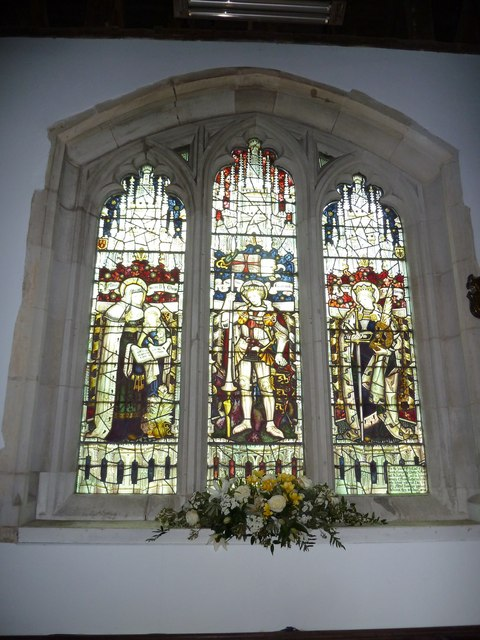
Hornung Memorial Window

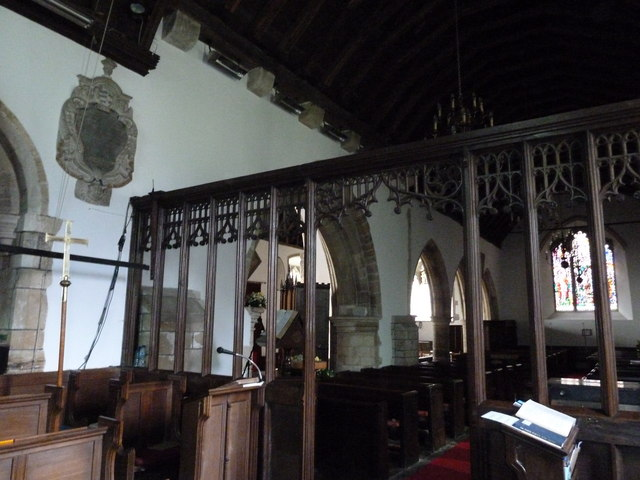
Rood screen at St.George's, West Grinstead

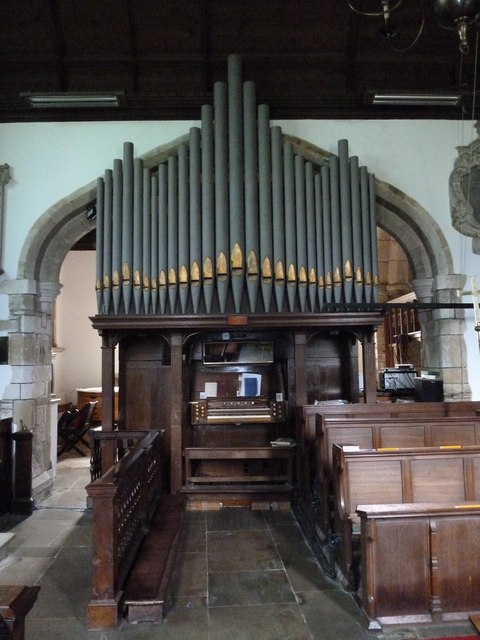
Church organ by Foster & Andrews from 1846

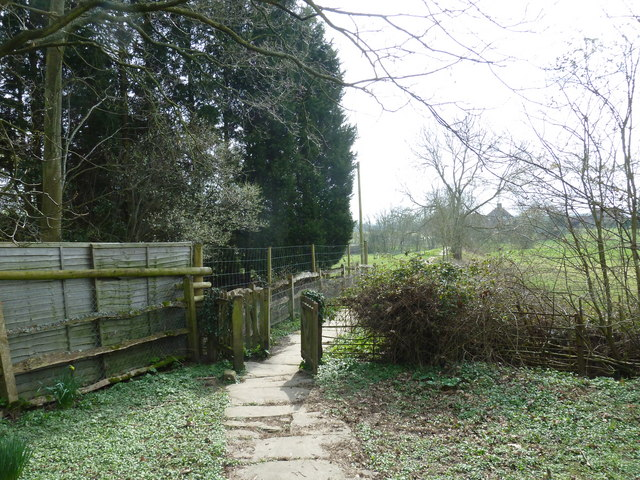
Footpath south to the causeway and Adur river

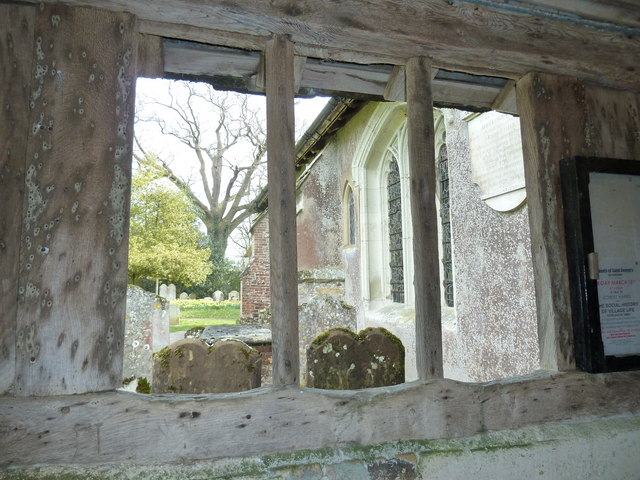
Inside late Medieval porch at St.George's

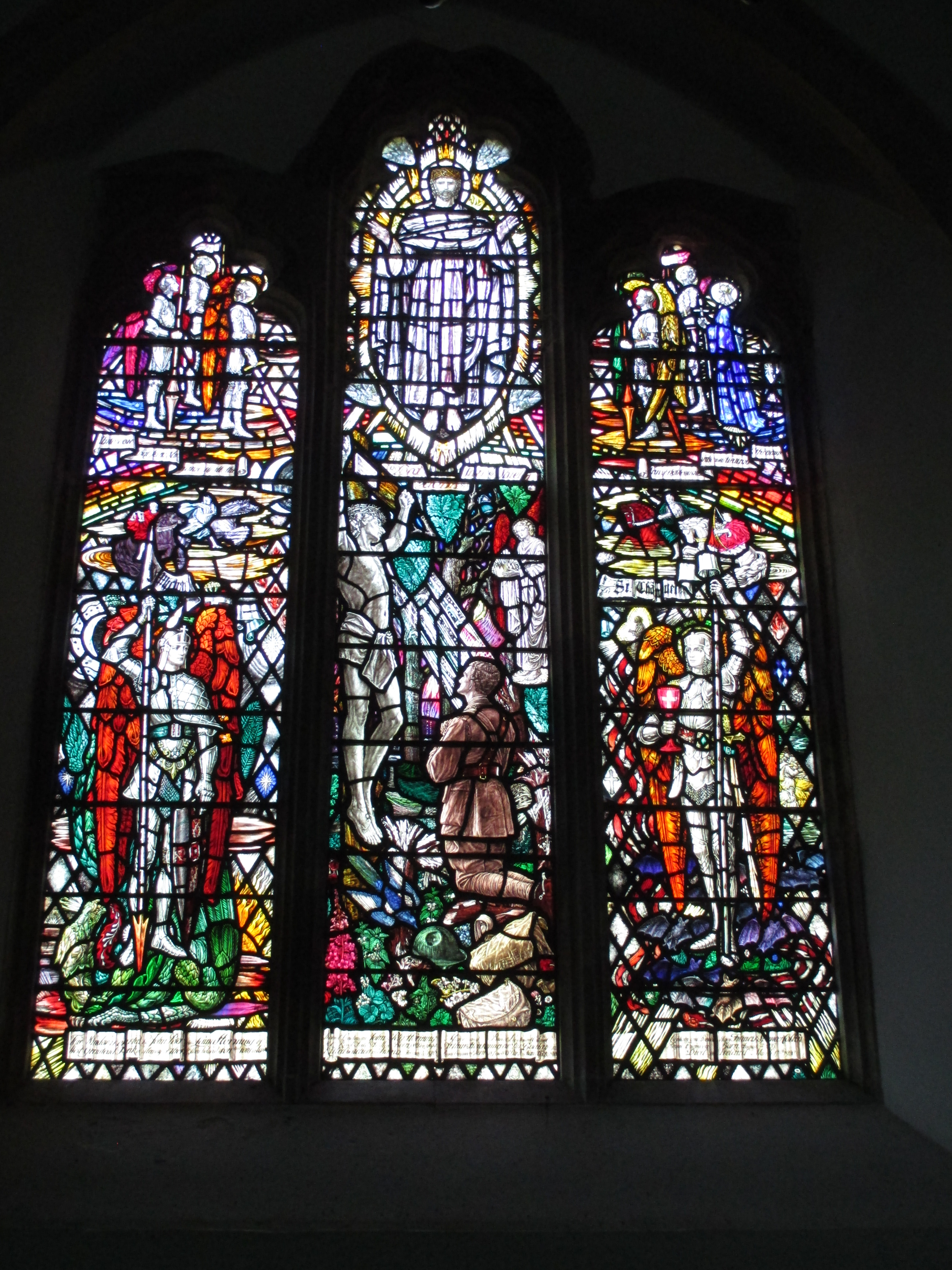
Stained-glass window painted by Walter Camm c. 1925

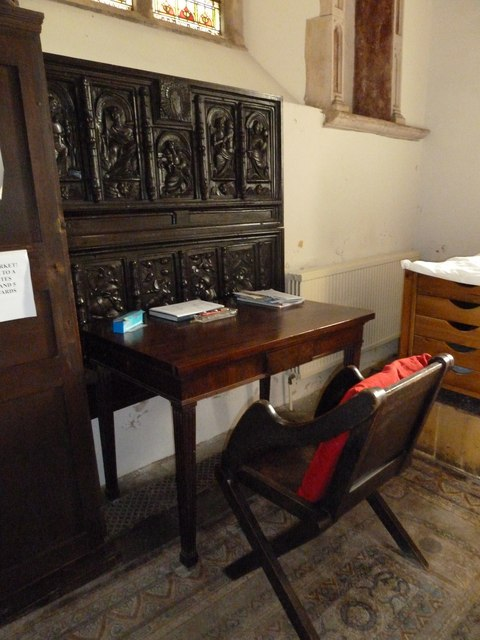
The Vestry at St.George's

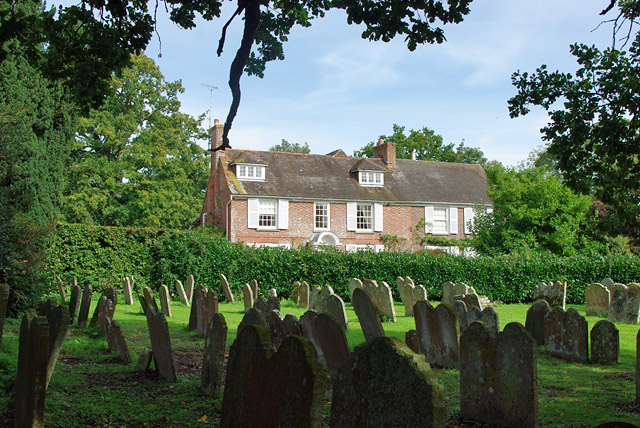
Glebe House, formerly The Rectory
