= Arthur du Boulay =

British military officer and cricketer

Arthur Houssemayne du Boulay
- Born: 18 June 1880; Chatham, Kent
- Died: 25 October 1918 (aged 38)
- Burial place: Fillièvres, Pas-de-Calais, France
- Military career
- Allegiance: United Kingdom
- Branch: British Army
- Service years: 1899–1918
- Rank: Major (Brevet Lt. col)
- Unit: Royal Engineers
- Conflicts: Second Boer War; Western Front 1916–1918
- Awards: Distinguished Service Order; Croix de Guerre; Order of Leopold II; Order of Agricultural Merit

Major Arthur Houssemayne du Boulay DSO (18 June 1880 – 25 October 1918) was a British military officer and amateur cricketer. Born in Kent, he served in the Royal Engineers from 1897 and saw active service in the Second Boer War and First World War. He played first-class cricket for Kent County Cricket Club and Gloucestershire County Cricket Club and died in the 1918 flu pandemic whilst on active service in October 1918.

== Early life ==
Du Boulay was the oldest child of Colonel Woodforde Houssemayne du Boulay (grandson of British financier François Jacques Houssemayne Du Boulay) and his wife Rose (née Hawkins). His father served in the Royal Engineers and du Boulay was born in 1880 at New Brompton in Chatham, Kent, close to the regimental headquarters. The family home was The Warren in Charlton, then in Kent. Du Boulay was educated at Cheltenham College where he was in the school cricket XI for three years and was captain in 1897, his final year at school, scoring over 300 runs and taking 33 wickets. He played for Kent's Second XI during the year and Wisden described him as a "fine batsman" and predicted that he may go on to play county cricket. He also played rugby union at school.

== Military career ==
After leaving school, du Boulay opted for a military career and entered the Royal Military Academy, Woolwich, the training academy for officers in the Royal Engineers, in January 1898. He shared the athletic award for the academy in 1898, and was awarded the Sword of Honour for being the best cadet on his course. He continued to play cricket at the academy, leading the batting and bowling averages in 1899. After graduation he was commissioned a second lieutenant in the Engineers on 22 November 1899.

Following service at the Royal School of Military Engineering (SME) at Chatham and in Ireland, du Boulay served in South Africa towards the end of the Second Boer War (1899–1902). He remained in South Africa until 1904 and was promoted to lieutenant whilst in the country, on 22 November 1902. Returning to Britain, du Boulay served as an instructor at the SME until 1908. He then served as adjutant in the 1st London Divisional Engineers, a Territorial Force division.

When war was declared in 1914 the division was mobilised and du Boulay promoted to captain with the role of assistant quartermaster general (AQMG) to the division which spent the remainder of 1914 and the first half of 1915 training. In June 1915 he transferred to the same role in the 33rd Division and in November 1915 arrived on the Western Front in France. The division saw action in the Battle of the Somme and du Boulay was mentioned in dispatches three times whilst with the 33rd, during which he was promoted to major. In June 1917 he was transferred to V Corps as assistant adjutant and quartermaster general and promoted to brevet lieutenant-colonel. He served at corps level for the remainder of 1917 and into 1918 and was mentioned in dispatches twice more. In June 1918 he was awarded the Distinguished Service Order in the 1918 Birthday Honours.

In June 1918 du Boulay was transferred to Army HQ level as AQMG on the Staff of the Third Army. In October 1918 he fell ill in the 1918 flu pandemic epidemic and died on 25 October 1918. He was buried in the Fillièvres British Cemetery south-west of Arras. He was mentioned in dispatches once more after his death and was posthumously awarded the Order of Leopold II with Palm, and the Croix de Guerre. He was also appointed as an Officer of the Order of Agricultural Merit.

== Cricket career ==
Arthur du Boulay
Cricket information
- Batting: Right-handed
- Bowling: Right-arm medium

Domestic team information
- Years: Team
- 1899: Kent
- 1908: Gloucestershire

Career statistics
Competition	First-class
Matches	9
Runs scored	303
Batting average	27.54
100s/50s	0/1
Top score	58
Balls bowled	264
Wickets	3
Bowling average	59.00
5 wickets in innings	0
10 wickets in match	0
Best bowling	1/4
Catches/stumpings	2/–
- Source: ESPNcricinfo, 2 June 2017

After playing cricket in school and whilst at the Royal Military Academy, Woolwich, du Boulay played five first-class cricket matches for Kent County Cricket Club whilst serving with the Royal Engineers in 1899. He had some success, scoring 250 runs in eight innings, but was restricted in how frequently he could play cricket by his military career. He played in matches for the Royal Engineers Cricket Club between 1906 and 1912, including in a number of matches against the Royal Artillery. He made a number of high scores for the Engineers, including making 204, 153 and 175 during one week and scoring 402 not out in 1907 against the Royal Navy and Royal Marines at Chatham. He played three times for the Army against the Royal Navy.

Du Boulay played three more first-class matches for Gloucestershire in August 1908. He was a member of I Zingari, and played occasionally for Marylebone Cricket Club (MCC); his final first-class appearance was for MCC against Nottinghamshire at Lord's in 1910. He scored a total of 303 first-class runs and took three wickets in his nine first-class matches.

== Family ==
Du Boulay married Blanche Hornung (1887–1985), daughter of British planter and horse breeder Pitt Hornung, in 1909. They had three children. Their daughter Suzanne married Lord Douglas Gordon (brother of the 12th Marquess of Huntly) in 1940. Blanche remarried Lieutenant-General Sir Hugh Elles in 1939. Du Boulay's brother Hubert was killed in action in 1916 as was his brother-in-law John Hornung. Du Boulay and Hornung are memorialised in a stained glass window at St George's Church, West Grinstead in West Sussex. Arthur and Hubert are also commemorated on a plaque in St Botolph's Church, Colchester, Essex.

Two of du Boulay's nephews also played cricket; Roger du Boulay was captain of the First XI at Repton School and Hubert Webb played for Oxford University and Hampshire after World War II.

== Bibliography ==
- Carlaw, Derek (2020). Kent County Cricketers, A to Z: Part One (1806–1914) (PDF). Cardiff: ACS.
