= Hörning =

Hörning is a German-language surname. Notable people with the surname include:

- Alphonse Hörning, Swiss bobsledder
- Dan Hörning (born 1970), Swedish historical fantasy author
- Walo Hörning (1910–1986), Swiss fencer

== See also ==
- Horning (surname)
- Hornung
