= Hubert Webb (neurovirologist) =

English cricketer, professor, and neurovirologist (1927–2010)

Personal information
- Full name: Hubert Eustace Webb
- Born: 30 May 1927; Tonk, Tonk State, British India
- Died: 8 November 2010 (aged 83); Roehampton, London, England
- Batting: Right-handed
- Bowling: Leg break
- Relatives: Arthur du Boulay (uncle); Moray Macpherson (nephew)

Domestic team information
- Years: Team
- 1946–1948: Oxford University
- 1954: Hampshire

Career statistics
Competition	First-class
Matches	15
Runs scored	461
Batting average	20.95
100s/50s	1/3
Top score	145*
Balls bowled	24
Wickets	1
Bowling average	15.00
5 wickets in innings	–
10 wickets in match	–
Best bowling	1/10
Catches/stumpings	7/–
- Source: Cricinfo, 1 February 2010

Hubert Eustace "Hughie" Webb (30 May 1927 — 8 November 2010) was a pioneering and internationally renowned professor of neurovirology at St Thomas's Hospital in London. During his youth, he was an outstanding sportsman who played cricket at first-class level for both Oxford University and Hampshire.

== Early life and varsity cricket ==
The son of Indian Army Political Service official Wilfred Webb and Kathleen du Boulay, he was born in British India at Tonk in May 1927. He was educated in England at Winchester College, where he excelled at sport. During the summer term of his final year at Winchester, Field Marshal Bernard Montgomery came to visit his son, David, where he was impressed by Webb's captaincy of the college cricket team in their match against Eton College. As a result, he was invited by Montgomery to accompany his son on a visit to his headquarters in the British occupation zone in Germany, as well as meeting Vasily Chuikov, the Soviet general who captured the Führerbunker. From Winchester, he matriculated to study medicine at New College, Oxford. His medical training was undertaken at St Thomas' Hospital, having gained a scholarship there in 1948.

At Oxford, Webb again excelled in sport and won blues in four sports: golf, cricket, squash and rackets. In cricket, he made his debut in first-class for Oxford University Cricket Club against Lancashire at Oxford in 1946; however, he had little success that season and was dropped after three games, and did not play any first-class cricket in 1947. He returned to the Oxford side in 1948, making eleven first-class appearances in that season. In these, he scored 401 runs at an average of 28.64. He gained his cricket club in that season's University Match against Cambridge University at Lord's, in which he scored an unbeaten 145 in Oxford's first innings. His innings took 170 minutes, and included an eighth wicket partnership of 112 in 50 minutes with Tony Mallett. Wisden wrote of his performance that "Webb was supreme".

== Medical career and later life ==
Webb qualified as a physician at St Thomas's Hospital in 1951, and was appointed as a house surgeon. He undertook his National Service with the Royal Army Medical Corps, gaining a short-service commission as a lieutenant in September 1953, with promotion to captain following in November of the same year. He played a first-class match for Hampshire in 1954, against Oxford University. By this point, Webb had a young family and his short-service commission enabled him to take his family to any posting. He was sent to Singapore at the height of the Malayan Emergency, where he worked in the British Military Hospital. It was in Singapore that he developed an interest in viral diseases that affected the central nervous system. Amongst the diseases in studied in Malaya was a tick-borne encephalitis, which was afflicting British troops and Malayan children, but not Malayan adults, with Webb realising their immunity was key to both prevention and cure. His success treating tick-borne encephalitis earned him an invitation to the National Research Council in Kuala Lumpur, where he worked in 1957 and 1958, following his discharge from the British Army. This in turn led to him joining the Rockefeller Foundation's new viral research institute in India at Poona.

In India where he made a study of Kyasanur Forest disease (KSD) which affected birds, monkeys, squirrels, and humans. Webb noted similarities between cases in India and those in Soviet Russia, establishing a possible link to migratory birds; this led to the first in a long series of learned papers in medical journals and a lifelong career in neurovirology. He later turned down a further offer of employment from the Rockefeller Foundation, and returned to England, where he was appointed a neurology registrar at St Thomas’. He was appointed a consultant there in 1964. He would become a professor of neurovirology in 1988 and ran his own research facility at St Thomas', where he led research into KSD and the Langat virus. For his contributions in the field, he was recognised by the University of London with a Doctor of Science, with his work having an international reputation. At St Thomas', he ran an early morning general practice for the Nightingale nurses of St Thomas', and became an honorary Nightingale upon his retirement.

In retirement, he maintained an interest in sports, playing both golf and tennis. He was also a member of All England Lawn Tennis and Croquet Club. Webb died at Roehampton in November 2010. He was survived by his wife, Monica, and their two children. His nephew, Moray Macpherson, and uncle, Arthur du Boulay, also played first-class cricket.
