= St Michael and All Angels Church, Partridge Green =

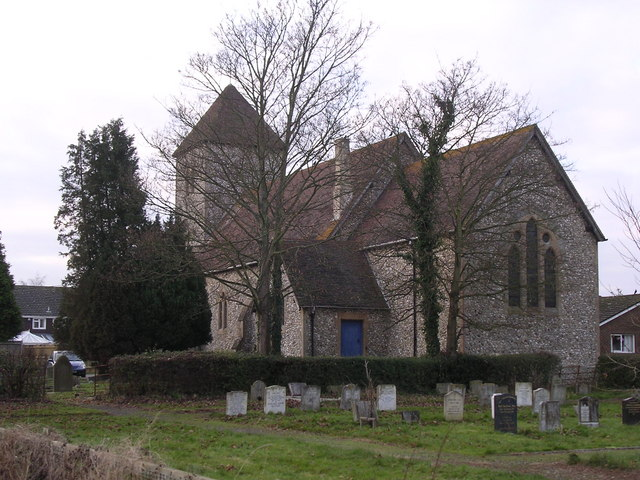
- St Michael and All Angels Church, Partridge Green
- 50.96215°N 0.308284°W
- Location: Church Lane, Partridge Green, West Sussex
- Country: England
- Denomination: Anglican
- Website: Parish of West Grinstead

History
- Dedication: St Michael and All Angels

Administration
- Province: Canterbury
- Diocese: Chichester
- Archdeaconry: Horsham
- Deanery: Horsham
- Parish: West Grinstead

Clergy
- Archbishop: Most Revd Justin Welby
- Bishop: Rt Revd Ruth Bushyager

St Michael and All Angels Church is a late nineteenth-century church in the settlement of Partridge Green in the parish of West Grinstead in West Sussex. It was built to cater for the then growing population of the village. Ian Nairn, in the Sussex volume of The Buildings of England, approves of the simplicity of this "flint village church" and comments that most "other counties would have had it much fussier". St Michael and All Angels' shares its mission with the parish church of St George's Church, West Grinstead.

== History ==
Houses were built in the village in the eighteenth century, and expansion increased after the Partridge Green railway station was opened in 1861. The settlement was served from 1884 by an iron mission room in nearby Jolesfield. The new church was built in 1890 on a site given by the Rev. John Goring, with the memorial stone laid by Lady Burrell on 30 May 1890. The church was designed in thirteenth century style by the architectural firm of W.G. Habershon and J.F. Fawkner. The church was served by curates until 1946, since when it has been served by the priest-in-charge of West Grinstead.

== Description ==
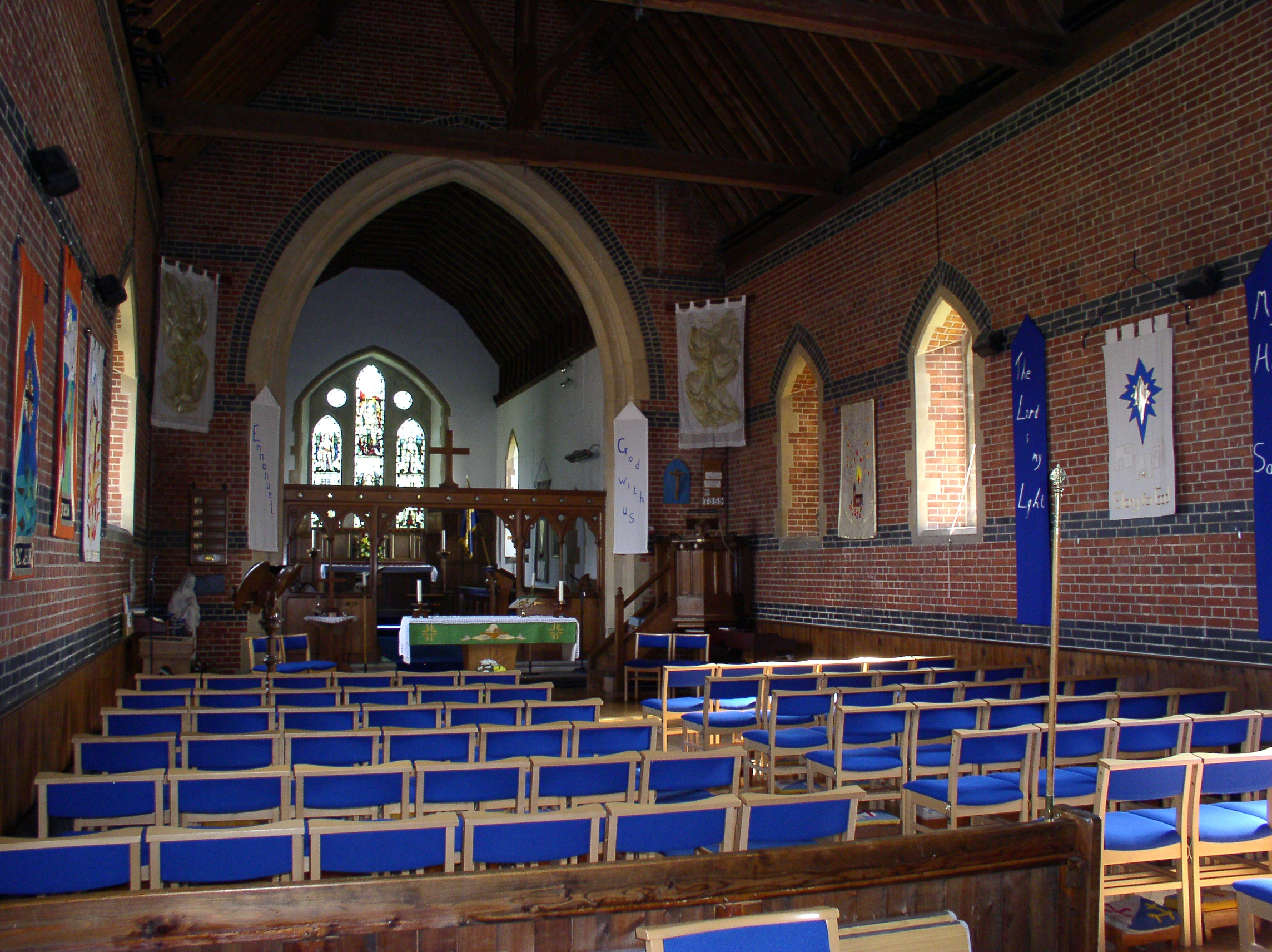
The nave of St Michael and All Angels Church

The church consists of a chancel, nave and west tower. Entry is by a south porch. The exterior is constructed of flint with stone dressings. Inside the walls are of exposed brick. The rere-arches of the lancet windows and the tower and chancel arches are of stone. The timber framed roof is described by John Allen as the best feature. The tower has a tiled pyramidal cap.

== Organ, fittings and windows ==
The organ was manufactured by Conacher and Co. The font may have been cut from an earlier medieval original. The east window is by C.E. Kempe

== Images ==
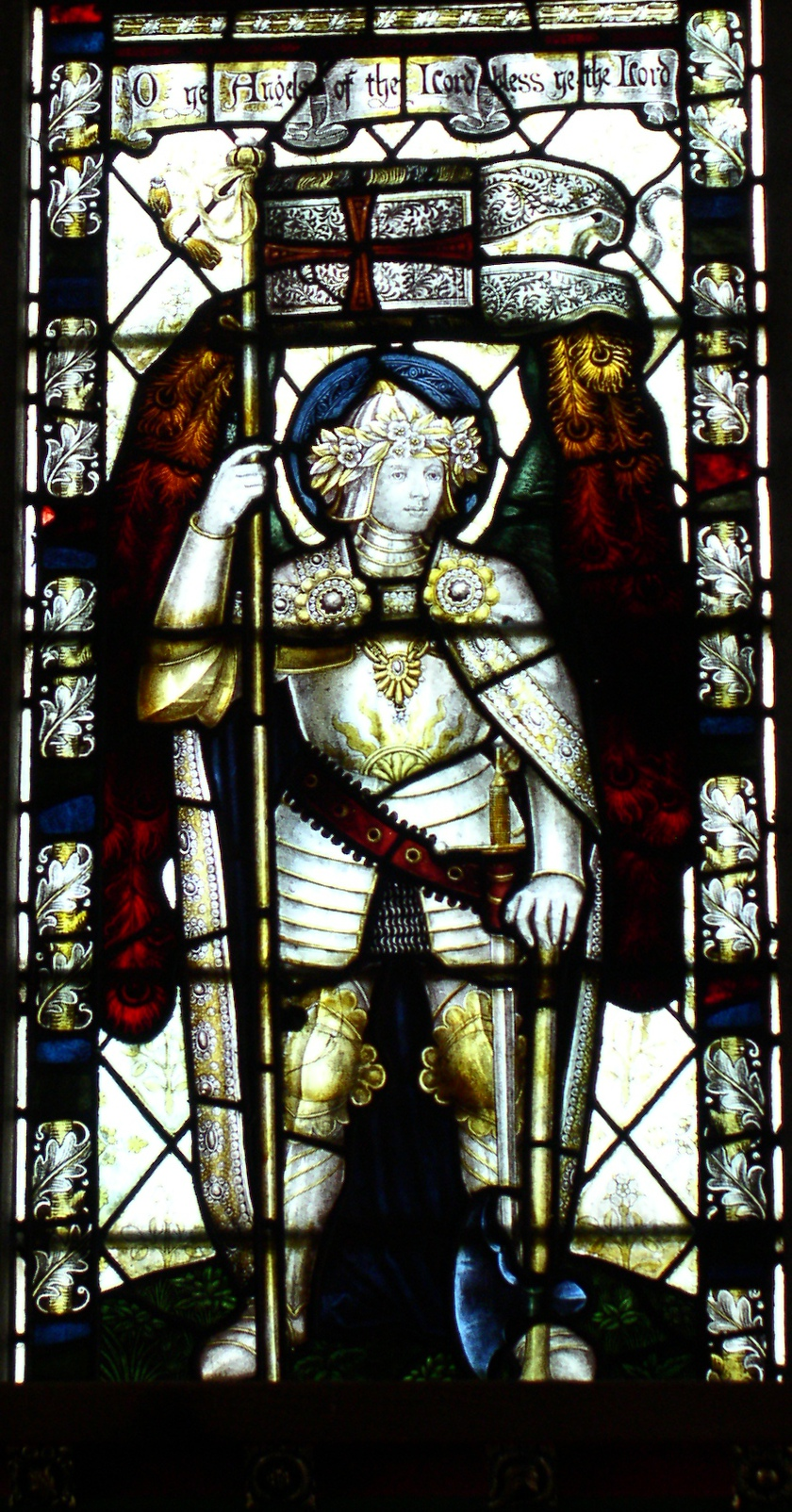
Detail of the east window of St Michael and All Angels Church

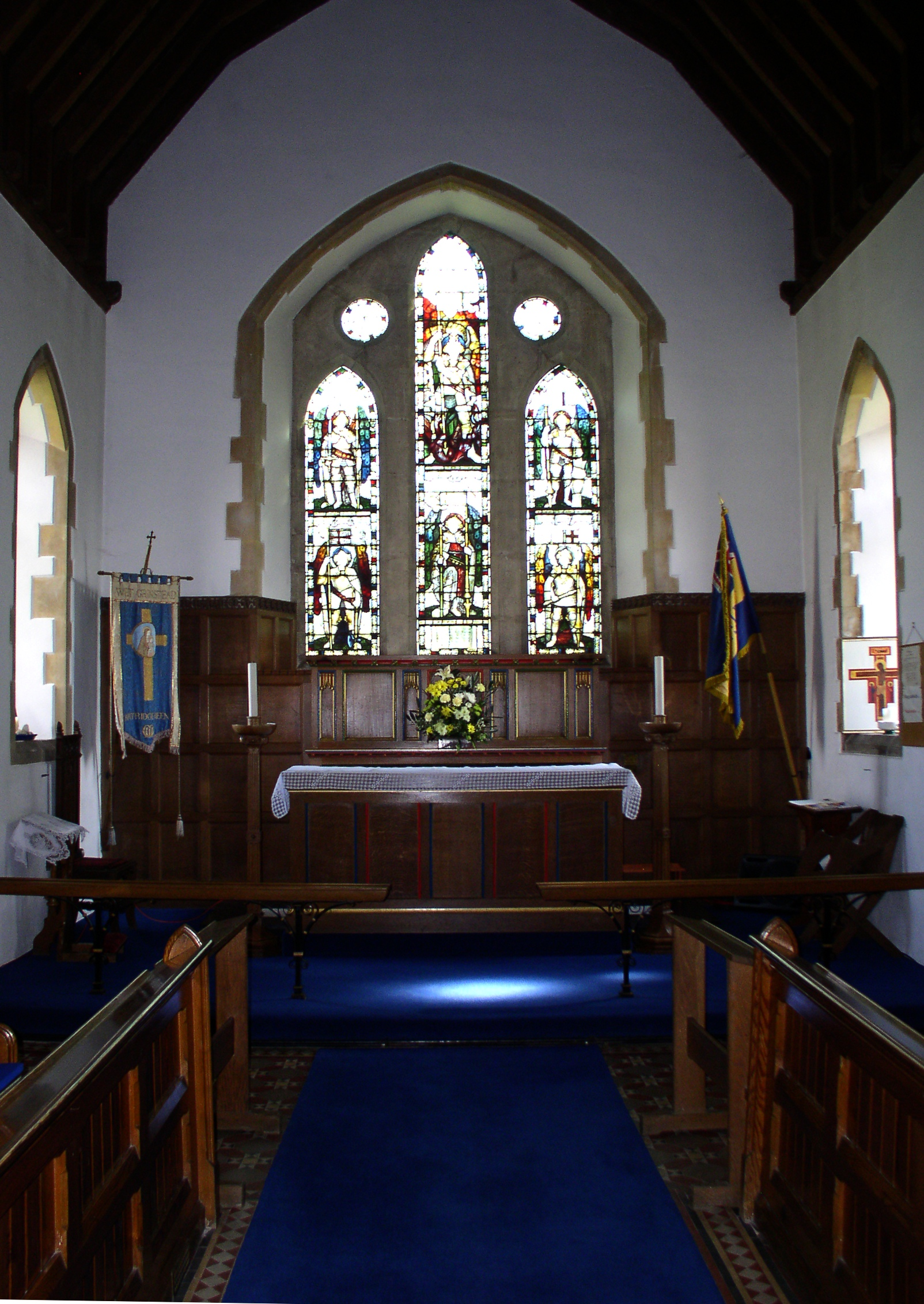
The chancel of St Michael and All Angels Church

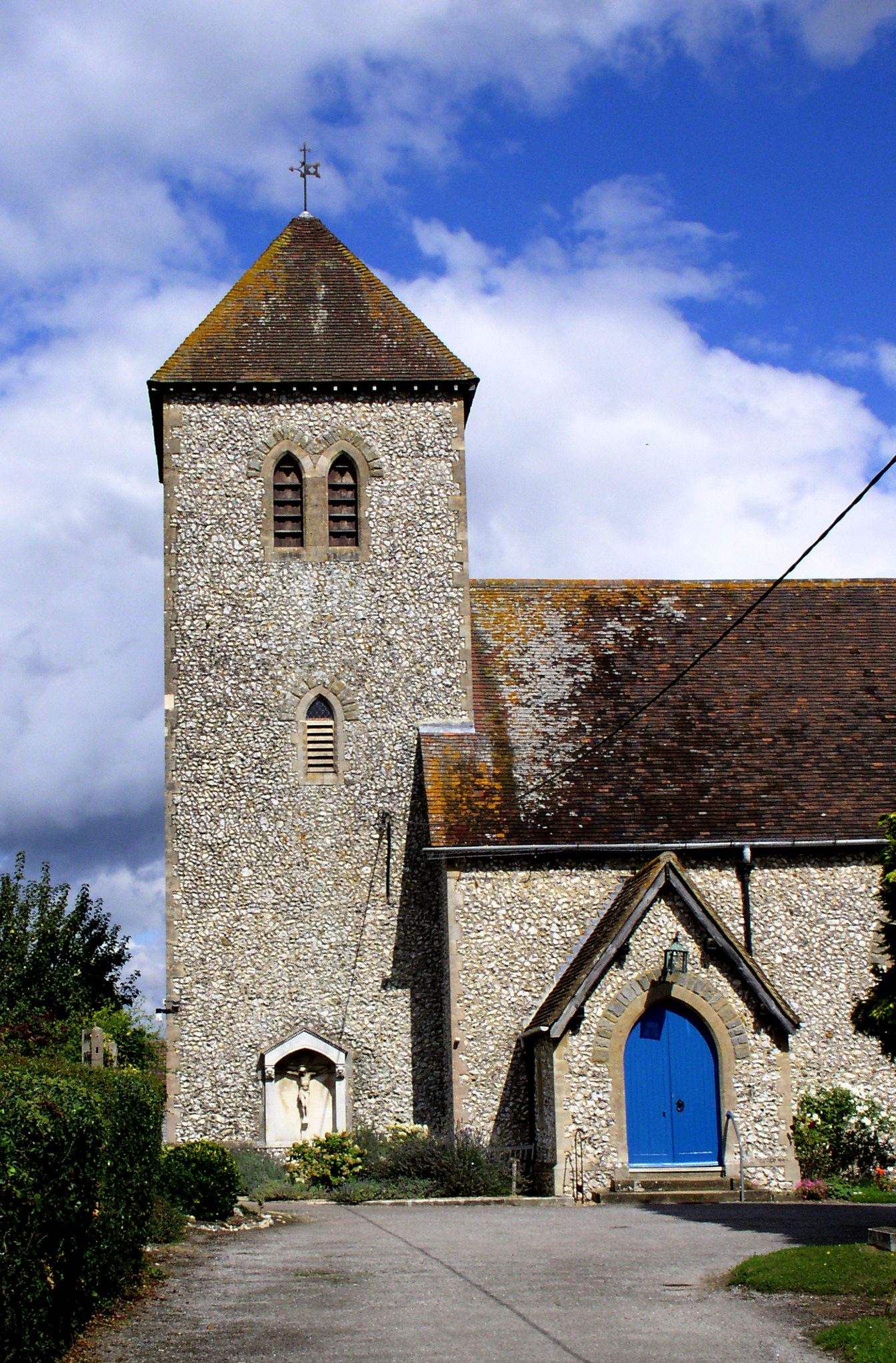
The tower of St Michael and All Angels Church

== See also ==
- List of places of worship in Horsham (district)
- Victorian architecture

== Bibliography ==
- Elleray, D. Robert (1981). The Victorian Churches of Sussex. Chichester: Phillimore & Co. Ltd. ISBN 0-85033-378-4.
- Elleray, D. Robert (2004). Sussex Places of Worship. Worthing: Optimus Books. ISBN 0-9533132-7-1.
- Nairn, Ian; Pevsner, Nikolaus (1965). The Buildings of England: Sussex. Harmondsworth: Penguin Books. ISBN 0-14-071028-0.
- Wales, Tony (1999). The West Sussex Village Book. Newbury: Countryside Books. ISBN 1-85306-581-1.
