= Horning (surname) =

Horning is a German language surname. Like the related Hörning and Hornung it may either be derived from the term hornung and in this case be used as a nickname for someone with a relationship to the month of February or derived from Middle Low German hornink and then used for a person born out of wedlock (horns as symbols of cuckoldry) or a topographic name referring to the hornlike shape of a property.
Notable people with the surname include:

- Al Horning (1939–2023), Canadian politician
- Jim Horning (1942–2013), American computer scientist
- Karen Horning (born 1966), Peruvian swimmer
- Marjorie G. Horning (1917–2020), American biochemist and pharmacologist
- Ross Horning (1920–2005), American historian
- Steamer Horning (1892–1982), American football player
- William A. Horning (1904–1959), American art director
