= Moray Macpherson =

English cricketer, clergyman

Personal information
- Full name: Moray Charles Livingstone Macpherson
- Born: 4 November 1959; Barton on Sea, Hampshire, England
- Died: 5 February 2016 (aged 56); Northwood, London, England
- Batting: Right-handed
- Role: Wicket-keeper
- Relatives: Hubert Webb (uncle)

Domestic team information
- Years: Team
- 1980: Oxford University

Career statistics
Competition	First-class
Matches	5
Runs scored	52
Batting average	5.77
100s/50s	–/–
Top score	22
Catches/stumpings	8/1
- Source: Cricinfo, 22 March 2020

Moray Charles Livingstone Macpherson (4 November 1959 – 5 February 2016) was an English first-class cricketer.

The son of Rorie and Shelagh Macpherson, he was born at Barton on Sea, Hampshire. He was educated firstly at Horris Hill School, before attending Winchester College. From Winchester he went up to Lincoln College, Oxford where he played first-class cricket for Oxford University on five occasions in 1980. Playing as a wicket-keeper, he scored a total of 55 runs in his five matches, with a high score of 22. Behind the stumps he took eight catches and made a single stumping. He died in February 2016 at the Michael Sobell Hospice in Northwood, following a battle with cancer. His uncle, Hubert Webb, was also a first-class cricketer.
