= Hugh Elles =

British Army general

Lieutenant-General Sir Hugh Elles KCB KCMG KCVO DSO
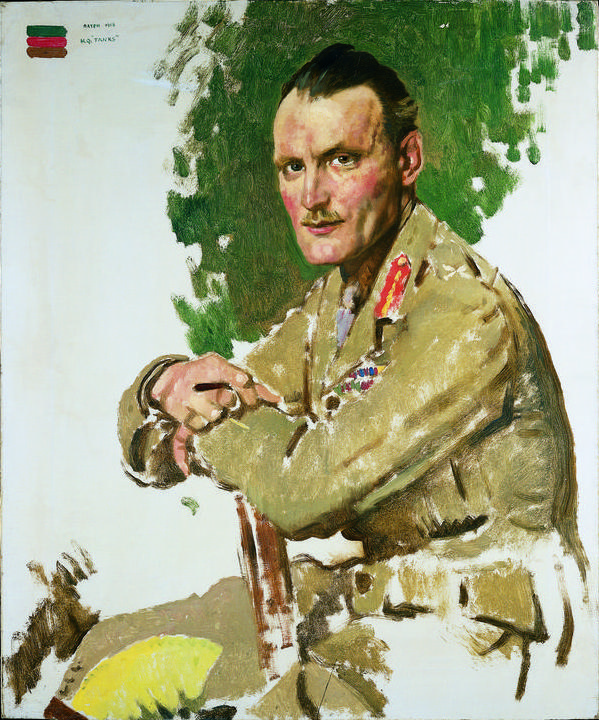
- 1917 portrait by William Orpen
- Born: 27 May 1880; British India
- Died: 11 July 1945 (aged 65); London, England
- Military career
- Allegiance: United Kingdom
- Branch: British Army
- Service years: 1899–1938
- Rank: Lieutenant-General
- Service number: 349
- Units: Royal Engineers; Royal Tank Corps
- Commands: 42nd (East Lancashire) Infantry Division; 9th Infantry Brigade; Royal Tank Corps
- Conflicts: Second Boer War; First World War
- Awards: Knight Commander of the Order of the Bath; Knight Commander of the Order of St Michael and St George; Knight Commander of the Royal Victorian Order; Distinguished Service Order; Mentioned in Despatches; Army Distinguished Service Medal (United States)

Lieutenant-General Sir Hugh Jamieson Elles, KCB, KCMG, KCVO, DSO (27 May 1880 – 11 July 1945) was a British Army officer and the first commander of the newly formed Tank Corps during the First World War.

== Early life ==
Born in British India on 27 May 1880, Hugh Jamieson Elles was the younger son of Sir Edmond Elles. Returning to England, he was educated at Clifton College, and the Royal Military Academy, Woolwich, after which he was commissioned as a second lieutenant into the Royal Engineers in June 1899. He served in South Africa during the latter part of the Second Boer War and then undertook regimental duty in Aldershot. In 1913 he attended the Staff College, Camberley.

== First World War ==
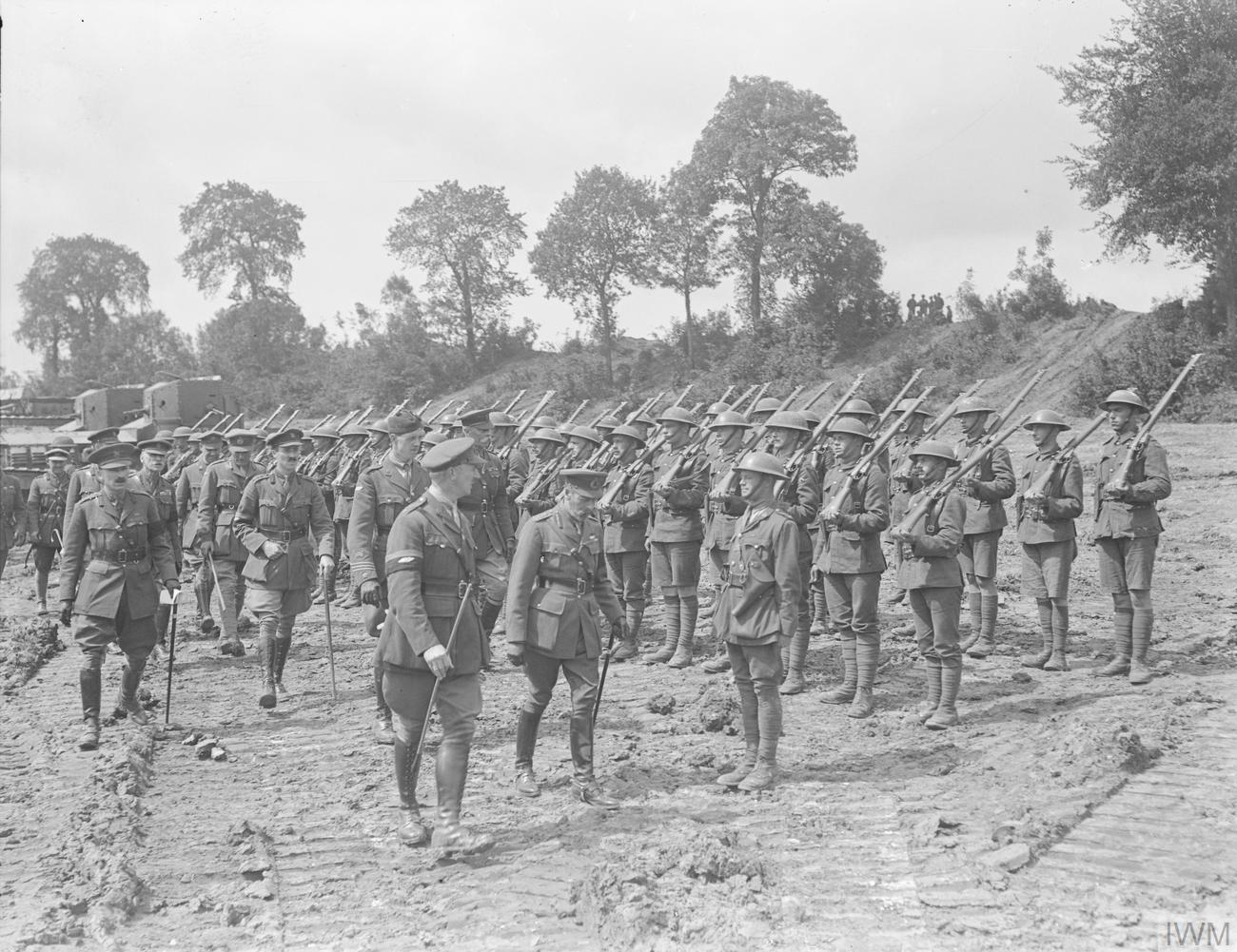
King George V with Major-General Hugh Elles inspecting tanks and crews at Sautricourt, 10 August 1918.

On the outbreak of the First World War in August 1914, he was posted to the staff of the 4th Division and departed for France soon afterwards. He served at Le Cateau, then took part in the Retreat to the Seine and the battle of the Aisne, where the Imperial German Army was halted. He then moved north with the British Expeditionary Force to Flanders, taking part in the Battle of Armentières in October 1914. In February 1915, he was promoted to brevet major and the next month became the brigade major of the 10th Infantry Brigade. He was wounded during the brigades' counterattack, on 25 April 1915, during the Second Battle of Ypres.

In August 1915, after recovering from his injuries, Elles was one of three officers specially selected by General Sir William Robertson, soon to be Chief of the Imperial General Staff (CIGS), the professional head of the British Army, to liaise with troops at the front and pass the information directly to the British General Headquarters (GHQ). He was promoted to major in November 1915. In January 1916, as a general staff officer (GSO), Elles was sent by General Sir Douglas Haig, the commander-in-chief of the BEF on the Western Front, to investigate the first tanks or "caterpillars" being built in England. He attended the first trials of "Mother" and reported back to Haig on its success. During the summer of 1916, Elles, who in June had been awarded the Distinguished Service Order (DSO), was tasked to report back from the Somme, where the tanks were first used. He was made a general staff officer, grade 1 in June 1916 and was granted the temporary rank of lieutenant colonel while holding the appointment. Promoted to the temporary rank of colonel, Elles was appointed to head the Heavy Branch (the first tank units) of the Machine Gun Corps in France on 29 September 1916.

Having seen the tanks achieve little success during the Battle of Passchendaele because of the exceptionally wet ground conditions of the autumn 1917, he pressed Haig to use massed tanks on the drier, open ground at Cambrai. On 20 November 1917 he personally led 350 tanks into battle at Cambrai in a Mark IV tank called Hilda, named after a favourite aunt. Elles, promoted to brevet colonel in June 1918, continued to command the Tank Corps until Germany's surrender in November 1918.

For his services during the war he was awarded the Army Distinguished Service Medal by the Government of the United States. The citation for the medal reads:

The President of the United States of America, authorized by Act of Congress, July 9, 1918, takes pleasure in presenting the Army Distinguished Service Medal to Major General Hugh J. Elles, Royal British Army, for exceptionally meritorious and distinguished service in a position of great responsibility to the Government of the United States, during World War I. While Commanding the Tank Corps, British Expeditionary Forces, General Elles rendered invaluable service to the American Expeditionary Forces and to the cause in which the United States has been engaged.

== Later career ==
After the war, and after being promoted to substantive colonel in July 1919, he commanded the Tank Corps Training Centre from 1919 to 1923 and was Inspector of Tank Corps at the War Office. In October 1923 he was appointed an aide-de-camp to King George V. He then commanded the 9th Infantry Brigade being posted to HQ Eastern Command as Chief of Staff in August 1926.

In May 1930 he was appointed director of military training at the War Office and then, in 1933, became general officer commanding of the 42nd (East Lancashire) Infantry Division, a Territorial Army formation, although this only lasted for a few months. In April 1934, he was appointed Master-General of the Ordnance in the rank of lieutenant general; he was also the head of the Mechanisation Branch for which his previous service made him particularly suitable. He retired in 1938 and was Civil Defence Commissioner for South West England during the Second World War.

Elles was married three times, his first two wives dying before him. He died in London on 11 July 1945 and was survived by his last wife Blanche Houssemayne du Boulay (née Hornung).

Military offices
Preceded by Arthur McNamara	GOC 42nd (East Lancashire) Infantry Division; 1933–1934	Succeeded by Kenneth Buchanan
Preceded by Sir Ronald Charles	Master-General of the Ordnance; 1934–1938	Vacant
