= Anna Hornung =

Polish Righteous Among the Nations (1922–2012)

- Born: Anna Tomczak; 4 July 1922
- Died: 12 February 2012 (aged 89); Haifa, Israel

Anna Hornung (4 July 1922 – 12 February 2012) was a woman from Poland who rescued Jews during World War II. Hornung was awarded the status of Righteous Among the Nations for her efforts.

Hornung died on 12 February 2012 in Haifa.

== Recognition ==
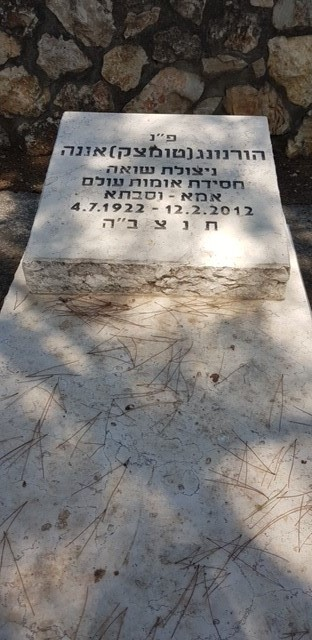
The grave of Anna Hornung at Kiryat Tiv'on Cemetery.

Yad Vashem recognized Hornung as Righteous Among the Nations on 16 December 1996. A tree was planted and dedicated to her at the Garden of the Righteous and her name was added to the Wall of Honour.
