= Fillièvres =

- Commune
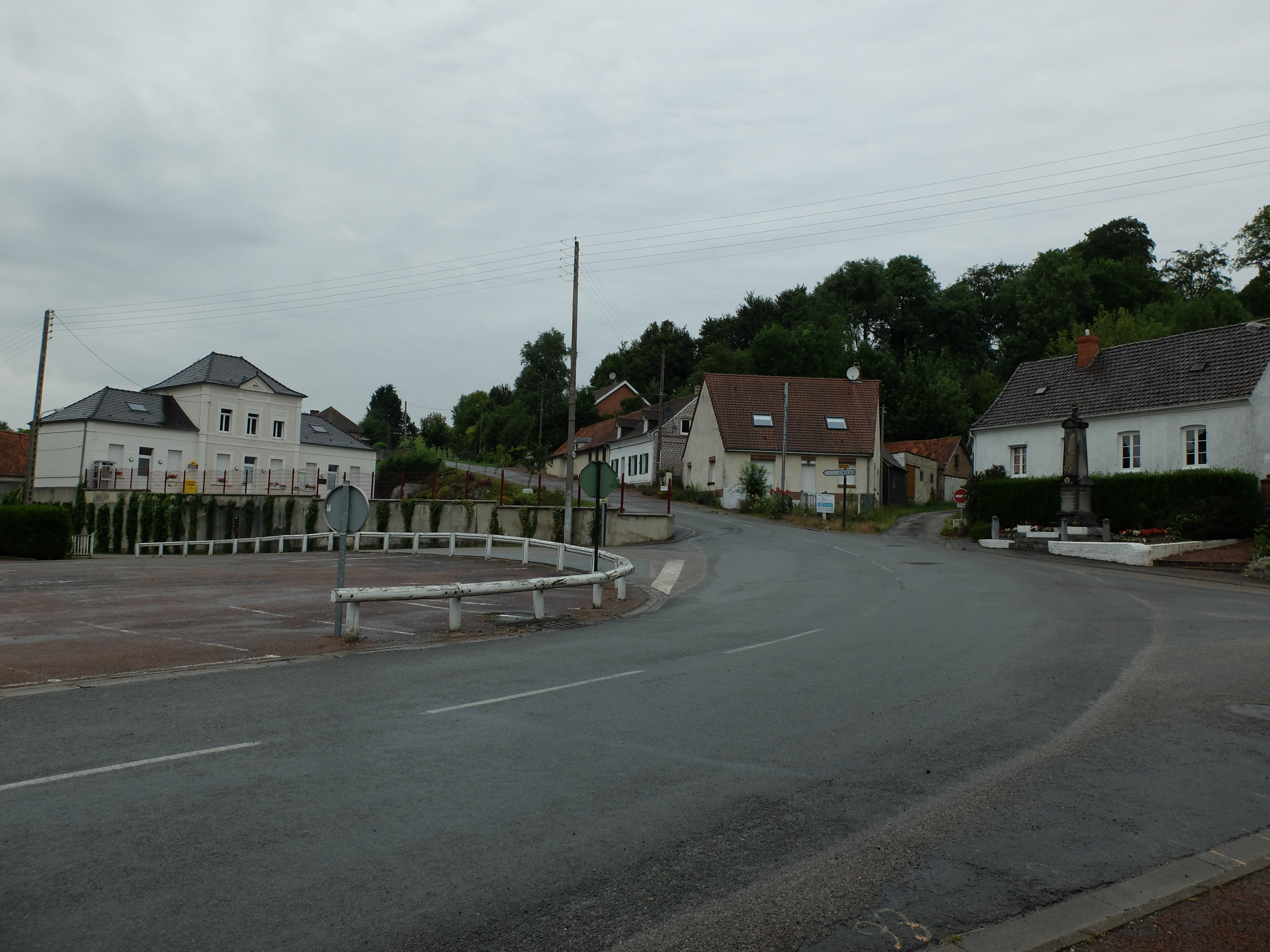
- A view within Fillièvres

- Coat of arms
- Location of Fillièvres
- Location within France Location within Hauts-de-France
- Coordinates: 50°19′10″N 2°09′42″E
- Country: France
- Region: Hauts-de-France
- Department: Pas-de-Calais
- Arrondissement: Montreuil
- Canton: Auxi-le-Château
- Intercommunality: CC des 7 Vallées

Government
  - Mayor (2020–2026): Jim Dourlens
- Area^{1}: 20.43 km^{2} (7.89 sq mi)
- Elevation: 48 m (157 ft)
- Highest elevation: 139 m (456 ft)
- Lowest elevation: 40 m (130 ft)
- Population (2023): 510
  - Density: 25/km^{2} (65/sq mi)
- Time zone: UTC+01:00 (CET)
  - Summer (DST): UTC+02:00 (CEST)
- INSEE/Postal code: 62335 /62770
- ^{1} French Land Register data, which excludes lakes, ponds, glaciers > 1 km^{2} (0.386 sq mi or 247 acres) and river estuaries.

Fillièvres is a commune in the Pas-de-Calais department in the Hauts-de-France region of France.

== Geography ==
A village situated some 20 miles (32 km) southeast of Montreuil-sur-Mer at the D340 road.

== Population ==
Historical population
Year	Pop.	±% p.a.
1968	548	—
1975	535	−0.34%
1982	539	+0.11%
1990	536	−0.07%
1999	499	−0.79%
2007	521	+0.54%
2012	512	−0.35%
2017	509	−0.12%
2023	510	+0.03%
Source: INSEE

== Places of interest ==
- The 16th century church of Notre-Dame

== See also ==
- Communes of the Pas-de-Calais department
