= William de Braose =

William de Braose or Brewose or Briouze may refer to:

- William de Braose, 1st Lord of Bramber (died 1093/1096)
- William de Braose, 3rd Lord of Bramber (fl. 1135–1179)
- William de Braose, 4th Lord of Bramber (1140/1150–1211) infamous for the Christmas Day Massacre of Welsh Princes at Abergavenny Castle in 1175
- William de Braose (died 1230), son of Reginald de Braose, hanged by Llywelyn the Great
- William de Braose (bishop), bishop of Llandaff Cathedral from 1266 to 1287
- William de Braose, 1st Baron Braose (died 1291)
- William de Braose, 2nd Baron Braose (died 1326)

== See also ==
- Baron Braose
- House of Braose
