= Pitt Hornung =

- Born: 1861; Cleveland Hills, Middlesbrough, England
- Died: 1940 (aged 78–79)
- Citizenship: British
- Occupation: Entrepreneur
- Known for: founded a number of sugar cane plantations in Portuguese East Africa

John Peter ‘Pitt’ Hornung (1861–1940) was a British entrepreneur who founded a number of sugar cane plantations in Portuguese East Africa (later Mozambique), known as the Sena Sugar Estates, in the late nineteenth and twentieth centuries; he was also a breeder of race horses, establishing the West Grinstead Stud in the 1920s.

== Early life and education ==
Pitt Hornung was born in 1861 in Cleveland Hills, Middlesbrough, England; his father John Hornung (1821–1886, who was christened Johan Petrus Hornung in Sibiu County in Transylvania, a region of Hungary at that time), after working in Hamburg for a shipping firm, had moved to Britain as a coal and iron merchant and set up a flourishing trade and shipping business in the 1850s; his youngest brother was the author E.W. Hornung.

After being educated at the Collegiate School in Edinburgh, Scotland, he was sent away by his parents to work on a ranch in Uruguay. Upon his return to England, Pitt was again sent overseas to work, this time in Lisbon, Portugal.

== Career ==
In 1883, Pitt met and married Laura de Paiva Raposo, whose father leased a number of concessions, or prazos, along the Zambezi delta in Portuguese East Africa. After the death of both his father and father-in-law, Pitt turned his own attentions to the concessions and, in 1889, he decided to attempt to establish sugar cane plantations at the concessions in Mopeia.

Despite a number of setbacks, the first sugar was cut at Mopeia in 1893, producing a modest 600 tons. Nonetheless, the venture was successful enough to enable Pitt to raise sufficient funds to establish a second plantation and factory at nearby Caia, in 1906; the resulting company was known as the Sena Sugar Factory. By buying out other, less successful sugar cane concessions which had sprung up in the region and transforming them into successful entities – including a concession at Marromeu – Pitt's business went from strength to strength, and he established a sugar cane empire. The various concerns were grouped into one company – the Sena Sugar Estates – in 1920, and a further factory was established at Luabo in 1922.

As a result of his activities in Portuguese East Africa, Pitt became a wealthy man. Seeking a genteel lifestyle back in England, Pitt moved his family from Strawberry Hill in Twickenham, near London, to West Grinstead Park, West Sussex, which he purchased in 1913 from Sir Merrik Burrell. Having acquired a passion for both the breeding and racing of horses, Pitt eventually established his own stud, registering the West Grinstead Stud in 1924. Pitt enjoyed some considerable success as a breeder, and the West Grinstead Stud produced 129 winners over 26 years; however, his purchase of Papyrus, the 1923 Derby winner, was deemed commercially unsuccessful, since he failed to sire sufficient winners.

== Personal life ==
Pitt Hornung and his Portuguese wife Laura had three sons and two daughters, including their younger daughter Blanche Hornung (1887–1985), who married firstly Lt Col. Arthur Houssemayne Du Boulay, in 1909, and secondly Lt Gen. Sir Hugh Jamieson Elles, in 1939.

== Death and legacy ==
Pitt Hornung died in February 1940. West Grinstead Park was sold off and the stud went on to become part of the National Stud in 1949, although one of Pitt's sons, Colonel Bernard Hornung, went on to establish his own stud in Cowfold, West Sussex, in 1950 (this was eventually liquidated in 1984). The Sena Sugar Estates remained a family concern until 1978, when the estates were sacked by Mozambique's Renamo rebels during the country's civil war. In 2009, the Hornung family presented the surviving archives of Hornung & Co Ltd, which managed Sena Sugar Estates and the West Grinstead Stud, amongst other concerns, to West Sussex Record Office (reference Accession 15353, ‘Hornung Papers’); a collection of records relating to the West Grinstead Stud had previously been deposited at West Sussex Record Office (reference Add Mss 41, 180-41, 211).
