= 1838 in the United Kingdom =

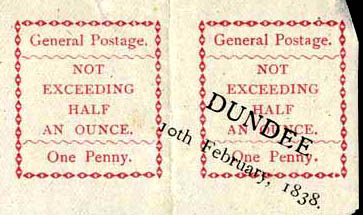
1838 essay by James Chalmers

Events from the year 1838 in the United Kingdom.

== Incumbents ==
- Monarch – Victoria
- Prime Minister – William Lamb, 2nd Viscount Melbourne (Whig)
- Foreign Secretary – Henry John Temple, 3rd Viscount Palmerston
- Home Secretary – Lord John Russell

== Events ==
- 10 January – A fire destroys Lloyd's Coffee House and the Royal Exchange in London.
- 20 January – With a daily average of −11.9 °C (10.6 °F), this day sees the coldest daily Central England temperature value on record.
- 17 March – Four of the pardoned Tolpuddle Martyrs return to England, arriving at Plymouth.
- 4–22 April – The paddle steamer SS Sirius (1837) makes the Transatlantic Crossing to New York from Cork in eighteen days, though not using steam continuously.
- 8–23 April – Isambard Kingdom Brunel's paddle steamer SS Great Western (completed on 31 March) makes the Transatlantic Crossing to New York from Avonmouth in fifteen days, inaugurating a regular steamship service.
- 8 April – The National Gallery first opens to the public in the building purpose-designed for it by William Wilkins in Trafalgar Square, London.
- 1 May – Jenners department store established as drapers in Princes Street, Edinburgh.
- 9 May – Royal Agricultural Society of England founded.
- 21 May – Chartism: The People's Charter is launched by members of the London Working Men's Association at a mass meeting on Glasgow Green calling for universal suffrage for male voters.
- 31 May – Battle of Bossenden Wood: In Kent, self-declared Messiah John N. Thom, calling himself "Sir William Courtenay", and a band of around 35 agricultural labourers are surrounded by soldiers of the 45th Regiment of Foot sent to arrest them following the earlier murder of a policeman. Thom and ten followers, together with an officer and a constable, are killed in what is sometimes described as the last battle on English soil.
- 4 June – The first section of the Great Western Railway, engineered by Isambard Kingdom Brunel, opens from London Paddington station to Maidenhead.
- 18 June – The Newcastle and Carlisle Railway opens, the first line across England.
- 28 June – The Coronation of Queen Victoria takes place at Westminster Abbey. However, Lord Melbourne denies her the traditional medieval banquet due to budget constraints and critics refer to it as "The Penny Crowning". The Imperial State Crown is remade for her.
- July – Chichester Theological College is founded by Bishop William Otter in West Sussex as the first such college of the Anglican Communion in England.
- 4 July – Huskar Pit disaster in the South Yorkshire Coalfield results in the deaths by drowning of 26 children working underground in the mine aged 7 to 17.
- 4 August – The Court Journal prints a rumour that Archibald Montgomerie, 13th Earl of Eglinton is going to host a great jousting tournament at his castle in Scotland. A few weeks later, he confirms this.
- 6 August – The Polytechnic Institution, Britain's first polytechnic, opens in Regent Street, London.
- 16 August – The Tin Duties Act converts the tin coinage taxation system of the mines of Devon and Cornwall into an annual payment to the Duchy of Cornwall.
- 7 September – Grace Darling rescues nine survivors from the wreck of the paddle steamer SS Forfarshire (1834) off the Farne Islands.
- 17 September – The opening of the London and Birmingham Railway throughout, the first trunk line in England.
- 18 September – Anti-Corn Law League founded by Richard Cobden and John Bright in Manchester.
- 24 September – "Monster meeting" on Kersal Moor, Salford, in support of Chartism.
- 1 October – First Anglo-Afghan War begins when Lord Auckland, Governor-General of India, issues a manifesto from Simla giving Britain's reasons for intervening in Afghanistan.

=== Undated ===
- The Peculiar People, a nonconformist Christian movement, is established in Rochford, Essex, by preacher James Banyard.
- Probable date – Hackpen White Horse cut in Wiltshire.

=== Ongoing ===
- Smallpox epidemic of 1837–40.

== Publications ==
- Charles Dickens' novels Oliver Twist (in book form) and The Life and Adventures of Nicholas Nickleby (serialisation begins).
- Lady Charlotte Guest begins publication of her translation into English of the Welsh traditional tales known as the Mabinogion.
- Robert Smith Surtees' collected sporting stories Jorrocks' Jaunts and Jollities.

== Births ==
- 6 February – Henry Irving, actor (died 1905)
- 9 February – Evelyn Wood, field marshal, Victoria Cross recipient (died 1919)
- 12 March – William Henry Perkin, chemist (died 1907)
- 13 April – J. D. Sedding, ecclesiastical architect (died 1891)
- 14 April – John Thomas, Welsh photographer (died 1905)
- 20 July – Sir George Trevelyan, 2nd Baronet, statesman and historian (died 1928)
- 30 September – Emily Soldene, comic opera singer-manager and gossip columnist (died 1912)
- 25 October – Annie Hall Cudlip, novelist, journalist and editor (died 1918)
- 3 December – Octavia Hill, social reformer (died 1912)
- 20 December – Edwin Abbott Abbott, theologian and author (died 1926)

== Deaths ==
- 13 January – John Scott, 1st Earl of Eldon, Lord High Chancellor of Great Britain (born 1751)
- 5 February – Thomas Creevey, politician (born 1768)
- 17 February – John Bonham-Carter, politician and barrister (born 1788)
- 4 March
  - William Fennex, cricketer (born 1763)
  - Sir James Carmichael Smyth, colonial administrator (born 1779)
- 19 March – Sir Edward Barnes, British Army officer and governor of Ceylon (born 1776)
- 21 March – George Ramsay, 9th Earl of Dalhousie, colonial Governor (born 1770)
- 24 March – Thomas Attwood, composer (born 1765)
- 11 May – Thomas Andrew Knight, horticulturalist (born 1759)
- 19 May – Richard Colt Hoare, antiquarian, artist, traveller and archaeologist (born 1758)
- 20 May – William Stephenson, Geordie printer, publisher, auctioneer, poet and songwriter (born 1797)
- 19 July – Christmas Evans, Welsh Nonconformist minister (born 1766)
- 25 August – William Annesley, 3rd Earl Annesley, noble and Member of Parliament (born 1772)
- 18 September – Robert Smith, 1st Baron Carrington, Member of Parliament (born 1752)
- 15 October – Letitia Elizabeth Landon, poet and novelist (born 1802)
- 7 November – Anne Grant, Scottish poet and author (born 1755)
- 16 November – Robert Cutlar Fergusson, lawyer and politician (born 1768)
- 10 December – Augustus Earle, painter (born 1793)
- 22 December – John Villiers, 3rd Earl of Clarendon, Member of Parliament (born 1757)
