= John Sirgood =

British lay preacher

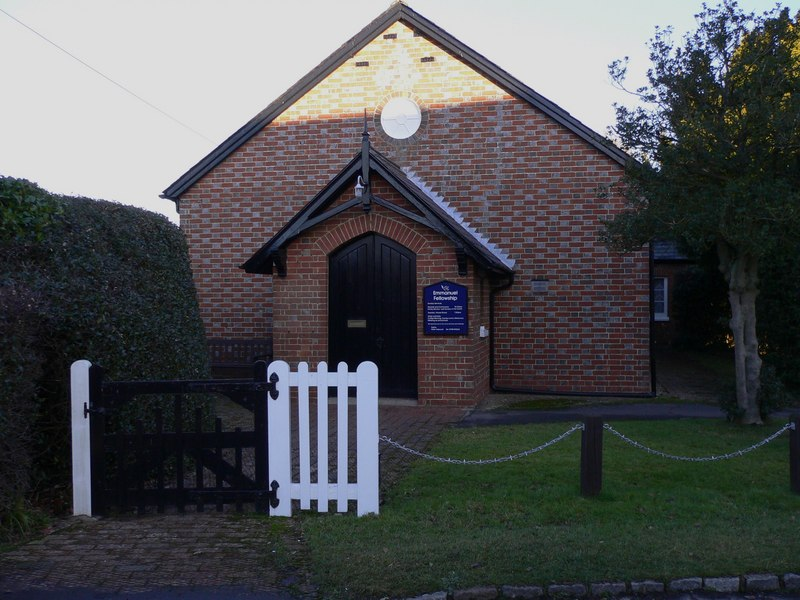
- Loxwood Chapel
- Born: 23 August 1821; Avening, Gloucestershire
- Died: 19 October 1885 (aged 64); Lord's Hill Cottage Loxwood
- Resting place: Emmanuel Chapel, Loxwood, England
- Known for: Society of Dependants
- Spouse: Harriet Coxhead

John Sirgood (1821–1885) was a Christian fundamentalist lay preacher, shoemaker and draper.

== Early life ==
John Sirgood was born in Avening, Gloucestershire on 21 August 1821 into a family of weavers. His father George Sirgood (1789–1865) married Sarah Emmery (1796–1851) on 25 February 1816 in Hilperton, Wiltshire. Sirgood had three brothers, Joseph, Robert and William and a sister Mary. Sirgood is a fairly uncommon spelling of the name (more usually Sargood or Sergood) and appears on page 97 of the Ludus Patronymicus, the Etymology of curious surnames (1868). Census records reveal his father and a branch of the Sirgood family living in Kennington south London in the mid 19th Century, which is where John Sirgood settled sometime during the 1840s. He became a disciple of William Bridges (1802 - 1874) a hat block maker based in Southwark who was leader of the Peculiar People in London from c.1837 and the man Sirgood called his 'father in Gospel'.

It was through Bridges that Sirgood came into contact with James Banyard founder of the Peculiar People, a populist sect originally known as the Banyardites that was primarily based in Essex. Both Bridges and Banyard owed a debt to Robert Aitken (1800–1873) whose 'Christian Society' provided a source for Latter Day Saints converts.

Sirgood was originally a fundamentalist preacher with the Peculiar People in Southwark. He evangelized on Clapham Common and around south London, preaching during the winter in "private houses". He married Harriet Coxhead (1811 - 1876) from Godalming in Surrey at St Mary-at-Lambeth on 17 March 1845 and worked as a shoemaker out of 9 Market Place, Bromells Rd, Clapham. Witnessing the growing popularity of the Peculiar People (that reached its peak circa 1850), Sirgood grew disillusioned with the response to his own preaching; his ambition and fervour made him "long" for a rural following of his own. In a 1942 article Donald Macandrew asserted that Sirgood received inspiration from heaven when he began to "ask the Lord" for guidance. Sometime in 1850 the Lord answered him "in a dream" and told him about "certain remote places in Sussex" where he might find a following. The next morning he and his wife shut up shop and the couple took turns pushing each other in a "wheelbarrow" on the 41-mile trek from London to Loxwood in Sussex. This unusual mode of transport was necessary because Sirgood "couldn't afford the train fare".

== The Society of Dependants a.k.a. The Cokelers ==
Following closely in the footsteps of Banyard and Bridges, Sirgood began his own mission in fields and barns on common lands near the Surrey/Sussex border. He did this in an area outside the control of the large estates whose Anglican owners would not have let him use their lands or premises. His evangelism appealed mainly to the poor labourers, small farmers and tradesmen, attracted by Sirgood's obvious ability as a preacher. Shortly after his arrival a small religious group of 4 or 5 people began to meet in his cottage every Sunday and on sometimes on weekdays. They held their services under the guidance of "Brother John" and these early disciples became known as "elders or stalwarts".

Sirgood was overtly critical of the Anglican Church, and the inequality of 19th-century society in general, which led to his movement being harassed by the gentry and threatened by outraged parish authorities. Church efforts to stop Sirgood were thwarted by the repeal of the Conventicle Act but action by others resulted in evictions and the sackings of servant girls and labourers. Notice was served on Sirgood by his landlord who informed him that unless he discontinued the "unlawful meetings" he would be prosecuted "without difficulty according to law". Macandrew records that Sirgood was accused of saying "all parsons should go to hell" but he denied this libel, although he did write that "parsons were wicked men" who were to his mind "worse than highwaymen". Sirgood replied to his landlord, a magistrate and a member of parliament, advising the man that the fewer properties he owned, the more he would be free from "care, anxiety and responsibility". Various sources contend that the bolshie evangelist had "socialistic" tendencies but the Dependents appear to have been a spiritual movement rather than a political one. Sirgood it seems had his "eyes set firmly on another world". However, his followers lived in an extremely temperate manner and practised a type of Christian communism in the 'Stores' and farms they established. This working class Antinomian religious sect called themselves Dependants because they believed themselves dependant on God for everything. Sirgood led both himself and his followers out of poverty by means of dissidence, dissent and Christ's Combination Stores...."Where competition is defied".

Quite early in their history the Society of Dependants acquired the soubriquet Cokelers, possibly because an 'obscure Sussex joke' made by their opponents and neighbours stuck to them, or because Sirgood relentlessly promoted Cocoa drinking in place of alcohol. In his Dictionary of Sects (1873) John Henry Blunt spelt Cokelers as 'Coglers' and 'Coplers' and refers to a Book of Cople supposedly written by Sirgood (whose name the learned gentleman did manage to spell correctly). The book was said to be "in imitation of the Mormonites" but Edward Turnour, 6th Earl Winterton wrote in Sept 1904 that Blunt gave no account of who supplied him with his erroneous information; no trace has yet been found of a Book of Cople. There is little evidence of Sirgood's actual teachings, although the influence of men like Aitken, Bridges and Banyard must have shaped his thought; he seems to have been a millenarian, commenting once "even the professors [Sic] will acknowledge that this is the last time or the latter days". Early Dependant Hymns do convey some sense of the imminence of Christ's return. Whatever their beliefs, by means of co-operation the Dependents were able to open their first chapel at Loxwood in 1861. Although Sirgood was a married man he did not encourage his followers to marry and very many Dependants remained "free for Christ's sake". They also became notorious for their communal living and in later years for pacifism. Although the Peculiar People practised Faith healing, Sirgood "would not make faith-healing part of his creed". However, it is claimed by Donald MacAndrew in a 1942 article that on one occasion the preacher "raised the dead" and that he and the 'elders' had "prodigious gifts" for healing.

== Later life ==
For many years Sirgood spent weeks at a time in Sussex and elsewhere but still retained links with south London where his father George died at Kennington in October 1865. He was still based at Clapham and can be found in the 1867 Post Office Directory and 1875 electoral records. Sirgood continued to grow 'his flock' and saw the building of many Chapels and Stores in West Sussex and Surrey. It was following the death of his wife Harriet in 1876, aged 66, at Hambledon, Surrey that Sirgood finally left London and settled permanently at Loxwood. In the 1881 census he is listed as a 'draper' lodging in a cottage with William Hamshire at Lord's Hill Common.

== Death ==
When John Sirgood died on 19 October 1885 at Lords Hill Cottage Loxwood, his sect had about two thousand followers. The man who arrived penniless in a wheelbarrow in 1850 left £575, 5s, 6d (£51,000 in 2017) in his will. In keeping with Dependent practise the money was passed to a member of the sect; one of Sirgood's first disciples the elder stalwart Henry Piper. Only a handful of Dependents remained alive by the 1990s, living at "The Retreat" in Spy Lane Loxwood near their first Chapel. In the little burial ground is the final (unmarked) resting place of the Dependent "Saint" John Sirgood.
