= Robert Aitken (preacher) =

Scottish preacher (1800–1873)

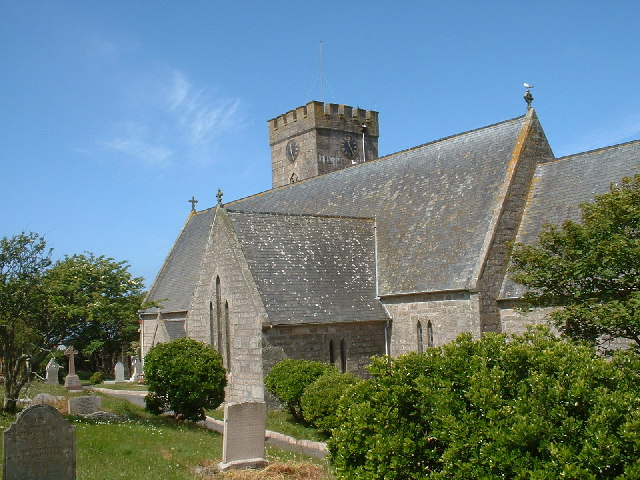
- The Church of St John, Pendeen, Cornwall
- Born: 22 January 1800; Jedburgh, Scotland
- Died: 22 September 1873 (aged 73); Paddington, London
- Resting place: Family vault, St John's, Pendeen
- Known for: The Christian Society
- Spouses: Anna Elizabeth Eyers (m. 1824; died 1836) Wilhelmina Day McDowall-Grant (m. 1845)
- Children: 8: 6 with A.E. Eyres; 2 with W. D. M. Grant

Robert Aitken (22 January 1800 – 22 September 1873) was a Scottish popular preacher who formed 'The Christian Society', with his following primarily drawn from Methodist and Anglican believers, promoting a mix of evangelism and tractarianism.

== Early life ==
Born in Scotland to Calvinist parents, he attended the University of Edinburgh but, according to his son the Rev. William Hay Aitken (1836–1911), he left without graduating. While still relatively young, Aitken became a school-master in Sunderland and, whilst living in the nearby village of Whitburn, was ordained by Bishop William Van Mildert in 1823 as a deacon in the Church of England.

He was, for some time, resident in the Isle of Man, living near Douglas at 'Kirby Cottage' in Braddan. He married his first wife, Anna Elizabeth Eyres (1804–1836), around this time and they had six children together. She was the daughter of Lt Col William Eyres (1782–1847), a wealthy manufacturer of soap, and Elizabeth Simpson (1781–1863). Anna had tuberculosis and Aitken's mother-in-law came to the Island to join them and their growing family. In 1829 they bought substantial land at Crosby called Ballyemin, later renamed Eyreton in honour of his wife. Aitken's style of preaching caused him to clash with the Bishop of Chester and he lost his curacy. Following sixteen days of fasting and prayer Aitken underwent a "spectacular conversion" and, c. 1833–4, he left the Church of England.

He associated himself with the Wesleyan Methodists as a "freebooting revivalist" and, "guided by the hand of God", began the first of several building projects. He designed Crosby Wesleyan Methodist Chapel (the land for which was given by his mother-in-law for five shillings). Aitken and his mother-in-law may have paid for, or helped pay for, the building work. Opened in 1833, the Chapel was still standing in 2017. In 1833 Aitken designed and built 'Eyreton Castle' where he opened a school, run on exclusively religious grounds; in 1834 the first prospectus had the motto "Holiness unto the Lord". It later became a boarding school and then a farm. The castle ruin can still be seen today. Aitken was never received into the Wesleyan Methodist Connexion and ministry; in 1834–5 his requests for formal recognition by Conference were denied but he was permitted to occupy Methodist pulpits by the Wesleyan Methodist Association, a splinter group. He remained in sympathy with them until the Warren controversy arose in 1835; the conservative Jabez Bunting seems to have always viewed Aitken as a divisive figure who was inimical to his own ambitions. Aitken was clearly a preacher of tremendous eloquence and power.

== The Christian Society ==
Having been rebuffed by Conference, Aitken formed 'The Christian Society' in Liverpool in December 1835; "separating himself from all sects and religious bodies" he became an evangelical revivalist taking some of the Methodist Association leaders and members with him. The Society was based on a merger of Anglican and Methodist polities, and mixed evangelism with tractarianism, preaching "the glorious gospel of Holiness and the New Birth". In 1836 he built Hope Hall in Liverpool as his headquarters; it was here he had his largest following, numbering 1,500 by 1837. His followers were called 'Aitkenites' who responded wildly to his Pentecostal evangelism, and his themes of ancient prophesies and the imminence of Christ's return. Described as "jumpers and ranters" there were reports of "frenzied revivalist activities" in the vaults of Hope Hall. (Hope Hall was ceded to the Church of England in May 1841 and later became the Everyman Theatre.)

Following the death of his wife Anna, in late 1836 Aitken left the Christian Society and Hope Hall in the hands of the Rev. John Bowes; between 1837 and 1839 he continued his mission in the open air at Lambeth and in Spitalfields at White's Row Chapel. In Lambeth he preached outside a hotel, which so angered the proprietor that he arranged for some men to harass Aitken. A few days later the proprietor and his wife died suddenly; emboldened, Aitken believed that "God was his upholder".

At White's Row, Aitken (a strict teetotaller) had an enormous impact upon two Methodist local preachers, William Bridges and James Banyard, the men who founded the Peculiar People. It was through Bridges that Aitken's message reached John Sirgood founder of the Society of Dependents. The restoration of a church in latter days was one of Aitken's most prominent themes and chapels were also established at Preston, Manchester and Burslem. In Preston in 1838 Aitken began losing members to the newly arrived Mormon missionaries. He asked the Lord to "smite" their leaders but his combative stance seems to have worked against him; the Christian Society membership proved to be a great source of Latter Day Saints converts.

On 11 July 1839, he married again, to Wilhelmina Day McDowall-Grant (1806–1886) and together they had two children, including William Hay Aitken who later became a clergyman. Wilhelmina was the daughter of Royal Navy Capt. David McDowall-Grant (1761–1841) and Eleanor Frances Murray (1753–1775). Shortly after his marriage Aitken applied to the Bishop of Chester for re-instatement in active ministry; he was given a three-year probationary period "to prove his worthiness and serious intent". He finally, on 20 December 1840, took leave of his congregation at Zion Chapel, Waterloo Road, Liverpool, and returned to the Church of England.

== Later life ==
In 1841 he was briefly at St James in Leeds and officiated from 1842 to 1844 as curate of the small parish of Perranuthnoe, near Marazion, in Cornwall, and then became the first incumbent of the new parish of Pendeen in the same county. In this remote district, on the Atlantic coast, he designed and had built, under his supervision, a cruciform church on the model of Iona Abbey, the labour being supplied by miners and people of the neighbourhood, chiefly in their leisure hours. He was "anchored" here and never held any other preferment. Aitken was visited at Pendeen by the young William Booth (founder of the Salvation Army) and William Haslam. Haslam later recognised his debt to Aitken in the book From Death Unto Life. He was still a distinctive figure and was compared in style and looks to Robert Stephen Hawker, also known as "Hawker of Morwenstow".

== Death ==
Aitken was returning to Pendeen from a short holiday when he died suddenly on the Great Western Railway platform at Paddington station on 11 July 1873. He is buried in the family vault at Pendeen.

== Robert Aitken from the Dictionary of National Biography 1885–1900 ==
Aitken's services were often sought by the incumbents of other churches in large towns, and he was well known throughout England as a fervent preacher. A fine presence and a commanding voice, combined with untiring zeal and sympathy for others, concealed rashness of judgment. His religious creed was taken partly from the teachings of the Methodist church, and partly from the views of the Tractarians: he wished the one class to undergo the process of 'conversion', the other to be imbued with sacramental beliefs. Whether his opinions were in accord with the principles of the established church or not, was fiercely disputed both before and after his death. His sermons and pamphlets, as well as the replies which they provoked, are described at length in the first and third volumes of Bibliotheca Cornubiensis.
