= William Bridges (preacher) =

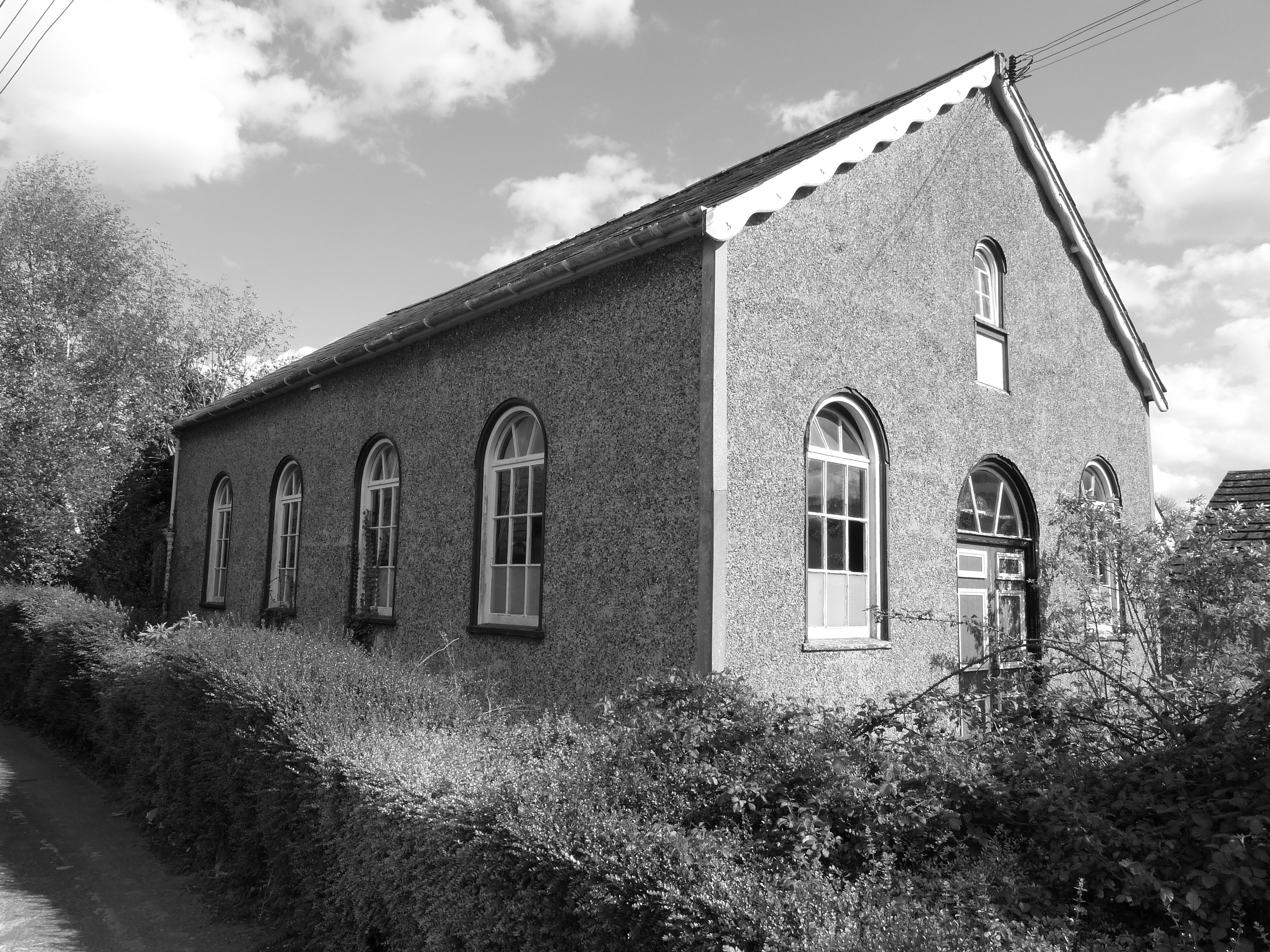
- Born: William Bridges; 1802; Woodbridge, Suffolk, England
- Died: 27 February 1874 (aged 71–72); Lambeth, England
- Resting place: West Norwood Cemetery London
- Known for: Peculiar People
- Spouse: Ann Siggers (m. 1824–1874)
- Children: 5

William Bridges (1802–1874) was a Methodist local preacher, hat block maker and founder of the Plumstead Peculiar People.

== Early life ==
William Bridges was born in Woodbridge, Suffolk to John Bridges (1761–1841), and Mary Block (1761– ), he was baptised at St Mary, Woodbridge on 8 May 1802. His father is listed as a Wheelwright on the 1841 census, aged 80, and still living in Suffolk. Little else is known about Bridges very early years. By 1824 at the time of his marriage to Ann Siggers (1800–1882) he was living in South London, at 8 Gravel Lane Southwark, working as a hat block turner (lathe worker). Bridges remained a hat block maker for over 50 years; it was a trade that required considerable woodworking skills, perhaps learnt from his father. The area of Southwark St Saviour near the Thames close to Blackfriars Bridge had been the traditional home of hat making since the days of Queen Elizabeth, so he was well placed to make a living. At some point during the early 1830s Bridges became a Methodist local preacher.

== Influence of Robert Aitken, meeting with James Banyard ==
In 1837 Bridges witnessed the fiery ex-Anglican Robert Aitken preaching at White's Row Chapel in Shoreditch which proved to be a crucial turning point in his life. Bridges was inspired to begin his own mission and installed a tiny chapel in an upper room at Gravel Lane. In 1838 Bridges visited his sister at Rochford and it was here he met James Banyard. Subsequently, Banyard visited Bridges in Southwark and was also deeply moved by Aitken's evangelism. Banyard was "born again" at Gravel Lane and returned to Essex a changed man. He went on to found the Peculiar People of Essex.

Bridges was closely involved in the sect's early years in Rochford, and helped Banyard found his first chapel there in 1842. In the late 1840s Bridges inspired John Sirgood who went on to found his own rural sect the Society of Dependants aka 'The Cokelers' in Sussex. Banyard and Bridges believed in faith healing and strictly forbade the use of doctors; this would later lead to trials and imprisonment for some members of their congregation when they came into conflict with the authorities. Banyard was later estranged from his own movement in 1855, due to a change of heart over the calling in of a Doctor for his own sick child.

== Later life. Plumstead Peculiars, Walworth Jumpers and child death controversies ==
In 1868 the first Peculiars were convicted of neglect during the "Wagstaffe Case". At the inquest (which was held at the Crown Tavern on Blackfriars Road) a local church elder was called to give evidence; it is entirely possible the man who stated that "physic (medicine) killed a great many people" was Bridges himself. Although the London coroner concluded that "the age for miracles was past"; the Peculiar People did not concede this point for many years.

In his book Forgotten Thameside (1951), Glyn H. Morgan asserts that the "alternative and now seldom heard name Plumstead Peculiars" was due to its "place of origin". Even though Bridges always lived and worked in Southwark and Walworth, the Plumstead Peculiars had meeting houses in both Woolwich and Plumstead; census and electoral records confirm that by the mid-1850s Bridges niece Maria Syer (1821–1887) and her husband William Thomas Syer (1816–1891) were living at Maxey Rd, Plumstead. Maria was the daughter of Bridges sister Mary Ann (who spent her final years in Plumstead) and Maria seems to have been a prominent member of the sect; she is easily identified as the "Elder Sister" interviewed by the Rev C. Maurice Davies in his book Unorthodox London. (The pub visited by Davies, the Windsor Castle, once stood in Maxey Rd).

The chapter in Unorthodox London devoted to the Plumstead Peculiars was written at the time of the "Hurry Case" in 1872. Davies gives an interesting insight into the simplistic beliefs espoused by the sect and its predominately working class adherents. With local antipathy towards their movement clearly growing, the Plumstead Peculiars invited the charismatic and controversial Mary Girling to preach for them; perhaps seeing her as another Banyard. It was, however, a move they soon came to regret. Like Bridges, Girling originally came from Suffolk, she had tried preaching to local Methodist's, but met resistance. She began having "visions" and founded her own sect the Girlingites. She worked briefly with the Plumstead Peculiars but fell out with the sect owing to her claims of divinity; she believed she was Jesus Christ, and her followers could become immortal. She managed to take a great many of the Plumstead congregation with her when she began preaching in a railway arch off the Walworth Road where the Walworth Jumpers (or Shakers) made headlines and drew huge crowds. Bridges seems to have been drawn to charismatic figures like Girling, Banyard and Sirgood. Girling eventually decamped with her disciples to the New Forest where the New Forest Shakers endeavoured to live on faith alone. Unlike the more practical Cokelers, Girling's Children of God refused to work and eventually endured great poverty and hardship.

== Death ==
Bridges died aged 72 on 27 February 1874 at 12 Wansey Rd in Newington and was still working as a hat block maker. He was buried at Norwood Cemetery on 5 March 1874. At the time of his death the Peculiar People had 43 chapels, most of them in Essex
