= Barrie Delf =

English footballer

Personal information
- Full name: Barrie Delf
- Date of birth: 5 June 1961 (age 65)
- Place of birth: Rochford, England
- Position: Goalkeeper

Senior career*
| Years | Team | Apps | (Gls) |
- Leigh Ramblers
- Leigh Marshes
- Trinity
| 1983–1986 | Southend United | 1 | (0) |
| 1986–198? | Dartford | | |
| 198?–1992 | Grays Athletic | | |
- * Club domestic league appearances and goals

Barrie Delf (born 5 June 1961) is an English retired professional footballer who played as a goalkeeper for Southend United in The Football League, where he made only one appearance in the Third Division in the 1982–1983 season. After his spell with Southend ended in 1986, Delf went on to play non-League football for Dartford and Grays Athletic.

== Football career ==
Before turning professional, Delf played amateur football for Leigh Ramblers in the Southend Borough Combination League, Leigh Marshes and Trinity whilst working as civil servant for the Department of Social Security. He had a trial with Aston Villa, but Ron Saunders decided against signing him due to Villa having recently taken on an apprentice goalkeeper. BBC Essex sports presenter Roger Buxton, recommended Delf to Southend United chief scout Bob Walls, eventually signing on non-contract terms in 1983. He made a number of reserve team appearances before making his debut on 26 March 1983 in the Football League Third Division for Southend against Sheffield United, in the 3–1 home victory. Southend's regular goalkeepers Mervyn Cawston and John Keeley were both injured, and Delf was drafted in on the morning of the day of the match. The one goal Delf conceded was a penalty kick taken by Colin Morris. He went on to play non-League football for Dartford under Peter Taylor, signing from Southend in 1986, before joining Grays Athletic for whom he made over 300 appearances.

== Life after football ==
Delf went on to work as an IT manager for Castle Point Borough Council after his footballing career.
