= James Banyard =

Preacher, farmer, and shoemaker

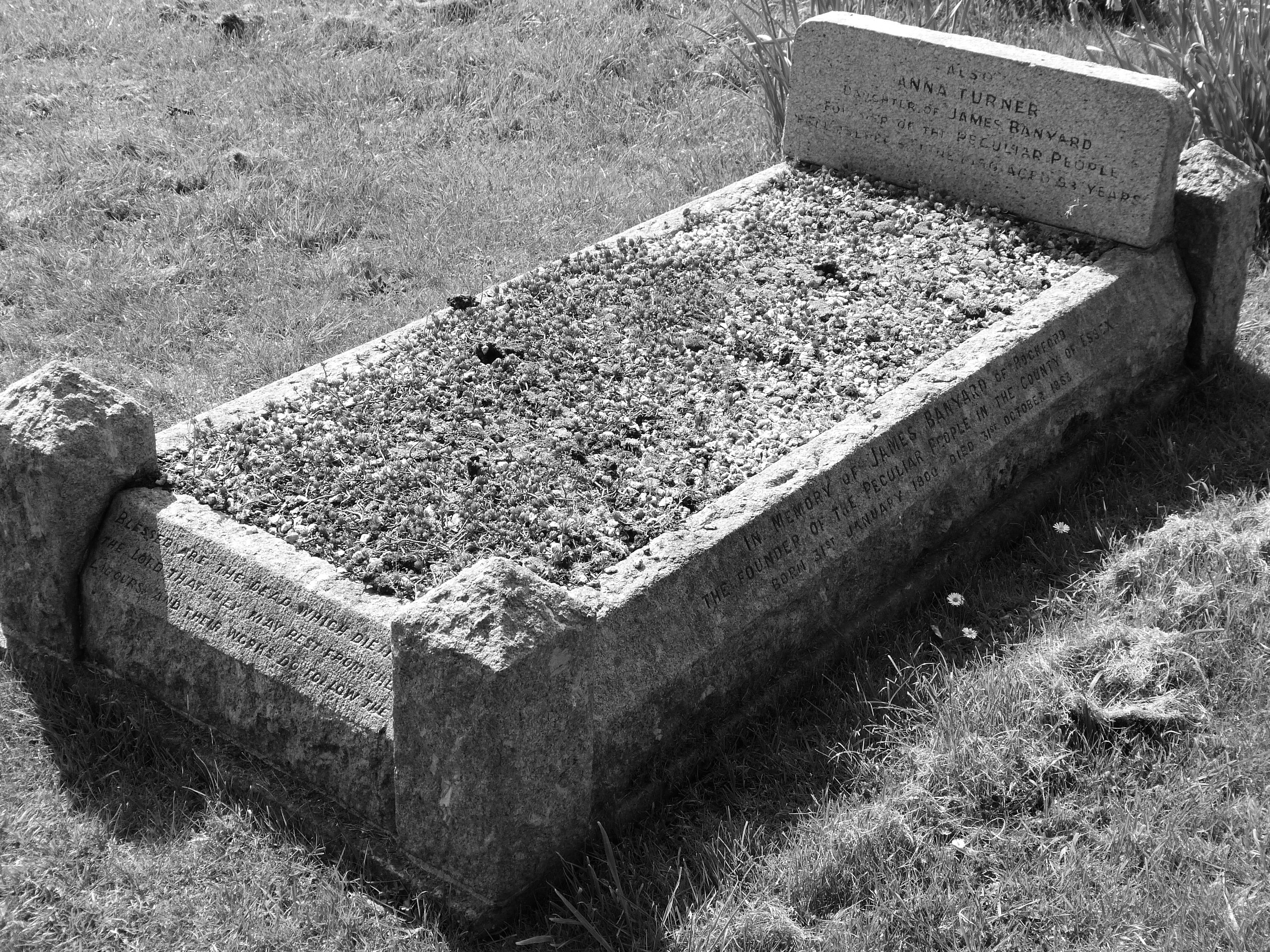
- The Grave of James Banyard
- Born: 14 November 1800; Rochford, Essex, England
- Died: 31 October 1863 (aged 62); Rochford, Essex, England
- Resting place: St Andrew's, Rochford, England
- Known for: The Banyardites Peculiar People
- Spouses: Susan Garnish (m. 1823; died 1844) Judith Knapping née Lucking (m. 1845)
- Children: 7 With Judith Banyard

James Banyard (14 November 1800 – 31 October 1863) was a Wesleyan Methodist local preacher and founder of the Peculiar People. By trade he was a farmer and shoemaker.

== Early life ==
James Banyard was born in the market town of Rochford, Essex. His father, Robert Banyard (1776–1815), worked at Rochford Hall as a ploughman; James also became an agricultural labourer but spent most of his free time carousing in local pubs. Described as "an ugly man" with a loud booming voice, James was charismatic and became a popular local figure thanks to a talent for conjuring tricks, mimicry and topical rhyme. He composed comedy songs called "glees" (unaccompanied songs for men's voices in three or more parts, popular c.1750–1830) and one called "The Syren Wrecked on The West Knock" was still remembered 25 years after his death. He had no time for religion and indulged in heavy alcohol consumption. He was also a poacher for which he was eventually jailed. Whilst in prison he learnt the craft of shoemaking which became his livelihood upon his release. He married Susan Garnish (1802–1844) in around 1826 but continued to lead a dissoloute and argumentative life. By his early thirties his wife began to despair of his drunken behaviour. Following a visit to a local fair she "insisted he reform" and made him promise to attend the local Wesleyan Methodist chapel. The preacher's words had a dramatic effect on Banyard and "a change came over him". He became a strict teetotaller and began going to church regularly. Banyard became a respected member of the Rochford Methodist community and eventually became a preacher at the local chapel himself.

== Influence of Rev. Robert Aitken and meeting William Bridges ==
The Scottish-born Anglican cleric Robert Aitken had left the Church of England in 1834 having been overcome by "the spirit of the Lord". He became an evangelical revivalist and founded his own Christian Society. Between the years 1837 and 1839 the teetotaller Aitken was in London preaching "in the open air" in Lambeth and at Whites Row Chapel in Spitalfields. It was in Spitalfields that a Methodist local preacher and hat block maker from Southwark William Bridges, heard Aitken evangelize on the text Enoch walked with God. Bridges became "a changed man" and in 1837 founded his own tiny religious sect called the Plumstead Peculiars. That same year Bridges visited one of his sisters in Rochford and struck up a friendship with Banyard, swapping ideas and discussing "religious topics". Bridges invited Banyard to stay with him in London and at some point led him to Aitken. Banyard instinctively realised that Aitken and Bridges had "something more than he" and before leaving Bridges' home at 8 Gravel Lane Southwark, is said to have gone to an upstairs room, fallen to his knees and been 'born again'. Bridges would later have a similar influence on the leader of another rural sect, John Sirgood.

== The Banyardites, and The Peculiar People ==
Banyard returned to Rochford and began preaching "Right of Liberty"; believing there was no sin in Christians once they accepted the Holy Spirit in Christianity, he asserted "for to know our sins are forgiven is the first step in religion". Quite soon there was a "dispute" with the Rochford Wesleyan church and Banyard was ejected for refusing to obey instructions. He began open air preaching in Rochford Square and held prayer meetings at his cottage. Banyard was often "drenched with pails of water" and had "filth of all sorts" thrown at him; including "rotten eggs and dead cats"; one of the worst tormentors amongst the intolerant and irreligious was Banyard's embittered former friend, Layzell. In spite of this early opposition his message began to catch on. At first the sect were known simply as The Banyardites. As the congregation grew Banyard and Bridges took over the lease of an old workhouse building known as The Barracks in Rochford circa 1838 and set up their own chapel at Union Lane (near the Marlborough Head Inn).

== Faith healing ==
Shortly after the chapel opened a man called William Perry from Southend arrived at The Barracks "helped by two other men". He was weak with consumption (tuberculosis) and claimed that whilst at prayer he had heard a voice reciting James 5: Verse 14 -15 The Prayer of Faith. Perry believed the preacher could act and an instrument of the Lord and might cure him. At first Banyard was apparently reluctant to indulge in Divine healing saying "it is not for me to dampen your faith, brother"; but eventually "they got on their knees and prayed". The man is said to have recovered and "walked 12 miles that same day". There followed several similar 'miracle cures', including a Charles Porter of Southend who was cured of a liver complaint. These events gave the Banyardites the reputation of a "special people" with special "gifts from God himself". They help explain the phenomenal growth of the movement which 'spread like wildfire" and established chapels in Essex, Kent, and East London. The Banyardites are said to have helped bring order to Daws Heath, an area so notorious that J W. Burrows described it as "a hotbed of lawlessness". In 1848 there was a setback when the "laying on" of Banyard's hands failed to save a child at Prittlewell. On this occasion the anger of the local population saw Banyard "guarded out of the village by the police". This tragic event did not prevent the sect's leaders hiring a hall in Prittlewell in 1850 where they preached on "various occasions". A church 'Elder' Isaac Anderson describes how he was "baptised with water" by Banyard at a "special meeting" held in 1851 at Rochford and "accepted into the church". By this time, with Bridges operating in London, the movement in Essex was too large for one man with a growing family to control. In 1852 the Banyardites officially became the Peculiar People, a name Bridges had taken from the book of Deuteronomy (Deuteronomy 14:2). Banyard and three other men, Samuel Harrod, David Handley and John Thorogood, were ordained as Bishops. (Thorogood's son John Thorogood Jnr, later married Banyard's eldest daughter Hephzibah in October 1868). At this time a constitution was established; there were Bishops, Elders and 'Saints' and their strict code included abstention from alcohol and smoking. The sect adopted a dress code for worship: a dark suit and bowler hat for men, and black capes and bonnets for the women. Their hymns were sung without musical accompaniment, a practice later adopted by the Society of Dependents.

== Later life ==
Susan Banyard had died childless aged 42 in 1844; James remarried in 1845 to the widow Judith Knapping (nee Lucking) (1823 - 1877), and together they had seven children. In 1855 Banyard's fifth child Josiah was born in Rochford. When the boy became seriously ill, Banyard "agonised" at length but eventually a doctor was called in. From this time on, Banyard began to advise the use of prayer and medical attention. This matter led to the first doctrinal schism within the church of the Peculiar People when Banyard was deposed as Bishop. Because he owned the Rochford chapel he continued to preach there to "a loyal minority". Banyard was replaced by Bishop Samuel Harrod (who was deposed himself in 1890 following a sex scandal).

== Death ==
Banyard's decision to seek medical aid for his son, saw him reduced in stature in his own movement for the final eight years of his life. Sadly Josiah died in 1861. James and Judith had a final child together that same year, Tamar Banyard. James Banyard continued to preach until "disease and death silenced him". He died on 31 October 1863; the cause of death is unknown. He was buried in the graveyard of St Andrew's Church, Rochford. In 1877 his wife was laid to rest with him. In 1950, Anna Turner (née Banyard) joined her parents. The inscription reads: "In memory of James Banyard of Rochford. The founder of the Peculiar People in the County of Essex. Born 31 January. Died 31 October 1863."
