= Clements Hall Leisure Centre =

Sports centre in Rochford, Essex, England

Clements Hall Leisure Centre, is a sports centre managed by Everyone Active for Rochford District Council.

The centre has a wetside area, with a 25 m swimming pool, teaching pool, sauna, steam room and Jacuzzi; and a dryside area consisting of a large, fully equipped gym, studios, climbing wall, badminton, squash, volleyball and basketball courts, creche, cafe and an AstroTurf pitch.

It is also the home to Rochford and District Swimming Club.

Everyone Active manage other sites in the area: Rayleigh Leisure Centre;

== Major events ==
In November 2007, lifeguards pulled a man from the pool after he went into cardiac arrest. The man is believed to have fully recovered, thanks to lifeguards, emergency service and hospital staff.

On 22 November 2010, lifeguards resuscitated a man who suffered a heart problem whilst playing football on the astro turf.
