= Lawless Court =

The Lawless Court, formally the King's Court of the Manor of King's Hill, was an English court that began meeting in Kings Hill, Rochford, so called because of the "lawless" time at which it met (midnight). According to tradition, the court was first created some time before 1661, after the Lord of the Manor of King's Hill was woken by a cock crowing, to discover a group of his vassals planning to murder him. Interrupting them, he convicted them of treason, for which their lands would be forfeit. As an act of clemency, he declared that they would be allowed to keep their lands in a state of "shameful service". Each year, the day the plot was discovered (the Wednesday after Old Michaelmas Day), the tenants were to assemble at midnight where the plot was discovered, where the Lord's Steward would whisper out their names as quietly as possible. Those tenants who did not answer to their name would be fined double rent for every hour they failed to do so. The tenants were then obliged to wait there until a cock crowed three times, at which point they were dismissed.

The names of those tenants who answered were entered by the Steward with a piece of charcoal, ink being forbidden; in addition, no candles were allowed, with only natural light being permitted. For its strange procedure, the Court gained a variety of names; most commonly the "Lawless Court", but also "The Whispering Court" and "The Court of Cockcrowing". The Court continued without fail until the 19th century, although it became a tradition only; no prosecutions or litigation ever took place in it, and it is sometimes formally known as the "Curia Sine Lege", or "court without a leet-day". In later years there were many shortcuts in the court's procedure; most tenants simply paid their double rent at the Steward's office in the morning, preferring this to standing around in the damp, and a local man was employed to make the noise of a cock crowing after the court's business had been concluded.

== Bibliography ==
- Kenny, Courtney (1905). "The Lawless Court of Essex". Columbia Law Review. 5 (7). Columbia Law School: 529–536. doi:10.2307/1109762. ISSN 0010-1958. JSTOR 1109762.
- Tayler, Thomas (1855). The law glossary: being a selection of the Greek, Latin, Saxon, French, Norman, and Italian sentences, phrases, and maxims (4th ed.). Lewis & Blood. OCLC 14002394.
