= Northchapel =

Village and parish in West Sussex, England

Coordinates: 51.0572°N 0.64288°W

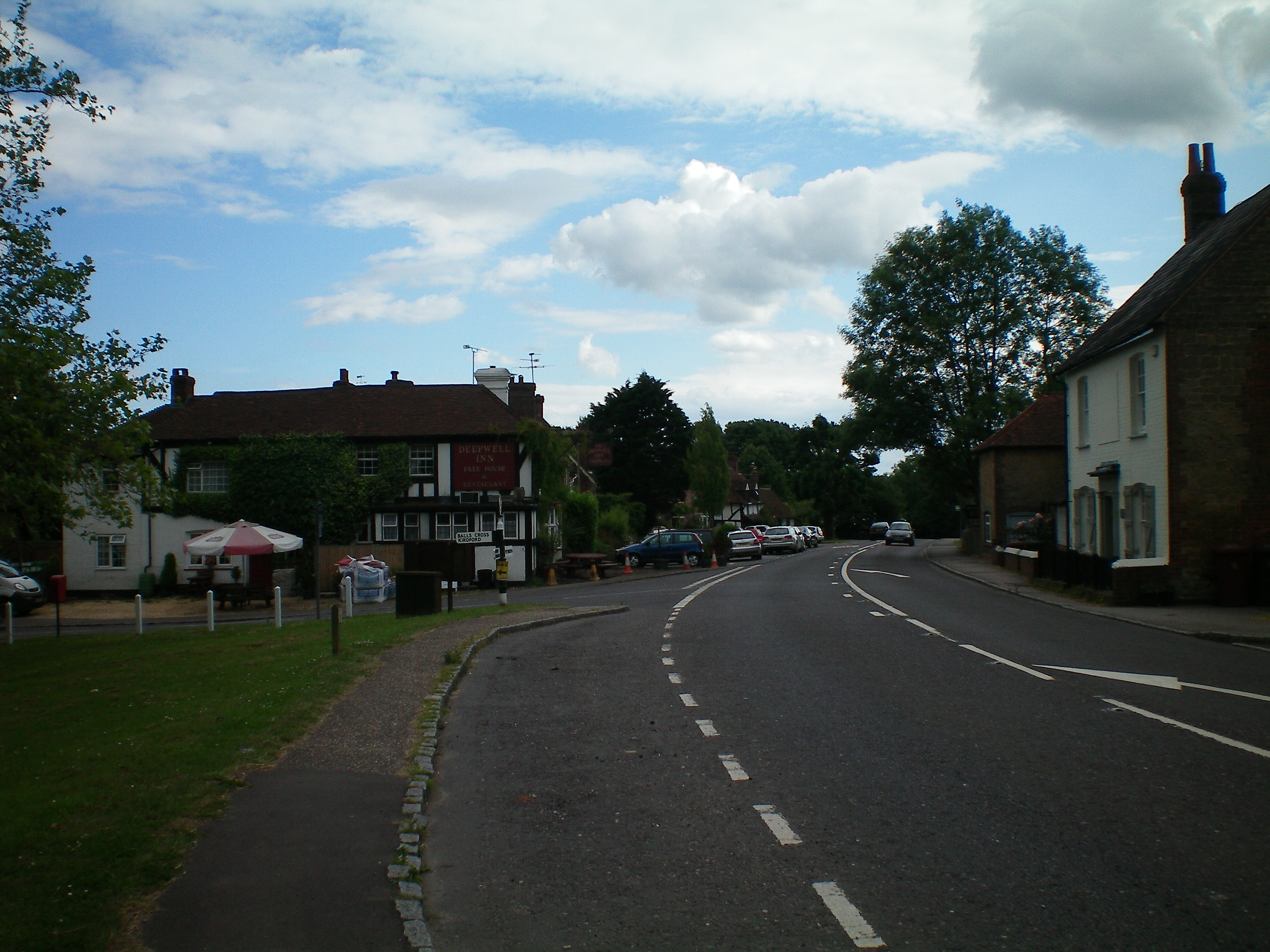
- The village centre

- Location within West Sussex
- Area: 13.62 km^{2} (5.26 sq mi)
- Population: 806 2021 Census
  - Density: 60/km^{2} (160/sq mi)
- OS grid reference: SU952295
  - London: 38 miles (61 km) NE
- Civil parish: Northchapel
- District: Chichester
- Shire county: West Sussex
- Region: South East
- Country: England
- Sovereign state: United Kingdom
- Post town: PETWORTH
- Postcode district: GU28
- Dialling code: 01428
- Police: Sussex
- Fire: West Sussex
- Ambulance: South East Coast
- UK Parliament: Chichester
- Website: http://northchapel.org/

Northchapel is a village and civil parish in Chichester District in West Sussex, England. Situated on the A283 road just south of the Surrey border, around 9 km north of Petworth.

The village is believed to have taken its name from a church which was once a chapelry and was the north chapel of the Manor of Petworth, originally two separate words, North and Chapel.

== History ==
The earliest known human settlement is an Iron Age camp at Piper's Copse, the only one found on low ground in Sussex. The rampart is over 8 feet (2.4 m) high in places and almost circular, enclosing an area of just over 1-acre (0.40 ha). Iron Age pottery and iron slag have been found on the site. Roman and medieval pottery have also been found at Pipers Copse.

Following the Saxon conquest of Sussex in the late 5th century AD it is likely that the Northchapel area, like much of the wet clay areas of the low Weald was used as summer pasture and pannage for pigs by people from Saxon villages along the coastal plain. These summer wood pastures are called "outliers". The ending "fold" in names such as Diddlesfold and Frithfold indicates the presence of animal enclosures for this purpose.

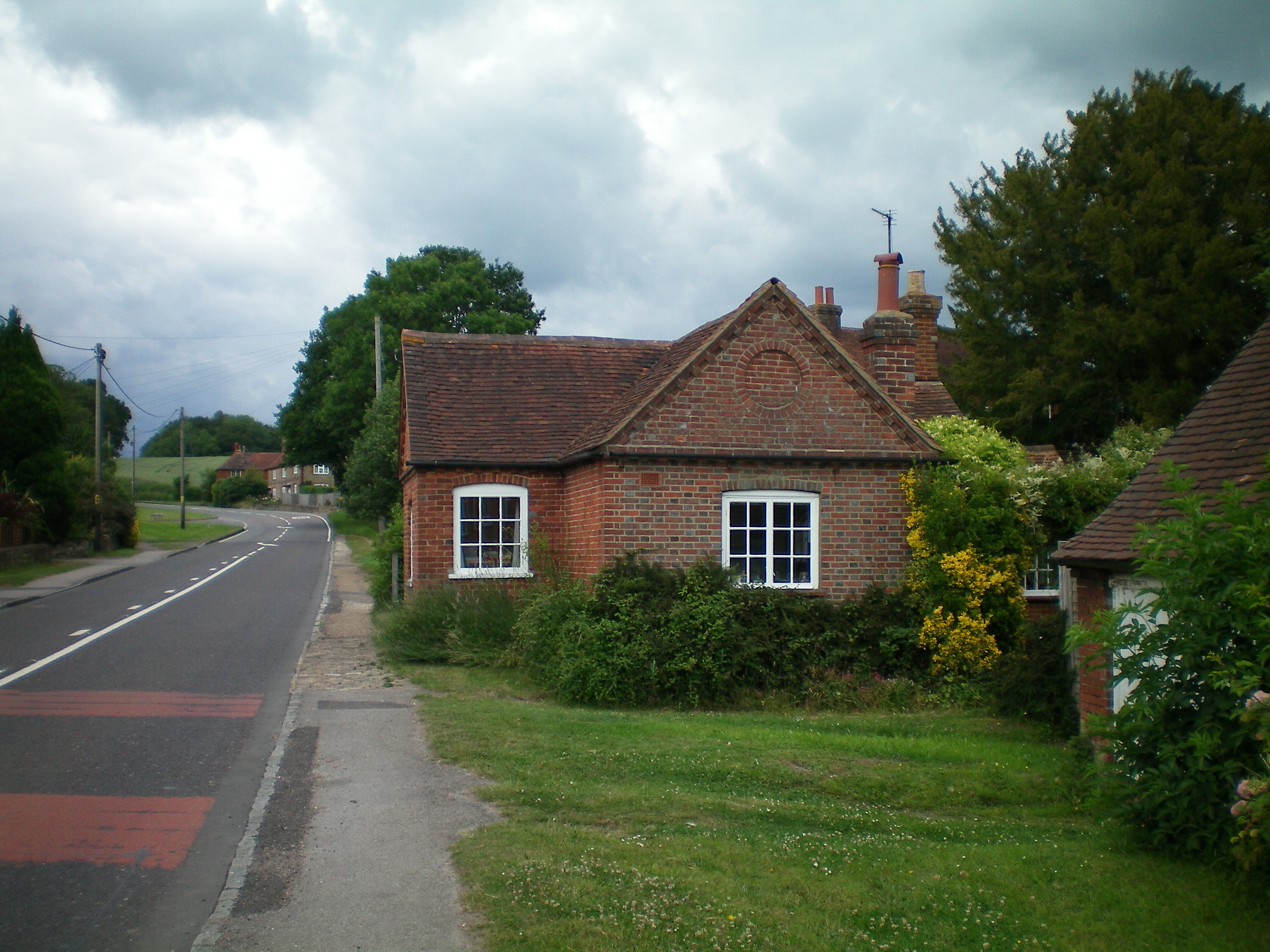
The former toll house on the A283

When the Domesday Book was compiled after the Norman Conquest the area did not get mentioned as any separate entity from the Manor of Petworth. There would now have been more permanent settlement with small fields being cleared from forest and bounded by ditches and laid hedges. From the mid-12th century the Manor of Petworth was held by the Percy family, the powerful and often rebellious Earls of Northumberland. These lords had an enclosed deer park at Mitchell Park, then called Micel (great) Park, where records indicate there was a hunting lodge with gardens and orchards. There were two water mills near Colhook, grinding corn. Diddlesfold Manor was given to the Abbey of Reading, and lands near Gospel Green were given to Shulbrede Priory.

Today the parish is a tranquil area of farms and woodlands, but in medieval times it was bustling with industry. Forest glassmaking was a speciality of the western weald, using local sand and potash made from bracken or wood ash and large quantities of fire wood. In the 1560s French Huguenot glassmakers brought improved techniques to the area. The remains of a kiln that produced high quality window glass in the 17th century have been uncovered at Tanlands Copse.

Competing for firewood with glassmakers were the ironmasters, using continental technology in the Tudor and Stuart periods, to smelt iron from locally dug ironstone in water powered blast furnaces. The streams fed by springs on Blackdown were dammed to drive waterwheels which worked large twin bellows. Other waterwheels drove large forge hammers which converted the pig iron into wrought iron. There was a furnace north of Frith Wood and a forge hammer by Hammer Bridge at Mitchell Park.

In the 1790s the government bought land at Fisherstreet from the third Earl of Egremont to set up a factory for producing high quality charcoal by using coal to heat wood, mainly willow, alder and alder buckthorn, in iron cylinders. Tar, methyl alcohol and acid were distilled into wooden barrels leaving high quality charcoal needed by gunpowder mills to produce improved black powder for the Napoleonic Wars. The works had closed by 1826 and in 1828 the site was used for a large gala and illegal prize fight by bare-knuckle boxers from London. By 1839 the site had become a tannery where cattle hides were soaked in liquid made from ground up oak tree bark for many months, a very smelly process.

Brick making was another important industry, with the brickworks at Colhook Common being established by 1779 and continuing until the 1960s. Both red and yellow clay were available on the common, and sand nearby, as well as plenty of firewood for firing the bricks. These materials were dug and cut during the winter and the actual brick making done in the summer when the clay would dry before firing.

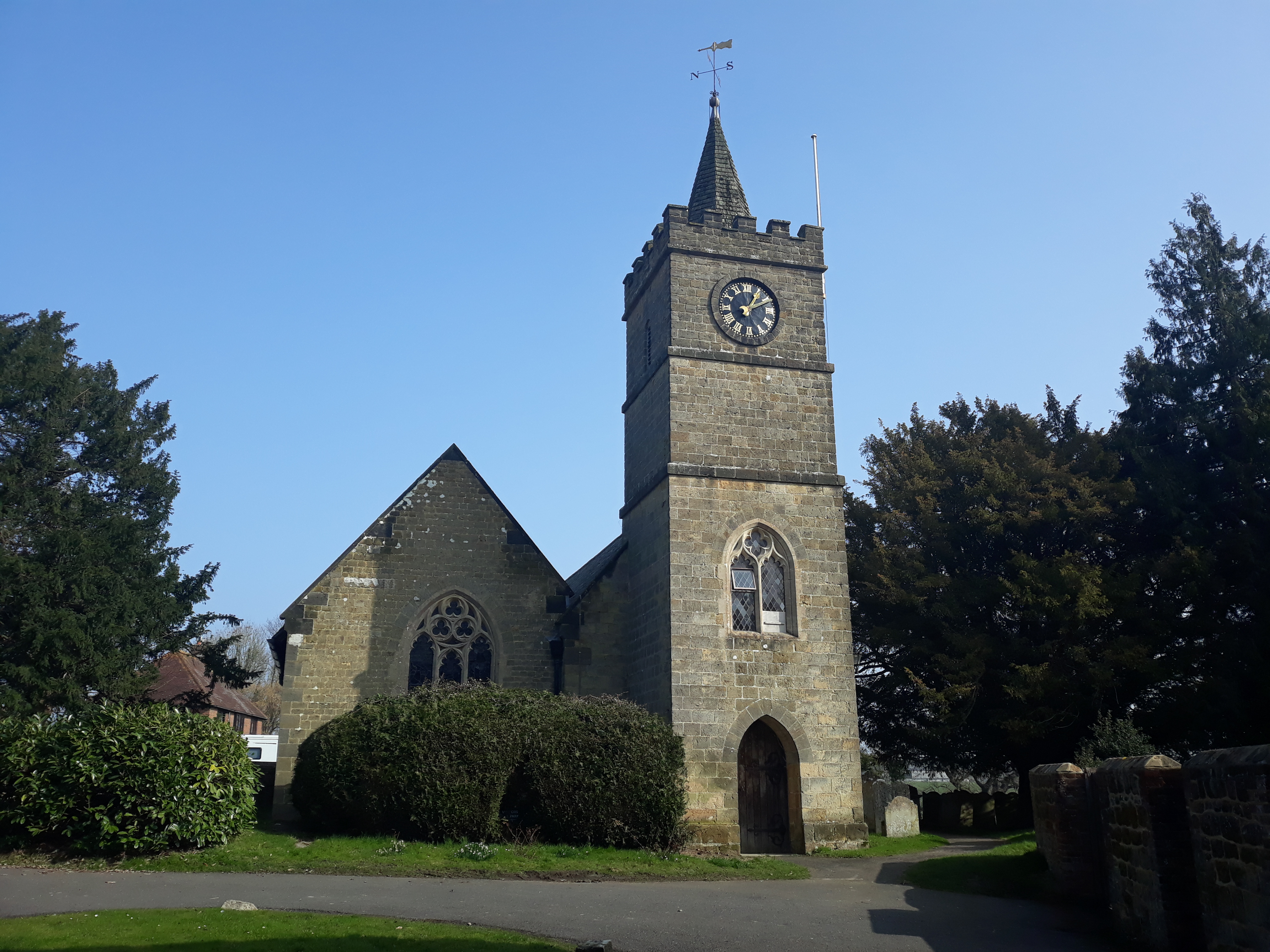
St Michael and All Angels' Church, Northchapel

Northchapel, along with Duncton, became a separate parish from Petworth in 1717. The present parish church of St. Michael and all Angels was built in 1878 retaining the tower of the 1833 church which replaced the first stone church, probably built in the 14th century. It contains some interesting stained glass windows by Wilhelmina Geddes from 1930. A surviving drawing shows the early church as a simple stone building with a Horsham stone roof and wooden bell tower.

As well as the Anglican parish church of St Michael there was the chapel of the Society of Dependants, built in 1872 behind the present village shop and now a private dwelling. The shop itself began as a cooperative venture by the society. The Dependants, an independent Christian sect, had a strong presence in the village. They were commonly known as "Cokelers" possibly from "Cuckolders", a slander by their religious enemies.

Education for the ordinary people began in 1835 with the building of a free Sunday School at the junction with the lane to Hillgrove, using government money channelled through the Church of England. in 1849 this was extended to become a Church of England day school, giving a free basic education in literacy and numeracy and having emphasis on religious indoctrination. By the early 20th century the building was considered inadequate by the County Council and the site unhealthy as they were pumping water from the sewage polluted stream. The clergy were unable to retain control by making the necessary improvements so a new council run school was built by the village green, opening in 1916, and still in use today as the primary school.

Alongside the primary school is the Working Men's Club, founded in 1924 as a memorial to the villagers killed in the First World War. A Canadian Army hut was moved from Aldershot for the club. The club was extended and renovated in 1977.

== Sources ==
- Pamela Bruce, Northchapel A Parish history.
