= Rochford =

Town in England

Coordinates: 51.582071°N 0.706515°E

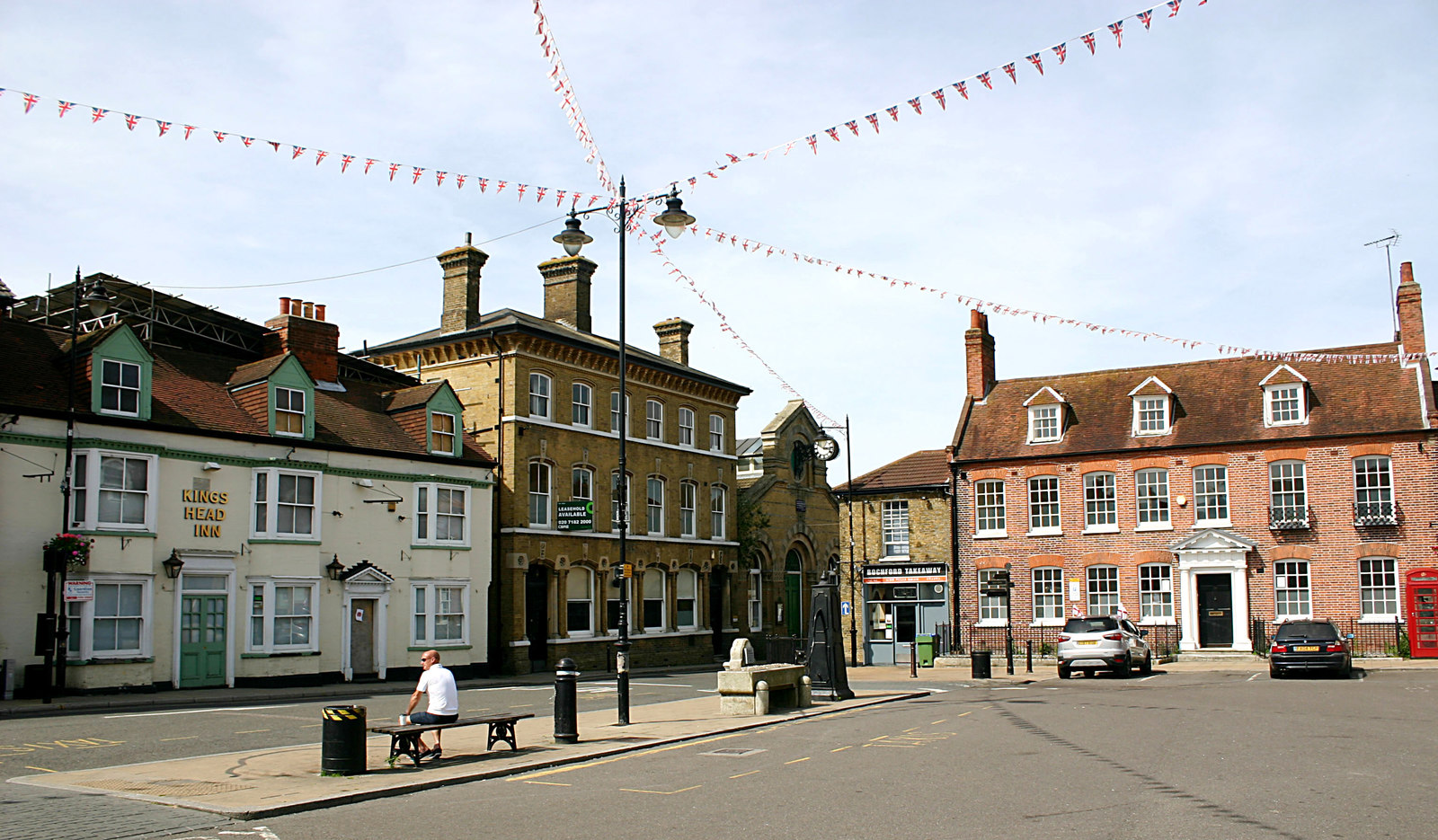
- Town Square, Rochford

- Location within Essex
- Population: 9,889 (Parish, 2021); 12,615 (Built up area, 2021)
- OS grid reference: TQ876904
- Civil parish: Rochford
- District: Rochford
- Shire county: Essex
- Region: East
- Country: England
- Sovereign state: United Kingdom
- Post town: Rochford
- Postcode district: SS4
- Dialling code: 01702
- Police: Essex
- Fire: Essex
- Ambulance: East of England
- UK Parliament: Southend East and Rochford

Rochford is a town and civil parish in Essex, England. It lies 3 miles (4.8 km) north of Southend-on-Sea, 43 miles (69 km) from London and 21 miles (34 km) from Chelmsford. At the 2021 census the parish had a population of 9,889 and the Rochford built up area had a population of 12,615. It gives its name to the wider Rochford District, which also covers an extensive surrounding area.

== History ==
The town is the main settlement in the Rochford district, and takes its name from Rochefort, Old English for "Ford of the Hunting Dogs". Kings Hill, in Rochford, was notable for containing the Lawless Court up until the 19th century.

=== Peculiar People ===
In 1837, James Banyard (14 November 1800 – 1863) (a reformed drunk and Wesleyan preacher) and William Bridges (1802–1874) took a lease on the old workhouse at Rochford, which became the first chapel of the Peculiar People, a name taken from Deuteronomy 14:2 and 1 Peter 2:9. The Peculiar People practised a lively form of worship bound by the literal interpretation of the King James Bible, banning both frivolity and medicine. During the two World Wars, some were conscientious objectors, believing that war is contrary to the teachings of Jesus Christ. The Peculiar People are nowadays known as the Union of Evangelical Churches.

=== First World War ===
Nearby Southend Airport started life as a grass fighter station in World War I. The site was founded in the autumn of 1914 when farmland between Westbarrow Hall and the Great Eastern Railway line at Warners Bridge 2.5 miles (4 km) north of Southend Pier was acquired for RFC training purposes. Training continued until May 1915 when the site, known also as Eastwood, was taken over by the RNAS to become a Station (night) in the fight against intruding Zeppelins.

=== Second World War ===
Southend Airport was opened on the site on 18 September 1935. As World War II approached it was requisitioned by the Air Ministry in August 1939 for use as a fighter airfield by No.11 Group RAF. RAF Rochford was a satellite station for RAF Hornchurch and was primarily a fighter base, home mainly to Supermarine Spitfire and Hawker Hurricane aircraft. Rochford airfield was accompanied by a radar base in Canewdon (around 4 miles (6.4 km) away). RAF Rochford was bombed a number of times during the war.

It was returned to civilian service on 31 December 1946.

== Geography ==
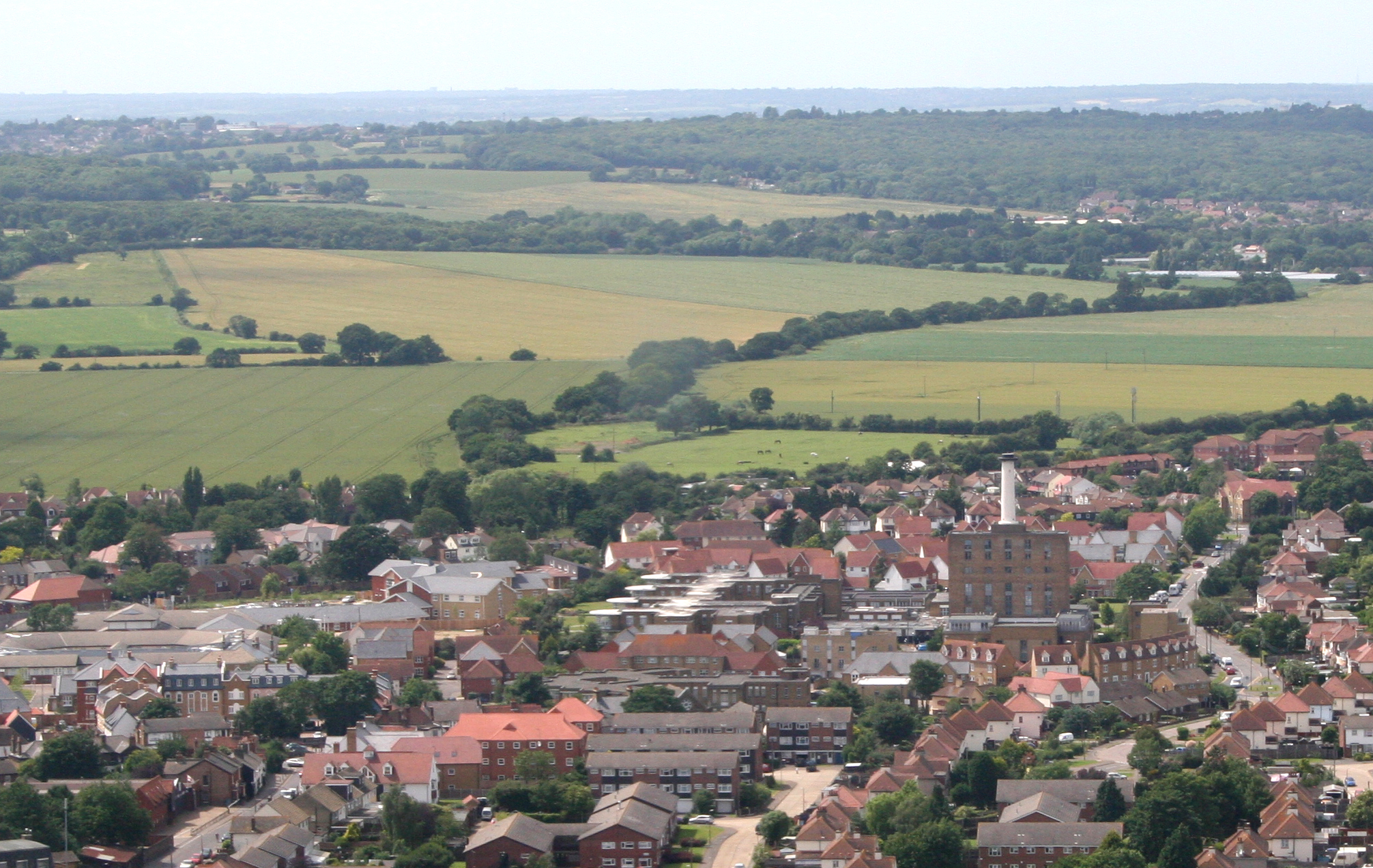
Aerial photo over Rochford. The old hospital boilerhouse can be seen.

The town is just to the north of Southend-on-Sea, and is separated from both Southend and Rayleigh.

The built up area of Rochford as defined by the Office for National Statistics extends beyond the parish boundary into the neighbouring parish of Hawkwell. The built up area had a population of 12,615 at the 2021 census, compared to 9,889 for the parish of Rochford. Immediately adjoining the Rochford built up area to the north is the Ashingdon built up area, which had a population of 6,485 in 2021.

== Governance ==
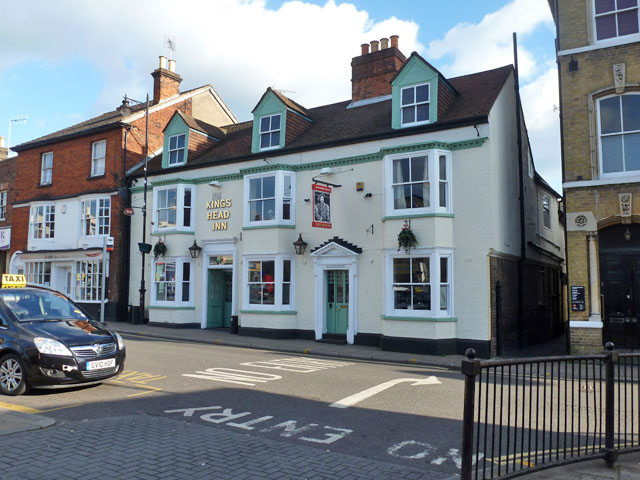
Former Kings Head Inn, West Street

There are three tiers of local government covering Rochford, at parish, district, and county level: Rochford Parish Council, Rochford District Council, and Essex County Council. The parish council is based at the former King's Head Inn on West Street.

For national elections, Rochford forms part of the Southend East and Rochford constituency. The Member of Parliament is Bayo Alaba of the Labour Party.

Rochford was an ancient parish and gave its name to the Rochford Hundred of Essex. When elected parish and district councils were created in 1894, Rochford was given a parish council and included in the Rochford Rural District. The rural district was replaced in 1974 with the larger Rochford District.

== Landmarks ==
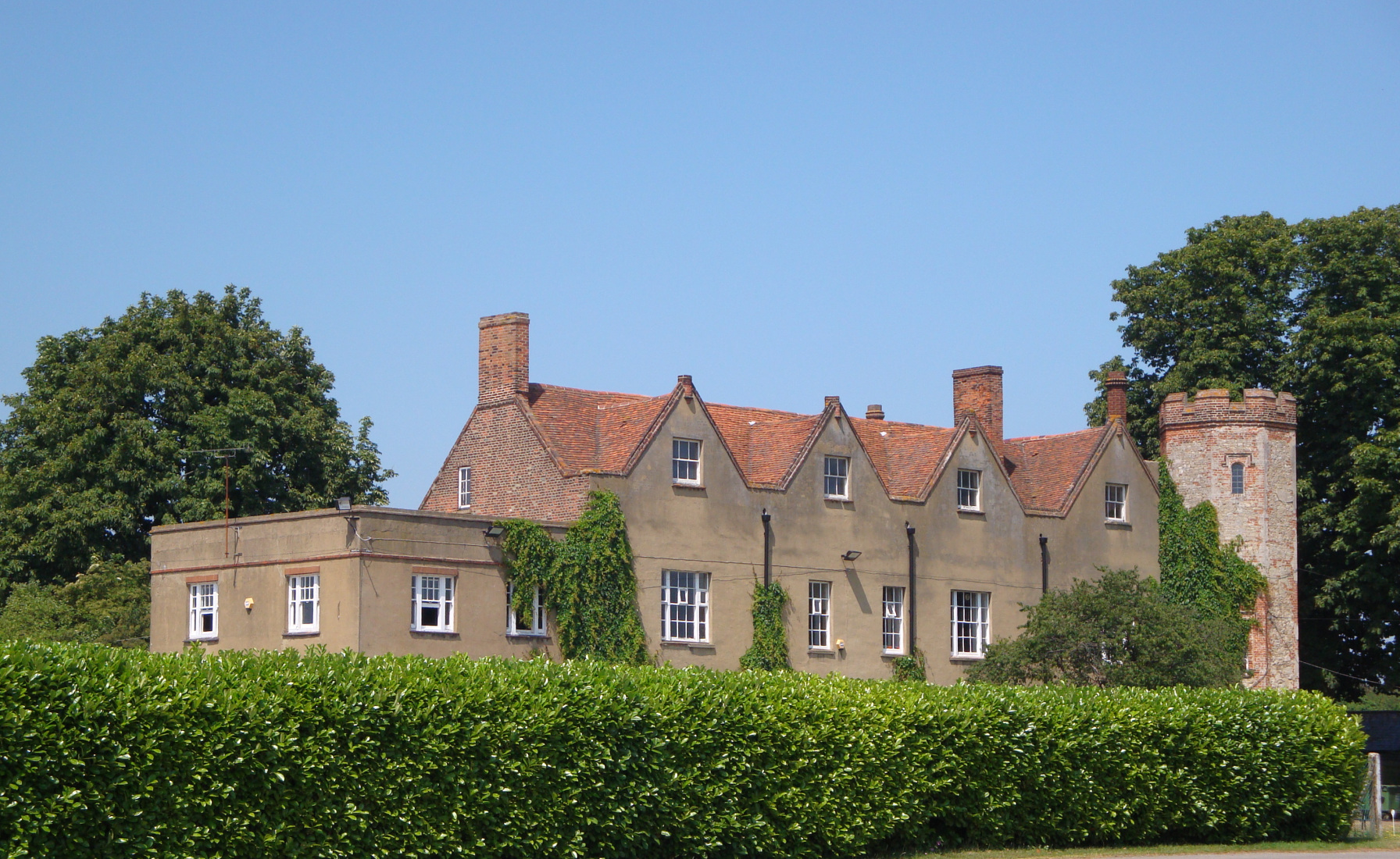
Rochford Hall, Rochford

Rochford Hall is privately owned by Rochford Hundred Golf Club. The Corn Exchange, now home to the local branch of the Women's Institute, was completed in 1866.

== Leisure ==
Clements Hall Leisure Centre is managed by Fusion Lifestyle, for Rochford District Council.

The Roach Valley Way is a 23-mile (37 km) circular path centred on Rochford and the River Crouch and River Roach estuaries.

== Sport ==
Rochford Hundred Rugby Club was formed in 1962 and, as of 2019, play in London & South East Premier—level 5 of the English rugby union system.

Rochford Town Football Club are a non-league side who play in the second division of the Essex Olympian Football League.

Rankin's Cricket Club was established in 1881 and play in the T Rippon Mid Essex League.

== Transport ==
Trains run from Rochford railway station eastbound to Southend Victoria and westbound to Liverpool Street station in the business district of central London. Southend Airport railway station, which is sited on the eastern boundary of the airport, opened on 18 July 2011.

Rochford has bus links to the surrounding towns; routes 7, 8 and 9 travel to Rayleigh and Southend-on-Sea.

There are over twenty scheduled flight destinations within Europe available from London Southend Airport.

== Media ==
Local TV coverage is provided by BBC East and ITV Anglia. Television signals are received from the Sudbury TV transmitter and the local relay TV transmitter. BBC London and ITV London can also be received from the Crystal Palace TV transmitter.

Local radio stations are BBC Essex on 95.3 FM, Heart East on 97.5 FM and Radio Essex on 105.1 FM.

The town is served by the local newspaper, Southend Echo.

== Rochford Hospital ==
Rochford Hospital used to be primarily the district maternity hospital. It was here, in 1956, that Sister J Ward made observations that led to the development of phototherapy for newborns suffering from jaundice. Much of the site was redeveloped and turned over to housing use once the decision was made to transfer the majority of services to Southend Hospital in 1990, with only the Acute Adult Inpatient Service remaining on part of the former site.

== Churches ==
=== St Andrew's Parish Church ===
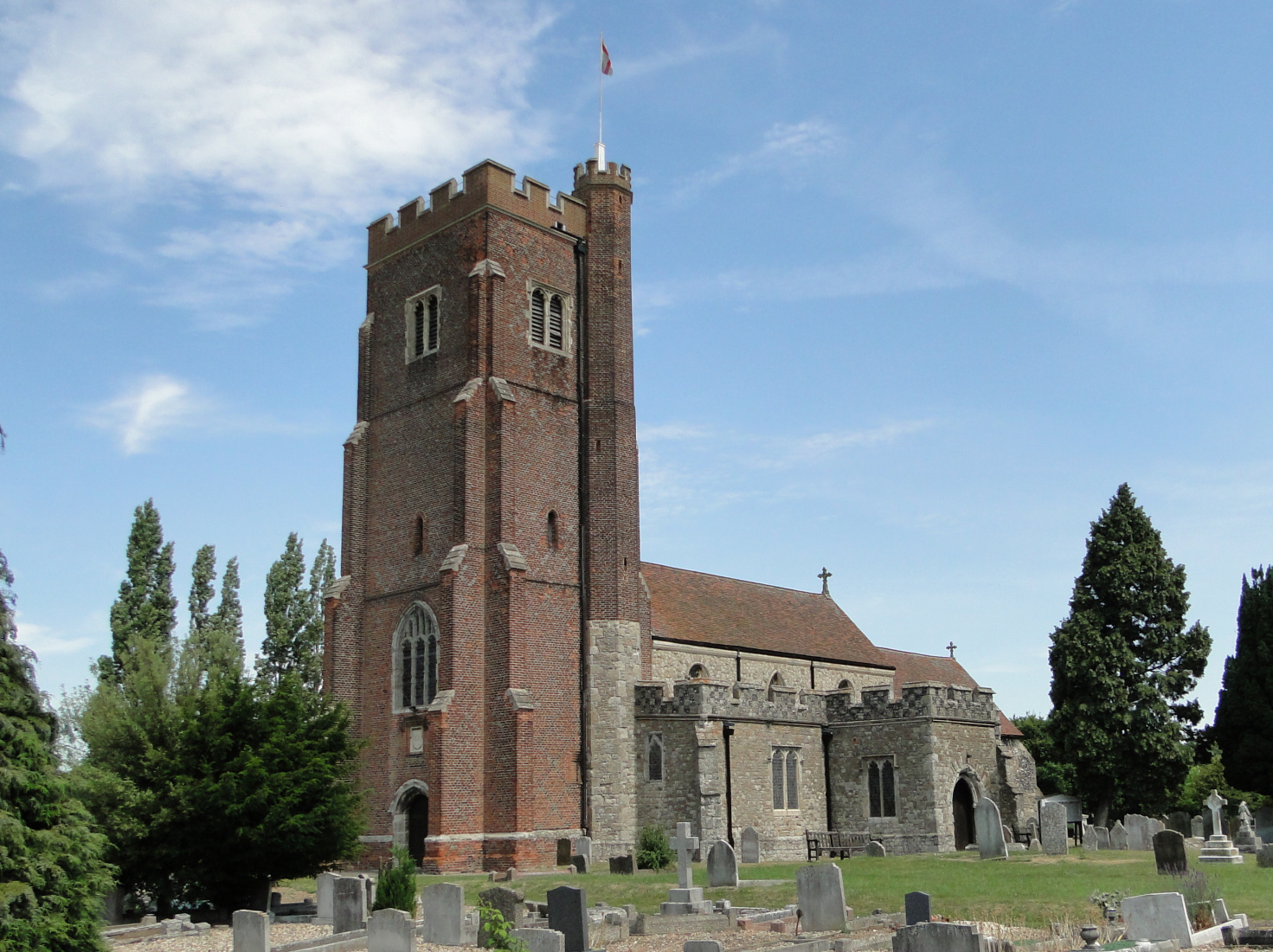
St Andrew's Church, Rochford

The ancient Church of England parish church is St Andrew's Church, Rochford, close to Rochford Hall, and is part of Rochford Deanery, within the Bradwell Area of the Diocese of Chelmsford. It is thought to have originated in Anglo-Saxon times, but the current church building dates from the 14th, 15th and 16th centuries. It is a Grade II* listed building.

=== Free churches ===
Rochford Congregational Church has been part of the local community since 1750. The Congregational Church also established the first Dissenting School in the area; When others were afraid of educating the children of the lower classes because they might prove a danger to the state, the church ensured that ordinary people had "a plain and useful education."

Rochford Methodist Church, near the White Horse Public House. The Methodists have been in Rochford since 1822, originally meeting in a building where Market Alley turns into the Square. In 1841 they moved to a new building in North Street near Weir Pond Road, and in 1880 they moved to their current premises.

Rochford Community Church was founded in 1987 and meets at The Freight House near the railway station.

=== Catholic church ===
There is a Roman Catholic church on Ashingdon Road, Rochford, dedicated to St Teresa of the child Jesus. It was founded in 1953; the present church building opened in 1977.

== Notable people ==
- Arthur Aitken, military commander
- Jamie Cullum, jazz-pop musician
- Terry Alderton, comedian and former footballer
- Peter Allen, journalist and radio presenter
- Barrie Delf, professional footballer
- Digby Fairweather, jazz musician
- Brenda Forbes, Anglo-American actress of stage and screen
- Philip Guard, actor
- Dean Macey, athlete
- Mike Penning, Conservative MP
- Richard Rich, 1st Baron Rich, Lord Chancellor under King Edward VI, died in Rochford 12 June 1567
- Rachel Riley, TV presenter and mathematician, born in Rochford but raised in Thorpe Bay, Southend-on-Sea
- Will Stevens, racing driver
- Amanda Tapping, actress, producer and director was born in Rochford before moving to Canada with her family.
- Andrew Tyrie, Conservative MP
- Tony Way, actor, writer and comedian was born in Rochford and grew up in Wickford
- Omar Abdullah, Chief Minister, Jammu and Kashmir, India
- James Bourne, Singer and guitarist for band McBusted
- Paul Stephenson (civil rights campaigner), leader of the Bristol Bus Boycott
- Matthew Yates, athlete
- Susannah Carr, Australian television news presenter, born in Rochford but emigrated to Australia when she was 7 months old.
