= Loxwood =

Village and parish in West Sussex, England

Coordinates: 51.07336°N 0.51933°W

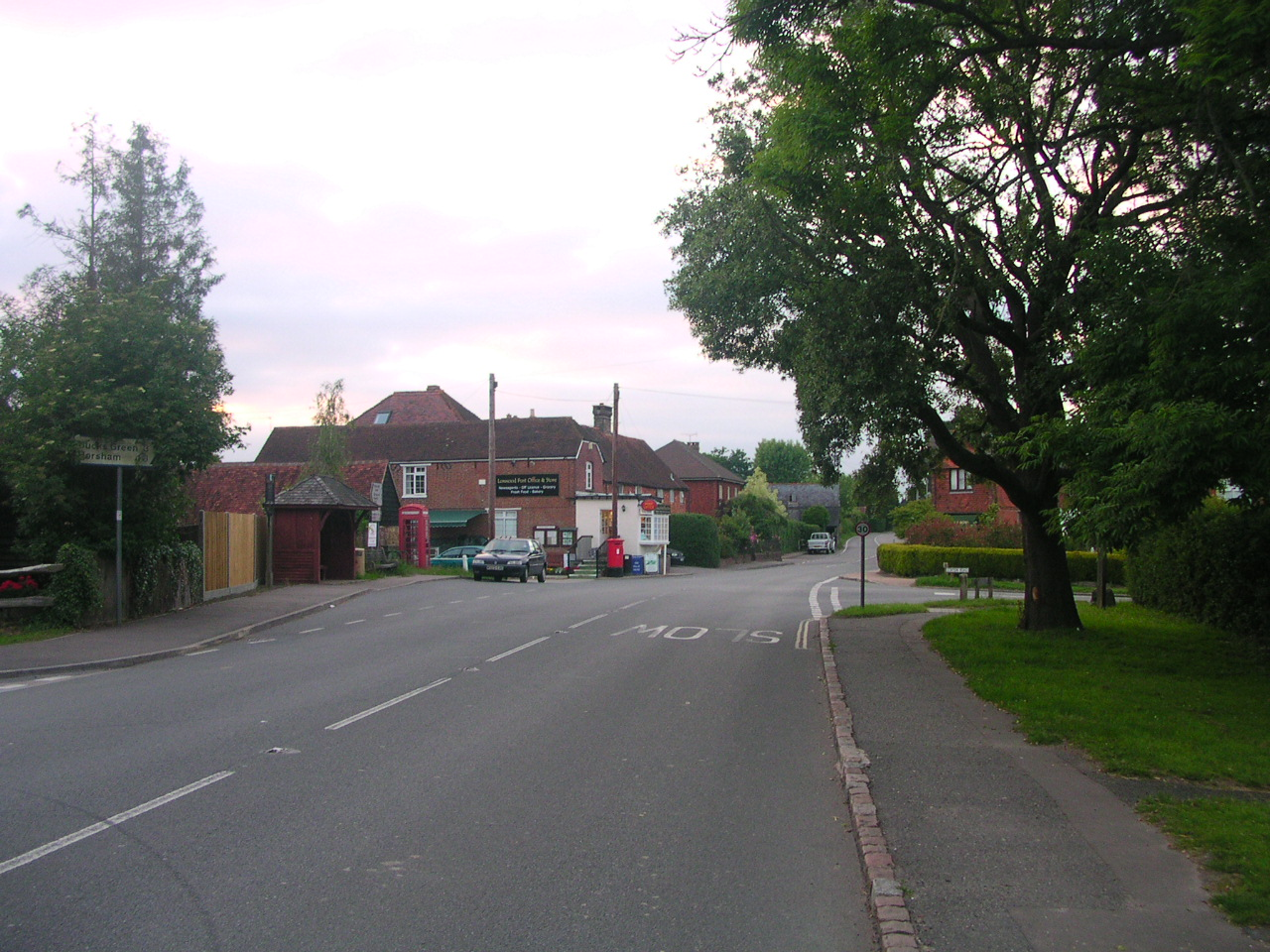
- Loxwood Street

- Location within West Sussex
- Area: 18.24 km^{2} (7.04 sq mi)
- Population: 1,480 (2011 Census)
  - Density: 74/km^{2} (190/sq mi)
- OS grid reference: TQ038314
  - London: 34 miles (55 km) NNE
- Civil parish: Loxwood
- District: Chichester
- Shire county: West Sussex
- Region: South East
- Country: England
- Sovereign state: United Kingdom
- Post town: BILLINGSHURST
- Postcode district: RH14
- Dialling code: 01403
- Police: Sussex
- Fire: West Sussex
- Ambulance: South East Coast
- UK Parliament: Arundel and South Downs
- Website: http://www.loxwood.org/

Loxwood is a small village and civil parish with several outlying settlements, in the Chichester district of West Sussex, England, within the Low Weald. The Wey and Arun Canal passes to the East and South of the village. This Civil Parish is at the centre of an excellent network of bridleways and footpaths crossing the Low Weald and joining with those in adjacent Counties.

== Overview ==
The 2001 census recorded a population of 1341 people living in 660 households. 536 people were economically active. Between that census and 2011 approximately 55 more dwellings have been built, probably adding net more than 100 people. At March 1, 2011 the electoral register showed 1200 electors. The 2011 Census gave a population of 1,480.

A considerable number of the economically active residents of Loxwood are self-employed. Most people who commute regularly to a principal place of work do so to the Gatwick Diamond area (loosely an area between Redhill in the north and Crawley to the south), to Horsham, to Guildford or Woking, or to London, and tele-commuting is growing in popularity.

There is a primary school, village hall, a sports centre, an Anglican church, a chapel, two pubs The Onslow Arms and the Sir Roger Tichborne at Alfold Bars, a small number of shops, a sub-post office and a medical practice.

The village was once one of the settlements greatly influenced by a small Christian sect, the Society of Dependants, also known as Cokelers who left London in the mid-1800s. They built their first chapel in the village. The sect evolved to run a Combination Store in the village, the building for which houses villages shops today.

Lawrence Durrell, author of The Alexandria Quartet, lived here from 1933 to 1934, in a cottage called Chestnut Mead. Durrell, along with his first wife Nancy and another young couple, George and Pam Wilkinson, left Fitzrovia to live in the English countryside. It was here that Durrell, then in his early twenties, wrote what became his first published novel, Pied Piper of Lovers.

In 2019 the village attempted to declare independence from the UK due to believed political turmoil.

As a result the village formed its own government, formed and then recruited its own military, has established its own currency, the Loxwood groat, and elected its own monarch, Queen of Loxwood Katheryn Adelina, who has stated that the village itself would be enforcing 15th-century law.

== Schools ==
Loxwood Primary School was reported to have 155 children on the school roll in 2001. Typically 30% to 50% of these children are not from Loxwood itself, but from surrounding villages; this has been attributed to the closing of smaller adjacent, village schools. A "pre-school" is adjacent to the school, supported financially and in other ways by a Parents group who have run a Beer Festival for several years.

== Sport and leisure ==
Loxwood has a Non-League football club Loxwood F.C. who play at the recreation ground on Plaistow Road, and have been playing since 1920.

== Hamlets ==
Purlieus of the village include Alfold Bars, Gunshot Common, Flitchfold, Roundstreet Common, Drungewick Lane and Manor, and Wephurst Park.
