= Society of Dependants =

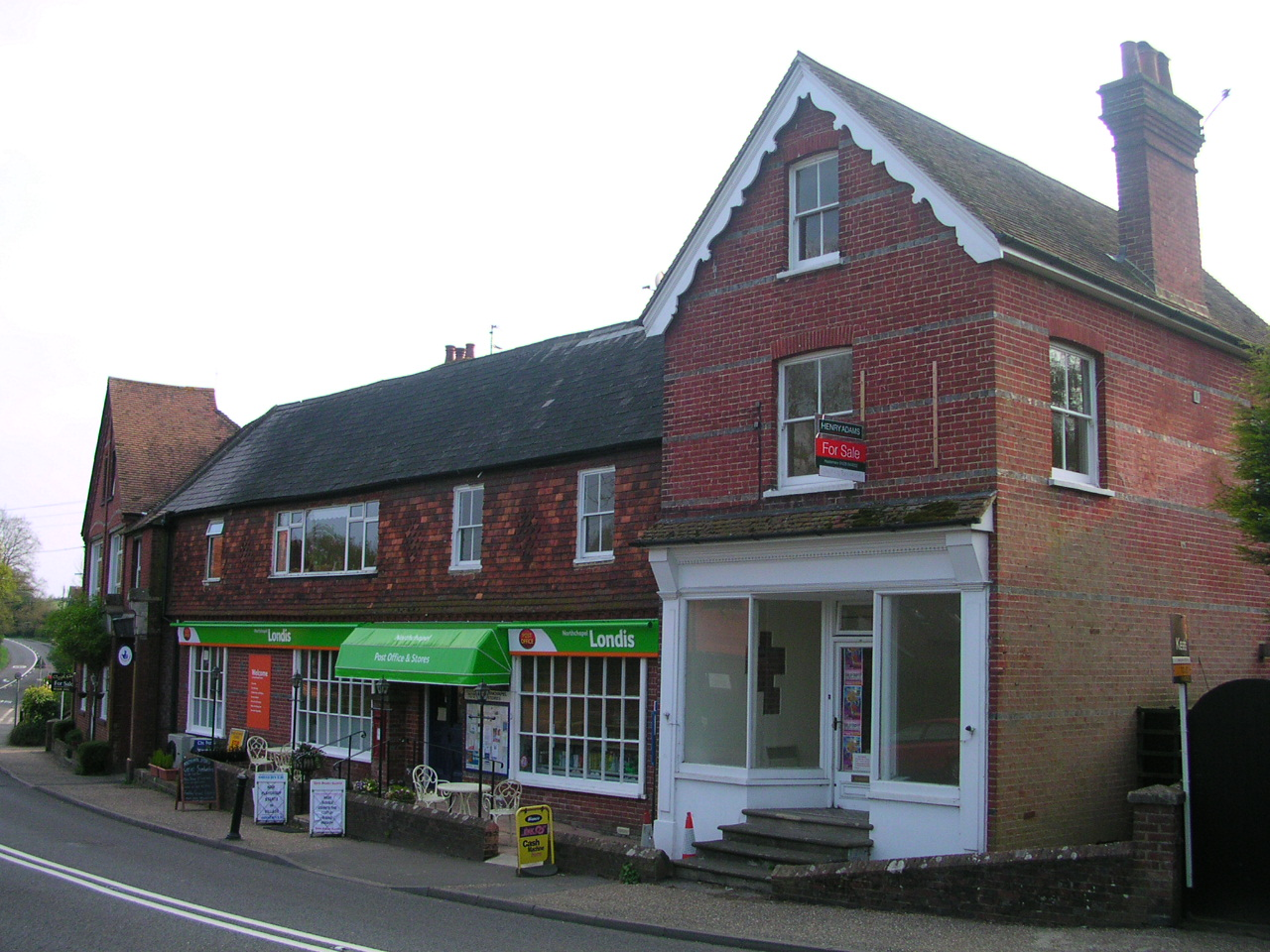
Northchapel Stores

The Society of Dependants were a Christian sect of Protestant dissenters founded by John Sirgood in the mid-nineteenth century. Their stronghold was in West Sussex and Surrey where they formed co-operatives in some villages. They were widely known as "Cokelers", a nickname of uncertain derivation but which was used from an early date.

== History ==
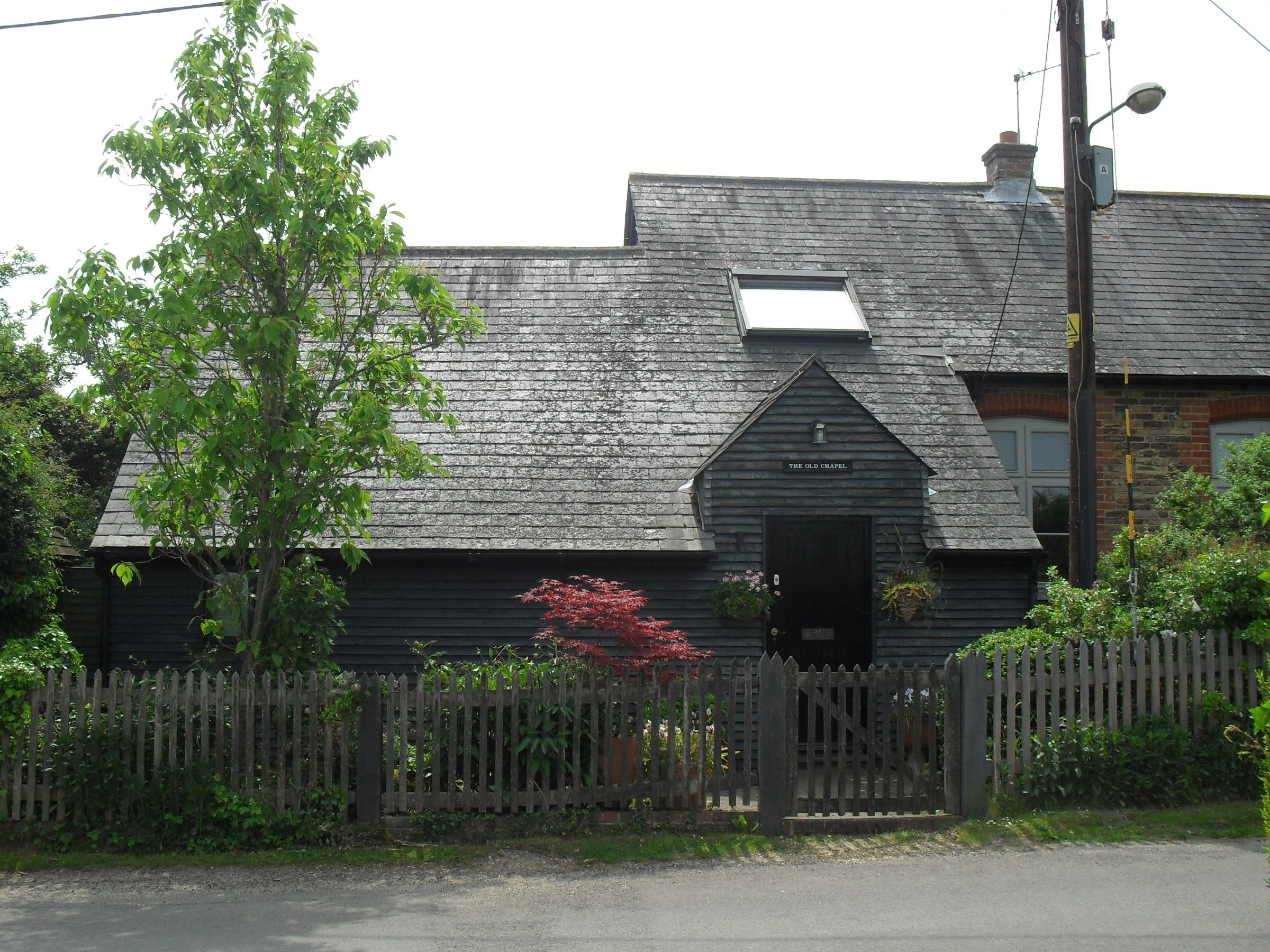
The former chapel at Warnham, West Sussex.

Members of the Society of Dependants were Protestant dissenters whose beliefs largely derived from Wesleyan Arminianism. They believed in the people's ability to exercise free will and thereby achieve salvation rather than the Calvinistic assertion of predestination. They were conscientious objectors in wartime and were encouraged but not required to remain unmarried. Beginning in the 1850s meetings were held on commons or in barns and faced opposition from the landed gentry and the clergy. Both men and women preached, which was unusual at that time, seeking converts amongst the poor and humble.

They first established themselves under Sirgood's leadership at Loxwood because it was outside of the control of the large estates whose Anglican owners would have denied them land or premises. The Protestant Dissenters Act 1852 required dissenter sects to register a place of worship effectively making illegal the use of open spaces for worship. The sect was threatened with legal action for unlawful meetings by the parish authorities in Loxwood and many letters were written by both sides but no action was taken. The repeal of the Conventicle Act soon after left the sect free to worship openly and in 1861 the first Dependant chapel was opened at Loxwood . Seven more chapels were built in Upper Norwood, Shamley Green, Warnham, Lords Hill, Northchapel, Chichester and Hove. These were simple undecorated buildings, with a room where those who had walked long distances to attend could rest during the day-long Sunday worship.

A number of combination stores were opened around 1879 at: Norwood, Lord's Hill, Northchapel, Warnham and Loxwood, where members lived communally, investing and working in the business. Some followers disagreed with entering the world of commerce but the shops were successful, selling everything from soap to suspenders, bacon to bootlaces. They also grew their own produce to sell, living communally on tenanted farms. When there was a fashion for cycling in the 1890s they opened bicycle shops at Northchapel, Loxwood and Warnham. The Loxwood site included a steam bakery. At Northchapel in the early 20th century the stores consisted of three departments, employing thirteen saleswomen and assistants, together with delivery drivers. At the same date the Warnham stores employed thirty one people of both sexes. Most of the staff lived over the shops. All profits were put back in the business or used to help the needy. They also made furniture to sell, sturdy utilitarian pieces, some of which still survive.

The following verse comes from the Dependants' Hymn Book

Christ's Combination Stores for me
Where I can be so well supplied,
Where I can one with brethren be,
Where competition is defied..

The group declined in numbers through the twentieth century, and, by the late 1980s, there were only handful of adherents remaining, worshipping in Loxwood and Northchapel.

== Beliefs and customs ==
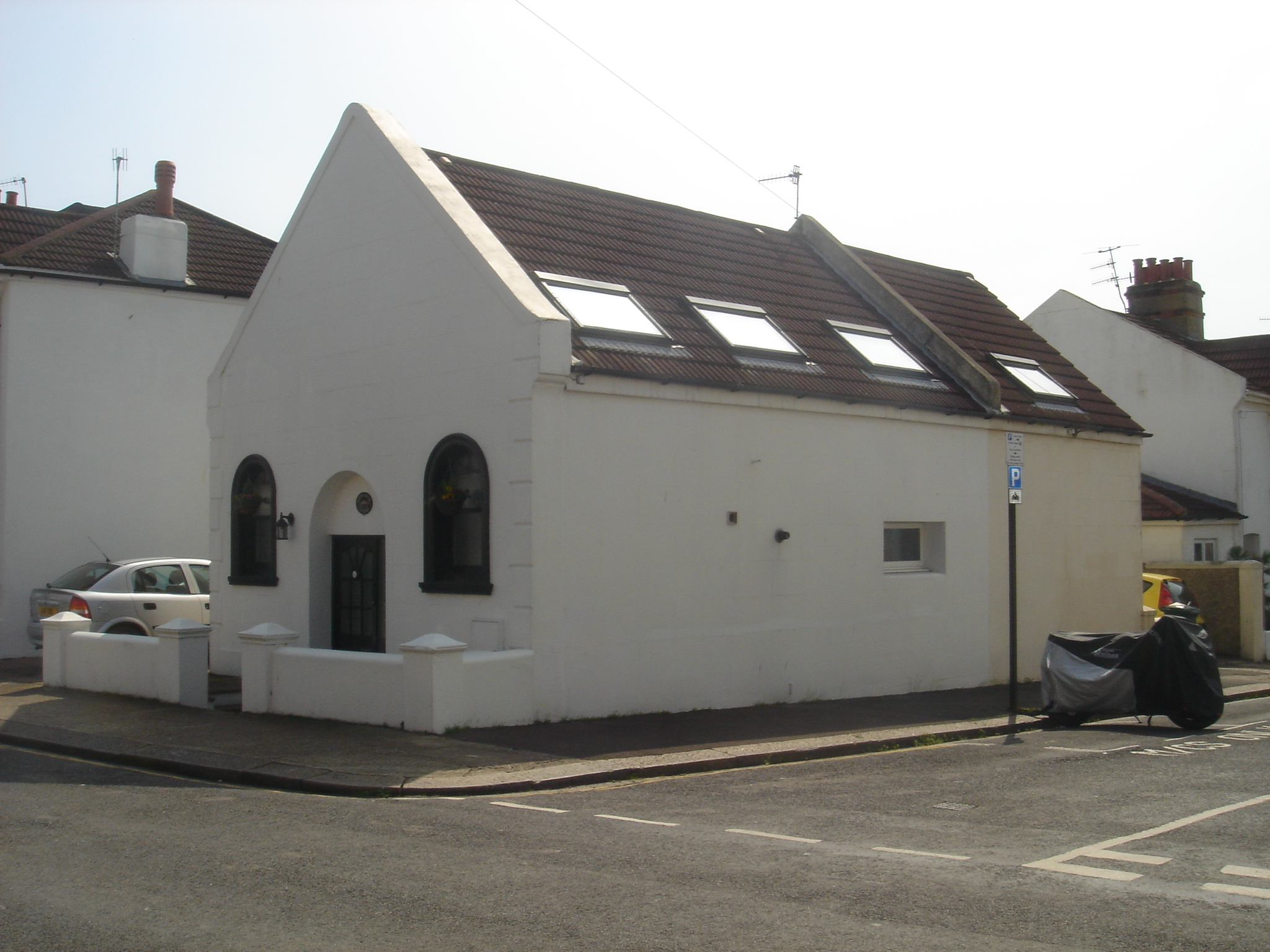
The former chapel at Hove.

With a system of beliefs similar to the Peculiar People in Essex the Dependants believed that when without sin they would each be possessed of a small part of the divine body of Christ and that a place would be reserved for them at the high table at the marriage feast in Heaven. Members of the sect would not listen to secular music, read books other than the Bible, play games or have flowers in the home. They would not smoke tobacco or drink alcohol. They were pacifists and were conscientious objectors during the world wars, when they were mostly allowed to continue working on the farms. The Lord's Prayer was not used in their worship, as it was regarded by Sirgood as an earthly institution which was incompatible with the higher life the Brethren wished to lead. The sect had no marriage ceremony and discouraged marriage as coming between a person and their God, although it was not forbidden and many dependants were married. Unusually for a Christian sect the elders of the chapels would permit a young couple to live together in a trial marriage for up to two years, after which time they could separate or marry in a church or secular ceremony.

The whole sect would be at chapel on Sundays and usually another two evenings per week as well as any public holidays, travelling great distances from outlying farms in many cases. The women would wear small black bonnets of woven straw and velvet, black shawls, black coats and black full-length skirts, with their hair pulled back into a plaited bun. The men would also be dressed in dark clothing and hats and have muttonchop whiskers and a small beard under the chin. Each chapel would have a "Leader" and a few other elders known as "Stalwarts". They had no music and no printed prayer book, prayers rather being copied out by hand. The Leader would begin by reading out a series of rhyming couplets which the congregation would chant after him, then would read a chapter of the Bible with added commentary on its moral teachings. Following this members of the congregation might spontaneously sing Cokeler hymns and testify in broad Sussex dialect, but without the silences of a Quaker meeting. There would be a back room at the chapel for members who had come a long distance to eat and rest between morning and evening services. On Bank holidays the congregations might travel to special services at Loxwood.

== Names of the sect ==
Whilst calling themselves Dependants the sect were known to outsiders as Cokelers. Writers have speculated as to the origin of the term cokeler. It may have originated from John Sirgood's habit of drinking cocoa, a drink little known in the countryside at that time. Henry W Stiles, writing in 1931, claimed to have been told by Peter Pacy, a disciple of Sirgood, that if offered beer when preaching at village inns Sirgood would reply "no but I will have some cocoa". Another possible explanation is that part of Loxwood was known as Cokkes Field, although there are no written references to this name on maps in use during Sirgood's time there. R J Sharpe, writing from Chichester in 1931, said that the sect were also locally known as "Ranters". It has also been proposed that Cokeler is derived from the Sussex dialect word 'Coke' meaning to pry or peep Another explanation is that Cokelers is a corruption of "cuckolders", based on mistrust of the unusual aversion to marriage in the sect and its tolerance of young couples living together for a period before either marrying or separating. The sect disliked the name and would not use it.
