= Peculiar People =

Christian movement founded in England

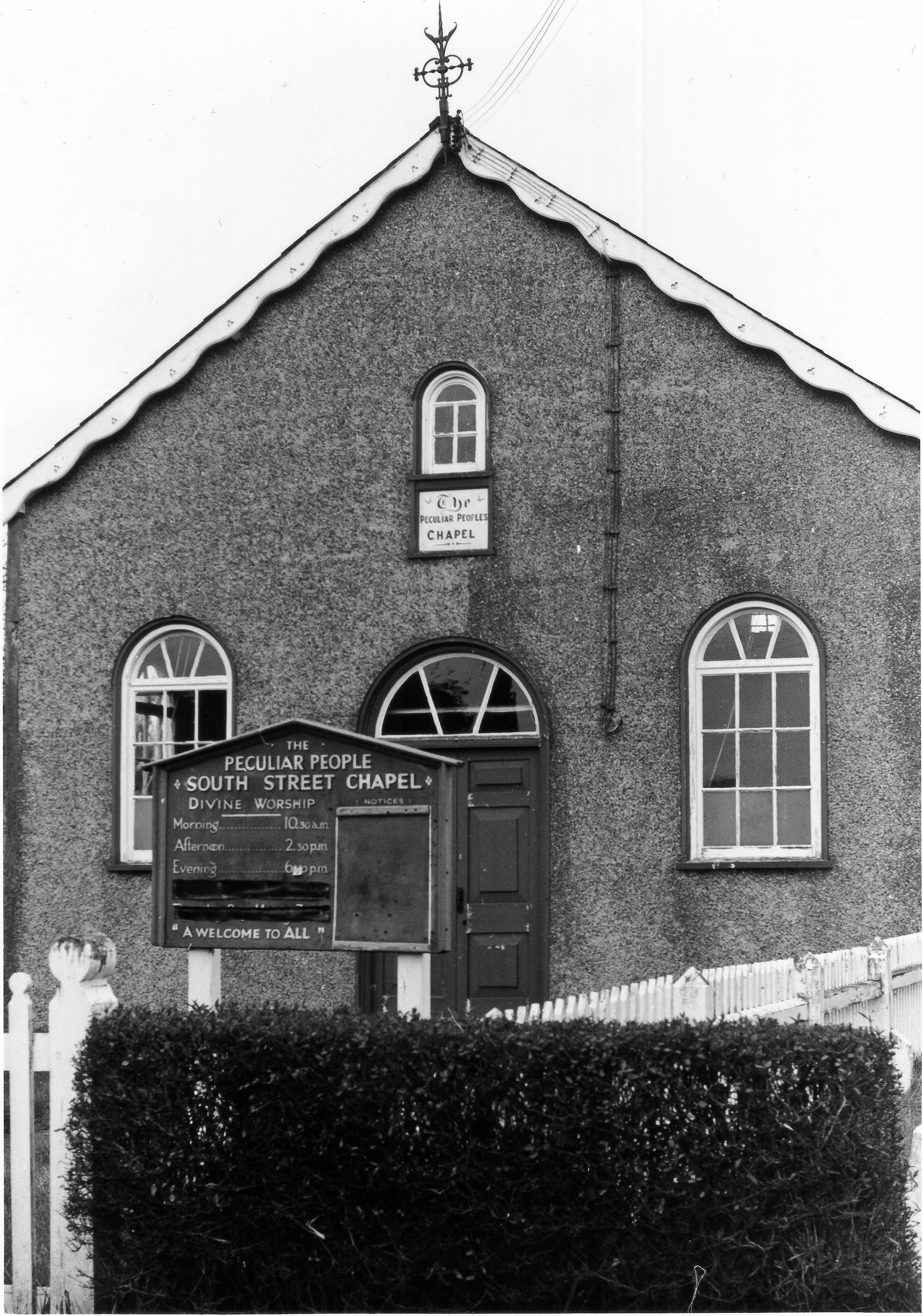
The Peculiar People’s Chapel in Tillingham, circa 1975

The Peculiar People, now officially known as the Union of Evangelical Churches, is a Christian movement that was originally an offshoot of the Wesleyan denomination, founded in 1838 in Rochford, Essex, by James Banyard, a farm-worker's son born in 1800. They derive their name from a term of praise found in both the Old Testament and the New Testament of the King James Bible, in Deuteronomy, in 1 Peter, and in the Epistle of Titus.

In the King James Version of the Bible, first published in 1611, Deuteronomy 14:2 includes the verse "For thou art an holy people unto the Lord thy God, and the Lord hath chosen thee to be a peculiar people unto himself, above all the nations that are upon the earth"; 1 Peter 2:9 reads "But ye are a chosen generation, a royal priesthood, an holy nation, a peculiar people; that ye should shew forth the praises of him who hath called you out of darkness into his marvellous light"; and Titus 2:14 reads "Who gave himself for us, that he might redeem us from all iniquity, and purify unto himself a peculiar people, zealous of good works."

The Peculiar People is also a phrase used to describe the Quakers, which they adopted with some pride. The same has also been true of the Amish.

== Foundation and spread ==
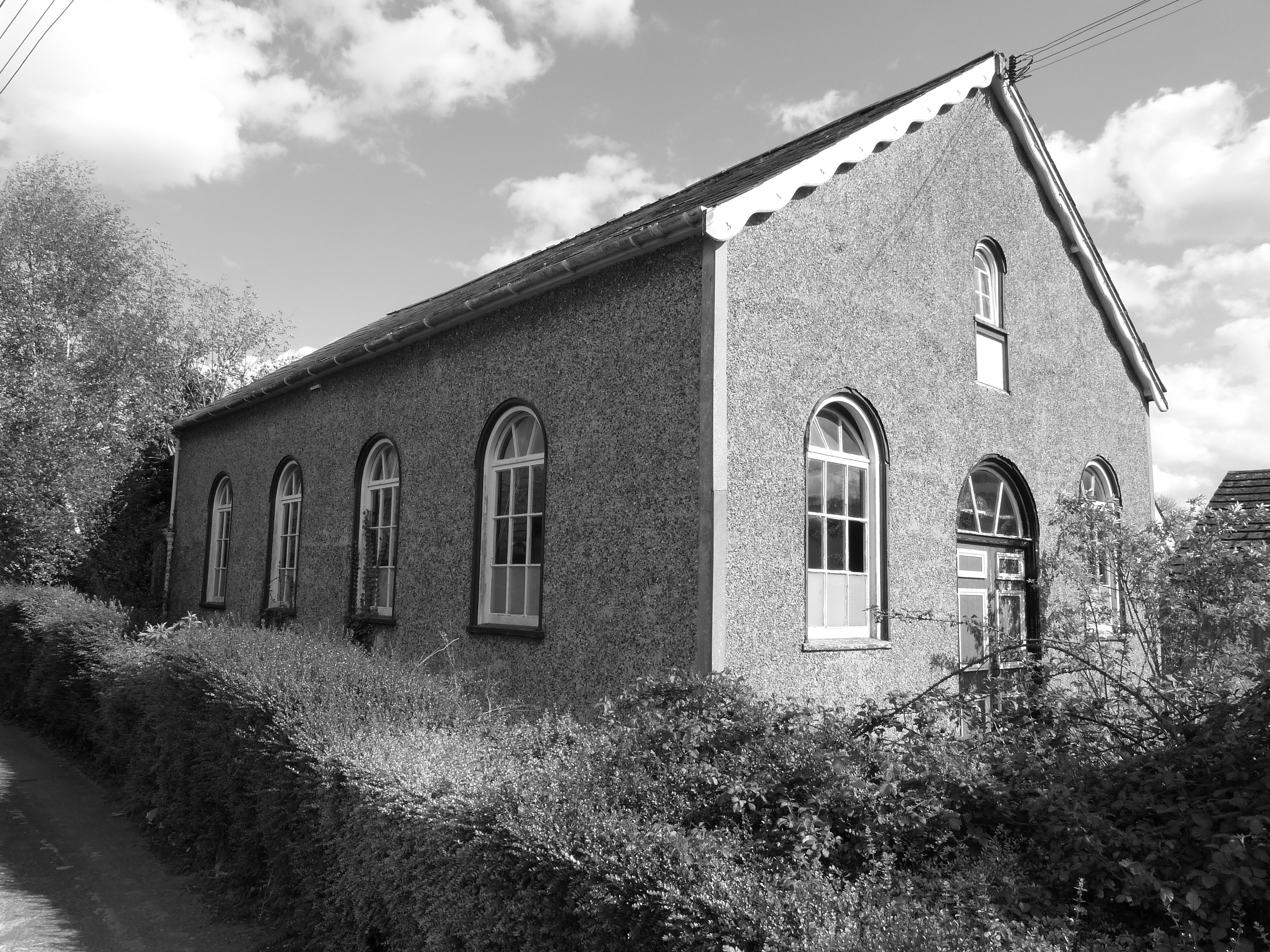
The former Peculiar People's Chapel at Tillingham in Essex

Banyard was frequently drunk until his wife asked him to attend a service in the local Wesleyan Methodist chapel. The preacher's message had a profound effect on Banyard, to the extent that he became teetotal and regularly attended the church. Before long he became a reputable preacher on the Wesleyan circuit. In 1837 he and William Bridges took a lease on an old workhouse at Rochford which became the first chapel of their new group, which Banyard and Bridges called the Peculiar People, a name taken from Deuteronomy 14:2 and 1 Peter 2:9.

The grave of James Banyard can still be seen in the churchyard of St Andrew's Rochford.

In the mid-1850s the Peculiar People spread deeper into Essex, much of which was agricultural land occupied by a naturally conservative population. The Peculiar People preached a puritanical form of Christianity which proved popular, and numerous chapels sprang up throughout rural Essex. They also practised faith healing.

There is an account of the Peculiars in 19th-century Plumstead in Unorthodox London by Charles Maurice Davies. In Blunt's Dictionary of Sects and Heresies (1874), the Peculiars were described as 'a sect of very ignorant people'.

The Peculiar People practised a lively form of worship and considered themselves bound by the literal interpretation of the King James Bible. They did not seek medical care in cases of sickness, instead relying on prayer as an act of faith. This led to judicial criticism when children died due to lack of treatment. In 1855 Banyard's fifth child Josiah was born in Rochford. When the boy became seriously ill, Banyard "agonised" at length but eventually a doctor was called in. From this time on, Banyard began to advise the use of prayer and medical attention. This matter led to the first doctrinal schism within the church of the Peculiar People when Banyard was deposed as Bishop. Because he owned the Rochford chapel he continued to preach there to "a loyal minority". Banyard was replaced by Bishop Samuel Harrod (who was deposed himself in 1890 following a sex scandal).

In response to the concern about refusing medical care, which led to some parents being imprisoned after a 1910 diphtheria outbreak in Essex, the sect split between the 'Old Peculiars', who still rebuffed medicine, and the 'New Peculiars', who somewhat reluctantly condoned it. The split healed in the 1930s, when in general the New Peculiar position prevailed. During the two world wars, some Peculiar People were conscientious objectors, believing as they still do that war is contrary to the teachings of Jesus Christ.

From 1901, the elected Bishop of the church was William Heddle, a Scotsman who had moved to Southend-on-Sea c. 1870 and had opened a credit drapery business in Park Street. Heddle had joined the church in 1873 and served as the Supreme Bishop of the Peculiar People until he stepped down in 1942, dying in 1948 at the age of 101.

== Union of Evangelical Churches ==
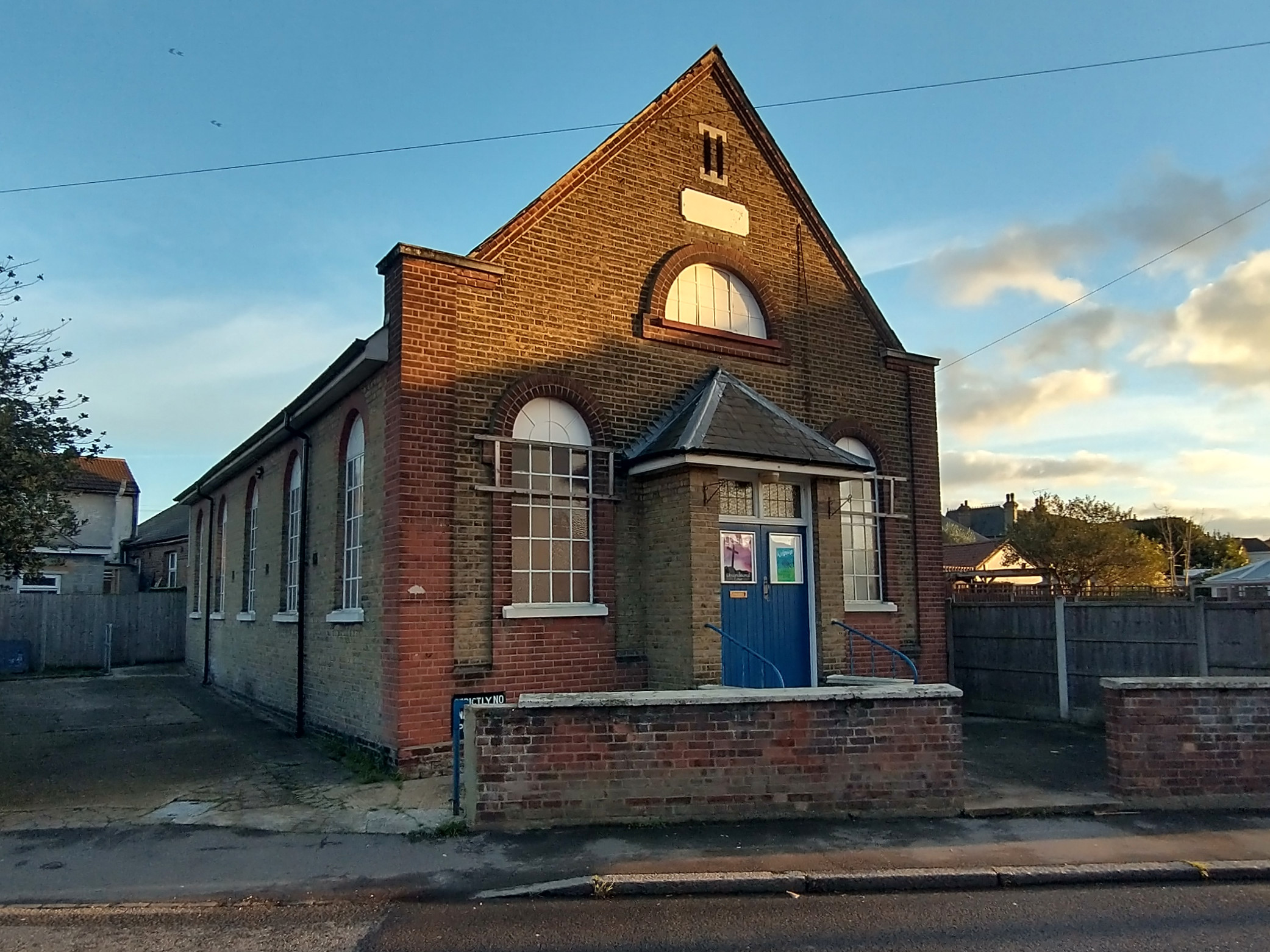
Fresh Hope Community Church, The Union of Evangelical Churches, Stanford-le-Hope, in 2024

Church membership had peaked in the 1850s, and at its greatest extent the movement had 43 chapels; but it declined until 1956, when the Peculiar People changed their name to the less conspicuous Union of Evangelical Churches. In 1979, 27 chapels were reported as being active. The movement continues, and regular worship takes place at 15 remaining chapels (as of August 2024) in Essex and London. Some of the traditional distinctive features mentioned have been abandoned, so that UEC churches today are similar to other Evangelical churches.

The UEC maintains its structure as a connection of churches, but is associated with the Fellowship of Independent Evangelical Churches and Affinity. Its central office was originally at Eastwood Road Evangelical Church in Rayleigh, which opened in 1923. After that closed in 2019, the registered office became Stanway Evangelical Church in Colchester.

The 15 UEC churches are in Camberwell and Canning Town in London, and Chelmsford, Corringham, Cressing, Daws Heath, Eastwood, Great Wakering, Little Totham, Shoeburyness, Southend, Stanford-le-Hope, Stanway, Wickford and Witham in Essex.

Although services had previously been discontinued at Shoeburyness and Stanford-le-Hope and the churches temporarily closed, all three are now home to regular worshipping congregations once again. Services had similarly been discontinued at Rayleigh but resumed, only for the chapel to close permanently in 2019. It was acquired by a congregation of the Celestial Church of Christ, a Pentecostal group.

== Bibliography ==
- Davis, Matt (August 2024). Davis, Matt (ed.). "Faith Group Focus: The Celestial Church of Christ". Chapels Society Newsletter. No. 89. The Chapels Society. pp. 14–18. ISSN 1357-3276.
- Sorrell, Mark (1979). The Peculiar People. Exeter: The Paternoster Press. ISBN 0-85364-263-X.
