= List of places in West Sussex =

Some of the larger settlements of West Sussex.

This is a list of cities, towns, villages and other geographical places in the ceremonial county of West Sussex, England. Towns and cities are shown in bold type.

== A ==
- Abbotsford, Adversane, Albourne, Aldingbourne, Aldsworth, Aldwick, Almodington, Amberley, Ancton, Angmering, Annington, Ansty, Apuldram, Ardingly, **Arundel**, Ashfold, Ashington, Ashurst, Ashurst Wood, Atherington

== B ==
- Balcombe, Balls Cross, Barlavington, Barnham, Barns Green, Bedham, Bepton, Bignor, Billingshurst, Bilsham, Binderton, Bines Green, Birdham, Bolney, **Bognor Regis**, Borden, Bosham, Bosham Hoe, Botolphs, Boxgrove, Bracklesham Bay, Bramber, Broadbridge Heath, Brooks Green, Broomer's Corner, **Burgess Hill**, Burpham, Bury, Byworth

== C ==
- Charlton, **Chichester**, Chidham, Chilgrove, Chithurst, Church Norton, Clapham, Climping, Climping sand dunes, Cocking, Cocking Causeway, Codmore Hill, Coldwaltham, Colgate, Colwood, Colworth, Compton, Coneyhurst, Coolham, Coombes, Cootham, Copsale, Copthorne, Coultershaw Bridge, Cowfold, Crabtree, **Crawley**, Crawley Down, Crockerhill, Cuckfield

== D ==
- Dell Quay, Dial Green, Dial Post, Didling, Donnington, Dragon's Green, Duncton, Durford, Durford Wood, Durleighmarsh, Durrington

== E ==
- Earnley, Eartham, Easebourne, East Ashling, East Dean, **East Grinstead**, East Hampnett, East Harting, East Itchenor, East Lavant, East Lavington, East Marden, East Preston, East Wittering, East Wittering and Bracklesham, Eastergate, Ebernoe, Egdean, Elmer, Elsted, Elsted and Treyford

== F ==
- Faygate, Felpham, Fernhurst, Ferring, Findon, Findon Valley, Fishbourne, Fishersgate, Fittleworth, Five Oaks, Flansham, Fontwell, Ford, Fulking, Funtington, Furnace Green, Fyning

== G ==
- Garbett's Wood, Gatwick Stream, Gay Street, Goddards Green, Goodwood, Goodwood Country Park, Goose Green, Goring by Sea, Graffham, Graylands Copse, Greater Brighton City Region

== H ==
- Habin, Halnaker, Hammer, Hampers Green, Handcross, Hardham, Harting, Hassocks, **Haywards Heath**, Heath Common, Heath End (West Sussex), Henfield, Henley (near Fernhurst), Heyshott, Hickstead, High Salvington, Highdown Gardens, Highbrook, Hill Brow, **Horsham**, Horsted Keynes, Houghton, Hoyle, Hunston, Hurstpierpoint, Hurst, Hurst Wickham, Hurstpierpoint and Sayers Common

== I ==
- Ifield, Ifold, Iping, Itchenor, Itchingfield

== K ==
- Keymer, Kingsfold, Kingsley Green, Kingston by Ferring, Kingston by Sea, Kirdford

== L ==
- Lancing, Lambs Green, Langley, Lavant, Lidsey, Lickfold, Linch, Linchmere, Lindfield, Lindfield Rural, **Littlehampton**, Littleworth, Lodsworth, Lower Beeding, Loxwood, Lurgashall, Lyminster

== M ==
- Madehurst, Maidenbower, Mannings Heath, Manor Royal, Maplehurst, Marden, Marehill, Maudlin, Merston, Mid Lavant, Middleton-on-Sea, **Midhurst**, Milland, Monk's Gate, Minsted

== N ==
- Newtimber, North Bersted, Newpound Common, North Ambersham, North Heath, North Horsham, North Marden, North Mundham, North Stoke, Northchapel, Norton, Nutbourne (Chichester), Nutbourne (Horsham), Nuthurst, Nyewood, Nyetimber, Nyton

== O ==
- Oaklands Park, Chichester, Offham, Oving

== P ==
- Pagham, Parham, Partridge Green, Patching, Pease Pottage, Peter Pan's Playground, **Petworth**, Plaistow, Plummer's Plain, Poling, Pound Hill & Worth, Poynings, Prinsted, **Pulborough**, Pyecombe

== Q ==
- Quebec (West Harting)

== R ==
- Racton, Rake, Redford, River, Rogate, Rose Green, Rowhook, Rudgwick, Runcton, Rusper, Rustington, Rustington (electoral division)

== S ==
- Saint Hill Green, Sayers Common, Scaynes Hill, Selham, **Selsey**, Selsfield Common, Sharpthorne, Shermanbury, Shillinglee, Shipley, Shipton Green, **Shoreham-by-Sea**, Shripney, Sidlesham, Singleton, Slaugham, Slindon, Slinfold, Small Dole, Somerley, Sompting, South Ambersham, South Bersted, South Coast Plain, South Harting, South Mundham, South Stoke, Southbourne, Southwater, Southwick, Southwick Hill Tunnel, Spear Hill, Staplefield, Stedham, Stedham with Iping, **Steyning**, Stopham, **Storrington**, Storrington and Sullington, Stoughton, Strettington, Strood Green, Sullington, Sussex Border Path, Sussex Downs AONB, Sussex Ouse Valley Way, Sutton

== T ==
- Tangmere, Terwick, Terwick Common, Thakeham, Thorney Island, Three Bridges, Tillington, Tisman's Common, Titty Hill, Tortington, Tote Hill, Treyford, Trotton, Turners Hill, Twineham

== U ==
- Up Marden, Upper Beeding, Upper Rapeland Wood, Upperton, Upwaltham

== W ==
- Walberton, Walderton, Walstead, Warminghurst, Warnham, Warningcamp, Warninglid, Washington, Watersfield, West Ashling, West Burton, West Chiltington, West Dean, West Grinstead, West Harting, West Hoathly, West Itchenor, West Lavington, West Marden, West Preston, West Stoke, West Thorney, West Wittering, Wepham, Westbourne, Westergate, Westerton, Westhampnett, Wey South Path, Whitemans Green, Wick, Wiggonholt, Wineham, Wisborough Green, Wiston, Woodgate, Woodmancote (Horsham), Woodmancote (Chichester), Woods Mill, Woolbeding, World's End, Worth, **Worthing**, Worthing Rural District, WWT Arundel

== Y ==
- Yapton

== See also ==
- List of settlements in West Sussex by population
- List of places in England
