= List of settlements in West Sussex by population =

The 20 largest settlements of the county of West Sussex, with its county city in bold, and district centres in yellow.

This is a list of settlements in West Sussex by population based on the results of the 2011 census. The next United Kingdom census took place in 2021. In 2011, there were 20 built-up area subdivisions with 5,000 or more inhabitants in West Sussex, shown in the table below.

== Population ranking ==
No.	Settlement	Borough/District	Population		Notes
No.	Settlement	Borough/District	(2001)	(2011)	Notes
1	Worthing	Worthing	101,929	109,120	Includes Ferring
2	Crawley	Crawley	99,660	106,943	
3	Bognor Regis	Arun	61,800	63,885	Includes Flansham, Middleton-on-Sea, Pagham. Excludes Bilsham, Colworth, Shripney
4	Littlehampton	Arun	50,930	55,706	Includes Angmering, Hammerpot, West Kingston, Wick. Excludes Lyminster, Poling
5	Shoreham-by-Sea	Adur	47,020	48,487	Includes Sompting
6	Horsham	Horsham	44,890	48,041	Includes Roffey
7	Haywards Heath	Mid Sussex	29,110	33,845	Includes Bolnore Village, Lindfield. Excludes Cuckfield, Scaynes Hill, Walstead
8	Burgess Hill	Mid Sussex	29,388	30,635	Includes World's End. Excludes Goddards Green, Wivelsfield
9	East Grinstead	Mid Sussex	26,490	29,084	Includes Ashurst Wood, Ashplats, Felbridge, Imberley. Excludes Crawley Down, Domewood, Dormans Park, Effington Park, Forest Row
10	Chichester	Chichester	25,520	28,657	Includes Stockbridge, Summerdale. Excludes Apuldram, Donnington, Fishbourne, Hunston, Lavant, Merston, North Mundham, Runction, Westhampnett
11	Hurstpierpoint	Mid Sussex	11,173	12,730	Includes Hassocks
12	Southwick	Adur	11,513	11,551	
13	Selsey	Chichester	9,720	10,550	Excludes Church Norton
14	Westergate	Arun	9,099	9,783	Includes Barnham, Eastergate, Fontwell, Walberton. Excludes Aldingbourne, Norton, Slindon, Yapton
15	Southwater	Horsham	8,298	8,692	
16	Storrington	Horsham	7,730	8,618	Includes Heath Common. Excludes Ashington, Rock, Sullington, Washington, West Wantley
17	West Chiltington Common	Horsham	6,940	7,474	Includes Pulborough
18	Billingshurst	Horsham	5,460	6,911	
19	Steyning	Horsham	6,365	6,557	Excludes Annington, Bramber
20	East Wittering	Chichester	5,127	5,647	Includes Bracklesham. Excludes Earnley
	Midhurst	Chichester	4,889	4,914	Excludes Easebourne, West Lavington
	Henfield	Horsham	4,527	4,799	Excludes West End, Woodmancote
	Crawley Down	Mid Sussex	4,631	4,598	Excludes Turners Hill

== See also ==
- West Sussex
