= Billingshurst (electoral division) =

Electoral division of West Sussex, England

Coordinates: 51.01699°N 0.41491°W

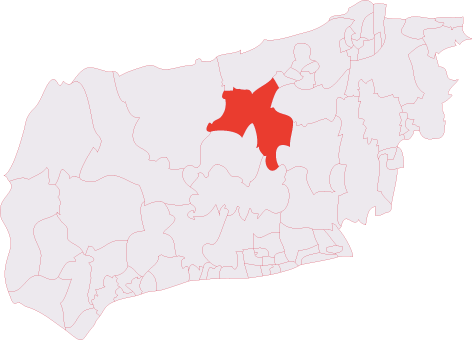
Billingshurst
Shown within West Sussex
District:	Horsham
UK Parliament Constituency:	Horsham
Ceremonial county:	West Sussex
Electorate (2009):	8195
County Councillor
Amanda Jupp (Con)

Billingshurst is an electoral division of West Sussex in the United Kingdom and returns one member to sit on West Sussex County Council.

== Extent ==
The division covers the villages of Billingshurst, Coolham, Itchingfield and Shipley; and the hamlets of Adversane, Barns Green and Coneyhurst.

It comprises the following Horsham District wards: Billingshurst & Shipley Ward and the southern part of Itchingfield, Slinfold & Warnham Ward; and of the following civil parishes: Billingshurst, Itchingfield and Warnham.

== Election results ==
=== 2021 election ===
Results of the election held on 6 May 2021:

Billingshurst
Party	Candidate	Votes	%	±%
Conservative	Amanda Jupp	2,051	53.0	−10.3
Labour	Christopher Henson	723	18.7	+9.3
Liberal Democrats	Chris Geeson	719	18.6	+0.4
Green	Emma Rothwell	375	9.7	N/A
Majority		1,328		
Conservative hold		Swing		

=== 2017 election ===
Results of the election held on 4 May 2017:

Billingshurst
Party	Candidate	Votes	%	±%
Conservative	Amanda Jupp	1,898	63.3	+20.5
Liberal Democrats	Richard Greenwood	545	18.2	+8.6
Labour	Robert Brown	283	9.4	+0.7
UKIP	Graham Harper	271	9.0	−29.8
Majority		1,353	45.1	+41.1
Turnout		2,997	32.5	+4.9
Conservative hold		Swing		

=== 2013 Election ===
Results of the election held on 2 May 2013:

Billingshurst
Party	Candidate	Votes	%	±%
Conservative	Amanda Jupp	1,013	42.8	−11.3
UKIP	David Duke	919	38.8	+16.7
Liberal Democrats	Gillian Knight	228	9.6	−9.1
Labour	Keith Maslin	206	8.7	+3.6
Majority		994	4.0	−28.0
Turnout		2,366	27.6	−10.8
Conservative hold		Swing	14.0 Con to UKIP	

=== 2009 Election ===
Results of the election held on 4 June 2009:

Billingshurst
Party	Candidate	Votes	%	±%
Conservative	Amanda Jupp	1,701	54.1	+3.5
UKIP	David Duke	694	22.1	N/A
Liberal Democrats	Larissa Rowe	588	18.7	−17.0
Labour	Chris Conibear	160	5.1	−8.6
Majority		1,007	32.0	+17.1
Turnout		3,143	38.4	−28.1
Conservative hold		Swing		

=== 2005 Election ===
Results of the election held on 5 May 2005:

Billingshurst
Party	Candidate	Votes	%	±%
Conservative	Mr O J Davies	2,950	50.6	
Liberal Democrats	Mr G F H Lawes	2,078	35.7	
Labour	Ms S Morton	797	13.7	
Majority		872	14.9	
Turnout		5,825	66.5	
Conservative win (new seat)				
