= Heath End =

Heath End may refer to several places in the United Kingdom:

- Heath End, Buckinghamshire
- Heath End, Hampshire
- Heath End, Surrey
- Heath End, Walsall, an area in Walsall, West Midlands
- Heath End, West Sussex, a place in West Sussex
- Heath End, Nuneaton, an area in Nuneaton, Warwickshire
- Heath End, Leicestershire, a hamlet north of Ashby-de-la-Zouch
