= Atherington =

Atherington may refer to:

- Atherington, Devon
- Atherington, West Sussex
- Atherington Priory, a priory in West Sussex, England
