= Oving =

Oving may refer to:

- Oving, Buckinghamshire
- Oving, West Sussex
