= North Horsham =

Civil parish in West Sussex, England

Coordinates: 51.08189°N 0.30124°W

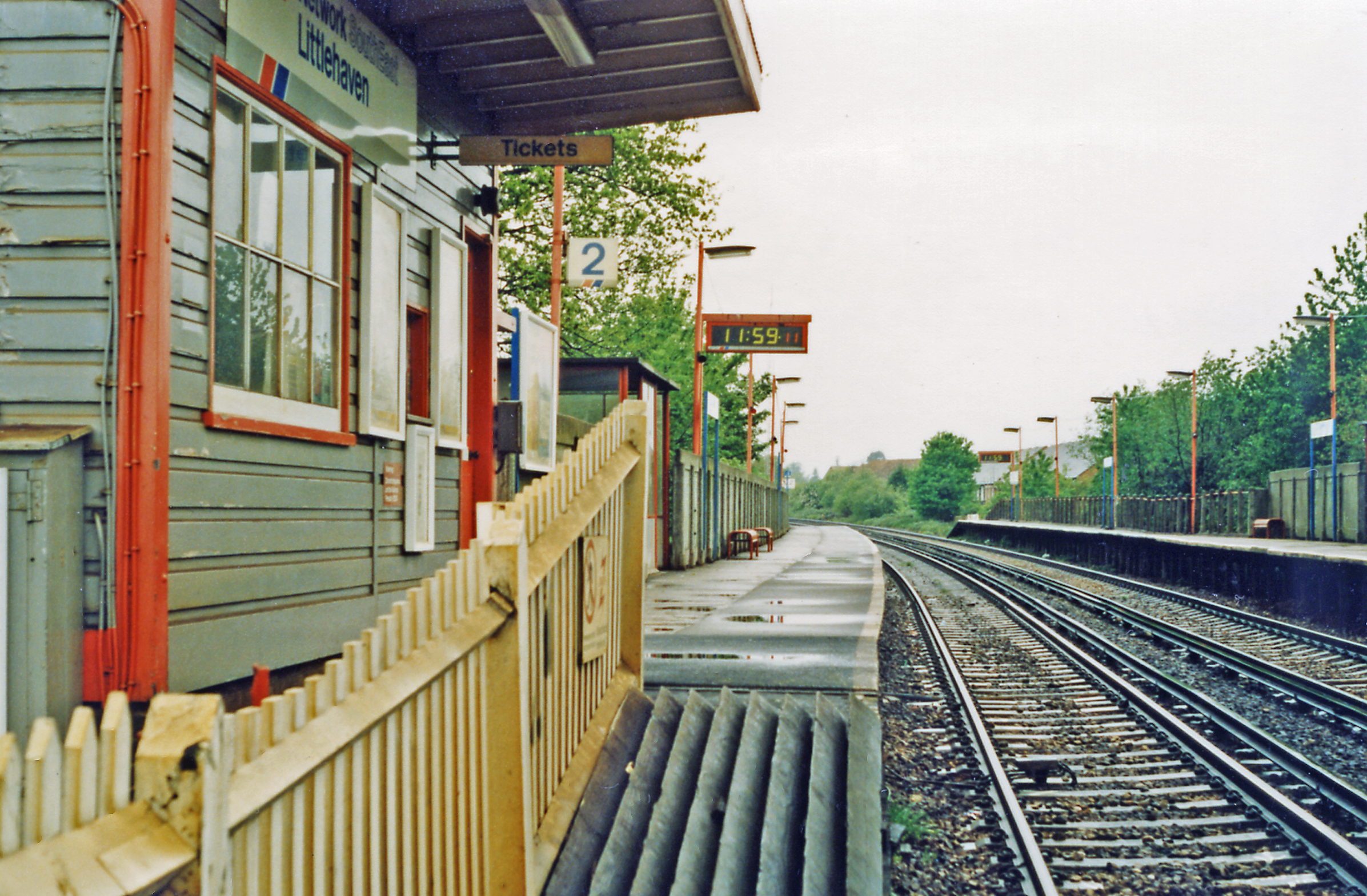
- Littlehaven railway station, 1997

- Location within West Sussex
- Area: 10.95 km^{2} (4.23 sq mi)
- Population: 21,348 2001 Census; 21,981 (2011 Census)
  - Density: 1,950/km^{2} (5,100/sq mi)
- OS grid reference: TQ190327
  - London: 30 miles (48 km) NNE
- Civil parish: North Horsham
- District: Horsham
- Shire county: West Sussex
- Region: South East
- Country: England
- Sovereign state: United Kingdom
- Post town: HORSHAM
- Postcode district: RH12
- Dialling code: 01403
- Police: Sussex
- Fire: West Sussex
- Ambulance: South East Coast
- UK Parliament: Horsham
- Website: http://www.northhorsham-pc.gov.uk/

North Horsham is a civil parish in the district of Horsham in West Sussex, England, covering the northern part of the Horsham town area. According to the 2001 census the district had a population of 21,348, increasing slightly to 21,981 at the 2011 Census.

Places within the parish include Roffey, Littlehaven, Holbrook, Old Holbrook & North Heath. Littlehaven railway station serves the parish.
