= Upper Rapeland Wood =

Wood in West Sussex, England

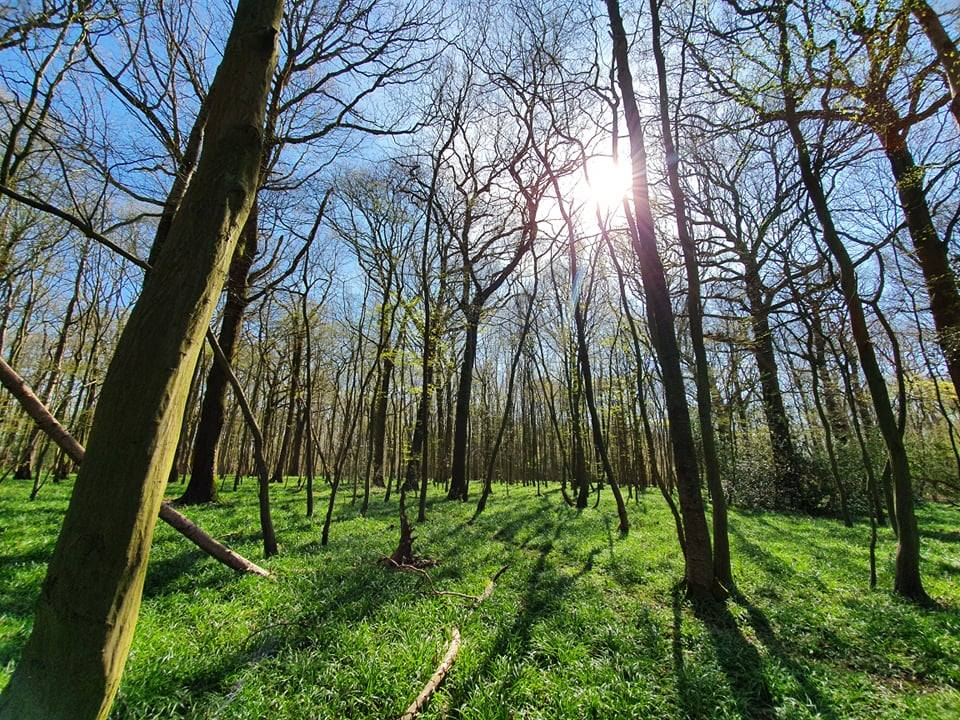
- Interactive map of Upper Rapeland Wood
- Type: Mixed woodland
- Location: Old Holbrook, Horsham, England
- OS grid: TQ188354
- Coordinates: 51°06′20.2″N 0°18′16.1″W
- Area: 0.04 m^{2} (0.43 sq ft)

Upper Rapeland Wood (sometimes Upper Rapelands Wood) is a mixed mature woodland in Old Holbrook, a hamlet close to Horsham, England. It lies on Rapeland Hill, on the north-western fringes of Old Holbrook, 1.2 miles (1.94 km) north of the A264 dual carriageway. It is directly opposite Northlands Copse, an area of ancient woodland and a partially managed plantation in the neighbouring hamlet of Graylands.

As the area lies on a steep hill, Upper Rapeland Wood has a relatively high elevation, being 350 feet above sea level. Broadleaf trees are prevalent in the moss-covered northern and southern areas of the woodland, with large pine trees and shallow ravines dominating the central areas. Notably, three channels of Northlands Gill flow through the width of Upper Rapeland Wood.

The area hosts a network of tracks with varying degrees of accessibility. Although unmaintained, the tracks guide walkers in cardinal directions through the woodland.

Intensive prospecting for iron ore took place in the area in the 16th and 17th centuries. Geologists have noted the remains of an isolated mine pit in Upper Rapeland Wood. The wood lies at the centre of the Faygate Syncline, which runs between the Crawley Fault and the Holmbush Fault. Most iron pits along the Faygate Syncline are on the Horsham Stone horizon, but the one in Upper Rapeland Wood is anomalous in that it is on an outcrop of sandstone. A small stream has cut a deep valley through the wood and this may be responsible for exposing ironstone in a very localised area.

The 1892–1914 25-inch Ordnance Survey map marks "Dismal Castle" on the northwestern border of the wood. This was demolished sometime during the 20th Century and no trace now remains.

== Gallery ==
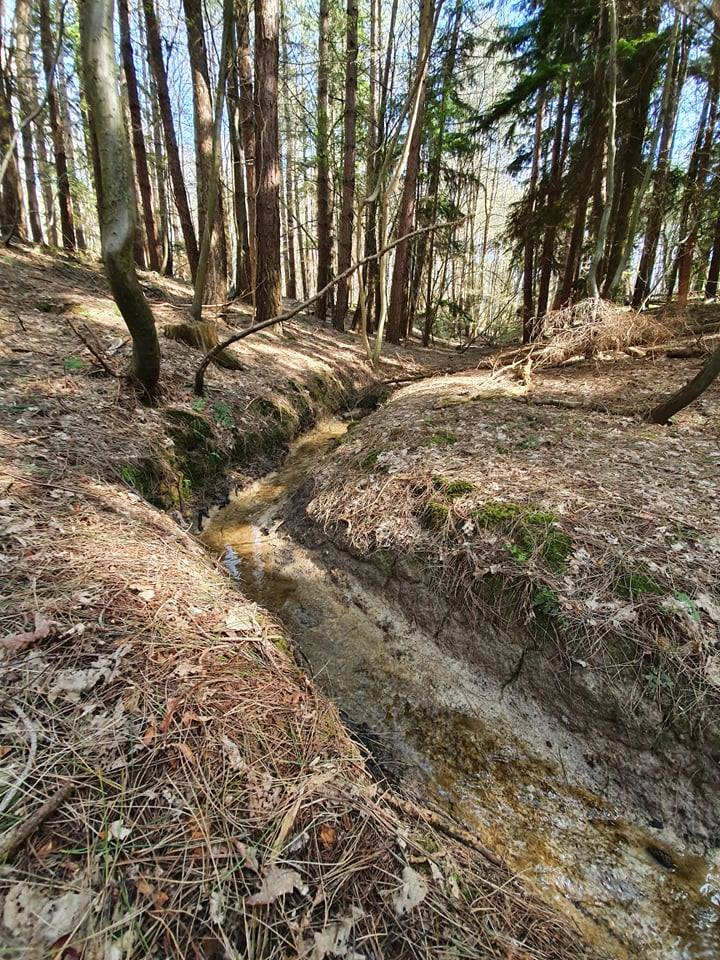
Pine trees and ravines dominate the central areas of the woodland

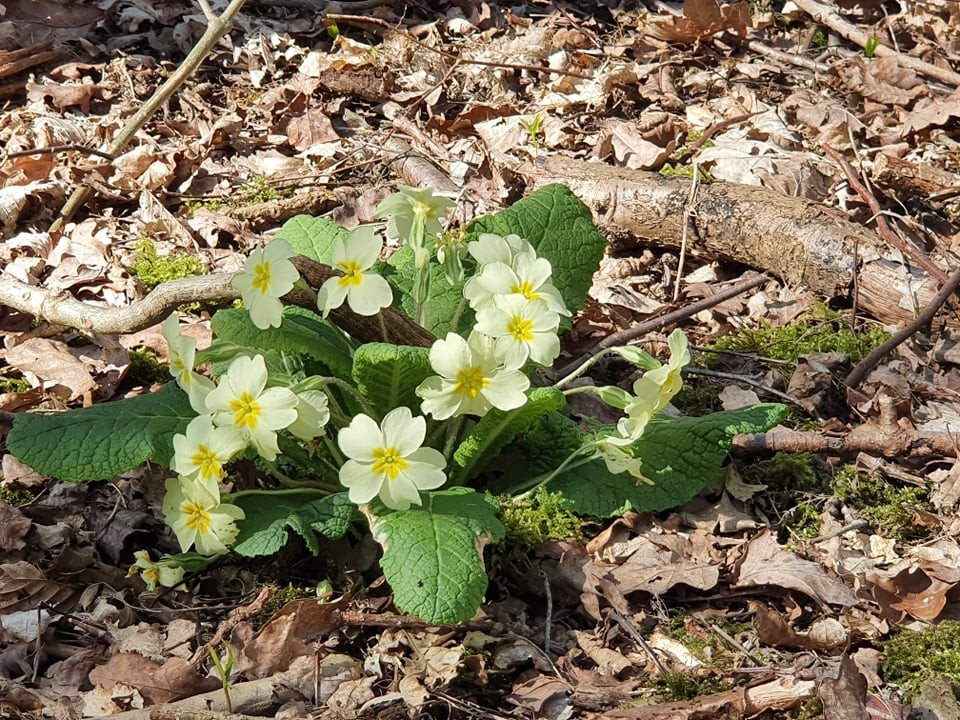
Plants such as common primrose can be seen in these woods

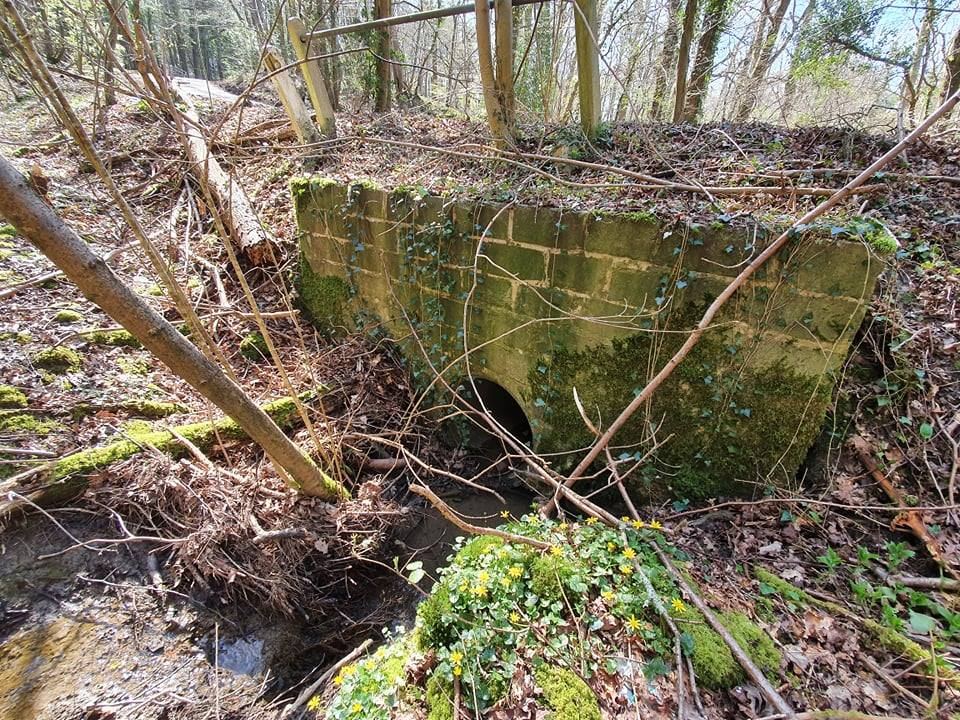
A bridge allows Northlands Gill to flow into Upper Rapeland Wood

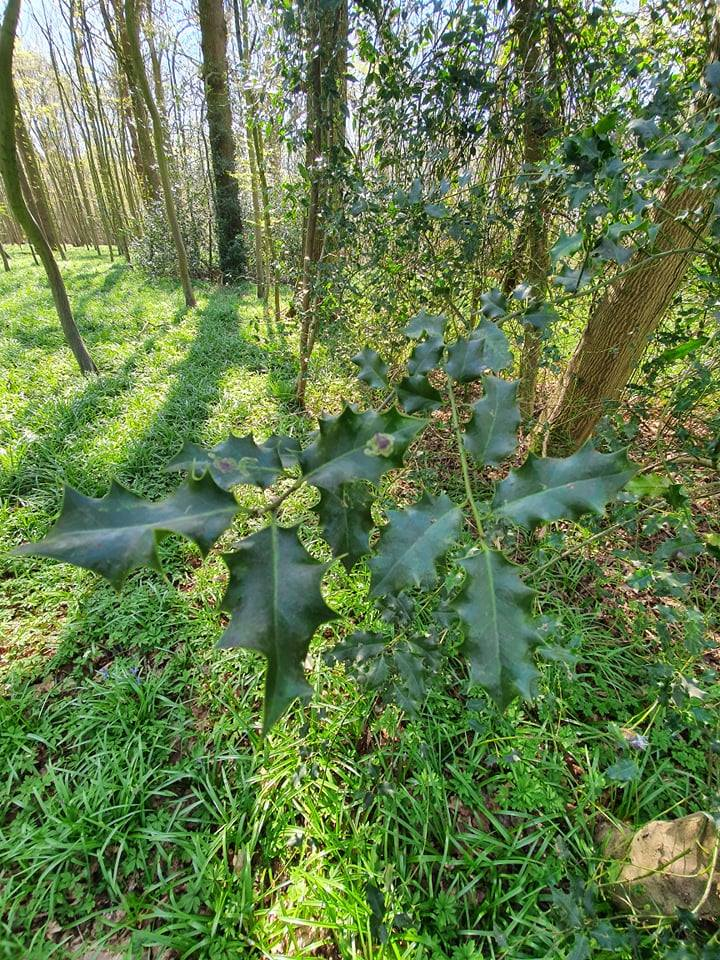
Holly leaves on a plant in the north of the woodland
