= The Sanctuary (community) =

Utopian community in West Sussex, England

Coordinates: 50°55′2.27″N 0°25′12.48″W

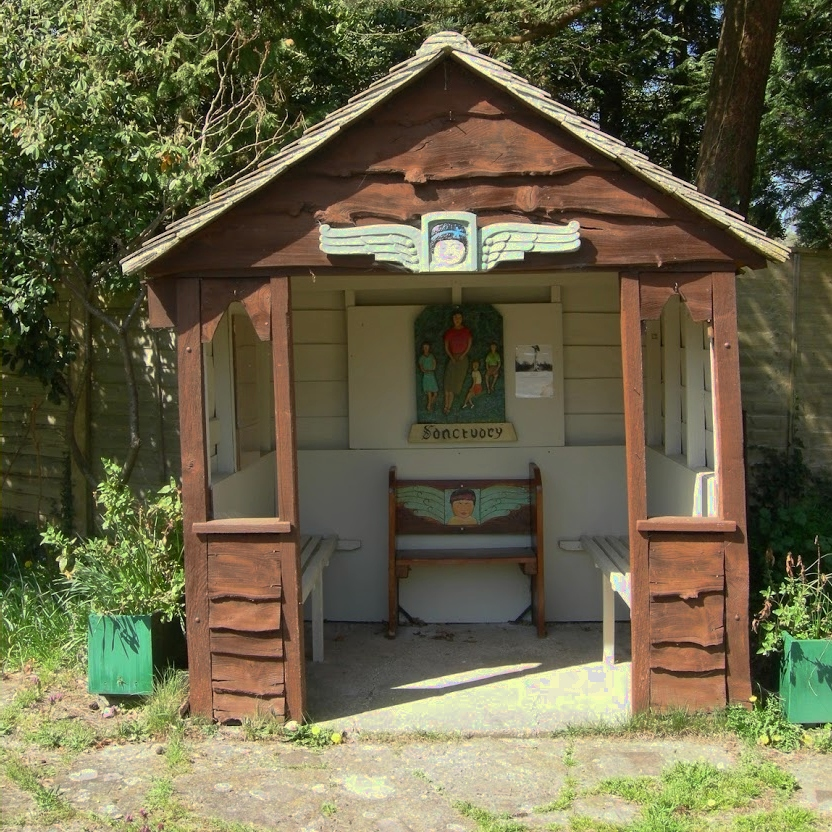
The wooden shelter commemorating the Sanctuary at Heath Common, Washington.

The Sanctuary, near Storrington in West Sussex, England, was a utopian community which was founded in 1923 and lasted about a decade.

== Founding and concept ==
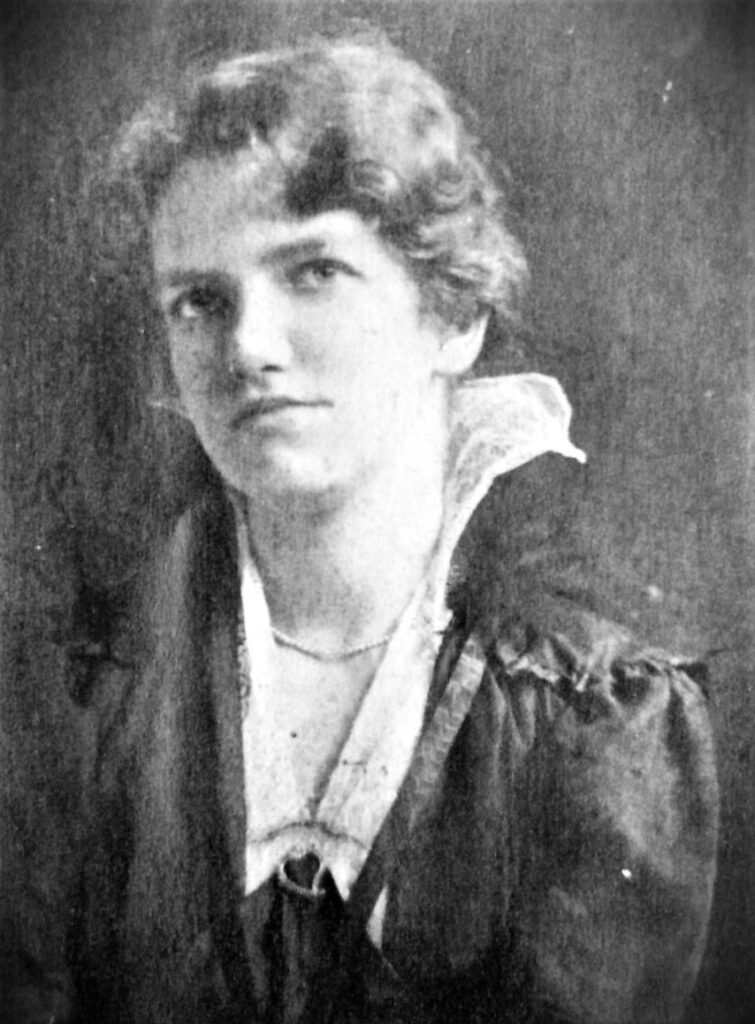
Pragnell c.1920

The founder and central figure of The Sanctuary community was the English film researcher, script writer and journalist Vera Gwendolen Pragnell (23 September 1896 – 24 October 1968) the daughter of textile manufacturer Sir George Pragnell. In 1927, Vera married Edward Dennis Earle, an artist; Pragnell later wrote under the name Vera Denis-Earle. They had one daughter, Deirdre.

Using her inheritance, she purchased 50 acres of land at Heath Common and proceeded to give away plots of land free of charge to anyone who was willing to settle there. She lived in a house she named Sanctuary Cottage, part of which was kept open for any passing stranger who needed shelter or refreshment.

Vera Pragnell was inspired both by Christianity (in particular William E. Orchard and the Fellowship of Reconciliation) as well as the principles of pioneering socialist Edward Carpenter. She insisted that The Sanctuary was open to everyone. Initially, all who came to live there were given a half-acre plot on which they would park a caravan or build a simple house. Eventually communal facilities were created such as a shop, a school and a building used for theatre and dancing. Settlers at The Sanctuary ate a limited vegetarian diet but faced difficulties growing fruit and vegetables because of poor soil.

Lacking a single political or spiritual focus, The Sanctuary attracted a wide range of individuals as residents or visitors, often with unorthodox and radical views. These included pagans such as the occultist, poet and publisher Victor Neuburg and Dion Byngham, ex-leading light of the Order of Woodcraft Chivalry. Other residents included anarchist W. C. Owen as well as Communist Party members. Artists were also attracted to the community, such as the landscape artist William Heaton Cooper and the Shakespearean actor Wilfred Walter.

A number of the residents and visitors were friends and associates of Edward Carpenter, who was a supporter and inspiration to the community. In 1928, Vera Pragnell published her book "The Story of the Sanctuary" and dedicated it to the "splendid pioneer" Edward Carpenter with a poem by Victor Neuburg praising Carpenter as "our Youth's doyen". Vera had a personal connection with Carpenter, as in 1927 she had married the painter Dennis Earle, who had previously been known as Ted Earle when he was Carpenter's lover

== Decline ==
The unconventional lifestyles of some members of the community began to generate scandal in the popular press, with stories featuring nudism and 'free love' and allegations that they encouraged a girl to run away from home and live at the Sanctuary

By the early 1930s, Vera Pragnell's original inspiration had been lost amid disputes and disillusionment. Sanctuary residents began to register formal ownership of their own properties and from 1934 onwards the area was developed by Earle as a residential estate known as Longbury Hill.

During World War II, the Kenyan independence leader Jomo Kenyatta lived in the area whilst working on a local farm. Communist Party youth camps continued to be held there until the 1960s.

== Legacy ==
Today, the history of the area is remembered in the street names Vera's Walk and Sanctuary Lane and the houses known as Sanctuary Cottages. A memorial shelter remains, erected and decorated by Dennis Earle, containing boards telling the story of The Sanctuary.

The area known as The Sanctuary was located in the parish of Washington, West Sussex (not Storrington). Vera Pragnell and Dennis Earle are buried in the graveyard at Washington Parish Church.

A play entitled Sanctuary, featuring Vera Pragnell and Victor Neuburg, written by Chris Green, was presented at the 2012 Brighton Fringe Festival.
