= Donnington, West Sussex =

Village and parish in West Sussex, England

Coordinates: 50.81174°N 0.78796°W

Donnington
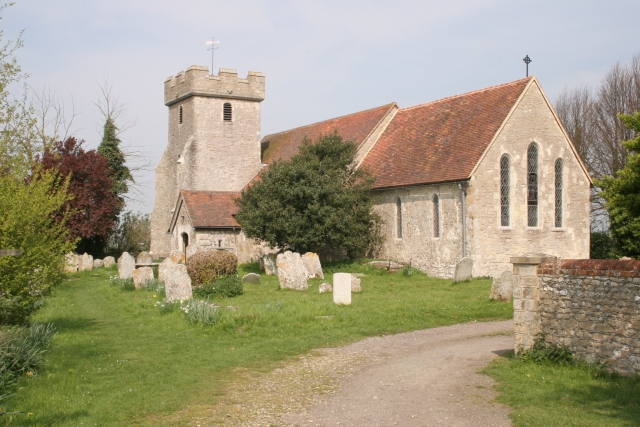
- St George's Church

- Location within West Sussex
- Area: 4.52 km^{2} (1.75 sq mi)
- Population: 2,059. 2011 Census
  - Density: 431/km^{2} (1,120/sq mi)
- OS grid reference: SU854020
  - London: 56 miles (90 km) NNE
- Civil parish: Donnington
- District: Chichester
- Shire county: West Sussex
- Region: South East
- Country: England
- Sovereign state: United Kingdom
- Post town: CHICHESTER
- Postcode district: PO20
- Dialling code: 01243
- Police: Sussex
- Fire: West Sussex
- Ambulance: South East Coast
- UK Parliament: Chichester
- Website: http://www.donningtonpc.org.uk/

Donnington is a small village, ecclesiastical parish and civil parish in the Chichester district of West Sussex, England. The village lies on the B2201 road, 2 miles (3.2 km) south of the centre of Chichester, within the Chichester built-up area. The northern part of the parish comprises the Stockbridge area of the City of Chichester.

The village lies on the Chichester Canal. The parish is also home to the Sussex Falconry Centre.

== Governance ==
An electoral ward of the same name exists. This ward includes Appledram, and at the 2011 census had a population of 2,228.

== History ==
Donnington is listed in the Domesday Book of 1086 in the Hundred of Stockbridge as having 21 households.

In the 19th century, Donnington comprised 1,029 acres (416 ha), a population of less than 200, and a parish school.
