= Graylands =

Hamlet in West Sussex, England

Coordinates: 51.091970°N 0.318035°W

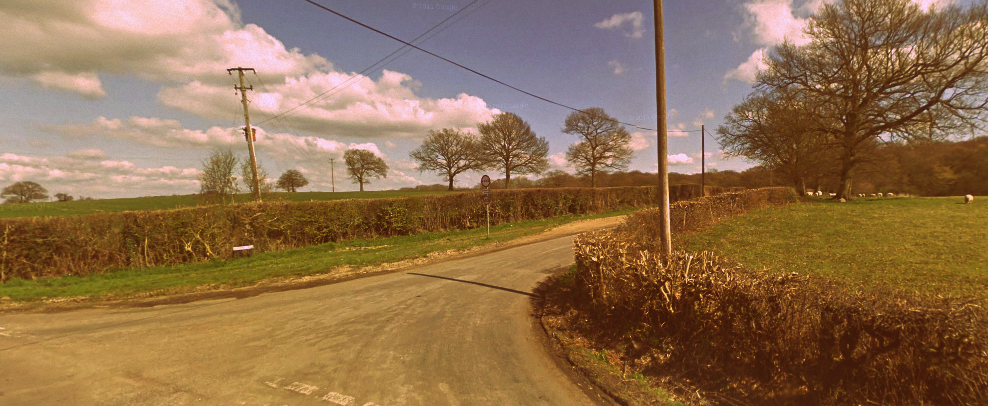
- Junction of Langhurstwood Road and Green Lane.

- Location within West Sussex
- OS grid reference: TQ178338
- District: Horsham
- Shire county: West Sussex
- Region: South East
- Country: England
- Sovereign state: United Kingdom
- Police: Sussex
- Fire: West Sussex
- Ambulance: South East Coast

Graylands is a hamlet in the Horsham district of West Sussex, England. The largely rural hamlet is located north of Holbrook beyond the A264. It is bordered by Langhurstwood Road to the west, Old Holbrook to the east, and Green Lane on its northern perimeter.

== History ==
The name Graylands originates from Graylands Farm, an estate which was acquired in 1647 for the use of John Rowland of Horsham, consisting of "barns, buildings and land". The estate was later administrated by diamond pioneer Henry Boyd Wallis until his death in 1908. A medieval moat exists immediately north of Graylands Farm, named Graylands Moat. Ornamental trees cover the interior of the moat, whilst the ditches of the moat are waterlogged.

Holbrook House falls within the eastern perimeter of the hamlet, build in an Italian Neoclassical architecture style. Robert Henry Hurst (senior), Member of Parliament for Horsham between 1832–1841 and 1844–1857, lived in the property. Apartments and residential housing now exist in this estate.

The construction of the A264 North Horsham bypass in 1989 re-defined the boundaries of Graylands. The hamlet was no longer directly connected to Horsham proper due to the A road, insulating Graylands from any urban development. The rural nature of Graylands is currently at stake due to the planned land development in the area.

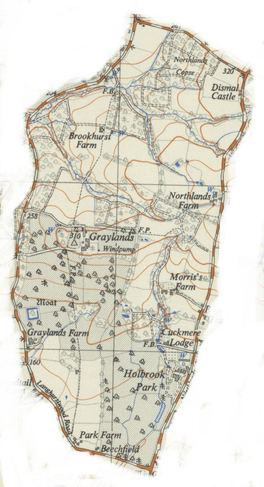
A map of Graylands, circa 1937.

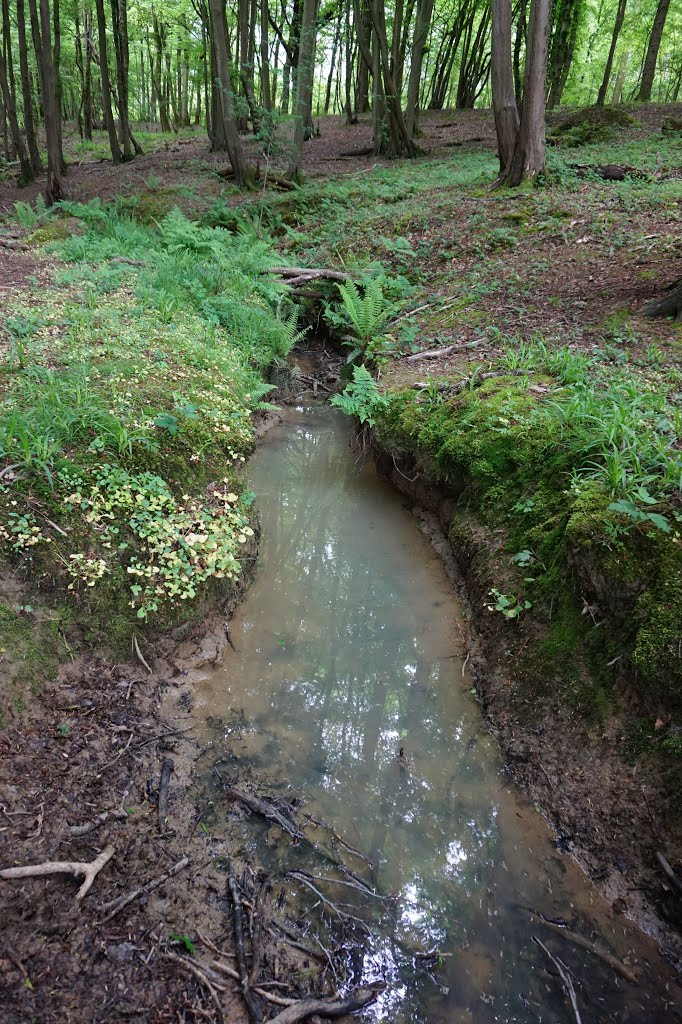
Northlands Gill is a stream stretching the width of Graylands.

== Topography ==
Graylands contains extensive patches of woodland typical of rural hamlets in West Sussex, namely;

- Graylands Copse; A largely inaccessible woodland in south-central Graylands.
- Graylands Plantation; West Sussex Footpath 1421 runs through this woodland
- The Knob; North of Graylands Plantation, West Sussex Footpath 1421 runs through this woodland
- Morris's Wood; Adjacent to The Knob, West Sussex Footpath 1573 runs through this woodland
- Holbrook Plantation
- Brookhurst Wood; Adjacent to the Langhurstwood Quarry/Clay Pit
- Brookhurst Plantation; Inaccessible woodland encased within the Langhurstwood Quarry/Clay Pit.
- Well Copse; West Sussex Footpath 1421 runs through this small thicket.
- Northlands Copse; Northernmost woodland within the Graylands hamlet.
- Barn Coppice; Ancient woodland with an irregular interior containing a water-filled pit in the centre.

There are also a number of narrow streams within Graylands;

- Northlands Gill; a narrow stream stretching the entire width of Graylands.
- Great Brookhurst Gill; a narrow stream in northern Graylands, leading to an unnamed pond in The Knob.
- Holbrook Gill; a narrow stream in the south east of Graylands, draining into the Holbrook House estate.

== Industry ==
Graylands is a largely an agricultural area in the central and southern areas, containing rapeseed fields. The northern areas of Graylands are more forested and less agrarian, with a clay pit named Langhurstwood Quarry existing in the north west of the hamlet, dating back to 1888. The quarry produces Weald-clay bricks for use on local and regional projects.

The original Graylands Farm estate in central Graylands contains a number of business offices, including a ceramics research facility.
