= Coldwaltham =

Village and parish in West Sussex, England

Coordinates: 50.93911°N 0.54389°W

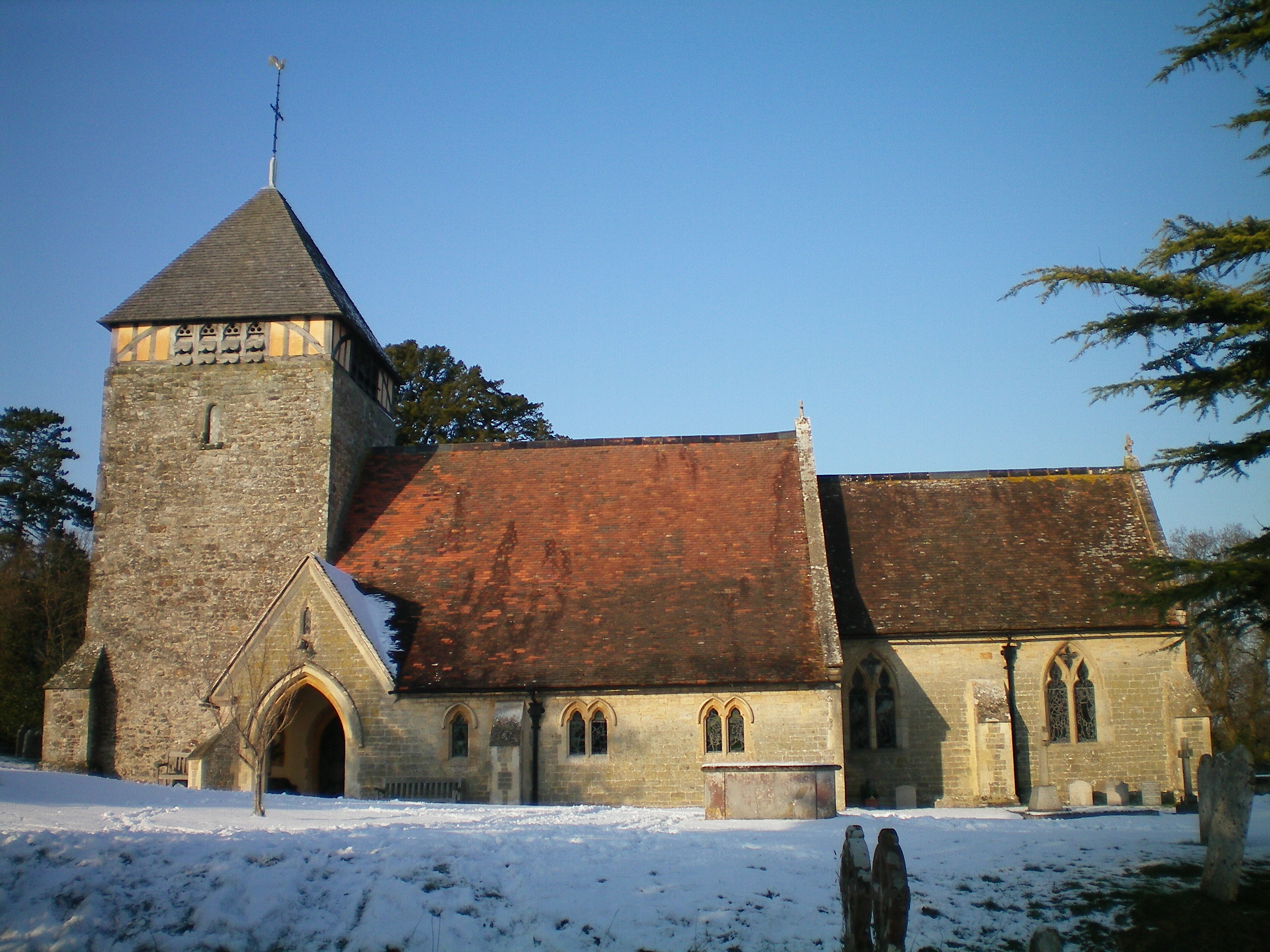
- St Giles’ Church

- Location within West Sussex
- Area: 8.93 km^{2} (3.45 sq mi)
- Population: 845 2001 Census; 941 (2011 Census)
  - Density: 95/km^{2} (250/sq mi)
- OS grid reference: TQ024165
  - London: 43 miles (69 km) NNE
- Civil parish: Coldwaltham
- District: Horsham
- Shire county: West Sussex
- Region: South East
- Country: England
- Sovereign state: United Kingdom
- Post town: PULBOROUGH
- Postcode district: RH20
- Dialling code: 01798
- Police: Sussex
- Fire: West Sussex
- Ambulance: South East Coast
- UK Parliament: Arundel and South Downs

Coldwaltham is a village and civil parish in the Horsham District of West Sussex, England. It is divided in two by the A29 road and lies 2.4 miles (3.9 km) southwest of Pulborough which has both a railway station on the Arun Valley Line and a bus connection to Worthing. It is around a 30-minute drive from Gatwick Airport. The 2011 Census population included the village of Hardham plus hamlet of Watersfield.

The 13th-century Anglican parish church is dedicated to Saint Giles; a rare 11th-century gravestone and a simple Saxon font are present on the site. A yew tree near the north west corner is among the oldest in England, believed to be over 3000 years old. There is one pub, the Labouring Man. Sandham Hall is used for village events.

The Church of England primary school shares a headteacher with Amberley School.
