= Old Holbrook =

Hamlet in West Sussex, England

Coordinates: 51.091970°N 0.318035°W

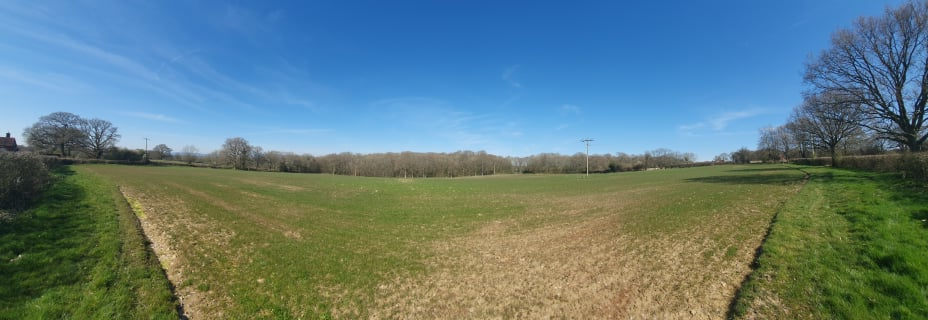
- Farmland facing Upper Rapeland Wood

- Location within West Sussex
- OS grid reference: TQ184339
- District: Horsham
- Shire county: West Sussex
- Region: South East
- Country: England
- Sovereign state: United Kingdom
- Police: Sussex
- Fire: West Sussex
- Ambulance: South East Coast

Old Holbrook (formerly known as Northlands) is a hamlet in the Horsham district of West Sussex, England. This rural hamlet is located north of the Horsham residential area of Holbrook beyond the A264. It is bordered by Graylands to the west, Wimlands to the east, and Green Lane on its northern perimeter.

== History ==
The etymology of Old Holbrook has changed throughout history.

The name Holbrook itself originates from the feeder stream of the River Arun. Prior to the construction of the A264 dual carriageway, the area was simply known as Northlands, named after a farm located on Rapeland Hill. After the completion of the A264 in 1989, the main lane was renamed Old Holbrook to distinguish it from the newer Horsham residential area of Holbrook.

Old Holbrook has a largely agricultural history, with scattered farmhouses dating from the 16th century post-medieval period. Established in 1537, Rapeland Farm remains one of the oldest properties located in the hamlet. Rapeland gives its name to 'a place where rape grows', referring to rapeseed plants.

In the south of the hamlet, there exists a historical 17th century moated house, formerly occupied by Horsham member of parliament Robert Henry Hurst.

In July 2015, a crop circle appeared in a field of young wheat adjacent to Upper Rapeland Wood, in the north of the hamlet.

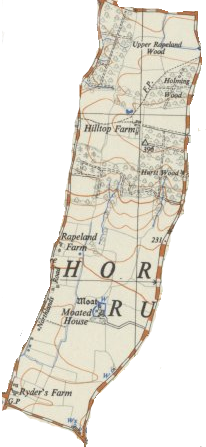
A map of Old Holbrook, circa 1937.

== Topography ==
Old Holbrook is a hamlet of small irregular fields bounded by hedgerows and intermixed with grazing and woodland. The hamlet sits on Rapeland Hill, reaching an elevation of 194 feet above sea level.

Specific features include;

- Upper Rapeland Wood; a large block of mixed mature woodland
- Holming Wood; mature mixed woodland.
- Lower Rapeland Plantation; mature mixed woodland with ancient oaks.
- Furzefield Copse; mixed woodland with ancient oaks.
- Hurst Wood; mixed woodland with ancient oaks
- Unnamed ancient woodland; the sole ancient woodland defined by a woodbank and former quarry pit in the centre, now landscaped as a pond with the surroundings cleared of trees.
- Northlands Gill; a narrow stream stretching the entire width of both Graylands and Old Holbrook.

== Industry ==
Old Holbrook is a rural area, and therefore is largely agrarian. This is reflected in the more forested north and central parts of the hamlet, where crops are grown and animal husbandry is practised.

The southern half of the hamlet is less forested with a lower elevation, making it more suitable for more contemporary commercial businesses. This area hosts a swimming school, a nursery school and an animal rescue shelter.
