= Lindfield Rural =

Civil parish in West Sussex, England

Coordinates: 51.00467°N 0.07016°W

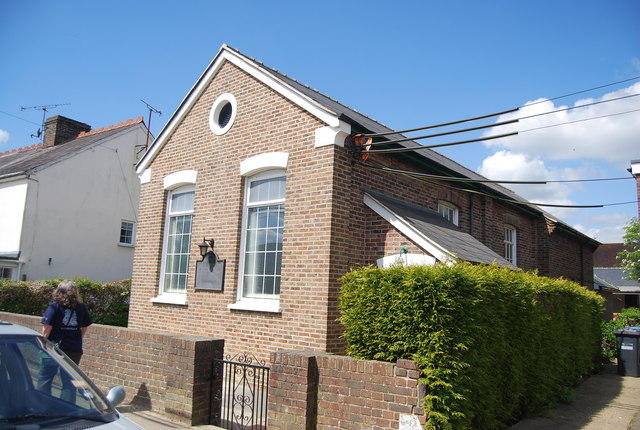
- Scaynes Hill Strict Baptist Church

- Location within West Sussex
- Area: 19.81 km^{2} (7.65 sq mi)
- Population: 2,644 2001 Census
  - Density: 133/km^{2} (340/sq mi)
- OS grid reference: TQ354245
  - London: 34 miles (55 km) N
- Civil parish: Lindfield Rural
- District: Mid Sussex
- Shire county: West Sussex
- Region: South East
- Country: England
- Sovereign state: United Kingdom
- Post town: HAYWARDS HEATH
- Postcode district: RH16
- Dialling code: 01444
- Police: Sussex
- Fire: West Sussex
- Ambulance: South East Coast
- UK Parliament: Mid Sussex
- Website: http://www.lindfieldrural-pc.org.uk/

Lindfield Rural is a civil parish in the Mid Sussex District of West Sussex, England. It is located on the southern slopes of the Weald, five miles (8 km) to the east of Haywards Heath. It covers an area of 1,981 hectares (4,900 acres) and had a population of 2,644 at the 2001 census. The parish council meets in the Millennium Hall in the village of Scaynes Hill.

== Landmarks ==
Scaynes Hill is a Site of Special Scientific Interest within the parish. The site is a disused quarry, which has exposed sandstone originating from the Wealden flood plain.
