= Hurst Wickham =

Village in West Sussex, England

Coordinates: 50.9331°N 0.16377°W

- Location within West Sussex
- OS grid reference: TQ291164
- Civil parish: Hurstpierpoint and Sayers Common
- District: Mid Sussex
- Shire county: West Sussex
- Region: South East
- Country: England
- Sovereign state: United Kingdom
- Post town: Hassocks
- Postcode district: BN6 9
- Police: Sussex
- Fire: West Sussex
- Ambulance: South East Coast
- UK Parliament: Arundel and South Downs

Hurst Wickham is a village in the Mid Sussex District of West Sussex, England. It lies just off the B2116 road, 2.1 miles (3.4 km) southeast of Burgess Hill. It is in the civil parish of Hurstpierpoint and Sayers Common. Historically a hamlet, the settlement developed into a village in the 1890s after the railway station at Hassocks opened.
