= Graylands Copse =

Woodland in West Sussex, England

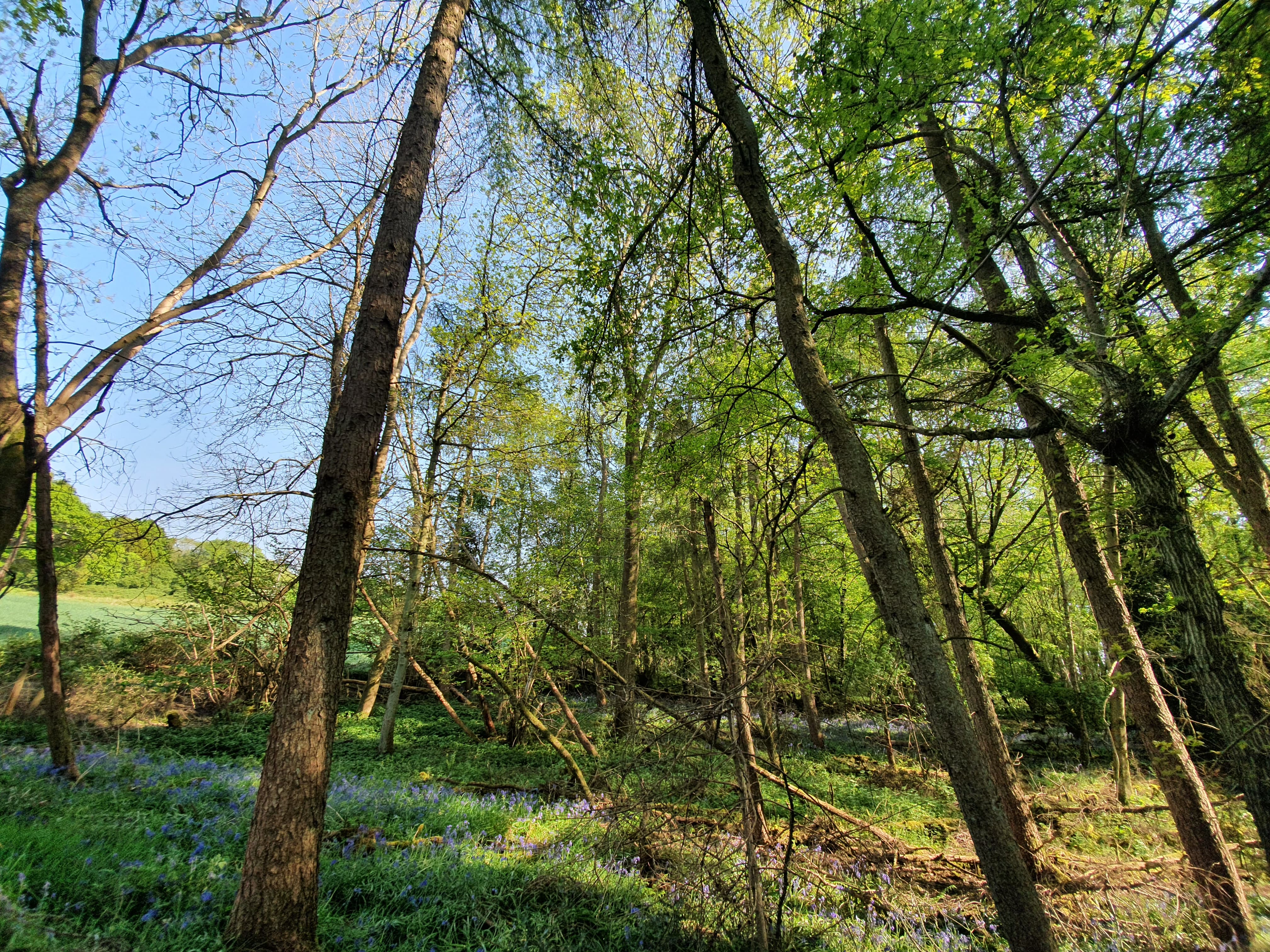
- Interactive map of Graylands Copse
- Type: Woodland
- Location: Graylands, Horsham, England
- OS grid: TQ 17843 34232
- Area: 0.01 sq mi (0.02 km^{2})

Graylands Copse is a largely inaccessible woodland in Graylands, near Horsham, England.

The woodland has a convex outline, being primarily inaccessible at all edges except for an unmaintained opening on the south-western edge, in which a footbridge had existed. The interior is very irregular, defined by dense thickets and dead wood. An unnamed stream cuts through the center of the copse.

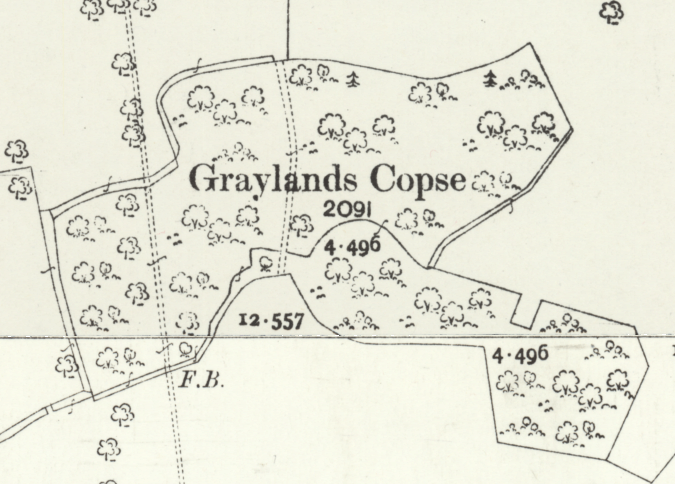
Map of Graylands Copse c.1914

A small pit exists in the opposing south-eastern corner, possibly a man-made quarry feature typical of woodland in the area. One former footpath and one track run through Graylands Copse in a north–south direction, neither are maintained or easily accessible.

Historical Ordnance Survey maps indicate that the eastern central portion (approximately 1/6) of Graylands Copse underwent a forest plantation in the mid to late 20th century to define agricultural boundaries.

Notably, a medieval moated site exists 200 metres (656 ft) from Graylands Copse.
