= Hurstpierpoint and Sayers Common =

Civil parish in West Sussex, England

Coordinates: 50.95023°N 0.19559°W

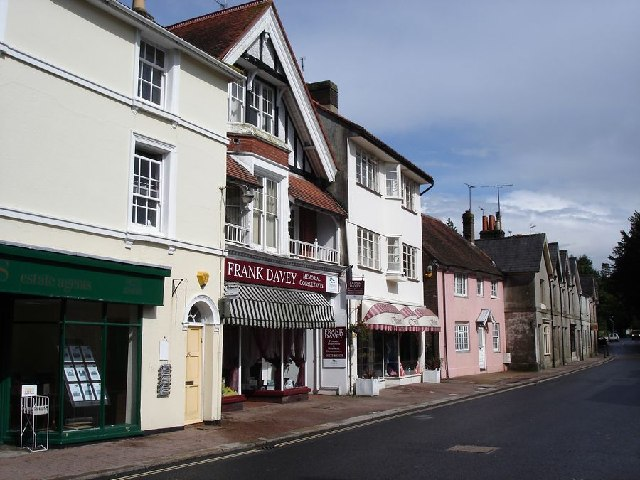
- Hurstpierpoint High Street

- Location within West Sussex
- Area: 20.30 km^{2} (7.84 sq mi)
- Population: 6,264 2001 Census; 7,112 (2011 Census)
  - Density: 309/km^{2} (800/sq mi)
- OS grid reference: TQ268183
  - London: 38 miles (61 km) N
- Civil parish: Hurstpierpoint and Sayers Common
- District: Mid Sussex
- Shire county: West Sussex
- Region: South East
- Country: England
- Sovereign state: United Kingdom
- Post town: HASSOCKS
- Postcode district: BN6
- Dialling code: 01273
- Police: Sussex
- Fire: West Sussex
- Ambulance: South East Coast
- UK Parliament: Arundel and South Downs
- Website: http://www.hurstpierpoint-pc.org.uk/

Hurstpierpoint and Sayers Common is a civil parish in Mid Sussex District, West Sussex, England.

== Settlements ==
Map

=== Major settlements ===
- Hurstpierpoint
- Sayers Common

=== Other settlements ===
- Bedlam Street
- Goddards Green
- Hurst Wickham

=== Other places ===
- Danny Park
