= Climping sand dunes =

SSSI in West Sussex, England

Coordinates: 50°48′02″N 0°33′02″W

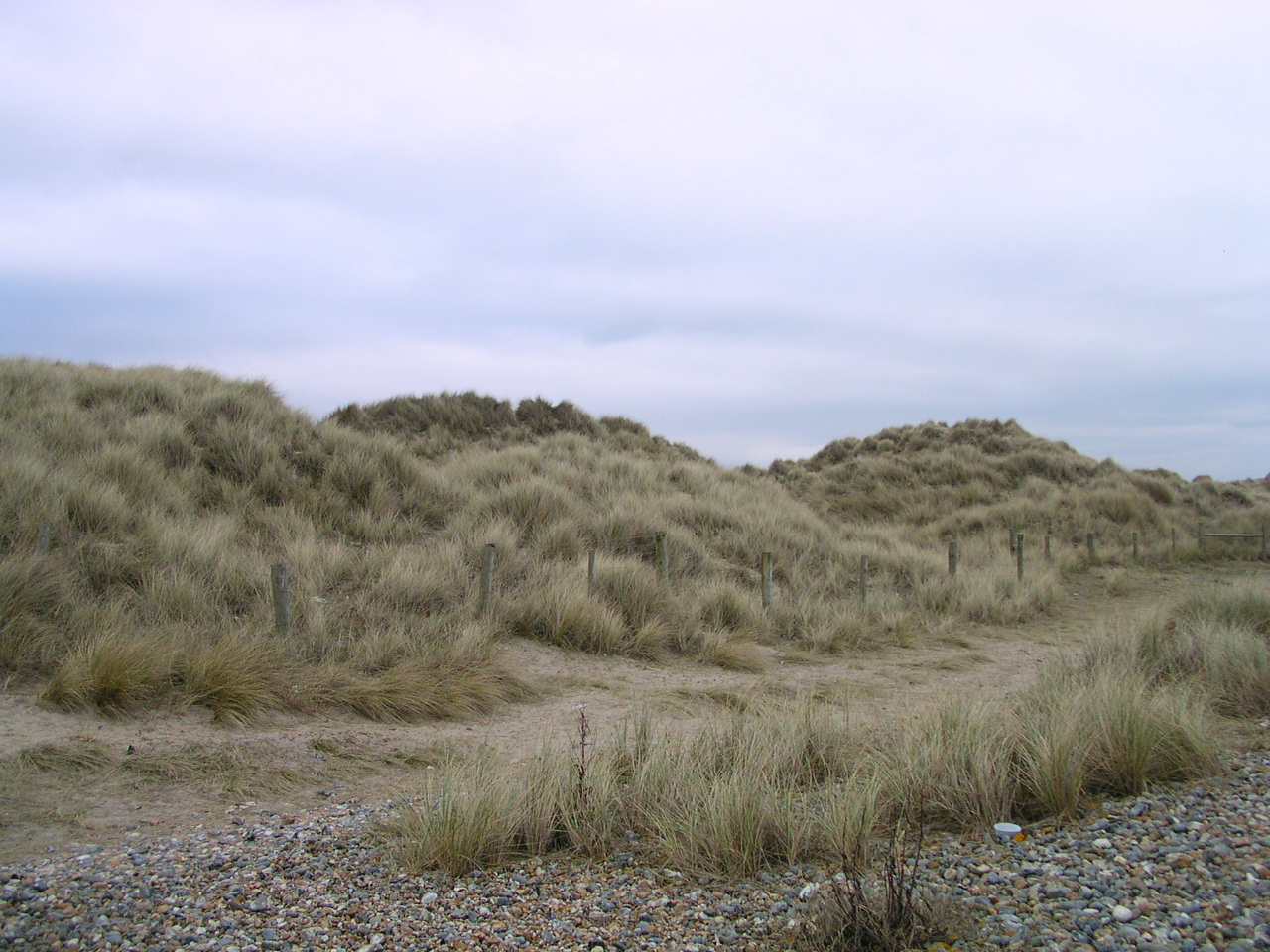

Climping Sand Dunes are a system of dunes at Climping in the Arun District of West Sussex, England located west of Littlehampton. The eastern end of the dunes adjoins the River Arun and Littlehampton Redoubt.

== Vegetation at Climping ==
Vegetation such as Marram Grass is essential for dunes to work, dominating the stabilised parts of the dunes. Other grasses that grow there include Dune Fescue and Red Fescue. Dogs off leads can easily run around the dunes, and destroy the vegetation. Horses being ridden over the dunes will have a similar effect. The Climping dunes are an SSSI (Site of Special Scientific Interest). In 2006 the total number of full species at Climping Gap stood at 256. It supports important populations of wintering birds and the numbers of wintering Sanderling, in particular, are of European significance. Vegetated shingle beaches are a nationally uncommon habitat. The beach at Climping is broad in the west but narrows to the east. Plant communities include Yellow horned poppy, Sea Kale, Sea Beet, Curled Dock, Eryngium maritimum, Sand Catchfly, Viper's Bugloss and Nottingham Catchfly.
