= Watersfield =

Hamlet in West Sussex, England

Coordinates: 50.93312°N 0.55779°W

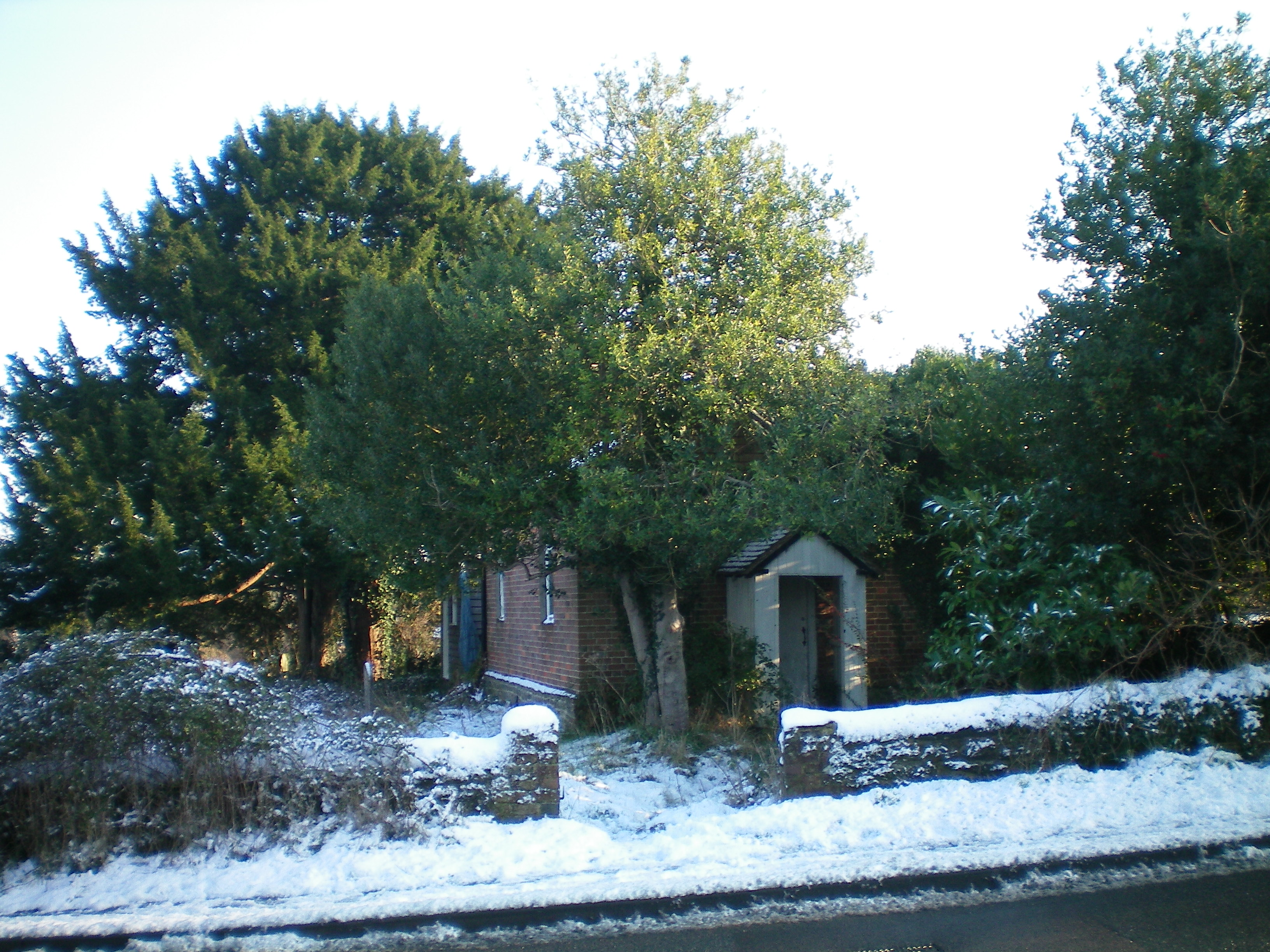
- Watersfield Chapel

- Location within West Sussex
- OS grid reference: TQ014158
- Civil parish: Coldwaltham
- District: Horsham
- Shire county: West Sussex
- Region: South East
- Country: England
- Sovereign state: United Kingdom
- Post town: Pulborough
- Postcode district: RH20 1
- Police: Sussex
- Fire: West Sussex
- Ambulance: South East Coast
- UK Parliament: Arundel and South Downs

Watersfield is a hamlet in the Horsham District of West Sussex, England. It lies on the A29 road 3.1 miles (5 km) southwest of Pulborough. At the 2011 Census the population of the Hamlet was included in the civil parish of Coldwaltham.
