= Walstead =

- Hamlet
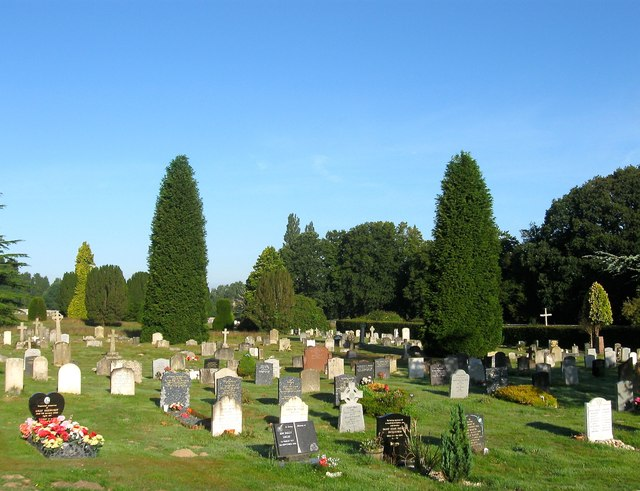
- The cemetery in Walstead

- Location within West Sussex
- Coordinates: 51°00′18″N 0°04′16″W
- Country: England
- County: West Sussex

Walstead is a hamlet located 1.5 kilometres (0.93 mi) south east of Lindfield, West Sussex, England.

== Education ==
Great Walstead School is in the hamlet.

== Community Facilities ==
Paxhill Park Golf Course is in Walstead.

There is a nursing home at Walstead Place, a country house built in 1852.

There is a council burial ground in Walstead.
