= Adversane =

Village in West Sussex, England

Coordinates: 50.99891°N 0.4707°W

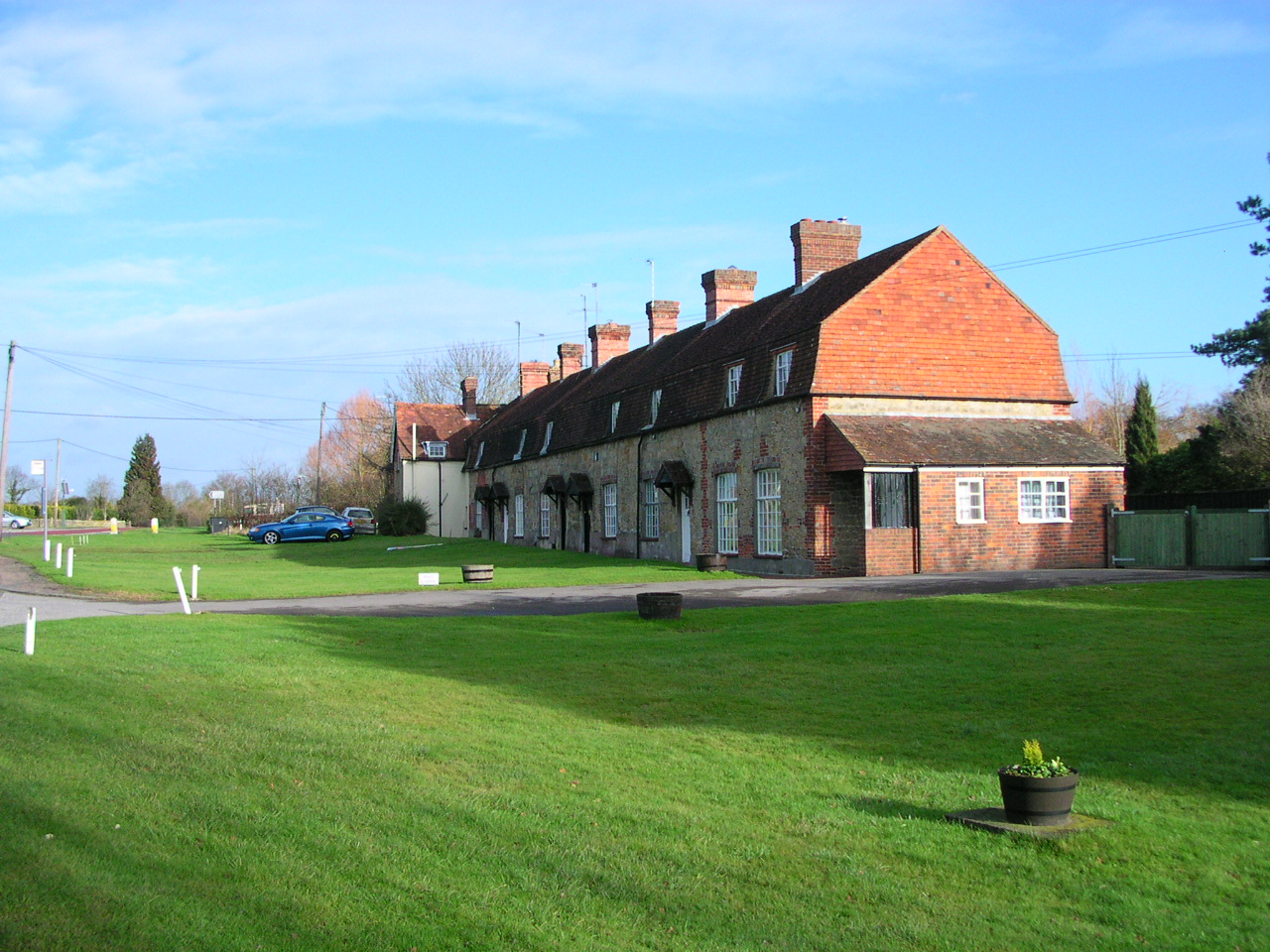
- Cottages at Adversane

- Location within West Sussex
- OS grid reference: TQ073232
- Civil parish: Billingshurst
- District: Horsham
- Shire county: West Sussex
- Region: South East
- Country: England
- Sovereign state: United Kingdom
- Post town: Billingshurst
- Postcode district: RH14 9
- Police: Sussex
- Fire: West Sussex
- Ambulance: South East Coast
- UK Parliament: Horsham

Adversane is a large hamlet in the Horsham District of West Sussex, England, located 1.5 miles south of Billingshurst (where, at the 2011 Census, the population was included). It consists of a cluster of houses and a public house (the Blacksmith's Arms, now 10/10 Restaurant) at a crossroads on the A29 road, on the Roman road named Stane Street.

Adversane means the hyrne (corner) of the estate of Hadfold and was first documented as Hadesfoldesberne in 1279. The hamlet was known as Hadfoldshern until the 1850s. The Blacksmith's Arms stands beside the site of the blacksmith's shop, where Gaius (George) Carley was the last of many smiths to work the forge until it closed in the 1960s. He lived at Grigg's Cottage, a half-timbered cottage opposite.

Stane Street cottages, opposite the pub, were probably built using the Roman road as their foundation, as the road deviates slightly at this point, returning to its straight line a little distance further on, and the sandstone houses are precisely in line with both sections of Stane Street.

They are in fact a single building, converted in the 1930s from a malt warehouse built by the Allen brothers of Horsham, whose activities are described in A History of Horsham, published by Horsham Museum. They were maltsters who smuggled malt from the continent during the Napoleonic wars and hid their contraband in secret cellars under this and several other warehouses in the Horsham area. The cellars had a tendency to flood and were filled in during the 1950s.

== In popular culture ==
Eleanor Farjeon's novels Martin Pippin in the Apple Orchard (1921) and Martin Pippin in the Daisy Field (1937) are set in Adversane.
