= Oving, West Sussex =

Village and parish in West Sussex, England

Coordinates: 50.83719°N 0.72093°W

Oving
- Village, and Civil and Ecclesiastical parish
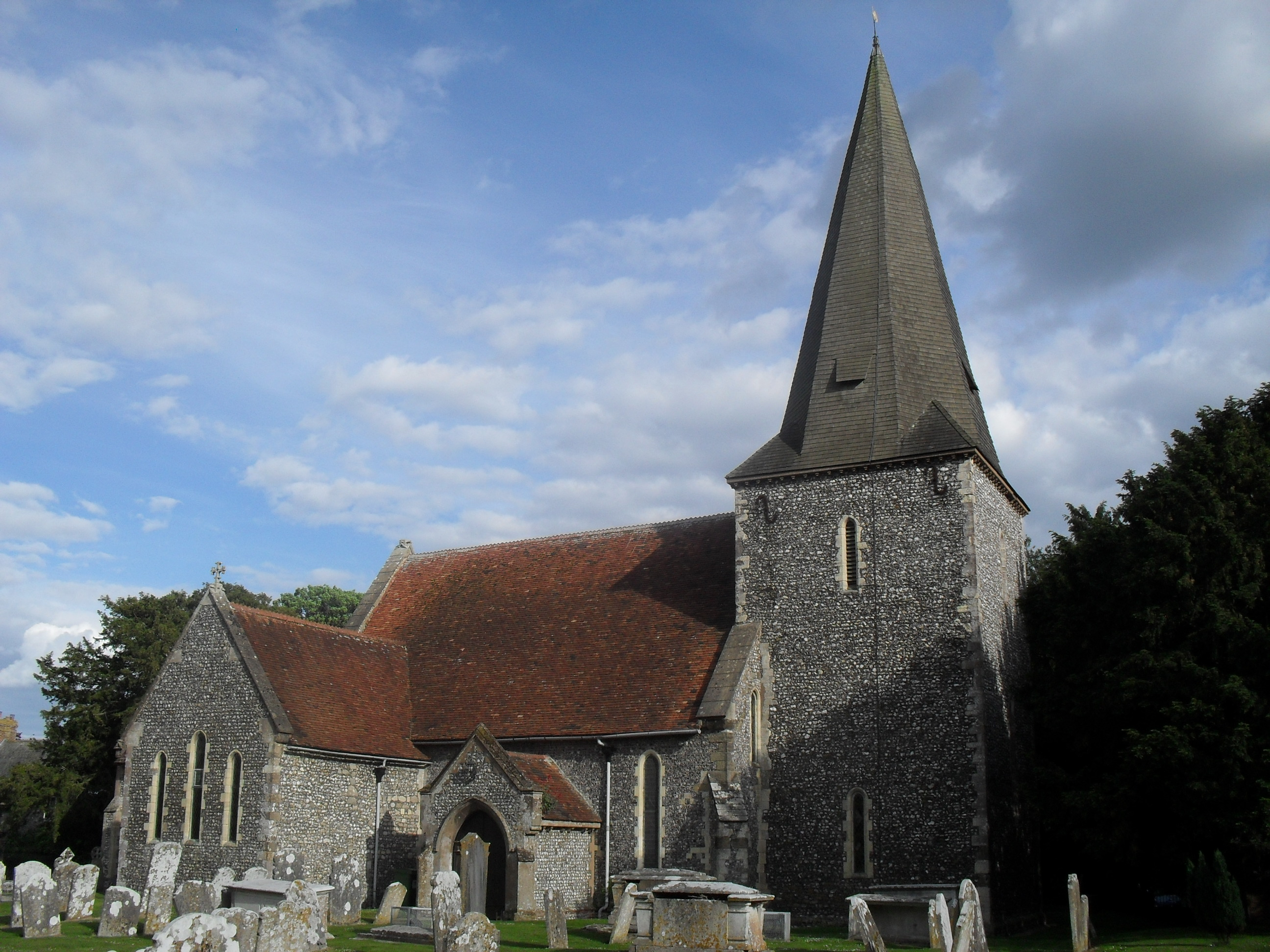
- St Andrew's Church

- Location within West Sussex
- Area: 13.96 km^{2} (5.39 sq mi)
- Population: 1,051. 2011 Census
  - Density: 73/km^{2} (190/sq mi)
- OS grid reference: SU900050
  - London: 53 miles (85 km) NNE
- Civil parish: Oving
- District: Chichester
- Shire county: West Sussex
- Region: South East
- Country: England
- Sovereign state: United Kingdom
- Post town: CHICHESTER
- Postcode district: PO20
- Dialling code: 01243
- Police: Sussex
- Fire: West Sussex
- Ambulance: South East Coast
- UK Parliament: Chichester
- Website: Oving Community

Oving is a small village, and civil and ecclesiastical parish in the Chichester District of West Sussex, England. The village lies about 2.5 miles (4.0 km) east of the city of Chichester. The civil parish includes the settlements of Colworth, Drayton, Merston, and Shopwhyke.

== History ==
Although in the ancient hundred of Boxgrove, Oving was not listed in the Domesday Book of 1086, while several surrounding villages were.

Kelly's Directory of 1867 describes the ecclesiastical parish as extending to 2,946 acres (1,192 ha) with a population of 949.

In 1894, the portion of Rumboldswyke lying outside the city limits of Chichester was added to Oving parish.

In 1895, the parish of Portfield, West Sussex was added to Oving parish.

The West Sussex Review Order of 1933 incorporated the parish of Merston into Oving, increasing the acreage of Oving to 3,013.

== Governance ==
Oving is governed by the Oving Parish Council. The chairman of the parish council is Councillor Rod Hague.

== Geography ==
The landscape is flat and is given over mainly to agriculture with some growing of salad crops close to the A259. The landscape of the western part of the parish at Drayton and Shopwhyke has been affected by gravel extraction, which has left a number of lakes that are inaccessible to the public.

== Demography ==
The parish had a population of 1,022 in the 2001 UK Census, increasing to 1,051 at the 2011 census. Half the population lives in Oving village, the rest in the smaller settlements of Shopwhyke, Drayton, Merston and Colworth.

== Amenities ==
Oving village is known for the Gribble Inn, a popular country pub with a real ale brewery attached. This is the origin of the ale, Fursty Ferret, now owned by Hall and Woodhouse. The other prominent public building is St Andrew's parish church, which dates from the 13th century.

== Listed buildings ==
There are 26 listed buildings in the parish, including the parish church of St Giles in nearby Merston.
