= Scaynes Hill =

Village in West Sussex, England

Coordinates: 50.99135°N 0.05149°W

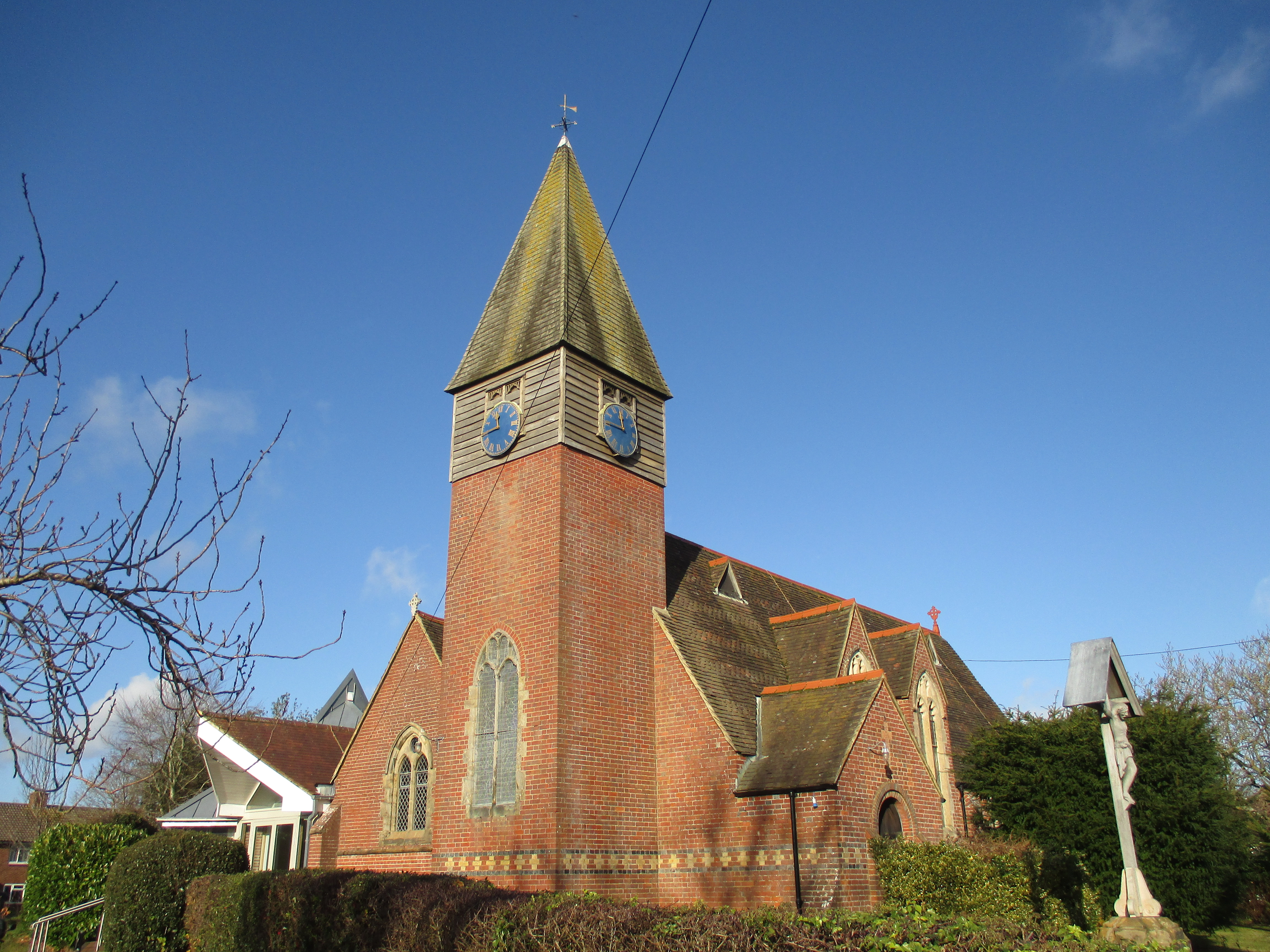
- St Augustine's Church, Scaynes Hill

- Location within West Sussex
- Population: 1,000
- OS grid reference: TQ368231
- Civil parish: Lindfield Rural
- District: Mid Sussex
- Shire county: West Sussex
- Region: South East
- Country: England
- Sovereign state: United Kingdom
- Post town: Haywards Heath
- Postcode district: RH17
- Dialling code: 01444
- Police: Sussex
- Fire: West Sussex
- Ambulance: South East Coast
- UK Parliament: East Grinstead and Uckfield

Scaynes Hill is a village in the civil parish of Lindfield Rural in the Mid Sussex District of West Sussex, England. It lies on the A272 road 2.2 miles (3.5 km) east of Haywards Heath.

== Landmarks ==
Scaynes Hill has a Site of Special Scientific Interest within the village. The site is a disused quarry, which has exposed sandstone originating from the Wealden flood plain.

The village church is dedicated to St. Augustine of Canterbury and was constructed in 1858. The church was given grade two listed status in 2006.
