= Coneyhurst =

Hamlet in West Sussex, England

Coordinates: 51.00421°N 0.42724°W

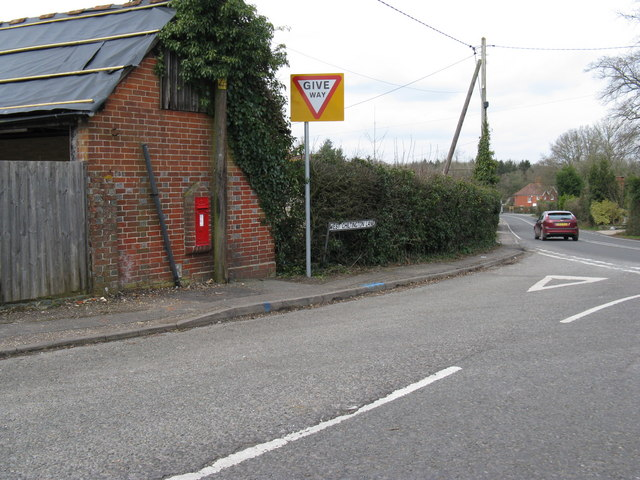
- West Chiltington Lane

- Location within West Sussex
- OS grid reference: TQ104239
- Civil parish: Billingshurst
- District: Horsham
- Shire county: West Sussex
- Region: South East
- Country: England
- Sovereign state: United Kingdom
- Post town: Billingshurst
- Postcode district: RH14 9
- Police: Sussex
- Fire: West Sussex
- Ambulance: South East Coast
- UK Parliament: Horsham

Coneyhurst is a hamlet in the Horsham District of West Sussex, England. It lies on the A272 road 1.6 miles (2.5 km) southeast of Billingshurst. It is named from the Old English words "coni" (meaning "rabbit") and "hyrst" (meaning wooded slope or hillside).
