= Colworth, West Sussex =

Hamlet in West Sussex, England

Coordinates: 50.81771°N 0.70428°W

Colworth
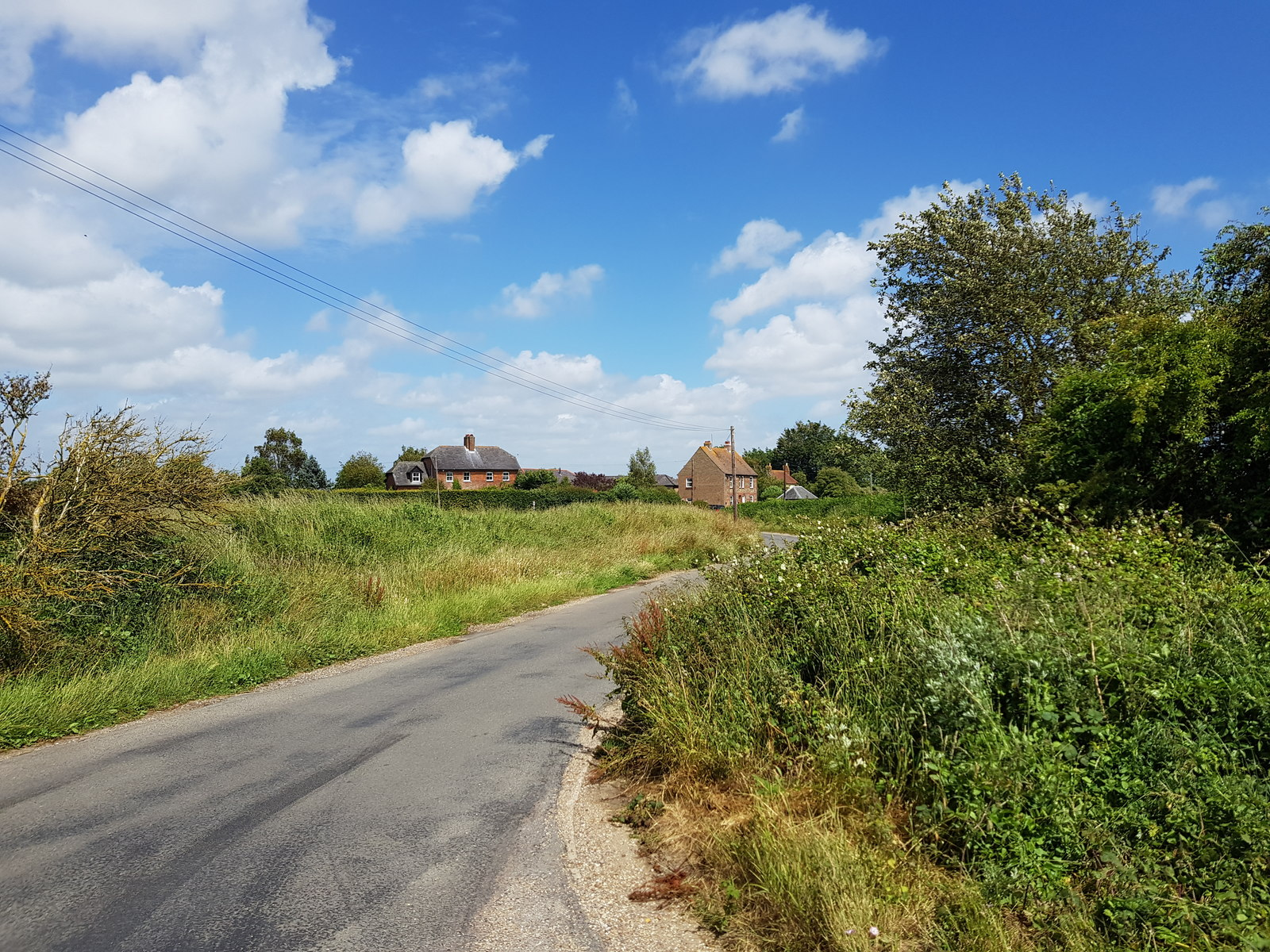
- Towards Colworth Farm

- Location within West Sussex
- OS grid reference: SU913028
- Civil parish: Oving
- District: Chichester
- Shire county: West Sussex
- Region: South East
- Country: England
- Sovereign state: United Kingdom
- Post town: Chichester
- Postcode district: PO20
- Police: Sussex
- Fire: West Sussex
- Ambulance: South East Coast
- UK Parliament: Chichester

Colworth is a hamlet in the Chichester district of West Sussex, England. It lies just off the A259 road 2.7 mile (4.4 km) north of Bognor Regis. At the 2011 census the population of the hamlet was included in the civil parish of Oving.

== History ==
In 988 AD King Æthelred the Unready granted four hides at Colworth to his minister Leofstan, with leave to bequeath it to whom he would. A chapel at Colworth is referred to in Sussex county records in 1510. The disused Portsmouth and Arundel Canal, which was abandoned in 1855, passes through the hamlet.
