= Climping =

Village and parish in West Sussex, England

Coordinates: 50.8134°N 0.5785°W

Climping (Clymping)
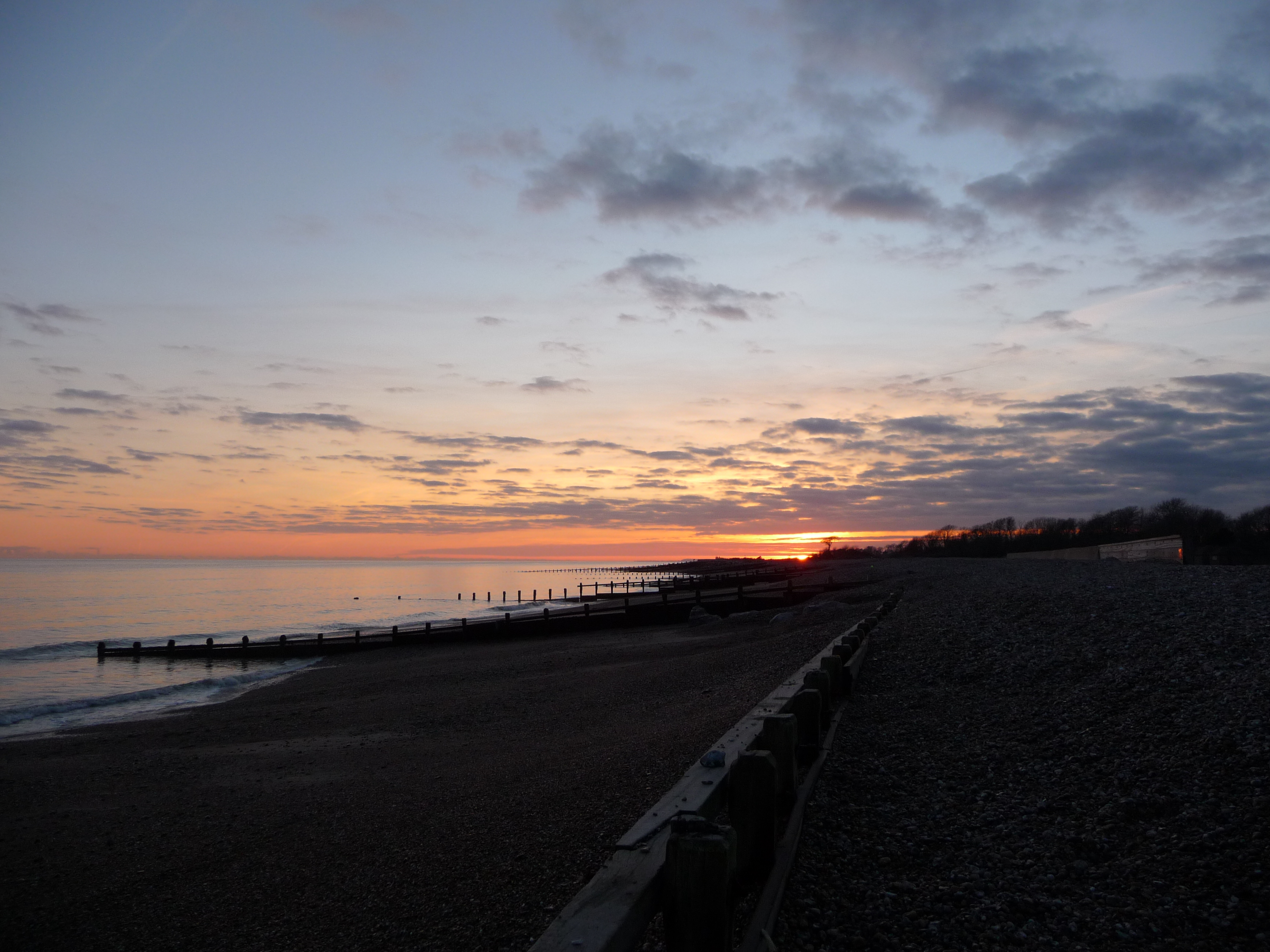
- Climping beach at sunset

- Location within West Sussex
- Area: 6.35 km^{2} (2.45 sq mi)
- Population: 771 (Civil Parish 2011)
  - Density: 121/km^{2} (310/sq mi)
- OS grid reference: TQ0002
  - London: 52 miles (84 km) NNE
- Civil parish: Climping
- District: Arun
- Shire county: West Sussex
- Region: South East
- Country: England
- Sovereign state: United Kingdom
- Post town: LITTLEHAMPTON
- Postcode district: BN17
- Dialling code: 01903
- Police: Sussex
- Fire: West Sussex
- Ambulance: South East Coast
- UK Parliament: Bognor Regis and Littlehampton
- Website: http://www.clymping.org.uk/

Climping (also spelt as Clymping) is a village and civil parish containing agricultural and natural sandy land in the Arun District of West Sussex, England. The parish also contains the coastal hamlet of Atherington. It is three miles (5 km) west of Littlehampton, just north of the A259 road.

== Amenities ==
The parish church, dedicated to St Mary, dates from 1080, and is teamed with those of Yapton and Ford under one vicar. There is a canonical sundial, dating from the 12th century, on the south wall.

Climping village hall was designed in 1930s by architect Herbert Collins.

Fringing the coast towards the River Arun and Littlehampton are the Climping sand dunes, a Site of Special Scientific Interest, which includes areas of rare vegetated shingle.

A windmill here predates the mid-18th century and survives, unused for wind power, bereft of its sails but kept up and lived in.

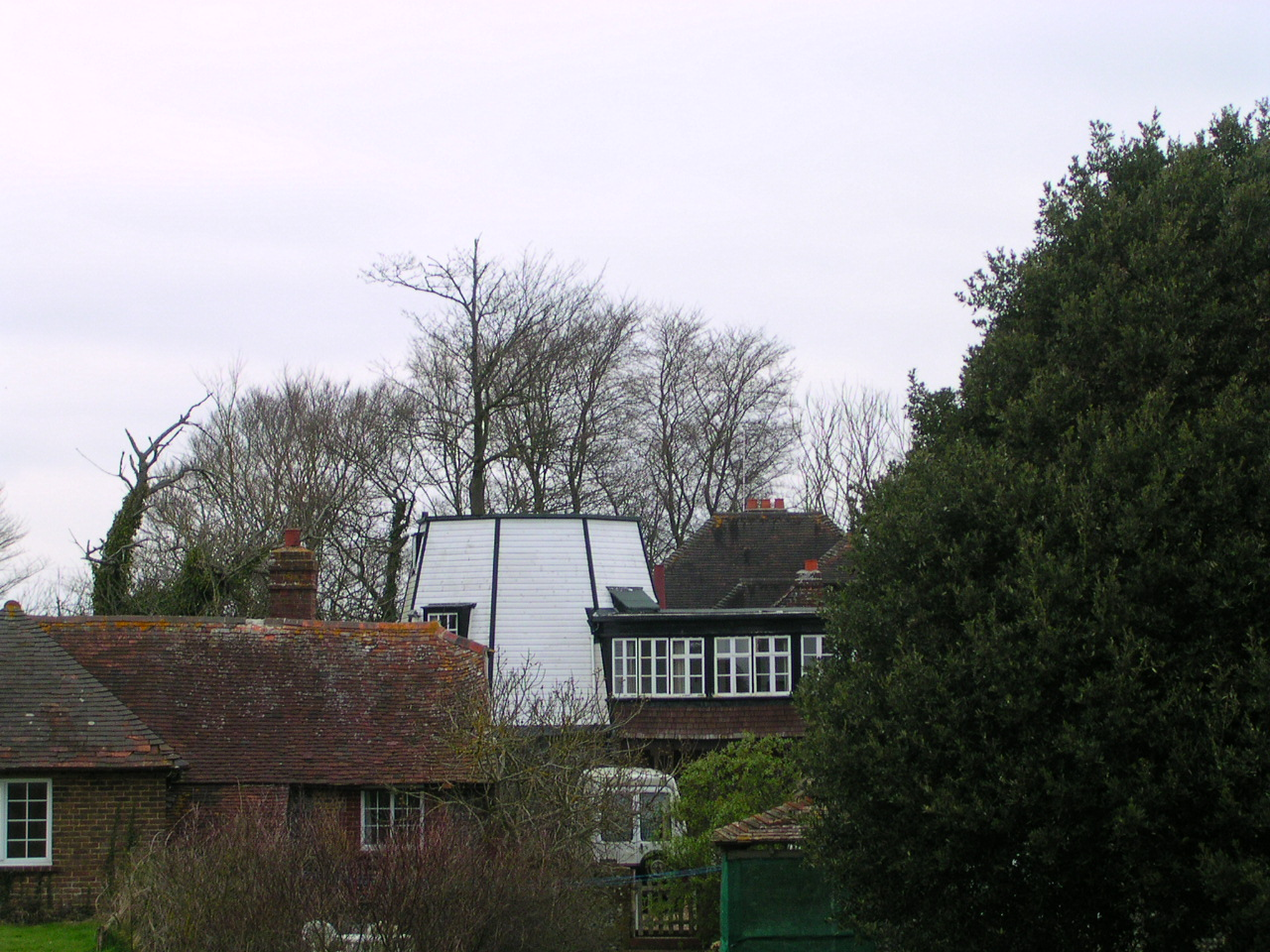
Climping Windmill

== Atherington ==
Some time after 1102 Séez Abbey in Normandy established a cell or grange at Atherington for a monk to act as bailiff of the abbey's lands near Littlehampton. The bailiff was occasionally referred to as a prior and the grange as Atherington Priory. At the suppression of alien houses in around 1415 by Henry V, the confiscated monastic properties of Atherington were given to Syon Abbey in London. The site, also known as Bailiffscourt, retains the 13th-century chapel, now used as a sanctuary for the ashes of the Moynes family. There are also still traces of a moat. (The other buildings on the site are not genuinely medieval).

== Sport and leisure ==
Clymping Cricket Club play at the playing field behind the village hall. The club's First XI play in the West Sussex Invitational Cricket League, Division 3, and the Second XI play in Division 10 (West). The club has over 35 registered players.

As of the 2017–18 season, Climping will no longer have a football club, as the club has moved to Littlehampton.
