= Annington, West Sussex =

Hamlet in West Sussex, England

Coordinates: 50.87625°N 0.31924°W

Annington
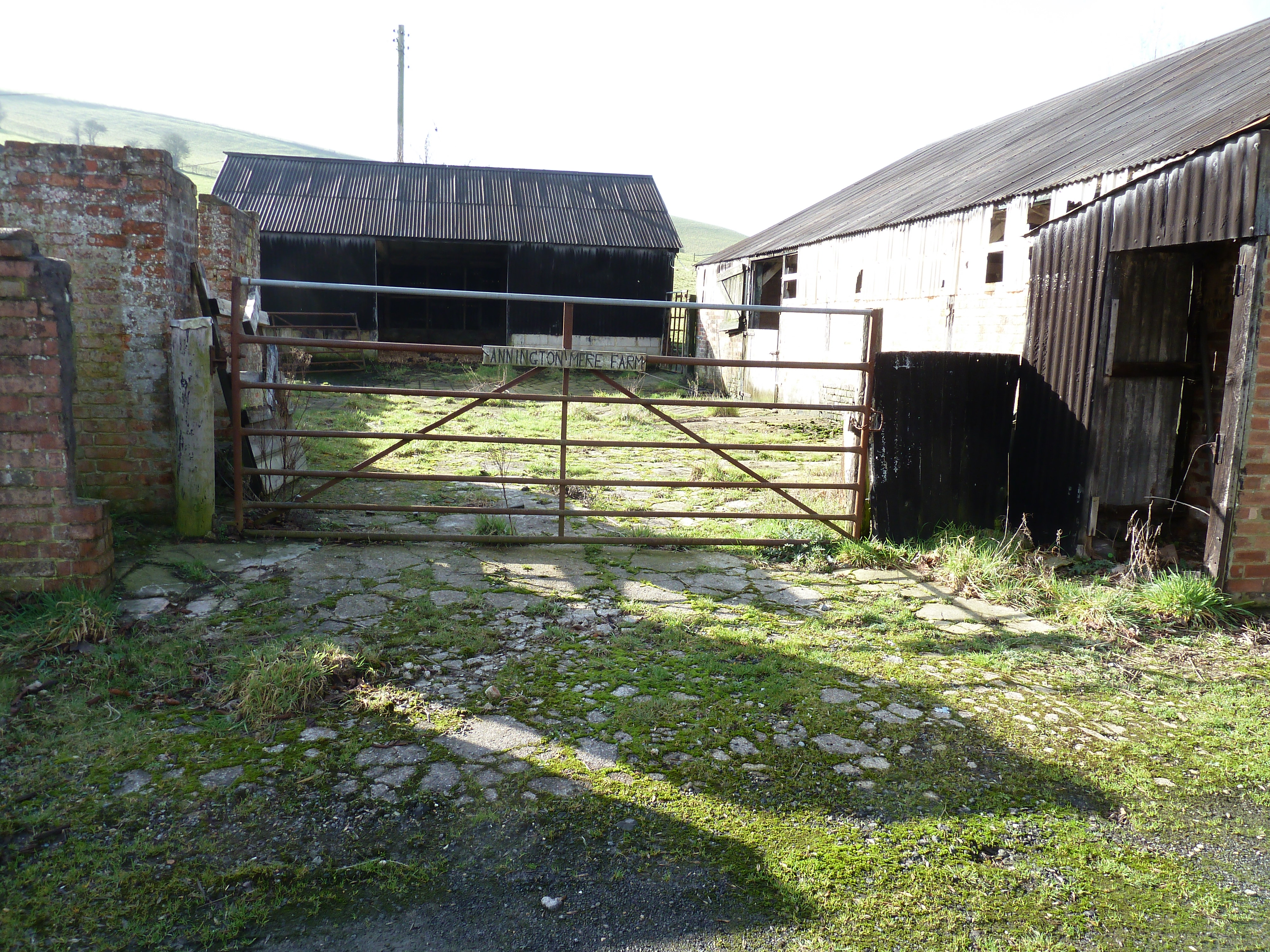
- Farmyard at Annington Mere Farm

- Location within West Sussex
- OS grid reference: TQ183098
- Civil parish: Bramber
- District: Horsham
- Shire county: West Sussex
- Region: South East
- Country: England
- Sovereign state: United Kingdom
- Police: Sussex
- Fire: West Sussex
- Ambulance: South East Coast
- UK Parliament: Arundel and South Downs

Annington is a hamlet in the civil parish of Bramber, in the Horsham district of West Sussex, England. It lies on the Steyning to Botolphs road 0.9 miles (1.5km) south of Steyning. The manor of Annington was once held by the Levett family, and then by their descendants the Eversfields, who sold to the Gorings. Annington was recorded in the Domesday Book as Haningedune.
