= Goddards Green, West Sussex =

Village in West Sussex, England

Coordinates: 50.96604°N 0.1719°W

Goddards Green
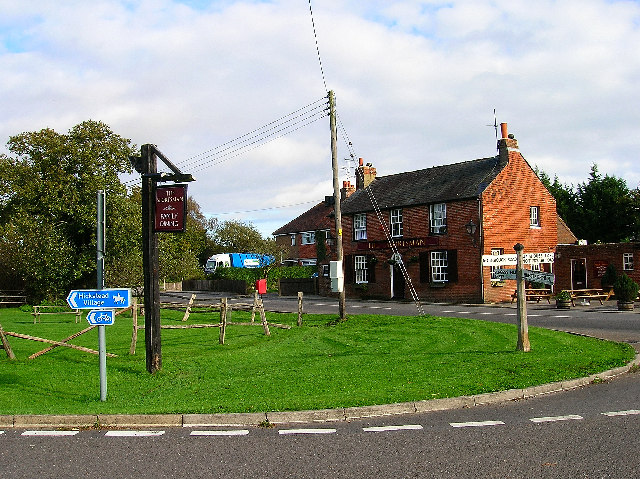
- Goddards Green showing the Sportsman pub

- Location within West Sussex
- OS grid reference: TQ284201
- Civil parish: Hurstpierpoint and Sayers Common
- District: Mid Sussex
- Shire county: West Sussex
- Region: South East
- Country: England
- Sovereign state: United Kingdom
- Post town: HASSOCKS
- Postcode district: BN6
- Dialling code: 01444
- Police: Sussex
- Fire: West Sussex
- Ambulance: South East Coast
- UK Parliament: Arundel and South Downs

Goddards Green (Goddards' Green on Ordnance Survey maps) is a hamlet in the Mid Sussex District of West Sussex, England. It is in the civil parish of Hurstpierpoint and Sayers Common, and lies just off the A2300 road 1.7 miles (2.8 km) west of Burgess Hill.

The hamlet consists of the Sportsman Inn, a few cottages, a water treatment works, a sawmill and a timber depot. The hamlet has become considerably quieter since the building of the A2300 as the roads through the hamlet were used by traffic taking shortcuts from the A23 to Burgess Hill. Today only the north–south Cuckfield–Hurstpierpoint road is operational.

== Etymology ==
The root god may link the name to the town of Godstone in Surrey, with which it was connected via one of the old Roman roads. It may also suggest an association with the Goths, though this is uncertain. The town appears to have been part of a Roman or Sub-Roman network that included Godstone and Ditchling.

== Surrounding area ==
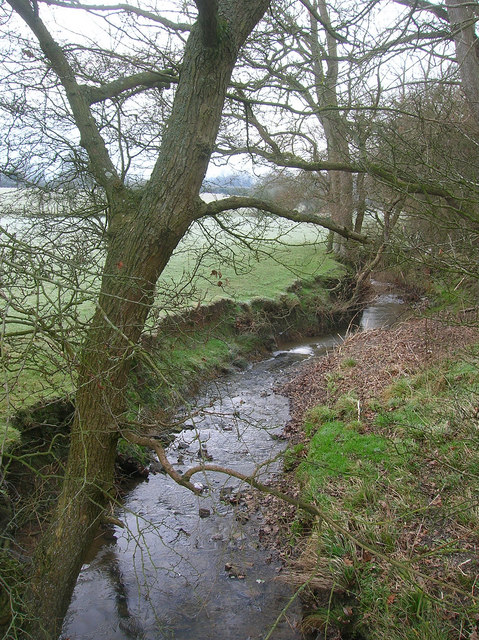
Pook Bourne

The area around Goddard's Green is extremely rich in biodiversity, ancient woodlands and clean streams. At the very north of the parish is Pond Lye which is a little lake that in the 1970s was earmarked to become a Site of Special Scientific Interest, but it never did. The Pook Bourne is a special, biodiverse stream and the area. Just north of the Bourne (TQ 274 200) is a fragment of old meadow, with a colourful tapestry of flowers, including Pepper Saxifrage and Sneezewort. Just west of the Burgess Hill Ring Road are several derelict fields, some in Council ownership. With management they could become places with rich biodiversity but they look set to succeed to scrub thickets. The verges of Malthouse Lane as it turns east to join the Ring Road (TQ 292 193) were rich in archaic flowers at the turn of the century, but by 2012 the encroaching scrub had left only the Water Dock, Betony and Saw Wort surviving. The lack management only increases the risk that the area will be developed.

All the area south of Goddard's Green was threatened by a proposal for a massive new settlement of over 3000 homes. Local people had fought it off by 2017, but the area is still under pressure from developers. Campaigners are working hard against the 'Northern Arc' development around the countryside north of the Burgess Hill Link. Many recognise that the current hyper-development pressures might spreading to fill the whole gap between A23 and Burgess Hill ultimately destroy the ancient woodlands and the rich biodiversity around the Pook Bourne and the ancient woods around Goddard's Green.

=== Pook Bourne ===
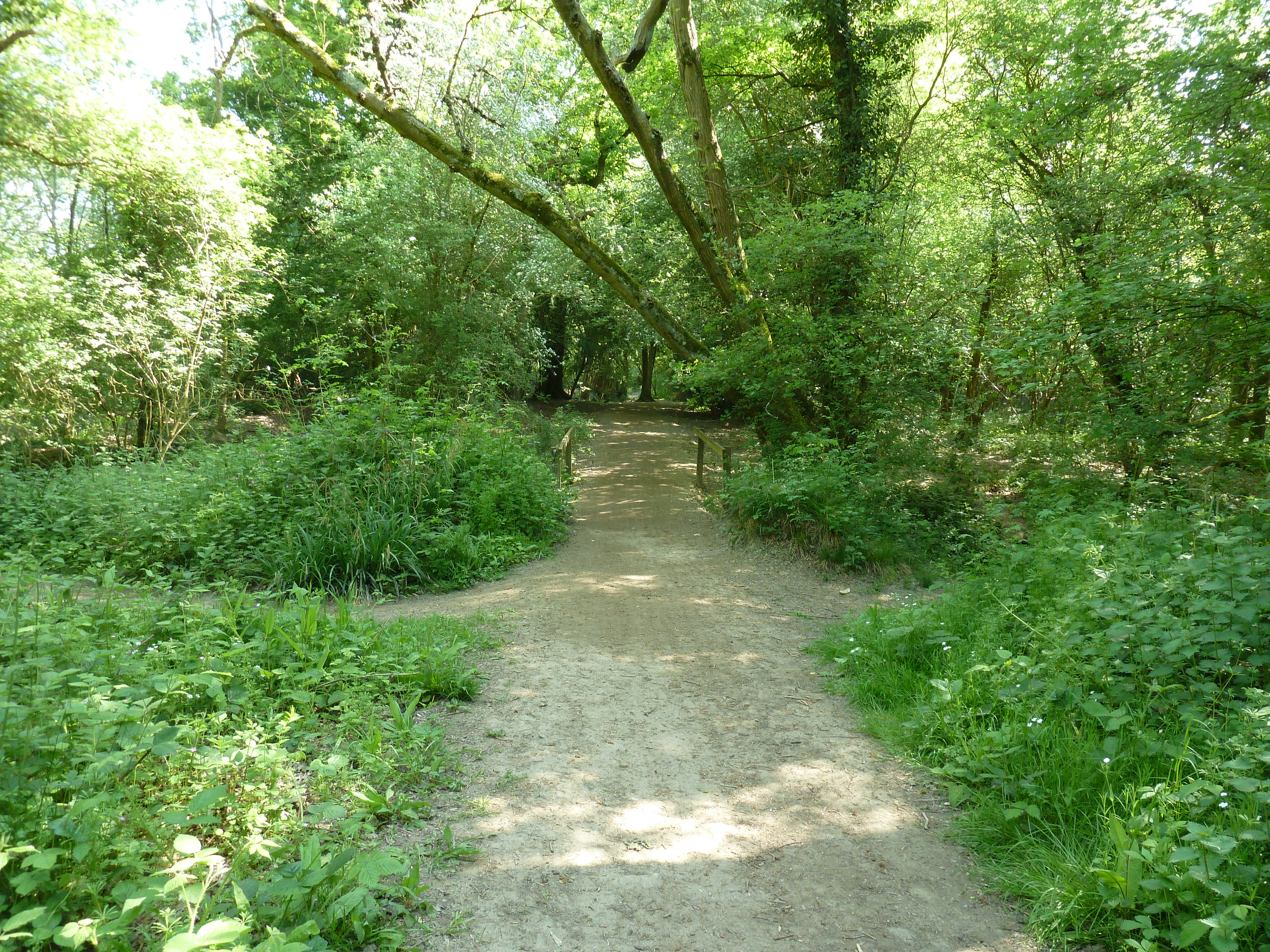
Bridleway bridge in Parson's Withes

West of Burgess Hill the Pook Bourne (Saxon for 'Goblin Stream') e.g. (TQ 275 199), makes a shallow meandering valley between small ancient woods. is a unifying feature and strongly influences the character of the area resulting in an enclosed localised valley setting. It would be the best of our English countryside, if it was not for the noise of the London Road and the Burgess Hill Link Road.

The lush brook meadows have escaped 'improvement' in some spots. There is Gipsywort and Corn mint, Spearwort and Reed Canary Grass. On a bank on the south side (TQ274 199) stands the best Wild Service Tree in Hurstpierpoint parish, with Pepper Saxifrage in the turf. A shallow pond has Spike rush (and unfortunately invasive Himalayan balsam). Wild Hop clambers all over the bushes by Pook Bourne Bridge (TQ 273 198). It is possible that archaeological remains may be present within the area. There is a designated Heritage Asset in the form of a Grade II listed barn, of mid to late 18th century date, is located at North End Farm. Until 2012, the old Pookbourne Barn still stood (TQ 273 199) sheltering its roosting barn owl.

=== Woods ===
There are a number of ancient woods in the area. Great Wood (TQ 281 198) is a bluebell wood, with springtime carpets of Hyacinthoides non-scripta, the 'common bluebell'. These, along with wood anemone (Anemonoides nemorosa), grow under a coppice-with-standards tree-cover. On the south side of the Pook Bourne is the part-ancient, part-plantation Blackhouse Wood (TQ279 198). The secondary part has a ground cover of dog's mercury and the ancient part has bluebells and wood anemones. South of Shalford (TQ 284 197) are two more little ancient woods, Hungerfields Wood, in the crook of Northends Lane (TQ 280 191) and Northend Copse (TQ 285 181), a bluebell wood under oak and hazel, with at least one wild service tree. To the east, Parson's Withes (TQ 292 197), in the angle between Gatehouse and Pangdean Lanes, has varied flora and much thorn, both Midland hawthorn and common hawthorn and their hybrids. The landowner allowed the public to use the woods for recreation until 2021, since when "Private: Keep out" notices have been put up. Locals have suggested this is so the land can ultimately be sold to developers with less protests from a concerned public.
