= Heath Common =

Village in West Sussex, England

Coordinates: 50.9249°N 0.42203°W

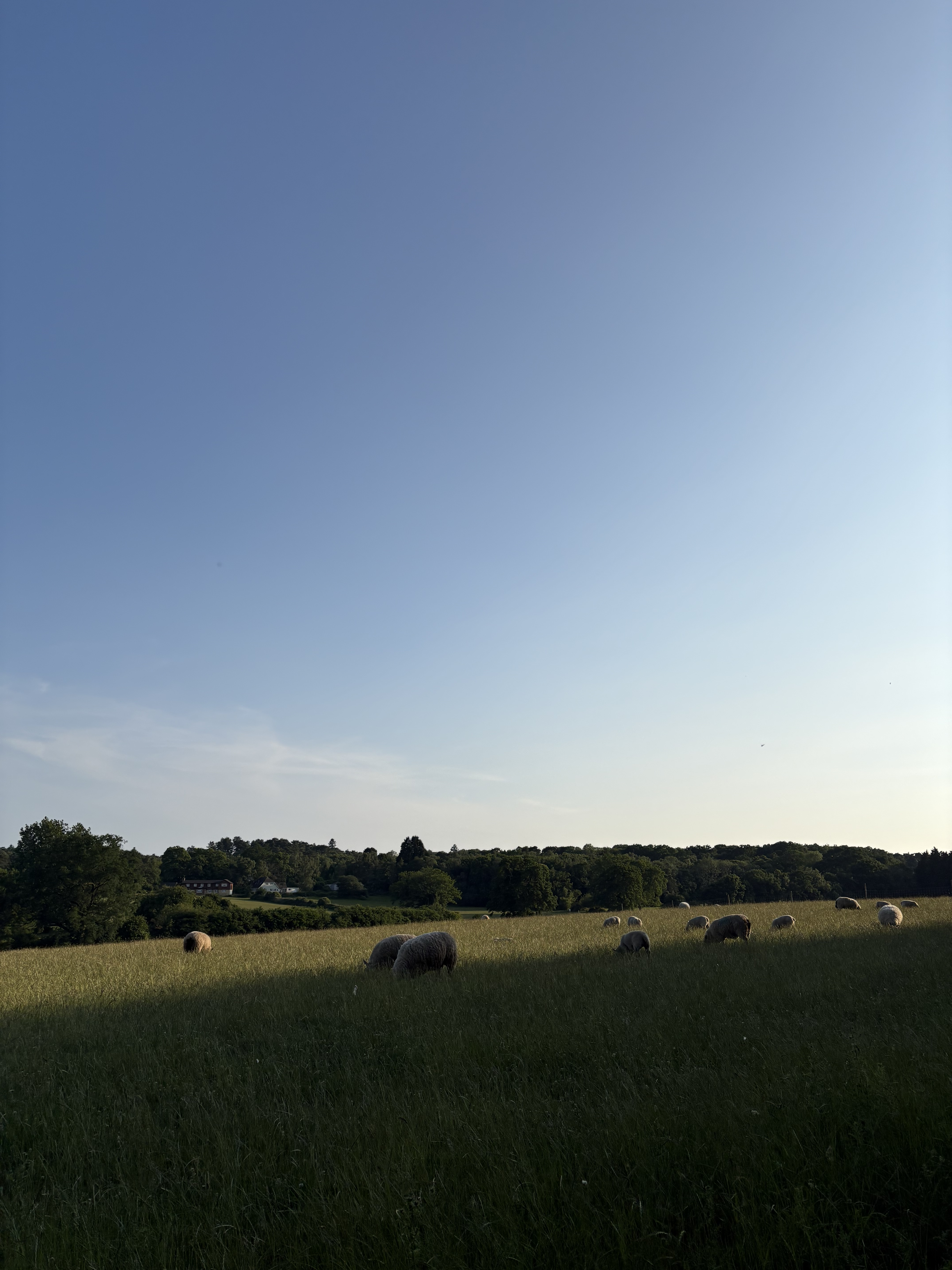
- Heath Common in the Summer. Newhouse Lane sits behind the treeline

- Location within West Sussex
- OS grid reference: TQ110151
- Civil parish: Washington
- District: Horsham
- Shire county: West Sussex
- Region: South East
- Country: England
- Sovereign state: United Kingdom
- Police: Sussex
- Fire: West Sussex
- Ambulance: South East Coast
- UK Parliament: Arundel and South Downs

Heath Common is a settlement in the civil parish of Washington, in the Horsham district of West Sussex, England. It lies on the Storrington to Ashington road 1.5 miles (2.4 km) east of Storrington, and 0.5 miles west of the A24. Development began in the 1920s, when 50 acres of land was purchased by Vera Pragnell, to be used for a utopian commune known as the Sanctuary.

At the core of Heath Common lies an area of narrow and interlinked roads, known locally as 'The Lanes'. Hampers Lane serves as the main road through which The Lanes branch off - with the majority leading to detached houses. Vera's Walk - named after Vera Pragnell - is one of these lanes. Pragnell's life in Heath Common remains one of the most historically significant aspects to the area. In 1923 Pragnell established a commune called The Sanctuary, spanning across 19 of the 50 acres of land she owned, for which community and environmental living were central tenets. After World War Two, The Sanctuary was also home to Kenyan independence figure - and later prime minister of Kenya - Jomo Kenyatta.
