= Merston =

Village and parish in West Sussex, England

Coordinates: 50.8180°N 0.7308°W

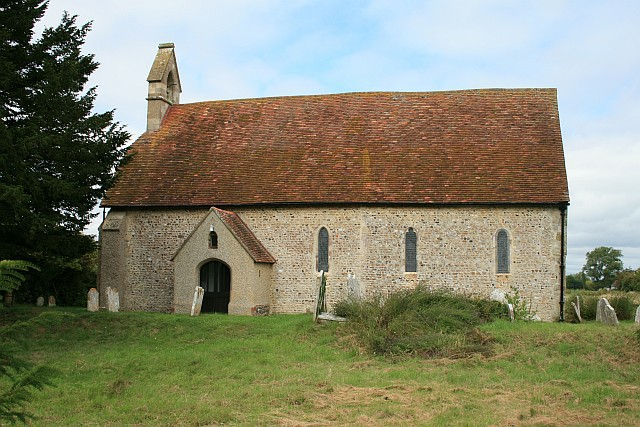
- St Giles’ Church

- Location within West Sussex
- OS grid reference: SU895028
- Civil parish: Oving
- District: Chichester
- Shire county: West Sussex
- Region: South East
- Country: England
- Sovereign state: United Kingdom
- Post town: Chichester
- Postcode district: PO20
- Police: Sussex
- Fire: West Sussex
- Ambulance: South East Coast
- UK Parliament: Chichester

Merston is a small village, an Anglican parish and former civil parish, now in the civil parish of Oving, in the Chichester district of West Sussex, England. It lies just south of the A259 road 2.4 miles (3.9 km) southeast of Chichester.

== History ==
Merston was listed in the Domesday Book (1086) in the ancient hundred of Boxgrove as having 16 households, meadows, plough land, and three mills. The tenant in chief was Earl Roger of Shrewsbury.

In 1861, Merston Anglican parish's population was 79, and the parish was 710 acres (290 ha).

In 1931 the parish had a population of 85. On 1 April 1933 the civil parish was abolished and merged with Oving.

== Parish church ==
The 13th-century St Giles church is a Grade I listed building. The font is 12th-century. The parish is now in the parish of North Mundham with Merston in the Diocese of Chichester, and St Giles is closed for services. The church's original registers are held by West Sussex Record Office in Chichester. The church is open to visitors.

== RAF Merston ==
Nearby was RAF Merston, a World War II airfield. The airfield was in use from 1939 to 1945.
