= Apuldram =

Village and parish in West Sussex, England

Coordinates: 50.822°N 0.806°W

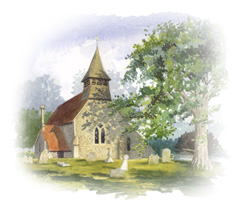
- Apuldram Church

- Location within West Sussex
- Area: 4.34 km^{2} (1.68 sq mi)
- Population: 169 (2011 Census)
  - Density: 39/km^{2} (100/sq mi)
- OS grid reference: SU842031
  - London: 56 miles (90 km) NNE
- Civil parish: Appledram
- District: Chichester
- Shire county: West Sussex
- Region: South East
- Country: England
- Sovereign state: United Kingdom
- Post town: CHICHESTER
- Postcode district: PO20
- Dialling code: 01243
- Police: Sussex
- Fire: West Sussex
- Ambulance: South East Coast
- UK Parliament: Chichester

Apuldram or Appledram locally /ˈæpəldræm/ is a small parish and a village on the northeastern upper reach of Chichester Harbour about two miles (3 km) south-west of the centre of Chichester in West Sussex, England. Access to the harbour is at Dell Quay.

The nearest railway station is 1.2 miles (1.9 km) northeast of the village, at Chichester.

Most of the parish is farmland, roughly bounded to the north by the River Lavant, to the west by the harbour and to the south by Chichester Marina and the Chichester Canal. The parish is crossed by several public footpaths, offering views of the harbour, cathedral and South Downs. There is now no village centre, and of the original medieval village only the church, the manor and Ryman's house now remain.

The area of the parish is 1,073 acres (4.34 km^{2}) and at the 2011 census the population was 169, a reduction of 9% from the 2001 census.

== Toponymy ==
Old records show many different spellings – Apulderham, Apeldreham (1121), Appeltrieham (1198), Appuldram (1440) – but for several centuries the spelling used by the church and the parishioners has been Apuldram. Civic authorities use both 'Appledram' and 'Apuldram' in their records.

W D Peckham is quoted as writing 'the deep loam with a clay or brick-earth subsoil is admirable apple growing land to this day'; a feature common to the parishes of the Manwood peninsula. Inventories commonly list cider and not beer.

Place names within the parish reflect the industries and activities that once flourished. Salterns Copse, near the Marina, takes its name from the salt pans that were located nearby. Built by the Ayles family of Havant in the 18th century they survived until the middle of the 19th century, when the railways brought in the cheaper Cheshire salt. Copperas Point records the production of copperas from iron pyrite.

== Early history ==
In Saxon times, and for a while after the Norman Conquest, the area now forming the Parish of Apuldram was part of the Manor of Bosham, which in the 11th century, during the reign of Edward the Confessor, belonged to Godwin, the powerful Earl of Wessex, whose son Harold was defeated at Hastings. After the Conquest, William I took possession of the Manor.

In 1125 Henry I gave the parish to the Abbot and Brethren of Battle Abbey. However, the College of Bosham remained responsible for ecclesiastical matters and one of the six canons of the college held the Prebend and paid a deputy to live in and care for the parish. At one time the Prebend of Apuldram was held by William of Wykeham, Bishop of Winchester.

In 1197 Battle granted possession to Sir Michael de Appeltrieham, Sheriff of Sussex. The demesne reverted to the Crown following the Dissolution of the Monasteries between 1538 and 1542, and in 1580 Elizabeth I granted it to William, Baron Howard of Effingham. On his death, it passed to his son Charles, who was Lord High Admiral from 1585 to 1618 and commanded the fleet that defeated the Spanish Armada.

== Church of St Mary the Virgin ==
The original church is believed to have been built soon after 1100, but the main building was constructed in its present form in about 1250. The south aisle was added about 100 years later.

The chancel has beautifully proportioned triple lancet windows with Purbeck marble shafts and stone mouldings. The altar stands on Victorian tiles, but those in the first pavement by the rails are medieval. A crusaders' floor slab lies on the south side of the sanctuary. Behind the pulpit is the start of a stone staircase that once led up to a rood loft, but this has long since been removed, together with the rest of the staircase.

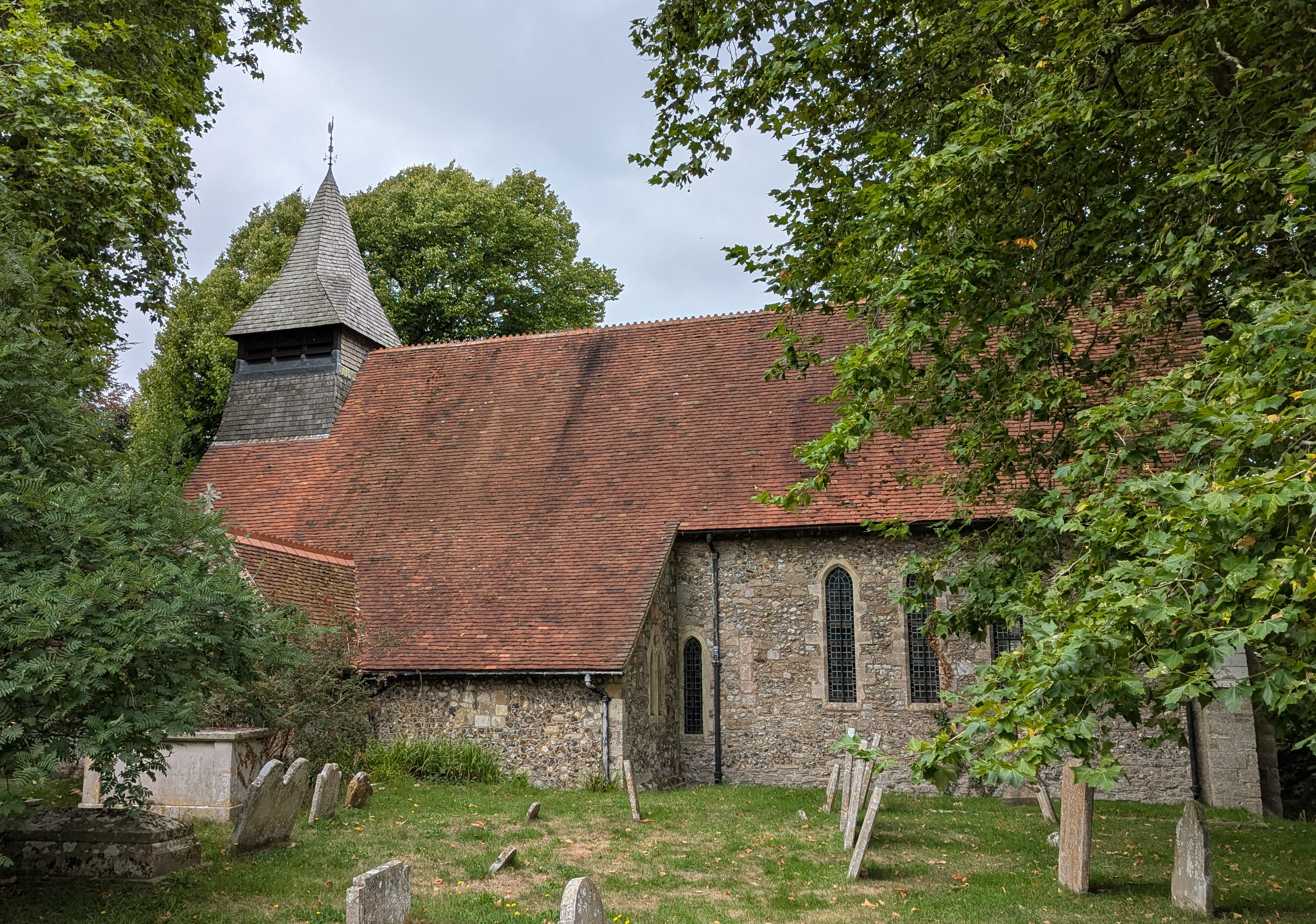
The parish church of St Mary at Apuldram, West Sussex, England. August 2025.

The Purbeck marble font is 12th century. The circular basin is lined and set in a square slab standing on five shafts. The central shaft is original, but the others are later replacements. The font shows signs of ill treatment, probably during the Cromwellian era.

== Landmarks ==
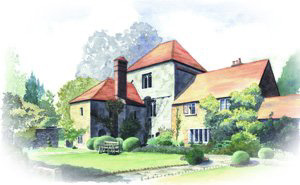
Ryman's

Ryman's is a Grade I listed building. At the end of the 12th century Sir Michael de Appeltrieham owned several hundred acres of the parish, including the site of this property. The earliest recorded house on the site was built for Chauns in the 13th century, and at the beginning of the 15th century William Ryman added the three-storey tower and the south wing shown in the picture. Despite many later alterations, including some by the architect Walter Godfrey in the 1930s, William Ryman's house was probably much the same size as it is today. Ryman was a prominent lawyer and his son, Sir William Ryman, was Sheriff of Sussex. The Ryman family held the estate for nearly two centuries until it was bought in 1619 by William Smyth of Binderton. After a suit in Chancery it was divided in 1730 between the two daughters of George Smyth. Ryman's and some 300 acres (120 ha) went to Barbara, wife of the Rev William Barttelot. Apuldram Manor and the same amount of land went to Mary, see below.

The Manor House is Grade II listed. The north face of this early 17th-century house has a Dutch gable, rare in this part of the county. Soon after its construction it was bought by William Smyth. It passed via his great-granddaughter Mary to her husband William Hamilton and stayed in that family for a century and a half.

== Dell Quay ==
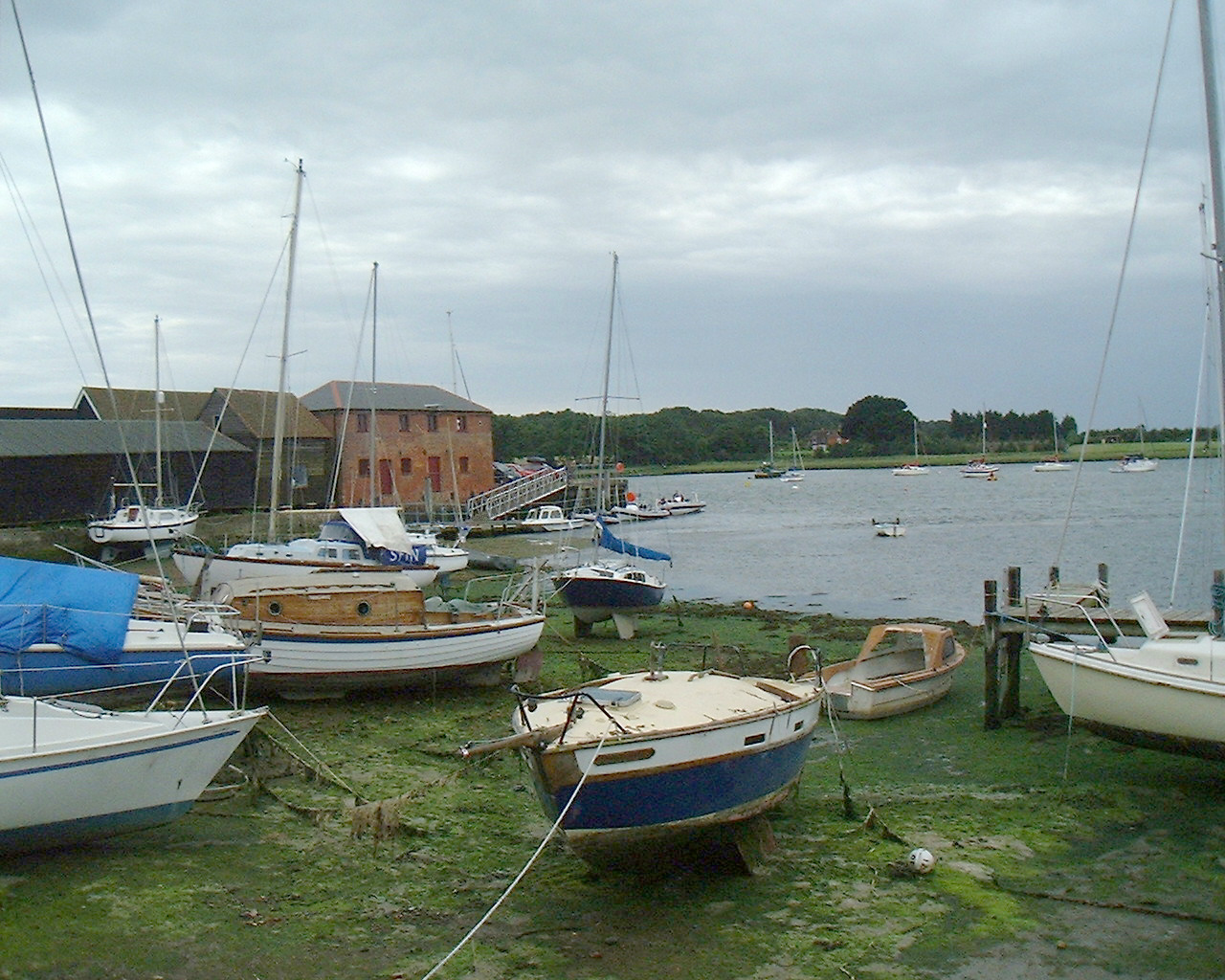
The Fishbourne Reach of Chichester Harbour, Dell Quay

In Roman times the harbour was navigable all the way to Fishbourne, and Roman galleys may have sailed right up to the Fishbourne Palace. Sea levels in the harbour were lower in the Middle Ages than they are now, and there are records of losses of land to the sea by erosion. The Great Flood of Apuldram occurred in 1274, causing enormous damage in the harbour, following which additional sea walls and sluices were installed. The former existence of a tide mill on the River Lavant near Apuldram Common is an indication of the level of the sea at that time at the northern boundary of the parish.

The landing place was moved down channel owing to silting of the upper reaches, and for a time there was access to the harbour a little to the south of the mouth of the Lavant. Here there was a sunken channel, now dry, which led to the centre of the medieval Apuldram village. There is also evidence of a landing place at La Delle. A rent list, dated 1432, records a villein whose duties included "to cart from La Delle to Chichester". Exports in the 14th and 15th centuries were mainly wool and cloth.

The wharf at Dell Quay was built in the 16th century on the orders of Lord Fitzwilliam of Cowdray, Lord High Admiral from 1536 to 1540 and in 1580 it was written that the wharf had been "longe sythens buylded by the Lord Fitzwilliam". The quay was at that time was one of the official landing place for the Port of Chichester (including also Sidelesham and the Witterings), which in the 14th century was rated the 7th in importance in all England.

At that time there were no warehouses at Dell Quay and no inn. The citizens of Chichester gave this as a reason for asking permission to dig a canal from the quay to the town. Permission was granted but with a condition that the canal must not cut through lands belonging to 'the Baron' (Howard of Effingham), and this made the scheme impractical. Instead, the picturesque Crown & Anchor Inn was built at the end of the 16th century and seems to have been called initially 'Dell Key House' (not to be confused with the present Dell Quay House, which incorporates William Tipper's post mill built in the eighteenth century, the subject of paintings by Richard Nibbs and George Lambert).

During the 17th century the channel needed constant attention. Ships offloading ballast as they approached the quay added to the problem. However, after an intensive programme of dredging, ships of 40 tons could in 1685 once again dock at the quay. In the 18th century coal from Newcastle became the major import and the outlook was graced by three large coal pounds – on the quay, by the inn and on the site of what is now Quay Cottage. There was a crane, which in 1789 was said to be "much out of repair, useless and obstructive". The amount of goods delivered varied over the years. 2128 tons in 1786, 4085 in 1793, 2771 in 1800, 3043 in 1807 and 3602 in 1813. By 1908 there was a steam-driven crane, running on rails, which was later replaced by a diesel-powered crane.

A gale in August 1925 wreaked havoc with moored boats. Owners struggling to refloat their craft realised that co-operation would ease the task, which led to the formation of the Dell Quay Boat Club. The name was changed to the Dell Quay Sailing Club in 1934. Also located on the quay are the Apuldram Fishing and Boat Club and a classroom for the Chichester Harbour Education Centre.

The water at Dell Quay is now normally only navigable for dinghies and small cabin cruisers for a few hours either side of high tide. However, the tall ship Phoenix visited twice during the second half of the 20th century and tied up on the end of the quay.

== Music ==
A music festival called Blues on the Farm has been held in the village at Pump Bottom Farm since 1991.
