= New Lipchis Way =

38-mile footpath in southern England

- Length: 60.8 km (37.8 mi)
- Location: Hampshire and West Sussex, England
- Trailheads: Liphook – West Wittering
- Use: Hiking
- Season: All year

The New Lipchis Way is a 60.8 kilometres (37.8 mi) long distance footpath which runs from Liphook in Hampshire to West Wittering in West Sussex. Running north–south across the Western Weald and South Downs to the Sussex coastal plain and Chichester Harbour the path crosses several geological rock strata and their associated soils and habitats. Landmarks on the route include Cowdray ruins, Goodwood Racecourse, the Trundle, Chichester Cathedral and the city walls, and East Head at West Wittering.

== The route ==
From the northern end, the trail leaves Liphook by Midhurst Road, joining the Sussex Border Path in an easterly direction at Highfield Lane and following it to Stanley Common before turning south past Iron Hill to Elmers Marsh and Upper North Park Farm, then to Woolbeding Common, where there are fine views westward. From this sandstone ridge the trail descends to cross the River Rother for the first time at Iping Bridge, then follows a bridleway east to another ancient stone bridge at Stedham where it re-crosses to the north bank of the river. Following a northerly loop of the river past Stedham Hall and Stedham Mill the trail crosses the Rother for the third time at Woolbeding Bridge. From here the trail soon reaches the A272 road on the western outskirts of Midhurst, turning onto June Lane, then a footpath to reach the secondary school site and the bus station at North Street car park.

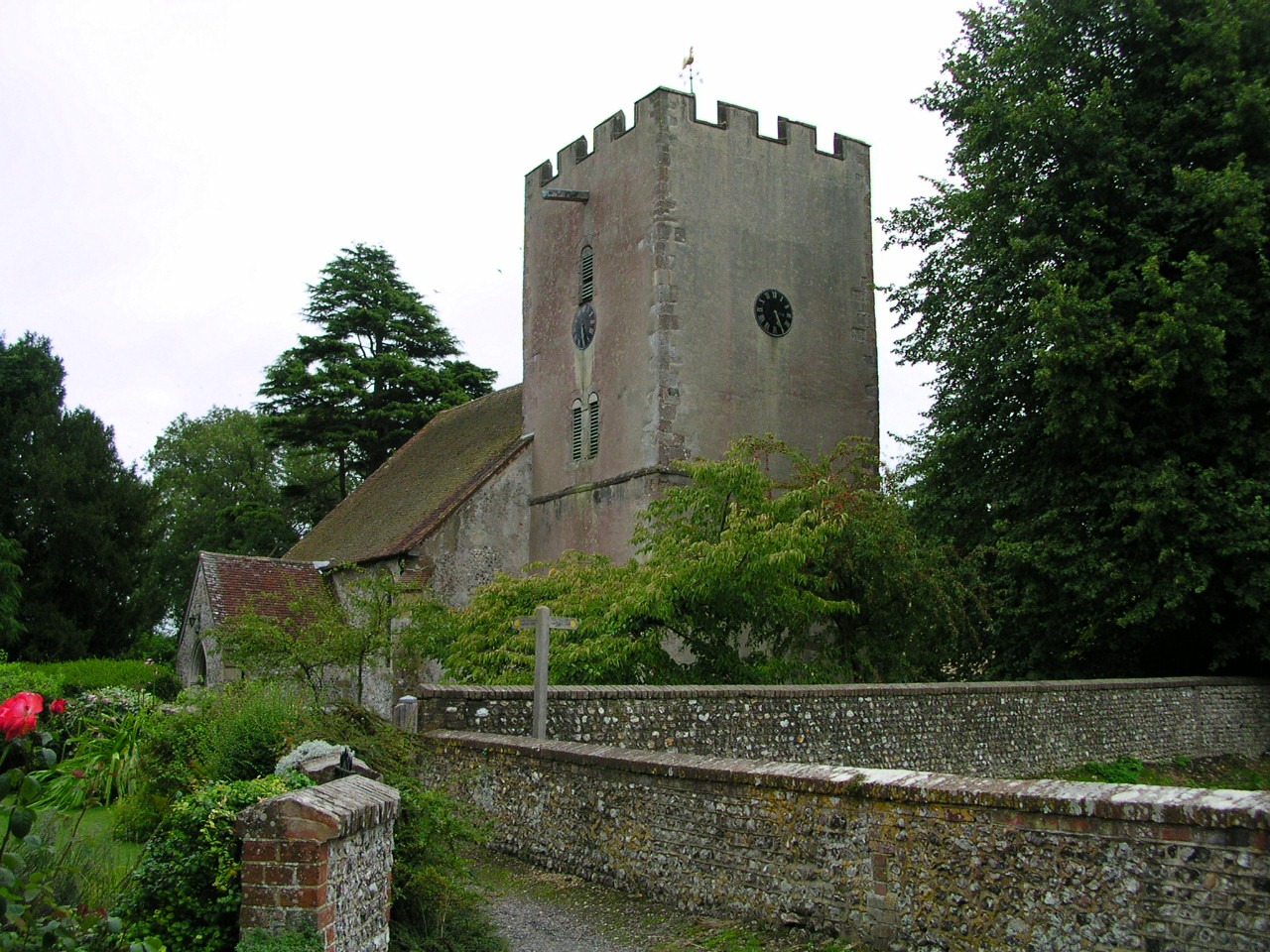
Church of the Blessed Virgin Mary, Singleton

From the car park the trail takes the causeway across the Rother floodplain towards the Tudor ruins of Cowdray House, but turns right on reaching the river to skirt round St Anne's Hill, once the site of a Norman castle, and crosses a bridge at the former Midhurst canal wharf, once the western terminus of the Rother Navigation. Passing the former wharfinger's cottage the trail follows the south bank of the river before turning south across country to the small village of Heyshott, birthplace of reformer and peace campaigner Richard Cobden who is buried in nearby West Lavington churchyard. Passing the ancient parish church of St James before leaving the public highway the trail then climbs the steep South Downs escarpment to the trail's highest point on Heyshott Down at 225 metres (738 ft) where it crosses the South Downs Way. The trail now descends the gentler slopes through Singleton Forest and then crosses open ground at Levin Down to Singleton on the River Lavant. In this largely flint built village the Saxon parish church with its massive squat tower was a hundredal church. A doorway from the tower into the nave shows that there was once an upper floor to the nave.

From Singleton a footpath heads south across the fields towards Goodwood Racecourse and Goodwood Country Park, to join the lane coming up from Charlton towards a triangular road junction, from which the trail climbs St Roche's Hill to the Trundle Iron Age hill fort, used as a base by clubmen during the English Civil War. Here there are panoramic views of the coastal plain from Chichester to the Solent and the Isle of Wight. The trail now briefly joins the Monarch's Way footpath westward before continuing across open ground at Haye's Down to join the Centurion Way path, a footpath and cycle route which follows the track bed of the former Chichester to Midhurst railway and takes its name from the Chichester to Silchester Roman road, which it crosses at East Broyle Copse. After passing through Mid Lavant the trail crosses an Iron Age linear embankment, the Devils Ditch, and another at West Broyle Copse. Centurion Way leads to the west side of Chichester where the New Lipchis Way joins the South Coast Cycle Route to the city's west gate.

The trail leaves Chichester southward from the canal basin, south of the railway station, following the Chichester Canal. This former ship canal runs south to Hunston, then turns sharply west where it joins the former Portsmouth and Arundel Canal, then continues past Donnington to Chichester Harbour. Crossing the canal at Salterns Lock the trail follows footpaths to West Itchenor and continues along the harbour coast to East Head, doubling back to end at West Wittering.

== Origin of the name ==
The original trail, created in 1985, was between Liphook and Chichester, with the name being an amalgam of the two. The extension to the coast was instigated by Footprints of Sussex who waymarked the complete trail with plastic discs and produced a trail guide. It was opened in August 2008 by Louise Goldsmith of West Sussex County Council and renamed "New Lipchis Way".

== Way markers ==
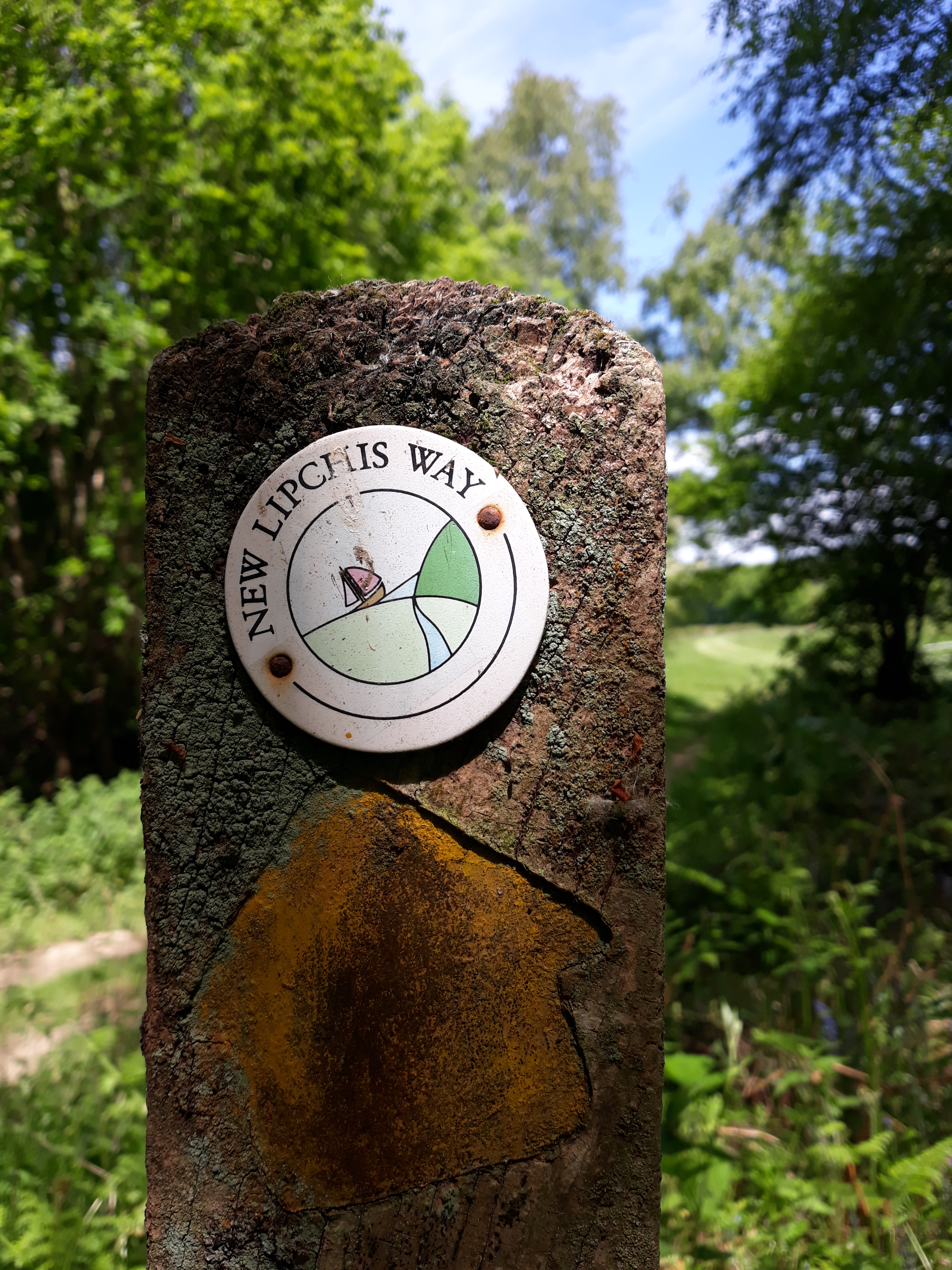

The trail is waymarked with named white plastic discs showing a sailing boat on the sea beyond downland hills and a river. The discs were designed by Footprints of Sussex in conjunction with West Sussex County Council design team.
