= A286 road =

Road in the south east of England

A286

Route information
- Length: 32 mi (51 km)

Major junctions
- North end: Milford, Surrey
- A283 A287 A272 A259; A27
- South end: Birdham, south of Chichester

Location
- Country: United Kingdom
- Primary destinations: Milford, Surrey; Haslemere; Midhurst; Chichester

Road network
- Roads in the United Kingdom; Motorways; A and B road zones

The A286 is an A class road in the south of England, from its northernmost point in Milford, Surrey, to Birdham, West Sussex. It passes through the market towns of Haslemere and Midhurst, and the cathedral city of Chichester. The road is mostly single carriageway, with a small dual carriageway section as part of the Chichester ring road.

The road is 32 miles (51 km) long and follows a predominantly rural route through common land, farmland, woodland and the South Downs.

== Route ==
=== Surrey ===
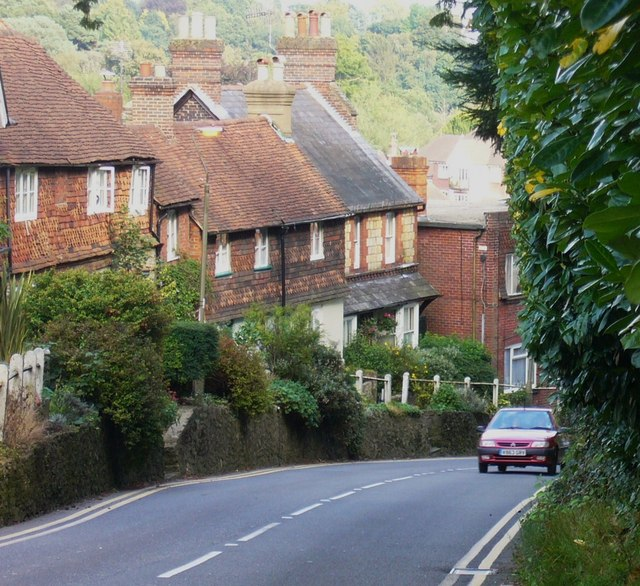
Cottages on Shepherd's Hill, Haslemere

The A286 begins at a junction with the A3100 (the old A3 London to Portsmouth road) in Milford. A few hundred metres south of its origin the A286 crosses the A283 road to Petworth, then crosses Witley Common, a Site of Special Scientific Interest. The route passes Witley Park and through the village centres of Brook and Grayswood before dropping down into Haslemere, passing Haslemere Educational Museum and Haslemere Town Hall, where it crosses the B2131 road leading west to Liphook and east to Petworth. The road rises steeply up Shepherd's Hill and down the other side, skirting the edge of Camelsdale (in the parish of Hammer) where it passes the southern end of the A287 before reaching the boundary with West Sussex.

=== West Sussex ===
Once in West Sussex, the route passes through Kingsley Green, a hamlet between Haslemere and Fernhurst, where the road was widened and straightened in the 1960s. This part of the route was turnpiked in the 18th century and was a toll road until 1864. The road crosses Friday's Hill and drops down through the village of Fernhurst.

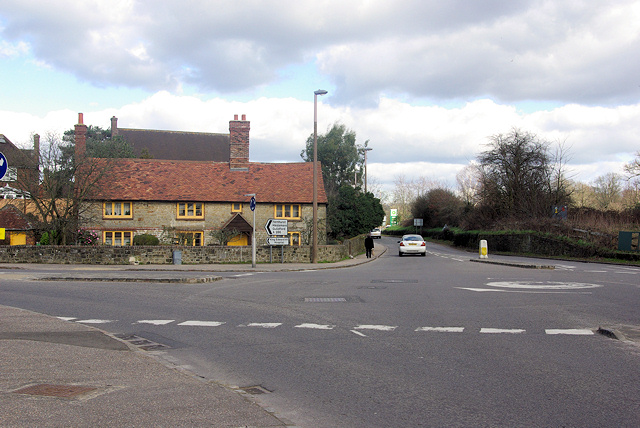
A286/A272 junction at Easebourne

After Fernhurst, the road continues downhill to Cooksbridge, where the road was widened in 1962 and an old bridge dated 1774 removed. It then crosses Henley Common; the road formerly passed through the hamlet of Henley up a narrow, steep lane, which was bypassed by an easier route in 1825. After passing a lane leading to the former Edward VII Hospital the road drops steeply once again until it reaches Easebourne, passing the Budgenor Lodge former workhouse and joining the A272 from the east. At the north end of Midhurst, the road passes the edge of Cowdray Park and the ruins of Cowdray House as it crosses the River Rother. It splits with the A272 to the west in the town centre.

Three miles south of Midhurst the road crosses Cocking Causeway and passes through the village of Cocking. South of Cocking, the road rises steeply and crosses the South Downs Way trail, dropping down again to the village of Singleton, passing the Weald and Downland Open Air Museum. The route becomes less hilly as it reaches the coastal plain, passing through West Dean with West Dean College and Binderton, a hamlet in the Lavant Valley. After a junction with the B2141 road west to Harting and Petersfield, the road passes through Lavant and a mile further on reaches the outskirts of Chichester at Broyle.

At Chichester's Northgate, it is joined by the B2178 from the west, and then passes either side of the city centre, past Chichester railway station, the B2144 road to the east, and the A259 south coast road. Passing through Stockbridge, the southern outskirts of Chichester in the parish of Donnington, the road crosses the A27 Chichester Bypass. It then crosses the Chichester Canal (a few feet above the water, blocking the passage of the canal) and passes Chichester Marina on the eastern edge of Chichester Harbour. After a few more miles it reaches the village of Birdham, where it splits into two B-class roads – the B2179 to West Wittering and the B2198 to Bracklesham Bay.

== Major Junctions ==
County	Location	mi	km	Destinations	Notes
Surrey	Milford	0.0	0.0	A3100 (Portsmouth Road) to B3001 / A3 – Guildford, Farnham, Godalming	northern terminus
Surrey	Milford	0.3	0.48	To A3 (Cherry Tree Roundabout) / B3001 / A3100 / A283 – Guildford, Petersfield, Farnham, Godalming, Petworth, Chiddingfold, Witley	
Surrey	Witley	1.3	2.1	(Gasden Lane) - Witley	
Surrey	Brook	3.3	5.3	(Park Lane / Brook Road) - Bowlhead Green, Sandhills, Chiddingfold	
Surrey	Grayswood	5.5	8.9	(Lower Road) - Hambledon, Chiddingfold	
Surrey	Haslemere	6.9	11.1	B2131 (Petworth Road) to A283 – Petworth	A286 loops back around via High Street
Surrey	Haslemere	7	11	B2131 (Lower Street) – Liphook, Station	
Surrey	Haslemere	7.9	12.7	A287 (Bell Road) – Liphook, Farnham, Hindhead	Not signposted southbound; A287 only appears on northbound signs.
West Sussex	Fernhurst	9.8	15.8	(Hogs Hill) - Lickfold, Lurgashall, Hurstford Ind Est	
West Sussex	Between Fernhurst and Henley	11.3	18.2	Henley	No road name
West Sussex	Easebourne	14.2	22.9	To A272 (Wheelbarrow Castle / Hollist Lane) – Woolbeding, Petworth, Tillington	
West Sussex	Easebourne	14.7	23.7	A272 (Easebourne Lane) – Haywards Heath, Petworth, Tillington	Tillington signposted northbound only
West Sussex	Midhurst	15.2	24.5	A272 (Petersfield Road) – Petersfield	
West Sussex	Midhurst	15.6	25.1	(Bepton Road) - Bepton	
West Sussex	West Lavington	16.6	26.7	(Oaklands Lane) - Dunford, Pendean	
West Sussex	south of Midhurst	17.2	27.7	(Bex Lane) - Heyshott, Graffham, South Ambersham	
West Sussex	Cocking	18.1	29.1	(Bell Lane) - Bepton, Harting	
West Sussex	Singleton	20.9	33.6	(Charlton Road) - Charlton, East Dean	
West Sussex	Mid Lavant	24.9	40.1	(W Stoke Road) - East Ashling, Funtington	
West Sussex	Mid Lavant	25	40	(Sheepwash Lane) - East Lavant	
West Sussex	Mid Lavant	25.3	40.7	(Pook Lane) - East Lavant	
West Sussex	Chichester	27	43	A27 (Northgate Gyratory) / A259 / B2145 / A285 / A27 / B2178 – Worthing, Bognor, Selsey, Witterings, Ring road, Portsmouth, Funtington, East Ashling	Beginning of the Chichester Ring Road
West Sussex	Chichester	27.2	43.8	B2178 (Spitalfeld Lane) to A27 – Worthing	
West Sussex	Chichester	27.5	44.3	A285 (Eastgate) to A27 / A259 / B2145 – Worthing, Bognor, Selsey	
West Sussex	Chichester	27.6	44.4	To A27 (Southgate Gyratory) – Portsmouth	
West Sussex	Chichester	27.9	44.9	A259 (Via Ravenna) to A27 – Fishbourne, Portsmouth	Loops back to the Northgate Gyratory
West Sussex	Chichester	28.4	45.7	(Station Approach) - Station	End of the Chichester Ring Road
West Sussex	Chichester	28.7	46.2	A27 (Stockbridge Roundabout) to A259 – Brighton, Worthing, Portsmouth, Bognor Regis	
West Sussex	Chichester	29	47	B2201 (St. George's Drive) to B2145 – Selsey, Sidlesham, Donnington	
West Sussex	Chichester	29.9	48.1	(Dell Quay Road) - Dell Quay	
West Sussex	near Chichester Marina	30.9	49.7	(Wophams Lane) - Sidlesham, Donnington	
West Sussex	Birdham	31.8	51.2	(Sidlesham Lane) - Sidlesham, Almodington	
West Sussex	Birdham	32.7	52.6	To B2198 (Bell Lane) / B2179 – Earnley, Bracklesham, East Wittering, Itchenor, West Wittering	southern terminus
West Sussex	1.000 mi = 1.609 km; 1.000 km = 0.621 mi				
