= Singleton, West Sussex =

Village and parish in West Sussex, England

Coordinates: 50°54′38″N 0°45′11″W

Singleton
- Village and civil parish
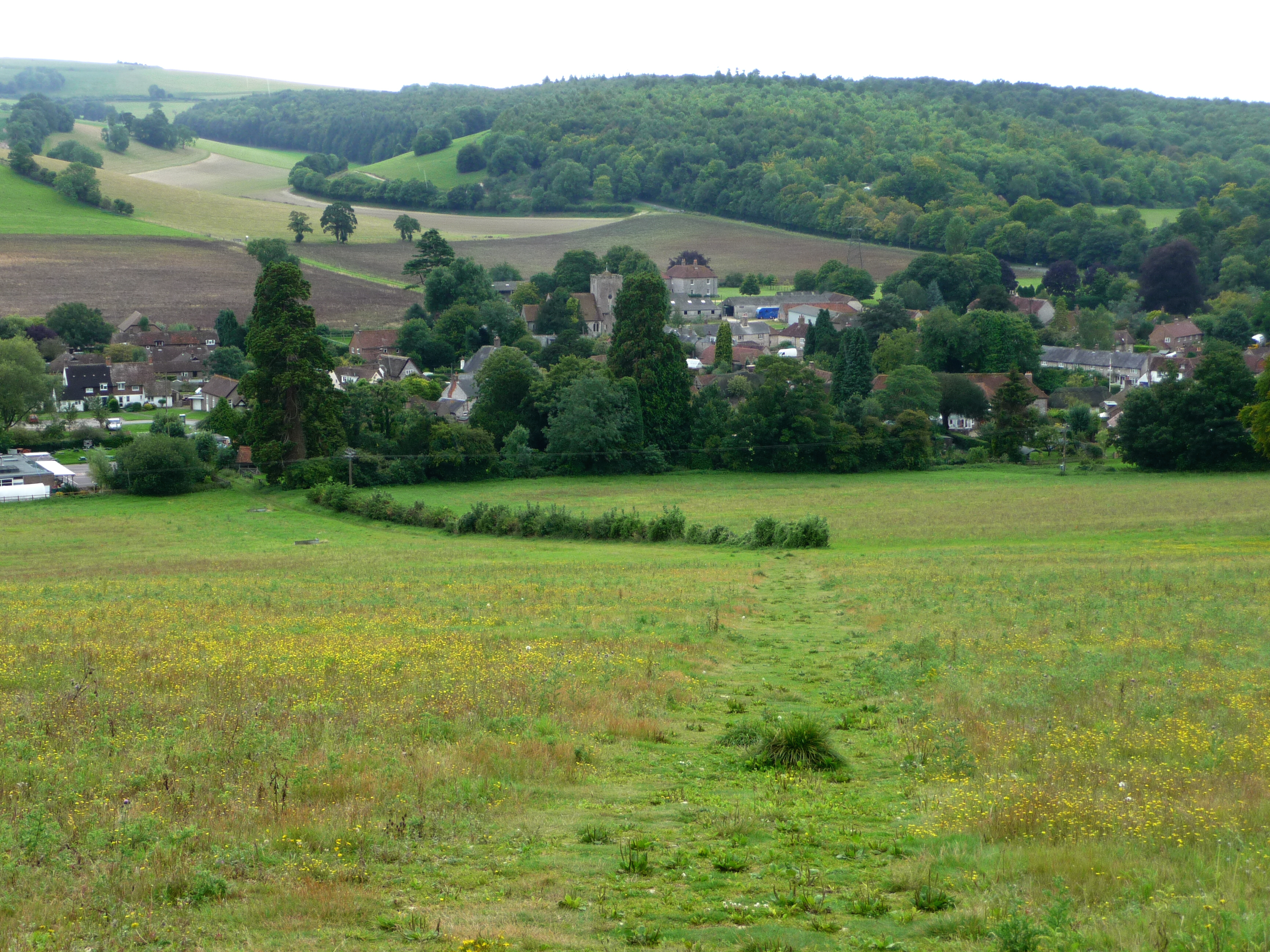
- View of Singleton from the north west

- Location within West Sussex
- Area: 16.02 km^{2} (6.19 sq mi)
- Population: 480 (2011 Census)
  - Density: 30/km^{2} (78/sq mi)
- OS grid reference: SU877130
  - London: 49 miles (79 km) NE
- Civil parish: Singleton
- District: Chichester
- Shire county: West Sussex
- Region: South East
- Country: England
- Sovereign state: United Kingdom
- Post town: CHICHESTER
- Postcode district: PO18
- Dialling code: 01243
- Police: Sussex
- Fire: West Sussex
- Ambulance: South East Coast
- UK Parliament: Chichester

Singleton is a village, Anglican parish and civil parish in the Chichester district of West Sussex, England. It lies in the Lavant valley, 5 miles (8 km) north of Chichester on the A286 road to Midhurst.

The civil parish, which includes the village of Charlton, has a land area of 1,602 hectares (3,960 acres). In the 2001 census there were 199 households containing 476 people, of whom 199 were economically active. The population marginally increased to 480 at the 2011 Census.

== History ==
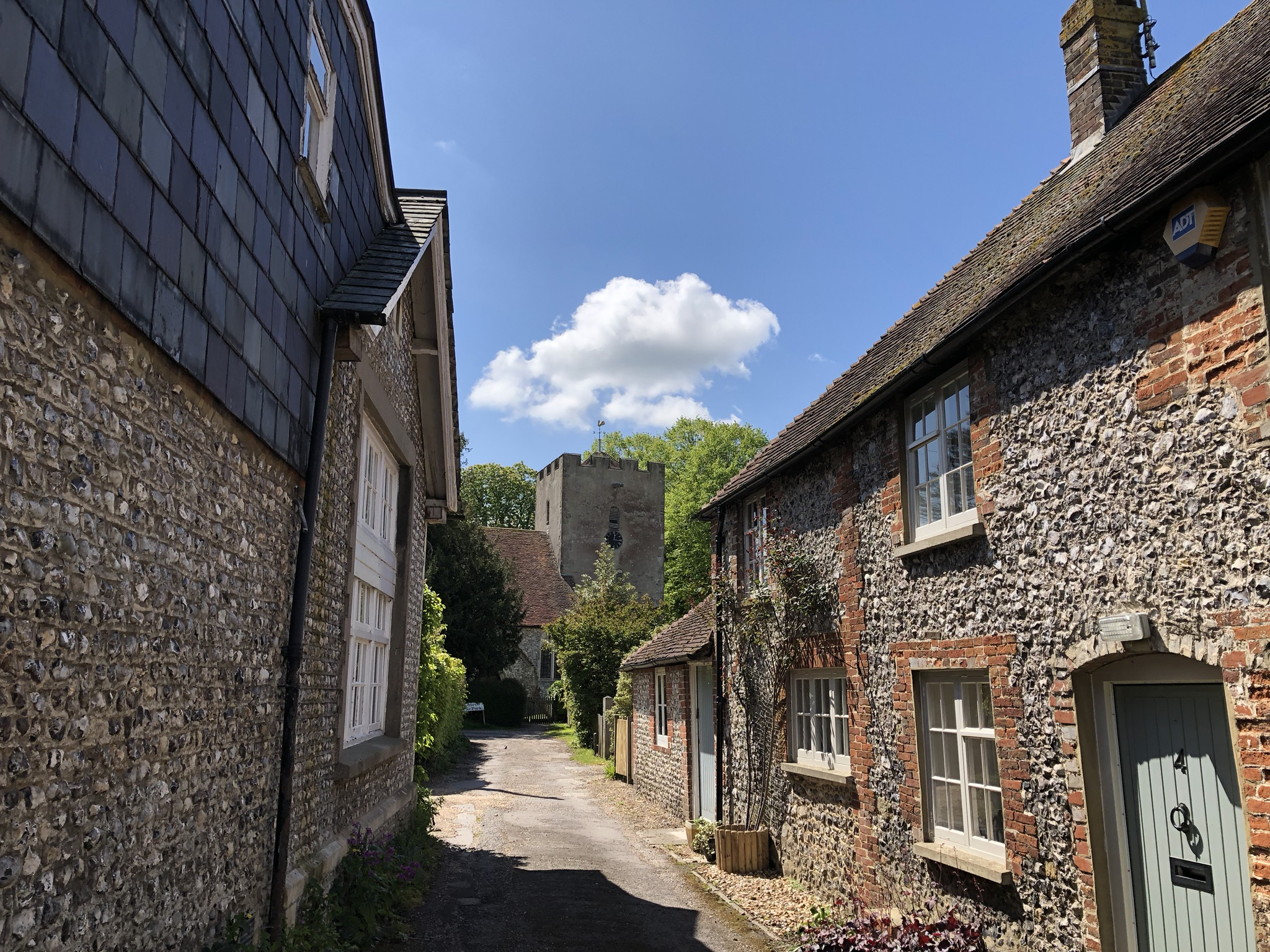
Path to the church

There is archaeological evidence of a Roman encampment at Singleton. The village name is derived from the Anglo-Saxon 'sengel', which means "burnt clearing".

Singleton (Silletone) was listed in the Domesday Book (1086) as the ancient hundred of the same name with 237 households including the settlements of East Lavant, Mid Lavant, Binderton and Preston. In Singleton parish itself there were 167 households: 89 villagers, 58 smallholders and 20 slaves; with ploughing land, woodland, meadows, three mills and a church, it had a value to the lords of the manor of £121.

In 1861, the population of the Anglican parish (Singleton with Charlton), was 556 and the area was 5,010 acres (2,030 ha).

From 1880, the Midhurst to Chichester railway passed through Cocking, Singleton and Lavant. Singleton station had four platforms. The Prince of Wales (later Edward VII) would come to the station by royal train when attending Goodwood races or visiting the James family at West Dean Park. A regular bus service had begun in the 1920s, and the rail service for passengers was discontinued in 1935, with freight continuing until the station fully closed in 1953; it became a private dwelling, and, with the former goods shed, is a listed building. On 20 August 2025, after the restoration of trackbed and platforms had been completed, they were opened as an extension of the Centurion Way cycle and footpath.

The railway tunnel remained intact and is now a protected site for bats.

== Parishes ==
=== Civil parish ===
Singleton civil parish includes Singleton and Charlton villages. There are 66 listed buildings in the parish, mostly in either of the two villages, but also some outlying buildings of note.

=== Anglican parish ===
The Anglican parish of Singleton, established in 2005, incorporates the three ancient churches at Singleton, East Dean and West Dean.

== Landmarks ==
=== Anglican parish church ===
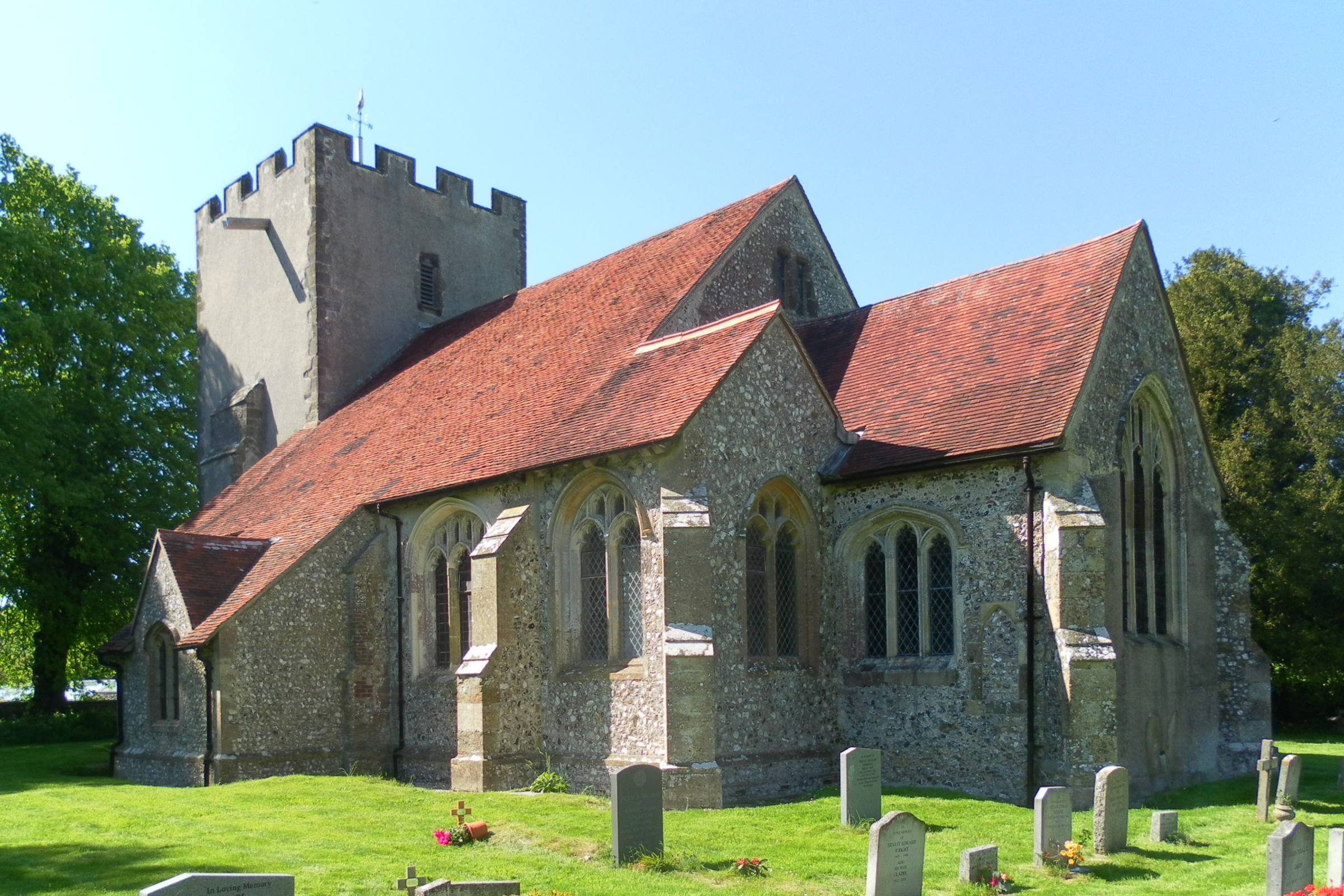
Church of the Blessed Virgin Mary

The Anglican parish church, dedicated to St Mary, has Anglo-Saxon nave walls and massive square tower. The aisles were added later. This was a hundredal church, the central church of the Hundred of Singleton, a Saxon administrative grouping of parishes. The tower has three Saxon windows and a Saxon doorway leading into thin air high up in the nave, showing that there was once an upper room above the nave. It is likely that the priests for the churches in the hundred would have lived in this room. The Saxon tower arch was rebuilt in the twelfth or thirteenth century with a pointed arch. The pews are from the Tudor period. The church is a Grade I listed building.

The parish war memorial in the graveyard is placed to be visible from the nearby village of Charlton, dating from the days when the parish was Singleton with Charlton. It is a Grade II-listed structure.

=== Public houses ===
In the centre of Singleton is The Partridge (formerly Fox and Hounds), a Grade II listed building from the 18th century or earlier. The Fox Goes Free pub (formerly The Pig and Whistle, then The Fox), in Charlton, is also Grade II listed, and is 17th century or earlier. The names reflect the fact that hunting was especially prevalent in the area. The latter pub hosted the first Women's Institute meeting in 1915. The property now known as 1-4 Grooms Yard was formerly the Horse and Groom standing prominently by the main road through the village; the pub closed and was converted to private residences. The 18th century building is also Grade II listed.

=== Goodwood ===
Goodwood Country Park lies to the south of the parish, part of the Goodwood House estate.

=== Weald and Downland Museum ===
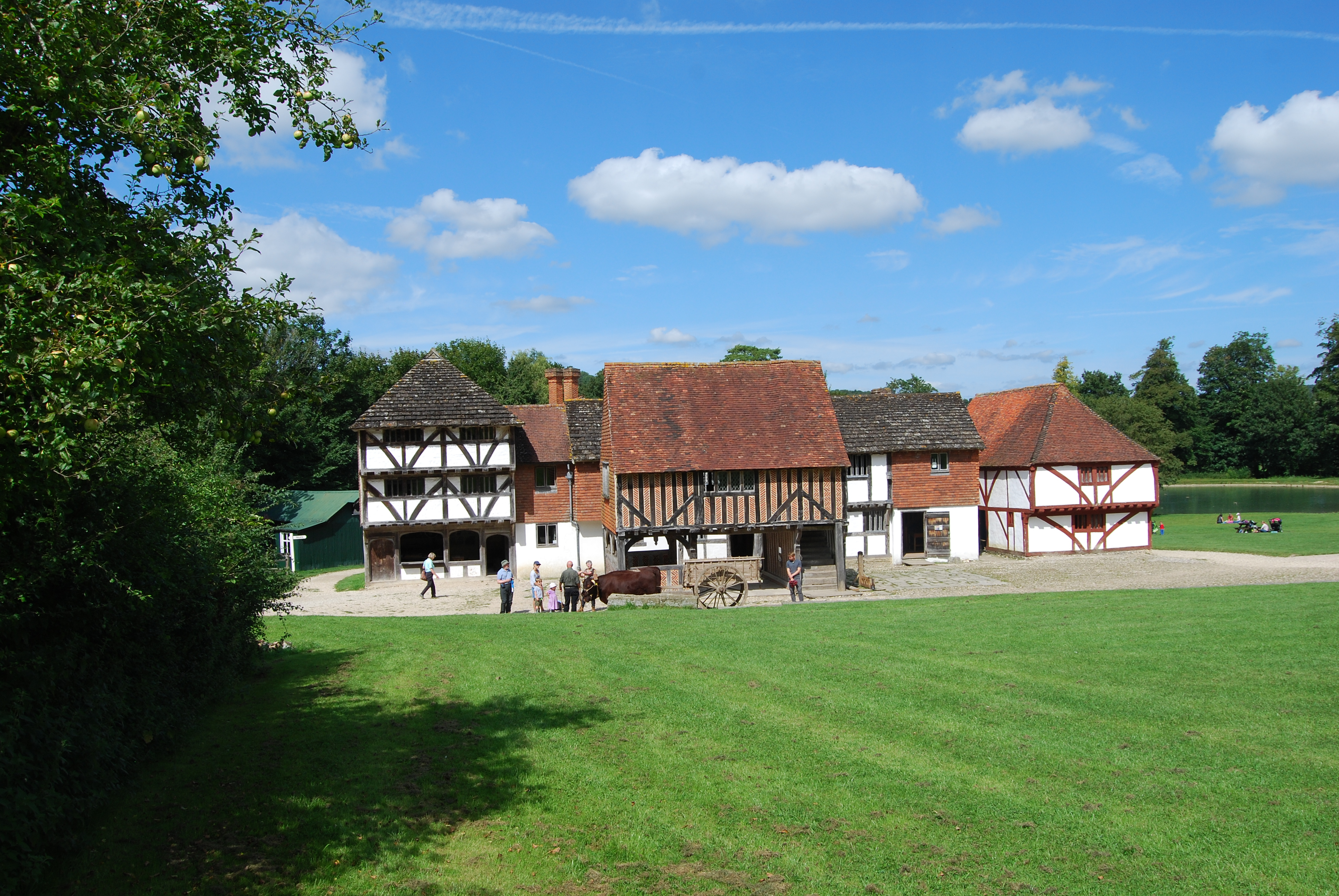
Weald and Downland Museum

The Weald and Downland Living Museum of historic buildings is situated on the edge of the village. Over 40 historic buildings from south-east England have been rescued from destruction, dismantled and reconstructed on the site. Along with the buildings, there are "hands-on" activities, such as cooking and weaving, and a number of yearly activities, including seasonal shows, historic gardens weekend and tree dressing.

Since 2017, a barn and its associated outbuildings has been the location of the BBC television series The Repair Shop.

Many other dramatic and factual film and TV programmes have been made at the museum, and the establishment has won many national awards, plus a Europa award for historic building conservation training.

=== River Lavant ===
The Lavant is one of two chalk streams in West Sussex; as a winterbourne, it normally flows from autumn to spring, and runs through the centre of the village and on through Chichester into Chichester Harbour. In the past, sheep farmers used it as sheep dips in many places.

=== Cricket ground ===
Situated at the southern end of the village, the current cricket ground was established in 1963 and the pavilion was erected in the 1977. The pavilion is a converted 17th century barn. The cricket club, established in the 1700s, plays regularly in the summer, and also hosts an annual duck race.

=== Singleton forest oil well ===
There is an oil well in Singleton forest in the north of the parish. This is one of 84 wells on DECC’s list for East and West Sussex, some dating back over 100 years.

There have been two pollution incidents at the Singleton Oil Field (now operated by IGas but operated by a different company when the incidents occurred). These occurred in the early 1990s, and were caused by failure of cement behind the conductor and the 9 5/8-inch casing. This was identified as a result of five groundwater monitoring boreholes installed at the Singleton Oil Field in 1993. The leak was from the well cellar (cement-lined cavity in which the well-head sits) via the preinstalled conductor and the 9 5/8-inch casing, both of which appear not to have been adequately cemented in-situ in at least one well. A thorough investigation commenced in 1997, including the drilling of a number (>11) of additional boreholes, and the carrying out of tracer tests and CCTV examination under the auspices of, and in consultation with, the UK Environment Agency. The leak paths, once identified and verified, were remediated. Monitoring has continued since that time and the observed pollution levels have remained below those set by the Environment Agency as requiring further action.
