= Lavant, West Sussex =

Village and parish in West Sussex, England

Coordinates: 50.87162°N 0.78236°W

Lavant
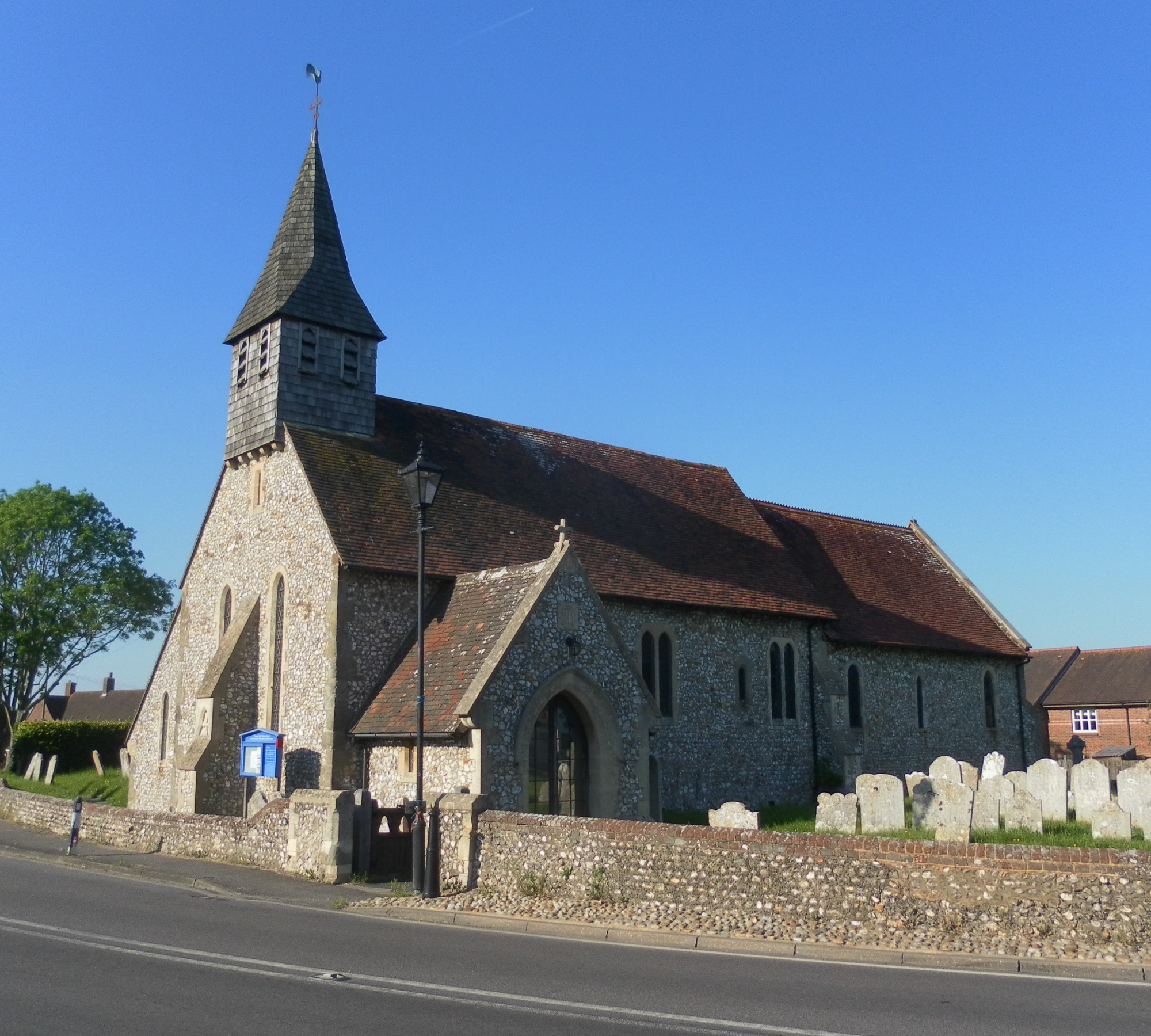
- Church of St Nicholas, Mid Lavant

- Location within West Sussex
- Area: 16.53 km^{2} (6.38 sq mi)
- Population: 1,656. 2011
  - Density: 96/km^{2} (250/sq mi)
- OS grid reference: SU857087
  - London: 52 miles (84 km) NNE
- Civil parish: Lavant
- District: Chichester
- Shire county: West Sussex
- Region: South East
- Country: England
- Sovereign state: United Kingdom
- Post town: CHICHESTER
- Postcode district: PO18
- Police: Sussex
- Fire: West Sussex
- Ambulance: South East Coast
- UK Parliament: Chichester

Lavant is a civil parish in the Chichester district of West Sussex, England, 2.2 miles (3.5 km) north of Chichester. It includes three villages: Mid Lavant and East Lavant, which are separate Anglican parishes, and the much smaller West Lavant. It takes its name from the River Lavant which flows from East Dean to Chichester.

The A286 road between Chichester and Midhurst runs through the parish.

The villages were served by a station in Mid Lavant, on the railway line that ran between Chichester and Midhurst, but this closed in stages between 1931 and 1991.

== History ==
=== Prehistory ===
In 1993, the Lavant drum, a small Neolithic cylinder, was discovered during excavations at Chalk Pit Lane. It is one of only five known objects of its type, and the only one discovered outside of Yorkshire. (The other four are the three Folkton drums, discovered in 1889 in North Yorkshire, and the Burton Agnes drum, discovered in 2015 in East Yorkshire.) It has been suggested that these objects were tools used to measure cord to standard lengths which were used in the construction of monuments such as Stonehenge and the timber circle at Durrington Walls.

=== East Lavant ===
East Lavant was listed in the Domesday Book.

In 1861, the population of the parish (with West Lavant) was 421, and the area was 2,884 acres (1,167 ha).

=== Mid Lavant ===
Mid Lavant (Loventone) was listed in the Domesday Book (1086) in the ancient hundred of Singleton as having 20 households: 10 villagers and 10 smallholders; with ploughing land and a mill, it had a value to the lords of the manor, Guy of Lavant and Ivo of Grandmesnil, of £9.

In 1861, the area of the small parish was 350 acres (140 ha), and described in Kelly's Directory of 1867 as "principally arable". The population in 1861 was 257. The Duke of Richmond was the principal landowner and patron of the parish church. The village pub is named after the Earl of March.

The parish church is dedicated to St Nicholas. It contains the vault of the May family, seated at Rawmere House in Mid Lavant, with a monument of Lady Mary May by John Bushnell.

== Landmarks ==
Kingley Vale lies on the border of the parish; it is a Site of Special Scientific Interest, a national nature reserve and is noted for its yew woodlands. Archaeological remains from the Bronze Age, Iron Age and Roman times have been identified.

== Governance ==
An electoral ward in the same name exists. This ward includes Westhampnett with a total ward population taken at the 2011 census of 2,365.

== Sport ==
Lavant is home to two sporting clubs, Lavant Football Club and Lavant Cricket Club.

== Notable people ==
- William Humphry (1814–1865), cricketer
