= Burton Agnes drum =

Neolithic artefact found in England

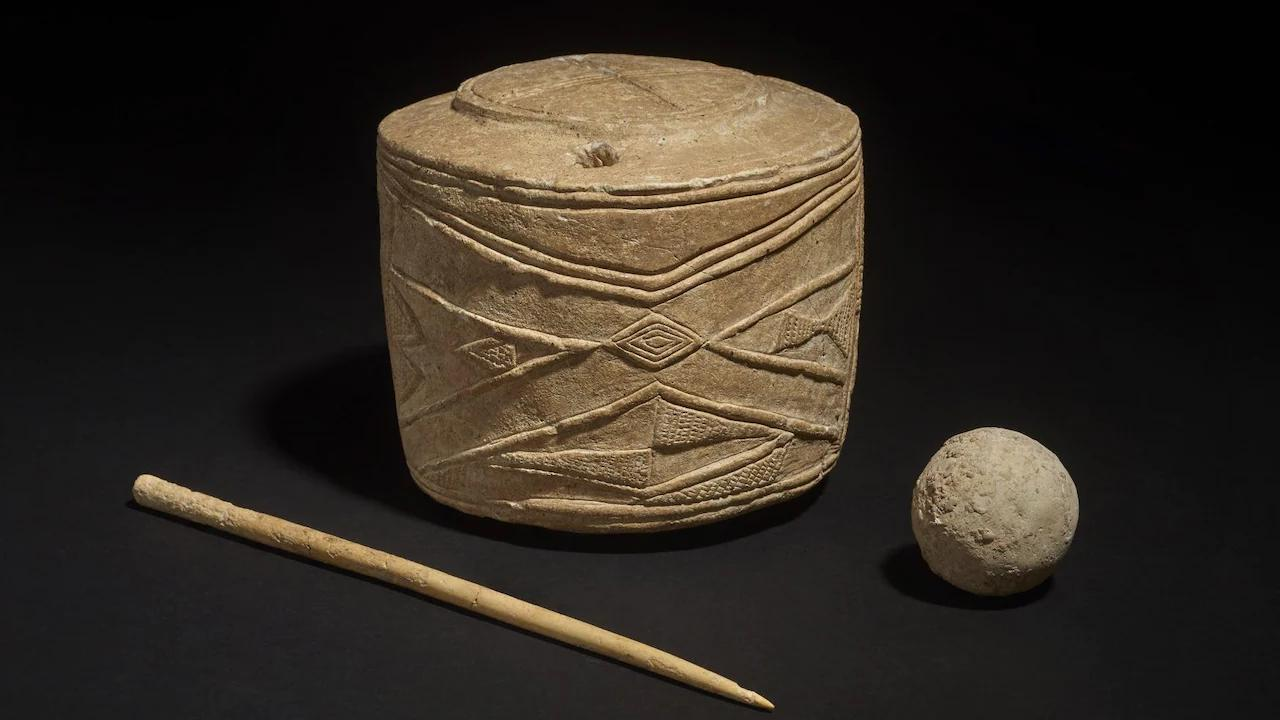
- The Burton Agnes drum in the temporary exhibition ″The World of Stonehenge″ at the British Museum
- Created: c. 2947 BC
- Discovered: 2015; England, United Kingdom
- Discovered by: Alice Beasley

The Burton Agnes drum is a carved chalk cylinder dated from 3005 to 2890 BC which was found in 2015 near Burton Agnes, East Riding of Yorkshire, England. The British Museum has described it as "the most important piece of prehistoric art to be found in Britain in the last 100 years" and "one of the most significant ancient objects ever found on the British Isles". It was found in the grave of three children, along with a chalk ball and a bone pin.

The drum was found by archaeologist Alice Beasley, working for Allen Archaeology under director Mark Allen, during a routine investigation made as part of the planning application for a biogas power station to be built on the land, part of the Burton Agnes estate. She has described the find:

It was the middle of winter and the weather was terrible. To find something so rare is incredible. We uncovered the skeletons and were clearing around the head when it appeared and we realised we'd found something special.

Allen has said:

The detailed relief carving on the drum is quite something to behold and shows great skill by its maker. Research is ongoing on the drum, the burials and the surrounding excavations, and we look forward to publishing more on this in the future.

It is similar to the Folkton drums found in Folkton, Yorkshire, about 15 miles (24 km) from Burton Agnes, in 1889; these have been associated with the Lavant drum found in Lavant, Sussex in 1979.

The Burton Agnes drum was displayed to the public for the first time as part of the 2022 World of Stonehenge exhibition at the British Museum, alongside the three Folkton drums.
