= Lavant drum =

The Lavant drum is small cylindrical Neolithic chalk object excavated in 1993. It is similar to the Folkton drums, discovered over a century earlier and the Burton Agnes drum. Unlike the Folkton drums, the Lavant drum is undecorated; however, it may be that earlier markings have been worn away. The drum was associated with a sherd of Mortlake ware, which implies a Middle Neolithic date. It is currently held at The Novium museum in Chichester.

Anne Teather, Andrew Chamberlain and Mike Parker Pearson proposed in 2019 that the Folkton and Lavant drums were tools to measure cord to standard lengths which were used in the construction of monuments such as Stonehenge and the timber circle at Durrington Walls. The circumference of each of the drums corresponds to a subdivision of 10 Neolithic 'long feet'. Chamberlain and Parker Pearson propose that the Neolithic long foot is equivalent to 1.056 modern feet or 0.3219 metres. The Lavant drum's circumference of 361.3 mm corresponds to 1.1225 long feet or 1/9 of ten long feet.

The drum was discovered in 1993 as part of the excavation of Chalk Pit Lane, Lavant, West Sussex. The excavation was not published due to the insolvency of Southern Archaeology, who took over the Chichester and District Archaeology Unit which carried out the original excavation. It was identified as being similar to the Folkton drum in 2005 by Anne Teather.
