= Folkton Drums =

Archaeological find in England

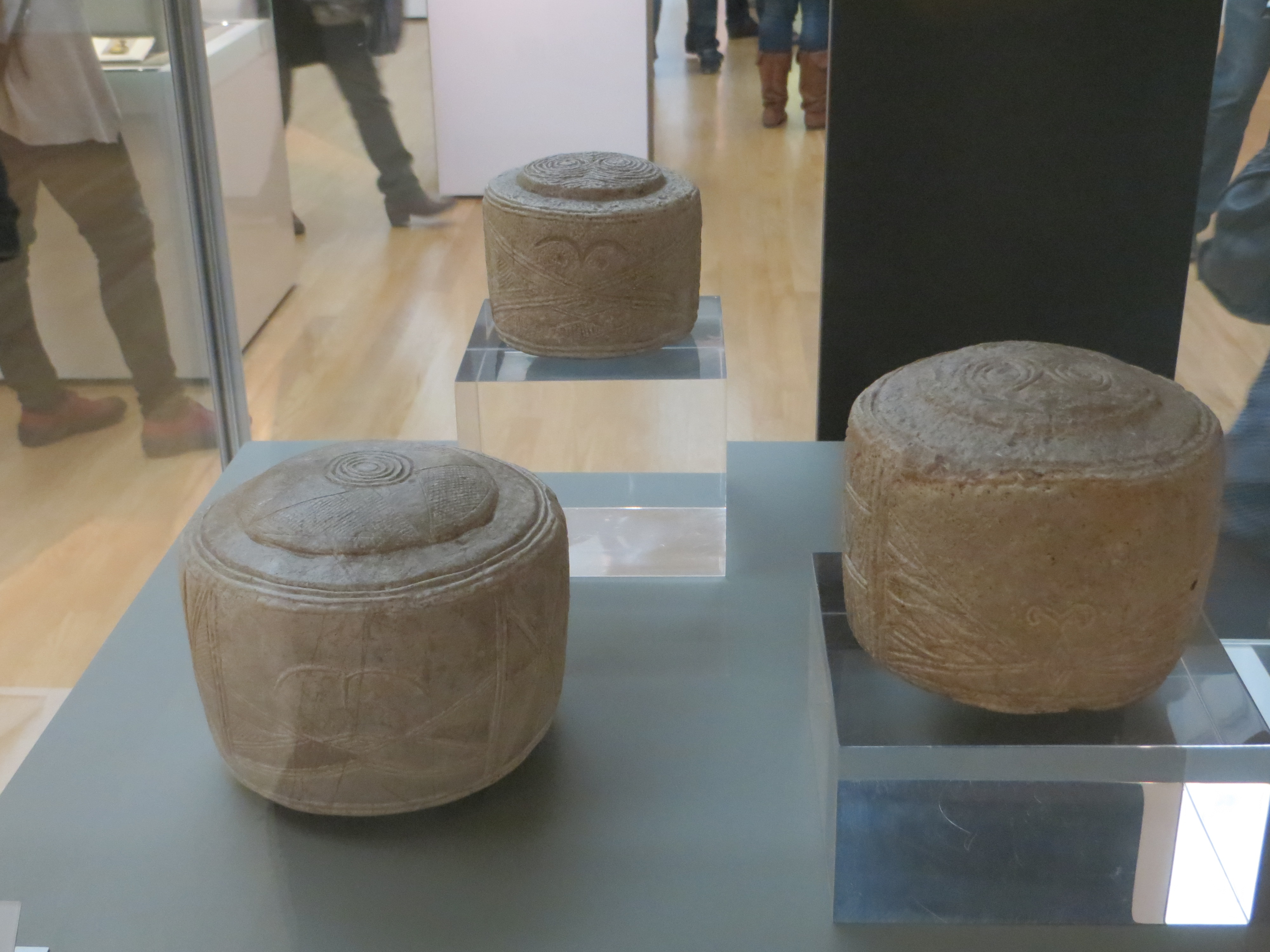
- Folkton Drums displayed in the British Museum
- Material: Chalk
- Size: 8.7 cm (height)
- Created: 2600–2100 BC
- Discovered: 1889
- Present location: British Museum
- Identification: P&EE 1893 12-28 15-17

The Folkton Drums are a rare set of three decorated chalk objects in the shape of drums or solid cylinders dating from the Neolithic period. Found in a child's grave near the village of Folkton in the East Riding of Yorkshire in northern England, they are now on loan to Stonehenge Visitor Centre from the British Museum. A similar object, the Burton Agnes drum was found 15 miles (24 km) away near Burton Agnes in 2015, and another example, the Lavant drum, was excavated in 1993 in Lavant, West Sussex.

Their purpose remains obscure. They were given the name "drum" to describe their shape, rather than from any thought they might be percussion instruments.

== Discovery ==
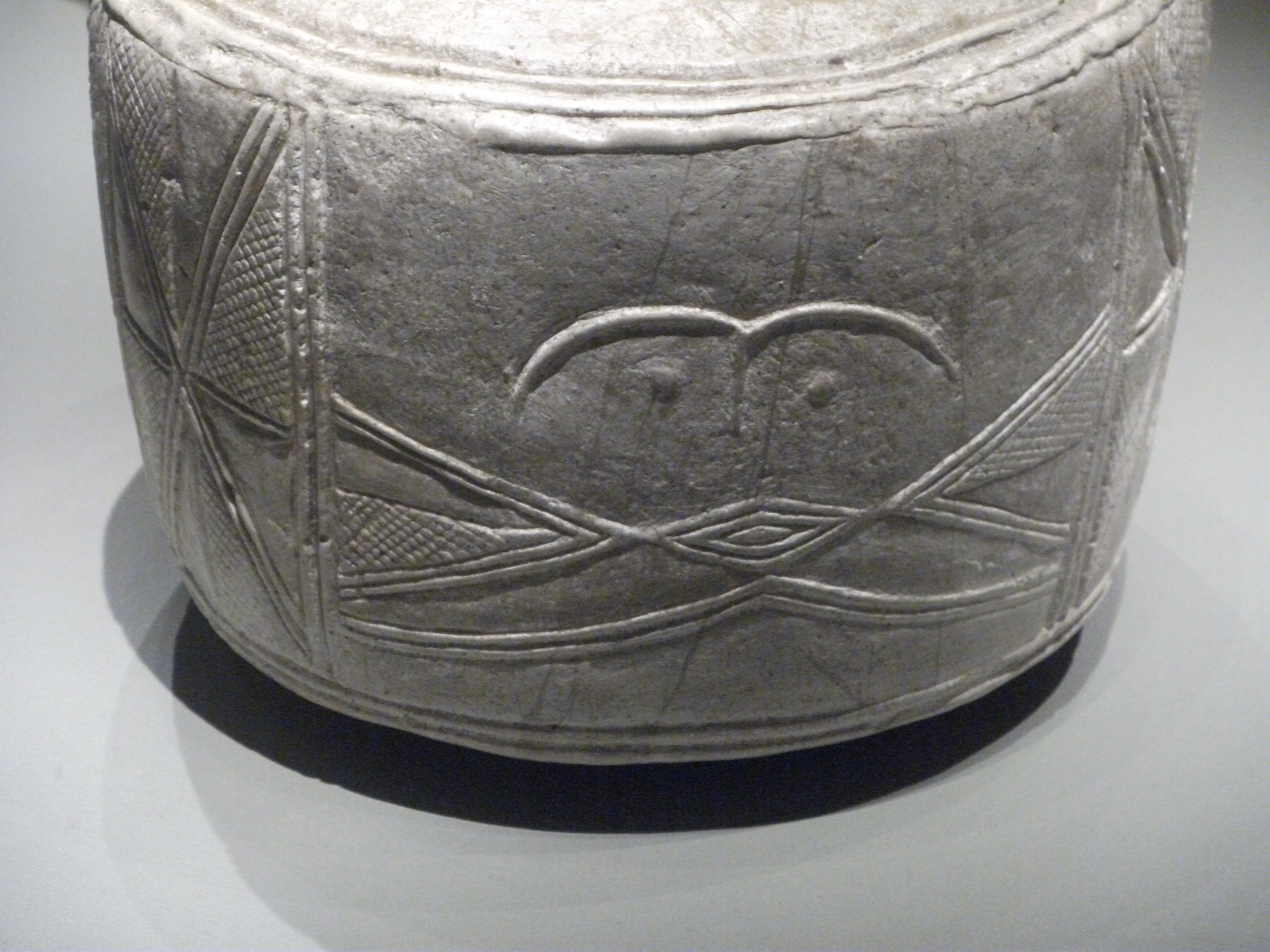
Detail of the schematic face on one of the drums

In 1889, a round prehistoric barrow was opened by the scholar and amateur archaeologist William Greenwell near Folkton, now in North Yorkshire. Inside, he found a Neolithic grave dating to the time of Stonehenge, estimated to be between 2600 and 2000 BC. The remains of several bodies were unearthed, one of whom was a child beside which the three drums were found. The rarity of this find suggests that the child came from an elite group in society. Four years after the discovery, the drums were donated by Greenwell, along with other parts of his collection, to the British Museum.

== Description ==
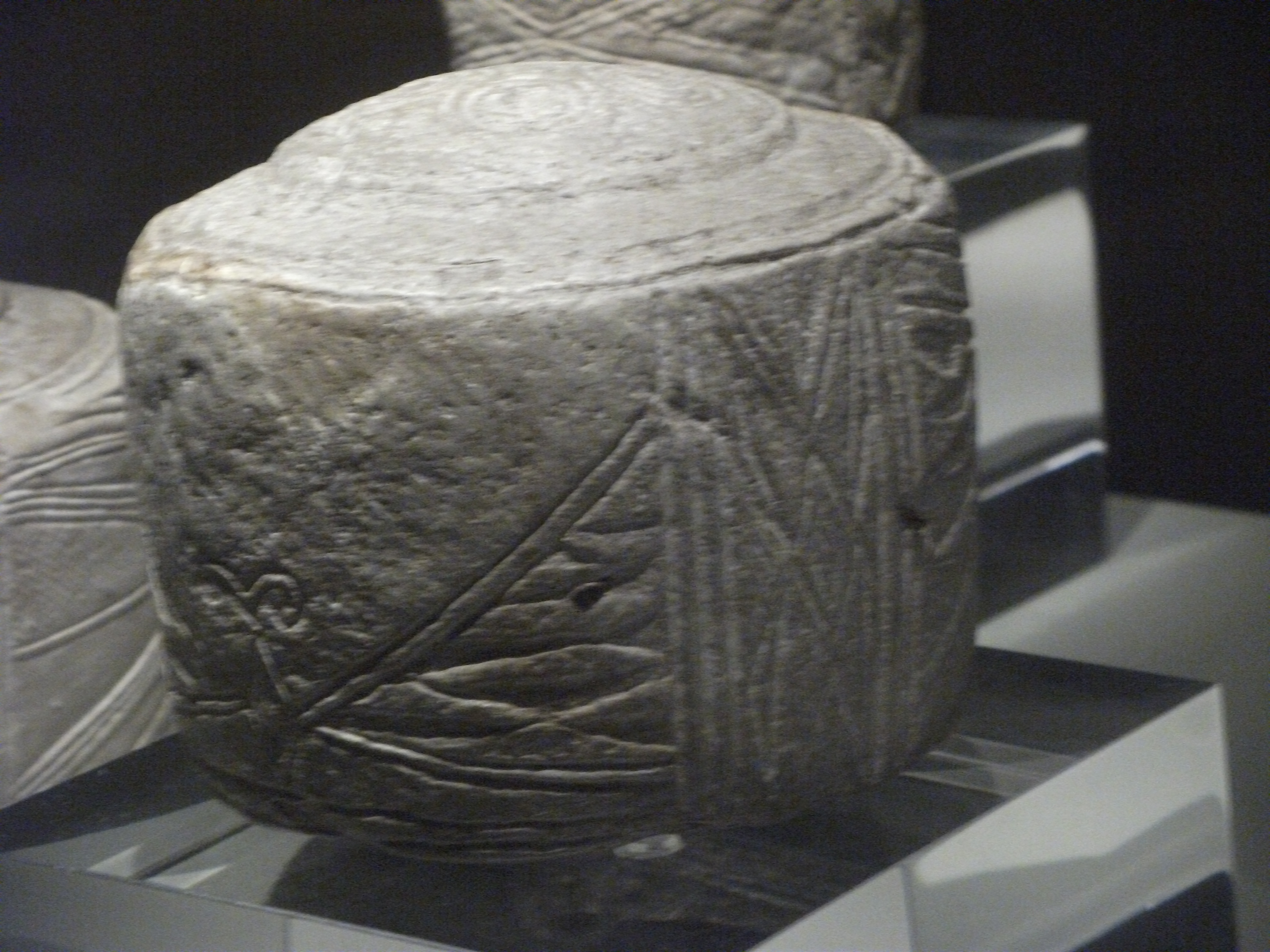
Side image of a drum with geometric patterns

The three drum-like forms are made of locally quarried chalk and are decorated with stylised human faces and geometric patterns. On the top of the cylinders are a series of concentric circles and two of them have pairs of eyes that schematically denote a human face. The decoration of the drums has similarities to objects made in the Beaker culture and early British Bronze Age, including the use of chevron and lozenge forms.

=== Mathematics ===
A study published in 2018 noted that the circumferences of the drums form whole-number divisions (ten, nine and eight times, respectively) of ten long feet, a unit of measure thought to have been widely used in Neolithic Britain. The drums could therefore have been used as measuring devices, as a means of achieving standardisation in construction at different locations. The diameters, and hence the circumferences, of the drums also form a mathematical harmonic sequence. According to author Prof. Andrew Chamberlain, "The existence of these measuring devices implies an advanced knowledge in prehistoric Britain of geometry and of the mathematical properties of circles.”

The study also proposed that the drums represent ceremonial objects that have uniquely survived due to their unusual material, while most objects of this type may have been made out of wood. The Lavant drum, excavated in 1993, was previously identified as being analogous to the Folkton drums in 2005 by archaeologist Anne Teather.

== Legacy ==
Children's writer and poet Michael Rosen wrote a poem "Folkton Drums" in 2018 in connection with the University of Reading's Grave Goods project.

== Display ==
The three Folkton drums were displayed as part of the 2022 World of Stonehenge exhibition at the British Museum, alongside the Burton Agnes Drum, which was in the public view for the first time.

== Gallery ==
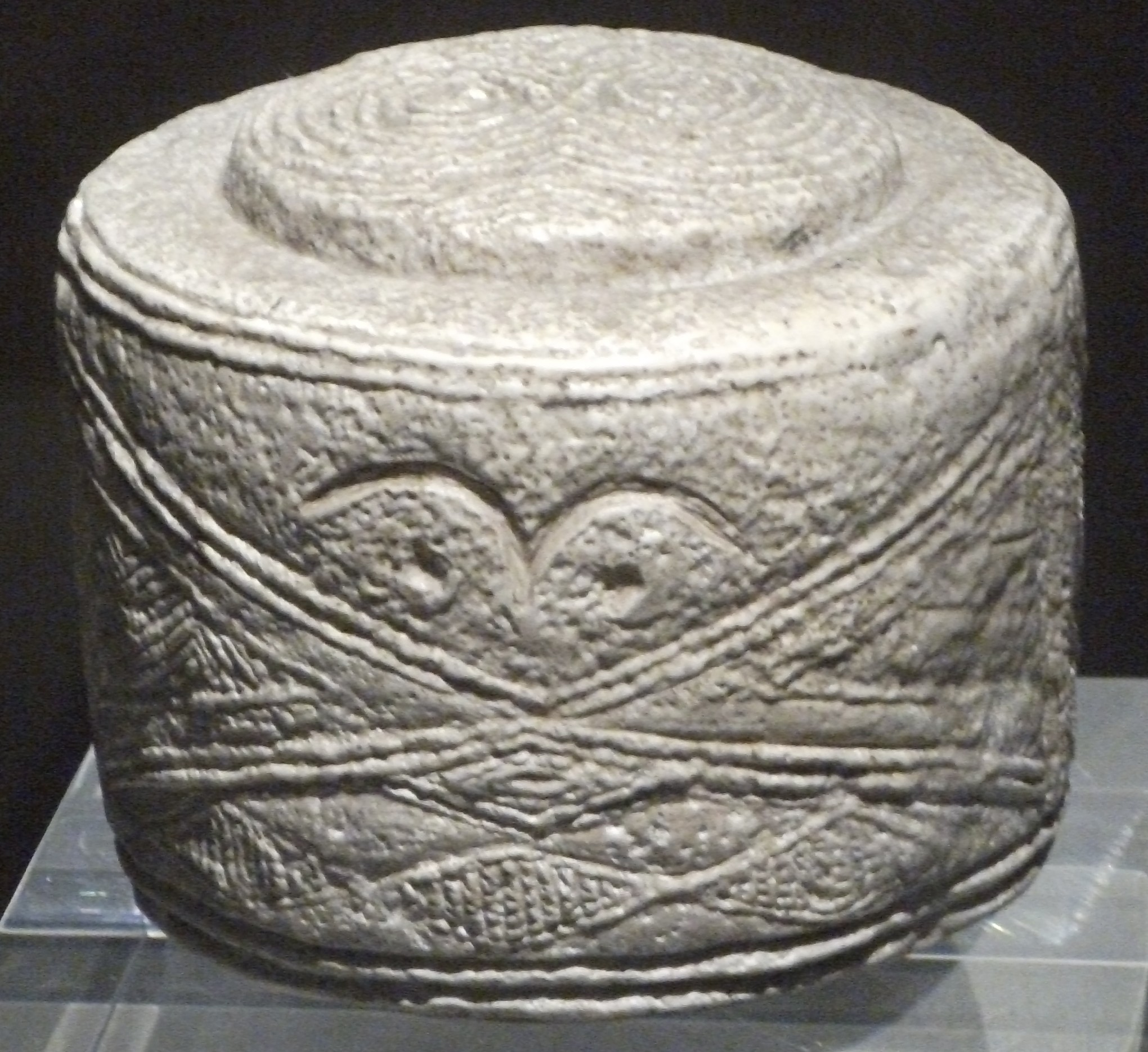
View of another face with prominent features

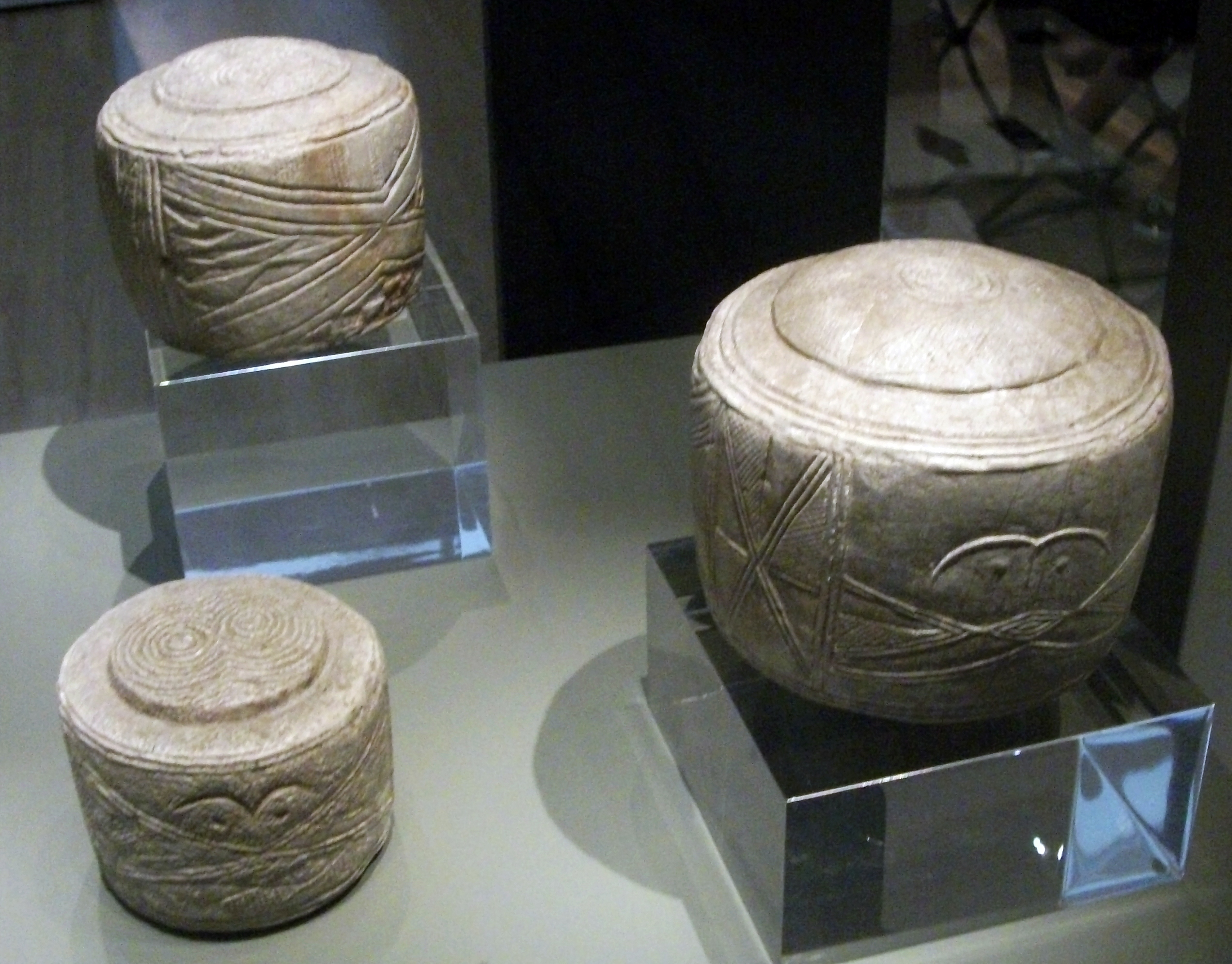
Alternative view of the three drums

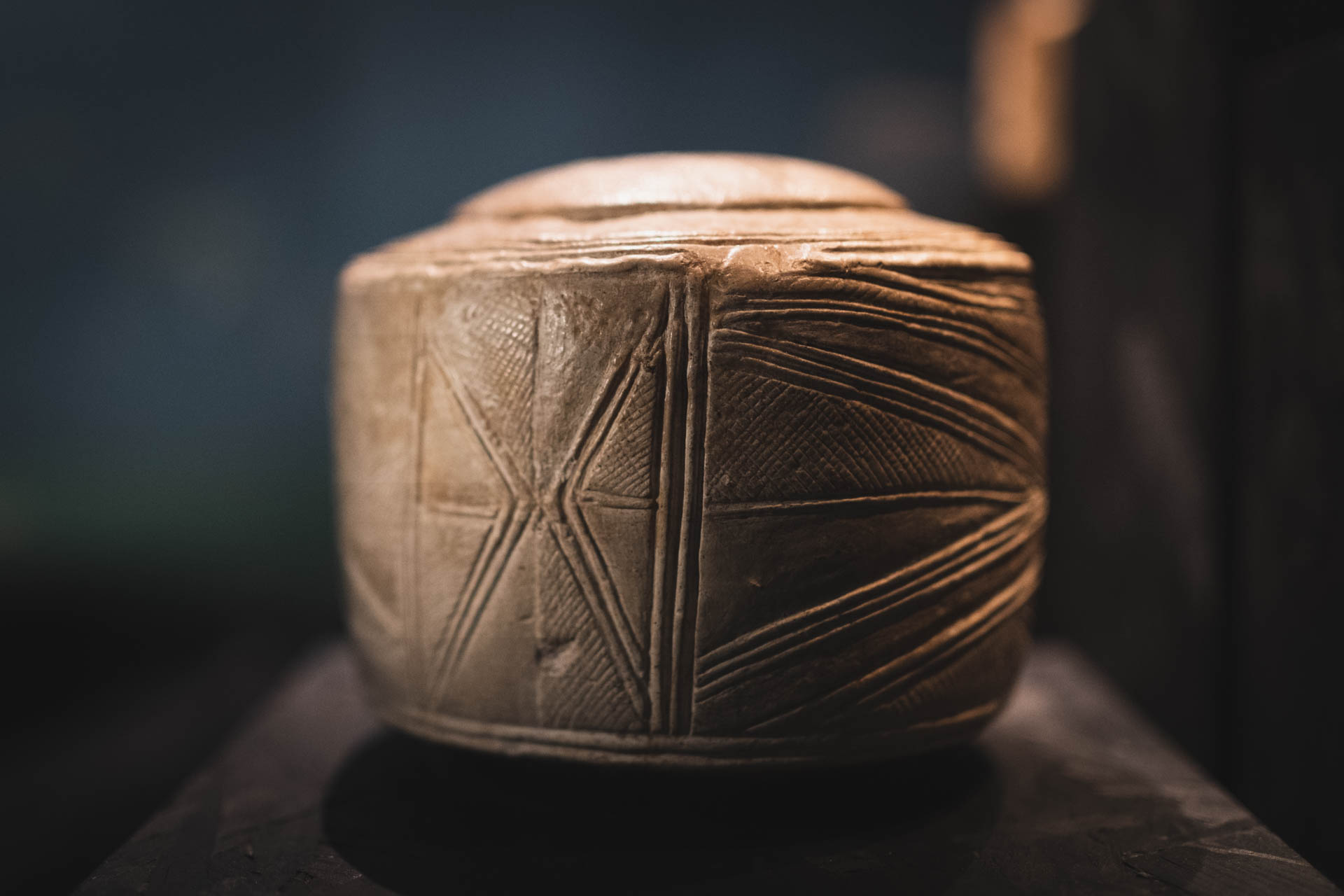
Another view

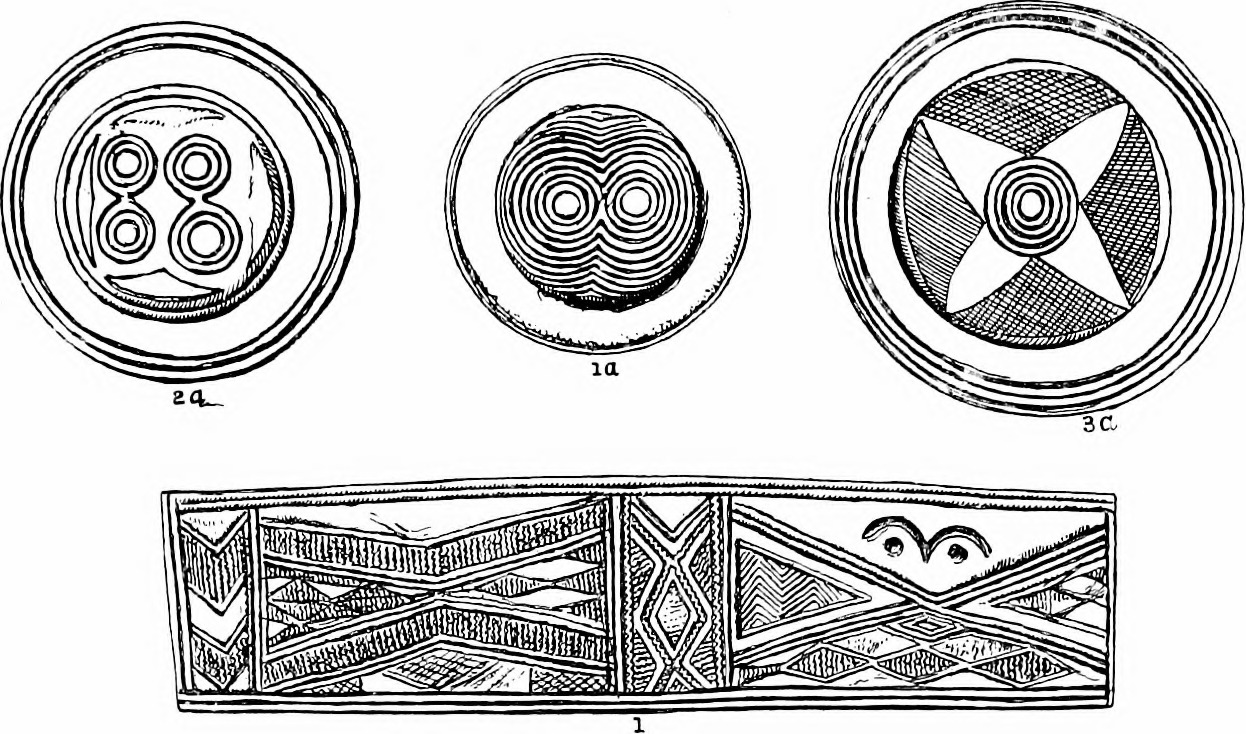
BM guide, 1904

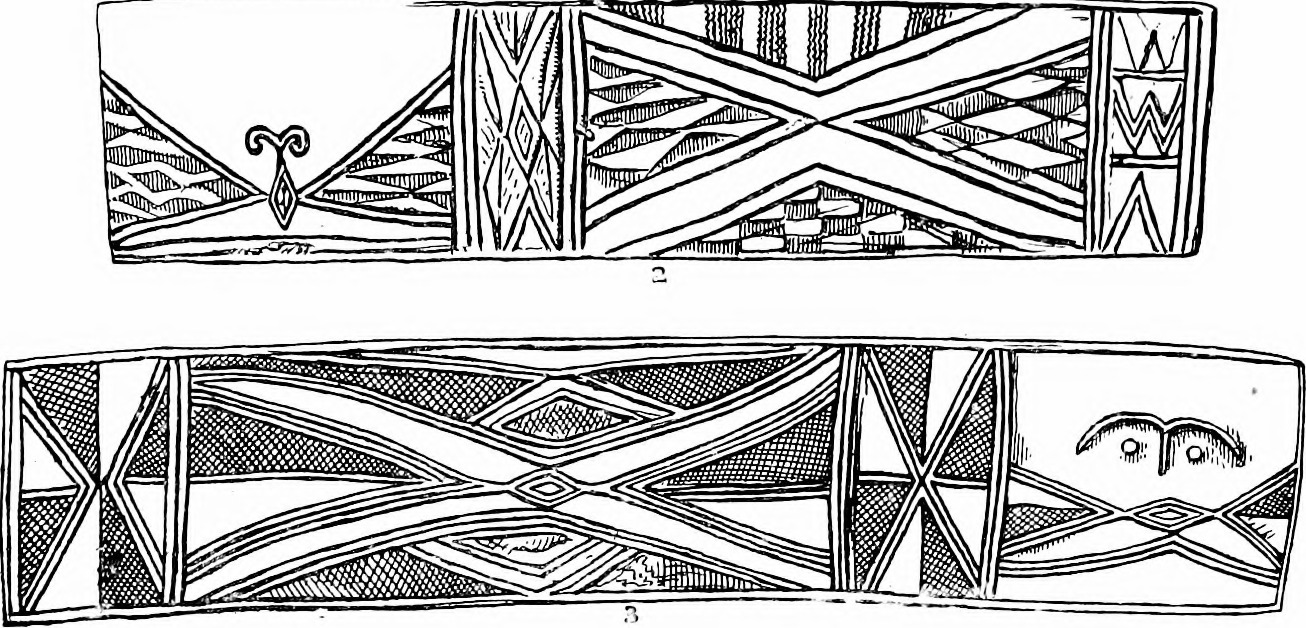
BM guide, 1904

== See also ==
- Carved stone balls
- Stonehenge
- Neolithic British Isles
- Bush Barrow
- Bronze Age Britain

== Bibliography ==
- H. Longworth, 'The Folkton Drums unpicked' in Grooved Ware in Britain and Ireland, Neolithic Studies Group Seminar Papers 3 (Oxford, Oxbow Books, 1999), pp. 83–88
- D. V. Clarke, T. G. Cowie and A. Foxon, Symbols of power at the time of Stonehenge (London, HMSO, 1985)
- I. A. Kinnes and I. H. Longworth, Catalogue of the excavated Prehistoric and Roman-British material in the Greenwell Collection (London, The British Museum Press, 1985)
