= West Dean, West Sussex =

Village and parish in West Sussex, England

Coordinates: 50.906°N 0.777°W

West Dean
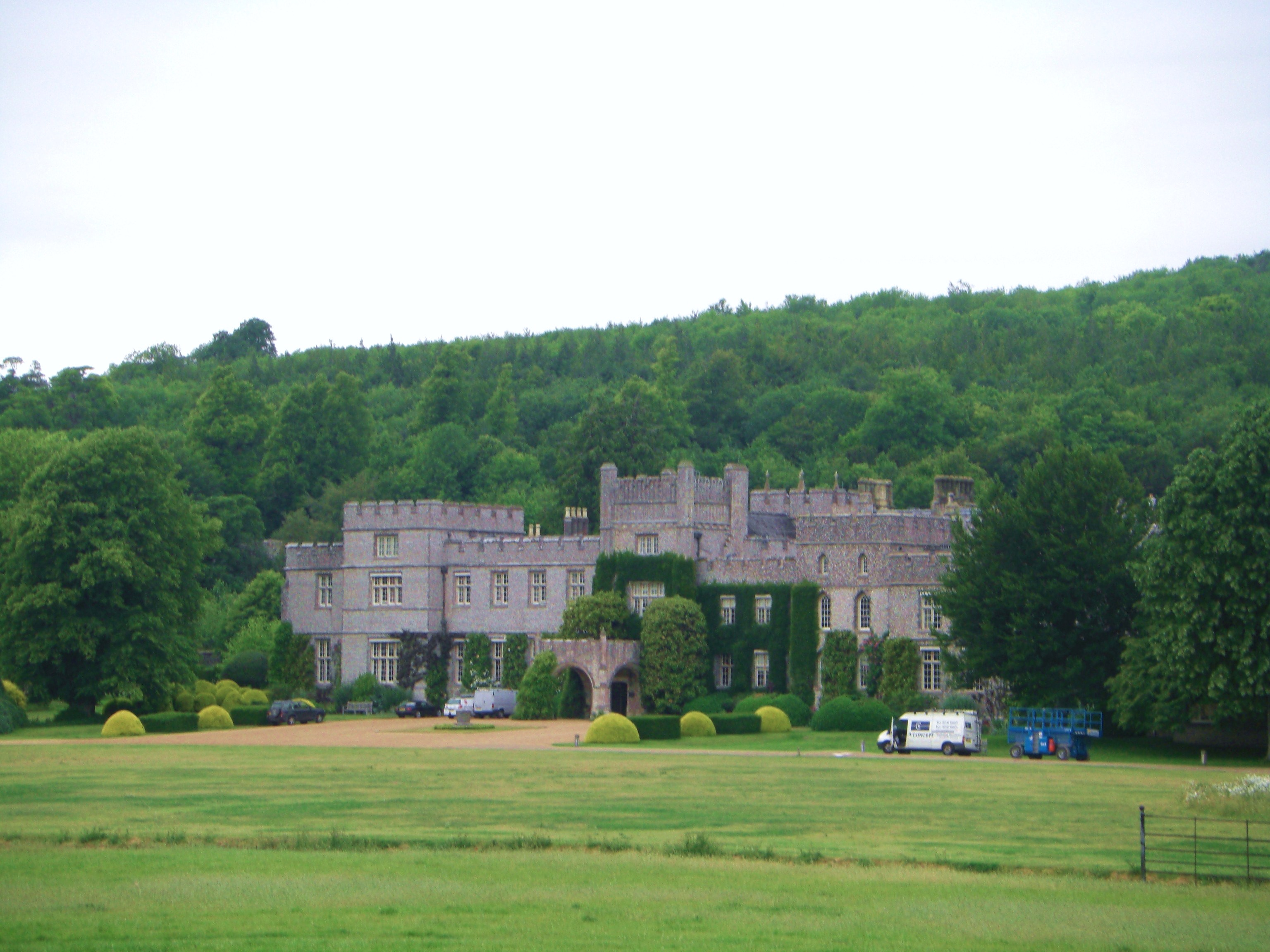
- West Dean House

- Location within West Sussex
- Area: 24.84 km^{2} (9.59 sq mi)
- Population: 481 2011 Census
  - Density: 17/km^{2} (44/sq mi)
- OS grid reference: SU861126
  - London: 50 miles (80 km) NE
- Civil parish: West Dean
- District: Chichester
- Shire county: West Sussex
- Region: South East
- Country: England
- Sovereign state: United Kingdom
- Post town: Chichester
- Postcode district: PO18
- Dialling code: 01243
- Police: Sussex
- Fire: West Sussex
- Ambulance: South East Coast
- UK Parliament: Chichester

West Dean is a village, Anglican parish and civil parish in the District of Chichester in West Sussex, England 5 miles (8 km) north of Chichester on the A286 road just west of Singleton. The parishes include the hamlets of Binderton and Chilgrove.

The civil parish has a land area of 6,136 acres (2,483 ha). The 2001 Census recorded 425 people living in 177 households, of whom 248 were economically active. The village is on the Monarch's Way long-distance footpath.

West Dean is in the Lavant Valley in the South Downs and has a Church of England parish church and one public house, The Selsey Arms. The church and most of the houses are built of flint, in most cases with brick quoins and window dressings.

== History ==
=== West Dean ===
The Manor of West Dean was in the ancient hundred of Singleton, but was not mentioned by name in the Domesday Book of 1086. West Dean is a large Anglican parish and in 1861 extended to 2,290 acres (930 ha) of arable, pasture, and woodland with a population of 681. The parish included Chilgrove.

=== Binderton ===
The Domesday Book records Binderton (Bertredtone) in the Hundred of Singleton in the lands belonging to Earl Roger. It says:

The Earl himself holds Binderton. Countess Gytha held it. Then assessed at 7 hides but now three. There is land for four ploughs. In demesne there are two ploughs and eight villeins with nine bordars with two ploughs. There are four acres of meadow and a church. TRE it was worth 100 shillings then sixty shillings, now seven pounds.

There is evidence of there having been both a chapel and church at Binderton, but not since the 17th century. Kelly's Directory of 1867 says:

Binderton is sometimes considered as a tithing of West Dean, but is a distinct chapelry, and is separately assessed in all parochial rates and taxes. It anciently belonged to the Cistercian nuns of Tarrent, in Dorsetshire, but afterwards became the property of Lord Lumley: the family of Smyth became seised of it, and subsequently, by exchange, it became the property of Sir James Peachy, Bart., and is inherited by the Hon. Mrs. Leveson Vernon Harcourt. The present mansion is occupied by the Rev. H. W. R. Luttman- Johnson. The area is 1,790 acres, and the population is 96. Parish Clerk, James Till.

The remains of the former chapel stand opposite Binderton House.

=== Preston ===
Preston, now a farm between West Dean and Binderton, was considered significant enough to be included in the Domesday survey, where it was listed as having seven households: three villagers and four smallholders. It had ploughing lands and 6 acres (2.4 ha) of meadows.

== Parish church ==
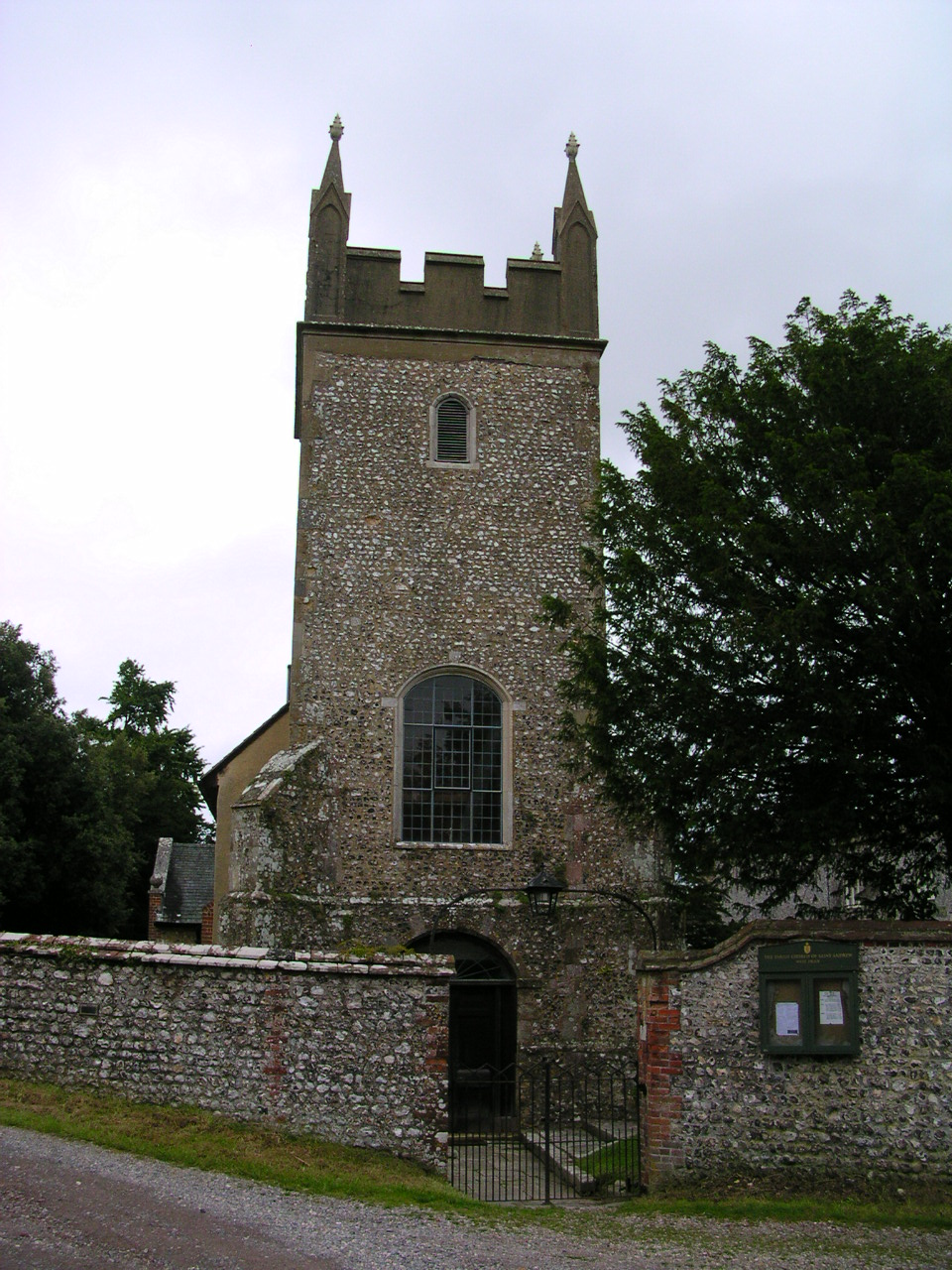
St Andrew's Church

The Church of England parish church of Saint Andrew is a Saxon building from before the Norman conquest of England. It was badly damaged by a fire in 1934 but then sensitively restored under the direction of Frederick Etchells.

== West Dean House ==
West Dean House is a Georgian "Gothick" country house that now houses West Dean College, a specialist college with a worldwide reputation for the study of conservation, making and visual arts. James Wyatt designed the house and it was built in 1804 for Baron Selsey of the Peachey family. After the death of the last Peachey heir it became the home of William James in 1891 and in 1893 much of the house was remodelled to designs by Ernest George and Harold Peto. His son Edward James, donated it to a charitable trust (the Edward James Foundation) in 1964 and it became a college in 1971. Peto also designed the walled gardens, which with the glasshouses and other gardens around the house are open to the public. There is also a park and arboretum.

== Landmarks ==
Kingley Vale is on the border of the parish and is a Site of Special Scientific Interest and a national nature reserve. It is noted for its yew woodlands. The site is also of archaeological interest including Bronze Age and Roman earthworks, cross dykes, Goosehill Camp on Bow Hill and an ancient field system.

Binderton House is a 17th-century Grade II listed house, formerly the home of Anthony Eden.

== Sources ==
- Nairn, Ian; Pevsner, Nikolaus (1965). Sussex. The Buildings of England. Harmondsworth: Penguin Books. pp. 368–369. ISBN 0-14-071028-0.
