= The Fox Goes Free =

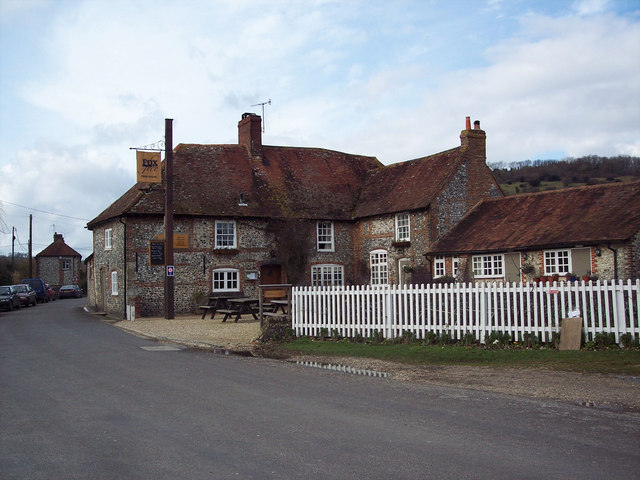
- The Fox Goes Free, 2007

- Location within West Sussex
- 50°54′35″N 0°44′15″W
- Type: Public house
- Location: Charlton
- OS grid reference: SU8886613020

History
- Built: 17th century

Site notes
- Area: West Sussex

Listed Building – Grade II
- Official name: The Fox Goes Free
- Designated: 28 Jan 1986
- Reference no.: 1354592

The Fox Goes Free is a grade II listed pub in Charlton, West Sussex, England. It is a 17th-century flint building.

On 9 November 1915 the inn was the venue for the first Women's Institute (WI) meeting held in England, after the first meeting in Wales on 16 September of that year. This was the inaugural meeting of the Singleton and East Dean WI (still in existence in 2015), and the landlady of the pub, Mrs Laishley, was a founder member. At one time the pub also served as the village bakery.

The pub was originally known as "The Pig and Whistle" and later "The Fox" and "The Fox at Charlton", but was renamed "The Fox Goes Free" after a change of ownership in 1985.

On 9 November 2015 the Fox's entry in the National Heritage List for England was updated to include the WI connection, as were records for three other buildings of WI significance.
