= East Lavant =

Village in West Sussex, England

Coordinates: 50.86885°N 0.77598°W

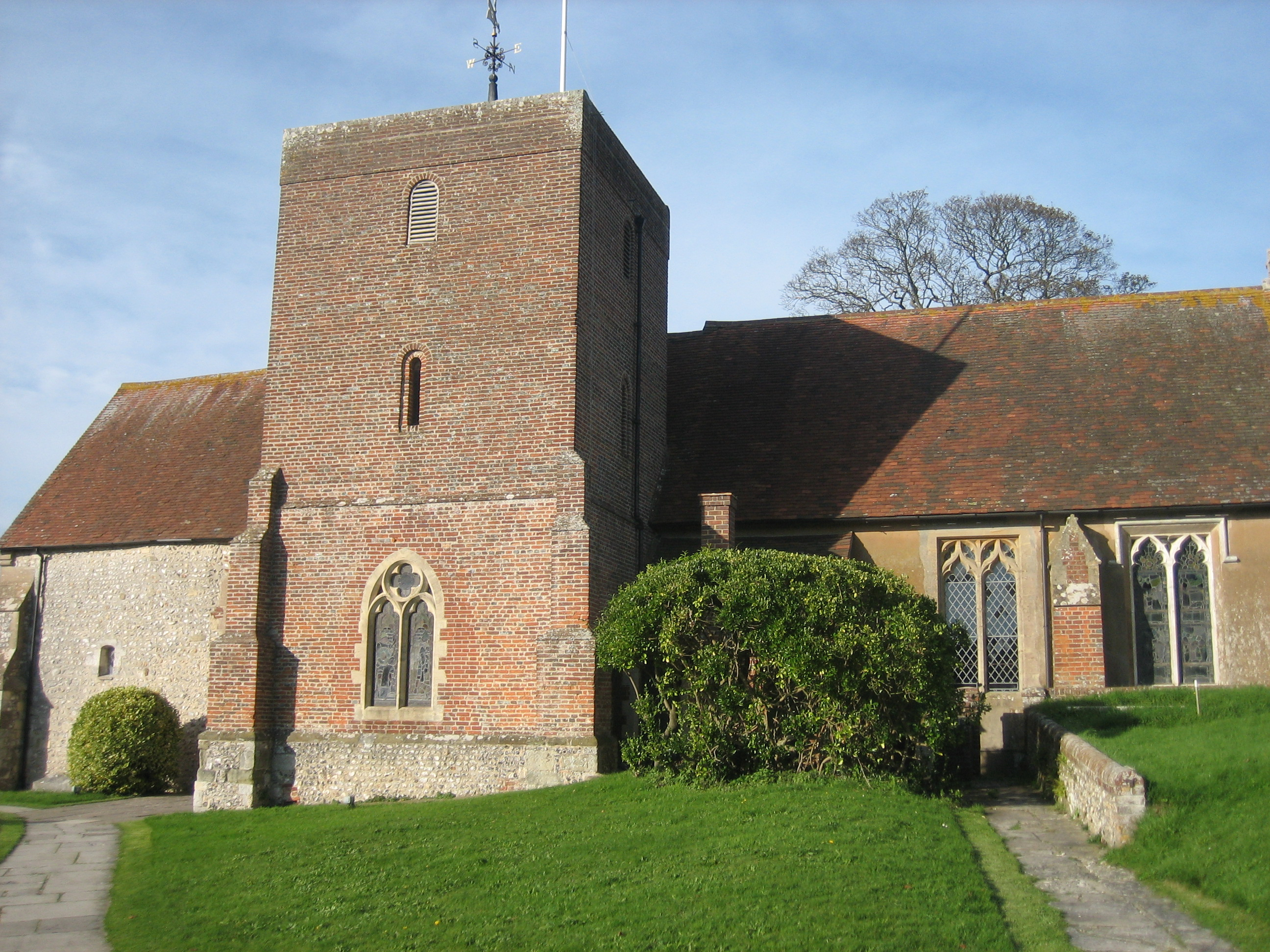
- Church of St. Mary

- Location within West Sussex
- OS grid reference: SU862084
- Civil parish: Lavant
- District: Chichester
- Shire county: West Sussex
- Region: South East
- Country: England
- Sovereign state: United Kingdom
- Post town: Chichester
- Postcode district: PO18
- Police: Sussex
- Fire: West Sussex
- Ambulance: South East Coast
- UK Parliament: Chichester

East Lavant is one part, which along with Mid Lavant make up the village of Lavant in the Chichester district of West Sussex, England. It lies just east of the A286 road 2.2 miles (3.5 km) north of Chichester. It is in the civil parish of Lavant. East Lavant has a collection of historic cottages and a public house. The manor appears in Domesday as Loventone.

== History ==
East Lavant (Loventone) was listed in the Domesday Book (1086) in the ancient hundred of Singleton as having 26 households: 15 villagers and 11 smallholders; with ploughing land, meadows and a mill, it had a value to the lord of the manor, Ralph, Archbishop of Canterbury, of £18.

In 1861 the principal landowner was The Duke of Richmond; the third duke had acquired it in 1775.

In 1851 the parish had a population of 421. On 29 September 1873 the parish was abolished and merged with West Lavant to form "Lavant".

== St Mary's Church ==
St Mary's Church was founded in the 12th century. The North aisle was added in the 13th century - one of the columns separating the nave from the north aisle remains, the others are 19th-century. The lancet window is also original. The 15th century appears to have brought the five stalls with their misericords.

The south tower was constructed in 1671 and the southwest window nave window was inserted at the same date. Most of the north aisle, the arcade between the nave and the north aisle, much of the nave and chancel seems to have been rebuilt in 1863.

In 1628, an ecclesiastical case is preserved that relates to a game of cricket being played at East Lavant on a Sunday. Two defendants, Edward Taylor and William Greentree, were charged with playing cricket at the time of evening service.

== The Royal Oak ==
This restaurant is called "The Royal Oak". It was believed to be haunted by a lady in white who appears in a front upper floor bedroom. However, her son confirmed that it was an idea by the landlord's daughter Marjorie Pafford to attract more custom. In the 1940s it drew national attention due to the famous "Drinking Pig". A local farmer used to give one of his pigs, the runt of the litter, a drink of beer to build it up. A national paper heard the story and sent a reporter. Unfortunately, the beer had worked, and the pig had been slaughtered. The resourceful farmer merely found another pig, and this appeared in the newspaper article. Thus, a fine picture of the pig and the farmer appeared in the paper, with the landlord, James Pafford and his family standing proudly behind the bar.
