= Tracer use in the oil industry =

Tracers are used in the oil industry in order to qualitatively or quantitatively gauge how fluid flows through the reservoir, as well as being a useful tool for estimating residual oil saturation. Tracers can be used in either interwell tests or single well tests. In interwell tests, the tracer is injected at one well along with the carrier fluid (water in a waterflood or gas in a gasflood) and detected at a producing well after some period of time, which can be anything from days to years. In single well tests, the tracer is injected into the formation from a well and then produced out the same well. The delay between a tracer that does not react with the formation (a conservative tracer) and one that does (a partitioning tracer) will give an indication of residual oil saturation, a piece of information that is difficult to acquire by other means.

Tracers can be radioactive or chemical, gas or liquid and have been used extensively in the oil industry and hydrology for decades.
