= Charlton, West Sussex =

Village in West Sussex, England

Coordinates: 50.90961°N 0.73719°W

Charlton
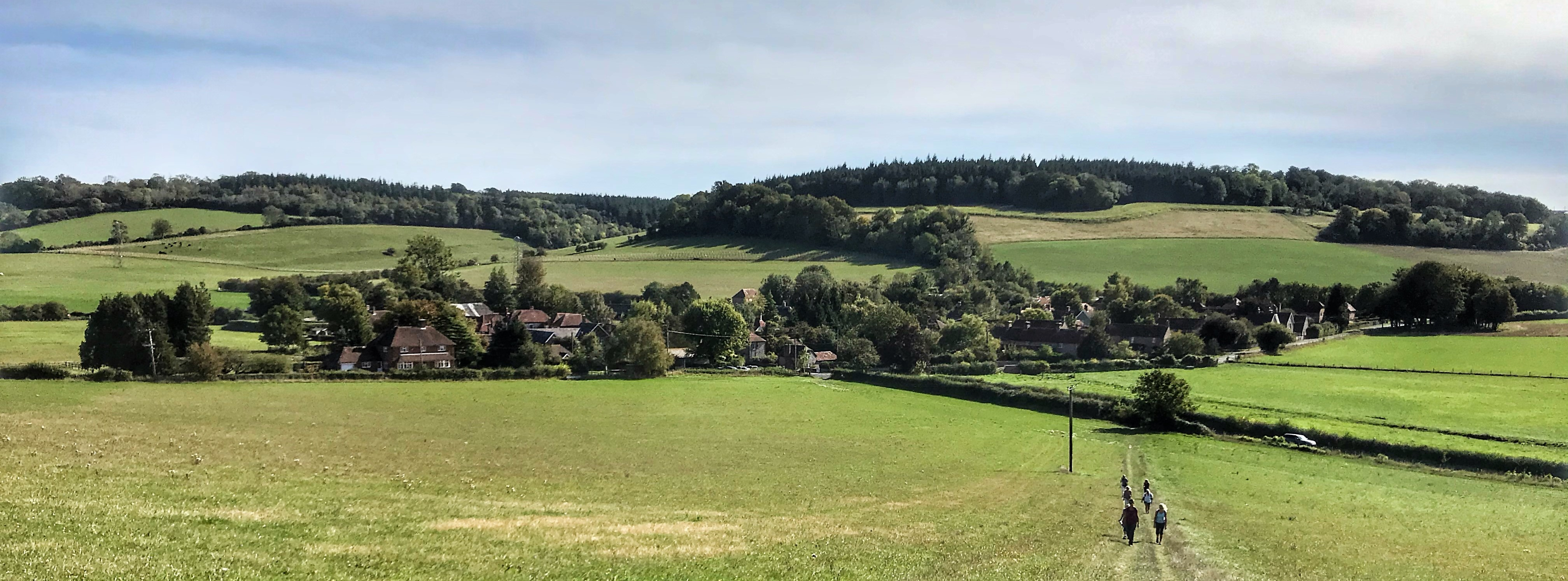
- View of Charlton from Levin Down

- Location within West Sussex
- OS grid reference: SU888130
- Civil parish: Singleton
- District: Chichester
- Shire county: West Sussex
- Region: South East
- Country: England
- Sovereign state: United Kingdom
- Post town: Chichester
- Postcode district: PO18
- Police: Sussex
- Fire: West Sussex
- Ambulance: South East Coast
- UK Parliament: Chichester

Charlton is a small village in the Chichester district of West Sussex, England. It lies on the Singleton to East Dean road 5.3 miles (8.6 km) and the River Lavant north of Chichester. At the 2011 Census the population of the hamlet was included in the civil parish of Singleton.

== Toponym ==
The name Charlton comes from "churl", meaning free peasant, and "ton", meaning settlement.

== History ==
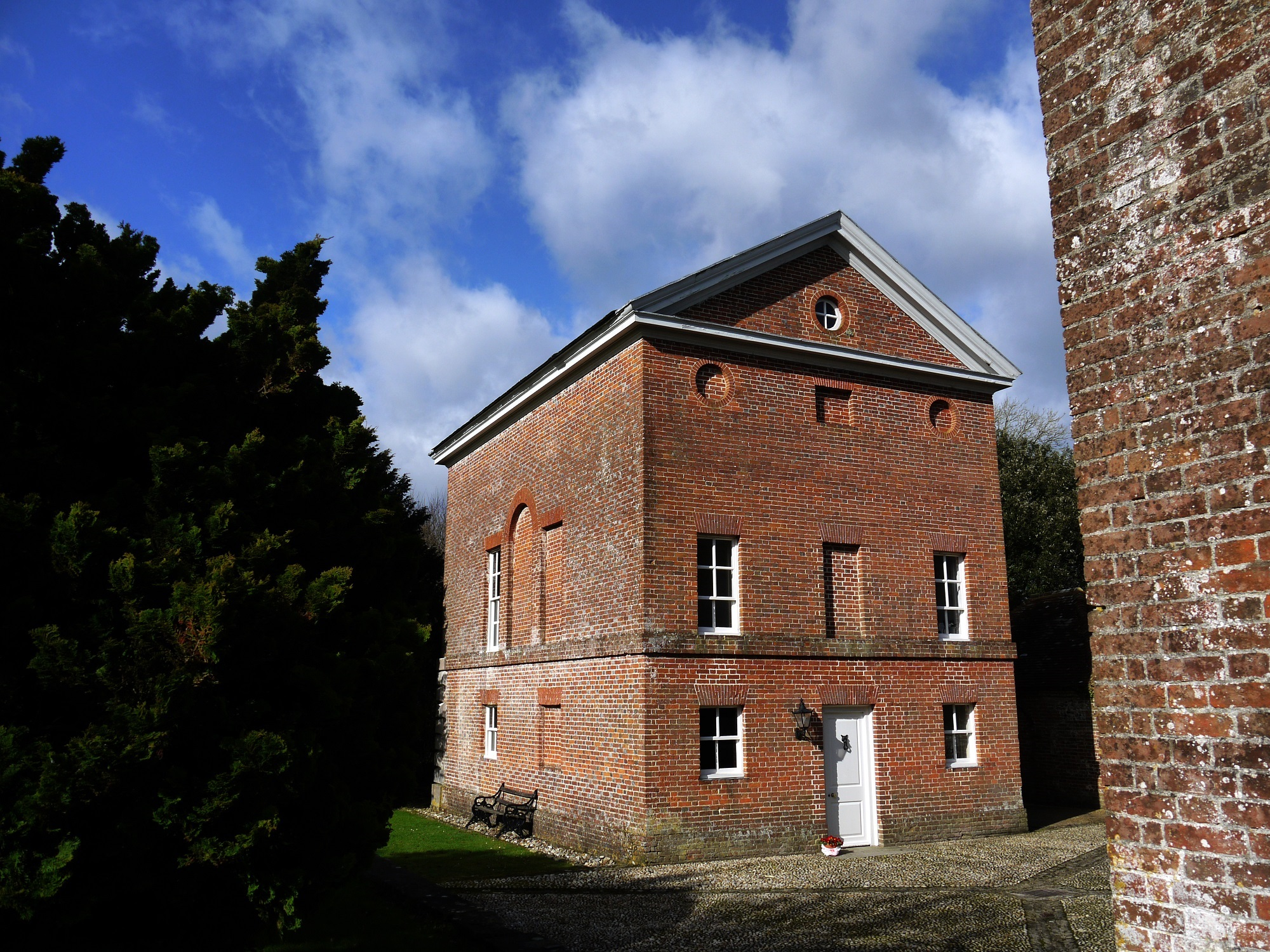
Fox Hall

In the 1670s towards the end of Charles II's reign, the Charlton Hunt was established, which would be attended by nobles across the country until the 1750s. Fox Hall, named in reference to the hunt in question, was built in 1730 on the edge of Charlton for the 2nd Duke of Richmond, designed in the Palladian style (possibly by Roger Morris, a student of Lord Burlington).

In 1915, 17th-century pub The Fox Goes Free was the venue for the first Women's Institute meeting.
