= River Lavant, West Sussex =

Winterbourne in West Sussex, England

Coordinates: 50°49′38.09″N 0°48′33.7″W

River Lavant
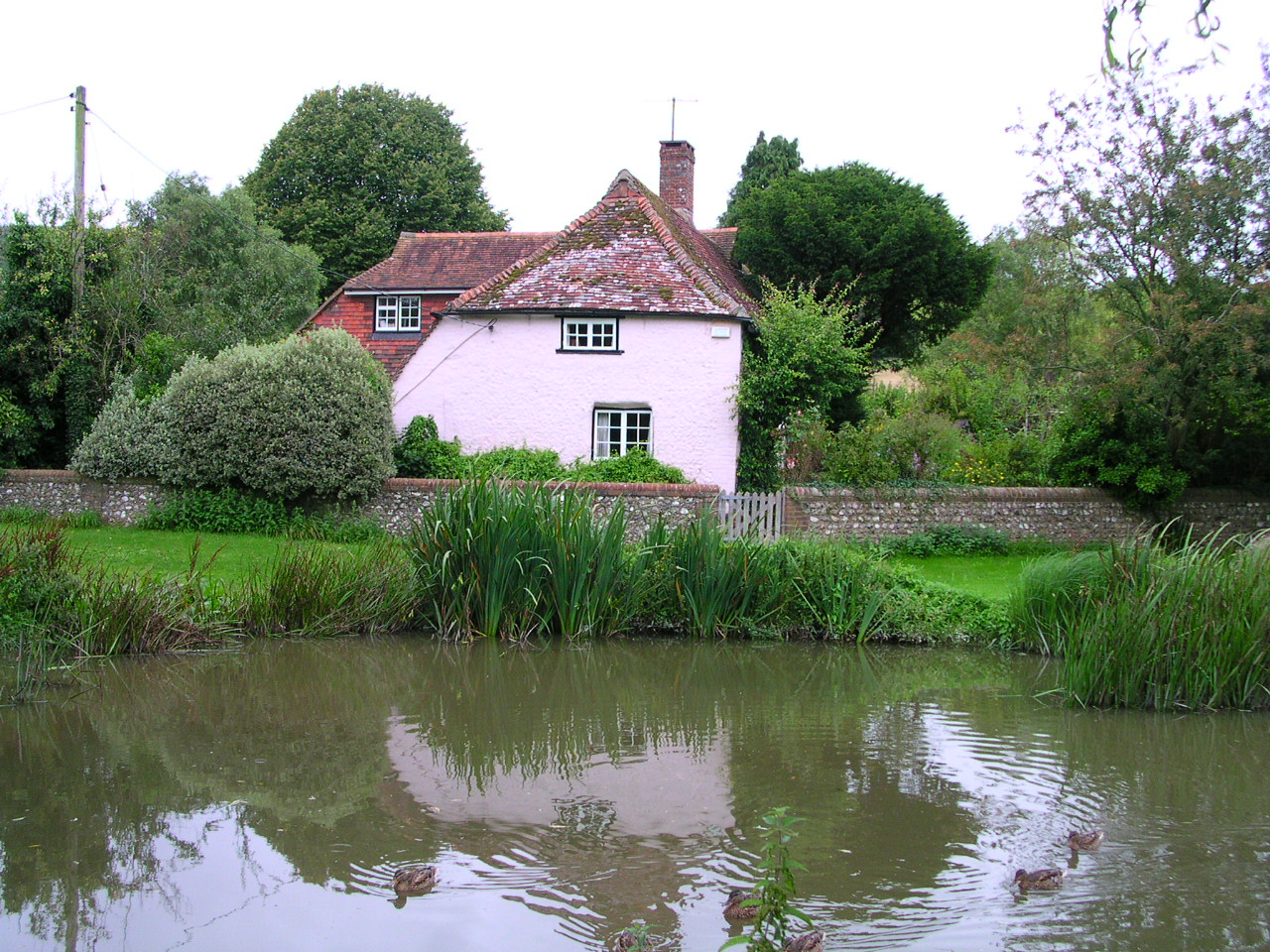
- East Dean is recognised as the source of the Lavant, springs feeding the village pond

Location
- Country: England
- Region: West Sussex

Physical characteristics
- Source: East Dean, West Sussex
  - location: West Sussex
- Mouth: Chichester Harbour
  - location: West Sussex
- Length: 14.5 km (9.0 mi)
- Discharge
  - location: Graylingwell
  - average: 0.3 m^{3}/s (11 cu ft/s)
  - minimum: 0.0 m^{3}/s (0 cu ft/s)28 December 2005
  - maximum: 7.8 m^{3}/s (280 cu ft/s)14 December 2000

The River Lavant is a chalk river winterbourne that rises at East Dean and flows west to Singleton, then south past West Dean and Lavant to Chichester. From east of Chichester its natural course was south to the sea at Pagham, but the Romans diverted it to flow around the southern walls of Chichester and then west into Chichester Harbour.

== History ==
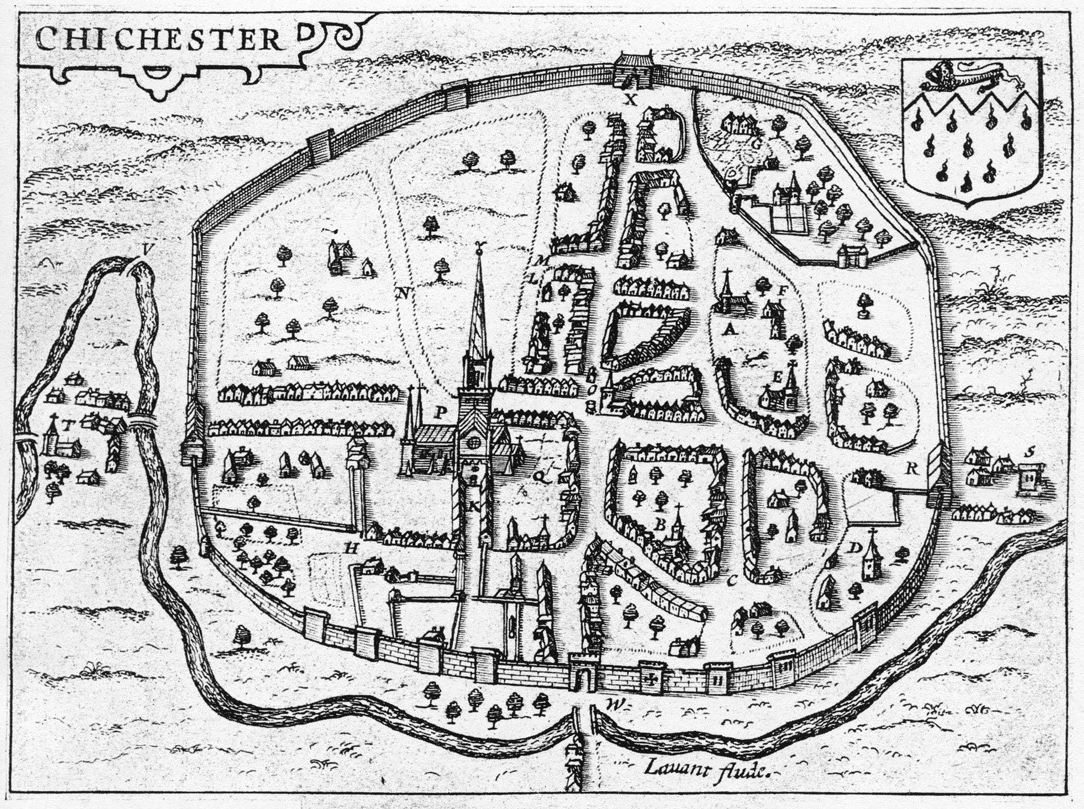
Depiction of Lavant course round Chichester from John Speed's imprecise 1610 work

The Lavant may once have had its source north of Midhurst, with the increased drainage area possibly leading to size more akin to the River Rother; however, erosion and weathering over centuries have led to its current source and size.

The Lavant's course has changed on multiple occasions, one significant instance being in Roman times when the river is believed to have been diverted through Chichester to provide drinking water for the town.

The Lavant is believed to have made its way to the sea via Pagham Rife and Pagham Harbour. Newbury notes historians have conjectured this diversion may have taken place in either Roman or medieval times, one side effect being less stress on drainage to lands to the north of Pagham.

The River Lavant is one of three designated chalk rivers in Sussex. Its name probably originated from the ancient British period but is derived from the Latin verb lābor (etymology 2), meaning 'to flow gently'. The term lavant in Hampshire and the west of Sussex is a dialect word for a stream liable to flood violently without warning.

=== Floods ===
The Lavant has been responsible for multiple flooding events throughout recent centuries, with the St Pancras area of Chichester being most typically affected. Floods were recorded in 1713, 1763, 1771, 1797, 1809, 1826, 1938 and 1960.

In January 1994 heavy rainfall caused the River Lavant to burst its banks, causing extensive flooding in Chichester and surrounding villages—the worst for 130 years—and forcing the closure of the A27 and A259 roads. Military "Green Goddess" fire engines were stationed in the city for several weeks pumping out groundwater through miles of pipes. When exceptionally high rainfall in the autumn of 2000 threatened renewed flooding of Chichester a project was led by the Environment Agency, using emergency powers to build a relief channel to divert excess water back into the natural route of Pagham Rife. This brought forward work planned for 2001, compressing it into two weeks, and was completed days before the anticipated flood surge in the River Lavant occurred. The emergency work was subsequently made into a permanent relief channel, with sluices at Westhampnett.

=== Environmental concerns ===
In the early 2020s the River Lavant became the subject of significant environmental concern due to repeated sewage discharges by Southern Water. Regional and national media reported prolonged and, at times, continuous releases of untreated wastewater into the river and its tributaries, leading to the growth of sewage fungus and severe ecological decline. Some assessments described sections of the chalk stream as “effectively dead” as a result of the pollution.

== Course ==
The Lavant rises at East Dean, in the foothills of the South Downs, approximately 9 miles (14 km) north-north-east of Chichester. At East Dean the Lavant may emerge as small springs in various gardens and roadways, and may contribute to the filling of the village pond, though at other times the river may simply begin to form as a trickle at some point alongside its course to Charlton, a village about 1 mile (1.6 km) to the west along the valley.

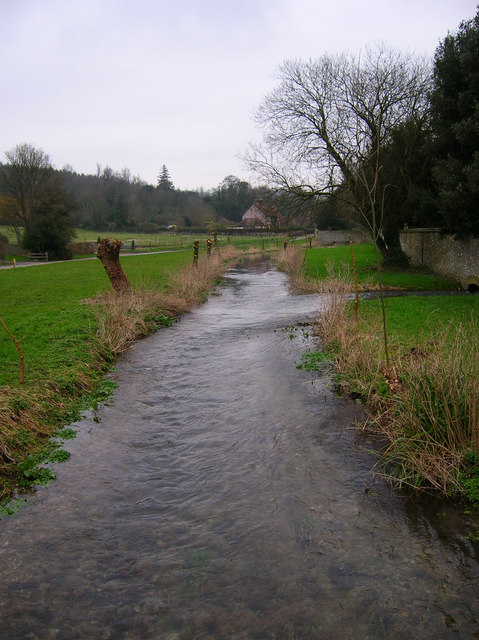
Lavant passing by West Dean estate, February 2007

The river continues east to Singleton, then curves southwards remaining a little to the east of the A286 road past West Dean and Mid-Lavant and through to East Lavant. The Lavant continues through farmland towards the former site of Westhampnett Mill, passing Summersdale and Graylingwell to the west and Goodwood airfield and racing circuit to the east. Near to site of the former mill, which is now the top end of The Barn retail park, the Lavant bifurcates, the eastern distributary taking a clockwise course to come in on the north side of the A285, the western distributary heading to join the other where Church Road meets Westhampnett Road. The meeting is now immediately after culverts constructed under Abel Smith Way, completed c. 2020.

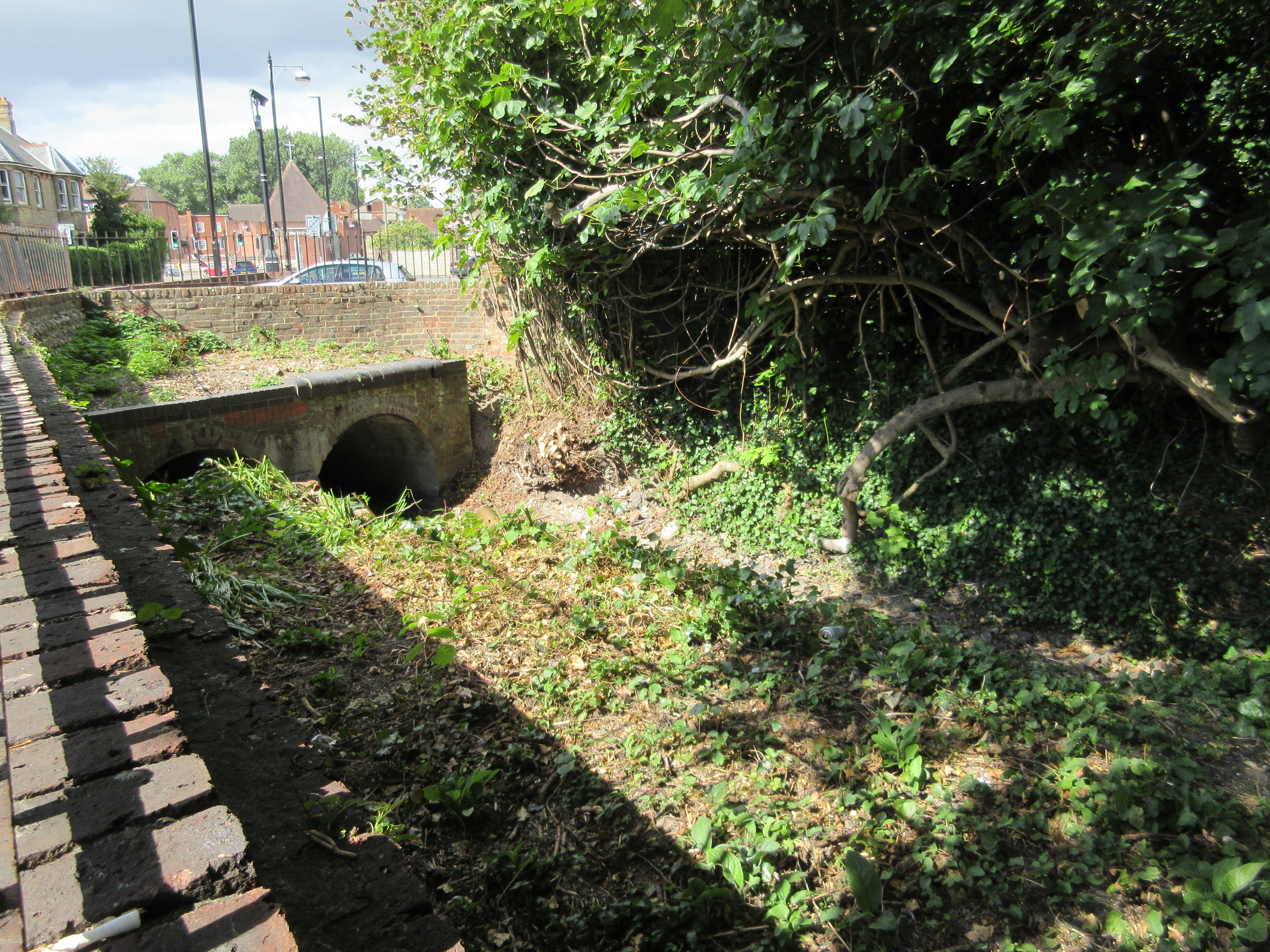
Culverts enable the Lavant to pass underground at Southgate c. overground beside Market Avenue

The Lavant continues westwards towards Chichester, crossing to the south side of the A285 at St. James Road before proceeding beside it to the Green Lane footbridge. Thereafter it runs between the A285 and A286 before it enters a long culvert starting from about middle of the A286 one way system at Hornet/St Pancras about 100 m (330 ft) from Eastgate.

The river continues in the culvert along or beside Market Road, eventually exiting the culvert in the garden of Market Walls. It flows under the former Southgate, emerging the other side of South Street, and again bifurcates. Distributaries and tributaries join south of the Chichester bypass and the Lavant outflows to Chichester Harbour past the sewerage works between Fishbourne and Apuldram.
