= East Dean, West Sussex =

Village and parish in West Sussex, England

Coordinates: 50.90853°N 0.71689°W

East Dean
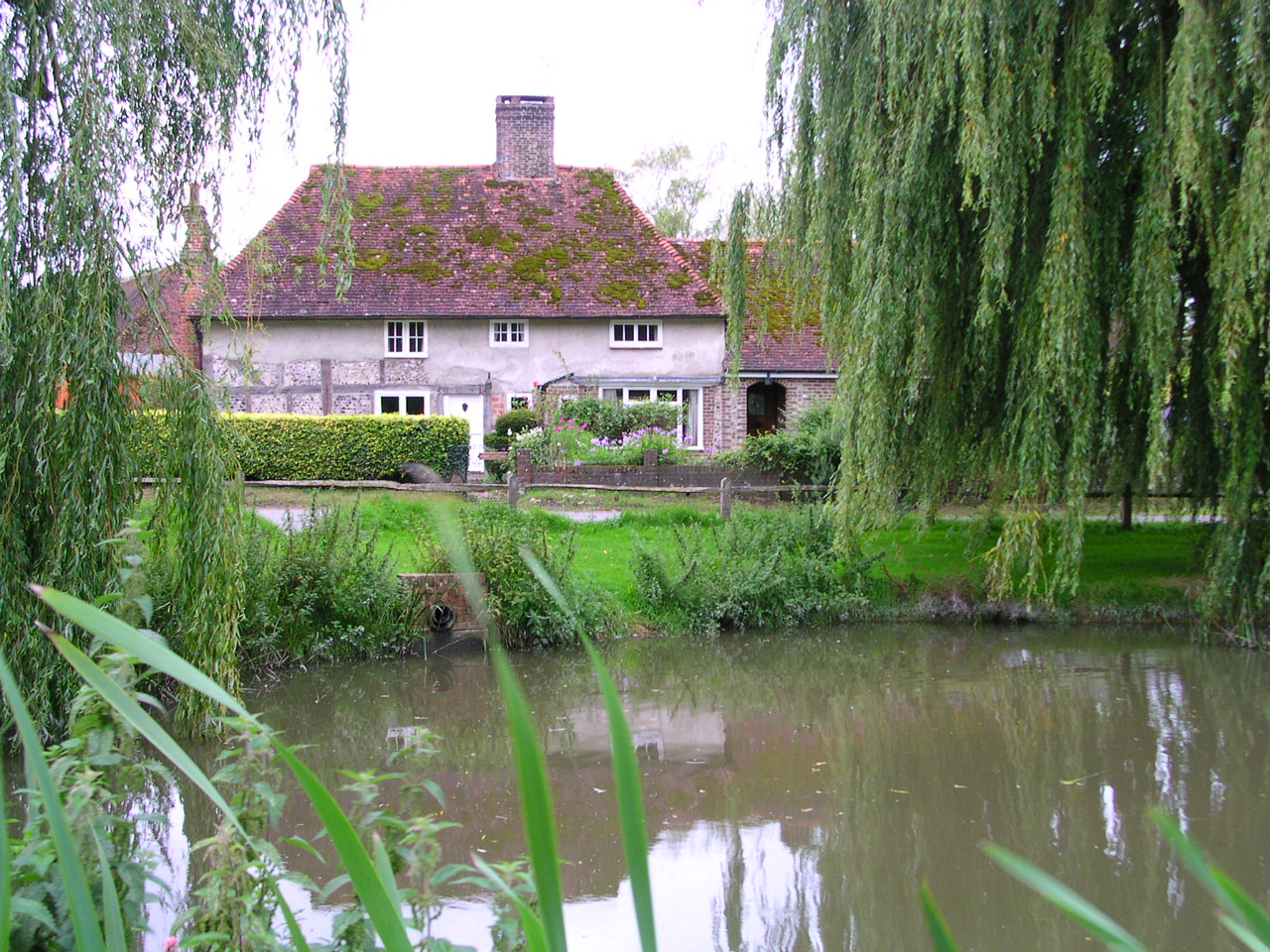
- East Dean pond

- Location within West Sussex
- Area: 16.66 km^{2} (6.43 sq mi)
- Population: 206 (2011 Census)
  - Density: 13/km^{2} (34/sq mi)
- OS grid reference: SU903129
  - London: 48 miles (77 km) NNE
- Civil parish: East Dean
- District: Chichester
- Shire county: West Sussex
- Region: South East
- Country: England
- Sovereign state: United Kingdom
- Post town: Chichester
- Postcode district: PO18
- Dialling code: 01243
- Police: Sussex
- Fire: West Sussex
- Ambulance: South East Coast
- UK Parliament: Chichester

East Dean is a village and civil parish in the District of Chichester in West Sussex, England. The village is in a valley in the South Downs, 5 1/2 miles (9 km) north-northeast of Chichester on a narrow road between Singleton on the A286 and Upwaltham on the A285 road. The village pond is considered to be the source of the River Lavant.

The civil parish is about 4 miles (6.4 km) long north – south and about 2 miles (3 km) wide east – west and has a land area of 1,663.5 hectares (4,111 acres). The 2011 census recorded the parish population as 206, living in 112 households. 101 residents were recorded as economically active.

The village has a Church of England parish church and an FIEC free church. East Dene has a village hall and a pub, The Star and Garter.

The parish church, pub and most of the houses are built of flint. The pub and many of the houses have brick quoins and window dressings. The Monarch's Way long-distance footpath crosses the parish on the downs to the south of the village. Part of the grounds of Goodwood House is in the parish.

East Dean has a football team, founded in 1880, that plays in the West Sussex Football League.

== History ==
Stone Age flint tools have been found on the downs, and there are a number of Bronze Age round barrows in the parish. The outline of Celtic field systems can still be seen on Court Hill north of the village. Roman pottery and coins have been found near the village.

In AD 689, Nunna (Nothelm), King of the South Saxons, gave 20 hides of land at "Hugabeorgum and Dene" to Eadberht, Bishop of Selsey. "Dene" has been identified as East Dene. In his will of AD 899 King Alfred the Great left East Dean to his youngest son Æthelweard (AD c. 880 – 920 or 922).

The remains of a small deserted Medieval settlement have been found in Eastdean Park. The buildings were 14th- and 16th-century.

Newhouse Farmhouse, about 2/3 mile (1 km) north of the village, is 18th-century. It is a Grade II* listed building.

The village hall used to be the parish school. Charles Lennox, 3rd Duke of Richmond had it built in 1787.

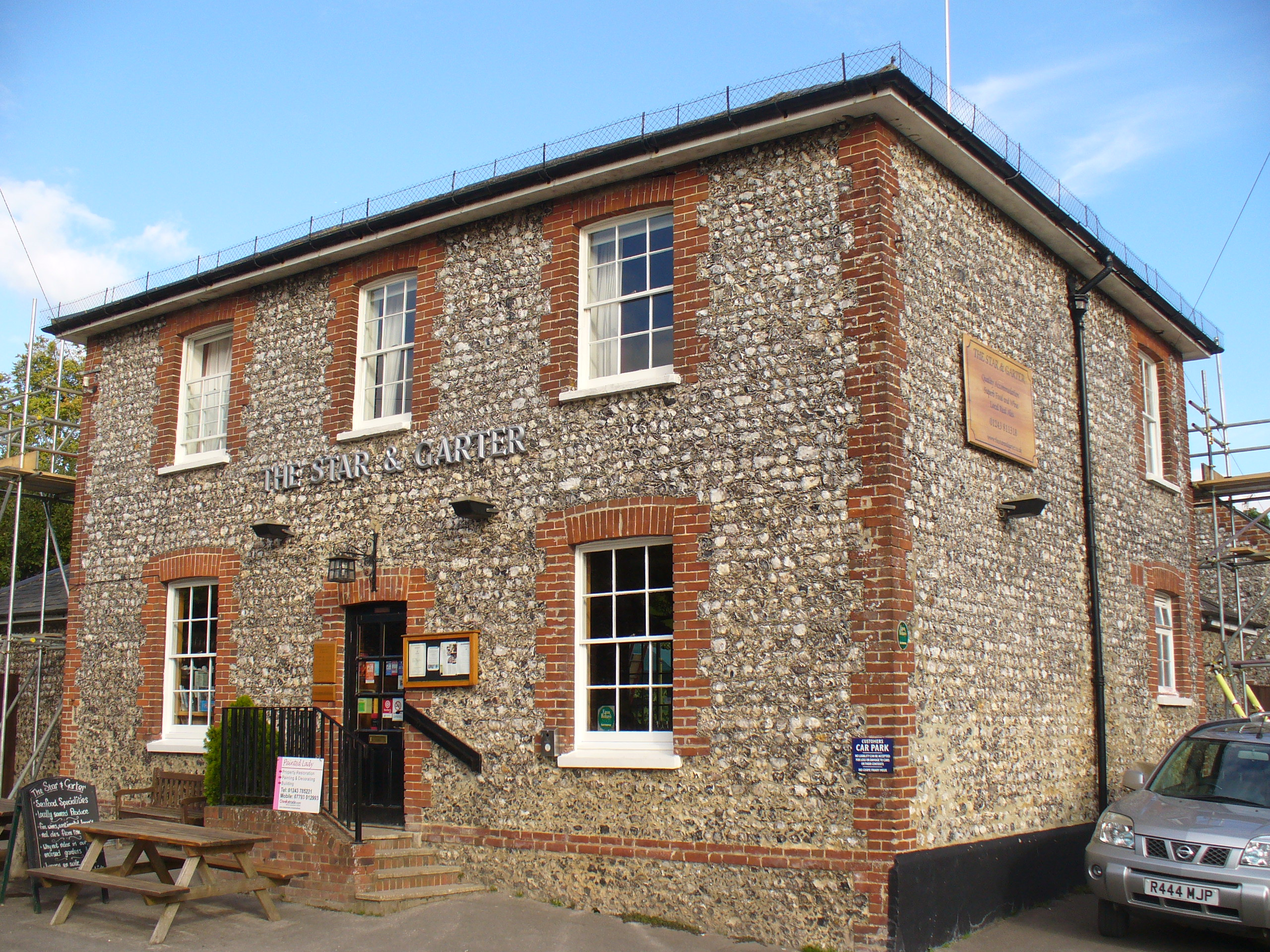
The Star and Garter pub

The Star and Garter used to be called the Hurdlemakers. It was built early in the 19th century.

In 1852 a fire destroyed eight houses and several barns in the village and left others damaged. Slate was used to replace the thatched roofs on some of these.

On 19 October 2020, the Parish Council approved a flag for the East Dean village community, designed by Edward Hilary Davis. The new community flag, representing the history of the area, was registered with the UK Flag Institute in 2021 by the Chief Vexillologist, Graham Bartram. The flag is used during village celebrations such as at the Platinum Jubilee of Elizabeth II.

== Parish church ==
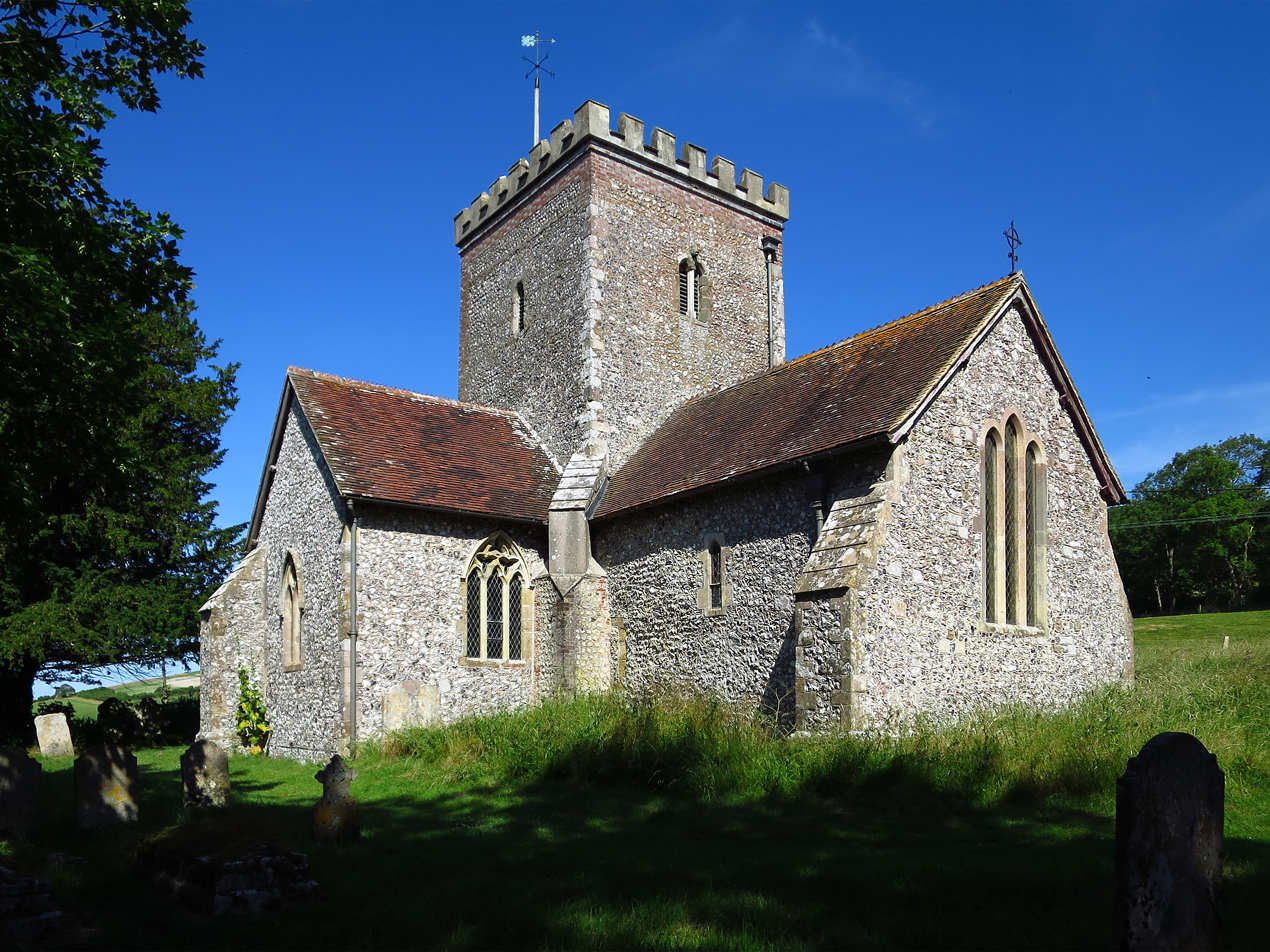
Parish church of All Saints

The parish church of All Saints is at the north end of the village. It is part of a united parish with the churches of the Blesséd Virgin Mary, Singleton and St Andrew, West Dean.

All Saints' is a cruciform church with a central tower over the crossing. The chancel, transepts and tower were built c. 1150. The south doorway was built about 1200. The nave has five bays and was built in the 13th century. Blocked arches on the north side of the nave and west side of the north transept show that it had a north aisle, which was later removed.

The tower has three bells. The oldest was cast in the 15th century, and is inscribed "HAL MARI FVL GRAS". Another was cast in 1634. Clement Tosier of Salisbury cast the youngest bell in 1702.

The church was restored in 1870. It is a Grade I listed building.

== Air crash ==
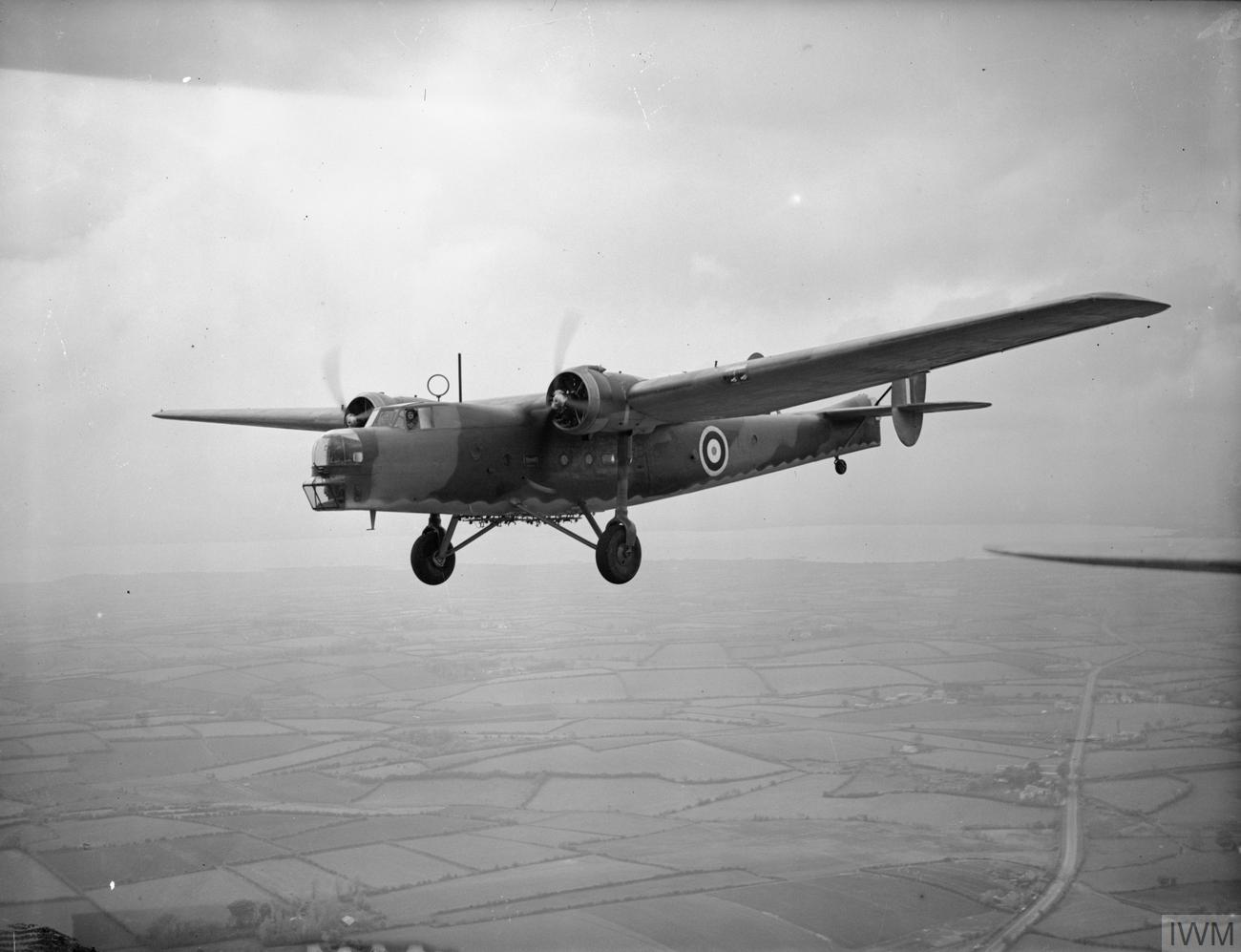
A Bristol Bombay Mk I of 216 Squadron RAF, similar to the one that crashed near East Dean

On 17 June 1940 an RAF Transport Command Bristol Bombay aircraft crashed on high ground in the parish, killing all five members of its crew. The aircraft belonged to either 216 Squadron or 271 Squadron (records differ), but all five of its crew were from 24 Squadron. The aircraft was on approach to land at its base at RAF Tangmere, but the weather was poor and the plane hit a hill near East Dean.

The aircraft may have been taking part in Operation Aerial or Operation Cycle, the evacuations of the British Expeditionary Force from Normandy and western France in the weeks after the Dunkirk evacuation.

Flying Officer Colman O'Shaughnessy Murphy (son of John J.L. Murphy and Anne Murphy, of Bray, County Wicklow, Ireland) is buried in the CWGC's Roman Catholic section in Chichester Cemetery. Pilot Officer Hedley Eric Large and the three aircraftmen/crewmen (Leonard Bradburn, Wilfred Arnol Harper, and Ernest Wragg) are interred in the parish churchyard of St Andrew, Tangmere.

== Notable residents ==
- The leading Crown official Sir William de Essendon, also called Eastdean or de Eastdene (died after 1305), Lord High Treasurer of Ireland, was born in East Dean in the middle of the 13th century and took his surname from the village.
- Playwright Christopher Fry (1907–2005) lived in East Dean in later life.

== Bibliography ==
- Nairn, Ian; Pevsner, Nikolaus (1965). Sussex. The Buildings of England. Harmondsworth: Penguin Books. pp. 213–214. ISBN 0-14-071028-0.
- Salzman, LF, ed. (1953). A History of the County of Sussex. Victoria County History. Vol. 4: The Rape of Chichester. Oxford University Press for the Institute of Historical Research. pp. 94–96. ISBN 978-0712905886 – via British History Online.
