= The Witterings (electoral division) =

Electoral division of West Sussex, United Kingdom

Coordinates: 50.78467°N 0.86277°W

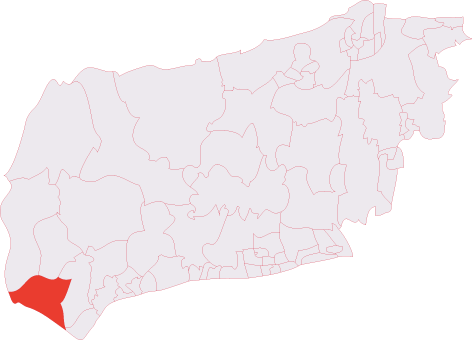
The Witterings
Shown within West Sussex
District:	Chichester
UK Parliament Constituency:	Chichester
Ceremonial county:	West Sussex
Electorate (2009):	8171
County Councillor
Pieter Montyn (Con)

The Witterings is an electoral division of West Sussex in the United Kingdom, and returns one member to sit on West Sussex County Council.

== Extent ==
The division covers the villages of Almodington, Birdham, Bracklesham, Earnley, East Wittering, Shipton Green, Somerley, West Itchenor and West Wittering.

It comprises the following Chichester District wards: East Wittering Ward and West Wittering Ward; and of the following civil parishes: Birdham, Earnley, East Wittering, West Itchenor and West Wittering.

== Election results ==
=== 2013 Election ===
Results of the election held on 2 May 2013:

The Witterings
Party	Candidate	Votes	%	±%
Conservative	Pieter Montyn	1,265	51.5	+1.9
UKIP	Roger Wilson	829	33.7	N/A
Labour	Joe O'Sullivan	214	8.7	+3.3
Liberal Democrats	Gillian Gardner	150	6.1	−4.5
Majority		436	17.8	−13.0
Turnout		2,458	29.8	−10.3
Conservative hold		Swing		

=== 2009 Election ===
Results of the election held on 4 June 2009:

The Witterings
Party	Candidate	Votes	%	±%
Conservative	Pieter Montyn	1,627	49.6	+4.3
Independent	Martin Daws-Chew	618	18.8	N/A
Liberal Democrats	Roger Tilbury	346	10.6	−8.6
Green	Adrian Mills	292	8.9	N/A
BNP	Sylvia Trower	220	6.7	N/A
Labour	Joe O'Sullivan	176	5.4	−6.8
Majority		1,009	30.8	+4.7
Turnout		3,279	40.1	−26.2
Conservative hold		Swing		

=== 2005 Election ===
Results of the election held on 5 May 2005:

The Witterings
Party	Candidate	Votes	%	±%
Conservative	John Daws-Chew	2,339	45.3	
Liberal Democrats	Alan Wells	993	19.2	
Independent	Robert Norris	755	14.6	
Labour	Patrick O'Sullivan	632	12.2	
UKIP	Roger Wilson	450	8.7	
Majority		1,346	26.1	
Turnout		5,169	66.3	
Conservative win (new seat)				
