= St Nicholas Church, West Itchenor =

St. Nicholas Church, West Itchenor
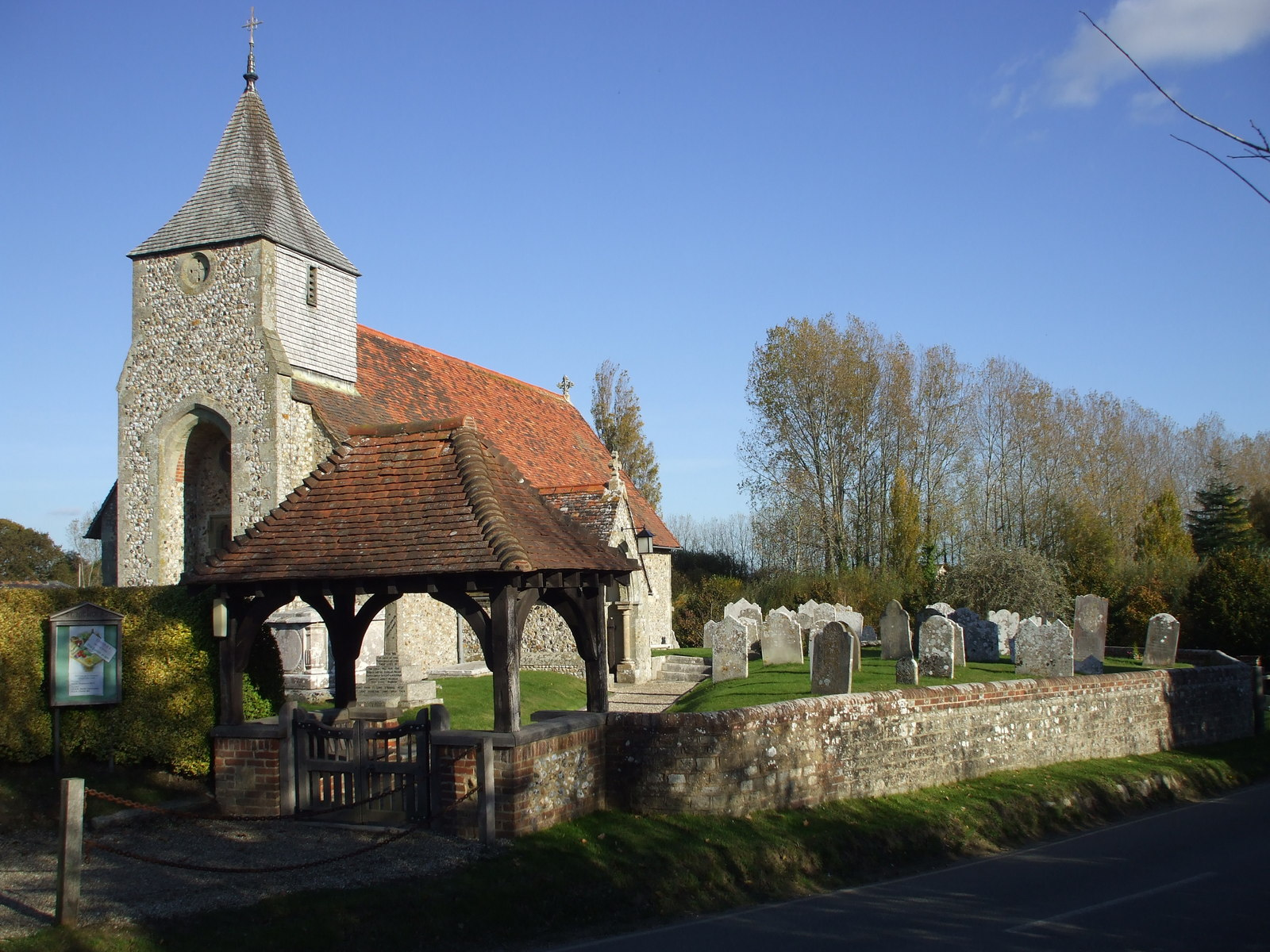
- St. Nicholas Church
- St. Nicholas Church, West Itchenor
- 50.7999°N 0.8665°W
- Location: West Itchenor
- Country: England
- Denomination: Anglican
- Website: chichesterharbourchurches.org

History
- Founded: c.1175
- Founder: Hugh Esturmy
- Dedication: Saint Nicholas

Administration
- Province: Canterbury
- Diocese: Chichester
- Archdeaconry: Archdeaconry of Chichester
- Deanery: Rural Deanery of Chichester
- Parish: West Itchenor

Clergy
- Archbishop: Most Revd Justin Welby
- Bishop: Rt Revd Martin Warner
- Rector: Revd Jonathan Swindells

St. Nicholas Church is the Anglican parish church of West Itchenor, a village in the Chichester district of West Sussex, United Kingdom. It is dedicated to Saint Nicholas.

== History ==
In around 1175 Hugh Esturmy was given permission by the Bishop of Chichester John of Greenford and the Prebendary of Wightring to build a chapel in Itchenor. Between 1180 and 1197 Bishop Seffrid II allowed the chapel to be converted into a little parish church with its own graveyard. In 1935 the Parish of Itchenor was united with the Parish of Birdham as a single benefice. In 1986 the benefice of Itchenor and Birdham was united with the Parish of West Wittering. From there after the Vicar of West Wittering was made the Rector of the Benefice of West Wittering and Birdham with Itchenor, which is what the benefice is known as today.

== Music ==
The annals of the village indicate that string or wind instruments would have been used to accompany the singing prior to 1862. From 1862 church music at St. Nicholas developed: a harmonium was purchased in 1870 to take place of the string and wind instruments, and in 1922 a small pipe organ was acquired. The next step forward came in 1950 when a new electric blower was installed. In 1956 the building of a vestry forced the ageing 34 year-old pipe organ to be moved. Due to its poor state, the organist of the church Margot Linton-Bogle, donated a small reed organ which was installed at the West end of the church. In 1961 Linton-Bogle donated a Jennings electronic organ. The organ was moved onto the newly built gallery in 1964 (the site where the current organ stands today). In 1970 the organ's maintenance caused difficulties and Linton-Bogle donated a Compton pipe organ. It wasn't until 1994 when the new organist Margaret Thomas donated the Viscount organ which is in use today.

Currently there are three bells: The Treble, The Second and The Tenor. The Treble dates from 1530 whilst both The Second and The Tenor are from the seventeenth century. The bells were re-hung in 1988 by Whitechapel Bell Foundry. Ellacombe apparatus was installed, allowing the bells to either be swing chimed or hand chimed. The church bells chime before services, before and/or after weddings and funerals. The bells are usually rung by the churchwardens.

== Rectors ==
The Old Rectory

- 1363 Roger Lyndon
- 1363 Robert de Brendbirgthen
- 1415 Richard Estan
- 1415 John Seyll
- 1438 Richard atte Okes
- 1438 Thomas Hogge
- 1502 Robert Kirkelond
- 1502 William Prestall
- 1527 Robert Kisleive
- 1541 Robert Frost
- 1541 Thomas Hewetson
- 1550 John Spyncke
- 1555 Stephen Parker
- 1556 Oliver Chype
- 1561 Thomas Secker
- 1598 Philip Timmins
- 1599 Roger Smith
- 1613 Robert Meakon
- 1615 Thomas Smith
- 1616 John Cartwright
- 1625 Robert Johnson
- 1640 John Knight
- 1662 William Sergeant
- 1674 John Radford
- 1676 Humphrey Day
- 1699 Thomas Kelway
- 1722 Robert Hulbert
- 1735 Thomas Darwent
- 1736 John Marewood
- 1771 Thomas Sampson
- 1800 William Williams
- 1825 Robert Tredcroft
- 1847 Stenning Johnson
- 1865 Alfred Fuller
- 1879 George Heath
- 1902 Francis Haines
- 1916 Albert Tansey
- 1934 Victor Dunphy
- 1952 Maurice Elliott
- 1955 R. Wright
- 1968 Roy Goodchild
- 1974 John Stewnette
- 1976 Philip Barry
- 1981 Kenneth Woolhouse
- 1986 Trevor Smyth
- 1994 John Williams
- 2012 Jonathan Swindells

== See also ==
- Grade I listed buildings in West Sussex
- List of current places of worship in Chichester (district)
