= East Wittering =

Village in West Sussex, England

Coordinates: 50.76942°N 0.87377°W

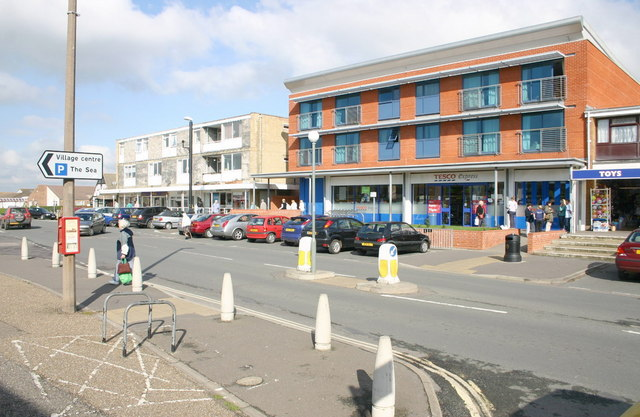
- East Wittering shops

- Location within West Sussex
- Population: 4,658 (2011.Civil Parish)
- OS grid reference: SZ795972
  - London: 60 miles (97 km) NNE
- Civil parish: East Wittering
- District: Chichester
- Shire county: West Sussex
- Region: South East
- Country: England
- Sovereign state: United Kingdom
- Post town: CHICHESTER
- Postcode district: PO20
- Dialling code: 01243
- Police: Sussex
- Fire: West Sussex
- Ambulance: South East Coast
- UK Parliament: Chichester
- Website: http://www.ewbpc.org.uk/

East Wittering is a large coastal village in the Chichester district of West Sussex, England. The majority of the village lies within the civil parish of East Wittering and Bracklesham, while the western edge lies within the boundary of West Wittering civil parish. The village sits on the B2179 road 7 miles (11 km) southwest of Chichester, on the Manhood Peninsula.

== History ==
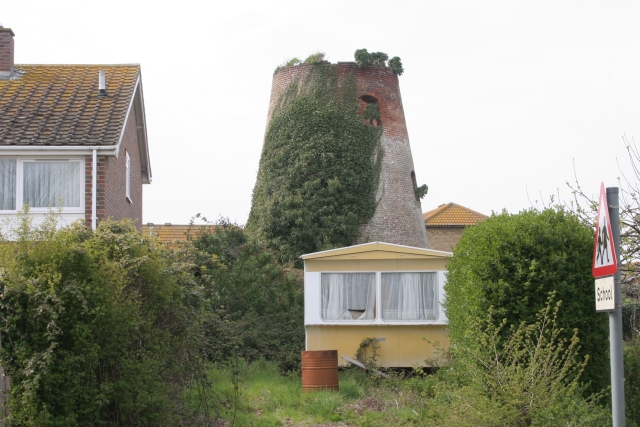
East Wittering Windmill

There has been a settlement at East Wittering for over a thousand years. The Witterings were included in a grant of land to Bishop Wilfrid in the late 7th century. The Witterings together with Sidlesham were rated as 36 hides at the time of Edward the Confessor.

Wittering is mentioned in the Domesday Book of 1086 along with Somerley, Itchenor and Birdham in the ancient Hundred of Westringes (later Manhood). The ancient hundreds generally took their names from the location of their meetings; by the middle of the 12th century East Wittering was within the unified Hundred of 'la Manwode', i.e. 'the common wood'.

For centuries the manor of East Wittering was in the hands of the Wystryng family, who took their name from the place.

The former 12th-century Anglican parish Church of the Assumption of St Mary the Virgin, has been replaced by the more modern St Anne's Church. St Anne's was built in the village centre during the 1950s, and the old church declared redundant in 1983.

In Victorian times the RNLI raised enough subscriptions to launch a distress boat from the beach at East Wittering, a role now covered by the Fire Service. Last century the area began to attract greater numbers of holiday makers but in May 1944 it became the landing beach for the 3rd Canadian Infantry Division during a dummy run for D-Day, code named Operation Fabius.

Since then it has returned to a quiet area with a small primary school, popular with week-end surfers. Nikolaus Pevsner described the village as "a jumble of bungalows and chalets near the beach in an untidy half grown up state". St Anne's Anglican Church was designed by architect Harry Sherwood who was surveyor of the fabric of Chichester Cathedral. The foundation stone was laid on 6 June 1958. The Bishop of Chichester consecrated the church on 14 May 1959. There is a plaque inside with the inscription:

1914–1918 No lives were lost from this Parish. All returned safely. LAUS DEO (Note: Laus deo - praise to god)

This testifies that East Wittering is one of the Thankful Villages – those very rare places that suffered no fatalities during the Great War of 1914–1918. The village is featured on Darren Hayman's album, Thankful Villages Volume 3.

== Economy and Retail ==
East Wittering has a successful high street with butchers, greengrocers, bakers, a fishmonger and a florist, as well as over twelve independent restaurants and cafés.. The local shop Shore Watersports has become one of the online "UK's Premier Watersports Specialist", according to The Great Sussex Way. There are many holiday caravan parks in the area which support extensive local tourism.

== Surfing ==
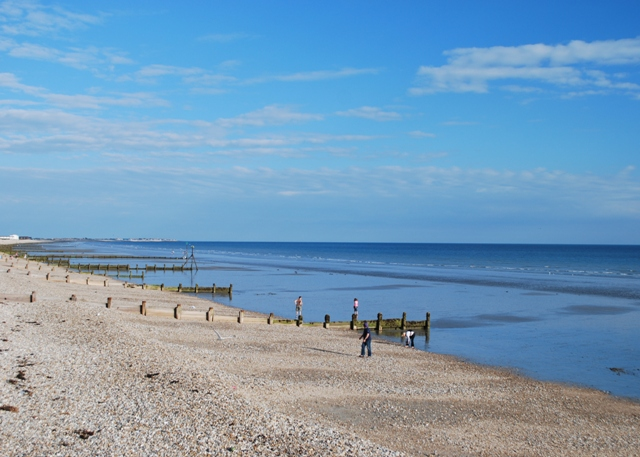
East Wittering beach

The whole stretch of Bracklesham Bay is popular with many surfers. With a low beach gradient and no obvious dangers such as rips or obstacles, it is considered to be a suitable beach for learners and is home to Shore Surf Club.

== Governance ==
An electoral ward of the same name exists. The ward includes surrounding areas. At the 2011 census it had a total ward population of 5,117.

== Landmarks ==
- A war memorial on the eastern junction of the B2179 road and Cakeham road includes reference to East Wittering as a Thankful Village on the north west face. This £25,000 memorial replaced an earlier smaller one from an unveiling ceremony led by Bishop of Horsham in September 2015.

== Transport ==
East Wittering is most directly reached via the A286 road from Chichester to Birdham followed by the B2198 road to Bracklesham before taking the B2179 road. Alternatively the B2179 can be taken in the opposite direction from Birdham for a slightly longer route via West Wittering. The B2179 road skirts the centre of the village which lies on Cakeham Road.

East Wittering is served by a high frequency bus service from Chichester and Birdham passing alternatively clockwise and counter-clockwise round the Birdham, Bracklesham, East Wittering and West Wittering road loop formed by the B2198 and B2179 roads.
