= St James' Church, Birdham =

St. James' Church, Birdham
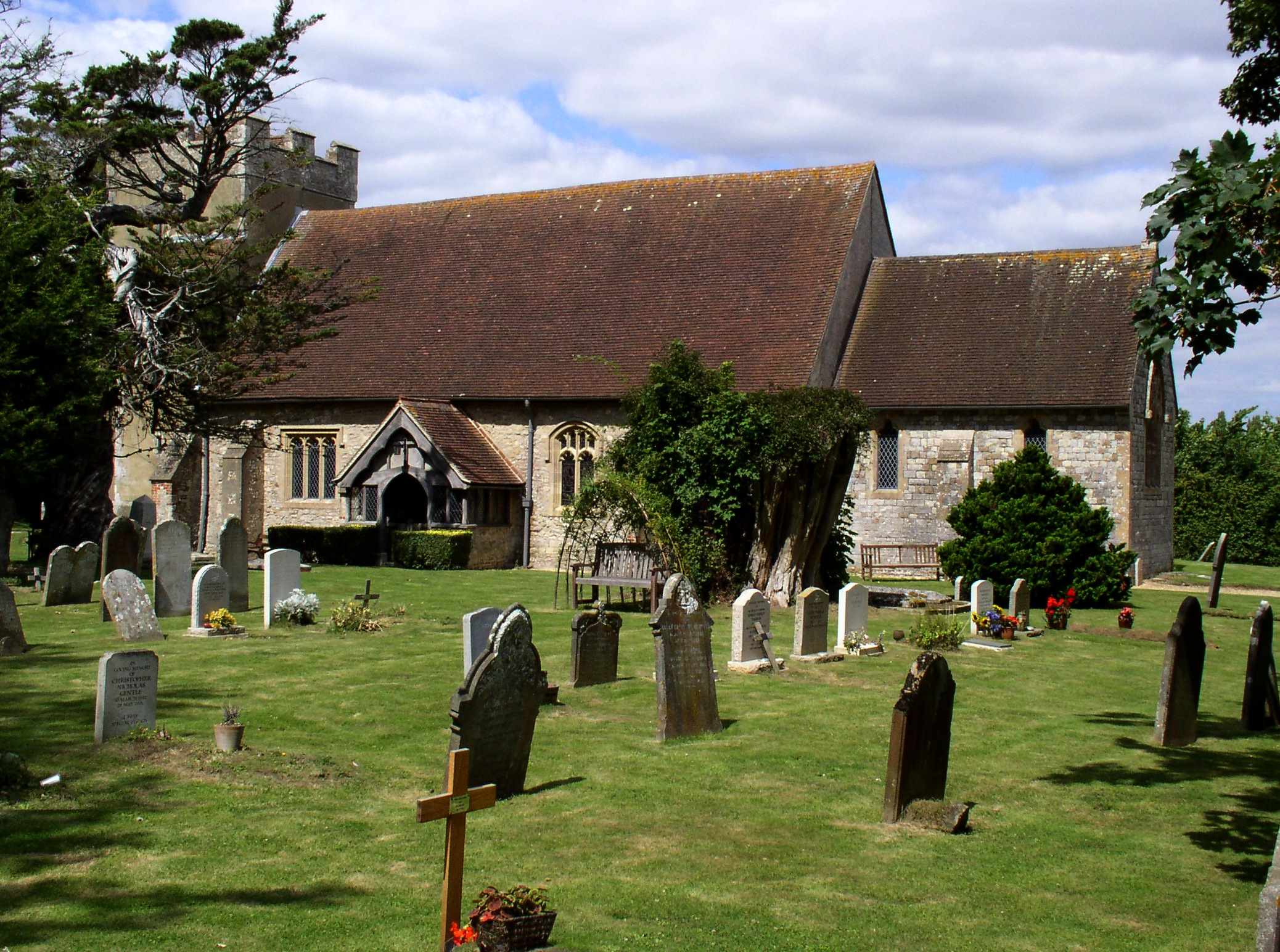
- St. James' Church, Birdham
- St. James' Church, Birdham
- 50.796559°N 0.832566°W
- Location: Birdham
- Country: England
- Denomination: Anglican
- Website: chichesterharbourchurches.org

History
- Dedication: St. James

Administration
- Province: Canterbury
- Diocese: Chichester
- Archdeaconry: Archdeaconry of Chichester
- Deanery: Rural Deanery of Chichester
- Parish: St James, Birdham with St Nicholas West Itchenor

Clergy
- Archbishop: Most Revd Justin Welby
- Bishop: Rt Revd Martin Warner
- Rector: Revd Jonathan Reid Swindells

The parish church of St James, Birdham is situated on the Manhood Peninsula in Sussex. The area is a suburban extension of the city of Chichester, popular as a place to live and visit from its nearness to the city, Chichester Harbour and marina. The church was heavily restored in the nineteenth century, the then existing chancel being entirely replaced and the nave windows renewed. The sixteenth-century tower remains. The church has a grade 1 listing.

== History ==
The earliest parts of the church, in the nave, can be definitely dated to the fourteenth century, but some parts may be older. A tower was added in the sixteenth century. The chancel is nineteenth century. The church was restored in 1863 and 1882–83 by G.M. Hills. Architectural historian Ian Nairn says that the impression left by the restoration is "terrifyingly harsh".

== Architecture ==
The church consists of a nave, with a south porch, chancel and tower. The nave is in three bays, marked on the outside by buttresses. The inner stonework of the windows dates from the Victorian restoration. The window in the second bay on the north has some ancient exterior stonework remaining. The squat tower is rendered and has diagonal buttresses. It was built around 1545, but an earlier tower may have been either planned or actually built. The evidence for this is in the sixteenth century Perpendicular style tower arch which sits on apparently fourteenth century shafts which are too small for it, leading to an awkward appearance. The chancel dates entirely from the restoration of 1863. It has fourteenth century style windows and a buttress in the middle of the north and south walls. The chancel arch is fourteenth century.

== Fittings and bells ==
The plain octagonal font was installed in 1883. The banner, with scenes from the lives of Sussex saints, was designed by Yvonne Hudson and worked by the ladies of the church. The modern east window shows the gospel story of the miraculous catch of fish with Chichester Cathedral in the background. It was made by M.C.F. Bell in 1978. There are a fourteenth-century bell, inscribed "IOHANES" and one with the name William Hunneman and the date 1695.

== Images ==
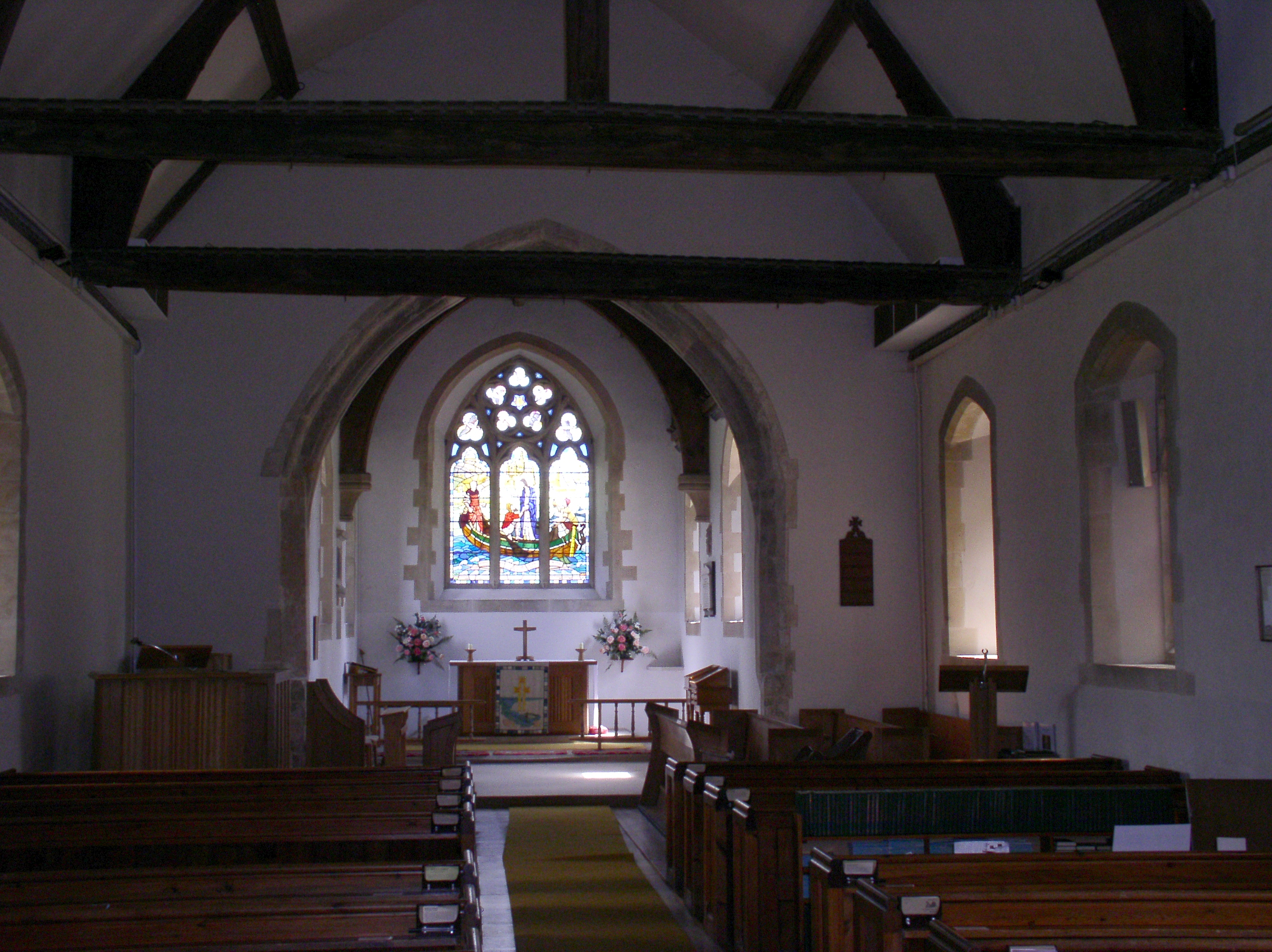
The nave looking east.

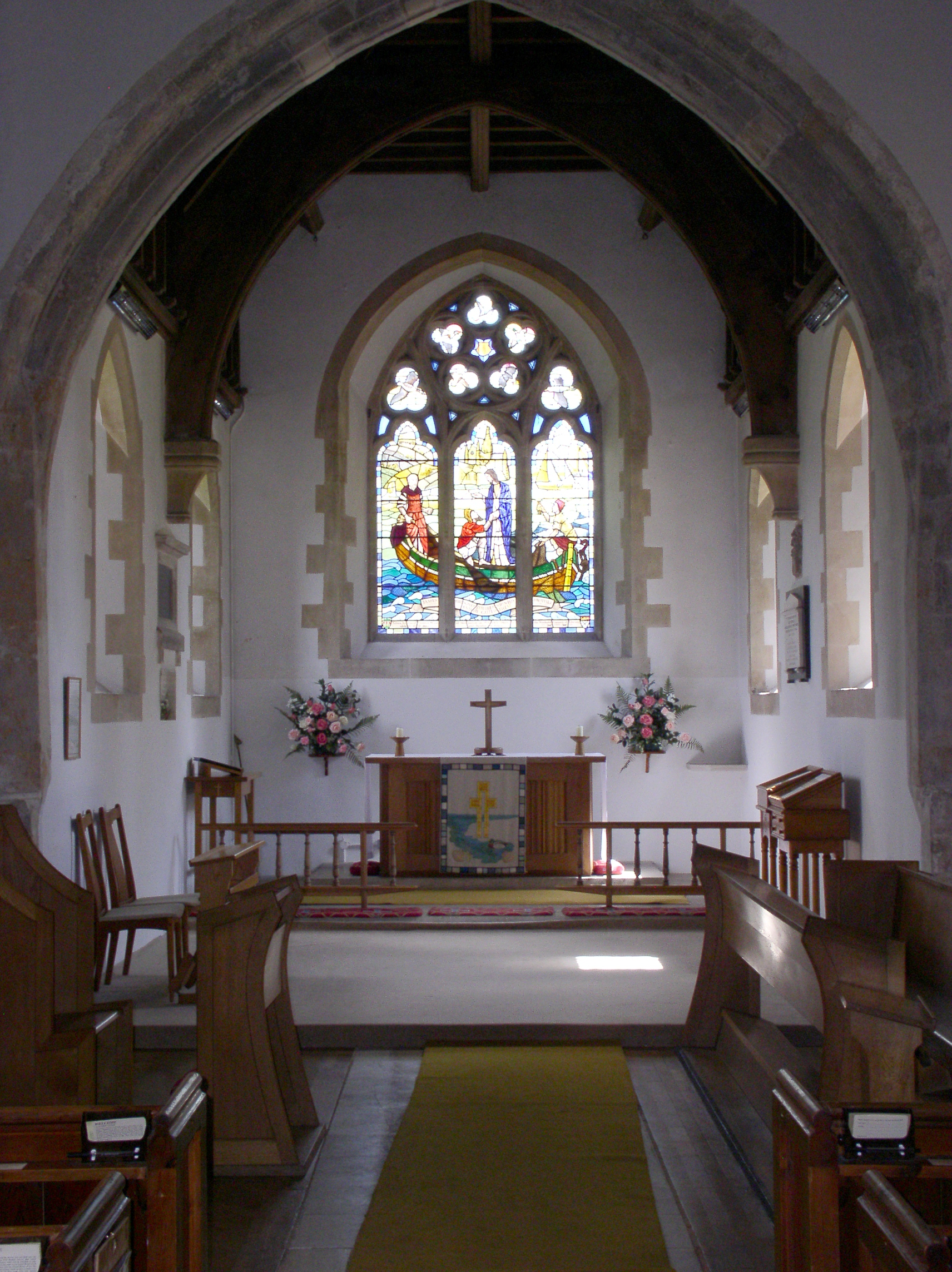
The chancel.

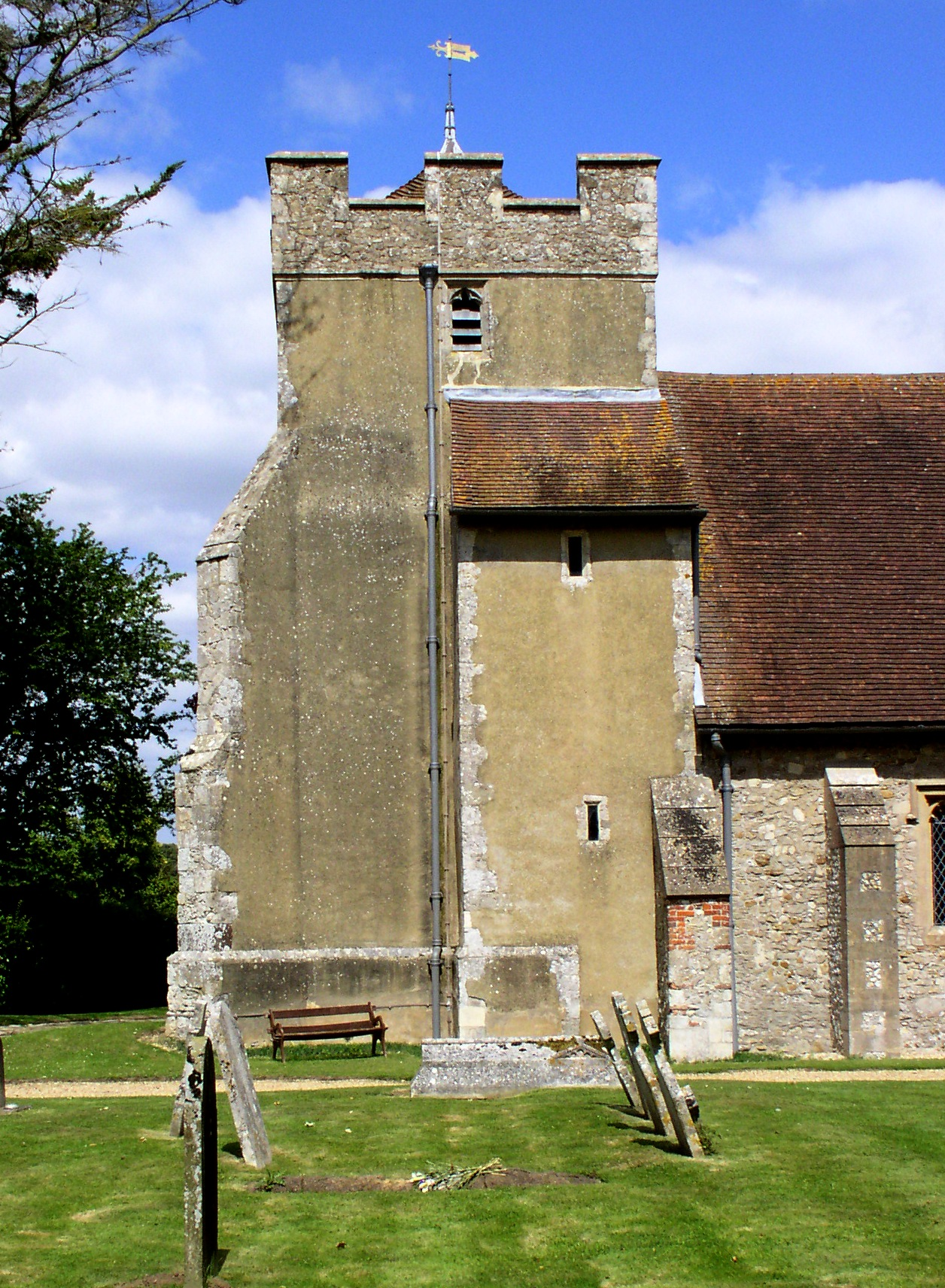
The tower of St James' Church.

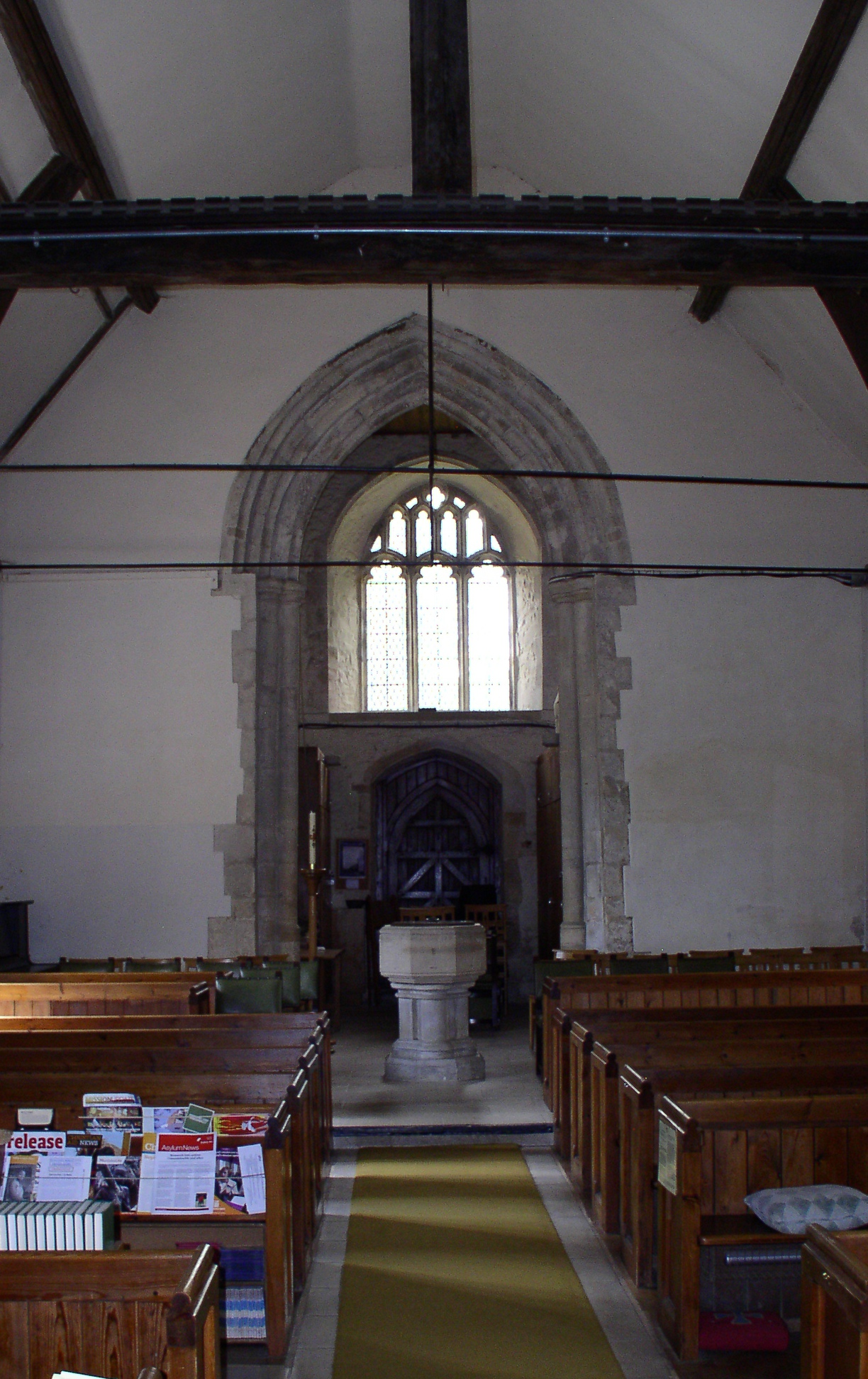
The nave looking west showing the discontinuity in the building of the tower arch.

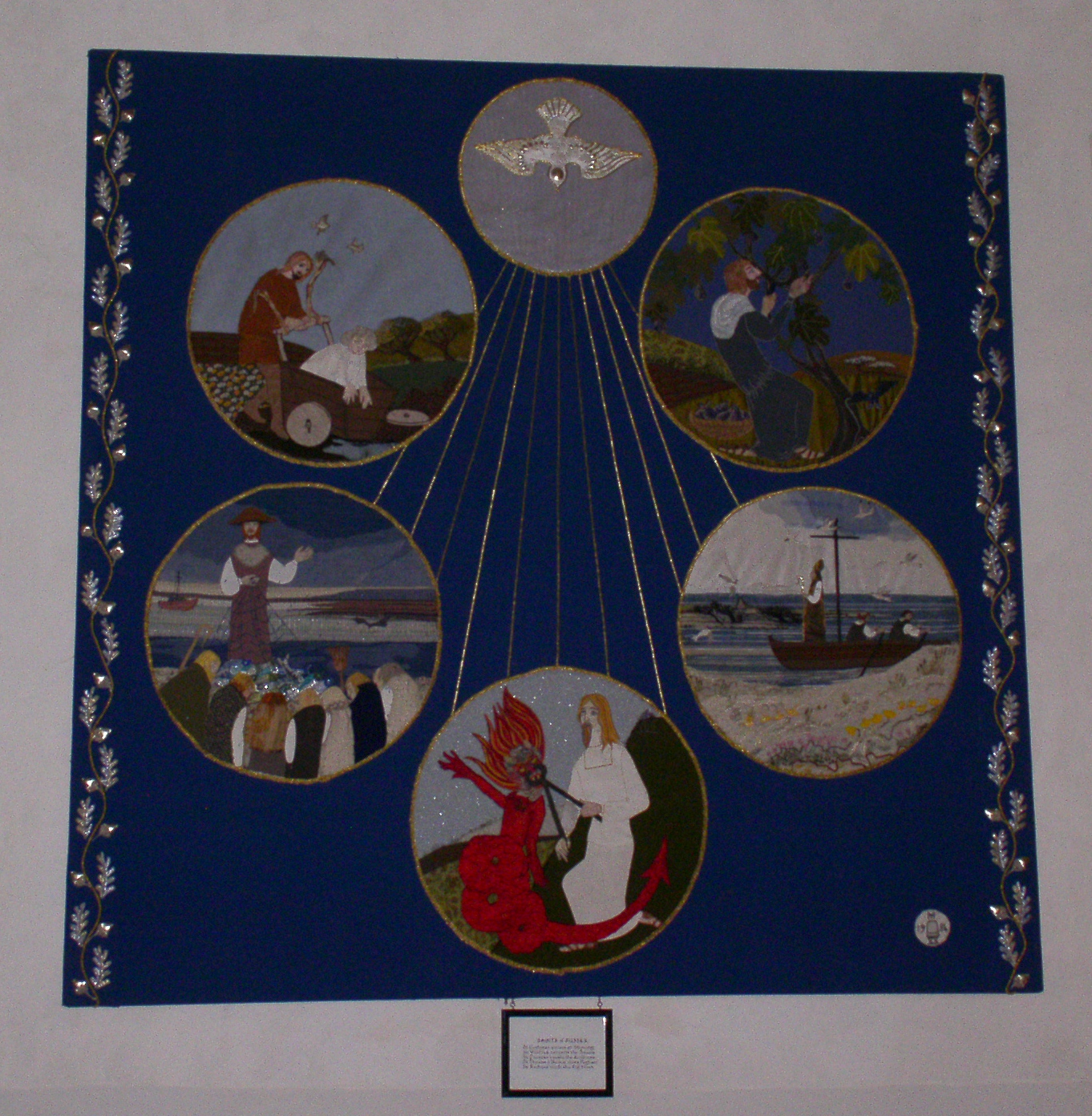
St James' Church – banner with pictures of Sussex saints.

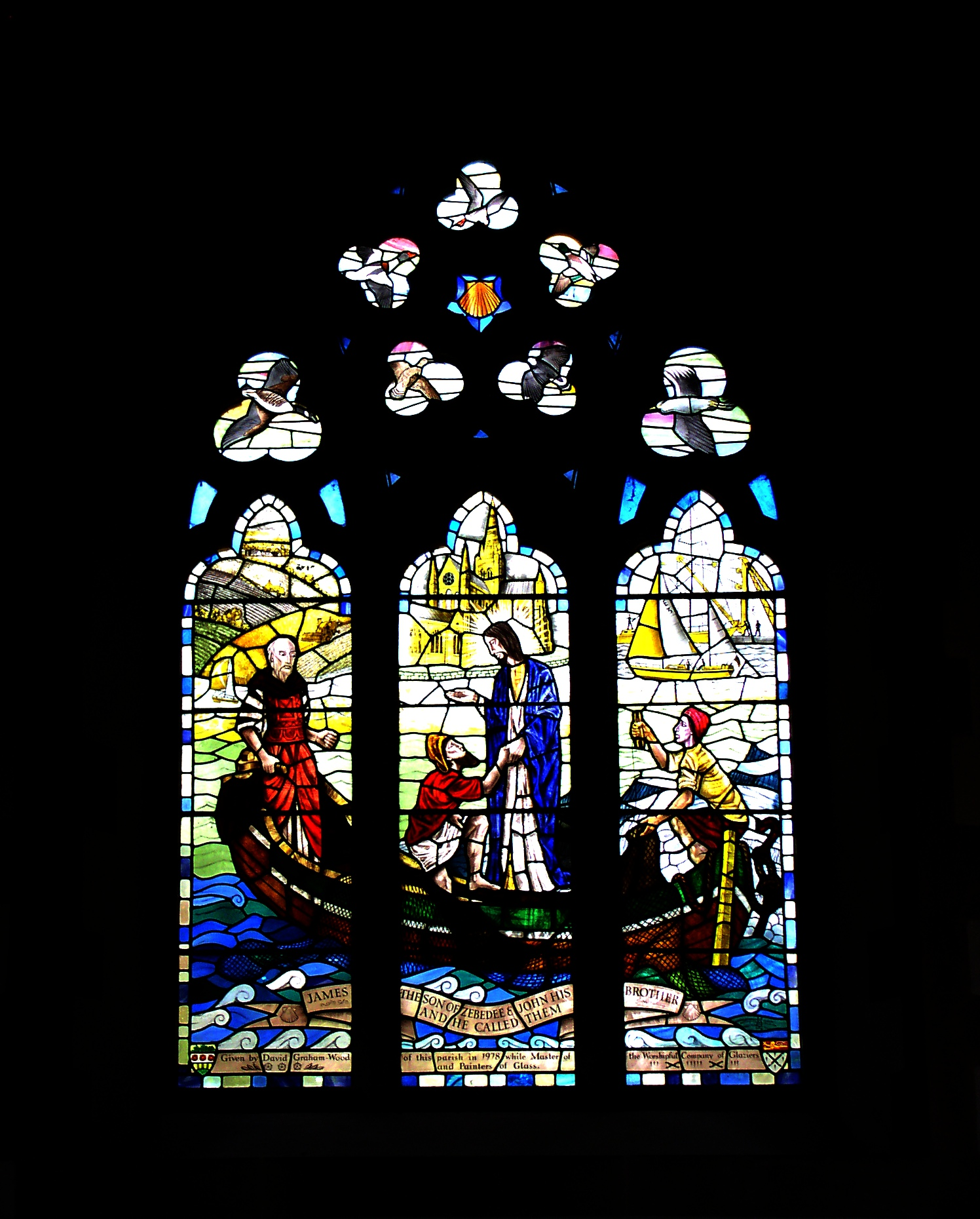
The east window depicting the miraculous catch of fish – Luke 5:1–11.

== See also ==
- List of current places of worship in Chichester (district)

== Bibliography ==
- Allen, John (2010), Sussex Parish Churches – Birdham – St James
- Salzman, L.F., ed. (1953). "Birdham". A History of the County of Sussex: Volume 4: The Rape of Chichester. Institute of Historical Research.
- Nairn, Ian; Pevsner, Nikolaus (1965). The Buildings of England: Sussex. Harmondsworth: Penguin Books. ISBN 0-14-071028-0.
