= Carolyn Cobbold =

Activist for sustainable coastal defences

Carolyn Cobbold is co-founder and leader of the Manhood Peninsula Partnership, located near Chichester, UK that has been responsible for the largest coastal realignment project in Europe that protects a town, other buildings and new wetlands.

== Career ==
Carolyn Ann Cobbold worked for around 25 years as a journalist specialising in risk management after a degree in mechanical engineering from Imperial College, London. In 2008 she returned to study at Imperial College London and gained B.Sc. and M.Sc. degrees in history of science. She then began research in the history of science and was awarded a PhD by Cambridge University in 2016. In 2017 she was invited to be a research fellow at Clare Hall, Cambridge University. Her research interests are science and food in the nineteenth and twentieth centuries.

In the mid-1990s Cobbold became involved in protecting the Manhood Peninsula near Chichester in southern England from flooding following a chance meeting with a Dutch spatial planner when they were both living near Chichester. At the time there was no co-ordination of planning for flood management, coastal defences and new house building. She led advocacy for local residents, businesses, councils and the Environment Agency to work together. She was involved in organising a one-week workshop in 2001 that brought representatives of local residents and British organisations together with planners, water and coastal engineers and ecologists from the Netherlands. This led to formation of the Manhood Peninsula Partnership. Cobbold was a co-founder and then volunteered as the partnership's Project Officer from 2001 onwards. The partnership worked on a comprehensive plan for sustainable development in the region that included adaptation to climate change, developed initially within the ESPACE Partnership and part-funded by the European Commission. The Manhood Peninsula Partnership provides a forum for local residents and organisations as well as national organisations, for strategic planning as integrated coastal zone management. The major infrastructure development so far has been the Medmerry coastal realignment completed in 2013 that protects 300 hectares of important and biodiverse habitats. It involved building sea defences inland and allowing around 180 ha of new seawater marshland to form as a sustainable defence for local buildings.

She is a council member of the Society for the History of Alchemy and Chemistry.

== Publications ==
She is the author of a book and several scientific publications including:

- Carolyn Cobbold (2020) A Rainbow Palate: How Chemical Dyes Changed the West's Relationship with Food, University of Chicago Press, pp 288, ISBN 9780226727059
- Carolyn Cobbold (2019) Adulation or Adulteration? Representing Chemical Dyes in the Victorian Media Ambix '66 23-50
- Carolyn Cobbold (2018) The rise of alternative bread leavening technologies in the nineteenth century Annals of Science 75 21–39

== Awards ==
- In 2016 Cobbold was elected a Fellow of the Royal Society of Arts for her work on climate-change mitigation and community engagement.
- In November 2020 she was included in the BBC Radio 4 Woman's Hour Power list 2020.
