= West Itchenor =

Village and parish in West Sussex, England

Coordinates: 50.80536°N 0.86676°W

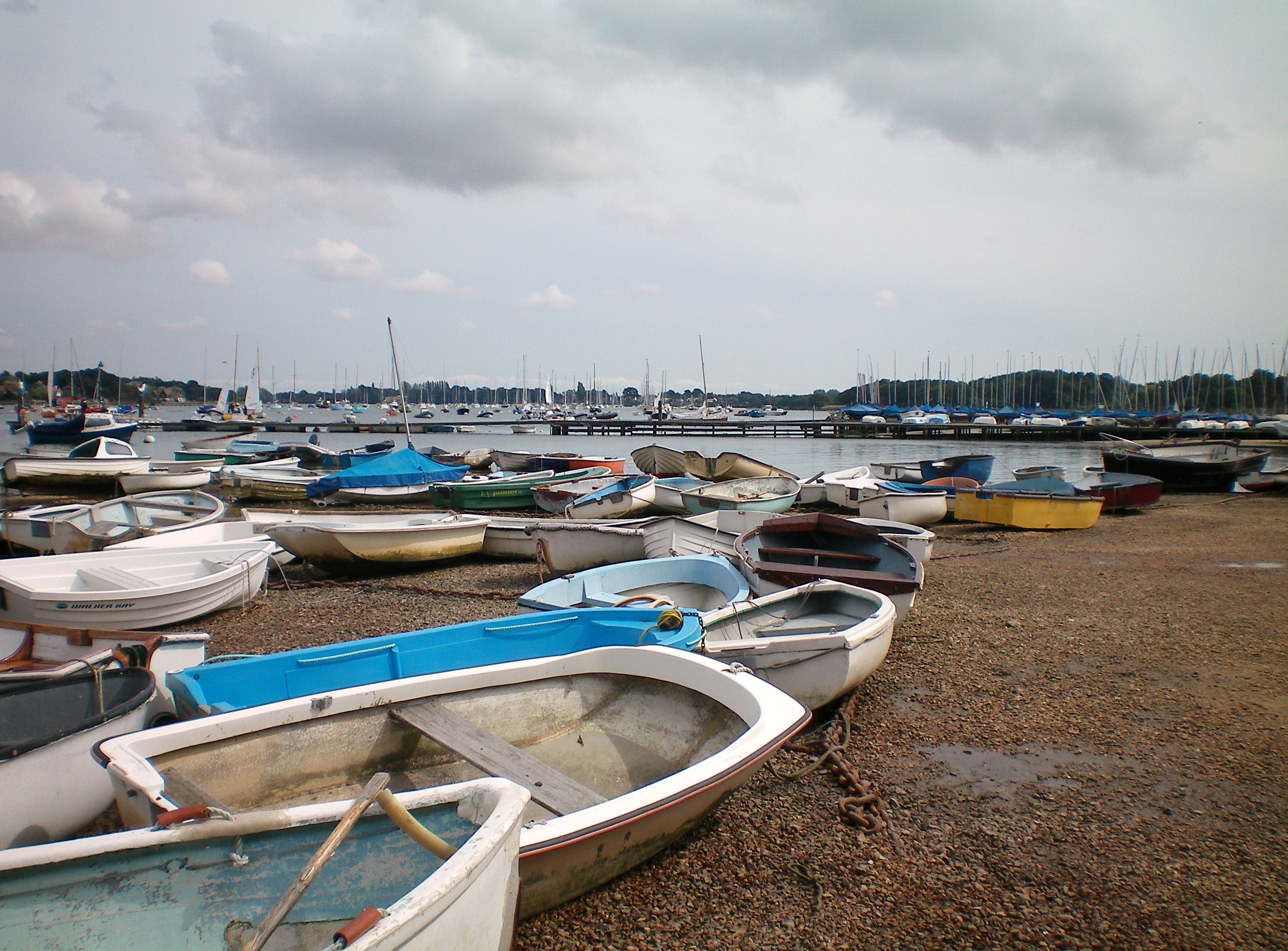
- The foreshore leading to the sailing club

- Location within West Sussex
- Area: 4.13 km^{2} (1.59 sq mi)
- Population: 289 (2011 Census)
  - Density: 109/km^{2} (280/sq mi)
- OS grid reference: SU799012
  - London: 58 miles (93 km) N
- Civil parish: West Itchenor
- District: Chichester
- Shire county: West Sussex
- Region: South East
- Country: England
- Sovereign state: United Kingdom
- Post town: CHICHESTER
- Postcode district: PO20
- Dialling code: 01243
- Police: Sussex
- Fire: West Sussex
- Ambulance: South East Coast
- UK Parliament: Chichester

West Itchenor is a village and civil parish, on the Manhood Peninsula, in the Chichester District of West Sussex, England. It lies north of the B2179 Chichester to West Wittering road 4.5 miles (7.3 km) southwest of Chichester. The village lies on the shores of Chichester Harbour.

Since the desertion of East Itchenor in the 15th century, the village has been simply referred to as Itchenor.

== History ==
A settlement is thought to have been established during the Roman conquest of Britain in AD 43, however the area was one of the first to be resettled by the South Saxons when they colonialised the south coast. West Itchenor takes its name from the chieftain Icca, who laid claim to its shoreline, and was originally known as Iccanore ('Icca's shore'). The Domesday Book of 1086 names the village as Icenore, with six households, and notes that the land was held by Warin, a vassal of "Earl Roger" who invaded England with William the Conqueror. In 1187 it was called Ichenore, and by 1243 Westichenor. The manor later became a parcel of the Earl of Arundel.

In 1175 the Lord of the Manor Hugh Esturmy built a chapel in West Itchenor, adjacent to the River Haven; prior to the construction of a sea wall and sluice in 1931, a spring tide would cause the river to rise and surround the building. Between 1180 and 1197 the chapel became a parish church dedicated to St Nicholas, the patron saint of seafarers.

The population of West Itchenor diminished during the Black Death which swept England from 1348, yet the village survived. East Itchenor was part of the contiguous parish of Birdham but was never more than a mansion with around 100 acres of farmland although it did have its own chapel. The latter's subsequent decline in the following century culminated in its unification with Birdham in 1440.

Towards the end of the 19th century, West Itchenor became a popular destination for Londoners who could afford a second home in the countryside and the cost of travelling there. These people, known locally as 'DFLs' (Down from London), have caused the rapid growth of the village since that time. However, despite the increased number of households, the number of full-time and economically active residents has fallen, as house prices have increased with the demand for second homes. This in turn caused the closure of the general store and post office in 1974 and of the local village school. The Itchenor Society estimated in 2012 that over 40% of all households were second homes.

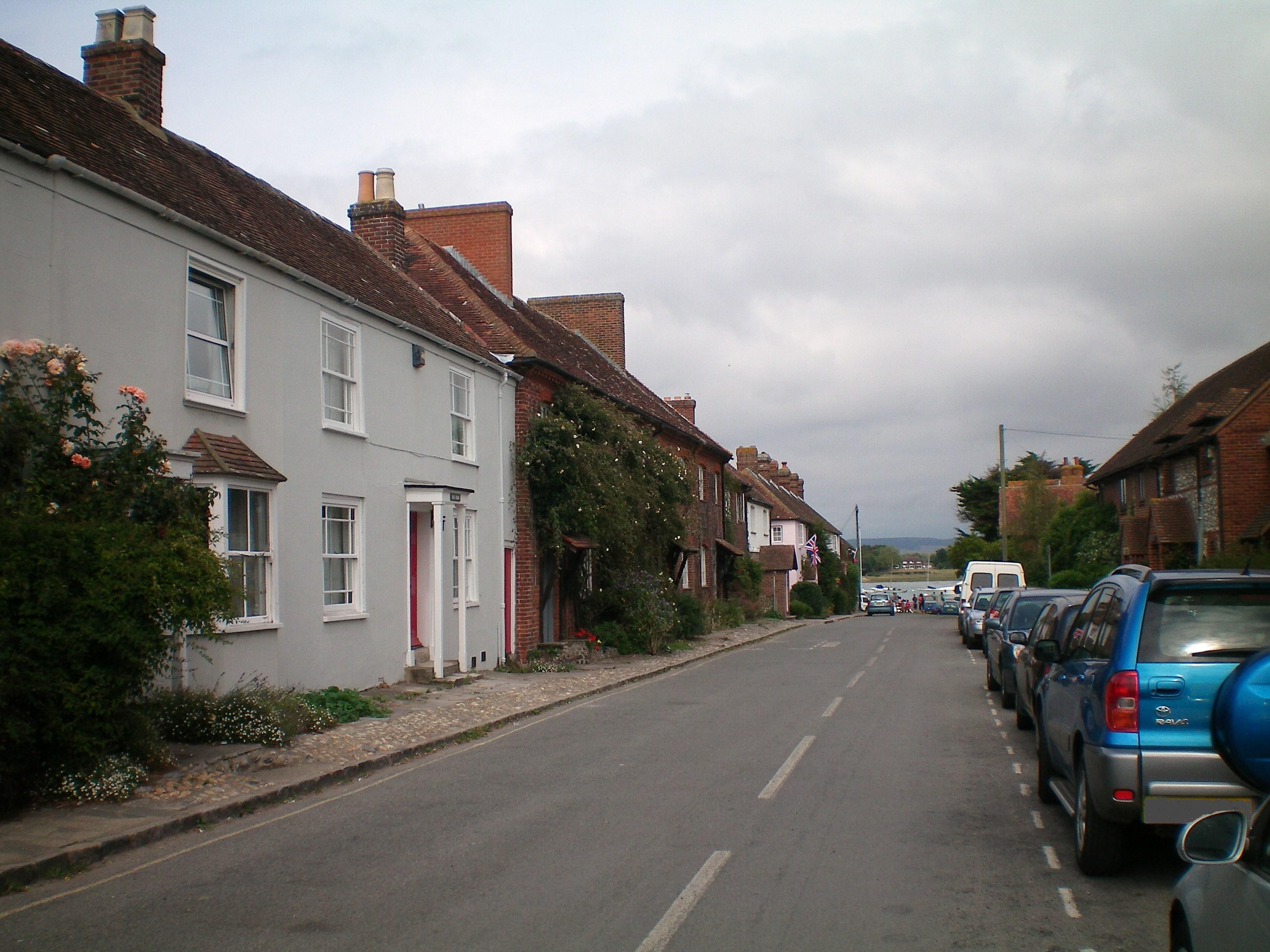
View of The Street, leading to the harbour

During the Second World War, Itchenor Shipyard served as a base for the Admiralty's manufacturing of Fairmile B motor launches and Itchenor Sailing Club was requisitioned by the British Army, which mounted an anti-aircraft gun at the club to attack approaching Luftwaffe planes. This wartime activity made West Itchenor a restricted area and required residents to produce identification papers as they entered the village.

== Area and demographics ==
The parish covers an area of 413 hectares (1020 acres). According to the Office for National Statistics, based on the 2011 Census estimates, 289 people lived in 140 households, of whom 122 were economically active. 99.7% of residents were White and 76.5% identified as Christian.

== Economy ==
Since the 1700s shipbuilding has provided the main source of employment in the village – West Itchenor was the site of a prominent shipyard during the Napoleonic Wars in which a number of warships were launched, such as HMS Pelorus in 1808 and HMS Curacao in 1809. In 1800 the Transit, a 101 ft long, four-masted barquentine weighing 200 tons, was built at the yard and is said to have been revolutionary in the design of its hull and rig. During the 19th century construction began to decline, as the development of railways provided a more accessible mode of transport. Shipbuilding in West Itchenor made a modern revival with the opening of Haines Boatyard in 1912. In 1936 a new yard, called the 'Itchenor Shipyard' was built on the site that had seen production during the 18th and 19th centuries.

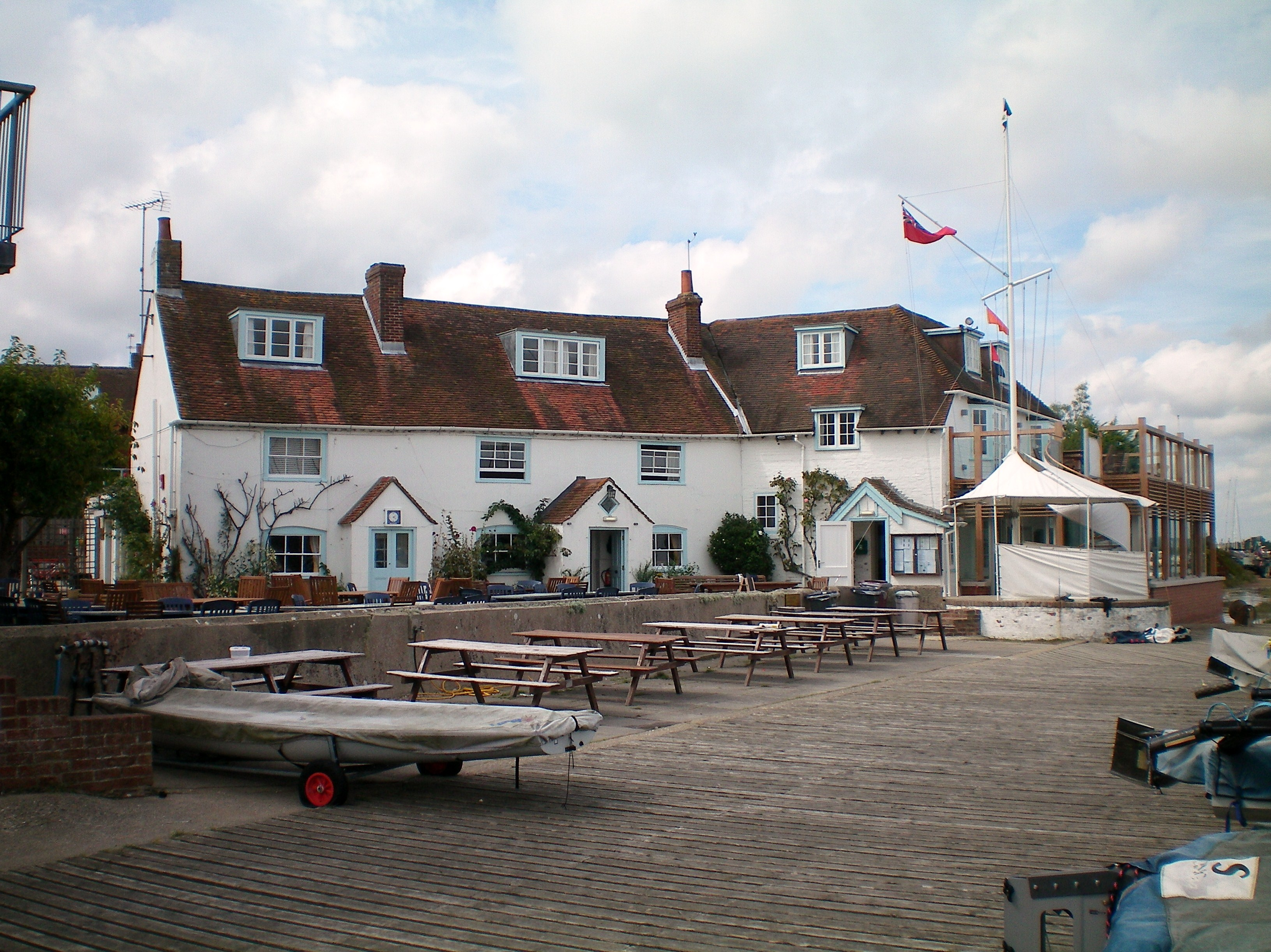
Itchenor Sailing Club

Northshore Yachts Ltd now occupies the site of the Itchenor Shipyard and has overseen the complete manufacturing of Fisher and Southerly yachts, since the mid-1970s. In April 2013 it was reported that Northshore was experiencing financial difficulties and that the future of the boatbuilding company and its estimated 160 employees is in doubt.

There is a pub in the centre of the village, and Travis Perkins and a holiday caravan park on the south eastern boundary.

== Politics ==
West Itchenor was an ancient parish of the county of Sussex. Until 1894 it formed part of Manhood Hundred, an ancient division of Chichester Rape. From 1894 to 1933 it was part of Westhampnett Rural District. From 1933 to 1974 it was part of Chichester Rural District, and since 1974 it has been a part of Chichester District.

West Itchenor Parish Council sits seven elected members, with elections taking place every four years. In representing the people of the parish, the councillors meet monthly to discuss matters including planning, community engagement and finance. West Itchenor falls under The Witterings electoral division which returns one member to sit on West Sussex County Council. The village also falls under The Witterings ward which returns three members to sit on Chichester District Council. It is a part of the Chichester constituency, which had been a safe Conservative seat for a century until it was won by Jess Brown-Fuller of the Liberal Democrats in 2024.

== Landmarks ==
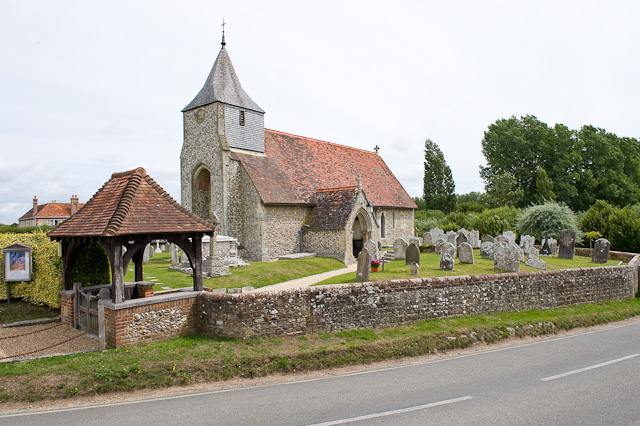
St Nicholas' Church, West Itchenor

- The Church of St. Nicholas is a part of the Prebendary of Wightring. It was founded around 1175 by Hugh Esturmy. In 1935 its parish joined with the Parish of Birdham to make the Parish of Birdham with Itchenor. In 1986 the Parish of Birdham with Itchenor united with the Parish of West Wittering to make the Benefice of West Wittering and Birdham with Itchenor.
- Itchenor Sailing Club has been the site of social activity within the village since its founding in 1927. Since then it has hosted national and local sailing competitions, including annual events such as Schools Week and Junior Fortnight. The sailing club is recognised as a Royal Yachting Association Volvo Champion Club and has produced a number of successful olympic sailors.
- Chichester Harbour, an Area of Outstanding Natural Beauty and Site of Special Scientific Interest, is located partly within the parish. This is a wetland of international importance, a Special Protection Area for wild birds and a Special Area of Conservation. The harbour is of particular importance for wintering wildfowl and waders of which five species reach numbers which are internationally important.

== Notable residents ==
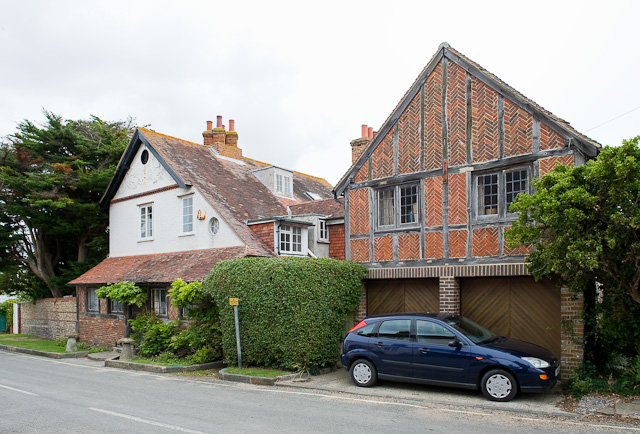
Old Haven, former residence of Charles Dixon

Artists and writers

- Nicola Green (born 1972), portrait artist
- Jonathan Church (born 1967), stage director
- Susannah Harker (born 1965), actress
- Pete Postlethwaite (1946–2011), actor
- Polly Adams (born 1939), actress
- David Cobb (1921–2014), maritime artist
- Evelyn Laye (1900–1996), actress
- William Tracy Wallace (1880–1947), artist and publisher
- Charles Dixon (1872–1934), maritime artist
- Joseph Harker (1855–1927), scene painter and theatrical designer

Business

- Peter Shand Kydd (1925–2006), businessman and former stepfather of Diana, Princess of Wales
- Lord Benson (1909–1995), accountant and advisor to the Bank of England

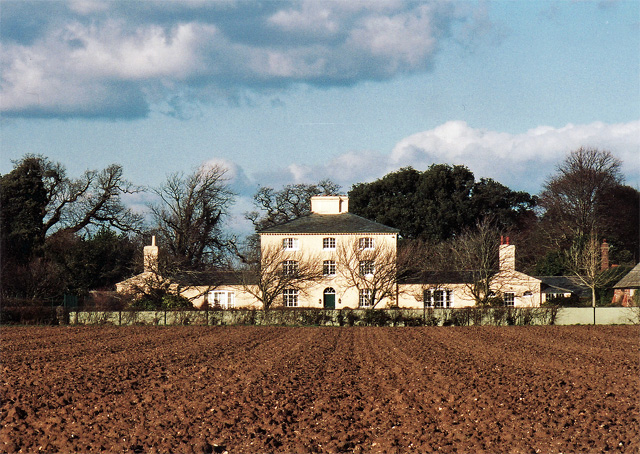
Itchenor Park House, country retreat of the 3rd and 5th Dukes of Richmond

Politicians

- Charles Gordon-Lennox, 5th Duke of Richmond (1791–1860), Postmaster General (Grey)
- Charles Lennox, 3rd Duke of Richmond (1735–1806), Secretary of State for the Southern Department (Rockingham I)

Sportspeople

- Stewart Morris (1909–1991), sailor and Olympic gold medallist (Swallow, 1948)
- Wyatt Gibbs (1830–1891), cricketer

== Gallery ==
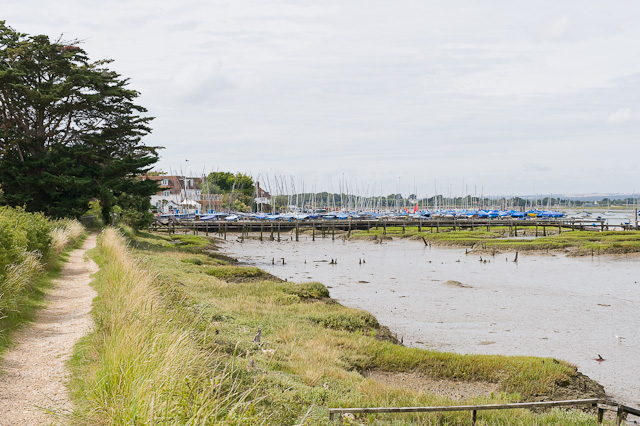
Footpath adjacent to Itchenor Reach in Chichester Harbour

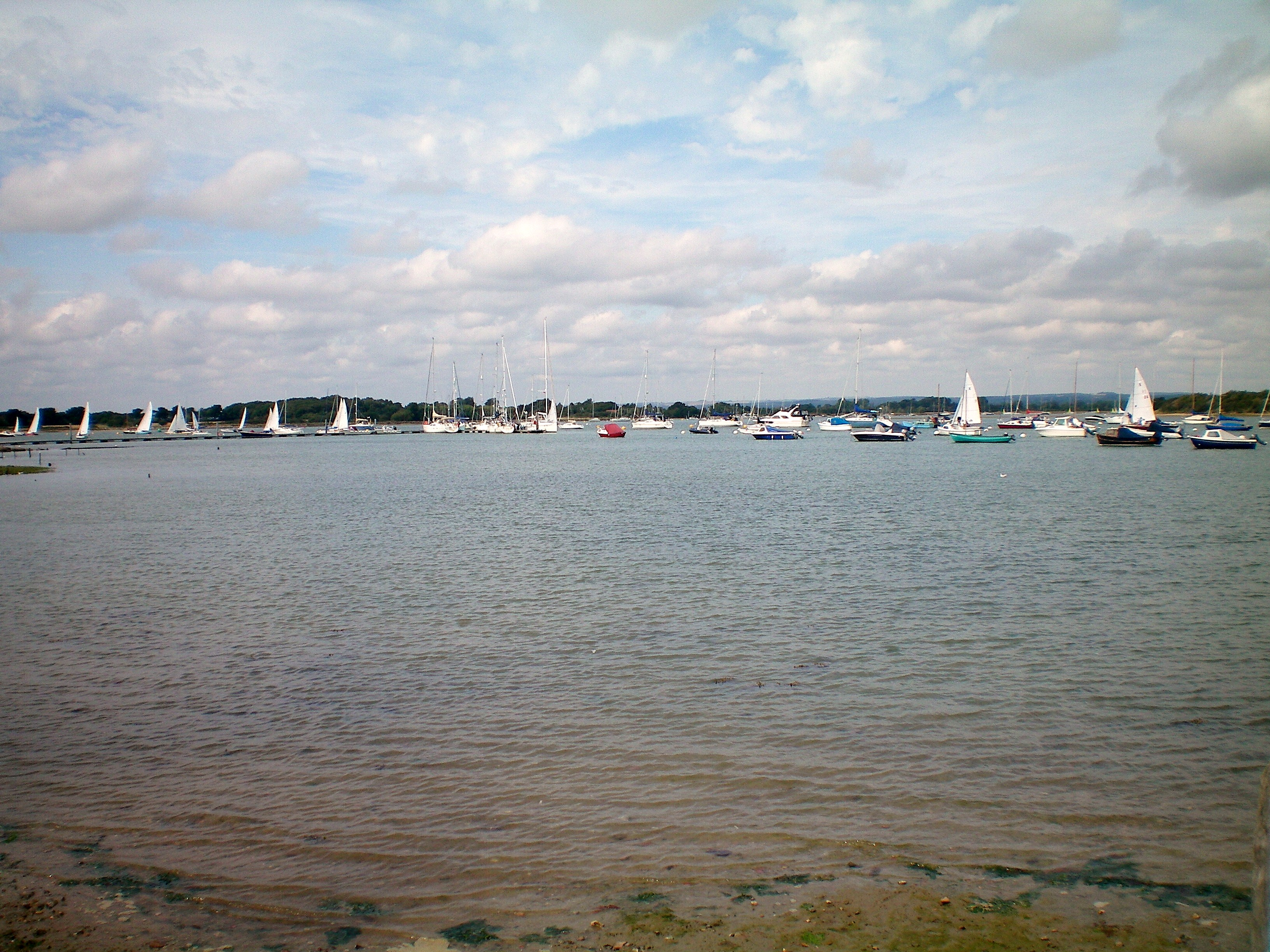
View of the harbour from the foreshore

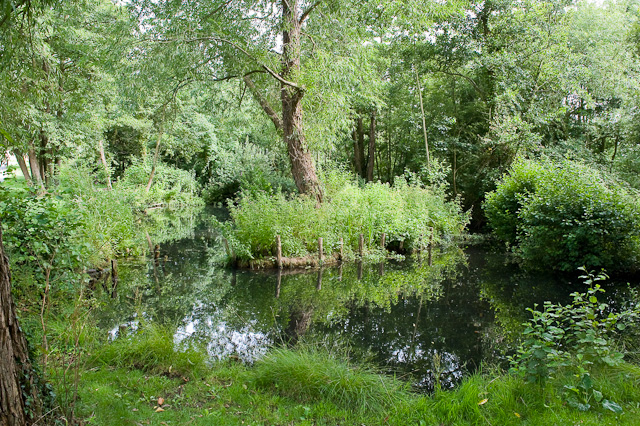
River Haven, contained in the village pond

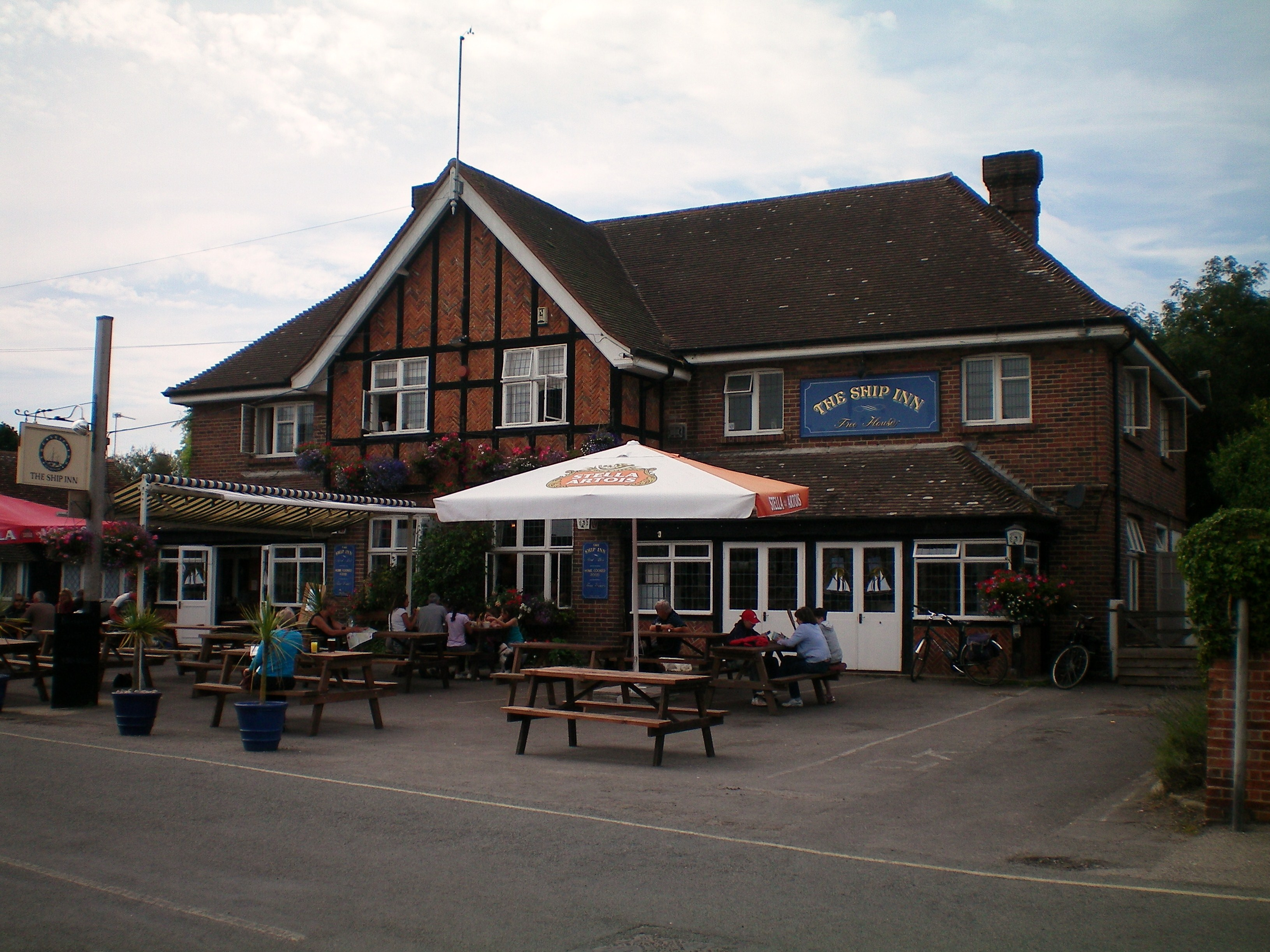
The Ship Inn
