= Melanella sowerbyi =

Scientific classification
- Kingdom: Animalia
- Phylum: Mollusca
- Class: Gastropoda
- Subclass: Caenogastropoda
- Order: Littorinimorpha
- Family: Eulimidae
- Genus: Melanella
- Species: †M. sowerbyi

Binomial name
- †Melanella sowerbyi (R. B. Newton, 1891)

Synonyms
- † Polygyreulima sowerbyi R. B. Newton, 1891 superseded combination (also misspelled generic name)

Species of gastropod

Melanella sowerbyi is an extinct species of sea snail, a marine gastropod mollusk in the family Eulimidae. The species is one of a number within the genus Melanella.

== Distribution ==
Fossils of this species were found in Middle Eocene strata at Bracklesham Bay, Great Britain.
