= East Itchenor =

Settlement in West Sussex, England

- Abandoned farm
- Location within West Sussex
- Coordinates: 50.797636°N 0.84269483°W
- Country: England
- County: Sussex
- Hundred: Manhood

East Itchenor is the site of a demolished 'manor' house, on the Manhood Peninsula, in West Sussex, England. There was never an actual manor (in the legal sense) nor is it an abandoned village. This is an area of dispersed settlements rather than nucleated ones.

== History ==
East Itchenor derives its name from the Anglo-Saxon chieftain Icca, who laid claim to the shores of East and West Itchenor, as both settlements were originally known as Iccannore ('Icca's shore'). Although the Domesday Book of 1086 names the village as Icenore, by 1268 it was recorded as Estychenore and its eponymous sister village as Westichenor. The Domesday Book also makes mention of two manors in Icenore, necessitating the distinction between 'East' and 'West': the manor covering East Itchenor was owned by the Bishop of Exeter Osbern FitzOsbern and was an endowment of the College of Bosham. East Itchenor was then held by Roger de Montgomery who attached it to his manor of Birdham. There was never a separate manor of East Itchenor with demesne holdings or manor courts.

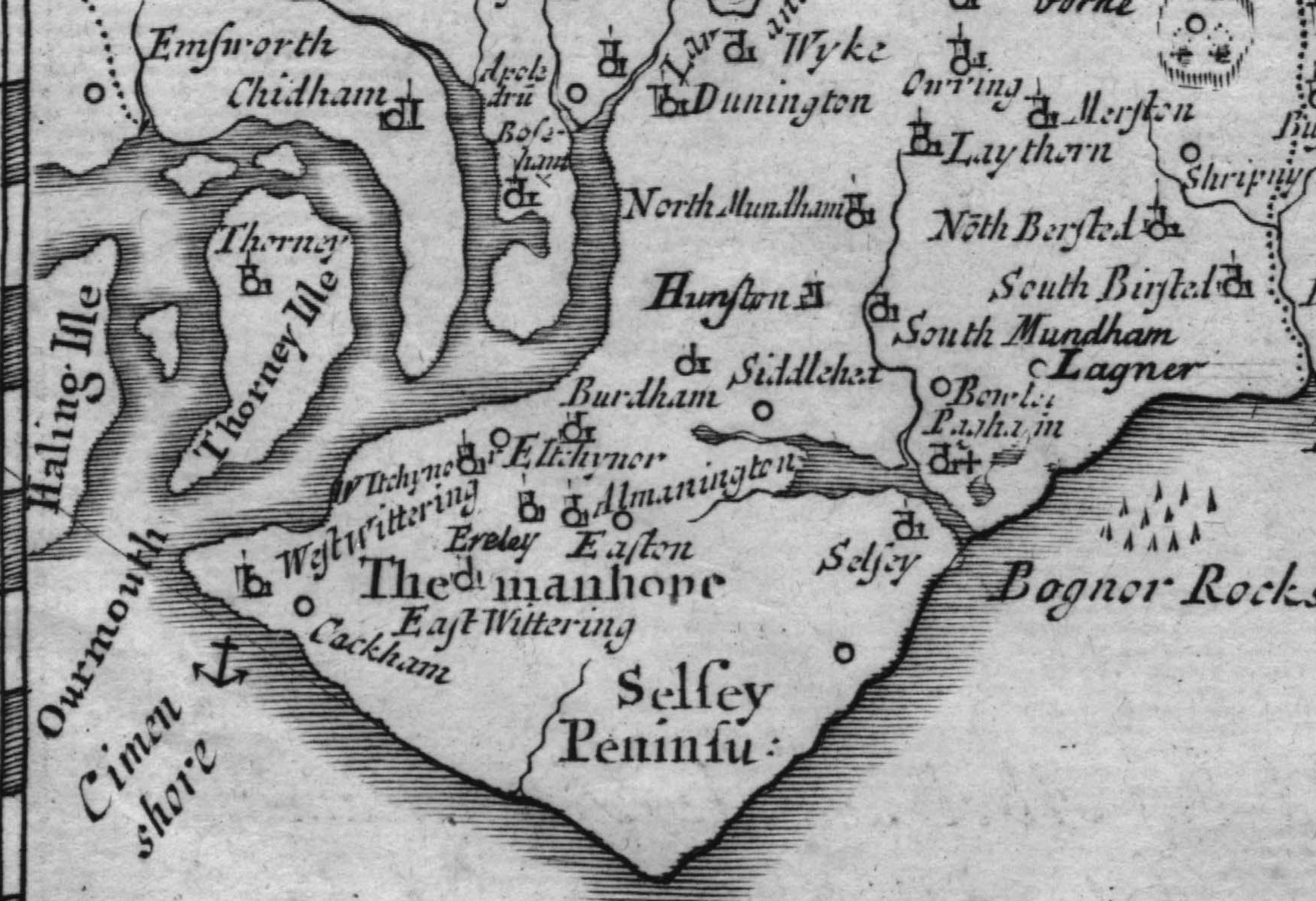
Section of Robert Morden's map of Sussex from 1695, showing the location of "E Itchynor"

By the 13th century East Itchenor had a chapel in its own right, better endowed than that of Birdham parish church: in a 1291 survey the rectory was valued at £8.00 a year, as opposed to Birdham's £5.6s.8d. Never consisting of more than a few families employed in farming on the estate its population fell so that in 1440 the Bishop of Chichester Richard Praty united its parish with Birdham.

A map of 1828 shows a significant mansion there but this had been demolished some twenty years later.
