= East Wittering and Bracklesham =

Civil parish in West Sussex, England

Coordinates: 50.7703°N 0.8737°W

East Wittering
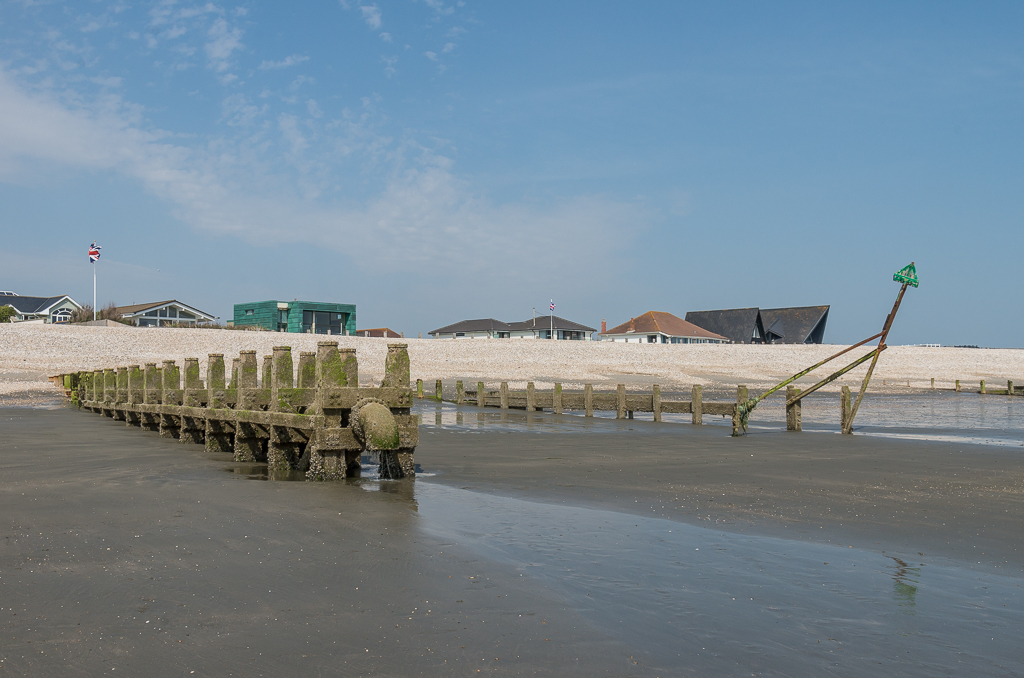
- Bracklesham Bay

- Location within West Sussex
- Area: 3.85 km^{2} (1.49 sq mi)
- Population: 4,117 2001 Census
  - Density: 1,070/km^{2} (2,800/sq mi)
- OS grid reference: SZ795973
  - London: 60 miles (97 km) NNE
- Civil parish: East Wittering
- District: Chichester
- Shire county: West Sussex
- Region: South East
- Country: England
- Sovereign state: United Kingdom
- Post town: CHICHESTER
- Postcode district: PO20
- Dialling code: 01243
- Police: Sussex
- Fire: West Sussex
- Ambulance: South East Coast
- UK Parliament: Chichester
- Website: http://www.ewbpc.org.uk/

East Wittering, or East Wittering and Bracklesham, is a civil parish in the Chichester district of West Sussex, England. The parish lies on the coast of the Manhood Peninsula, approximately six miles (9.6 km) southwest of Chichester. It comprises the built-up areas of Bracklesham and the eastern half of East Wittering, the western half of which lies within the boundary of West Wittering civil parish. To the east of Bracklesham used to be East Thorney, a detached portion of East Wittering separated from the body of the parish by the very narrow strip of Earnley. East Thorney is now under the sea off Bracklesham.

== Landmarks ==
The Site of Special Scientific Interest Bracklesham Bay is within the parish. It is an area of biological and geological interest.
