= David Cobb (artist) =

British artist (1921–2014)

David Cobb (15 March 1921 – 18 June 2014) was a British marine artist and served as president of the Royal Society of Marine Artists.

In the early 1940s, Cobb served as 1st Lieutenant in the Atlantic convoys. Between 1943 and 1945, he commanded MTBs, working in the North Sea.

Cobb began his painting career at Newlyn and then worked in the Sussex village of Itchenor (where he lived for some years) until he moved to live near Brockenhurst in the New Forest in the 1950s. He lived with his wife, Jean, until she died in 2008.

He died on 18 June 2014.
