= Wyatt Gibbs =

English cricketer

Personal information
- Full name: Wyatt Gibbs
- Born: 5 May 1830; West Itchenor, Sussex, England
- Died: 25 May 1891 (aged 61); Bagshot, Surrey, England
- Batting: Left-handed
- Bowling: Right-arm roundarm fast

Domestic team information
- Years: Team
- 1864–1865: Sussex

Career statistics
Competition	First-class
Matches	5
Runs scored	42
Batting average	10.50
100s/50s	–/–
Top score	18
Balls bowled	448
Wickets	7
Bowling average	25.71
5 wickets in innings	–
10 wickets in match	–
Best bowling	3/49
Catches/stumpings	2/–
- Source: Cricinfo, 27 December 2011

Wyatt Gibbs (5 May 1830 – 25 May 1891) was an English cricketer. Gibbs was a left-handed batsman who bowled right-arm roundarm fast. He was born at West Itchenor, Sussex.

Gibbs made his first-class debut for Sussex against Hampshire at Day's Antelope Ground, Southampton in 1864. He made four further first-class appearances for Sussex, the last of which came against Kent in 1865. In his five first-class matches, he scored 42 runs at an average of 10.50, with a high score of 18. With the ball, he took 7 wickets at a bowling average of 25.71, with best figures of 3/49.

He died at Bagshot, Surrey on 25 May 1891.
