= Manhood Peninsula =

Coastal location in West Sussex

Coordinates: 50.7°N 0.8°W

Hundred of Manhood
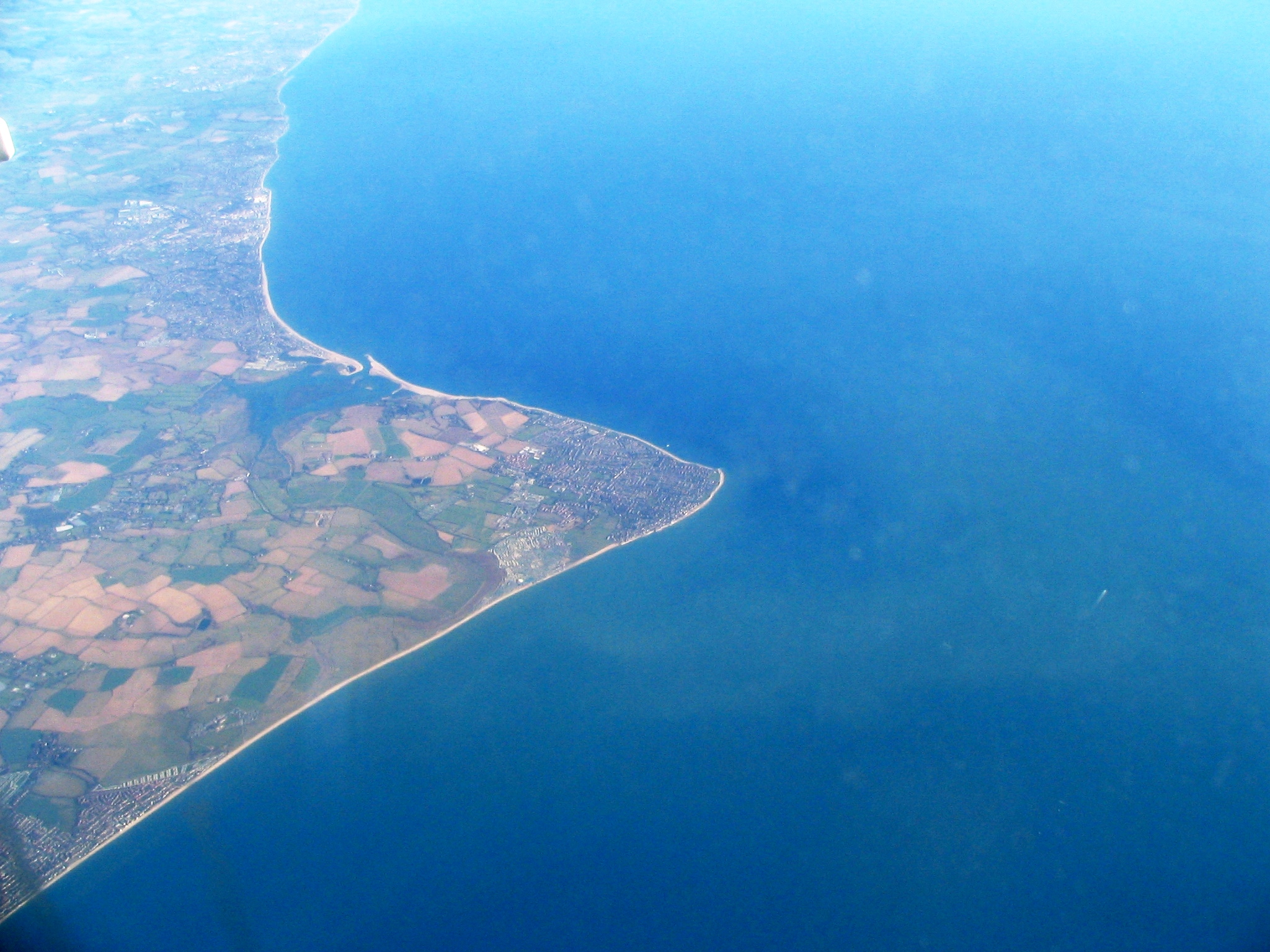

- History
  - Created: 7th century
  - Abolished: 19th century
  - Succeeded by: Chichester District Council
- Status: Abolished
- Subdivisions
  - Type: Seven parishes
  - Units: Birdham; Earnley; East Wittering; Selsey; Sidlesham; West Itchenor; West Wittering

The Manhood Peninsula is in the southwest of West Sussex in England. It has the English Channel to its south and Chichester to the north. It is bordered to its west by Chichester Harbour and to its east by Pagham Harbour, its southern headland being Selsey Bill.

It was, including some hinterland, known as the Hundred of Manwood and the name is a corruption of the latter word. Set up in Anglo-Saxon-dominant England, it had its own courts and local government, eroded by the charitable and civic functions of the vestry and waxing and waning of the manorial system; the system of hundreds was abolished by Parliament in the 19th century.

== Name ==
The name has changed in its third consonant spoken, and its spellings over the years. Manwed is on the Armada map of 1587, Manhode on a map of 1663 and Manhope on Morden's map of 1695. The name is probably derived from the Old English gemǣnewudu meaning "woodland held in common". This woodland remained in common until 1793 when 693 acres (2.80 km^{2}) were enclosed by Acts of Parliament.

== History ==
The peninsula formed the main part of the Hundred of Manwood, in the Rape of Chichester. The Rape was a county sub-division peculiar to Sussex.

In AD681 St Wilfrid arrived in the land of the South Saxons and spent five years there evangelising them. Æthelwealh, king of the South Saxons, granted land on the Manhood to Wilfrid. However shortly after the South Saxons were conquered by the Kingdom of Wessex and it was their king, Cædwalla who confirmed the land grant of 87 hides that enabled Wilfrid to found the local monastery. The foundation charter AD 673 (? for 683) is actually spurious and probably fabricated in the tenth century at the time of Brihthelm (Bishop of Selsey). It is thought that the motive for the production of a fabricated charter, was to enable Brihthelm to support his claim for the restoration of land, on the Manhood, that had been seized by a third party.

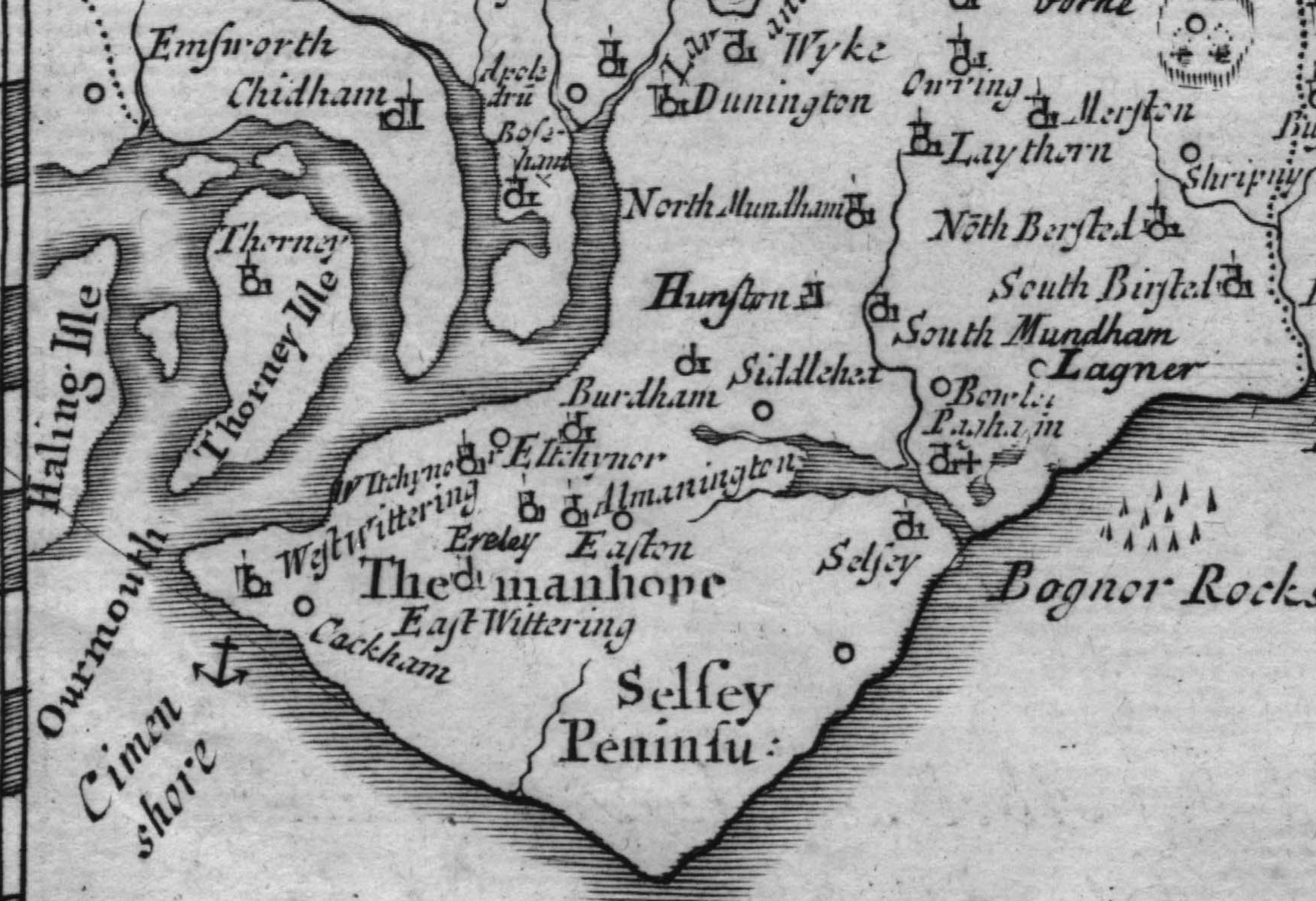
Section of Robert Morden's map of Sussex from 1695, with the peninsula shown as The manhope.

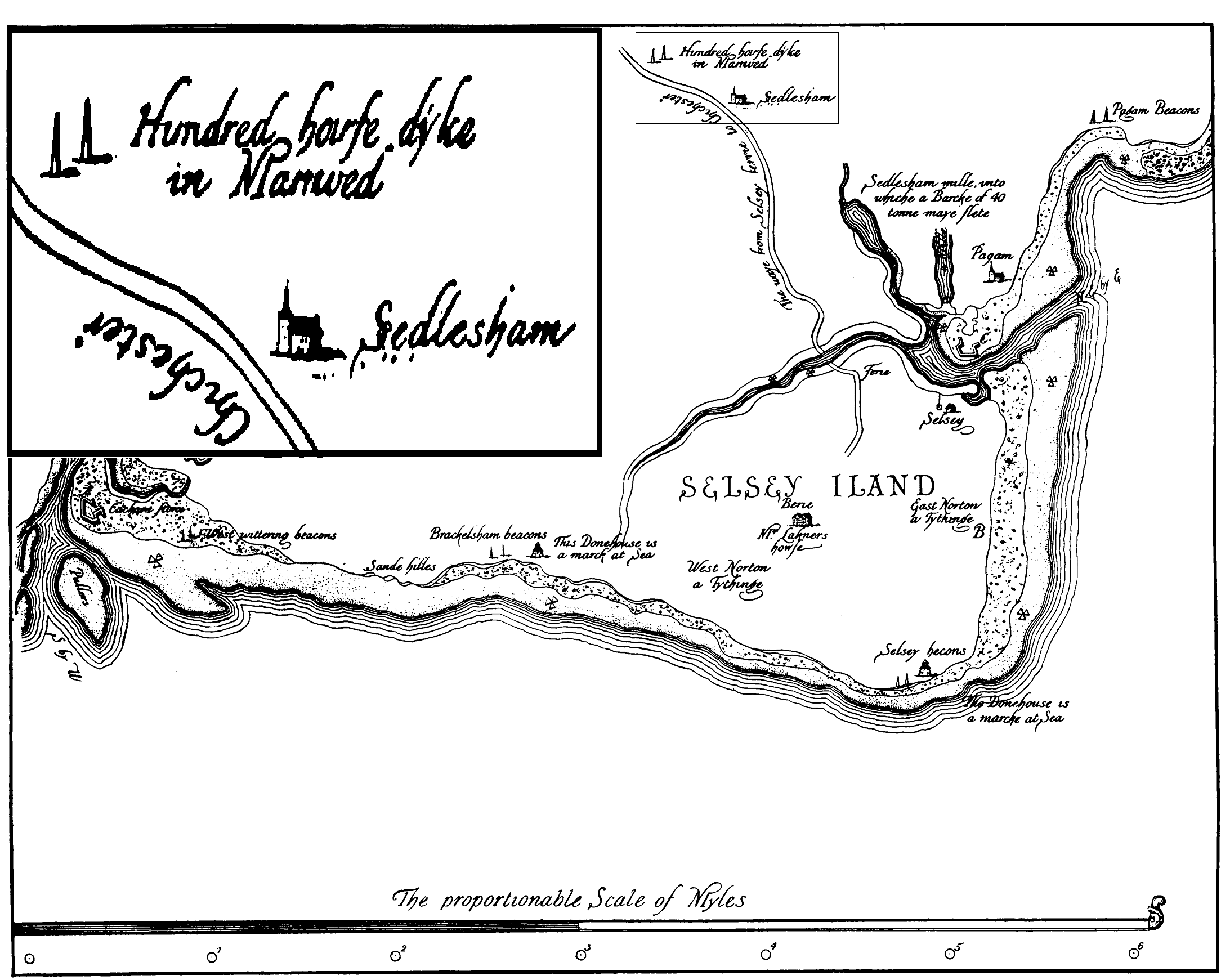
Armada Map of the Selsey peninsula from a survey made in 1587. Note the "Hundred House in Manwed (Manhood)" at the top of map, with detail inset.

After the Norman conquest the area became a barony, by which tenure the Bishop of Chichester sat as a peer in parliament.

The Hundred was an ancient unit of local administration. At the time of the Domesday Survey, Sussex contained 59 hundreds. The area of each hundred in Sussex would have been approximately 25 square miles (65 km^{2}), quite small in comparison to other counties where the hundred could be as much as 200 square miles (520 km^{2}) in area. During Norman times the hundred would pay geld (a form of land tax) based on the number of hides. To assess how much everyone had to pay, a clerk and a knight were sent by the king to each county, they sat with the sheriff of the county and a select group of local knights. There would be two knights from each hundred. After it was determined what geld had to be paid, then the knights of the hundred and the bailiff of the hundred were responsible for getting the money to the sheriff, and the sheriff to the Exchequer.

Possibly from the 10th century onwards, Manwood had its own hundred court and it also dealt with matters that a local authority of today would deal with, such as dispute resolution and highways. At the time of the Domesday Survey the Hundred was known as the Hundred of Westeringes and Somerley with an Earl Roger of Montgomery holding the Hundred of 'Westeringes' (Wittering), containing Birdham (3 1/2 hides), Itchenor (1 hide), Somerley in East Wittering (1 hide) and West Wittering (1 hide). Roger Montgomery was one of the kingdoms most powerful lords, at the time, with extensive landholdings around the country including nearly all of what is now West Sussex. The Bishop of Chichester (formerly of Selsey) held the Hundred of Somerley with 10 hides in Selsey, 12 in Sidlesham, and 14 in West Wittering.

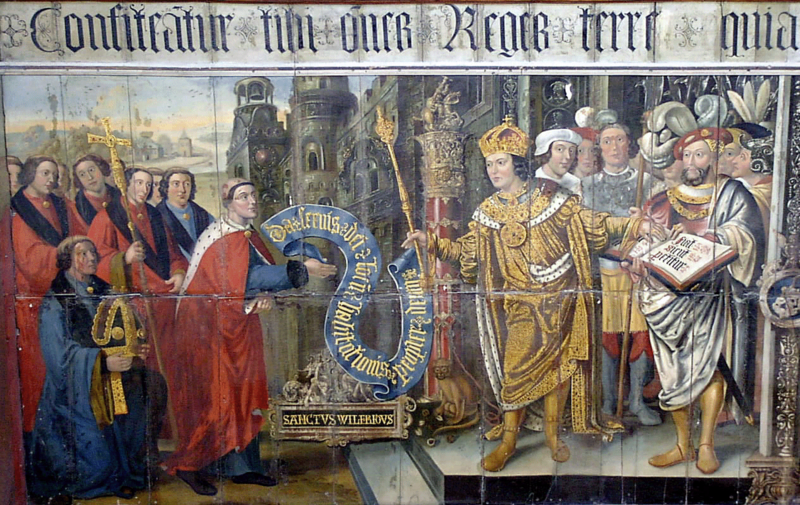
Picture of Cædwalla granting lands (including the Manhood) to Wilfrid. (Note: S.232: "Cædwalla, king [of the West Saxons], grants fifty-five hides in and around Selsey and thirty-two hides elsewhere in West Sussex to Bishop Wilfrid.")

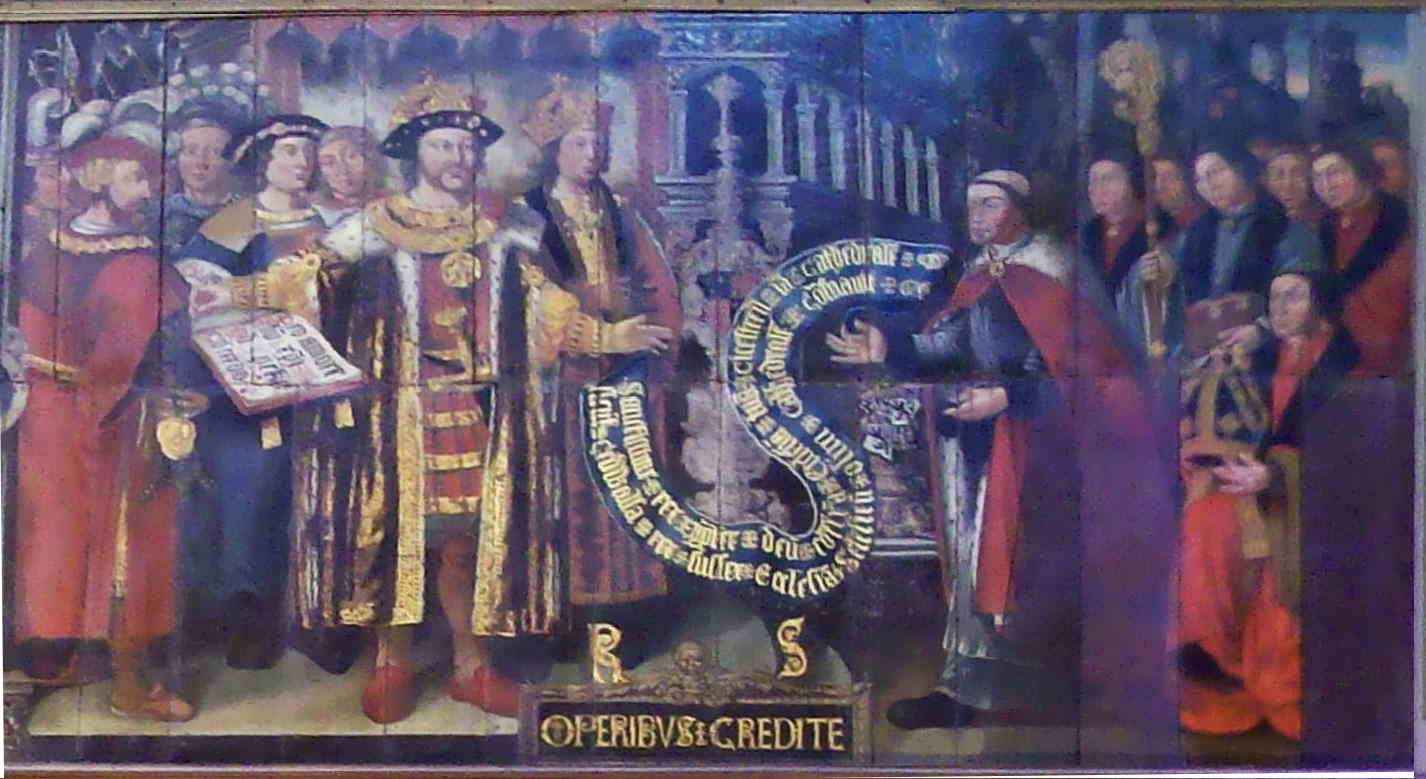
Henry VIII confirming the bishopric to Robert of Sherbourne consisting of the lands originally granted to Wilfrid..

Tudor paintings in Chichester Cathedral by Lambert Barnard

By the 12th century the two Hundreds became united in the one Hundred of Manwood and was a liberty of the Bishop of Chichester, consisting of the land originally given to St Wilfrid by Cædwalla. (Note: In the English law, by liberty is meant a privilege held by grant or prescription, by which some men enjoy greater benefits than ordinary subjects. A liberty is also a territory, with some extraordinary privilege.)

In 1524 the Earl of Arundel was informed by some of his servants that he could claim the right of distraining cattle found in a certain part of Manwood Hundred. A claim was made by the Earl of Arundel, based on his ownership of the manor of Almodington. To settle the dispute a meeting was held at the Hundred court-house between Robert Sherborne, Bishop of Chichester and John Stilman, the Earl's counsel. The bishop produced the charter of Cædwalla, (Note: Charter S.232 – The (boundary) ran from the entrance of Selsey Harbour (now called Pagham Harbour), round the coast to "Hormouth" at the entrance to Chichester Harbour" (now West Wittering); "then up the estuary to 'Brimesdik' (683) or 'Bremerdytch' (1525)" (the stream dividing Birdham from Appledram); "then eastwards to Wayflete, and from thens in circuit into Made-up-lane (now Jury Lane) and so eastward to Dammer-gate; and so along the dytch unto the said Unredisdytch" (now Bremere Rife, which runs south into Selsey Harbour).) which "expressly stated the circuit of the liberties of the Manwooda". When the earl died the bishop continued the case with the earl's son. In 1525 there was a meeting held in an empty barn, in the presence of 300 men including residents of Donnington. After the earl's counsel had compared the bishop's holding with the provisions of the founding charter, under the seal of Cædwalla, it was agreed by the earl's counsel, that the earl had no rights in the matter, and warned the inhabitants of Donnington not to pursue it further. The Henry VIII charter confirmed the boundary of the land, (Note: "the lybertyes of the Manwode belonging to the Byshop of Chichester, beginneth at Uredisdytch and extendeth southward, to the havyn of Wyddering, now called Selsey Haven, extending westward as the course of the sea, to Hormouth Haven, now called West Widdering; and from thence northward it extendeth along to Viales-flete, now called Bosham-dytch; and so from thens upwarde the havyn, to Brunesdyke, now called Bremers-dytch; and from thens extendinge eastwarde to Wayflete, and thens in circuit into Made-up-lane, and so eastwarde to Dammer-gate; and so along the ditch unto the said Unredisdytch.") which coincided with the original charter from Cædwalla in favour of St. Wilfrid.

The hundred court of the Bishop of Chichester was held a court-leet on several occasions each year and also administered Manwood Coon and the foreshore rights which were also the possessions of the Bishop. Representatives of the tithings of West Wittering, Thurlwood, Birdham, East Wittering, Almodington, Bracklesham, Sidlesham, Somerley and Selsey.This continued till about 1835 and would have been held at the hundred-moot at Hundredsteddle Farm, Somerley near Birdham. According to The Placenames of Sussex, Somerley is the Old English for a "clearing used in summer" and an earlier version of steddle was probably staddle, the name Hundredsteddle would be a reference to the floor on which the Hundred court would have sat. (Note: The word steddle was quite common in Sussex various examples being: Bedsteddle – Bedstead;Jointsteddle – a stool framed by joinery work; Oxsteddle – Stabling or stalls for oxen; Steddle – a small side table or a temporary arrangement of boards and trestles.)

In 1561 Elizabeth I passed an act that removed some of the rectories (major church-land interests) from the See of Chichester. They were, as widely done, sold to lay proprietors such as Sir William Morley who bought that of Selsey for £4,100 in 1635.

== List of parishes in the Hundred of Manwood, latterly Manhood ==
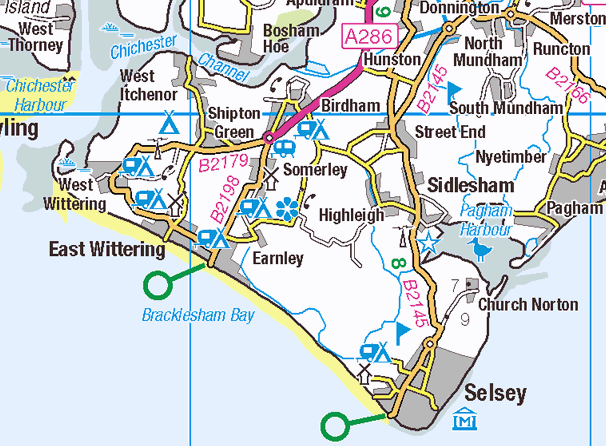
Map of the Manhood Peninsula

- Birdham
- Earnley
- East Wittering
- Selsey
- Sidlesham
- West Itchenor
- West Wittering

East Itchenor, annexed to Birdham in 1441; and Almodington, annexed to Earnley in 1526 were never parishes but chapelries. Bracklesham, largely washed away by the sea was finally united to East Wittering in 1518. For purposes of taxation the hundred was divided into four vill—Sidlesham, Selsey, Wittering and Birdham.

== The Manhood today ==
The Hundred, (Note: A district of country originally comprehending one hundred families.) as a judicial and administrative unit, was diminished by various acts of parliament in the 19th century. The peninsula is administered by Chichester District Council with the villages and town on the peninsula also having their own local councils.

Many organisations, both commercial and non-commercial, that are based on the Manhood Peninsula have the name Manhood in their title. Some organisations exist to deal with common issues and problems encountered by all on the Manhood, such as the Manhood Peninsula Partnership, a "resident-inspired partnership of local communities, local and national government agencies, and other bodies involved in the Manhood". This was formed in 2001 with Carolyn Cobbold as one of the co-founders.

The 300 hectares (740 acres) Medmerry managed realignment scheme for coastal defence from flooding was completed in 2013. It allows a region near the sea to be flooded to protect the town of Selsey and other buildings further inland. The new wetland has provided new space for tourists as well as a wildlife habitat.

A study by Princeton University and McGill University concluded that the Manhood Peninsula is at particularly high risk of flooding as its topography is less than 5 metres (16 ft) above the current mean sea level. It is projected that, without improvements to the sea defence infrastructure, by 2050, the district will fall below mean sea level. By 2100, broader areas including the Witterings, Bracklesham, Selsey, Birdham, Almodington (Note: Almodington is part of Earnley.) and Sidlesham will be subject to permanent inundation. Chichester District Council commissioned a flood risk assessment from consultants JBA. (Note: A firm of specialist consultants, who manage weather and environmental risks and opportunities for their clients.) Based on this the council has updated its strategic flood risk assessment. It was considered necessary to revise the housing and employment land availability assessment as a result.

== In Literature ==
Under the name of Seals' Island, Manhood Peninsula is the setting for a large part of the novel Dawn Wind by Rosemary Sutcliff.

== See also ==
- Hundred of Manhood and Selsey Tramway
- List of hundreds of England and Wales
- List of peninsulas
