= Bracklesham Bay =

Bay in West Sussex, United Kingdom

Coordinates: 50.753°N 0.847°W

- Site of Special Scientific Interest
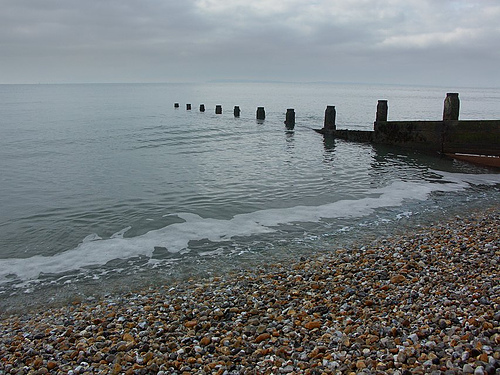
- Location of Bracklesham Bay.
- Area of search: West Sussex
- Grid reference: SZ 814 954
- Interest: Biological; Geological
- Area: 200.6 hectares (496 acres)
- Notification date: 1986
- Location map: Magic Map

Bracklesham Bay is a 200.6-hectare (496-acre) biological and geological Site of Special Scientific Interest in West Sussex. It is a Geological Conservation Review site.

Bracklesham is a coastal bay on the west side of the Manhood Peninsula in West Sussex, England. The bay looks out onto the English Channel and the Isle of Wight is visible from the beach, as is the Nab Tower lighthouse and the Spinnaker Tower in Portsmouth. The villages of Bracklesham and East Wittering are situated in the centre of the bay and it is bordered by the town of Selsey on the southeastern tip, and the village of West Wittering on the west side.

== Biology and geology ==
This stretch of foreshore has unimproved grazing pastures, shingle, salt marsh, reed beds and ditches. The pasture is subject to seasonal flooding and it is important for its breeding and overwintering birds. The site has highly fossiliferous Eocene (56 to 34 million years ago) beds with over 160 fish species. There are also much more recent Middle Pleistocene marine deposits dating to around 500,000 years ago which provide a record of changes in sea levels.

== Medmerry managed realignment scheme ==
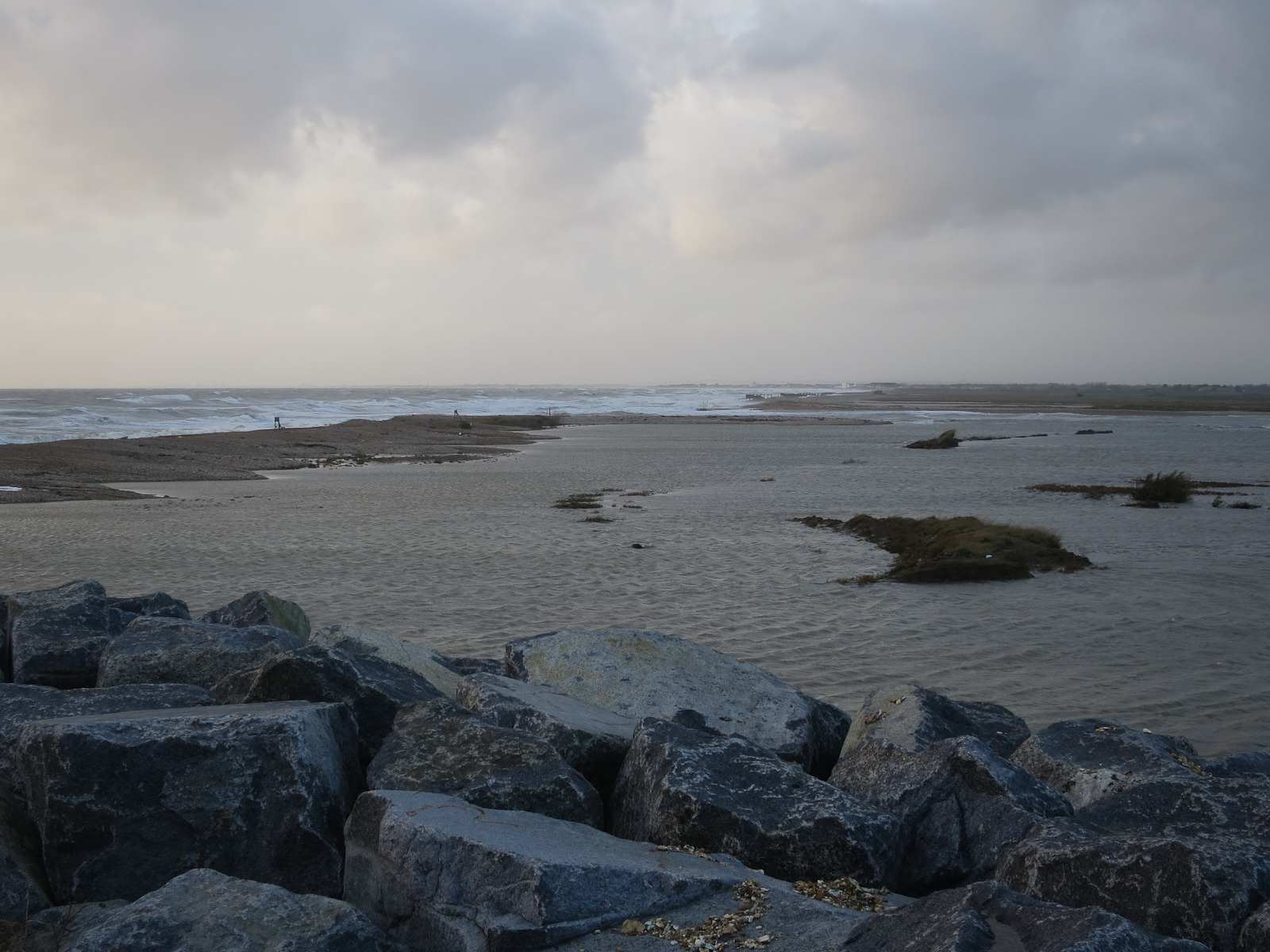
Medmerry realignment scheme (geograph 4791022)

The earth embankment at Medmerry holding back the sea was originally built in the 1960s; however the coastline in the area was subject to frequent flooding events which were becoming unsustainable. The scheme arose out of consultations from the 2008 Pagham to East Head Coastal Defence Strategy with the managed realignment scheme being adopted. In 2013 the Environment Agency completed the new 7 km inland floodbank and breach in the shingle wall to providing flood relief and this enabled creation of the form the Medmerry RSPB nature reserve. The scheme cost £28 million and was the largest open-coast scheme in Europe and understood to be one of the most sustainable projects the Environment Agency has completed.

A willow and wire woven periwinkle art installation was created by environmental artists Mark Antony Haden Ford and Rebecca Ford. It has been mistaken by some visitors as depicting the poop emoji.
