= West Wittering =

Village and parish in West Sussex, England

Coordinates: 50.78064°N 0.89564°W

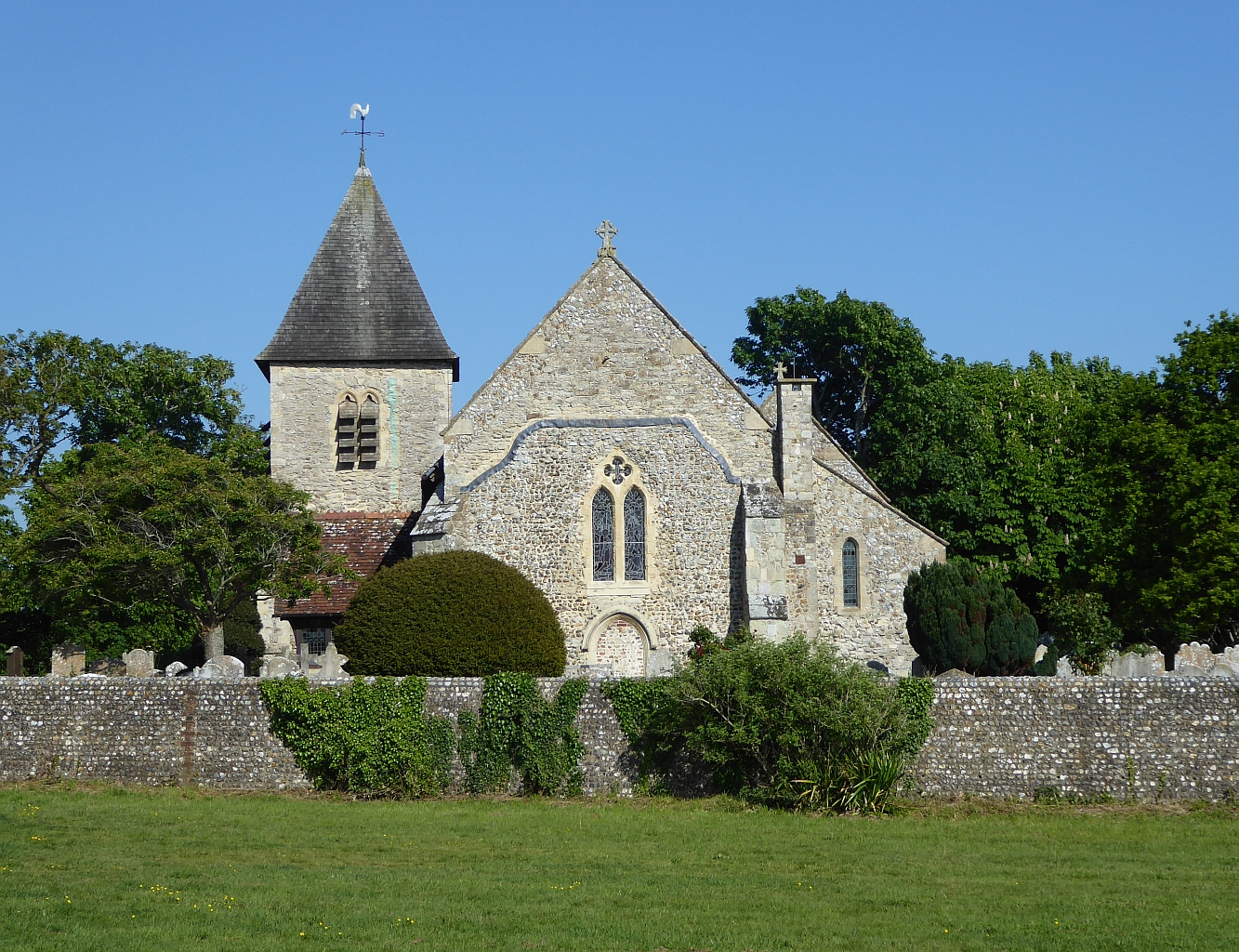
- St Peter and St Paul’s Church, West Wittering

- Location within West Sussex
- Area: 13.63 km^{2} (5.26 sq mi)
- Population: 2,700. 2011 Census
  - Density: 197/km^{2} (510/sq mi)
- OS grid reference: SZ779984
  - London: 60 miles (97 km) NE
- Civil parish: West Wittering
- District: Chichester
- Shire county: West Sussex
- Region: South East
- Country: England
- Sovereign state: United Kingdom
- Post town: CHICHESTER
- Postcode district: PO20
- Dialling code: 01243
- Police: Sussex
- Fire: West Sussex
- Ambulance: South East Coast
- UK Parliament: Chichester
- Website: Parish Council

West Wittering is a village and civil parish situated on the Manhood Peninsula in the Chichester district of West Sussex, England. It lies near the mouth of Chichester Harbour on the B2179 road 6.5 miles (10.5 km) southwest of Chichester close to the border with Hampshire. The sandy beach was described as having excellent water quality in 2017.

The population in 1872 was 616. The 2001 census records a population of 2,684. There is a primary school.

== Governance ==
Wittering was recorded in the Domesday Book of 1086 as comprising four households and a value of one pound. It was principally ploughing land, ploughed by two teams. The tenant-in-chief was Earl Roger of Shrewsbury under the lordship of Ralph of Bignor, whereas prior to the Norman Conquest it was privately owned.

In modern times, an electoral ward in the same name exists. This ward includes some of Birdham and at the 2011 Census had a total population of 4,472.

== Natural history ==
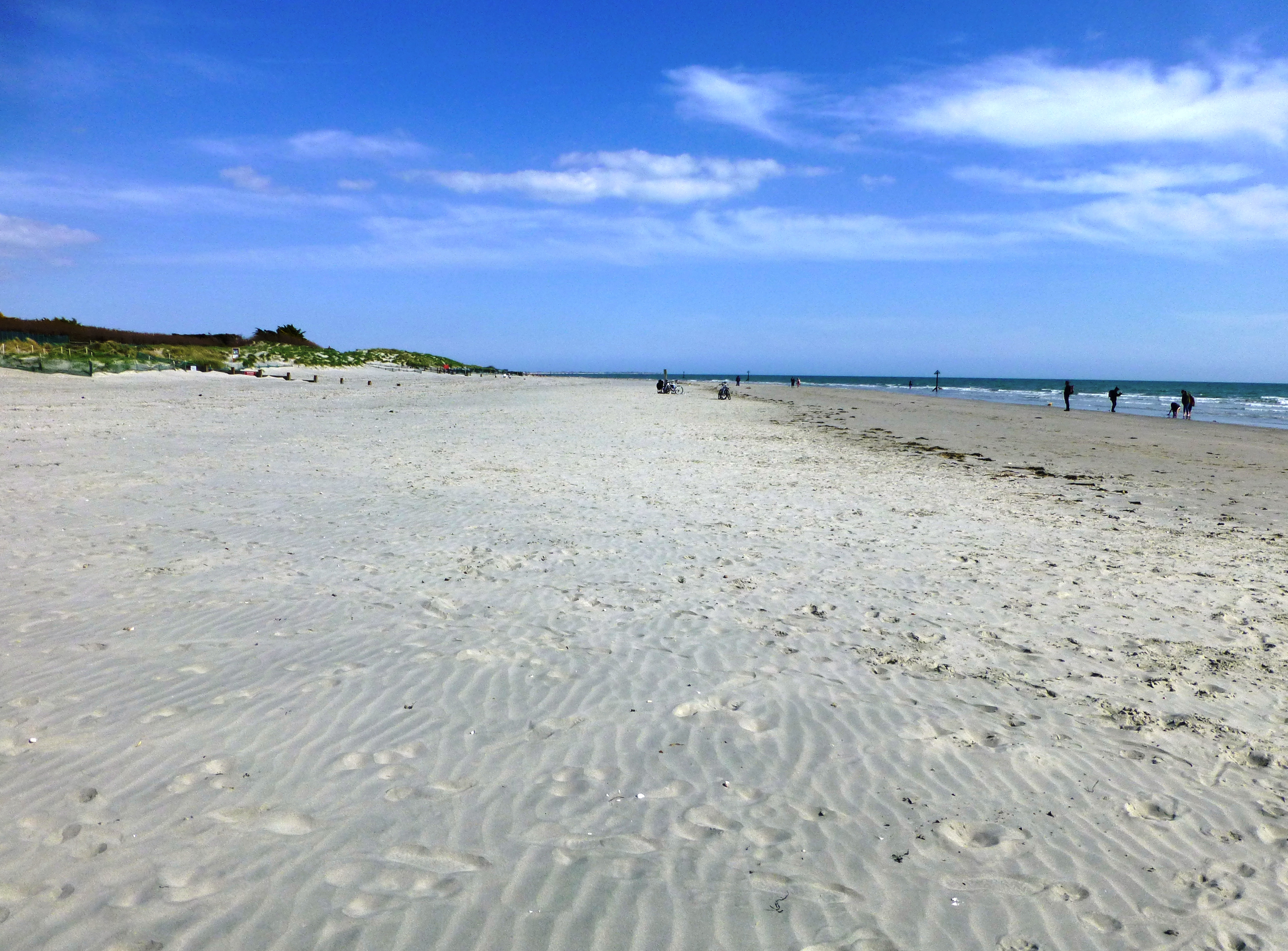
West Wittering beach

Part of the Site of Special Scientific Interest Bracklesham Bay runs in between the coastline in the parish.

Chichester Harbour, a Site of Special Scientific Interest is partly within the parish. This is a wetland of international importance, a Special Protection Area for wild birds and a Special Area of Conservation. The harbour is of particular importance for wintering wildfowl and waders of which five species reach numbers which are internationally important. The beach is situated on the Chichester Harbour, which is a protected Area of Outstanding Natural Beauty. The beach is well-known for its windsurfing and kitesurfing conditions. The beach is managed by the National Trust, and has been designated as a Site of Special Scientific Interest due to its rare habitats and wildlife. It is considered to be one of the best beaches in the UK for swimming due to its clean water and gently sloping shoreline.

== Transport ==
Buses are run by Stagecoach South. Services run to Chichester.

The nearest train station is Chichester.

== Notable residents ==
- Michael Ball, actor and singer.
- Nicholas Lyndhurst, actor.
- Bevil Mabey (1916–2010), businessman and inventor.
- Keith Richards of the Rolling Stones.
- Lord Nicholas Gordon Lennox, diplomat and son of the Duke of Richmond.
- Sir Henry Royce, engineer, designer of Rolls-Royce cars and aero-engines. From 1917 until his death in 1933.
- Kate Winslet, actress, lives in West Wittering.

== Bibliography ==
The locality is referred to in Giles Cooper's radio play Unman, Wittering and Zigo.

At the mouth of Chichester Harbour lies the little settlement of West Wittering, beautiful and glittering when the sea flows round it at high tide, forlorn and untidy when it is out.

— Clare Jerrold

- J.M. Wilson Imperial Gazetteer of England and Wales 1872
- Clare Jerrold Picturesque Sussex, Hove, Combridge 1932
