= Birdham =

Village and parish in West Sussex, England

Coordinates: 50.79683°N 0.83204°W

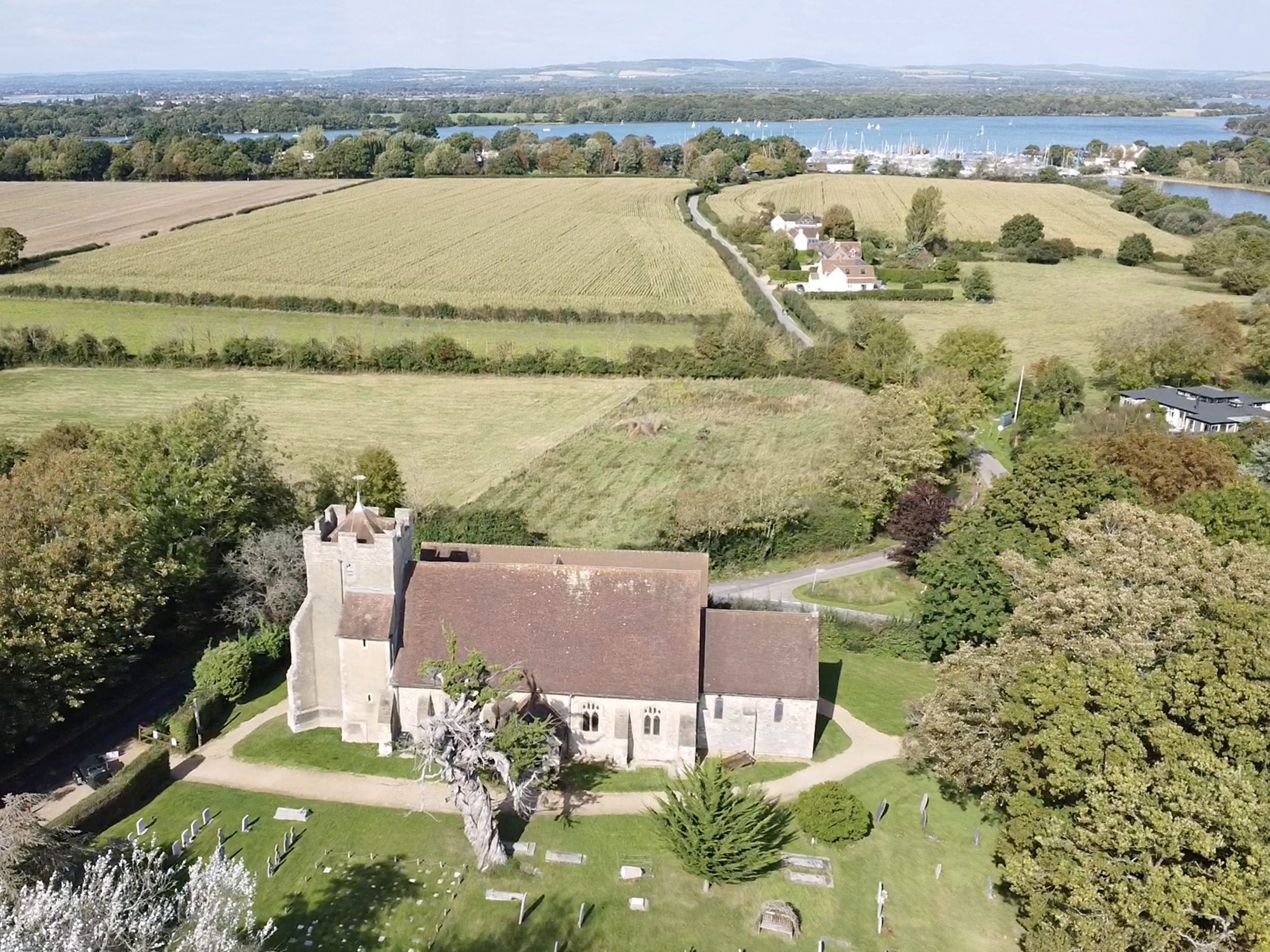
- Birdham church with Birdham Pool behind

- Location within West Sussex
- Area: 6.96 km^{2} (2.69 sq mi)
- Population: 1,483. 2011 Census
  - Density: 202/km^{2} (520/sq mi)
- OS grid reference: SU824003
  - London: 58 miles (93 km) NNE
- Civil parish: Birdham
- District: Chichester
- Shire county: West Sussex
- Region: South East
- Country: England
- Sovereign state: United Kingdom
- Post town: CHICHESTER
- Postcode district: PO20
- Dialling code: 01243
- Police: Sussex
- Fire: West Sussex
- Ambulance: South East Coast
- UK Parliament: Chichester
- Website: http://www.birdham.org.uk/

Birdham is a village and civil parish in the Chichester District of West Sussex, England. It is located on the Manhood Peninsula, c. 5 miles (8.0 km) south-west of the city of Chichester. The parish church is dedicated to St Benjamin, although the dedication was to St. Ethan until c. 1900.

The village sits on the shores of Chichester Harbour and is home to a locked marina on the site of a former tide millpond. The tide mill building itself still exists. In between it and Chichester marina are the lock gates to the disused Chichester Canal opened in 1822. The local school is Birdham C of E Primary School. According to the 2011 census Birdham parish had a population of 1,483.

HMS Birdham, a minesweeper, launched on 19 September 1955, was named after the village.

== History ==
Birdham's name derives from the Old English bridd and hām, and means a settlement frequented by young birds.

The only evidence of prehistoric settlement is a Bronze Age settlement.

Birdham is first mentioned in a series of Anglo-Saxon charters relating to land grants to the See of Selsey. Unfortunately, most of these are forgeries, Birdham was located in the ancient hundred of Wittering in Sussex according to the Domesday Book of 1086. The settlement comprised 16 households valued at three pounds five shillings.

Birdham is an area of dispersed settlements with no defined centre with a single store and no pubs. The enclosure of Manhood Common led to the development of small farms but the rapid rise in population only began in the 1930s.

During World War III, the tide mill and associated boat yards became HMS Sea Serpent in 1942. The various holiday camps in the area were used as billets for troops training for amphibious landings, especially D Day.

In May 2019, a new community centre opened.

== Governance ==
Birdham is governed at the parish level by Birdham Parish Council.

Birdham is a part of the Chichester District, and as such is governed by Chichester District Council.

Birdham is governed at the county level by West Sussex County Council.

For representation in Parliament, Birdham is a part of the Chichester constituency. Since 8 June 2017, the Member of Parliament for the Chichester constituency is Gillian Keegan.

== Demography ==
Religions adhered to by Birdham parish residents
| Christian | 66.1% |
| No religion | 24.5% |
| Other | 0.9% |
| Religion not stated | 8.6% |
Figures from the 2011 census. Religions with less than 1% adherence grouped as Other.

The 2011 census recorded a population of 1,483 for the parish of Birdham, forming 645 households. Birdham is a majority Christian parish with 981 (66.1%) residents identifying as such. 1,463 residents (98.7%) listed their ethnic group as White. The median age of Birdham parish was 50.

== Landmarks ==
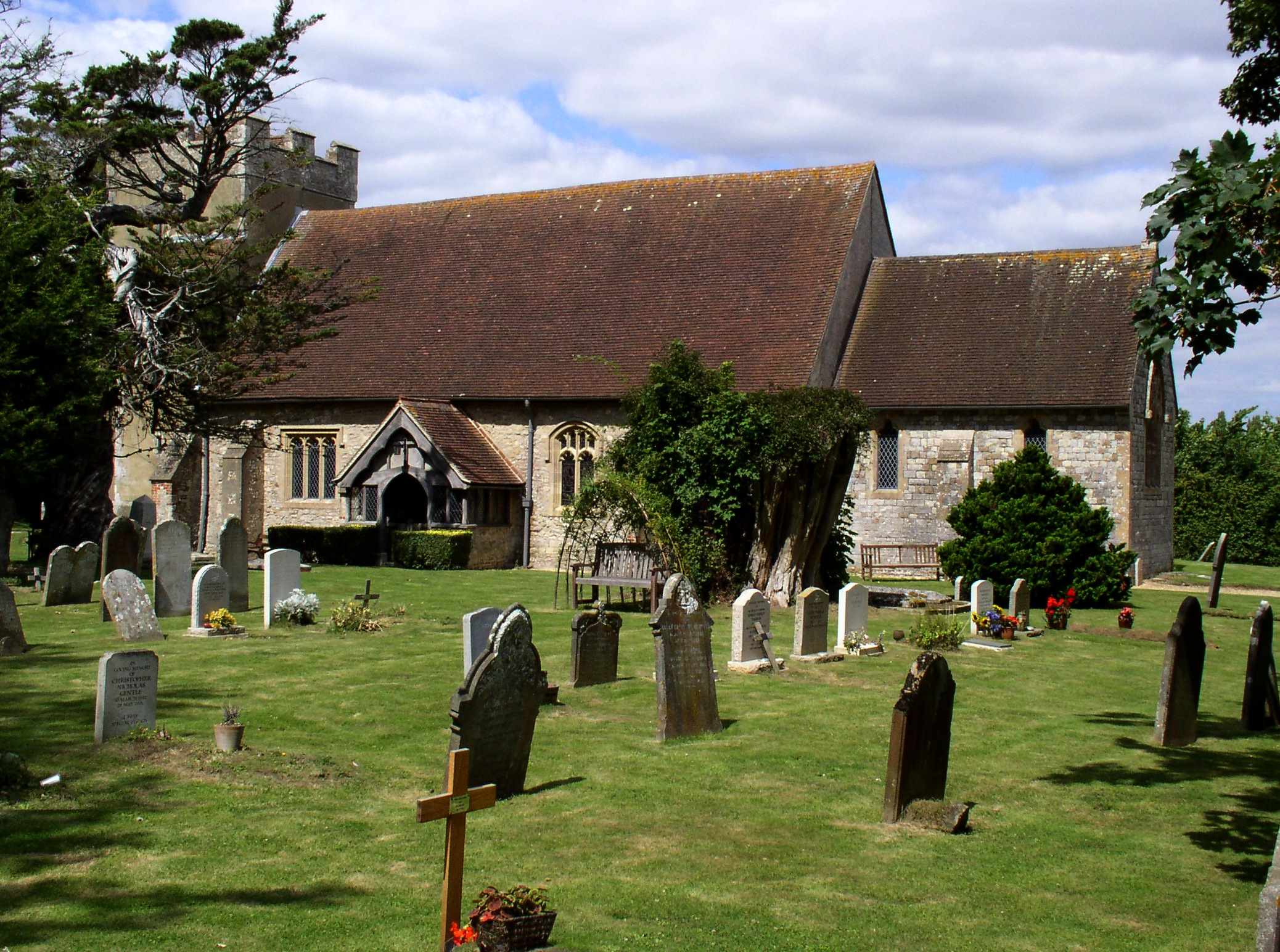
St James' Church viewed from the south in August 2011

The parish church, St James' Church, is a Grade I listed building.

== Transport ==
The nearest railway station is some 3 miles (4.8 km) northeast of the village, at Chichester or Fishbourne.
