= Lower Paleolithic =

Earliest subdivision of the Paleolithic

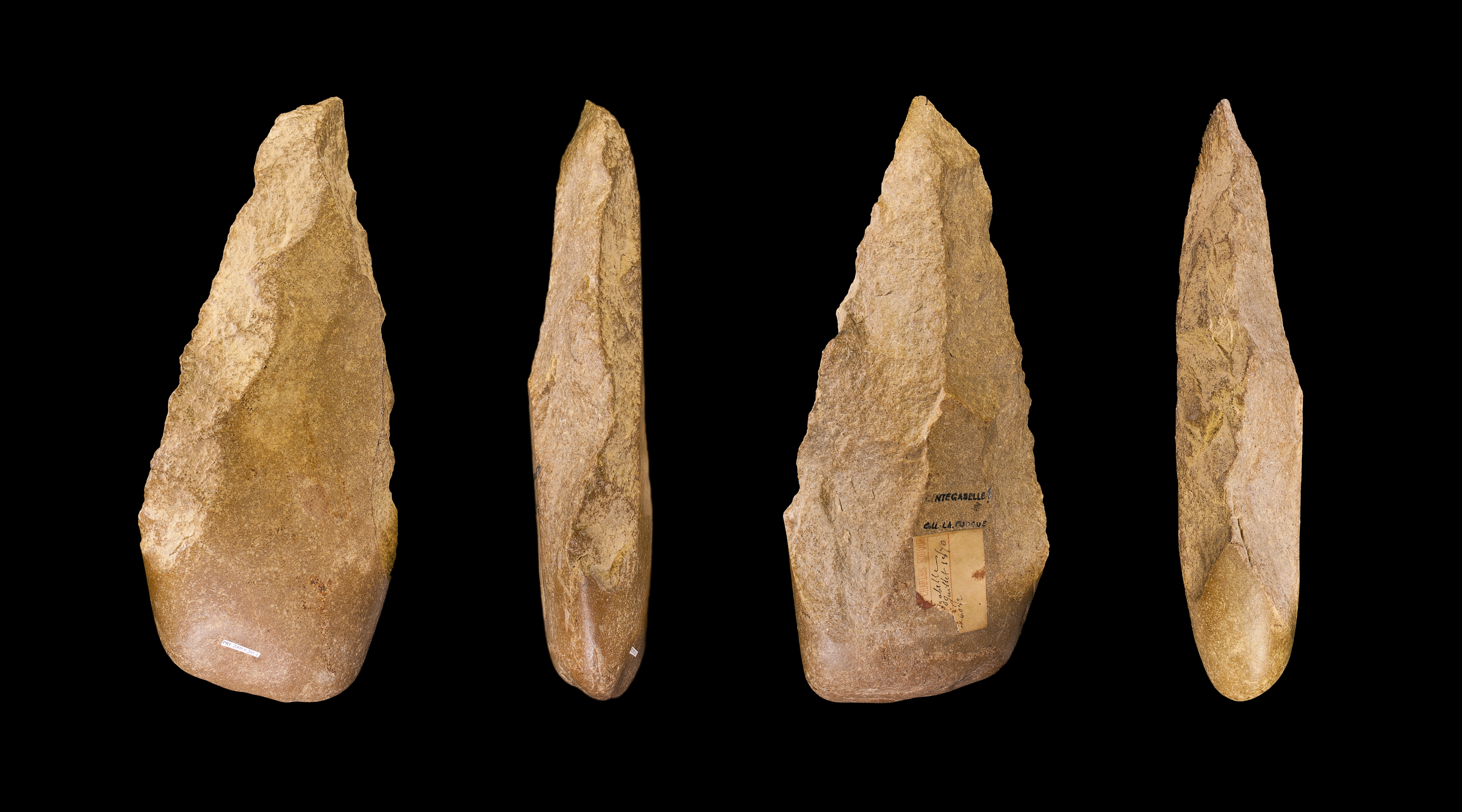
Four views of an Acheulean handaxe

Selected Lower Paleolithic sites from the ROAD database (CC BY-SA 4.0 ROCEEH)

The Lower Paleolithic (or Lower Palaeolithic) is the earliest subdivision of the Paleolithic or Old Stone Age. It spans the time from around 3.3 million years ago when the first evidence for stone tool production and use by hominins appears in the current archaeological record, until around 300,000 years ago, spanning the Oldowan (Mode 1) and Acheulean (Mode 2) lithics industries.

In African archaeology, the time period roughly corresponds to the Early Stone Age, the earliest finds dating back to 3.3 million years ago, with Lomekwian stone tool technology, spanning Mode 1/Oldowan stone tool technology, which begins roughly 2.6 million years ago and ends between 400,000 and 250,000 years ago, with Mode 2/Acheulean technology.

The Middle Paleolithic followed the Lower Paleolithic and recorded the appearance of the more advanced prepared-core tool-making technologies such as the Mousterian. Whether the earliest control of fire by hominins dates to the Lower or to the Middle Paleolithic remains an open question.

== Gelasian ==
The Lower Paleolithic began with the appearance of the first stone tools in the world. Formerly associated with the emergence of Homo habilis, some 2.8 million years ago, this date has been pushed back significantly by finds of the early 2000s, the Oldowan or Mode 1 horizon, long considered the oldest type of lithic industry, is now considered to have developed from about 2.6 million years ago, with the beginning Gelasian (Lower Pleistocene), possibly first used by australopithecine forebears of the genus Homo (such as Australopithecus garhi).

However, even older tools were later discovered at the single site of Lomekwi 3 in Kenya, in 2015, dated to as early as 3.3 million years ago. As such, they would predate the Pleistocene (the Gelasian), and fall into the late Pliocene (the Piacenzian).

The early members of the genus Homo produced primitive tools, summarized under the Oldowan industry, which remained dominant for nearly a million years, from about 2.5 to 1.7 million years ago. Homo habilis is assumed to have lived primarily on scavenging, using tools to cleave meat off carrion or to break bones to extract the marrow.

The move from the mostly frugivorous or omnivorous diet of hominin Australopithecus to the carnivorous scavenging lifestyle of early Homo has been explained by the climate changes in East Africa associated with the Quaternary glaciation. Decreasing oceanic evaporation produced a drier climate and the expansion of the savannah at the expense of forests. Reduced availability of fruits stimulated some proto-australopithecines to search out new food sources found in the drier savannah ecology. Derek Bickerton (2009) has designated to this period the move from simple animal communication systems found in all great apes to the earliest form of symbolic communication systems capable of displacement (referring to items not currently within sensory perception) and motivated by the need to "recruit" group members for scavenging large carcasses.

Homo erectus appeared by about 1.8 million years ago, via the transitional variety Homo ergaster.

== Calabrian ==
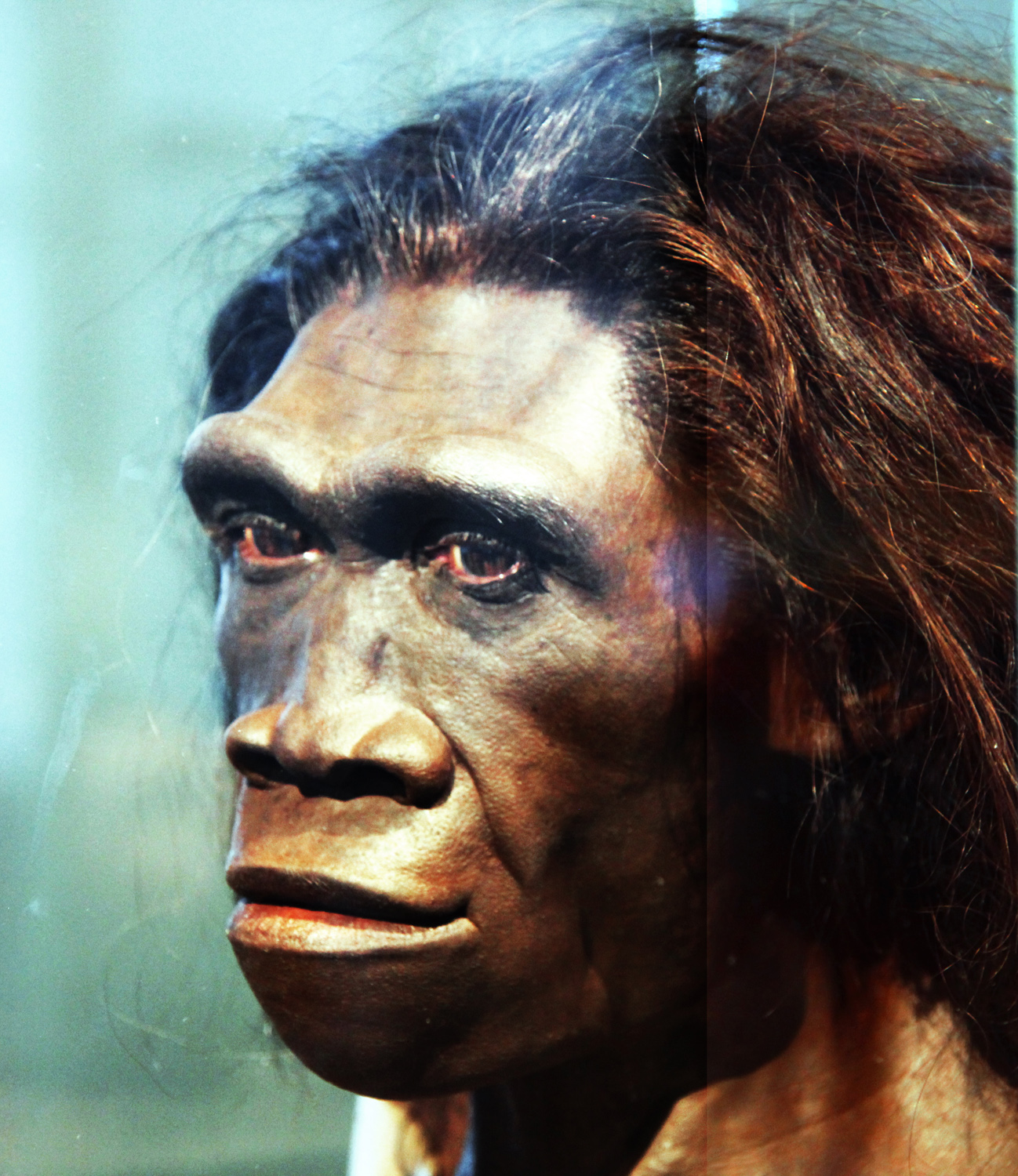
Reconstruction of a female Homo erectus

Homo erectus moved from scavenging to hunting, developing the hunting-gathering lifestyle that would remain dominant throughout the Paleolithic into the Mesolithic. The unlocking of the new niche of hunting-gathering subsistence drove a number of further behavioral and physiological changes leading to the appearance of Homo heidelbergensis by some 800,000–600,000 years ago. As such, Homo rose to the ranks of omnivorous predators (and possibly became hypercarnivores before Homo sapiens again transformed into hypocarnivores). As active hunters, they came in opposition to other, quadruped predators and started living in large groups.

Homo erectus migrated out of Africa and dispersed throughout Eurasia. Stone tools in Malaysia have been dated to be 1.83 million years old. The Peking Man fossil, discovered in 1929, is roughly 700,000 years old.

In Europe, the Oldowan tradition (known in Europe as Abbevillian) split into two parallel traditions, the Clactonian, a flake tradition, and the Acheulean, a hand-axe tradition. The Levallois technique for knapping flint developed during this time.

The carrier species from Africa to Europe was undoubtedly Homo erectus. This type of human is more clearly linked to the flake tradition, which spread across southern Europe through the Balkans to appear relatively densely in southeast Asia. Many Mousterian finds in the Middle Paleolithic have been knapped using a Levallois technique, suggesting that Neanderthals evolved from Homo erectus (or, perhaps, Homo heidelbergensis; see below).

Monte Poggiolo, near Forlì, Italy, is the location of an Acheulian littoral handaxe industry dating from 1.8 to 1.1 million years ago.

The advent of technology and both verbal and non-verbal communication due to transition to group hunting and gathering resulted in the expansion of the parts of the brain associated with these, as well as greater cognition due to it being interlinked with the two. Later, behavioral adaptations to further social life, uncertain food distribution (resulting in need to find and secure food and remember where it could be found) and ecological changes brought about by Homo led to the further expansion of the brain in the areas of problem-solving, memory etc., ultimately leading to the great behavioral flexibility, highly efficient communication, and ecological dominance of humanity. The biological pre-adaptations of the great apes and earlier primates allowed the brain to expand threefold within just 2 to 2.3 million years of the Pleistocene, in response to increasingly complex societies and changing habitats.

== Chibanian ==
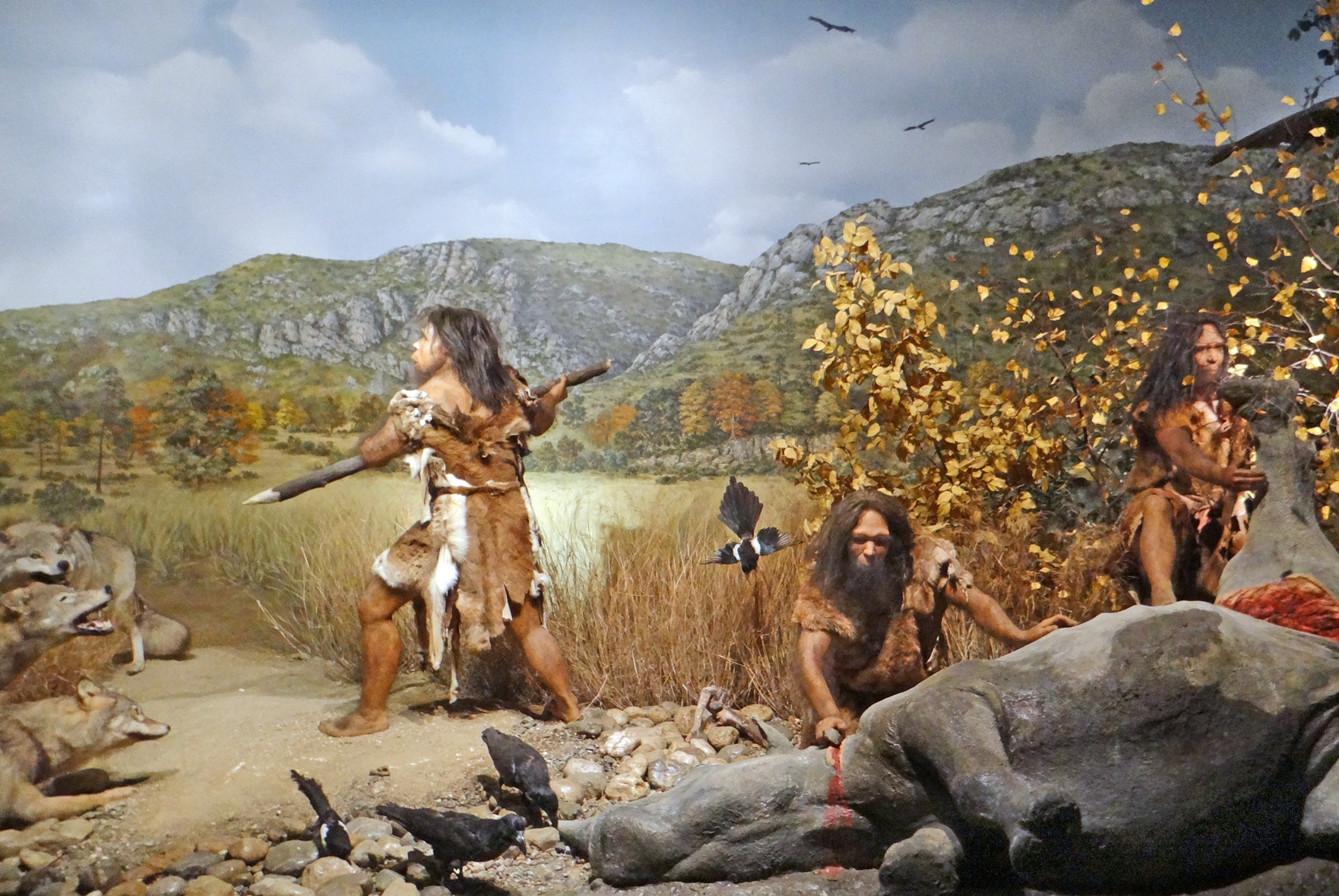
Homo heidelbergensis likely evolved from Homo ergaster (or African H. erectus) following an intense population bottleneck that occurred between 930,000 and 813,000 years ago.

The appearance of Homo heidelbergensis about 600,000 years ago heralds a number of other new varieties, such as Homo rhodesiensis and Homo cepranensis about 400,000 years ago. Homo heidelbergensis is a candidate for first developing an early form of symbolic language. Whether control of fire and earliest burials date to this period or only appear during the Middle Paleolithic is an open question.

Also, in Europe, a type of human appeared that was intermediate between Homo erectus and Homo sapiens, sometimes summarized under archaic Homo sapiens, typified by such fossils as those found at Swanscombe, Steinheim, Tautavel, and Vertesszollos (Homo palaeohungaricus). The hand-axe tradition originates in the same period. The intermediate may have been Homo heidelbergensis, held responsible for the manufacture of improved Mode 2 Acheulean tool types, in Africa, after 600,000 years ago. Flakes and axes coexisted in Europe, sometimes at the same site. The axe tradition, however, spread to a different range in the east. It appears in Arabia and India, but more importantly, it does not appear in southeast Asia.

== Transition to the Middle Paleolithic ==
From about 300,000 years ago, technology, social structures and behaviour appear to grow more complex, with prepared-core technique lithics, earliest instances of burial and changes to hunting-gathering patterns of subsistence. Homo sapiens first appeared about 300,000 years ago, as evidenced by fossils found at Jebel Irhoud in Morocco.

== By region ==
=== South India ===
The Madrasian culture is a prehistoric archaeological culture of the Indian subcontinent, dated to the Lower Paleolithic, the earliest subdivision of the Stone Age. It belongs to the Acheulian industry, and some scholars consider the distinction between the Madrasian and the broader, regional Acheulian tradition defunct.

The Madrasian is characterized by bifacial handaxes and cleavers, but also includes flake tools, microliths and other chopping tools. Most were made from quartzite.

The Madrasian was named for its type site of Attirampakkam (then part of the Madras Presidency), and Pallavaram near to the city of Madras (now renamed as Chennai) in the state of Tamilnadu, discovered by British archaeologist and geologist Robert Bruce Foote in 1863. The oldest tools at Attirampakkam have been dated to 1.5 million years ago using cosmic-ray exposure dating.

=== North India ===
Guy Ellcock Pilgrim, a British geologist and palaeontologist, discovered 1.5 million-year-old prehistoric human teeth and part of a jaw indicating that ancient people, intelligent hominins dating as far back as 1,500,000 ybp Acheulean period, lived in the Pinjore region near Chandigarh. Quartzite tools of the lower Paleolithic period were excavated in this region extending from Pinjore in Haryana to Nalagarh (Solan district in Himachal Pradesh). The lands of Gujarat has been continuously inhabited from the Lower Paleolithic (c. 200,000 BP) period. Evidence of Stone Age habitation has been discovered in riverbeds of Sabarmati, Mahi River and lower Narmada rivers of Gujarat.

== See also ==
- Control of fire by early humans
- Lomekwi, site of the oldest tools discovered
