= Henry Bowreman Foote =

Recipient of the Victoria Cross

Major-General Henry Bowreman Foote VC CB DSO
- Foote in 1960
- Born: 5 December 1904; Ishapore, British India (now in West Bengal, India)
- Died: 11 November 1993 (aged 88); Pulborough, England
- Burial place: St Mary's Church, West Chiltington; 50.954418°N 0.449923°W
- Military career
- Allegiance: United Kingdom
- Branch: British Army
- Service years: 1925–1958
- Rank: Major-General
- Service number: 31938
- Units: Royal Tank Regiment
- Commands: Royal Armoured Corps (1955–58); 11th Armoured Division (1950–53); 7th Armoured Brigade (1949–50); 2nd Royal Tank Regiment (1947–48); 7th Royal Tank Regiment (1942)
- Conflicts: Second World War: Western Desert campaign; Battle of Gazala; Italian campaign
- Awards: Victoria Cross; Companion of the Order of the Bath; Distinguished Service Order; Mentioned in Despatches

Major-General Henry Robert Bowreman Foote, VC, CB, DSO (5 December 1904 – 11 November 1993) was a British Army officer and a recipient of the Victoria Cross, the highest award for gallantry in the face of the enemy that can be awarded to British and Commonwealth forces.

== Early life and education ==
Foote was born on 5 December 1904 in Ishapore, India, the son of Henry Bruce Foote, a major in the Royal Artillery, and his wife Jennie Elizabeth. He was the grandson of the archaeologist and geologist Robert Bruce Foote, often considered the "Father of Indian Prehistory".

Foote's mother died when he was a child and he went to England to board at St Cyprian's School, Eastbourne at the age of four. In 1918 he went to Bedford School where he stayed until 1923.

== Military career ==
Foote entered the Royal Military College, Sandhurst, from where he graduated on 29 January 1925, and was subsequently commissioned into the Royal Tank Corps (later the Royal Tank Regiment).

=== Second World War ===
Foote was a Staff Officer from 1939 to 1942 and a member of the British Army Staff Mission, Washington, D.C. in 1941. In 1942 he was appointed Commanding Officer 7th Royal Tank Regiment and it was in this post that he won the Victoria Cross at the Battle of Gazala.

During the period 27 May to 15 June 1942 in Libya, Lieutenant-Colonel Foote commanded his regiment with outstanding courage and leadership, always being at the crucial point at the right time. On 6 June, although wounded, he continued to lead his battalion from an exposed position on the outside of a tank, and succeeded in defeating the enemy's attempt to encircle two Allied divisions. On 13 June, when a number of Allied tanks had been destroyed, he went on foot, "from one tank to another, to encourage the crews under intense artillery and anti-tank fire". By "his magnificent example the corridor was kept open and the Brigade was able to march through".

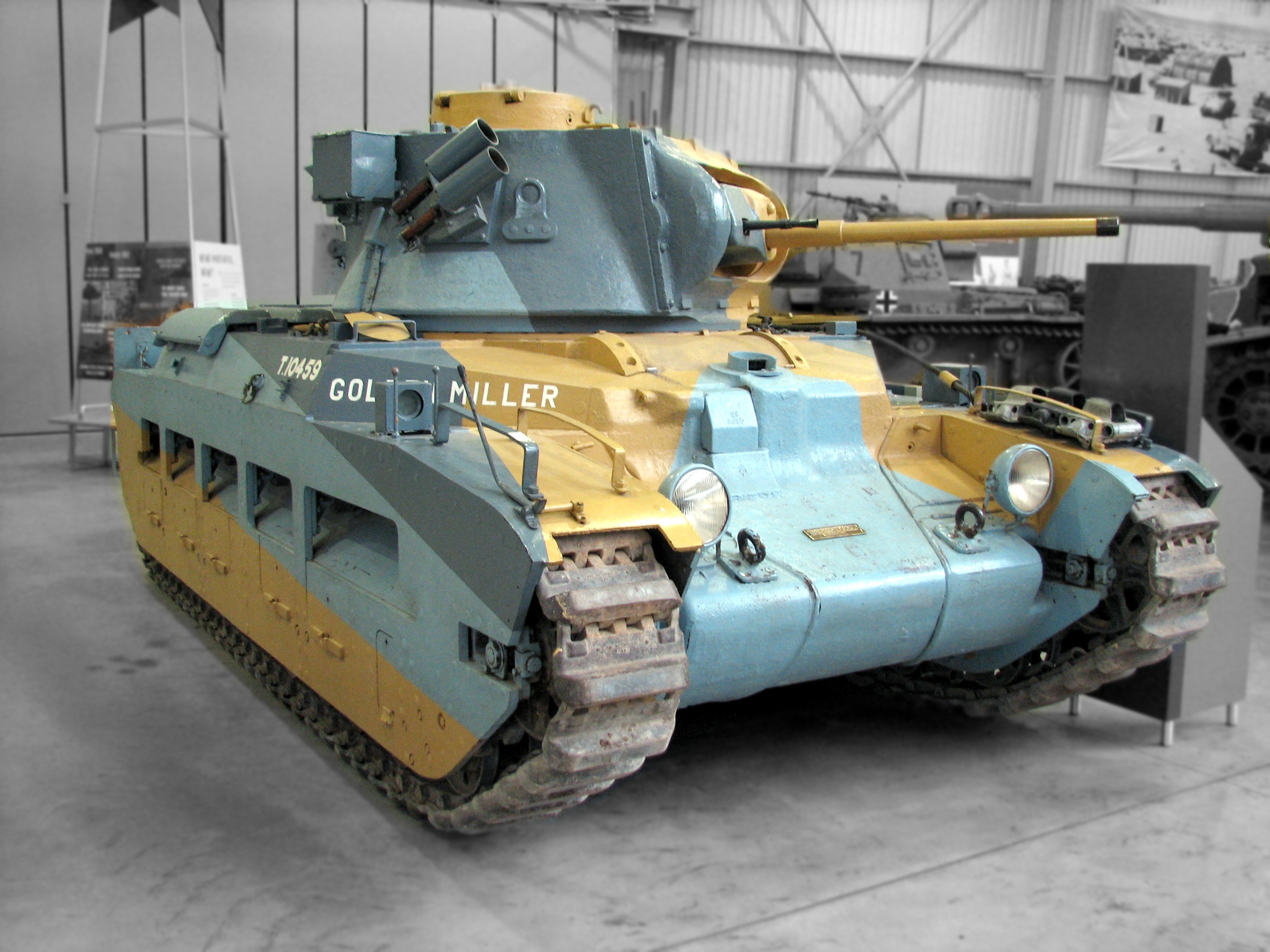
Matilda II tank at The Tank Museum, England, painted to represent a similar tank used by Lieutenant Colonel Foote

Shortly after this, Foote was captured and became a prisoner of war. However, he subsequently escaped and entered Switzerland in April 1944. It was only then that he learned he had been awarded the Victoria Cross. After a period as a General Staff Officer at Allied Forces Headquarters in 1944, he became second-in-command of the 9th Armoured Brigade in 1945.

=== Post-war and senior command ===
After the end of the war, Foote was flying to Berlin to take part in a victory parade when he had to bail out, as the aircraft was about to crash. Consequently, he became a member of the Caterpillar Club, an informal group of those who have been saved from death or serious injury by means of a parachute.

Foote was Brigadier of the Royal Armoured Corps, Middle East Land Forces from 1945 to 1947 and then Officer Commanding 2nd Royal Tank Regiment from 1947 to 1948. He was at the Fighting Vehicles Proving Establishment, at the Ministry of Supply from 1948 to 1949 and commanded the 7th Armoured Brigade from 1949 to 1950 and the 11th Armoured Division from 1950 to 1953. He was Director General of Fighting Vehicles at the Ministry of Supply from 1953 to 1955 and Director, Royal Armoured Corps, at the War Office from 1955 until his retirement in 1958 as major-general.

== Retirement and legacy ==
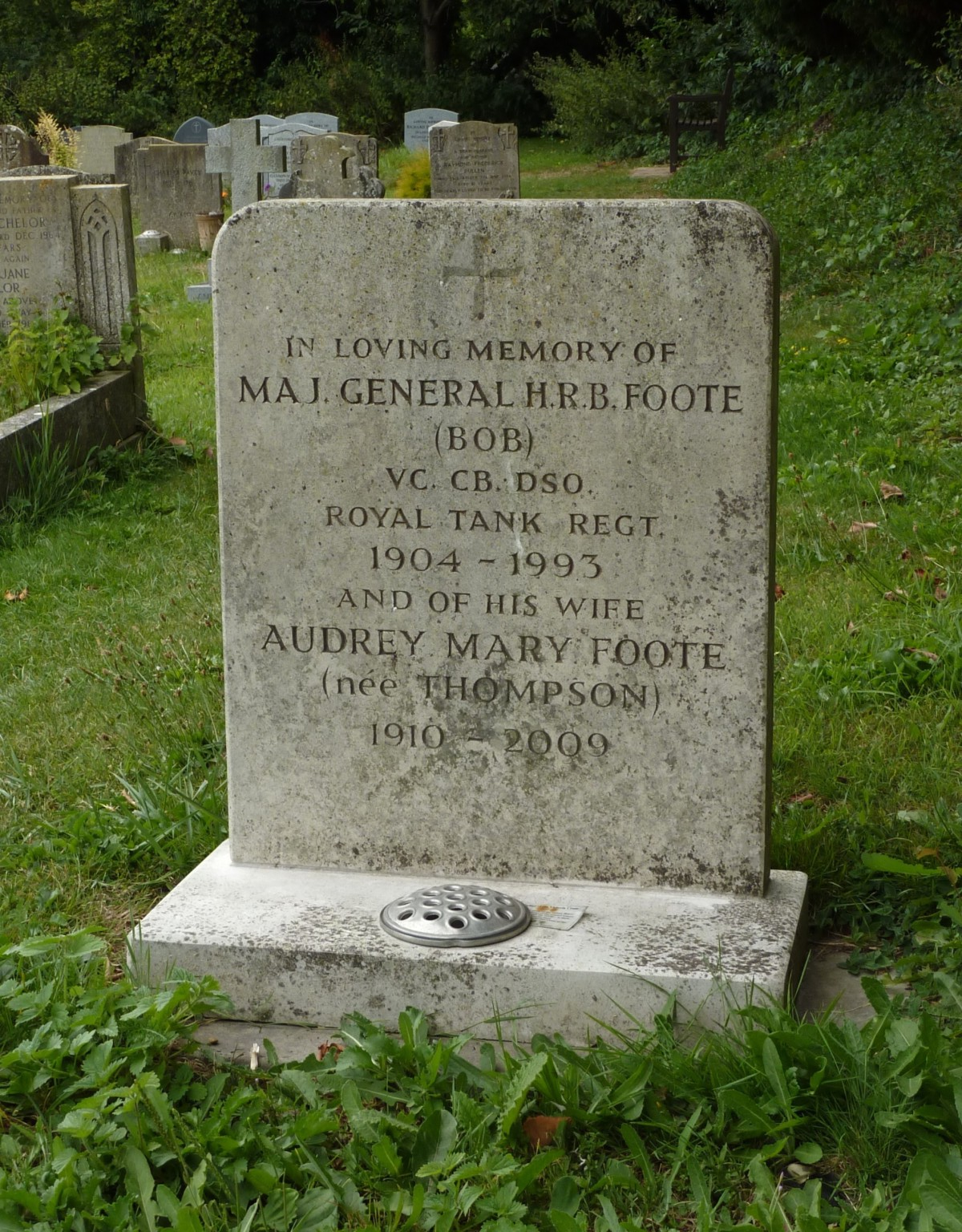
Major General Foote's grave at St Mary's Church, West Chiltington, Sussex, photographed in 2014

After his retirement, Foote was a trustee of The Tank Museum, Bovington until his death. He was featured as a guest on the biographical television programme This Is Your Life on 22 October 1986.

His medals are displayed at the Royal Tank Regiment Museum, Bovington, Dorset.

Military offices
Preceded by Philip Roberts	GOC 11th Armoured Division; 1950–1953	Succeeded by Harold Pyman
