= John Hopps =

John Hopps may refer to:

- John Hopps (physicist), American physicist and politician
- John Alexander Hopps, Canadian inventor of the artificial pacemaker
- John Page Hopps, Unitarian minister and spiritualist
