= Madrasian culture =

Prehistoric archaeological culture of the Indian subcontinent

The Madrasian culture is a prehistoric archaeological culture of South Asia, dated to the Lower Paleolithic, the earliest subdivision of the Stone Age. It belongs to the Acheulian industry, and some scholars consider the distinction between the Madrasian and the broader, regional Acheulian tradition defunct.

The Madrasian is characterized by bifacial handaxes and cleavers, but also includes flake tools, microliths and other chopping tools. Most were made from quartzite.

The Madrasian was named for its type site of Attirampakkam (then part of the Madras Presidency), near to the city of Madras (now renamed as Chennai), discovered by British archaeologist and geologist Robert Bruce Foote in 1863. The oldest tools at Attirampakkam have been dated to 1.5 million years ago using cosmic-ray exposure dating.

== See also ==
- South Asian Stone Age
- Archaeological pottery cultures in India
- Archaeological culture
- Archaeological context
- Chronological dating
- Excavation (archaeology)
