= Gay Street, West Sussex =

Village in West Sussex, England

Coordinates: 50.9739°N 0.4613°W

Gay Street
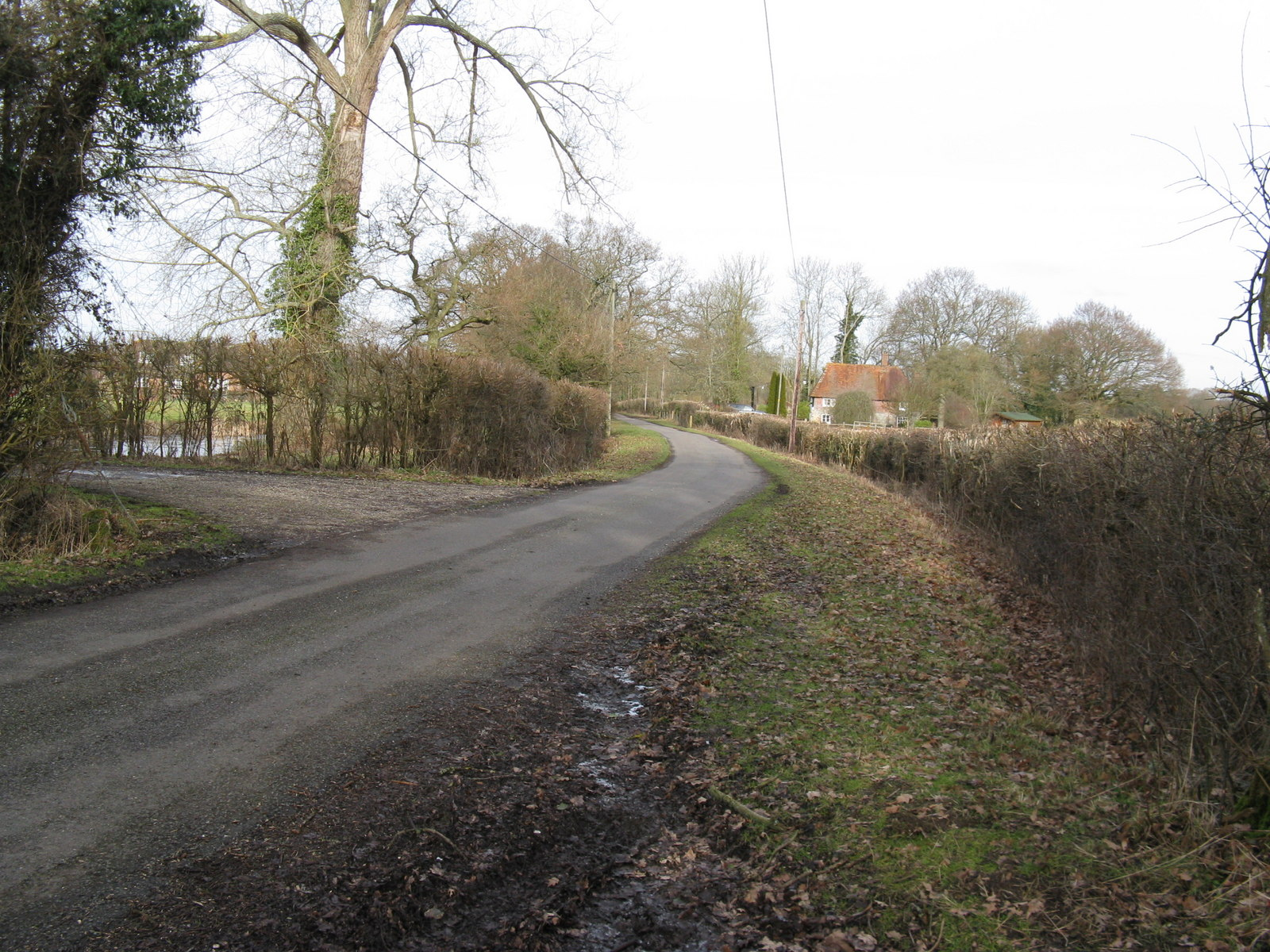

- Location within West Sussex
- OS grid reference: TQ081205
- Civil parish: West Chiltington
- District: Horsham
- Shire county: West Sussex
- Region: South East
- Country: England
- Sovereign state: United Kingdom
- Police: Sussex
- Fire: West Sussex
- Ambulance: South East Coast
- UK Parliament: Arundel and South Downs

Gay Street is a hamlet in the Horsham District of West Sussex, England. It lies on the North Heath to West Chiltington road 1.9 miles (3.1 km) northeast of Pulborough.

The signpost for nearby Gay Street Lane, relating in modern language to homosexuality has often been stolen or damaged.
