= Tyssen =

Tyssen may refer to:

== People ==
- Amherst Tyssen (1843–1930), English lawyer and author
- Charles Daniel-Tyssen (1856–1940), English first-class cricketer
- John Tyssen (1889–1953), British pilot
- William Tyssen-Amherst, 1st Baron Amherst of Hackney (1835–1909), British politician

== Other uses ==
- Tyssen Islands, Falkland Islands
