= St Mary's Church, West Chiltington =

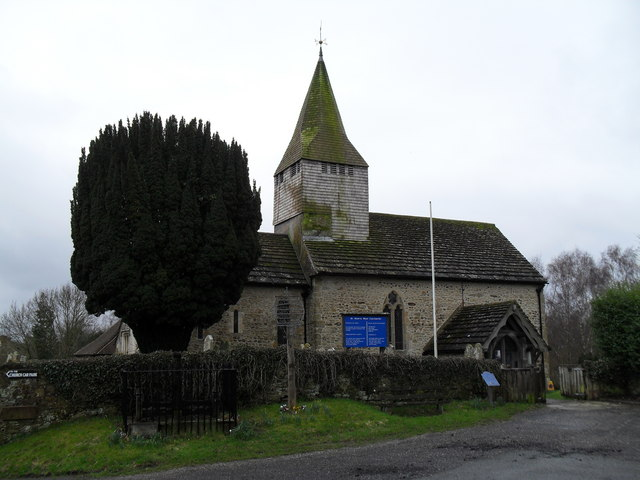
- The church from the northeast
- St Mary's Church, West Chiltington
- 50.954232°N 0.449305°W
- Location: Church Street, West Chiltington, West Sussex RH20 2JW
- Country: England
- Denomination: Anglican

History
- Founded: 11th century
- Dedication: Mary

Architecture
- Style: Norman

Administration
- Province: Canterbury
- Diocese: Chichester
- Archdeaconry: Chichester
- Deanery: Storrington
- Parish: West Chiltington

Clergy
- Archbishop: Justin Welby, Archbishop of Canterbury, Primate of all England
- Bishop: The Right Reverend Doctor Martin Warner SSC
- Rector: Fr Stephen Merriman SSC

St Mary's Church is the Grade I listed Anglican parish church of West Chiltington, a village in the Horsham district of West Sussex, England. The 12th-century building, described as a "showpiece" and "the most attractive part" of the Wealden village, retains many features of historical and architectural interest. These include an exceptionally long hagioscope or squint from the south aisle into the chancel, a porch which may be Sussex's oldest, and a well preserved and extensive scheme of wall paintings. In the Sussex volume of The Buildings of England, Ian Nairn says that the appearance of the church gives "a very happy, unexpected effect, like a French village church".

== History ==
The Domesday Book of 1086 records a church in the village then called Cilletone. It is uncertain whether any part of this earlier building was incorporated into the present church, which is believed to date from the first half of the 12th century; but Ian Nairn suggested that the walls of the nave and chancel are "probably 11th-century", and the Saxon-era building almost certainly occupied the same site. The three-bay south aisle was added around 1200, and the chancel arch is of a similar age. A chantry chapel was added in the early 13th century, and another chapel on the south side of the chancel was built a century later. A spire was built in 1602.

The church was restored between 1880 and 1882 by the Steyning architect Charles Dalby. The dedication to St Mary was unknown until a will of 1541 was discovered, in which John Sayrle said his body was to be "buried in the churchyard of Our Lady of Chiltington". Other documents relating to the church include one which states that more than 3,700 people have been buried in the churchyard.

== Architecture ==
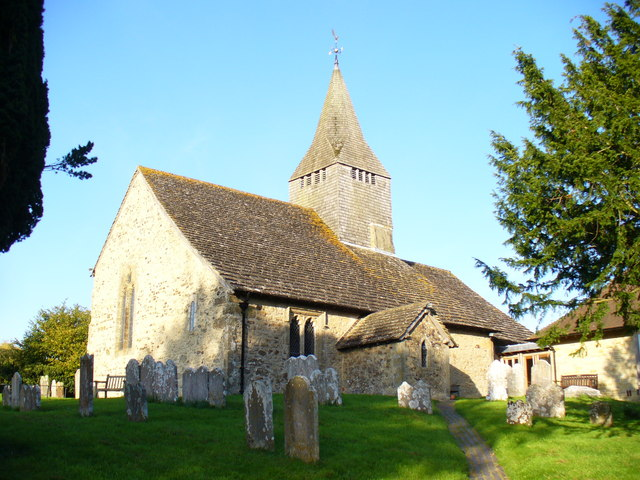
The church has a chancel, nave and spire.

St Mary's Church is considered an architectural highlight in a village variously described as "pleasant", "dull", "attractive" and "a showpiece". The first Lord Ponsonby of Shulbrede claimed that "if it was in Italy, people would make pilgrimages to it". Built between 1100 and 1150, its style is typical of the time—representing the "Transitional Norman" period when Norman architecture was giving way to Early English Gothic.

The church consists of nave, chancel and a south aisle separated from the nave by a three-bay arcade. The chancel arch is in the form of two arches, one inside the other, designed to accommodate the 5-foot (1.5 m) thick east wall, which supports the belfry. The pointed arches of the south arcade are supported by round piers with varying capitals. In the angle of the chancel and south aisle there is an early thirteenth-century chapel. Two round-headed Norman windows remain; the west window of the south aisle and the centre window in the north window of the chancel. The chancel east window has the only stained glass in the church. The "fantastically long" hagioscope, about 9 feet (2.7 m) in length and resembling a tunnel, runs from the south aisle into the chancel through one of the pillars of the arcade and the chancel arch. These architectural features allowed worshippers in the aisle to see the bread and wine being consecrated during the Celebration of the Eucharist. The church is roofed with Horsham slabs, a common material in churches in the area. The oak shingled spire of 1602 rests partly on the masonry of the old belfry, or bell turret, and partly on the east wall of the nave.

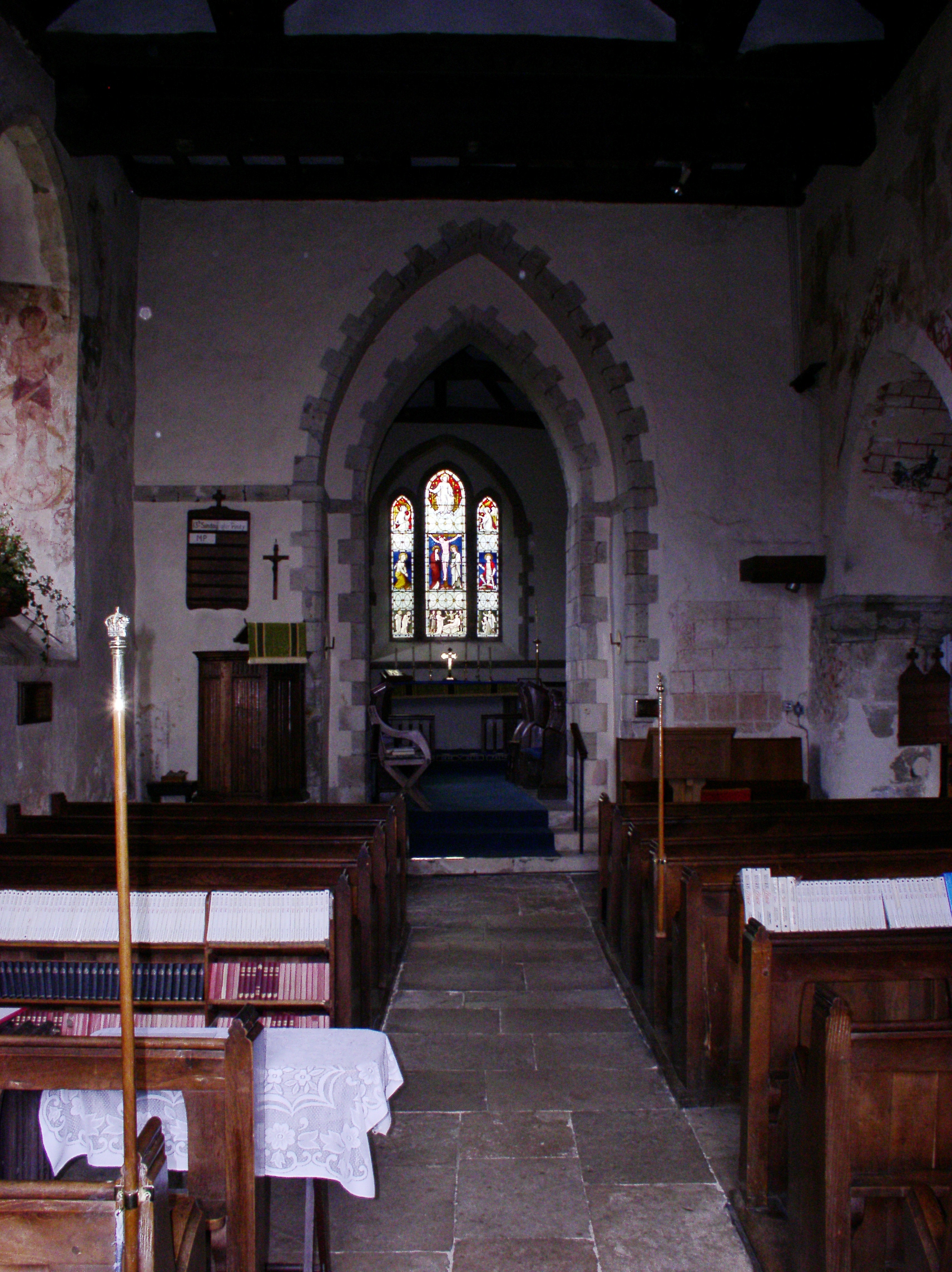
St Mary's Church, West Chiltington – nave and chancel arch

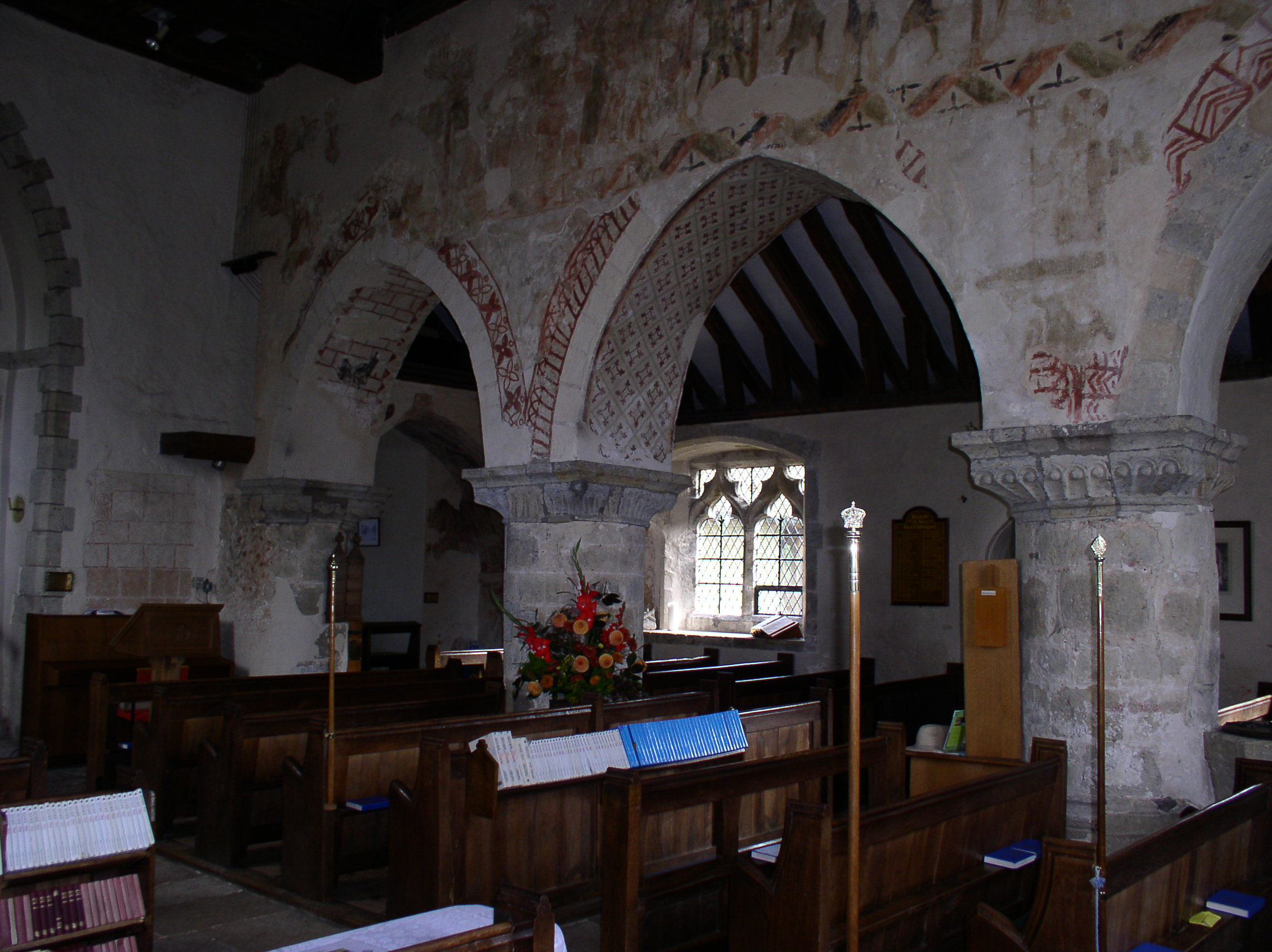
St Mary's Church, West Chiltington – nave and arcade

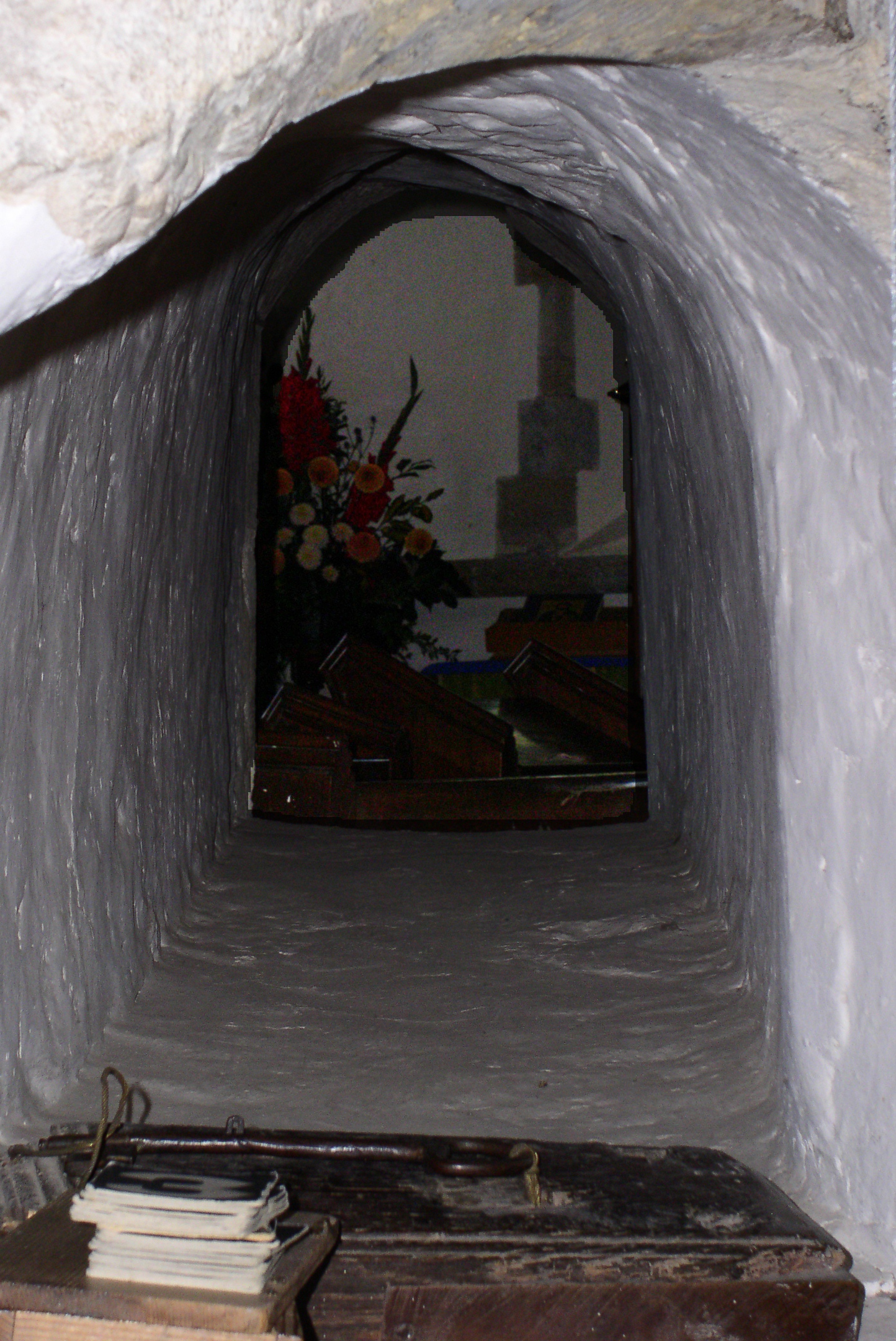
St Mary's Church, West Chiltington – hagioscope or squint

== Bells ==
A survey of Sussex church bells published in 1864 recorded four in place at St Mary's Church. Each had a diameter of 34 1/2 inches (88 cm) and weighed 7 long cwt 23 lb (807 lb or 366 kg). The first bell bore the inscription Iohannes Xpi Care and an armorial shield. The second had the words our hope is in the lord above the initials and date r e 1602. The third bore the names of two 17th-century churchwardens, John Brooker and Edward Jupp, in their old spellings: Iohn Broker Edward Ivpp Chvrch Wardens 1665 wp. rp. The fourth was inscribed Roger Tapsel c i w e 1626. Another countywide survey undertaken in the 1960s stated that the second bell (of 1602) had been recast by the Mears & Stainbank firm, who had also supplied a new bell inscribed hear my prayer o god and dated 1950. This is confirmed by a brass plate dated the same year, which shows that the restoration and installation of the new bell commemorated the late John Junius Morgan, formerly of Spod Shitterton Nyetimber.

== The wall paintings ==
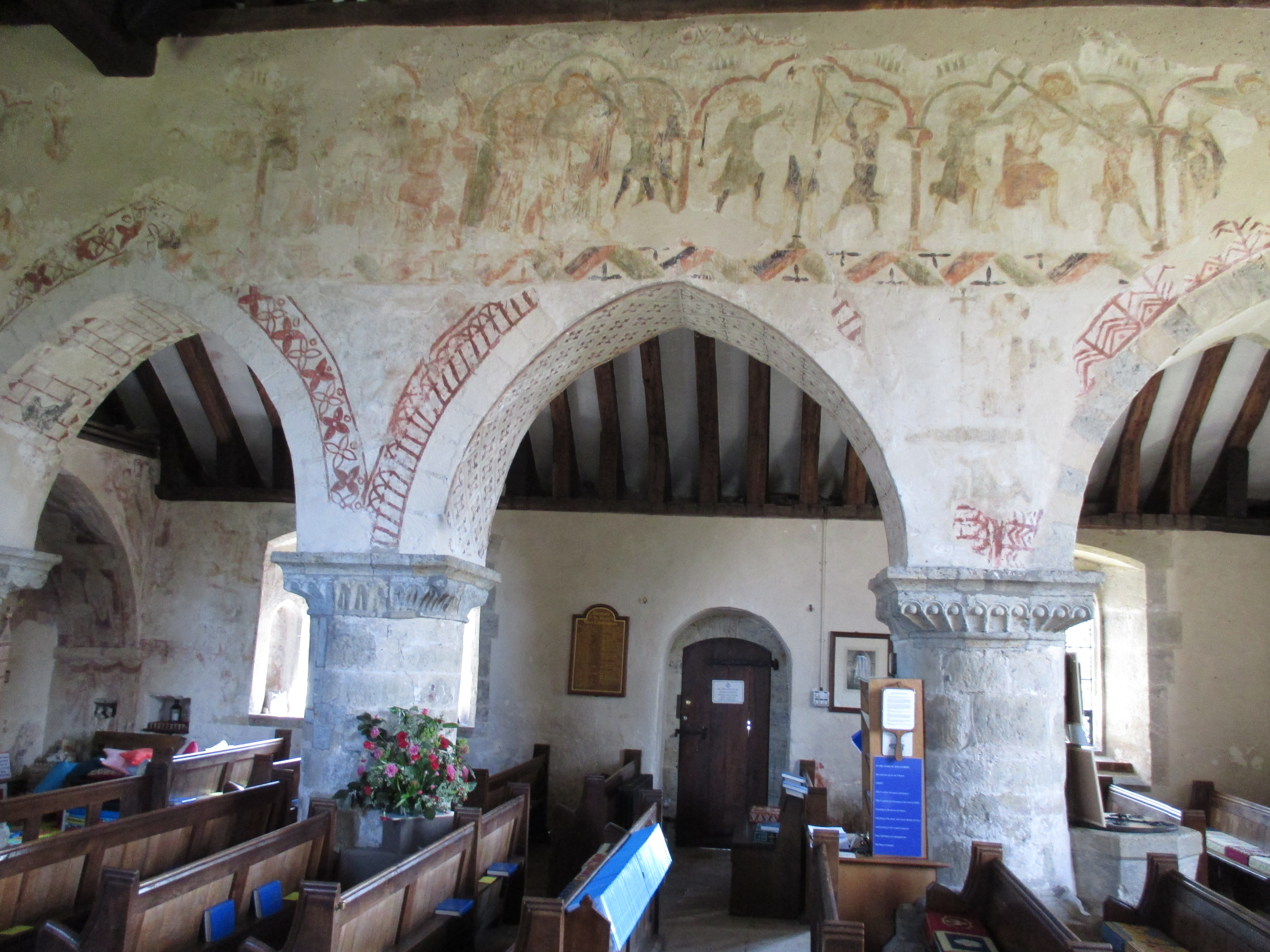
The south arcade with its frescoes

=== Introduction ===
The wall paintings in St Mary's were uncovered in 1882. They were treated by Professor Tristram in 1931 and later preserved by Mrs Eve Baker. Dating from the 12th to 14th centuries they consist of two 13th-century series with biblical themes together with earlier and later images. Nairn comments that "the ensemble can still give a ghostly echo of the original effect".

=== Description ===
The oldest significant painting is a medallion at the east end of the south aisle. Uncovered in 1967 this has a central design of a cross in the form of an endless knot of rope. The south aisle also has 12th-century pictures of angels and Apostles.

The nave has a series of Passion scenes along the south wall and Nativity scenes on the north. The scenes on the south wall are: the Entry into Jerusalem, the Last Supper, Christ washing the disciples' feet, the Betrayal of Christ, the Flagellation of Christ, Christ carrying his cross, the Crucifixion and the angel at the tomb.

The scenes on the north wall are: the Annunciation, the Visitation, the Nativity itself, and an angel and shepherd. The subjects of the last two scenes are uncertain.

There are 14th-century decorative designs on the easternmost pillar of the south arcade and in the soffits of its arches.

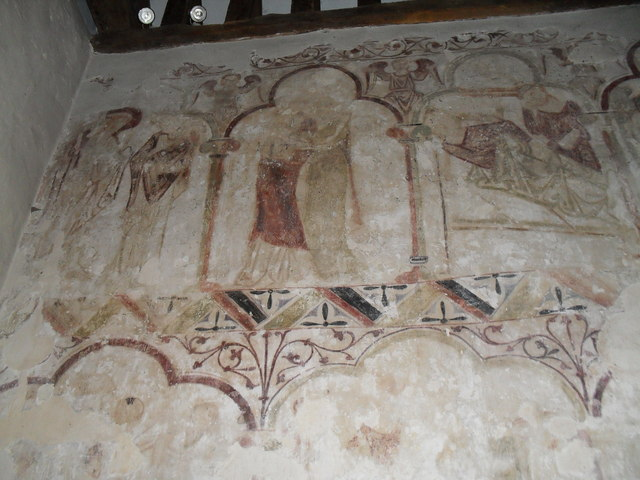
The Annunciation and Visitation

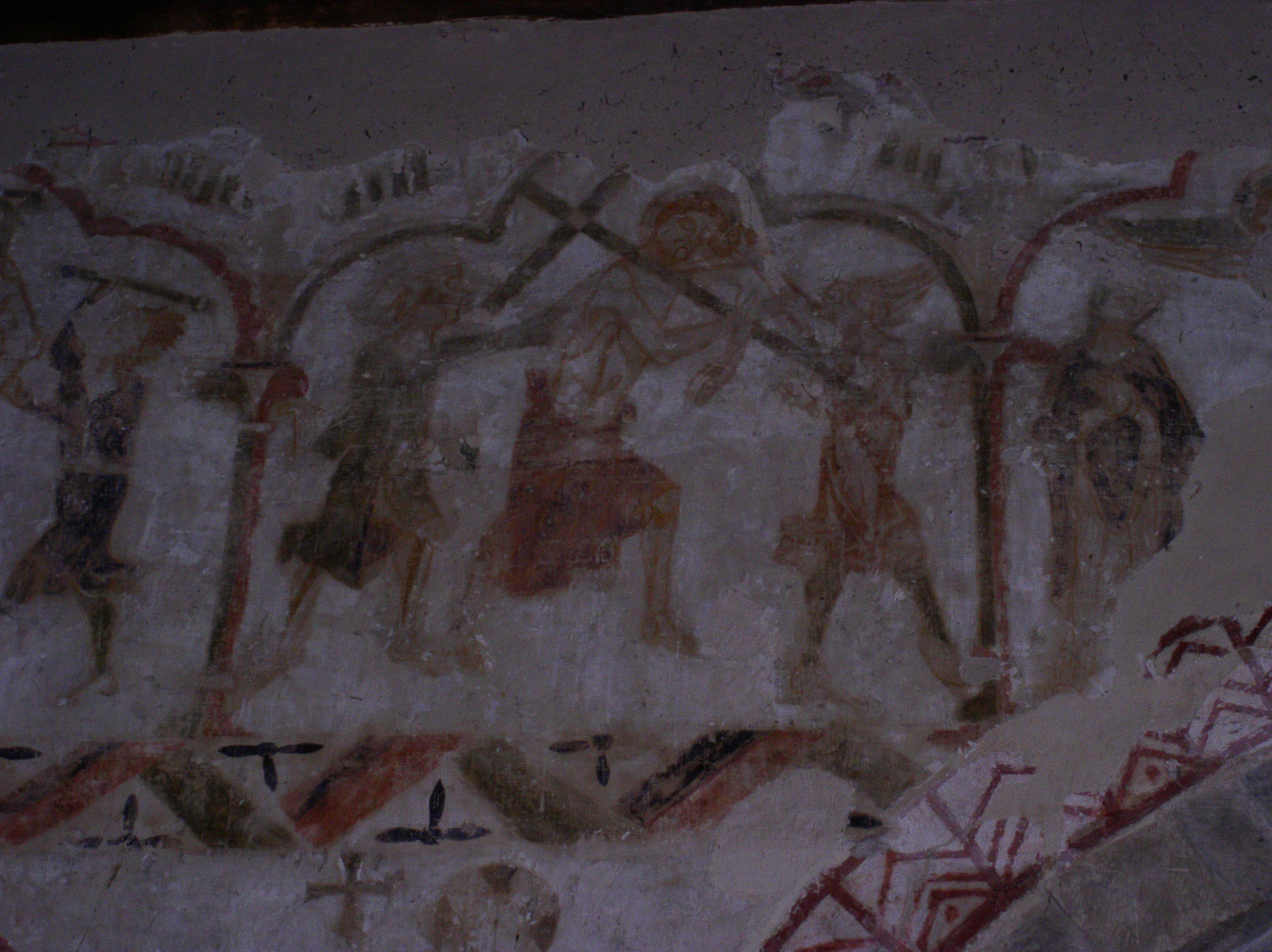
Christ carrying the cross

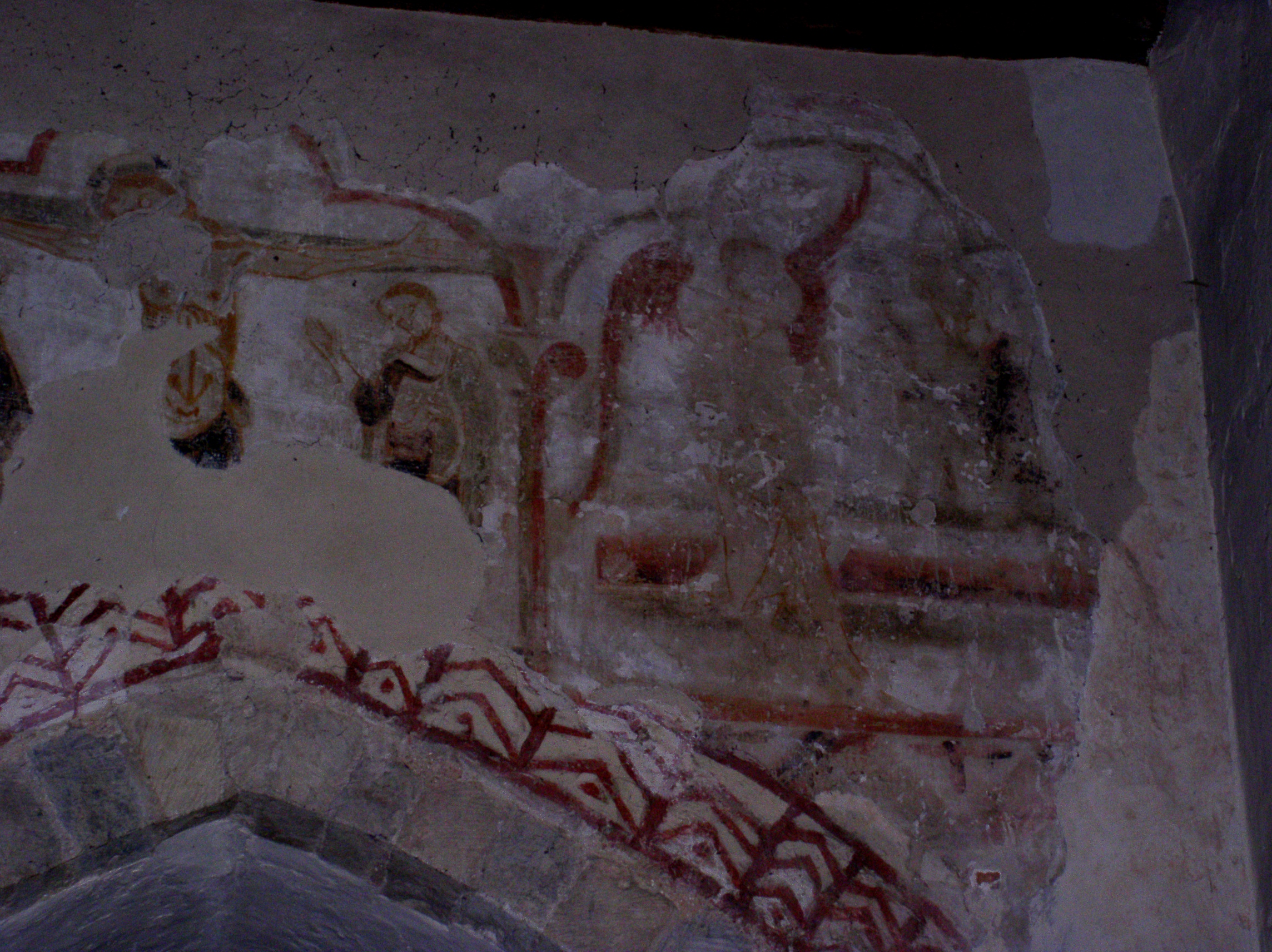
The Crucifixion and angels at the tomb

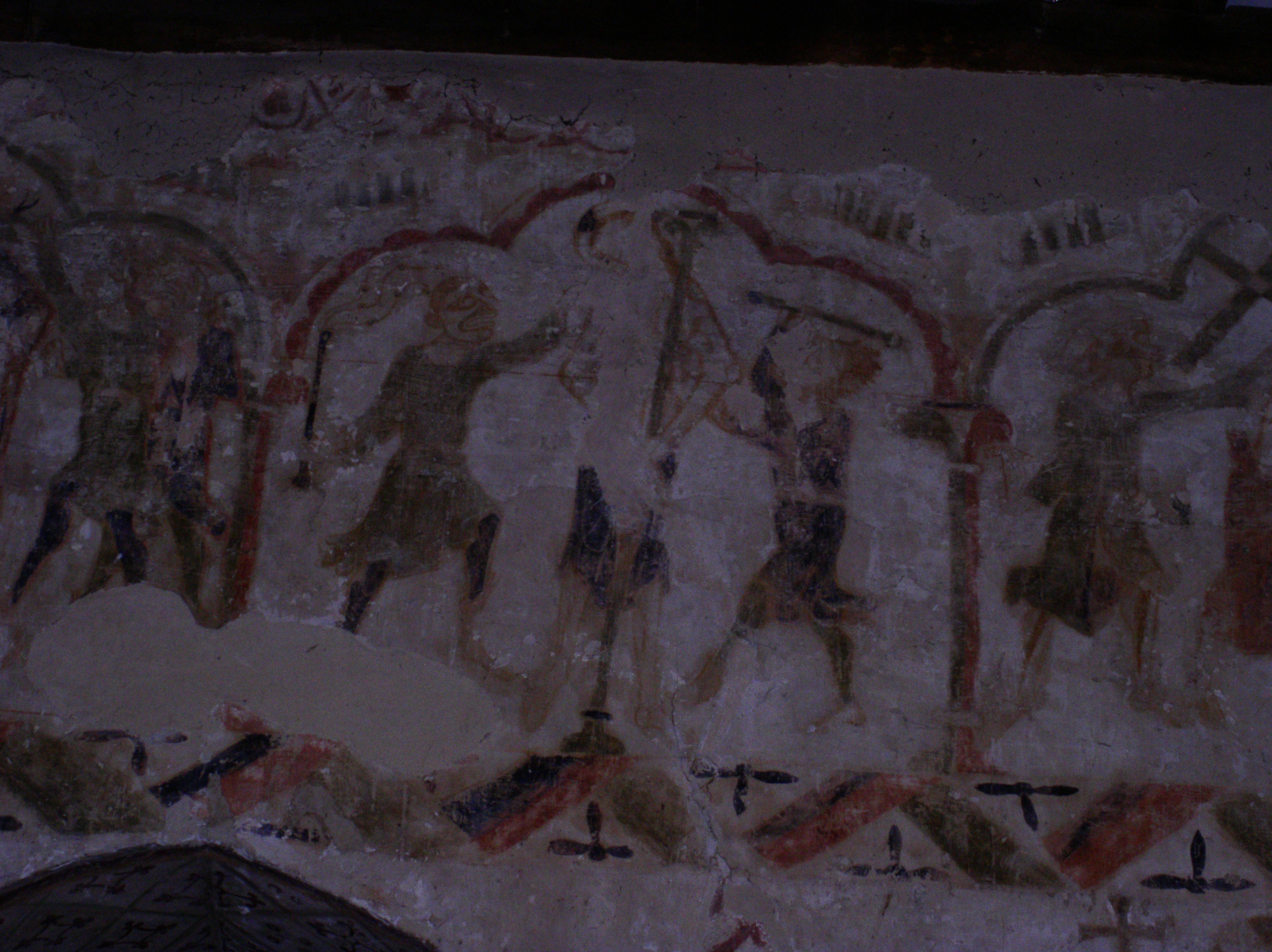
Flagellation of Christ

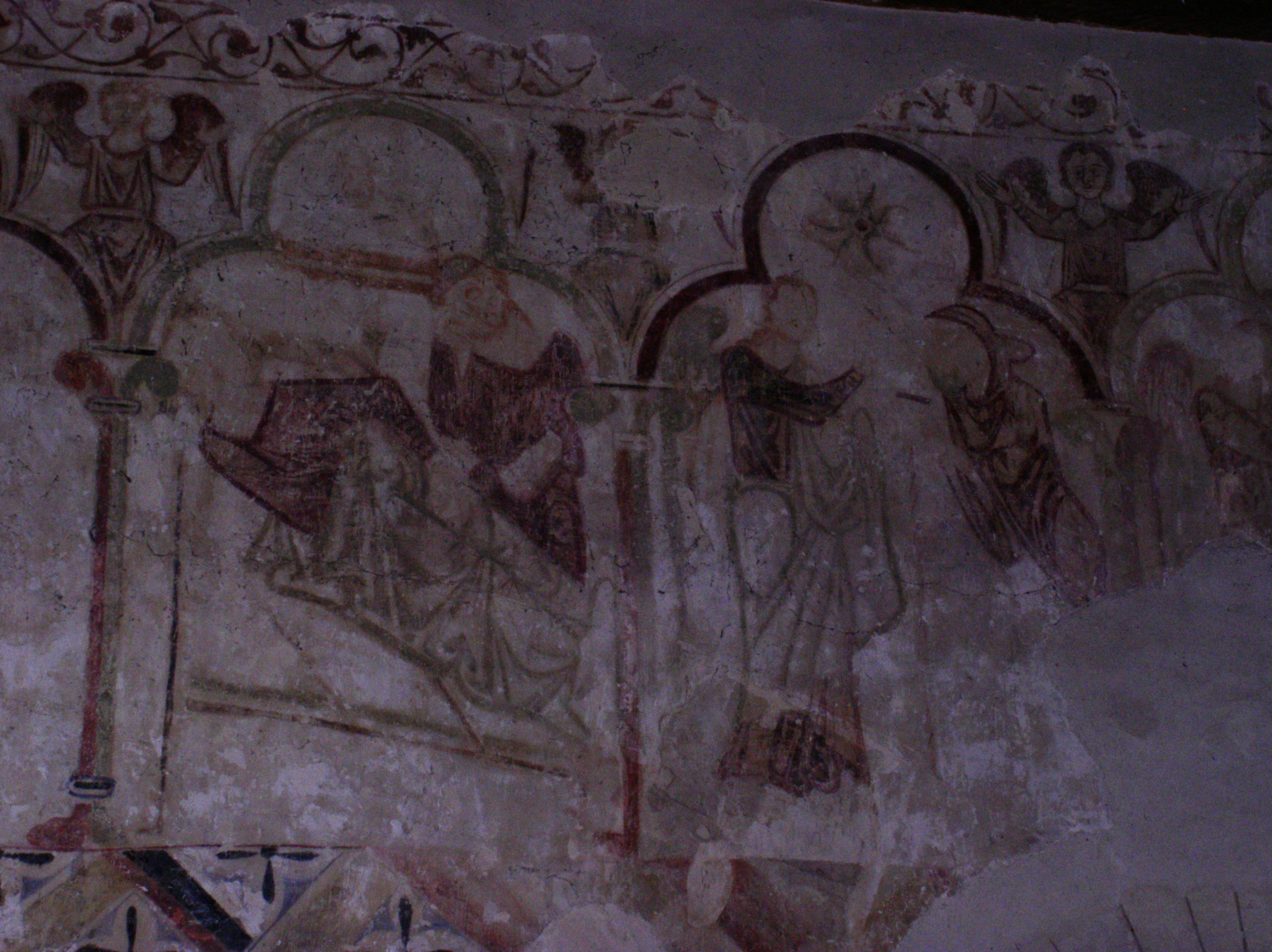
Nativity and angel with shepherd

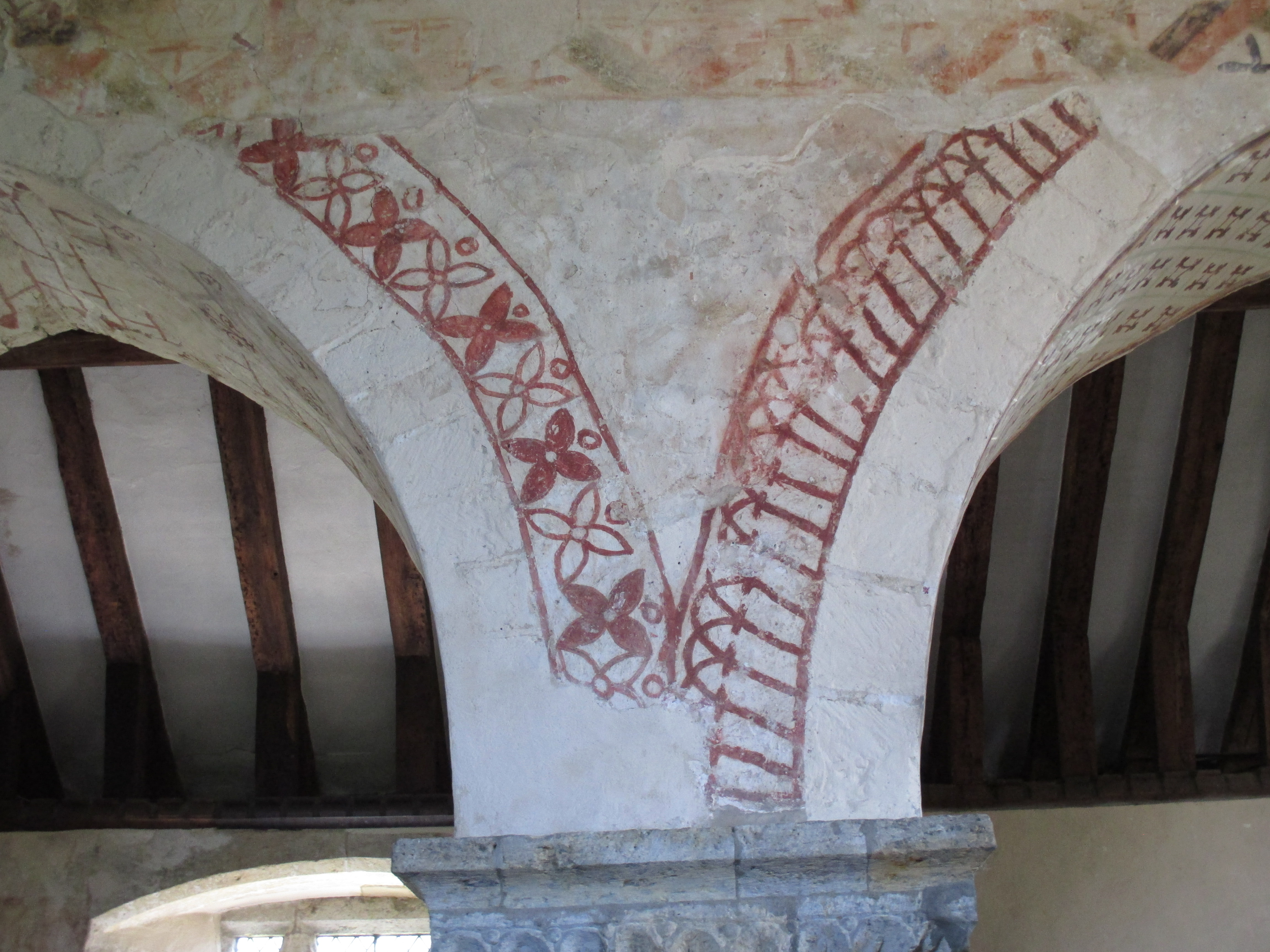
Decorated spandrel

=== Christ standing on a wheel ===
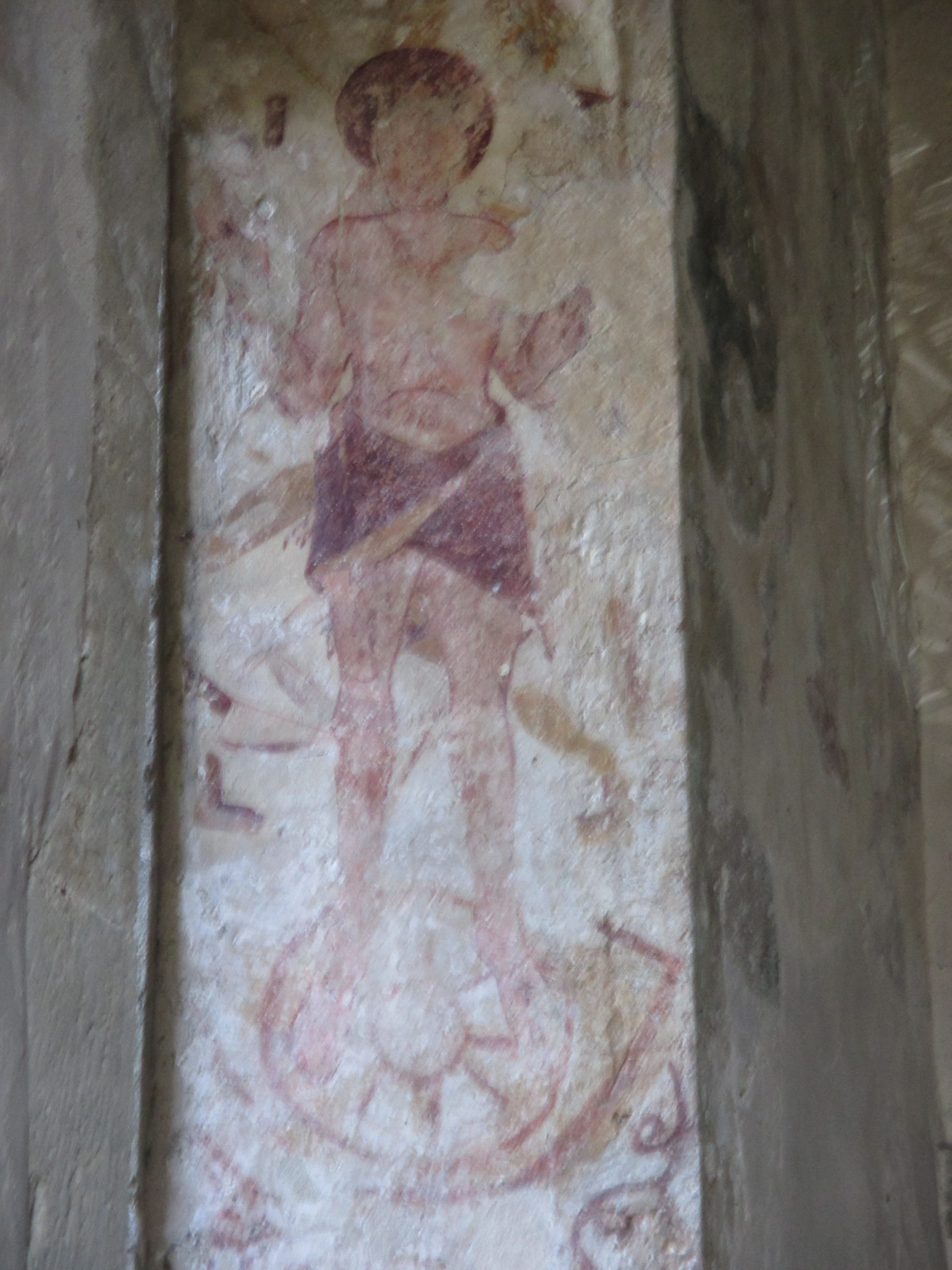
St Mary's Church, West Chiltington – Christ standing on a wheel

In the splay of the north nave window is a 14th-century depiction of Christ standing on a wheel and surrounded by the tools of different trades. He has his arms raised, apparently to better display his wounds. The tools include tailor's shears, a butcher's cleaver, a carpenter's square and a weaver's shuttle. Above Christ's right shoulder there are two dice. Similar paintings are found in many other medieval English parish churches. The subject has been much discussed in the past but has been conclusively identified as a warning against breaking the Sabbath. The message is that by working on Sunday one inflicts new wounds on Christ.

== The church today ==
The church was listed at Grade I by English Heritage on 15 March 1955. Such buildings are defined as being of "exceptional interest" and greater than national importance. As of February 2001, it was one of 38 Grade I listed buildings, and 1,726 listed buildings of all grades, in the district of Horsham.

The extensive parish covers the rural area around West Chiltington village and the larger suburban village of West Chiltington Common. The neighbouring hamlets of Gay Street, Broadford Bridge and Coneyhurst are also included.

Sunday Services 8:00am 1662 Book of Common Prayer Holy Communion, 10:00am Sung Parish Mass. Wednesday 9:30am Exposition of the Blessed Sacrament, 10am BCP Holy Communion. Thursday 9:30am Rosary, 10am said mass. The church is open daily for visitors. On the first Thursday of every month, The Village Cafe - Refresh! is open from 10:30am in the Church Hall; offering Tea, Coffee and Cake for free a time to talk and be refreshed.

== See also ==
- Grade I listed buildings in West Sussex
- List of places of worship in Horsham (district)
- St John the Baptist's Church, Clayton
- St Botolph's Church, Hardham

== Bibliography ==
- Beevers, David; Marks, Richard; Roles, John (1989). Sussex Churches and Chapels. Brighton: The Royal Pavilion, Art Gallery and Museums. ISBN 0-948723-11-4.
- Coppin, Paul (2006). 101 Medieval Churches of West Sussex. Seaford: S.B. Publications. ISBN 1-85770-306-5.
- Daniel-Tyssen, Amherst (1864). "The Church Bells of Sussex". Sussex Archaeological Collections. 16. Lewes: George P. Bacon (for the Sussex Archaeological Society). doi:10.5284/1085280.
- Nairn, Ian; Pevsner, Nikolaus (1965). The Buildings of England: Sussex. Harmondsworth: Penguin Books. ISBN 0-14-071028-0.
- Pé, Diana (2006). Mid Sussex Church Walks. PP (Pé Publishing). ISBN 0-9543690-2-5.
- Rouse, E. Clive (1991). Medieval Wall Paintings (4th ed.). Princes Risborough: Shire Books. ISBN 0-7478-0144-4.
- St Mary's Church (2007). The Church of Saint Mary, West Chiltington. West Chiltington: St Mary's Church.
- Salter, Mike (2000). The Old Parish Churches of Sussex. Malvern: Folly Publications. ISBN 1-871731-40-2.
- Vigar, John (1986). Exploring Sussex Churches. Rainham: Meresborough Books. ISBN 0-948193-09-3.
- Wales, Tony (1999). The West Sussex Village Book. Newbury: Countryside Books. ISBN 1-85306-581-1.
- Whiteman, Ken; Whiteman, Joyce (1998). Ancient Churches of Sussex. Seaford: S.B. Publications. ISBN 1-85770-154-2.
- Wilkinson, Edwin (2003). Looking Towards West Sussex Country Churches. Seaford: S.B. Publications. ISBN 1-85770-277-8.
