= Nutbourne =

Nutbourne may refer to:

- Nutbourne, Chichester, West Sussex, England
- Nutbourne, Horsham, West Sussex, England
