= Peter Percival =

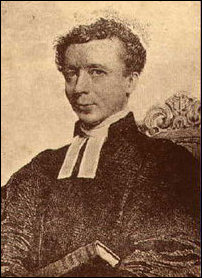
- Born: 24 July 1803
- Died: 11 July 1882 (aged 78); Yercaud, Salem district, Madras Presidency, British India (now Tamil Nadu, India)
- Occupations: Missionary, religious educator
- Relatives: Robert Bruce Foote, son–in–law

Peter Percival (24 July 1803 – 11 July 1882) was a British born missionary and educator who opened religious schools in Sri Lanka and South India during the British colonial era.) During his stay in Jaffna, he led the effort to translate the Authorized King James Version of Bible into the Tamil language, working with the Tamil scholar Arumuka Navalar – a Shaiva Hindu. Percival's work influenced Robert Bruce Foote. Percival began his career in British held Sri Lanka and Bengal as a Wesleyan Methodist missionary. He was instrumental in starting and upgrading a number of Christian schools within the Jaffna peninsula. After returning to England, he converted to Anglicanism. Subsequent to his posting in South India, he severed his association with the Anglican Missionary Society that had sent him to India and worked as an educator in Presidency College in Madras Presidency.

First edition of Tamil proverbs with their English translationcompiled by Rev Percival was published in 1842. Proverbs were arranged in alphabetical order.In its preface, written on Christmas day, Jaffna, Percival wrote, "It is presumed that the translation generally conveys the sense of the original, although not always with its force, nor with the elegance that might be desired." The second edition of this work was published in 1874, with a cumulative count of 6156 proverbs. Percival also published English-Tamil and English-Telugu dictionaries as well as a number of books on Indian culture and religion. He died in 1882 in Yercaud in present-day Tamil Nadu.

== Career ==
=== British Ceylon ===
Peter Percival, aged 23, was sent to Jaffna peninsula in British Ceylon (now Sri Lanka) in 1826 by the Wesleyan Methodist Mission, with concerns whether his appointment is risky in "an atmosphere of immoral heathenism". At his arrival the missionary society and its efforts had not produced results expected by their original expectations and goals. A number of previous missionaries had returned to Europe after short stints due to illness. Percival spent most of his early adult life in Jaffna peninsula until 1851, with a short stint in Bengal (1829–32).

Percival's views and style brought him conflict with fellow missionaries such as Joseph Roberts. After Roberts left, Percival led the missionary efforts in Jaffna district. Percival, states Findlay's records of the mission, then had conflicts with Ralph Stott. Percival favored Christian schools rather than the direct evangelization approach of Stott. Between 1834 and 1836, his efforts led to the opening of religious schools – including those for girls – and the building of St. Paul's chapel in Jaffna. Some of these schools were later upgraded to colleges. As a Protestant missionary, Percival favored the teaching of Christian texts in the local vernacular (Tamil) rather than English or Portuguese.

During his tenure as the principal of Jaffna Central College, he hired his former student Arumuka Navalar as a teacher. They worked together between 1841 and 1848, and collaborated with him to translate the Bible into Tamil. Percival's preference of education over evangelism created friction with other Wesleyan missionaries but it also influenced the educational practices of all those who were trying to improve the literary levels of 19th-century Sri Lankan Tamil society.

=== England ===
In 1851, he returned to England with the intention of coming back to Ceylon but due to differences with the Methodist hierarchy in London, he renounced Methodism. In 1852, he was ordained deacon by the Anglican Bishop of London. During the next two years, he worked as a lecturer at St Augustine's College, Canterbury, teaching a course about India and its religions.

=== British India ===
In 1854, he went to Madras, Madras Presidency in southern British India with the Society for the Propagation of the Gospel in Foreign Parts, an Anglican missionary society. He became an Anglican priest ordained by Bishop of Madras in 1855. In 1856 after becoming the Registrar of Madras University and Professor of Sanskrit and Vernacular Literature in Presidency College, he severed his relationship with the missionary society.

== Later life ==
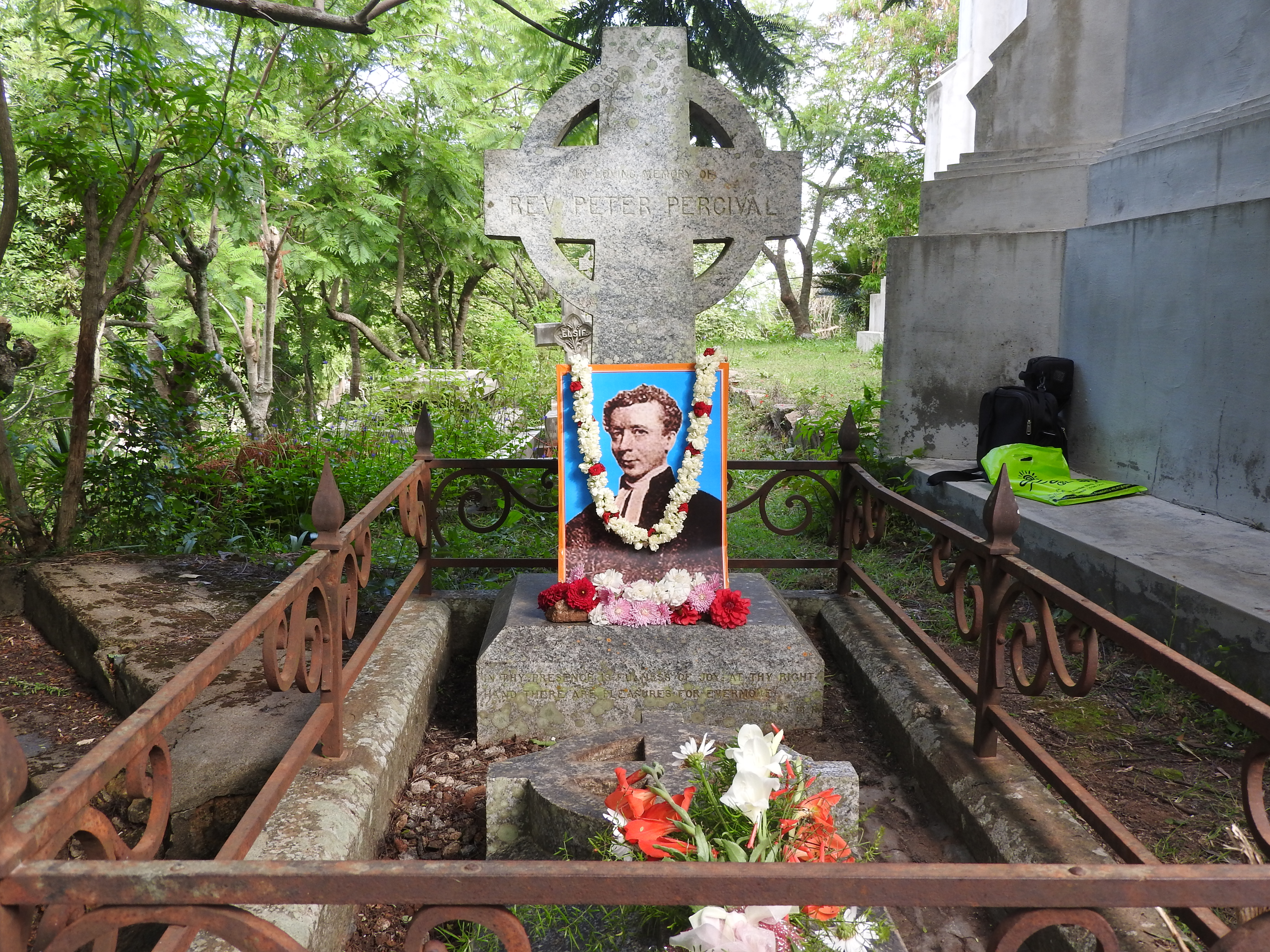
Grave Peter Percival in the cemetery of the Holy Trinity Church at Yercaud

In India he was known a scholar in Tamil and Telugu. After having published the Tamil translation of the Bible, he wrote the book Land of the Veda: India Briefly Described in some of its Aspects, Physical, Social, Intellectual and Moral. His other publications include, a book on Tamil proverbs in English, English-Tamil and English-Telugu dictionaries, and a bilingual Tamil and Telugu journal Dinavartamani. He also translated into English, Tamil proverbs and the literary work of Avvaiyar, a Tamil poet.

His daughter married pioneering geologist and archaeologist Robert Bruce Foote. Peter Percival and Robert Bruce Foote were lifelong friends and shared their interest in Indian culture, history and linguistics. He retired to the hill station town of Yercaud and died in 1882. Graves of both Peter Percival and Robert Bruce Foote were found in the cemetery of the Holy Trinity Church at Yercaud in 2009.

== Cited literature ==
- Armstrong, Samuel T (1863). The Missionary herald:Volume 59. American Board of Commissioners for Foreign Missions.
- Findlay, George Gillanders; Holdsworth, William West (1924), The history of the Wesleyan Methodist Missionary Society, vol. 5, London:Epworth Press, ISBN 1-140-06774-5
- Jones, Kenneth W.; Hudson, D. Dennis (1992). Religious controversy in British India: dialogues in South Asian languages. SUNY. ISBN 0-7914-0828-0.
- Heidman, Eugene (2001). From Mission to Church: The Reformed Church in America Mission to India. Wm. B. Eerdmans Publishing Co. ISBN 0-8028-4900-8.
- Zvelebil, K. (1974). Tamil literature, Volume 10. A History of Indian literature: Dravidian literatures. Otto Harrassowitz Verlag. ISBN 978-3-447-01582-0.
