= Dinavartamani =

Indian journal

Dinavartamani began in 1855 as bilingual in Tamil and Telugu with a separate edition of Telugu started in 1856. Dinavartamani was a weekly edited by Peter Percival and issued from Madras. Its Telugu edition in 1856 had a circulation of 700 copies. The journal was started by a committee of Civil and Military Services officers to diffuse social, political and literary information among the Tamil people. Its first number was published in October 1855.
