= Holy Trinity Church, Yercaud =

Church in Tamil Nadu, India

Coordinates: 11.773994°N 78.210847°E

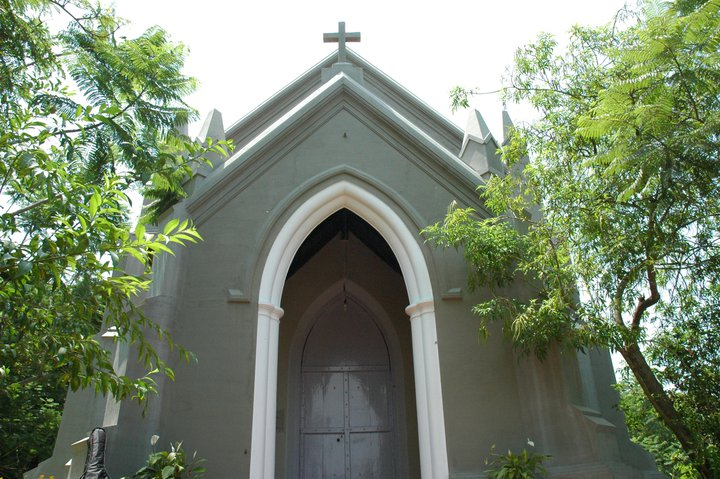
Holy Trinity Anglican Church, Yercaud

CSI Holy Trinity Church in Yercaud, Tamil Nadu, India was built in 1834 and was rebuilt in 1853 after a damaging accident. It belongs to the Church of South India Trust Association.

The churchyard also has the grave of Peter Percival (1803–1882). He was a missionary, linguist and a pioneering educator in Sri Lanka and South India.

Also present is the memorial of Percival's son-in-law Robert Bruce Foote, (1834–1912), the British archaeologist and geologist who is considered the "Father of Indian Prehistory".
