= Prepared-core technique =

Means of producing stone tools

Animation illustrating the preparation of a Levallois core and the removal of a Levallois flake (of predetermined form)

Prepared-core technique

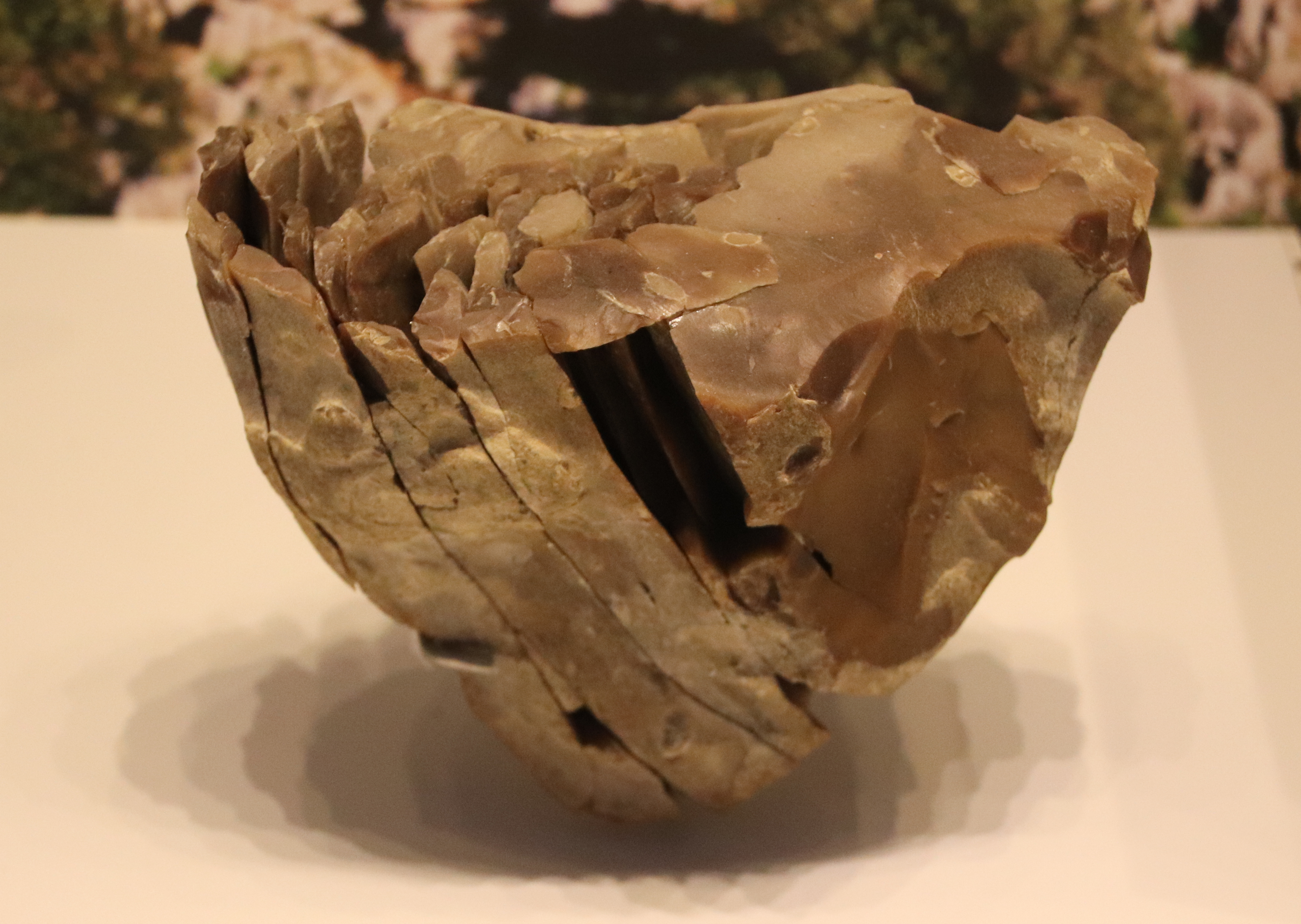
Flint stone core for making blades (reassembled from blades for illustration purposes), Boqer Tachtit, Negev, Israel, circa 40000 BP.

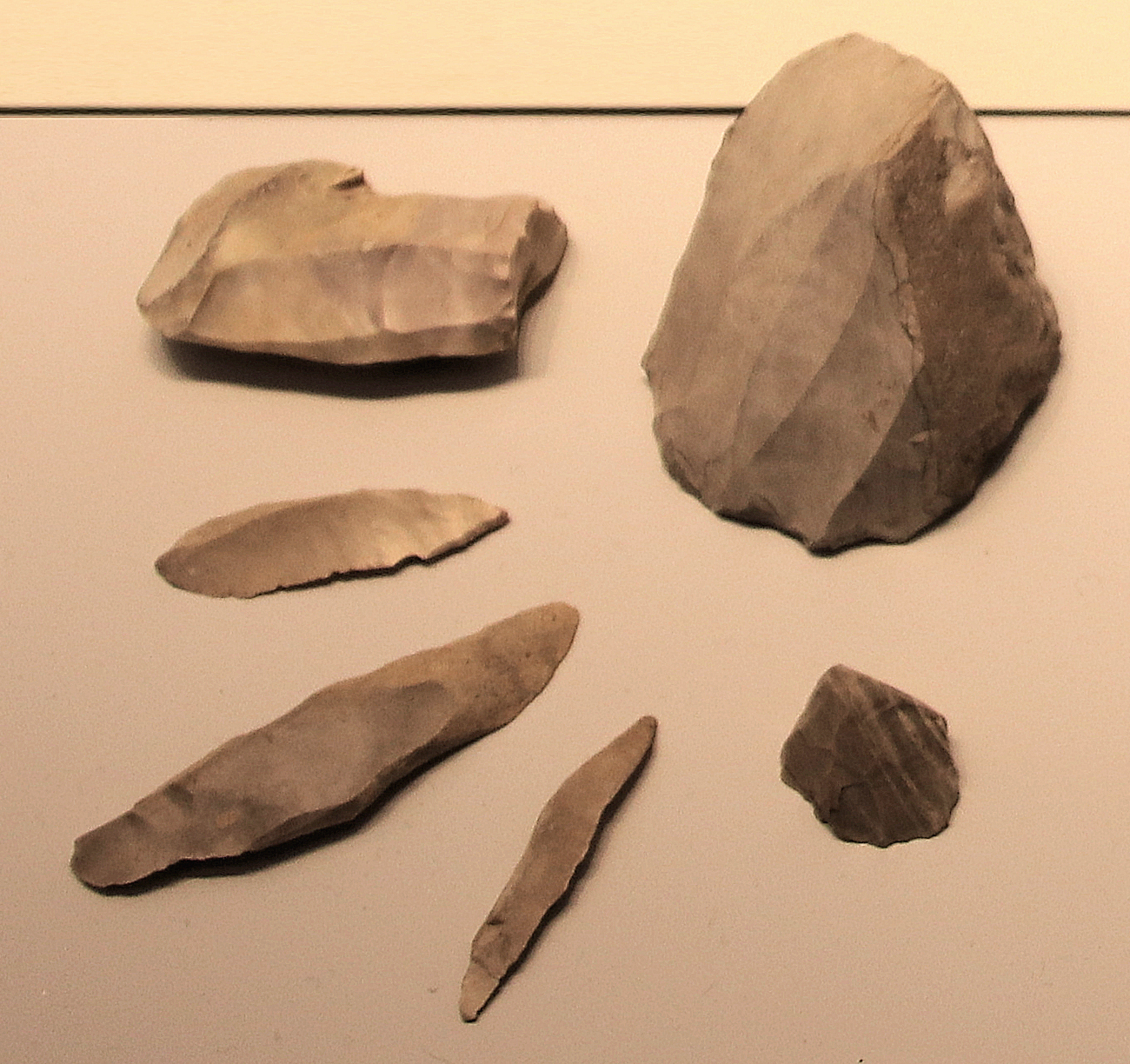
Kebaran culture microliths from a prepared core, 22000-18000 BP.

The prepared-core technique is a means of producing stone tools by first preparing common stone cores into shapes that lend themselves to knapping off flakes that closely resemble the desired tool and require only minor touch-ups to be usable.

In contrast to the production of core tools like handaxes, where cores themselves were the end product shaped and trimmed down by removal of flakes, in prepared-core technique large flakes are the product and the core is used to produce them. This shift made it faster and more resource-efficient, as multiple tools could be struck from a single piece of starting material.

Prepared core preparation techniques are grouped under the label Mode 3 technology. The best-known prepared core reduction method is the Levallois technique

Prepared core technology was likely invented independently multiple times at different locations. The regular use of Prepared core technology is associated with large-brained hominins such as Homo heidelbergensis, Neanderthals and modern humans. Its widespread use is the defining characteristic of the Middle Stone Age period in Africa and the Middle Palaeolithic (~300.000 - 40.000 years ago) in Europe.

== Bibliography ==
- Bringmans, P.M.M.A., Vermeersch, P.M., Gullentops, F., Groenendijk, A.J., Meijs, E.P.M., de Warrimont, J.-P. & Cordy, J.-M. 2003. Preliminary Excavation Report on the Middle Palaeolithic Valley Settlements at Veldwezelt-Hezerwater (prov. of Limburg). Archeologie in Vlaanderen - Archaeology in Flanders 1999/2000 VII: 9-30.
- Bringmans, P.M.M.A., Vermeersch, P.M., Groenendijk, A.J., Meijs, E.P.M., de Warrimont, J.-P. & Gullentops, F. 2004. The Late Saalian Middle Palaeolithic "Lower-Sites" at Veldwezelt-Hezerwater (Limburg - Belgium). In: Le Secrétariat du Congrès (eds), Acts of the XIVth UISPP Congress, University of Liège, Belgium. September 2-8, 2001. Section 5: The Middle Palaeolithic. Oxford. British Archaeological Reports (BAR) International Series 1239: 187-195.
