= West Chiltington =

Village and parish in West Sussex, England

Coordinates: 50.95559°N 0.44897°W

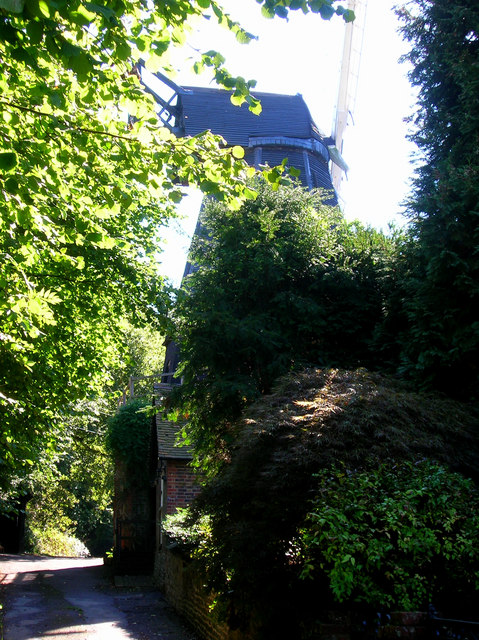
- Meetens mill

- Location within West Sussex
- Area: 17.33 km^{2} (6.69 sq mi)
- Population: 3,315 2001 Census; 3,377 (2011 Census)
  - Density: 191/km^{2} (490/sq mi)
- OS grid reference: TQ090184
  - London: 40 miles (64 km) NNE
- Civil parish: West Chiltington
- Shire county: West Sussex
- Region: South East
- Country: England
- Sovereign state: United Kingdom
- Post town: PULBOROUGH
- Postcode district: RH20
- Dialling code: 01798
- Police: Sussex
- Fire: West Sussex
- Ambulance: South East Coast
- UK Parliament: Arundel and South Downs
- Website: http://www.wchilt-parishcouncil.org.uk/

West Chiltington is a village and civil parish in the Horsham district of West Sussex, England. It lies on the Storrington to Broadford Bridge road, 2.6 miles (4.2 km) north of Storrington.

The parish covers an area of 1733 hectares (4279 acres). In the 2001 census 3315 people lived in 1476 households, of whom 1383 were economically active. At the 2011 Census the population of Nutbourne was included and totalled 3,375.

== Places of worship ==
St Mary's Church is the grade I listed Anglican parish church.

== Sport ==
The village has football and croquet teams and is home to West Chiltington & Thakeham Cricket Club. The cricket club played in the Sussex Premier League for the first time in 2026. Not all sports are played at the village's Recreation Ground next to the Village Hall. There is also a flourishing tennis club adjacent to the recreation ground. West Chiltington Golf Club was another sporting enclave within the parish, but this closed in early 2016 after steadily losing revenue following damage due to two poor winters.

== Village band ==
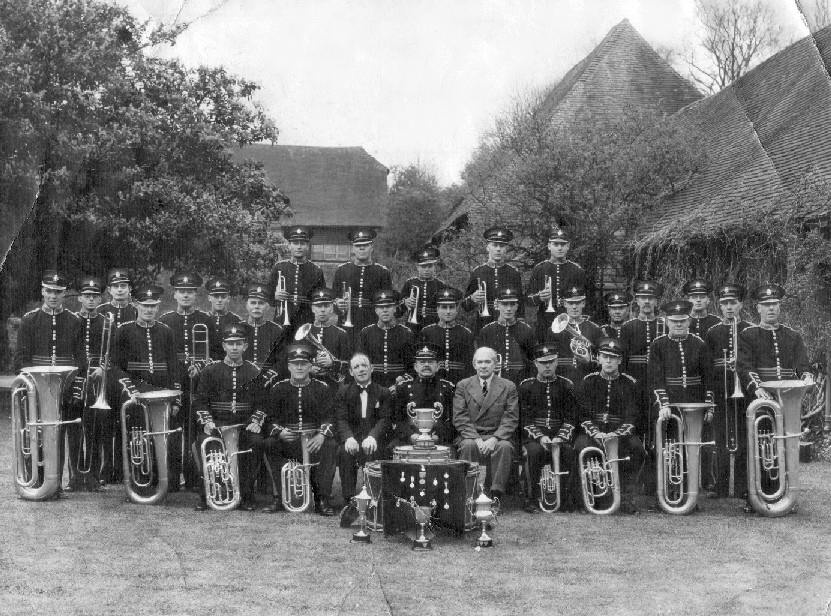
West Chiltington Silver Band in 1937

West Chiltington Silver Band was formed in 1908 by landscape gardener and Salvation Army bandsman Mr. Juden of West Chiltington. He formed the band with Mr. P. Slater, a builder and Mr. Edwin Pullen, a wheelwright, who lent them £20 to buy some instruments. Mr. Pullen went to London, toured the music shops, and returned home with enough instruments for all ten members. Ed Pullen did not actually play an instrument but used to walk in front of the band carrying the flag.

Most of the players had no idea of music when they joined, but by Christmas of 1908 they were proficient enough to give their first performance. They gave a concert of hymns and carols under the leadership of Mr. Juden, who remained their conductor for the next five years. Mr. Nash followed him as conductor and then by Mr. Chatfield, who remained for 20 to 30 years until 1950.

The band started to enter competitions in 1930, and competed in the Brighton Music Festival. On only its second attempt it won a second prize. Many more prizes were to follow in the coming years, hence the name ‘Silver Band’, due to the amount of silverware they won. The band's silver instruments were to come later.

The band owes much to a local family, the Slaters. Phil (Grandfather) Slater and his eldest son Albert were founder members and there were four other Slater brothers who also played. Between them they played cornet, tenor horn, baritone and trombone, and were later joined by other members of their families. Albert took on the role of conductor in 1950 and also taught ex-conductor Doug Golds to play. The last Slater to play in the band was Reg, son of Fred, one of the original brothers. He left in the early nineties.

Doug Golds is now the longest serving member of the band. He joined in 1945 when he was twelve and was given a cornet to practise on, which he had to share with another boy, Jimmy Weeks. They had it for a week each but Doug got so fed up with not being able to practise enough that he asked what else he could play. He was given an old dilapidated tenor horn, much in need of attention, and has been playing the tenor ever since. Doug has had a good spell in front of the band too - stepped into the breach after the sudden retirement of Tony Deacon.

In September 2006 the band recruited Annette Clifford as conductor and musical director.

July 2008 marked the band's centenary.

== Vineyards ==
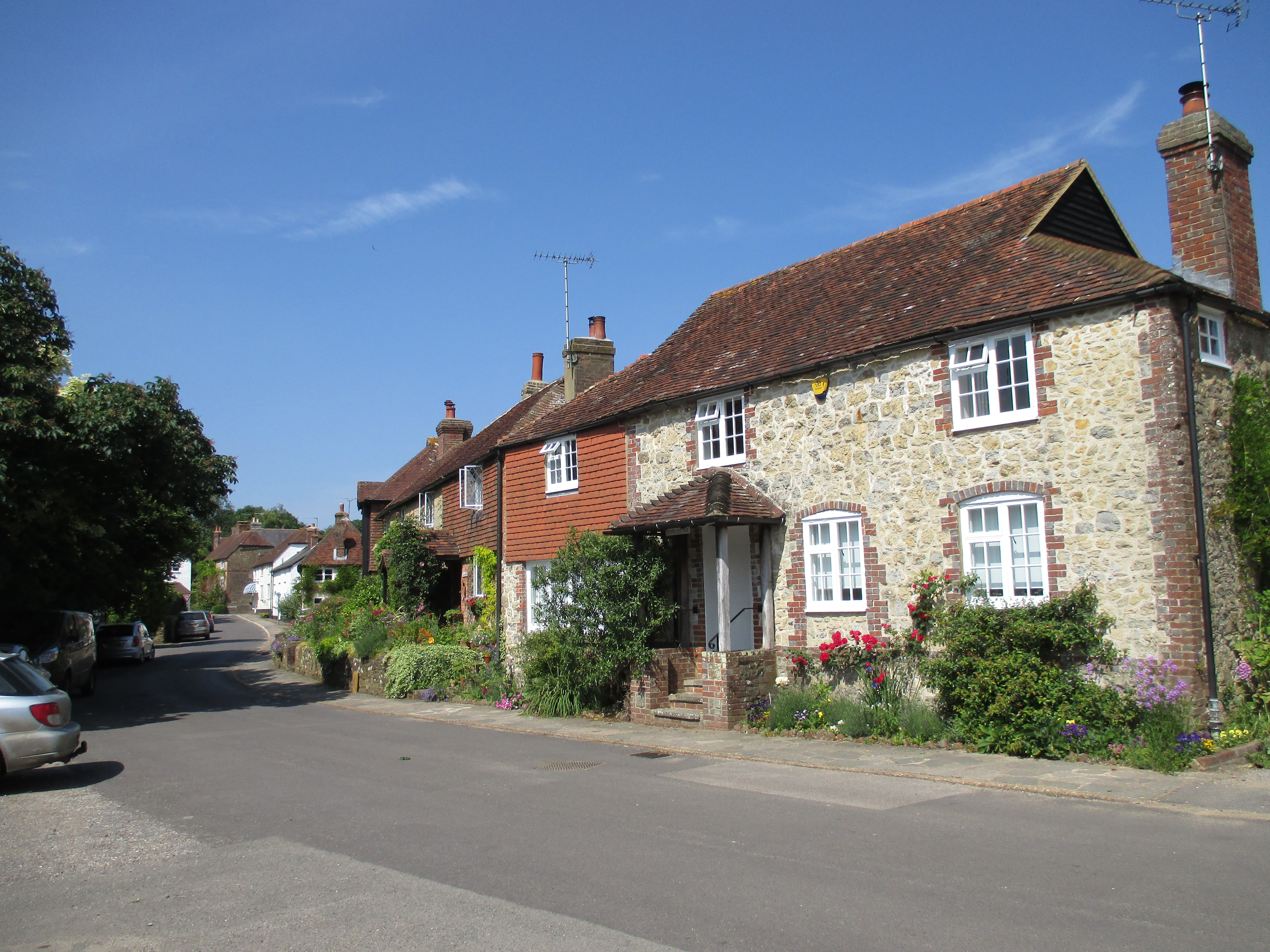
Church Street

West Chiltington is unusual in the South of England in that within its parish boundaries it has three established vineyards. Friar's is tiny and not well known outside the village. Nutbourne is more well known locally and is gradually changing its grape varieties from Germanic types (Sylvaner and Muller-Thurgau) to French ones (Pinot Noir and Chardonnay) but the vineyard of international fame is Nyetimber. Nyetimber is based on an old manor which reputedly was part of the dowry of Anne of Cleves when she married Henry VIII. The first vintage in 1992 was chosen for the Queen's Golden Jubilee dinner. It has recently expanded substantially so that second growths are now in place. The second growth vineyards are located between Petworth and Midhurst. The First Growth 2003 was crowned "Champion of Worldwide Sparkling Wines" (2009) by the Italian wine magazine Euposia using a blind tasting test. The 2003 vintage has won six awards to date including the Euposia award; the latest being a silver medal at the Decanter World Wine Awards 2010.

== Notable people ==
- Alex Adair - DJ, producer and remixer.
- Robin Douglas-Home - Scottish aristocrat, jazz pianist and author.
- Maddie Hinch - Olympic gold medal-winning hockey player.
- H. C. McNeile - author.
- Connor Swindells - actor.

== Hamlets ==
The following additional villages are located in the parish:

- Balls Green
- Broadford Bridge
