= Amherst Tyssen =

Amherst Daniel Tyssen (1843–1930) was an English lawyer and legal author. He is now best known for his writings on Islam.

== Life ==
He was the son of John Robert Daniel-Tyssen FSA (1805–1882) of Brighton, son of William George Daniel-Tyssen whose original surname was Daniel, and his wife Harriet Caroline Hopkinson, daughter of Charles Hopkinson of Cadogan Place. The collector William Tyssen-Amherst, 1st Baron Amherst of Hackney was his first cousin. His father was a solicitor and antiquarian, author of a book on the charters of Carmarthen. He also made a significant collection of historical materials on the borough of Hackney and neighbouring boroughs.

Amherst Tyssen was educated at Winchester College. He matriculated at Merton College, Oxford in 1861, where he was postmaster (senior undergraduate scholar) until 1866, graduating B.A. in 1865. He graduated M.A. and B.C.L. in 1872, and D.C.L. in 1877. He entered the Inner Temple in 1864, and was called to the bar there in 1869. He treated Daniel as a middle name.

Involved in a road accident on 11 January 1930, Tyssen died on 19 January, aged 86.

== Works ==
=== Legal ===
- The Law of Charitable Bequests: With an Account of the Mortmain and Charitable Uses Act, 1888 (1888) A review of the second edition (1921), edited by Claude Eustace Shebbeare and Charles Percy Sanger, called it "a legal classic in its original form".
- The Real Representative Law, 1897: Being Part I. of the Land Transfer Act, 1897, and a Discussion on Administration Thereunder (1898)

Tyssen was a joint editor of the Bar Examination Journal, which was published from 1873 to 1892.

=== Unitarianism ===
- The Annotated Catechism, 1884: being the reformed catechism, 1883, with annotations by the author (1884) In the introduction, Tyssen mentioned assistance given to him by the ministers William Birks, Henry William Crosskey, Thomas Robert Dobson, J. Harrison, Francis Haydn Williams, Herbert Vincent Mills, Halliwell Thomas and Charles Voysey. He further gave a list of a dozen ministers, including Dobson in Brighton, sympathetic to the views expressed in the book.

At that period, Tyssen participated in the British and Foreign Unitarian Association. In the 1890s, he contributed "Notes on Bible Criticism" to The Coming Day, edited by John Page Hopps.

=== Islam ===
An obituary notice in Islamic Review said "We regret to record the death of Dr. Tyssen, who was a regular reader and contributor to the pages of the Islamic Review. He was one of the few Europeans who could understand and appreciate the teachings of the Qurán." On the basis of his long poem The Birth of Islam (1895) and sympathetic views, he has been claimed as a convert; but he remained a member of a Unitarian congregation.

=== Church bells ===
- The Church Bells of Sussex (1864)

Church bells were one of the antiquarian interests of his father. Tyssen also wrote a history of the Whitechapel Bell Foundry, published as papers read to the London and Middlesex Archaeological Society.

== Family ==
Tyssen married in 1883 Cassandra Mary Amelia Madden, 5th daughter of Charles Madden of the Indian Service and his wife Julia Charlotte Loveday, daughter of Lieut-Gen. Lambert Richard Loveday of the Bengal Army. Philip Wicksteed officiated at the service, in Little Portland Street Unitarian Street, London. The couple had a daughter and two sons.
