= Nutbourne, Horsham =

Hamlet in West Sussex, England

Coordinates: 50.9589°N 0.47117°W

Nutbourne
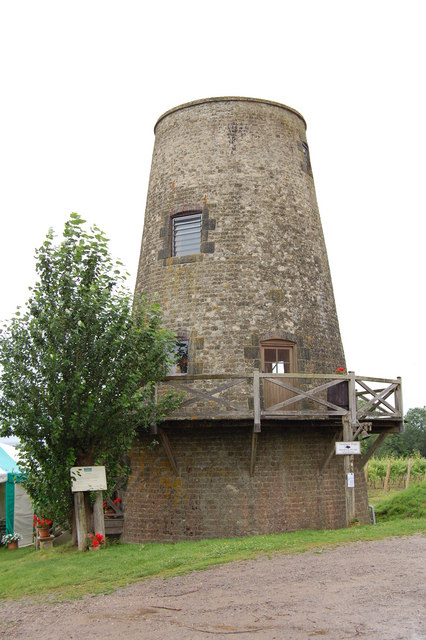
- Nutbourne Windmill

- Location within West Sussex
- OS grid reference: TQ074188
- Civil parish: Pulborough
- District: Horsham
- Shire county: West Sussex
- Region: South East
- Country: England
- Sovereign state: United Kingdom
- Post town: Pulborough
- Postcode district: RH20 2
- Police: Sussex
- Fire: West Sussex
- Ambulance: South East Coast
- UK Parliament: Arundel and South Downs

Nutbourne is a hamlet running north–south situated 1.5 miles (2.4 km) east of Pulborough in the Horsham District of West Sussex and is in Pulborough civil parish. It is in the civil parish of West Chiltington.

The topographical features of the locality consist of gently sloping terrain of the Hythe Beds with a southerly aspect and a soil of loam on greensand readily suitable for cultivation. This together with a constant supply of water lead to the establishment of a farming settlement, probably by the Saxons, which was called knutu burna, meaning a stream with nut trees. At the time of the Domesday Survey the Manor of Nordborne was rated at six hides and contained two mills. During succeeding centuries it developed only very gradually.

Today it remains a small farming village. It has lost most of its soft fruit growing but has a thriving vineyard with public wine tasting in an old windmill from May to September. There is one public house, the Rising Sun. The shops have gone but a garage remains doing mechanical and bodywork repairs. Behind and within the walls of houses small businesses operate doing various kinds of work.

The village street rises northwards, and is developed on both sides with stone buildings and walls built up to the road frontage on the western side and grassed banks and hedges on the eastern. The stone walls lining the street and houses are listed of townscape value.

Represented in the village are various periods and styles of architecture, ranging from timber-framed cottages to modern red brick houses, all of a simple domestic scale with a variety of design, detailing, texture and irregular positioning and spacing along the road frontage giving the village its basic physical character. Stone is the predominant building material being used extensively for boundary walls as well as buildings. The rural nature of The Street results from the presence of grassed verges and banks instead of separate pavements for pedestrians, together with the abundance of planting along the frontages of properties. This character has been lost in places by the formation of lay-bys to serve new development.

At its northern end The Street divides into two, with the highway bending west and then northwards through a cutting towards Gay Street and North Heath, whilst the other part bends east past the former school to become a non-metalled bridle road. This narrow track becomes a dark, damp passage being bordered by banks and overhung by trees, but in a short distance it suddenly emerges into a small valley containing a mill pond surrounded by high wire fencing. There are stone former mill buildings to the south followed by a series of ponds. In the east there is a vineyard and to the north the valley is contained by a steep tree covered slopes with more ponds created by dams across a small brook. To the west are more gentle slopes with field boundaries defined by trees and bushes. The views outwards are restricted by the topography and as a result this valley is a distinctive environmental area, virtually isolated from the village, but retaining clear evidence of its historical associations with the settlement.

== Governance ==
On a local level, Nutbourne is governed by Pulborough Parish Council.

The next level of government is Horsham District Council in parallel with West Sussex County Council, which has responsibility for Education, Libraries, Social Services, Civil Registration, Trading Standards and Transport. Elections for the District and County Council are held every four years.

The UK Parliament constituency for Nutbourne is Arundel and South Downs.
