= Attirampakkam =

Paleolithic site in Tamil Nadu, India

Coordinates: 13°13′50″N 79°53′20″E

Attirampakkam's location in India.

Attirampakkam, or Athirampakkam is a village near river Kortallaiyar located 60 kilometers away from Chennai, Tamil Nadu, India. The oldest stone tools in India were discovered near the village, which became the type site for the Madrasian culture.

== Discovery ==
Robert Bruce Foote and his colleague William King of the East India Company's Geological Survey found the first primitive stone tools at Attirampakkam in early 1863. Later, more stone tools were recovered from Attirampakkam over 20 years by archaeologists from the Sharma Centre for Heritage Education in India and other Indian institutions.

== Dating of artifacts ==
With the assistance of French scientists, the age of the objects found in the trenches was determined using cosmic ray exposure dating (26Al/10Be). It was the first time an archaeological site in India was dated by this method. By performing a luminescence dating method called Post Infrared Stimulated Luminescence (pIR-IRSL) on about 7,200 artifacts found at Attirampakkam, researchers have made a chronology of Attirampakkam stone tool technology with a span of about 200,000 years. Latest studies indicate that the Levallois technology used at Attirampakkam emerged about 385,000 (± 64,000) years ago, at a period when processes signifying the end of the Acheulian culture occurred and a Middle Palaeolithic culture had emerged.

== Key Findings ==
- Creation of a lengthy stratigraphic sequence with layered occupancy levels between the Middle Palaeolithic and Acheulian periods.
- The finding of a previously unknown new Acheulian horizon deep within buried deposits.
- An estimated 1 to 1.7 Ma (million years ago) marked the establishment of the oldest Acheulian in India, which may have significant effects on the distribution of Homo erectus s.l. Throughout Asia.
- Comprehensive analyses of the typology, technology, and manufacturing sequences of stone artifacts from the Acheulian to the Middle Palaeolithic provide fresh insights into hominins' behavior.
- Experimental reconstruction of the steps and applications in the manufacture of tools and new projects involving microwear on tool edges.
- Investigations of sediments that provided fresh insights into palaeomonsoons in this area during the Acheulian and Middle Palaeolithic eras of occupancy.
- Using pollen proxies and phytoliths, the site's historical vegetation is examined.

== See also ==
- Acheulean industry
- Madrasian culture
- Jwalapuram
- South Asian Stone Age
