= Robert Bruce Foote =

British geologist and archaeologist

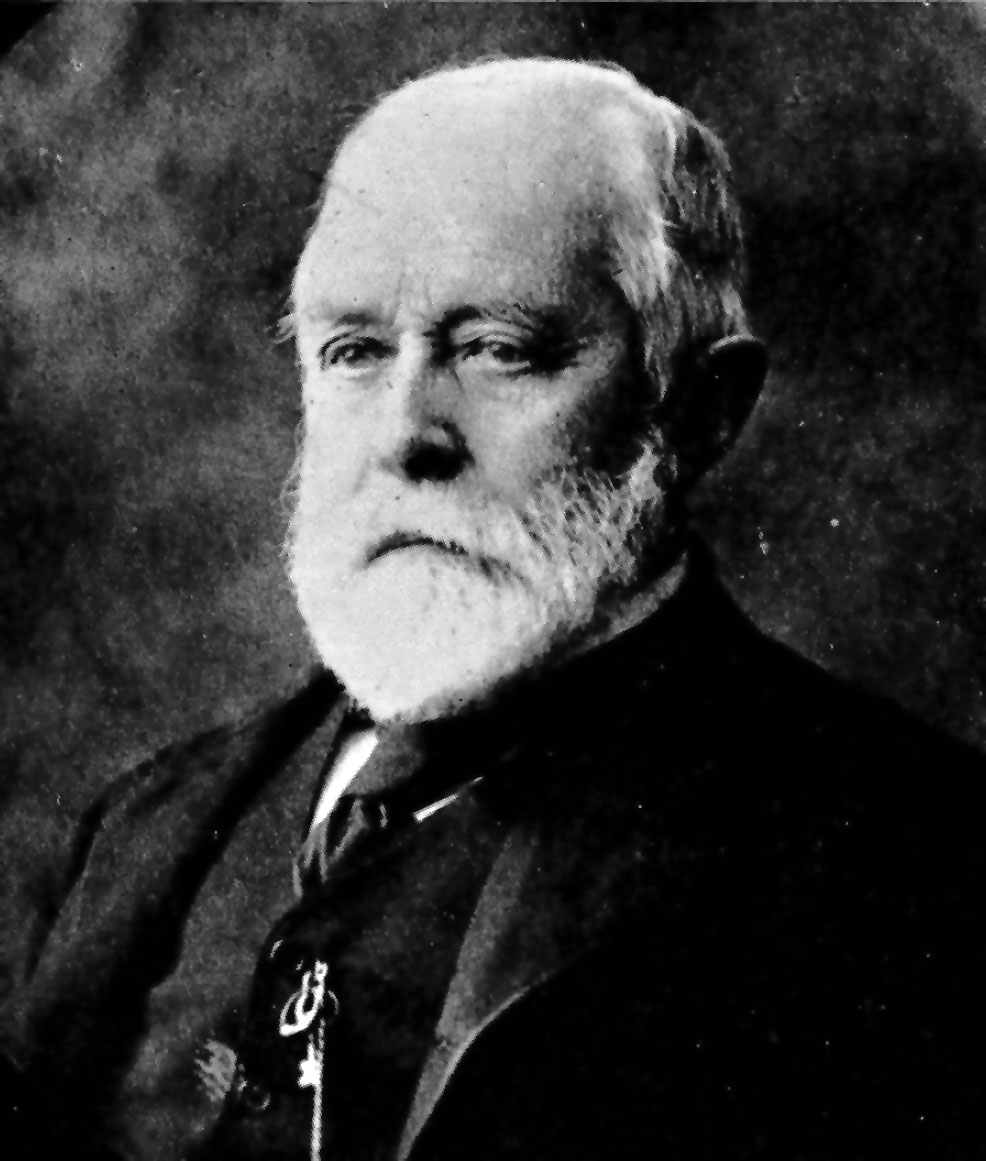
- Born: 22 September 1834; Cheltenham, United Kingdom
- Died: 29 December 1912 (aged 78); Calcutta, Bengal Presidency, British India (now Kolkata, West Bengal, India)
- Resting place: Ashes- Holy Trinity Church, Yercaud, Salem district, Tamil Nadu, India
- Known for: Geology and archaeology of India

Robert Bruce Foote (22 September 1834 – 29 December 1912) was a British geologist and archaeologist who conducted geological surveys of prehistoric locations in India for the Geological Survey of India. For his contributions to Indian archaeology, he is called the father of Indian prehistory. He discovered the site of Attirampakkam (then part of the Madras Presidency, near Chennai), a Madrasian culture.

== Work ==
Foote joined the Geological Survey of India (GSI) on 29 December 1858 and was posted in the Madras Presidency, Hyderabad State and Bombay Presidency. An interest in Paleolithic life was inspired by the work of Joseph Prestwich in 1859. In 1863, after his archaeological survey began, he discovered India's first conclusive Paleolithic stone tool (a hand axe). He found the tool in southern India (Pallavaram, near Madras). After the discovery, he and William King went on to discover more such tools and settlements in Southern and Western India. In 1884, he discovered the 3.5 kilometres (2.2 mi) long Belum Caves, the second largest cave in the Indian subcontinent. In 1887, he became a Director of the GSI, and retiring in 1891, he joined the state of Baroda.

As a geologist, one of his significant contributions to Indian geology was the "Geological Features of the South Mahratta Country and Adjacent Districts" (i.e., Border districts of Maharashtra, Karnataka and Andhra Pradesh States in India).

Foote built a valuable collection due to 40 years of geological and pre-historic expeditions in various parts of western and southern India. Foote's collection of antiquities was all sold to the Madras Government Museum in 1906, where it is quoted to be a valuable treasure.

== Later life ==
Later, he settled in Yercaud, where his father-in-law Reverend Peter Percival had worked and lived.

== Death ==
He died on 29 December 1912 and was cremated at Calcutta; his ashes were deposited at Holy Trinity Church, Yercaud, Tamil Nadu, India. There is a memorial to him there. Foote was a Fellow of the Geological Society, London, from 1867 and a Fellow of the Royal Anthropological Institute.

== Family ==
His grandson was Major General Henry Bowreman Foote, who was the recipient of the Victoria Cross for his contributions to realm's defence during the Second World War.

== See also ==
- Madrasian culture
