= North Heath =

Hamlet in West Sussex, England

Coordinates: 50.98129°N 0.47884°W

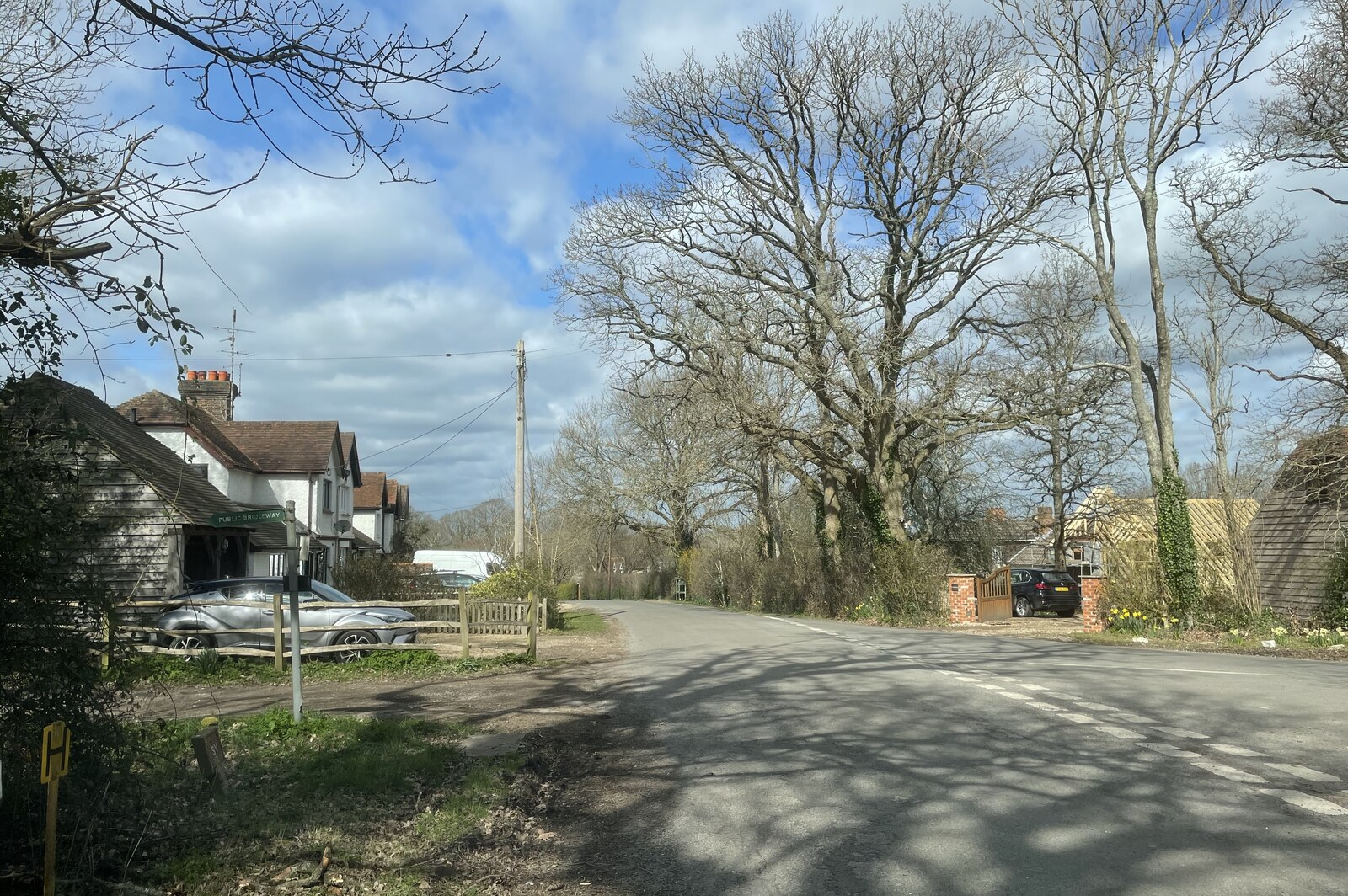
- Entering North Heath

- Location within West Sussex
- OS grid reference: TQ068213
- Civil parish: Pulborough
- District: Horsham
- Shire county: West Sussex
- Region: South East
- Country: England
- Sovereign state: United Kingdom
- Police: Sussex
- Fire: West Sussex
- Ambulance: South East Coast
- UK Parliament: Arundel and South Downs

North Heath is a hamlet in the Horsham District of West Sussex, England. It lies just off the A29 road 1.9 miles (3 km) north of Pulborough.

The Brinsbury Campus of Chichester College occupies 250 hectares with a working farm and horticultural and equestrian teaching facilities.

== Climate ==
Climate data for North Heath (1991–2020)
Month	Jan	Feb	Mar	Apr	May	Jun	Jul	Aug	Sep	Oct	Nov	Dec	Year
Mean daily maximum °C (°F)	8.6 (47.5)	9.0 (48.2)	11.7 (53.1)	14.8 (58.6)	17.6 (63.7)	20.7 (69.3)	23.3 (73.9)	23.0 (73.4)	19.9 (67.8)	15.9 (60.6)	11.9 (53.4)	9.2 (48.6)	15.5 (59.9)
Mean daily minimum °C (°F)	2.5 (36.5)	2.2 (36.0)	3.4 (38.1)	4.6 (40.3)	7.0 (44.6)	9.7 (49.5)	11.8 (53.2)	11.6 (52.9)	9.5 (49.1)	7.1 (44.8)	4.4 (39.9)	2.6 (36.7)	6.4 (43.5)
Average precipitation mm (inches)	92.3 (3.63)	63.5 (2.50)	52.6 (2.07)	52.6 (2.07)	46.9 (1.85)	55.9 (2.20)	63.3 (2.49)	63.6 (2.50)	63.4 (2.50)	103.3 (4.07)	103.1 (4.06)	98.2 (3.87)	858.7 (33.81)
Mean monthly sunshine hours	55.3	83.0	117.9	170.2	205.1	199.6	215.9	196.6	148.2	109.3	66.2	54.1	1,621.3
Source: Met Office
