= John Page Hopps =

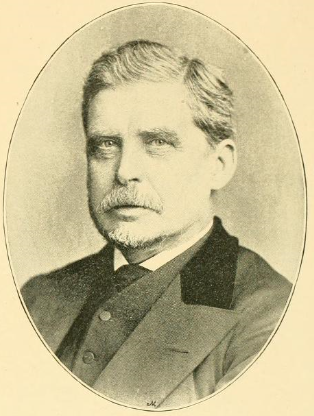
- Born: 6 November 1834
- Died: 6 April 1911 (aged 76)
- Occupation(s): Unitarian minister, spiritualist

John Page Hopps (6 November 1834 – 6 April 1911) was a Unitarian minister and spiritualist.

Hopps was born in London. He was educated at the General Baptist College, Leicester. He worked as George Dawson's assistant at the Church of the Saviour, Birmingham and from 1860 to 1876 he ministered to Unitarians. He was a minister at the Unitarian Church in Bath Street, Glasgow. Hopps was a convinced spiritualist and was influenced by William Howitt and C. F. Varley. He had unified his unitarianism with spiritualism by arguing the bible was a record of spirit communication.

In a lecture for the London Spiritualist Alliance, Hopps supported biological evolution and spiritualism.

He created and edited the monthly periodical The Truthseeker (1863-1887). Hopps also edited a spiritualist newspaper Daybreak, which was absorbed into the weekly spiritualist newspaper The Medium and Daybreak of James Burns. In 1886 his "Letter to a Radical Member of Parliament" advocating women's suffrage was published in the Manchester-based Women's Suffrage Journal. In it he wrote, "I do not believe that women would hinder progress. I think that as [to] questions relating to peace and war, social purity, and the doing of equal justice to all, they would help us on. But if the reverse were the case, what right have we to deny them the suffrage for that reason? Who is the infallible judge as to what 'progress' is, and who gave that judge the right to have his way?"

== Publications ==
- The Future Life (1884)
- Pilgrim Songs With Other poems Written During Forty Years (1891)
- Who Was Jehovah? (1891)
- Death a Delusion (1895)
