= Chichester to Silchester Way =

Roman road in England

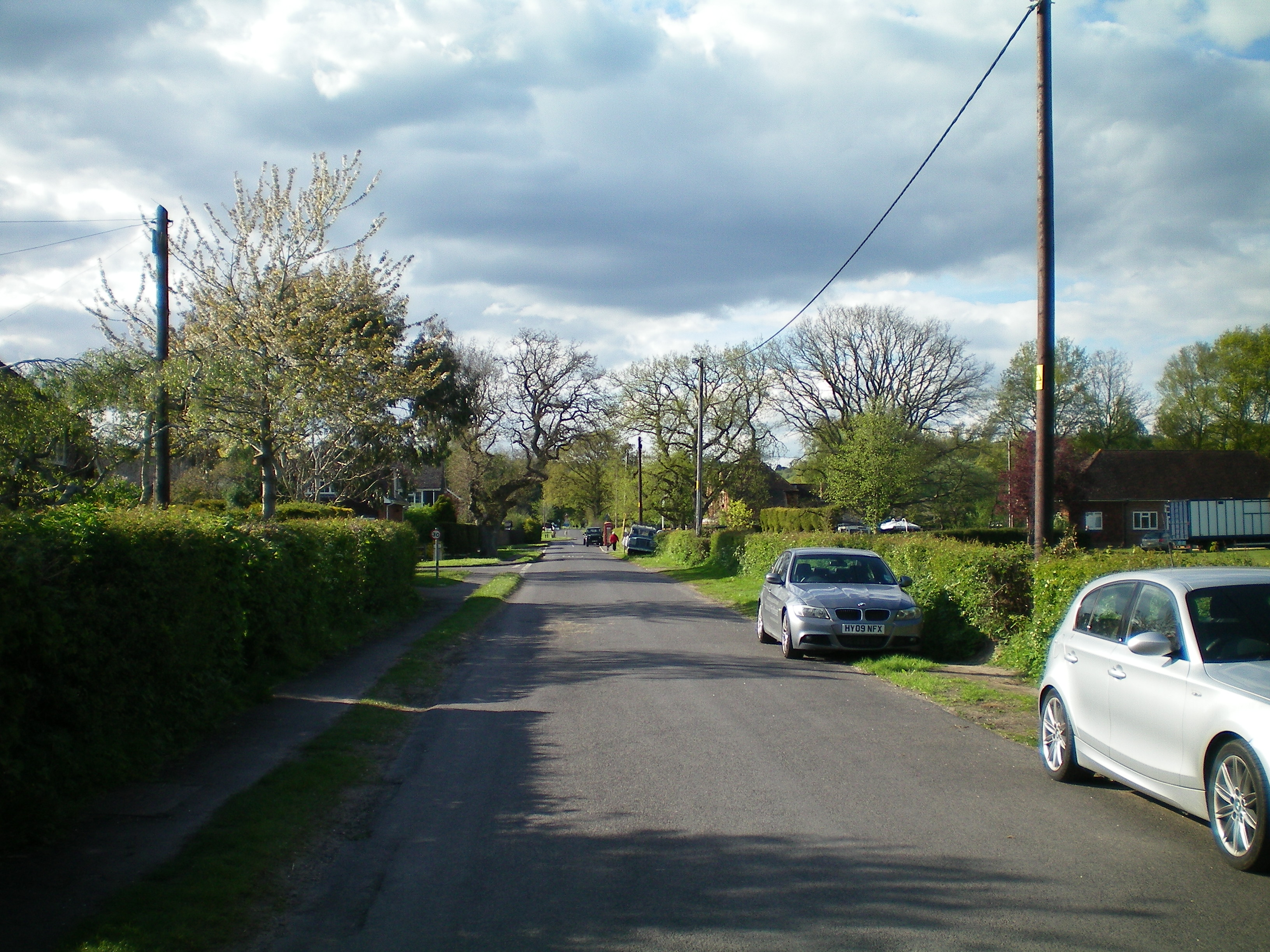
Still in use; the road at Milland

The Chichester to Silchester Way is a Roman Road between Chichester in South-East England, which as Noviomagus was capital of the Regni, and Silchester or Calleva Atrebatum, capital of the Atrebates. The road had been entirely lost and forgotten, leaving no Saxon place names as clues to its existence, until its chance discovery through aerial photography in 1949. Only 6 kilometres (3.7 mi) of the 62 kilometres (39 mi) long road remain in use.

== Discovery ==
The existence of this road was unknown until 1949 when the archaeological division of the Ordnance Survey, while examining aerial photographs of the Milland area, noticed earthworks the size and shape of a Roman mansio, similar to those on Stane Street at Hardham and Alfoldean. Because the mansio stood on the shortest of the road's alignments this gave few clues to the overall route, and much further investigation of aerial photographs and remains on the ground was needed to establish the whole route.

== Dating evidence ==
The road must be later than the Winchester to Silchester road, which it joins.

== Design and construction ==
A single alignment between the two cities would have taken the road across many feeder streams of the River Rother, crossing the river itself twice. A more easterly route was therefore taken using four alignments of straight sections of route, which crossed the Rother once at Iping and joined the Winchester to Silchester road about one mile south of Silchester, avoiding two stream crossings close to that city.

The road was wider than average for Britain and well constructed, with a layer of flint or gravel on a cambered agger. A section excavated at Milland had a 2 to 3-inch layer of gravel on a substantial cambered foundation.

== Margary number ==
Ivan Margary gave the road the Margary number 155 in his identification system for Roman roads in Britain.

== The route ==
=== Chichester to West Lavant ===
Whether by chance or not the road starts from Chichester's north gate (50.840°N 0.779°W) on an alignment aimed directly at Silchester. It is not known if this was planned or if it followed an existing Iron Age track to Bow Hill that happened to go in that direction.

=== West Lavant to Dunner Hill ===
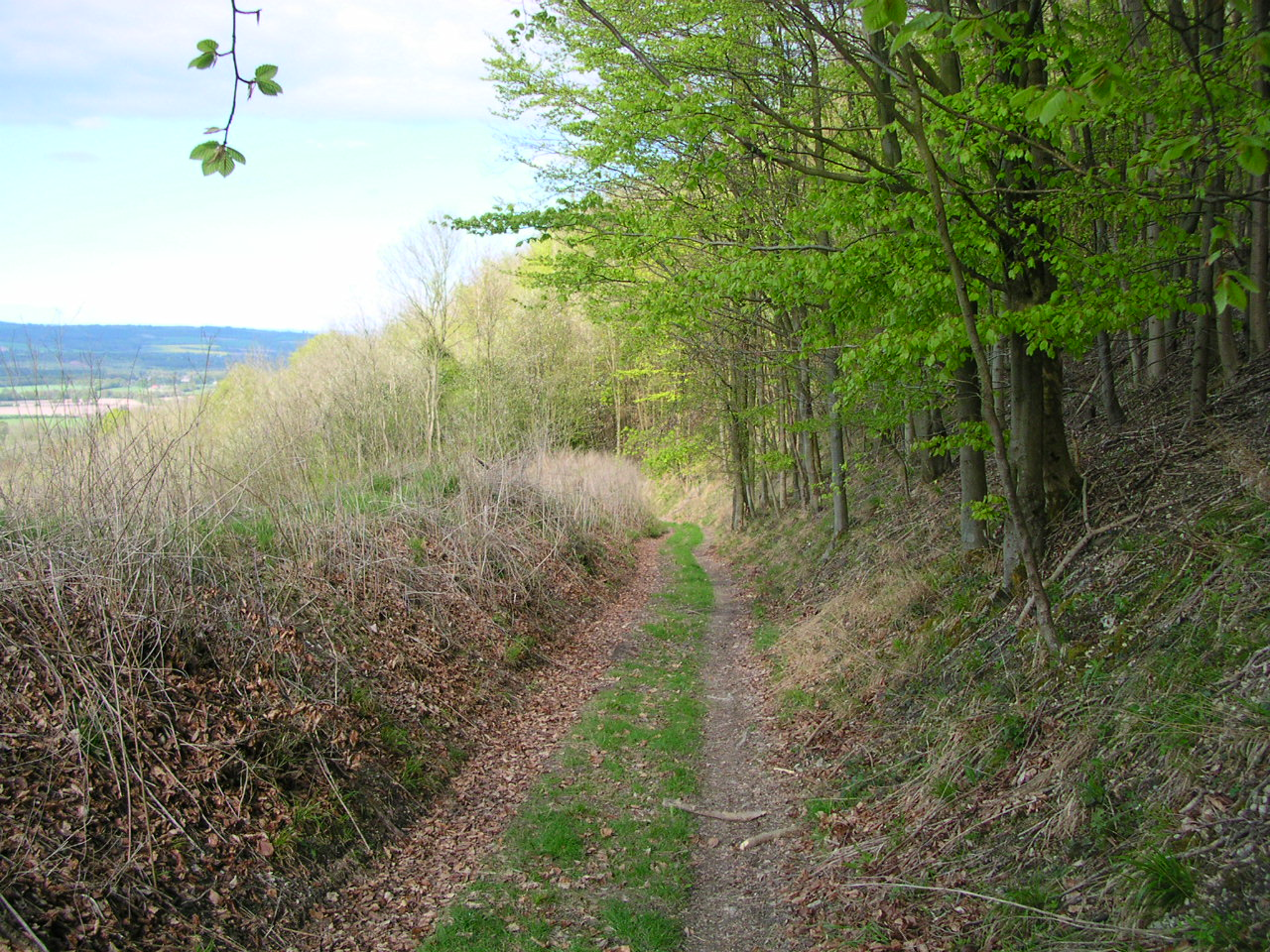
Eroded terraceway near the top of Linch Down

At East Broyle Copse the road turns north on an alignment to Dunner Hill. It runs on or close to Brandy Hole Lane and passes on the west side of Lavant House School, from where Two Barns Lane runs upon it for about half a mile. Running up to Heathbarn Down, Margary found hedgerows on the line north of Binderton House and north from Henbush Copse. On the down the agger could be seen both on aerial photographs and on the ground, with outer ditches 60 feet apart. Undetectable past Hylters Farm, a slight agger is visible on Stapleash Down, then as a terraceway descending the down, the line passes east of Staple Ash Farm, then enters a wood called "The Ditches" where it can be traced as an agger then a terrace, then an agger again, as much as 30 feet wide with a lot of flint. In Linchball Wood the road curves a little to the east on a slight agger, just inside the western boundary of the wood, followed by a parish boundary, reaching its highest point at 217 metres (712 ft). Here there are commanding views north across the Western Weald and south to Chichester and the coast.

After crossing the ridgeway track, now the South Downs Way the road descends the scarp slope of the Linch Down in a northeasterly direction as an eroded terraceway, and lower down turns northward as a deep hollow way, as it descends to Linch Farm, where there is an old chapel site. This line makes use of a northward spur of chalk. From here the road is followed by the farm track for some 500m before disappearing into the cultivated fields. The road can be found again along the west edge of Haccott's Copse, from where it passes east of Fitzhall to Fitzhall Heath where it passes between tumuli as a prominent agger. The road continues across Iping Common as an agger with ditches 60 feet apart, then a hollow, to cross the A272 road before running as a slight terrace along the west edge of Crowshole Copse to the River Rother. North of the river the road line crosses open fields before being followed by a hedge north of Hammer Lane; then an agger is visible in Captain's Wood before Iping Lane briefly follows it at Stubbhill Farm. The road then follows a terraceway up Dunner Hill, then descending by a zig-zag.

=== Dunner Hill to Weavers Down ===
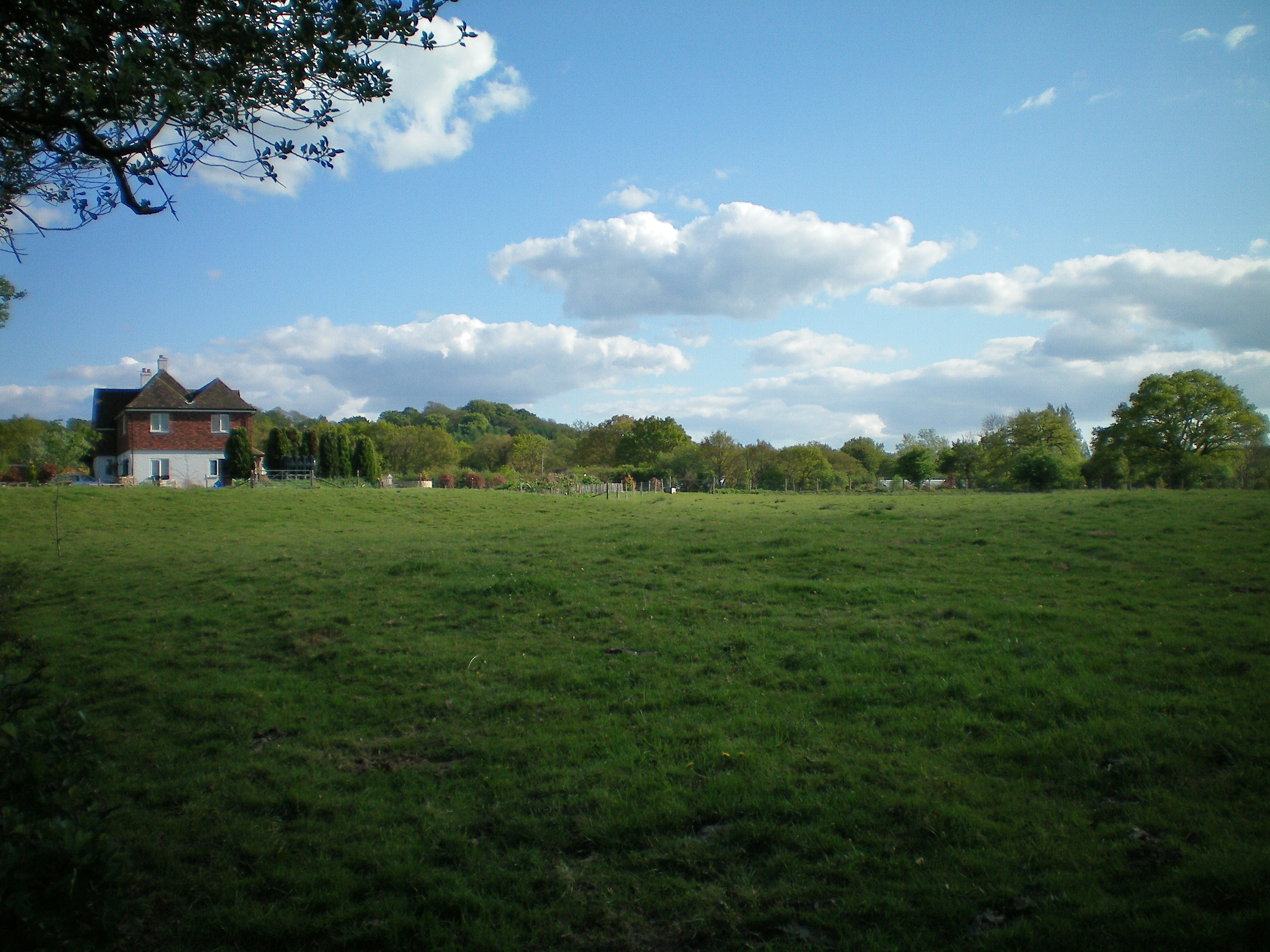
A house standing within the mansio boundary banks

After zig-zagging down Dunner Hill the next alignment to Weavers Down begins. Traces of agger across Iping Marsh lead to the mansio site at Weston's Farm. This was slightly smaller than the sites on Stane Street at Hardham and Alfoldean. The road is then in modern use through Milland to at least the northern end of the straight section, from where the line is uncertain until it can be found as a cutting, then a substantial causeway, at Chapel Common. Passing southwest of Hutfield Copse, the road crosses the Sussex Border Path and soon enters the army training area at Weavers Down, with traces of an agger with side ditches running up to the crest of the hill, which is crossed on an eroded terrace.

=== Weavers Hill to Silchester ===
The road forms the central track of Longmoor Military Camp, then north of the A3 road passes west of Woolmer Pond near Greatham, with an alignment change as it crosses the A325 road. It then passes through the western edge of Blackmoor and continues northwest through Binswood to cross the B 3004 road east of East Worldham, then crosses Wyck Lane not far from the site of a Roman building near Wyck Place. The road passes through Upton Grey, east of Old Basing, then through Bramley, before joining the Winchester to Silchester (51.354°N 1.1°W) road.

In East Hampshire the road passed through a Roman wine-growing area, and was close to Alice Holt Forest, where pottery was produced on an industrial scale in Roman times. Alice Holt pottery has been found along the Sussex and Hampshire coast.

== See also ==
- Roman Britain
- Roman roads in Britain
- Chichester to Sidlesham Way
