= London to Brighton Way =

Roman road in southern England

Coordinates: 51.14624°N 0.04721°W

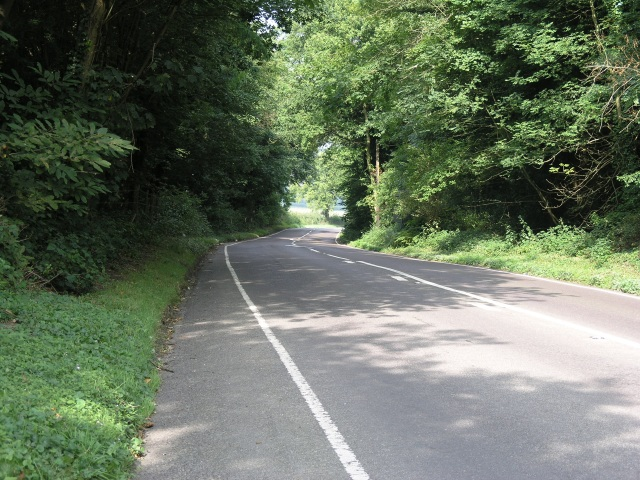
The road south of Godstone at Tilburstow Hill

The London to Brighton Way, also called the London to Portslade Way, is a Roman road between Stane Street at Kennington Park and Brighton (or more specifically Portslade) in Sussex. The road passes through Streatham and Croydon, then through the Caterham Valley gap in the North Downs. It passes through Godstone and Felbridge, then follows an almost straight line through Ardingly, Haywards Heath, Burgess Hill and Hassocks to the South Downs at Clayton. At Hassocks it crosses the Sussex Greensand Way at a large Roman cemetery. It climbs the South Downs escarpment, crossing the ridgeway and connecting with other local tracks. South of Pyecombe the route is uncertain, and may have continued to Brighton or to Portslade.

The road passed through some of the strategically important iron-producing areas of the Weald and was partly constructed from iron slag in those areas, although to a lesser extent than the London to Lewes Way.

== Discovery of the road ==
A number of Anglo-Saxon place names are clues to the road's existence; Streatham in London, and near Godstone, Stanstreet (now renamed Stanstead) and Stratton are indicative of a paved road already in existence when the settlements were founded. There was some traditional memory of a Roman road at Caterham, Croydon and Ardingly. In 1779 a schoolmaster from Lindfield, Stephen Vine, witnessed flint being taken from an ancient road to build a turnpike road. He published a report on the line from Clayton to north of Burgess Hill in The Gentleman's Magazine in 1781. In 1818 Reverend James Douglas looked at these findings and surmised that this was part of a road to a port in the Portslade area. This led to the surmised route being named the London to Portslade Way. Ivan Margary believed Brighton Old Steine, allowing for coastal erosion since Roman times, to have been more suitable as the destination port and called it the London to Brighton Way. Work in the mid 20th century established the route from London to Hassocks, but south of this there was still uncertainty. A paper published in 1999 by Glen Shields on the topography of the Hassocks and Clayton area concludes that the road took a more westerly route over Clayton Hill than proposed by Margary, and that a traceable route to Portslade would have been more practical and more in keeping with Roman practice elsewhere than going along the valley bottom to Brighton.

== Design and construction ==
Margary concluded that four main alignments were used for the road as far as the South Downs, with local diversions from them to ease gradients and avoid wet ground. From London these were (1) Streatham to Croydon, (2) Godstone Hill to Blindley Heath, (3) Rowlands Farm, Lingfield, to Hophurst Farm, Felbridge, (4) Selsfield Common to Clayton Hill. Flint and gravel were used through the North Downs and from Burgess Hill to the South Downs, with slag from the Wealden iron industry used extensively for the middle sections, sometimes mixed with sandstone and sometimes as a solid mass. In other parts of the Weald local sandstone alone was used.

== Margary number ==
Ivan Margary gave the road the Margary number 150 in his identification system.

== Route ==
=== Kennington to Croydon ===
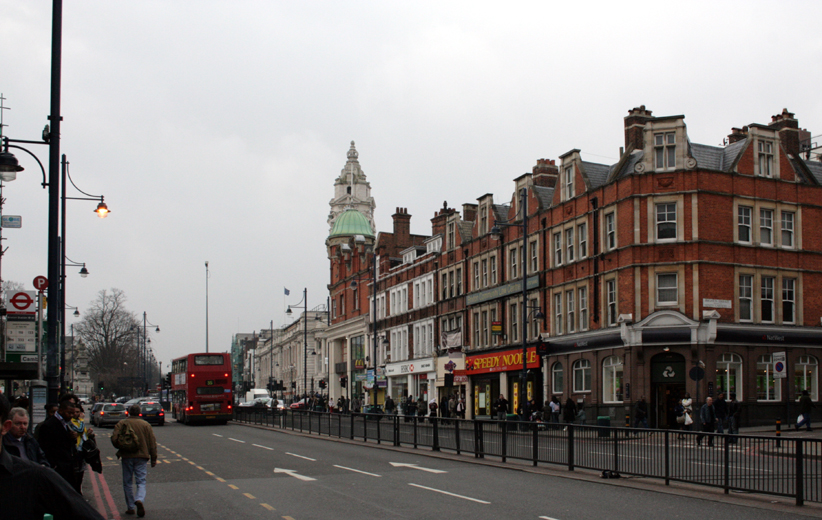
Brixton Road, London, lies on the Roman road

The road branched from Stane Street at or near Kennington Park and has become the line of the modern A23 road for several miles through south London, followed by Brixton Road, Brixton Hill, Streatham Hill, Streatham High Road and London Road, Streatham, then the A235 road on London Road nearer to Croydon. Streatham takes its name from the Roman road and Brixton Hill was formerly named Brixton Causeway, causeway being a term often used for old Roman roads. At Hepworth Road at Norbury, where the modern road wanders from the Roman line, the intact road, 32 feet wide, was excavated in 1961 and remnants of a metalled ford across the stream were found further south at Hermitage Bridge on the River Graveney.

=== Croydon ===
The line of the road through what is now the heavily built-up town of Croydon is debated. There are two main possibilities: that it followed the line of the modern (late-medieval/post-medieval) high road (London Road – North End – High Street – South End – Brighton Road); or that it followed a more westerly course through Old Town.

Margary argued for the Old Town route, stating that south of Thornton Heath, at Broad Green Avenue, a slight alignment change took the Roman road west of London Road along Handcroft Road, part of Gardeners Road and Pitlake. Before the area was built over Owen Manning and William Bray noted this route in their History and Antiquities of the County of Surrey (1814), saying that the line "took its course by Old Croydon and the West side of Broad Green where it is still visible". Further support to the theory is given by a title deed of the late 1280s, by which a piece of property, described as lying on the east side of the king's highway in Old Town, was sold by one "Andrew de Calceto in Croyndon", also named as "Andrew ate Causie", both forms of his name meaning "of/at the causeway", a term which implies a well constructed road. The modern A236 dual carriageway, which bypasses Croydon to the west, is named Roman Way in acknowledgement of this theory. A little further south, the road may have followed the line of Duppas Hill Terrace and Violet Lane.

Against the Old Town theory is the fact that the area (lying in the headwaters of the River Wandle) would have been extremely marshy, and that it might have been more logical for the Roman engineers to have followed the higher and dryer ground, and straighter alignment, of the easterly High Street route. This route would also have avoided a steep climb up to Riddlesdown. There has been considerably more archaeological evidence for Roman activity around the line of the High Street route than around that of the Old Town route, but no clear evidence for the road. The High Street theory grew in popularity among archaeologists in the late twentieth century, but has more recently been rejected by Matt Sparkes.

A compromise argument would see the road following the Old Town route as far as Duppas Hill, but then cutting across the Wandle valley to Riddlesdown.

=== Croydon to Godstone ===
South of Croydon the road passed through the Caterham Gap in the North Downs; this natural corridor has been heavily developed with modern roads and railways, along with suburban housing, obliterating much of the ancient road. The road can, however, be found east of Caterham where the road curves around the west side of Tillingdown on a terraceway, marking the boundary between developed and undeveloped land. A distinct metalled agger was found at the northern end, while on the terrace it was 25 ft wide and well metalled with flint to a maximum depth of 12 in. As is often the case with Roman roads a parish boundary follows the line. The Roman line joins the lower part of Tillingdown Lane, then the B2030 road and A22 Caterham Bypass before becoming a lane east of the A22 as it approaches the M25 motorway where the intersection is on the Roman line.

=== Godstone to Felbridge ===
South of junction 6 of the M25 motorway the Roman road has remained in use as the B2235 through Godstone and then as Tilburstow Hill road, in a series of straight alignments adapted to the terrain. Roman burial urns were found beside the road at Tilburstow Hill Common. Between Tilburstow Hill and Blindley Heath Margary noted large hedgebanks set back on either side of the modern lane, indicating the overall width of the road, adapted as a medieval droveway. North of Blindley Heath the A22 road rejoins the Roman line through the village before the Roman road turns south east through Shawland's Wood, then across open fields to cross the B2028 road, south of which it is seen as a hedgeline and is a parish boundary. This modified alignment then crosses the Eden Brook and turns south-west onto the modified north section of a long and largely straight alignment to Clayton. This eastward shift of the alignment avoided wet low-lying ground.

=== Felbridge to Clayton ===
This longest alignment, at 28 kilometres (17 mi), follows a mostly straight course across the Weald, with minor diversions to avoid steep or wet ground. It was sighted between Selsfield Common and Clayton Hill. The line north of this to Green Wood was adjusted 11 degrees to the east to avoid wet ground. This alignment change occurs on the ridge near Hophurst Farm, on an ancient east–west track along the sandstone ridge. 0.5 kilometres (0.31 mi) south of this the road crosses the Worth Way, then crosses the Sussex Border Path at Burleigh House Farm. It crosses the B2110 road east of Turners Hill and goes over the high ground at Selsfield Common before crossing the B2028 road, then running parallel and to the west of it to Ardingly. The road passes through the grounds of Wakehurst Place and the agricultural showground before deviating to the west of the alignment to cross the valley where it is now under Ardingly Reservoir, regaining the line where it crosses a dismantled railway at River's Wood.

It goes through the western edge of Haywards Heath and was found by Margary near Harlands Farm. Geophysical survey and trenching in 1998–9 to the SW of the town found evidence of a sandstone metalled road on a line consistent with Margary's proposed alignment of the Roman road, about 50m west of the route marked by the Ordnance Survey. Going through central Burgess Hill it passes the west side of the parish church, where its course is marked by brass plaques set into the modern road surface. Freek's Lane north of the town follows the Roman road for a distance south of Lowlands Farm and again briefly north of it.

Between Burgess Hill and Hassocks very little has been found. This is the section that Vine observed being stripped of its stone in 1779 to build a turnpike road. At the crossroads with the Sussex Greensand Way at Hassocks there is a large Roman cemetery in the south west corner.

=== Clayton to the coast ===
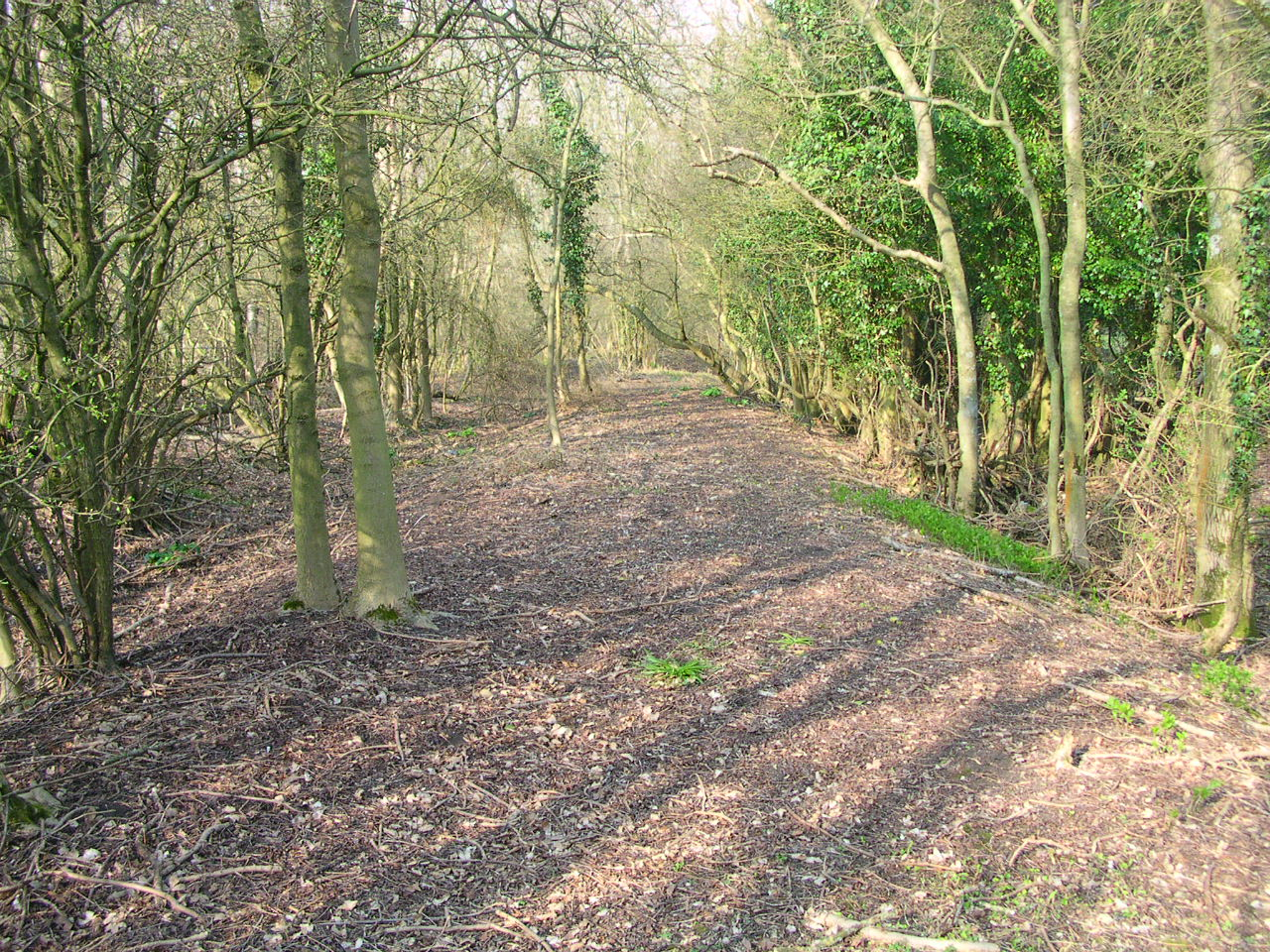
Part of the Nore Track on Wolstonbury Hill above Clayton

Various sections of apparently Roman road found around Hassocks have caused long-standing confusion about the course of the road over the South Downs escarpment. Building and upgrading of turnpike roads over Clayton Hill in the 18th and 19th centuries have left abandoned roads which have been mistaken for Roman work, and disturbance from the building of the railway cutting and the tunnel with its many air shafts have further confused the issue. More recent research by Glen Shields suggests that the road followed a more westerly route, now known as the Nore Track, which uses another pass on the west side of a small hill called the Nore. This track, now a bridleway, reaches the summit at 155 metres (509 ft), then gently descends to Pyecombe as a broad and well-constructed terraceway along the west side of Wish Bottom. North of the village it is joined by the disused turnpike road which has crossed the valley from Clayton Hill; it then continues as the village street.

The route from Pyecombe to the coast is not known. Margary concluded, without any evidence, that Brighton Old Steine might have been a better place for a port than Portslade, and that therefore the road would have gone down the valley to Brighton. This would have followed a valley bottom prone to seasonal flooding, which the Romans normally avoided, preferring to use higher ground. Steep side valleys, locally called coombes, would have prevented building along the valley sides. Alternatively the route may have turned south west on the track which is now the South Downs Way, heading towards the River Adur in the Portslade area.

== See also ==
- Roman Britain
- Roman roads in Britain

== Bibliography ==
- Maggs, Ken; De'Athe, Paul (1987). The Roman Roads of East Surrey and the Kent Border. Westerham: North Downs Press.
- Margary, Ivan D. (1968). Roman Ways in the Weald. Phoenix House. ISBN 0-460-07742-2.
- Shields, Glen (1999). "The course of the London to Brighton Roman road south of Burgess Hill" (PDF). Sussex Archaeological Collections. 137: 81–90. doi:10.5284/1085954.
- Sparkes, Matt (2024). "Roman Croydon: the course of the road and the location of the settlement". Surrey Archaeological Collections. 106: 195–216. doi:10.5284/1126087.
- Vincent, Alex (2000). Roman Roads of Sussex. Middleton Press. ISBN 1-901706-48-6.
