= Bignor Roman Villa =

Ancient site in West Sussex, England

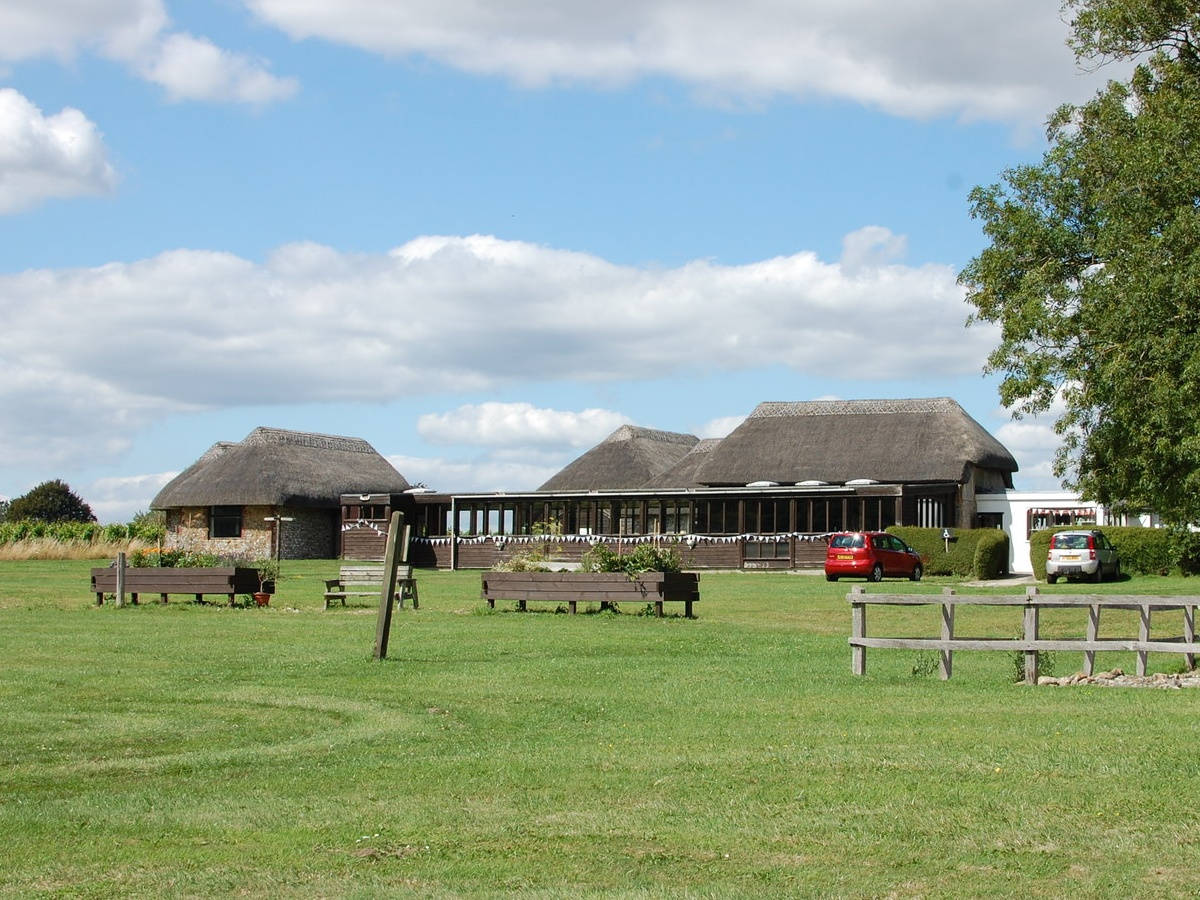
- Bignor Roman Villa, museum buildings

- Location within West Sussex

General information
- Architectural style: Romano-British Villa
- Location: Bignor, England grid reference SU988147, United Kingdom
- Coordinates: 50.92325°N 0.59475°W
- Construction started: c. 190 AD
- Completed: c. 350 AD
- Closed: c. 400 AD (abandoned)

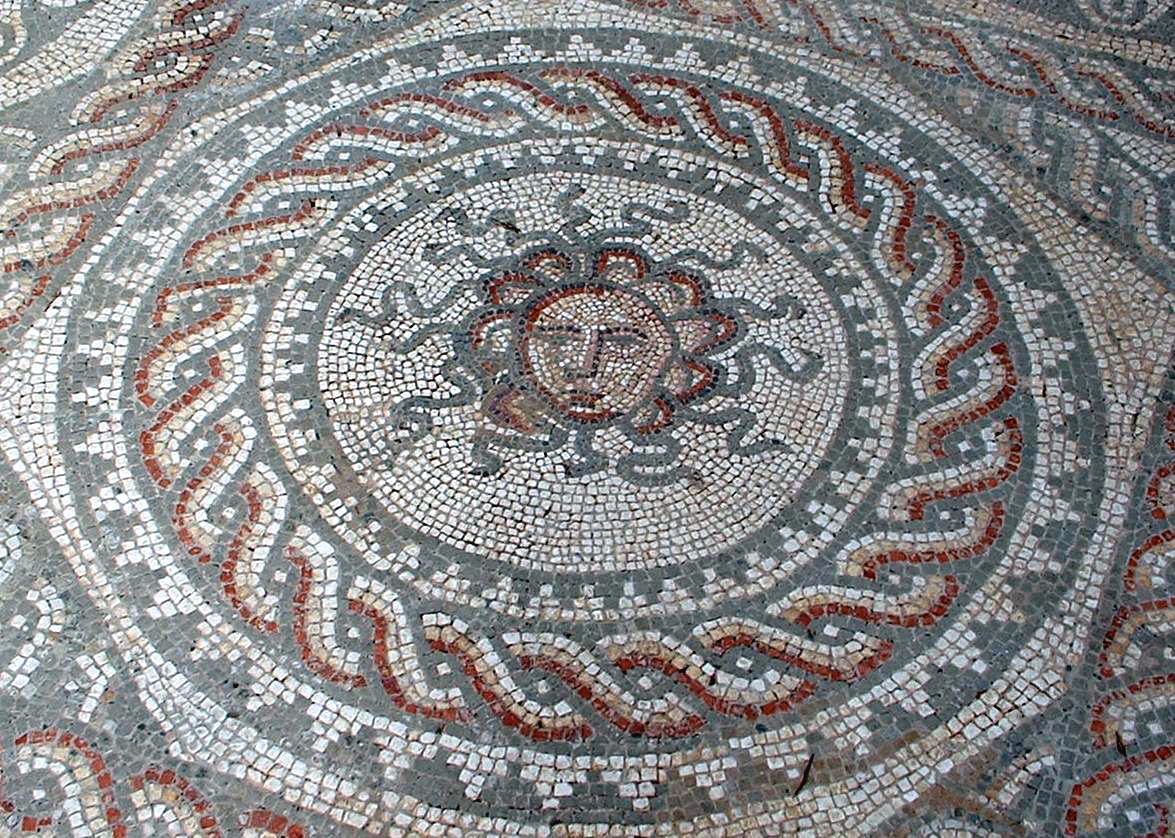
Medusa mosaic

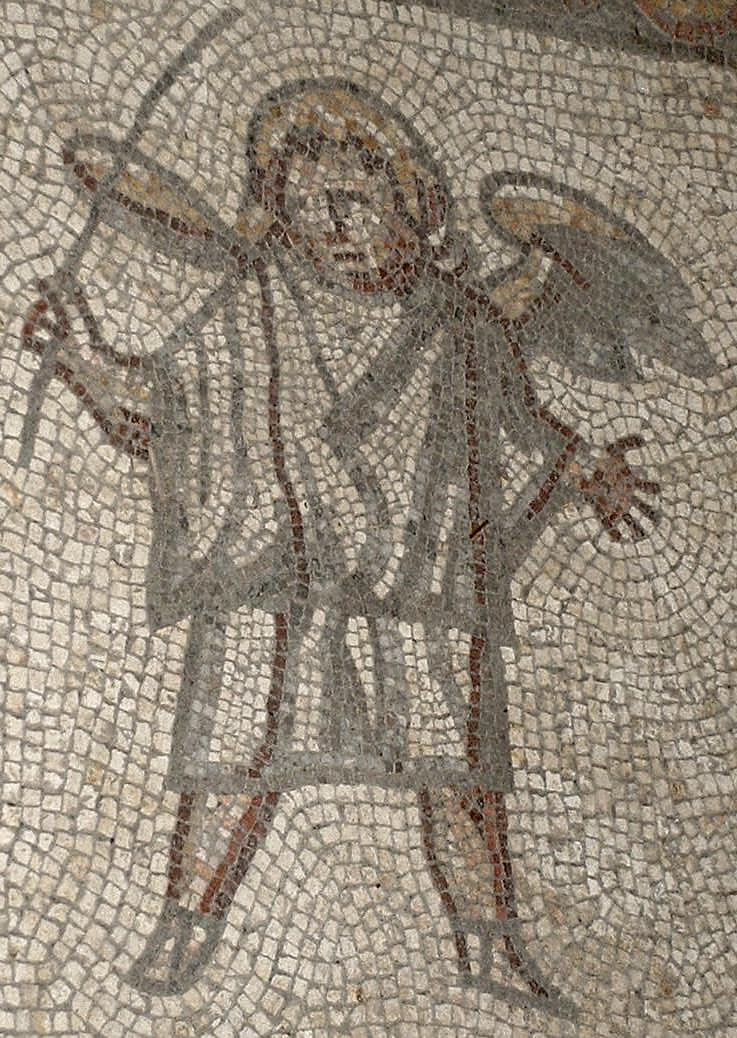
Gladiator mosaic

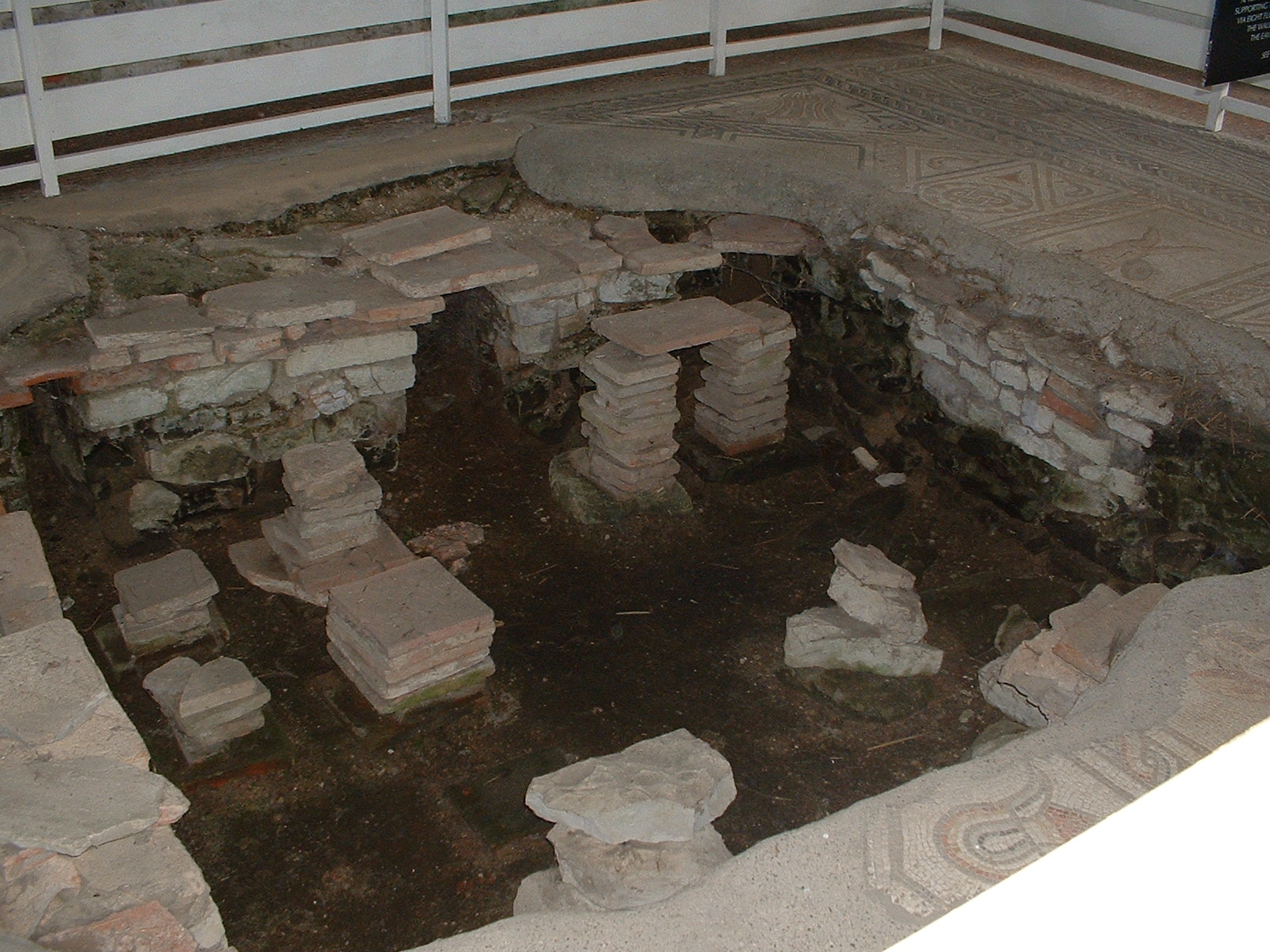
Hypocaust

Bignor Roman Villa is a large Roman courtyard villa which has been excavated and put on public display on the Bignor estate in the English county of West Sussex. It is well known for its high quality mosaic floors, which are some of the most complete and intricate in the country. It is managed by the Bignor Roman Villa Charitable Trust, a registered charity.

== Location ==
The villa is situated just north of the South Downs close to Stane Street, about nine miles northeast of Chichester (the Roman city of Noviomagus Reginorum) and the nearby and much larger Fishbourne Roman Palace. It is on the south-facing slope of a ridge of greensand which provided better conditions for agriculture than the nearby chalk; this fact and its proximity to Roman Chichester meant that the owners were able to become wealthy from farming.

== History and structure ==
The existence of a Romano-British farmstead on the site by the end of the 1st century is indicated by finds, but the earliest structural remains are of a simple timber farm structure dating to around 190 AD. A four-roomed stone building was built in the middle of the 3rd century AD, and this was extended between c.240 and 290 AD by the addition of a few new rooms, a hypocaust, and a portico that faced east towards Stane Street.

This building became the western wing when north and south wings were added at the turn of the fourth century. In its final form, the villa consisted of some sixty-five rooms surrounding a courtyard, with a number of outlying farm buildings. The latest phase of building involved additions to the north wing between c.300 and 350 AD, and it is here that most of the fine mosaics are located.

The later history of the villa is not well known, but it appears to have gradually declined in status, rather than suffering a catastrophic fate, such as the fire that destroyed most of Fishbourne Palace.

== Discovery and excavations ==
George Tupper, a farmer, discovered the villa in 1811 when his plough hit a large stone. It was almost entirely excavated by John Hawkins who lived at nearby Bignor Park, and the antiquary, Samuel Lysons. Opened to the public in 1814, it rapidly became a tourist attraction, with nearly a thousand entries in the visitors' book in the first nine months.

By 1815 the remains of a substantial villa had been uncovered and protective buildings had been erected over several of the mosaics. In 1818 Samuel Lysons read his third and final paper on the villa to the Society of Antiquaries. He had already published a series of engravings of the villa with the help of Richard Smirke and Charles Stothard. These engravings together with his three papers and his and his brother's correspondence with Hawkins form the only record of the original excavations. Excavations ceased in 1819 after Samuel Lysons' death.

No further work was undertaken on the site until 1925 when S. E. Winbolt did some minor work. Between 1956 and 1962 Sheppard Frere re-excavated parts of the villa in the first attempt to determine its chronology. Since then Thomas Tupper, the direct descendant of the discoverer, whose family still owns the site, has undertaken further excavations: with Margaret Rule in the 1970s, and David Rudling in the 1980s.

== Mosaics ==
The rooms on display today are mostly located at the west end of the north wing, including a summer and winter (underfloor heated) dining room. The bathhouse is to the southeast. The rooms contain some of the best Roman mosaics to be found in Great Britain, both in terms of preservation, artistic merit and detailing.

The Greek-key-patterned northern corridor extends for some 79 ft (24m) making it the longest in Britain.
