= Stane Street =

Roman road in southern England

Coordinates: 51.11362°N 0.38538°W

- Roman Road
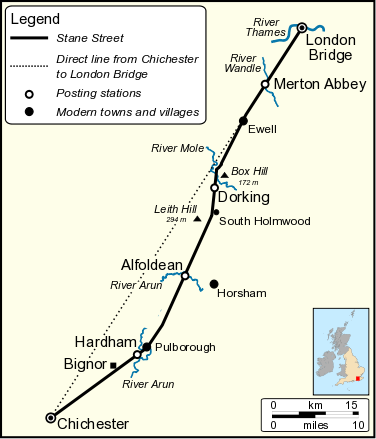
- Map of Stane Street showing the direct line from London Bridge to Chichester and the actual course of the road. The positions of Bignor Villa and the four posting stations (the northern two supposed) are shown. The modern courses of the three major rivers crossed by the road are also displayed.

Route information
- Length: 91 km (57 mi)
- History: Constructed in 1st century AD, several sections remain in use today
- Time period: Roman Britain
- Margary number: 15

Major junctions
- From: Londinium (London)
- To: Noviomagus Reginorum (Chichester)

Location
- Country: United Kingdom
- Counties: Greater London, Surrey, West Sussex

Road network
- Roman roads in Britannia

Stane Street is the modern name of the 91 km-long (57 mi) Roman road in southern England that linked Londinium (London) to Noviomagus Reginorum (Chichester). The exact date of construction is uncertain; however, on the basis of archaeological artefacts discovered along the route, it was in use by 70 AD and may have been built in the first decade of the Roman occupation of Britain (as early as 43–53 AD).

Stane Street shows clearly the engineering principles that the Romans used when building roads. A straight-line alignment from London Bridge to Chichester would have required steep crossings of the North Downs, Greensand Ridge and South Downs. The road was therefore designed to exploit a natural gap in the North Downs cut by the River Mole and to pass to the east of the high ground of Leith Hill, before following flatter land in the River Arun valley to Pulborough. The direct survey line was followed only for the northernmost 20 km (12 mi) from London to Ewell. At no point does the road lie more than 10 km (6 mi) from the direct line from London Bridge to Chichester.

Today the Roman road is easily traceable on modern maps. Much of the route is followed by the A3, A24, A29 and A285, although most of the course through the modern county of Surrey has either been completely abandoned or is followed only by bridlepaths. Earthworks associated with the road are visible in many places where the course is not overlain by modern roads. Several parts of Stane Street are listed as scheduled monuments, including the well-preserved section from Mickleham Downs to Thirty Acres Barn, Ashtead.

== Etymology ==
Stane is an old spelling of "stone" (Old English: stān) which was commonly used to differentiate paved Roman roads from muddy native trackways. The name of the road is first recorded as Stanstret in both the 1270 Feet of Fines and the 1279 Assizes Rolls of Ockley. Some historical sources refer to the road as 'Stone Street'. There is no surviving record of the road's original Roman name.

== Dating evidence ==
A number of first-century pottery fragments have been found along the road, including samian ware of Claudian date at Pulborough. The earliest coins found along the route are from the reigns of Claudius (41–54 AD), Nero (54–68) and Vespasian (69-79), consistent with the road being in use by 60 to 70 AD. Stane Street may in fact have been constructed during the first decade of Roman occupation, as early as 43–53 AD. Archaeological evidence from later periods includes coins from the reigns of Titus (79–81), Domitian (81–96), Nerva (96–98), Hadrian (117–138), Commodus (180–192), Severus Alexander (222–235), Gallienus (260–268), Claudius Gothicus (268–270) and Constantine the Great (306–337).

== Surveying ==
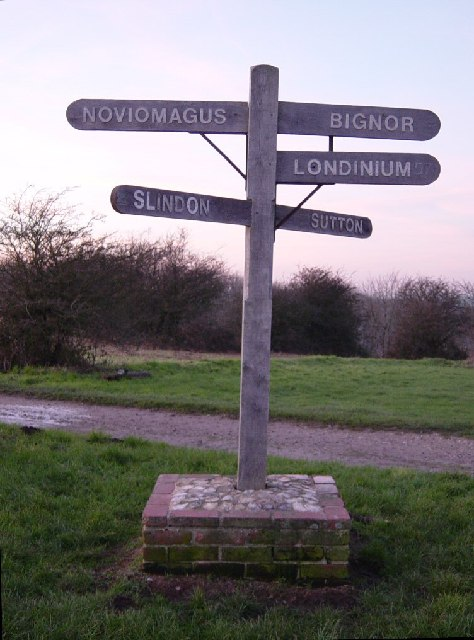
The 'Roman Signpost' on Bignor Hill.

The direct line from London Bridge to Chichester passes over the North Downs at Ranmore (200 m (660 ft) above ordnance datum) and the Greensand Ridge at Holmbury St Mary (260 m (850 ft) above OD). The steep gradients that would have been required if the road had followed a direct line would not have been practical for wheeled traffic. The road was therefore designed to cross the North Downs by a natural breach cut by the River Mole and to pass to the east of the high ground of Leith Hill.

The geology of the region was also considered and the road leaves the direct line at Ewell to move onto the well-drained chalk of the North Downs, in preference to remaining on the London Clay. The road is able to make a more gentle ascent of the South Downs escarpment at Bignor than was possible at East Lavington and the chosen route avoids the need to cross the steep-sided River Lavant valley at East Dean.

No evidence survives as to how the course of the road was surveyed.

== Design and construction ==
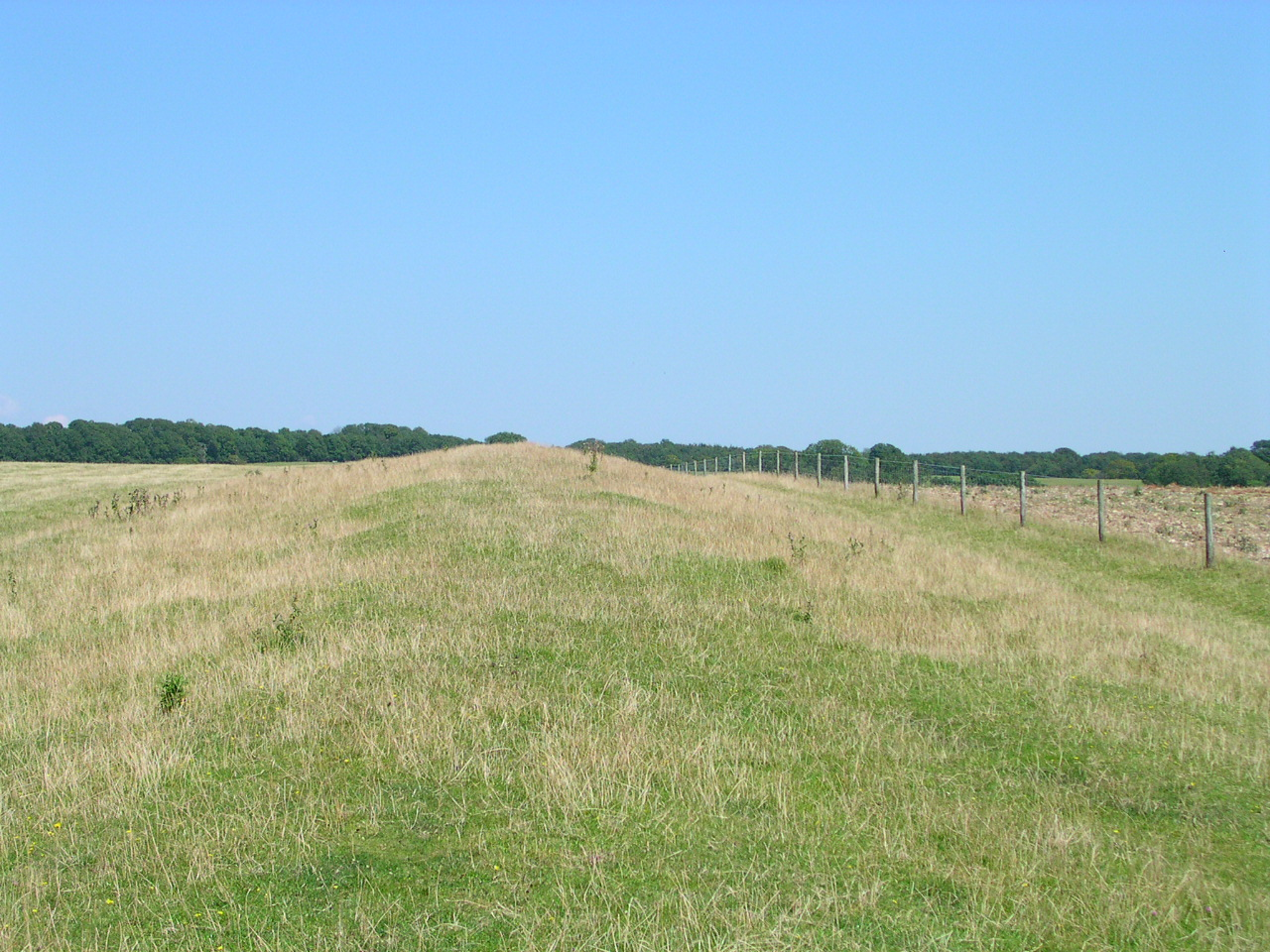
The Stane Street agger under pasture on the South Downs near Bignor Hill.

For much of its length, Stane Street consisted of a central agger (a raised embankment on which the upper road surface was laid), with parallel ditches either side. A variety of local materials was used to build the road, sometimes supplemented with stone brought from elsewhere. The agger was often constructed of alternating layers of sand and gravel paved with large flint nodules, or sandstone, surfaced with smaller flint or sand and gravel. The metalling was generally about 30 cm (1 ft) thick at the centre and had a pronounced camber.

Around Merton Priory, the surface consisted of sub-rounded flints and gravel embedded in sand and silt. Close to Tyrell's Wood and Mickleham Downs, Stane Street consisted of water-washed pebbles laid directly onto the chalk, which are thought to have given this section its local name, 'Pebble Lane'. Near to the Alfoldean station the metalling was constructed from iron slag in a solid 30 cm-thick (1 ft) mass, topped with a double layer of sandstone slats.

Although the actual width of the metalling varies from place to place, the average width of the paved road is 7.4 m (24 ft), or 25 Roman pedes. This is wider than the average 6.51 m (21.4 ft) or 22 pedes for Roman roads in Britain.

The distance between the outer ditches also varies and was found to be 12–16 m (39–52 ft) at Merton Priory and 27 m (89 ft) at Westhampnett.

== Posting stations ==
Posting stations or mansiones were provided at regular intervals (generally every 15–20 km (9.3–12.4 mi)) along Roman roads, so that official messengers could change horses and travellers could rest. Typically, they were rectangular fortified sites of about 1 ha (2.5 acres). Mansiones have been identified on Stane Street at Alfoldean and Hardham, each of which was close to a crossing point of the River Arun.

The Alfoldean mansio, which is partly covered by the A29 road, was investigated in 2006 by the Channel 4 archaeological television programme Time Team. Excavations revealed the remains of a two-storey mansio built around a courtyard and also many other buildings. The site was enclosed by massive ramparts and ditches 4 m (13 ft) wide and as deep, which were dated by pottery finds to around 90 AD. The ditches were filled in by the mid-third century. The team's view was that the site had been an administrative and taxation centre for the Wealden iron industry.

A geophysical survey of the Hardham mansio was carried out in 1997, which revealed that the station was roughly square with a total area of 1.4 ha (3.5 acres). Much of the western side was destroyed by the construction of the Pulborough to Midhurst railway, but evidence of the north and south gateways, as well as traces of the outer ditches, remain. Cremation burials dating from the late Iron Age and early Romano-British periods have been found both inside and just outside of the enclosure, however, their relationship to the rest of the mansio is unclear. The Hardham station is thought to have become disused by the end of the second century AD.

Given its length, Stane Street would be expected to have had two further mansiones. Stations at Merton Priory and Dorking are considered most likely, based on the distances between them, though the remains would now be hidden under modern development. Alternative sites for the posting stations have also been suggested at Ewell, (Note: Ewell was one of only two known large Roman towns in the modern county of Surrey, the other being Staines-upon-Thames.) the Burford Bridge (where the road crossed the River Mole) and Pixham (where the road is thought to have crossed the Pipp Brook).

== Route ==
=== London Bridge to Ewell ===
The northernmost section of Stane Street, from London Bridge to Ewell, is the only part of the road which lies on the direct alignment to the east gate of Chichester, (although the builders made short local deviations to avoid difficult ground conditions). From the start of the route on the south bank of the River Thames, the course is followed by the A3 as far as the northeast corner of Clapham Common and from there by the A24 as far as Ewell.

The site of the Roman London Bridge, at the northern end of Stane Street, is approximately 60 m (197 ft) east of the modern bridge. From there the route heads southwestwards, but between Borough and Elephant & Castle tube stations, it deviates from the direct line to Chichester to run along Newington Causeway, most likely to avoid marshy ground to the east. It then continues southwestwards as Kennington Park Road and Clapham Road. The course of the road around Clapham Common is unclear and it may have remained on the direct alignment (which would have required a descent to run alongside a former tributary of the Thames) or followed a similar route to the A24 along the south side of the Common, which would have allowed it to remain on higher ground.

Stane Street crossed the River Wandle close to the site of Merton Priory. The course of the river has changed since Roman times and the original crossing point (believed to have been a ford, although there may have been a bridge for pedestrians) was close to the site of Colliers Wood tube station. Excavations carried out between 1997 and 1999 showed that the road was approximately 14 m (46 ft) wide and the surface consisted primarily of pebbles compacted into silt and the natural gravel below. Two metal brooches, likely to have been worn by high-status individuals, were among the archaeological artefacts uncovered.

A rare example of a Roman barrow, a circular mound roughly 32 m (105 ft) in diameter and 3.4 m (11 ft) high, survives in Morden Park approximately 350 m (380 yd) west of the road. From Morden, Stane Street passes through Sutton Common and forms the northern boundary of Sutton. The name 'Sutton' is derived from Old English sūth and tūn, meaning "the south enclosure", which may relate to its position in relation to the road. Stane Street runs along the western boundary of Nonsuch Park as it enters Surrey to the northeast of Ewell.

=== Ewell to the Burford Bridge ===
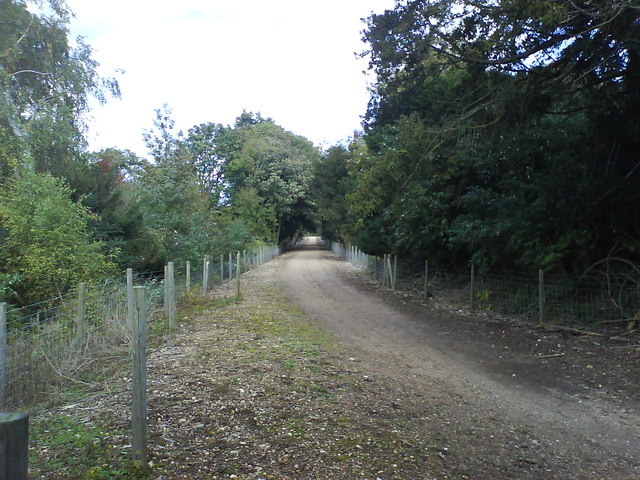
Stane Street as it passes Cherkley Court.

From the first to the fourth centuries AD, Ewell was a large Romano-British town. Stane Street approaches from the northeast, leaving the silty clays of the Reading Beds and moving briefly onto the better-draining Thanet Sands. Close to the present Church Street, the road makes a 23° turn to the south, to allow it to reach the Upper Chalk of the North Downs more quickly. It has been suggested that the road bends somewhat more sharply than was strictly necessary, possibly to avoid the Hogsmill Spring, which may have held religious significance for the local British tribes. A second change in alignment occurs where the Epsom to Sutton railway line cuts across the road.

The section from Thirty Acres Barn, Ashtead to Mickleham Downs is well preserved and is listed as a scheduled monument. A 2020 Lidar survey revealed that Stane Street was built across an earlier field system, although it is unclear whether the area was under active cultivation at the time of construction. The considerable evidence of both Bronze Age and Iron Age activity on Mickleham Downs suggests that a pre-existing early trackway was adapted and straightened by the Romans, to create this part of Stane Street.

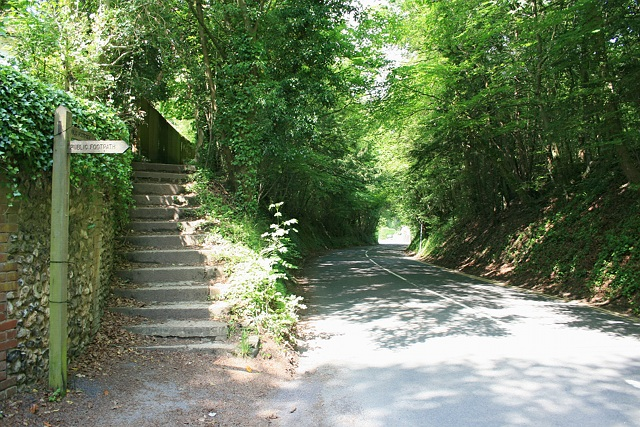
Looking north along the B2209 towards Juniper Hall.

The confirmed route reaches the southwestern corner of Mickleham Downs close to Juniper Hall Field Centre, but from there south, the course is more uncertain. Stane Street is thought to have taken the same route as the modern B2209, the surface of which has been worn down over centuries of use to produce the sunken lane visible today. The footpath on the western side of the modern road may indicate the extent to which the original Roman road surface has been eroded.

Stane Street crossed the River Mole via a ford close to the site of the modern Burford Bridge. Excavations carried out in 1937 revealed a "flint-surfaced approach to [a] ford at low level having all the signs of Roman workmanship".

=== The route through Dorking ===
Although no conclusive evidence for the route has been found in the 5 km (3 mi) 'gap' between the Mole crossing and North Holmwood, Stane Street is thought to have passed through Dorking which was a Romano-British settlement. In the 1960s, the historian Ivan Margary proposed that the road headed directly for the town centre from the Burford Bridge, an alignment that would have taken it beneath the present day Ashcombe School site. However, excavations in the mid-2000s at Westhumble and Denbies Wine Estate failed to find any trace of the road along his proposed route. (Note: Before vines were planted in the 1980s, the vineyard was the site of Bradley Farm, the fields of which were subject to regular ploughing.) The current consensus is that this section of Stane Street most likely lies under the A24 dual carriageway.

Excavations in the 1970s and 1980s (in Horsham Road and Church Street respectively) uncovered sections of road in Dorking: however, they could not be conclusively identified as Stane Street. (Note: In the case of the Horsham Road site, the road could not be definitively identified as Roman, although the depth (1.4 m below ground level) is consistent with that of other parts of Stane Street.) It seems likely that the A2003 follows the general route as it left the town to the south. The confirmed alignment reappears in the south of North Holmwood, close to the junction of the A24 dual carriageway and Spook Hill.

Based on the distance from Alfoldean (some 18.3 km (11.4 mi) to the town centre), there would be expected to have been a mansio in the Dorking area. Numerous excavations and chance findings along the length of the High Street (from Pump Corner in the west to Pippbrook House in the east) have produced coins, pottery sherds and other items that indicate a Roman presence. There was also a Roman villa nearby at Abinger Hammer. Both Margary and the writer, Hilaire Belloc, proposed that the mansio was located at the western end of the High Street, in the 'triangle' between West Street and South Street. Excavations taking place in 2013, during the rebuilding of the Waitrose supermarket in South Street, failed to produce any significant finds of Roman origin that might support the presence of either a posting station or even Stane Street itself in this area. Alternative sites for the mansio have also been suggested at the Burford Bridge (the 'bur' part of the name is derived from the Old English burh meaning a fortified site, which may reference a guard post or larger encampment defending the ford over the River Mole) and at Pixham (where there may have been a Roman villa).

=== North Holmwood to Pulborough ===
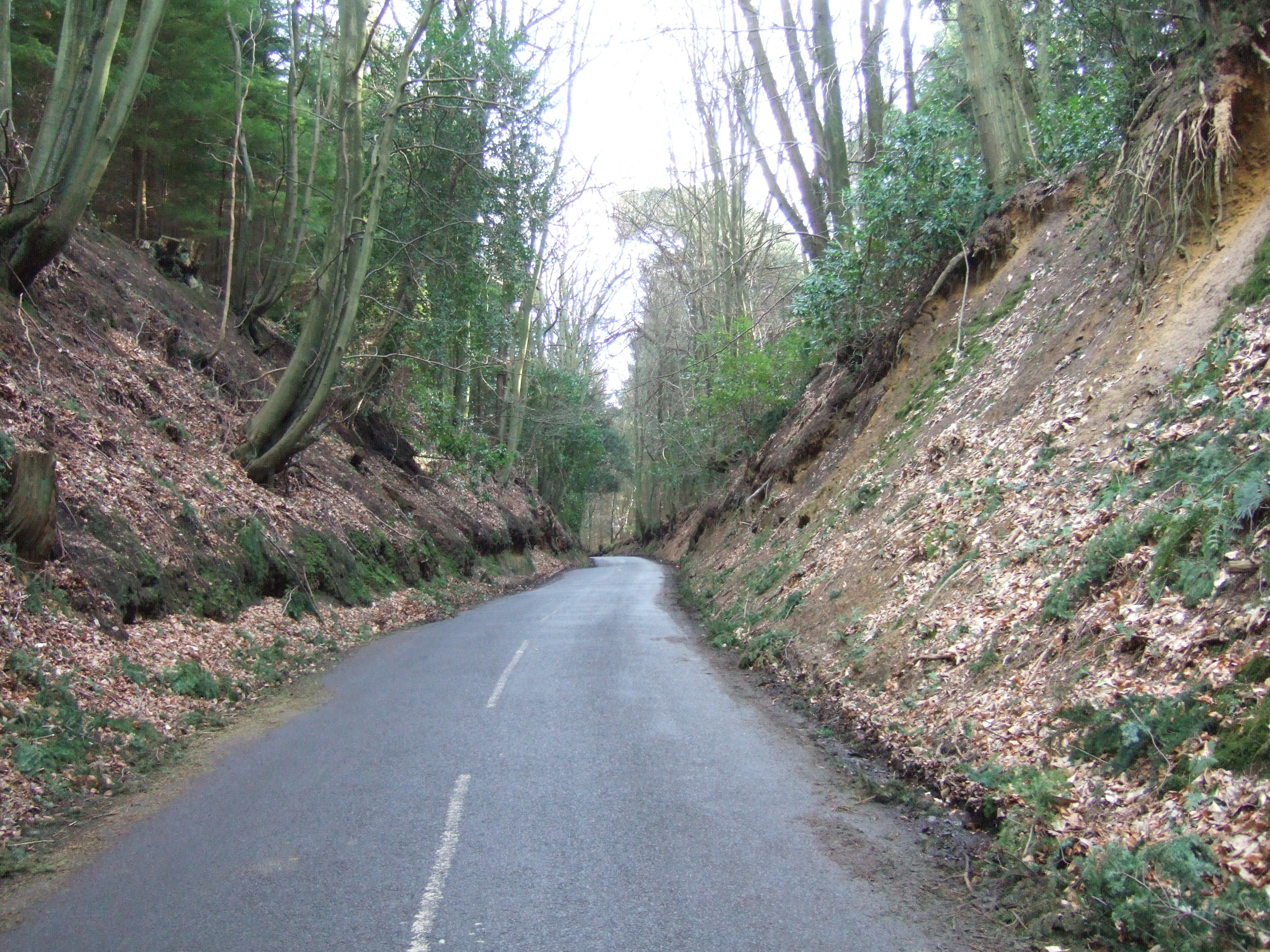
The Anglo-Saxon road south from Dorking (now Coldharbour Lane) remains on the Lower Greensand as it ascends the eastern slopes of Leith Hill.

As the route of Stane Street leaves Dorking, the underlying geology changes from Lower Greensand to impermeable Weald Clay. From North Holmwood to Ockley (a distance of 5.5 km (3 mi)), the exact route has been confirmed by a series of excavations. Much of this section remains in good condition (albeit buried below ground level), although the upper surface appears to have been removed (presumably to supply stone to local building projects). A large quantity of flints, which do not occur in the Weald Clay, were found in the remaining core. The flint is likely to have been quarried to the north of Dorking and then transported to the site, suggesting that this part of the road was built from north to south.

The Saxon and medieval road from Dorking to the south bypasses this section, by climbing the eastern slopes of Leith Hill as far as Coldharbour, before descending to Ockley. Although the later route is longer, steeper and requires an ascent to an altitude of 225 m (738 ft), it remains on the freer draining Lower Greensand. It is possible that, once the upper surface of the Roman road had been robbed, the corresponding section of Stane Street (on Weald Clay) was impassable in the wetter months.

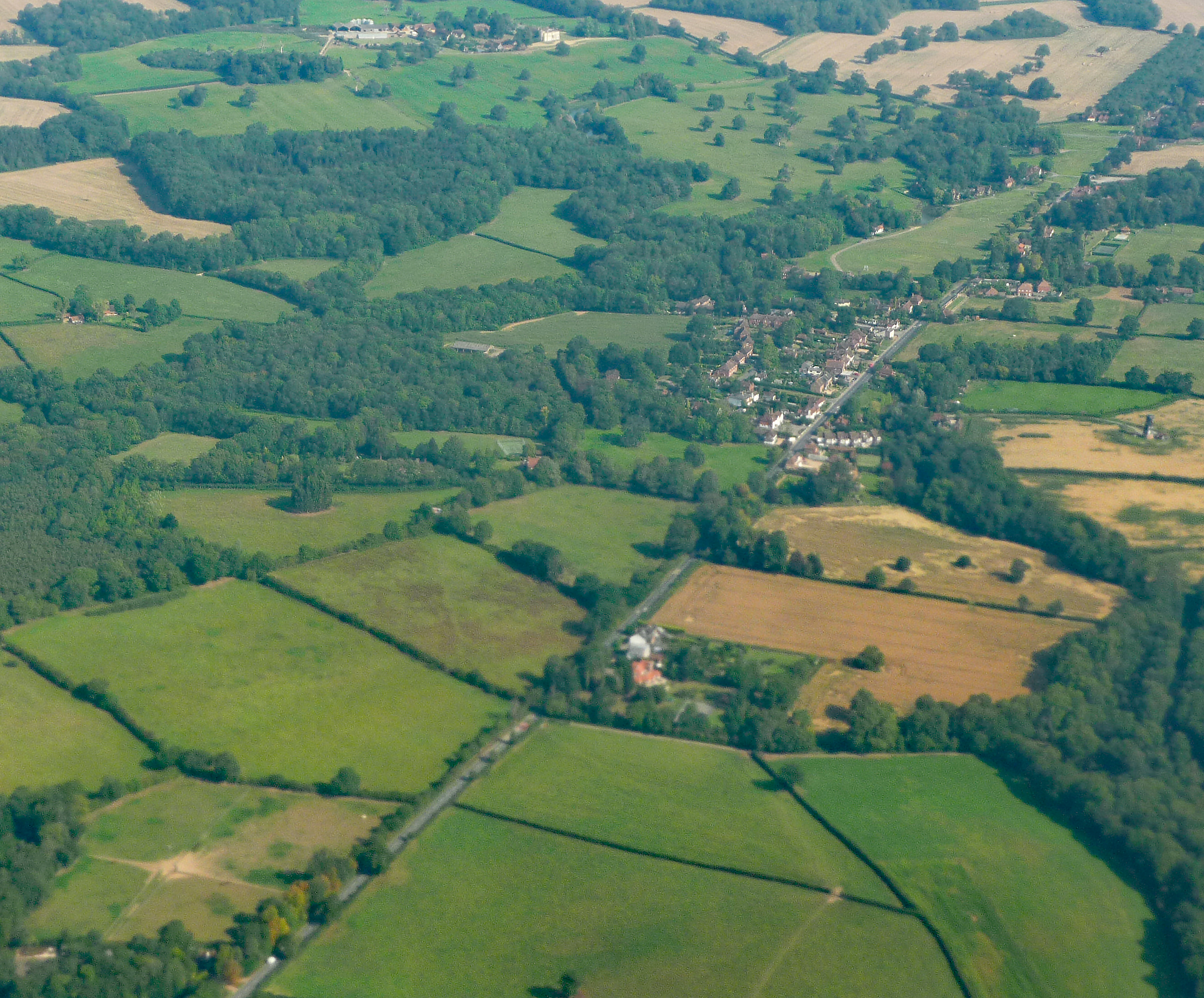
Aerial view of Ockley, looking north. Stane Street is the straight line running diagonally from bottom left to top right.

A change of direction occurs to the west of South Holmwood, where the road takes up a line sighted from London Bridge to Pulborough. The only significant deviation is at Okewood Hill, where the road loops to the west for around 200 m (220 yd) to cross a small stream at a convenient fording point. The A29, which follows the route through Ockley, also leaves the direct London Bridge-Pulborough alignment at this point, but turns instead to the east. This section of Stane Street is largely flat, with the exception of the hill at Rowhook, 86 m (282 ft) above OD, which the A29 avoids.

Just to the south of the steep descent from Rowhook through Roman Woods, the road crossed the River Arun. Some of the timber piles on which the bridge was built are still present in the river bed. Scattered Roman tiles and squared stone in the river bed show that stone bridge piers were built above the piling. The Alfoldean mansio is some 30 m (33 yd) south of the bridge site. A small, linear settlement grew up alongside the 300 m (300 yd) stretch of road immediately to the south of the posting station.

The 16 km (9.9 mi) section of the route south from Alfoldean to Pulborough is overlain by the A29. The general alignment is a straight line sighted from Brockham Warren (on Box Hill) to Borough Hill (near North Heath), although the modern road deviates from the original route of Stane Street for short distances, especially around Slinfold. The modern roads also curve away from the straight alignment through Billingshurst, however in this instance, the Roman road is thought to have done the same to accommodate the local topography and ground conditions.

=== Pulborough to Chichester ===
Stane Street crossed the River Arun for a second time at Pulborough Bridge. Although the original crossing is lost, a medieval-style bridge was built in 1777 on the same site. The road was laid on top of a 580 m (630 yd) causeway to cross marshy ground on the south side of the river, over which the modern A29 runs as far as Winters Farm.

The Greensand Way Roman road to Lewes joined the road at the Hardham mansio, to the south west of Pulborough. From here Stane Street turns to run straight towards the east gate of Chichester, passing the notable Roman villa at Bignor. It makes a slight detour from the direct line to ascend the escarpment of the South Downs via a spur of chalk at Bignortail Wood. The road is visible as a terrace, cut into the steep hillside, as it climbs towards Bignor Hill.

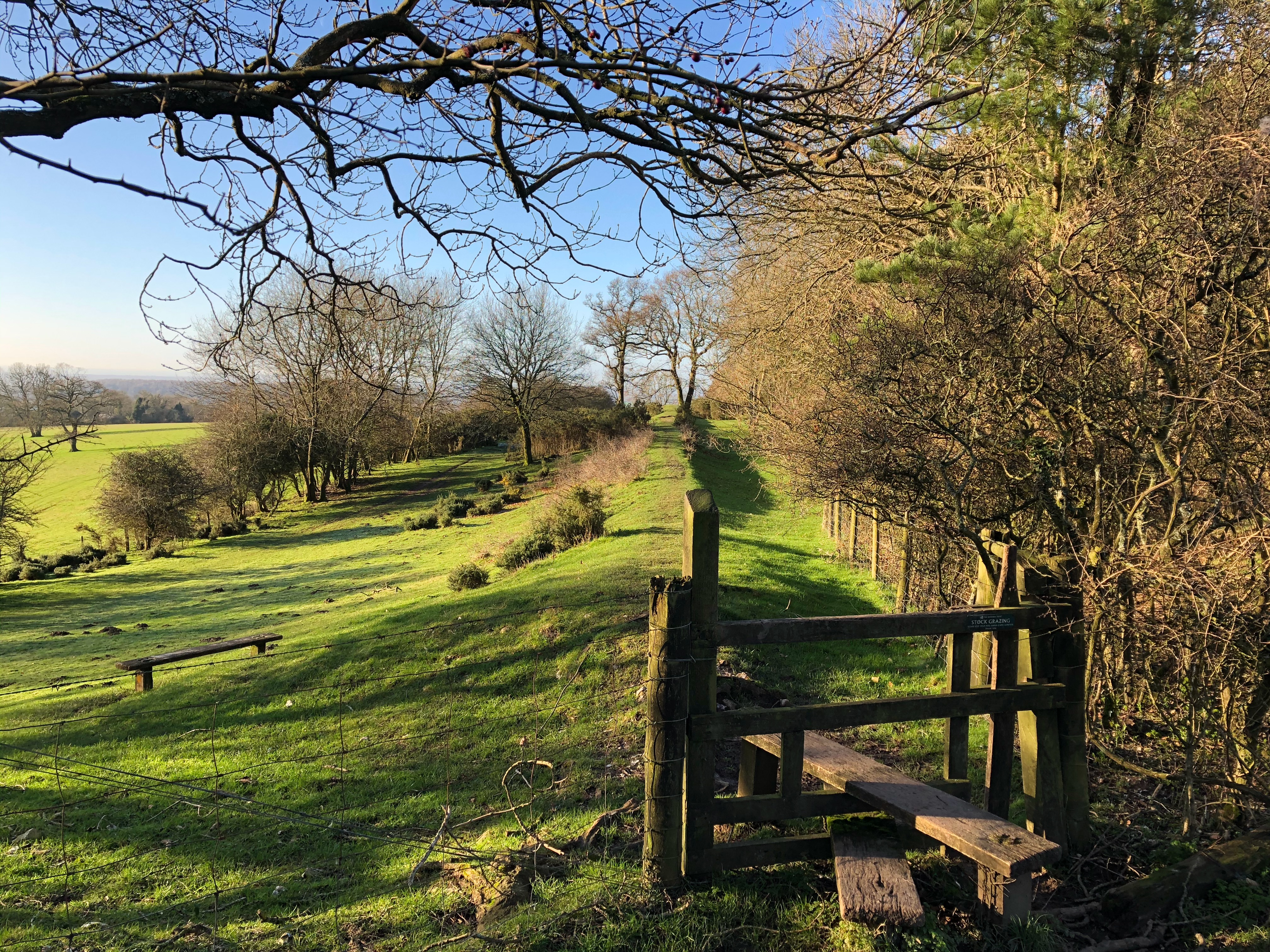
The narrow agger at Gumber Down

As the road crosses Gumber Down, the agger narrows to a width of 1 m (3 ft), although its height often exceeds 1.5 m (5 ft). The distinctive shape is thought to result from a series of post-Roman reconstructions, which converted Stane Street to a prominent boundary bank. (Note: The unusual shape of the agger is unlikely to have been caused by erosion, which generally results in a spreading and flattening of the embankment.) An excavation carried out in 1913, showed that the roadway had previously been much wider and the distance between the outer ditches was measured as 28 m (92 ft).

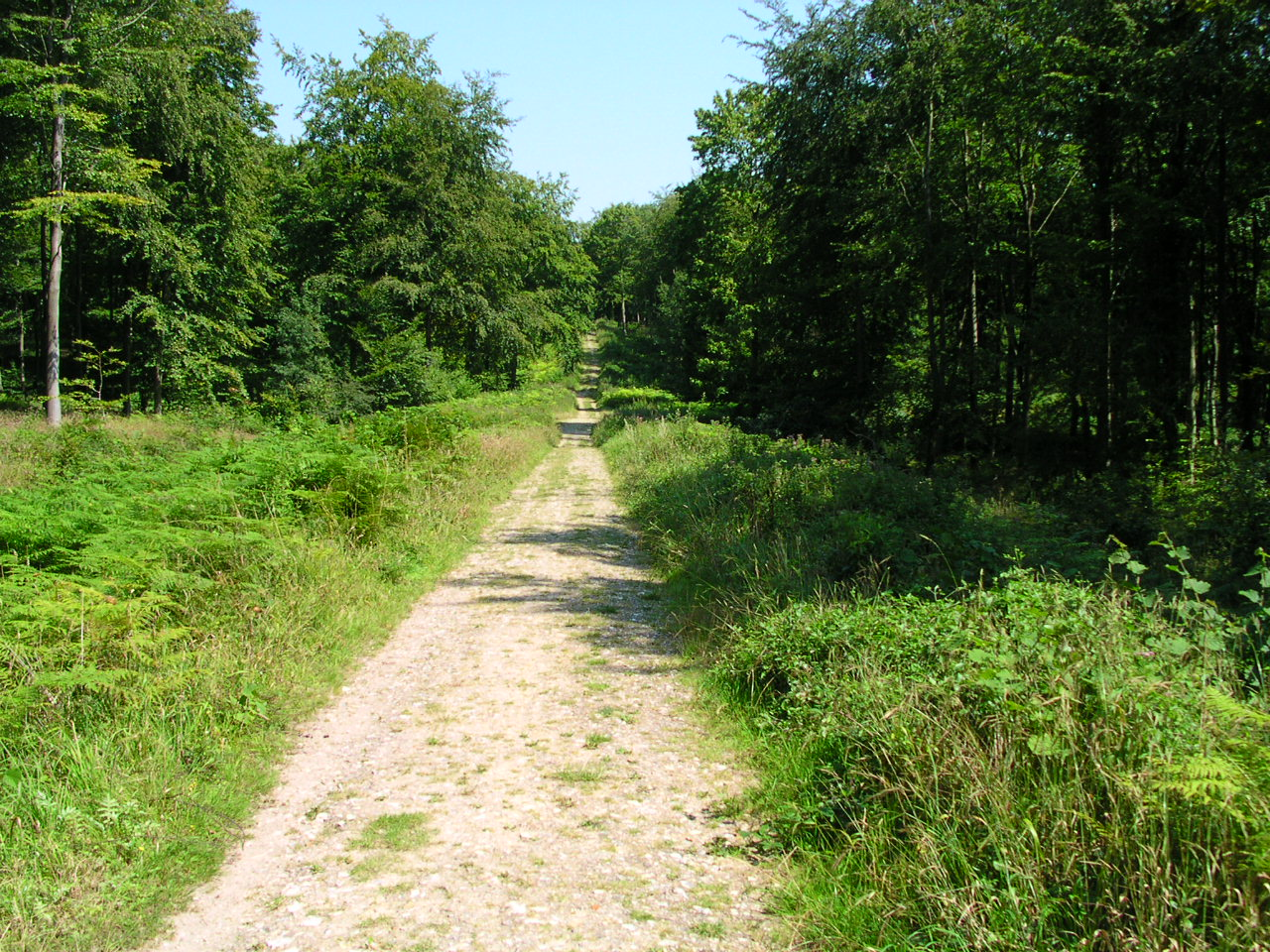
Looking northeast along Stane Street at Eartham Woods, West Sussex.

Through Eartham Woods where the Monarch's Way long-distance path follows the route, the flint surface of the well-preserved road is exposed and the trees are mostly cut back to the boundary ditches. The A285 joins the route at the western side of Eartham Woods, although it leaves the alignment almost immediately to avoid the ascent of Halnaker Hill, before rejoining again for the final 7 km (4.3 mi) stretch into Chichester.

It has been suggested that the section of road between Chichester and Hardham was the first part of Stane Street to be constructed and that (based on archaeological finds) the Romans straightened and improved an existing Iron Age trackway.

=== Branch roads ===
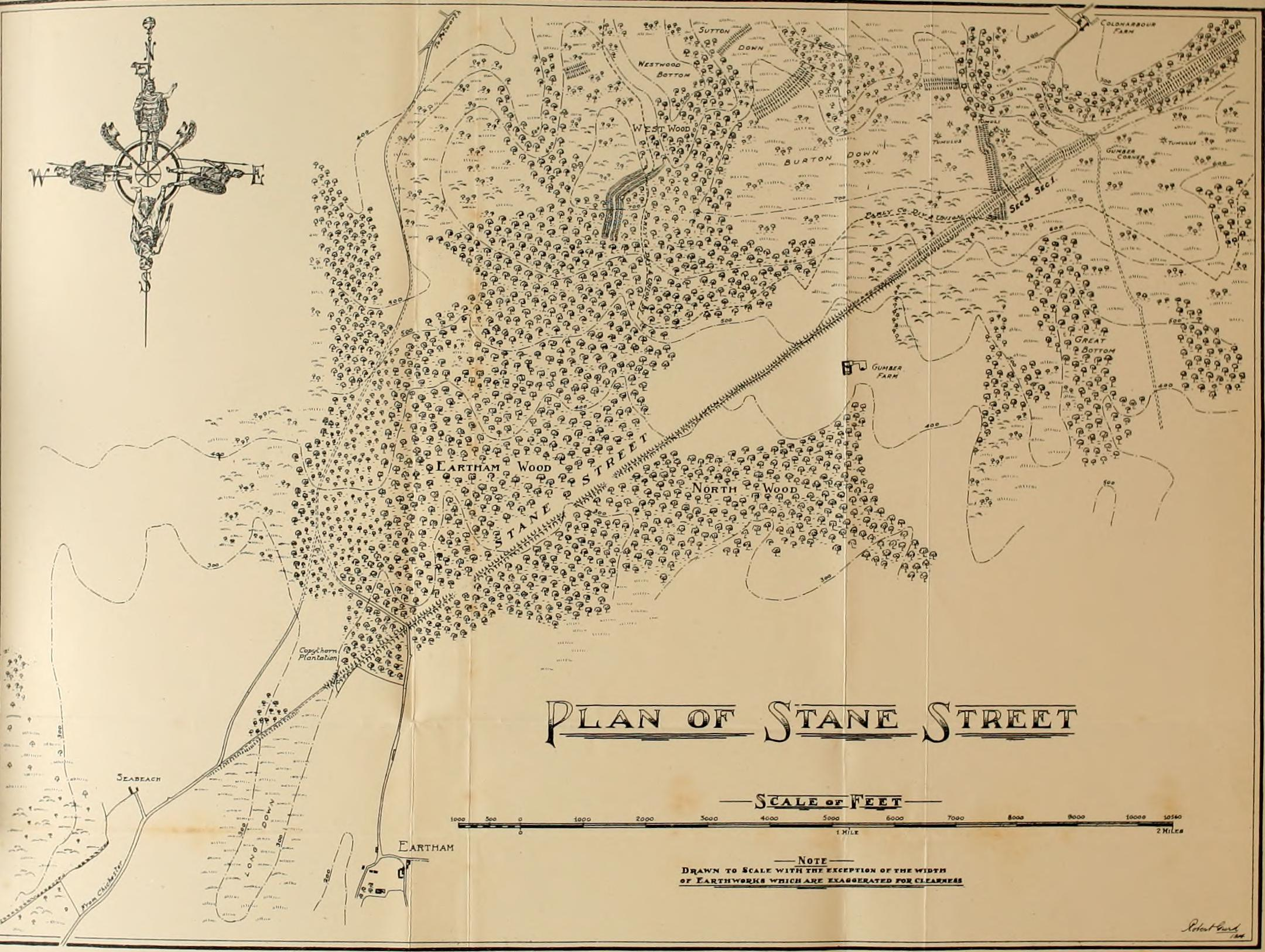
Map of Eartham Woods dated 1848, showing the route of Stane Street.

At least five Roman roads are known to have had junctions with Stane Street. The London to Brighton Way road diverged at Kennington Park, before passing through Croydon, Godstone, Haywards Heath and Burgess Hill to cross the South Downs at Clayton. From Rowhook a road went northwest to Farley Heath at the foot of the North Downs where it passes through a Roman temple site. To the north of Pulborough another road branched off in a southeasterly direction to meet the Greensand Way at Wiggonholt. It is unclear whether it continued beyond this towards Storrington.

The Sussex Greensand Way diverges from Stane Street at the Hardham mansio, following a well-drained sandstone ridge east to Lewes. At Westhampnett, near the Rolls-Royce works, the Roman coastal road, which became the older A27 road, branches at the mini-roundabout. The Roman road continues via Broadwater, Sompting, Lancing (along a road still named The Street) and part of the Old Shoreham Road (the A270) through to Novus Portus (around modern Portslade).

== Decline and partial abandonment ==
The military importance of Stane Street appears to have declined through the second half of the Roman occupation of Britain. The mansio at Hardham is thought to have become disused by the end of the second century AD and the road is absent from the third-century Antonine Itinerary, which indicates that the preferred route from Chichester to London was via Winchester. (Note: It has been suggested that the steep gradients encountered on Stane Street, as well as the waterlogging of the clay soils of the Weald, led to the apparent demise of the road. Climate changes associated with the end of the Roman Warm Period may also have rendered river crossings impassable during periods of wet weather.) Nevertheless, Stane Street continued to be an important trade route until at least the early fourth century, and goods transported along the road included pottery from Rowlands Castle.

The extent to which the Anglo-Saxons used and maintained the route reflects the changes in government and economic activity which took place after the end of Roman rule in Britain. Although Londinium had been abandoned as a city by the fifth century, the sphere of influence of its successor, Lundenwick, was sufficiently large to ensure the retention of the stretch of road between Ewell and Southwark. (Note: It has been suggested that the route between Ewell and Thirty Acres Barn, Ashtead fell out of use as a result of the enclosure of Woodcote Park in 1155, which would have prevented access to the section between Headley Road and Chalk Lane (to the south of Epsom).) The emergence of Sussex as a political entity, decreased the importance of the north-south roads leading across the Weald to the former Roman capital and so much of the rest of Stane Street was abandoned. (Note: East-west 'ridgeway' routes (in particular those following the escarpments of the North and South Downs) increased in importance during the same period, especially after the annexation of Sussex by Wessex in around 827 AD.) The route between Alfoldean and Pulborough, which connects Billingshurst with two crossing points of the River Arun (and is followed by the A29 today), was probably maintained as a local link. Similarly, the 8 km (5 mi) stretch of road to the east of Chichester was a useful route to ascend onto the South Downs (and is followed by the A285 today).

Elsewhere the road was lightly used and was most likely quarried in the decades following the end of Roman rule, to provide stone to for local construction. Particularly where the route ran across Weald Clay, removal of the upper surface probably rendered the road unusable in the wetter months and subsequently all traces were eliminated by ploughing or urban development.

Daniel Defoe (the author of Robinson Crusoe) described the disappearance of Stane Street in his travelogue, A tour thro' the whole island of Great Britain (1724–1727), which describes the country shortly before the start of the Industrial Revolution:

Likewise the roads in Sussex, and that in particular which was formerly a Roman work, call'd Stony-street or Stone-street: Mr Cambden mentions it as going from Leatherhead to Darking and thro' Darking church-yard, then across a terrible deep country, call'd the Homeward, and so to Petworth and Arundel: But we see nothing of it now; and the country remains in the utmost distress for want of good roads: So also all over the Wild of Kent and Sussex is the same, where corn is cheap at the barn because it cannot be brought in.

== Historiography ==
Although knowledge of Stane Street appears to have continued from Anglo-Saxon times into the early modern period and beyond (as evidenced by a reference in Britannia by William Camden, first published in 1586), no systematic studies of the route were carried out until the early 20th century. The writer Hilaire Belloc published The Stane Street: A monograph in 1913, in which he attempted to reconstruct the entirety of the route. Since Belloc was not a trained surveyor, his work on the route to the north of Dorking contained significant inaccuracies, which W. A. Grant (a former captain in the Royal Engineers) attempted to address in his critical review, published in 1922. Excavations carried out by the amateur archaeologist S. E. Winbolt, detailed in his book With a spade on Stane Street, first published in 1936, made a significant contribution to our current understanding and formed the basis of the relevant chapter in Ivan Margary's book Roman Ways in the Weald, published in 1948. Margary number 15 is assigned to the road.

== Preservation ==
Several sections of Stane Street, including the mansiones at Alfoldean and Hardham, are listed as scheduled monuments.

A 32 m (105 ft) length of Stane Street at Redlands Wood near South Holmwood was restored by the archaeologist S. E. Winbolt in 1935. The section was turfed over to protect it for future generations.

== Bibliography ==
- Aubrey, John (1718). The natural history and antiquities of the county of Surrey: Begun in the year 1673, and continued to the present time. Vol. 1. London: E. Curll. OCLC 5796070.
- Belloc, Hilaire (1913). The Stane Street : A Monograph. London: Constable. OCLC 24076376.
- Bishop, MC (2014). The Secret History of the Roman Roads of Britain. Barnsley: Pen & Sword. ISBN 978-1-84-884615-9.
- Camden, William (1610). Britain, or a Chorographicall Description of the most flourishing Kingdomes, England, Scotland, and Ireland, and the Ilands adjoyning, out of the depth of Antiquitie. Translated by Holland, Philemon. London. OCLC 228715963. Archived from the original on 2 January 2021.
- Davies, Hugh (2002). Roads in Roman Britain. Stroud: Tempus. ISBN 978-0-75-242503-0.
- Grant, William A (1922). The topography of Stane Street: a critical review of The Stane Street by Hilaire Belloc. London: J Long. OCLC 752464523.
- Jenkins, Terrence (2014). Return to London. Kibworth Beauchamp: Matador. ISBN 978-1-78-306470-0.
- Johnston, DE (1979). An Illustrated History of Roman Roads in Britain. Spurbooks Ltd. ISBN 0-904978-33-8.
- Jones, Michael A (1996). The End of Roman Britain. Ithaca, NY: Cornell University Press. ISBN 0-8014-2789-4.
- Margary, Ivan D (1948). Roman Ways in the Weald. London: Phoenix House. OCLC 123188319.
- Margary, Ivan D (1973). Roman Roads in Britain (3rd ed.). London: John Baker. ISBN 0-212-97001-1.
- Skinner, Denys (2002). Sussex: People and History. Marlborough: Crowood. ISBN 978-1-86-126519-7.
- Smith, Robert P (1970). A History of Sutton AD 675–1960 (4th ed.). Thornton Heath: Derek W James. OCLC 29608477.
- Wilson, John Marius (1872). Imperial Gazetteer of England and Wales. Vol. VI. Edinburgh: A. Fullarton and Co. OCLC 20590530.
- Winbolt, SE (1936). With a spade on Stane Street. London: Methuen. OCLC 1170662508.

== See also ==
- Roman Britain
- Roman roads in Britain
- Chichester to Sidlesham Way
