= Alfoldean =

Roman mansio and settlement in England

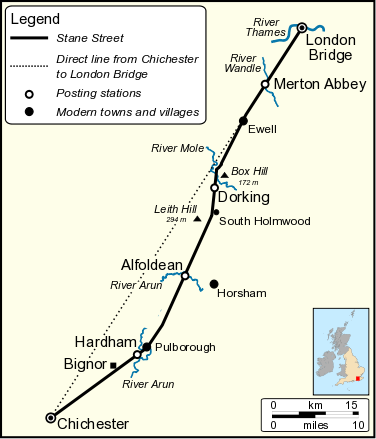
- Map of the Roman road of Stane Street showing the direct line from London Bridge to Chichester and the actual course of the road. Alfoldean can be seen straddling the road to the immediate south of the River Arun.
- Interactive map of Alfoldean
- Type: Roman mansio and settlement
- Periods: Roman Empire
- Location: South of Alfoldean Bridge, Slinfold, West Sussex, United Kingdom

Site notes
- Archaeologists: Samuel Edward Winbolt (20th century); Time Team (2004)

Alfoldean was a Roman settlement founded in the Roman province of Britannia as a mansio on Stane Street where the road crosses the River Arun. Its remains are now near the village of Slinfold in West Sussex. They have been investigated by archaeologists including Samuel Edward Winbolt and Time Team.
