= Chichester to Sidlesham Way =

Roman road in England

The Chichester to Sidlesham Way was a Roman road between Noviomagus Reginorum (the ancient tribal centre of the Regni) and what is now Sidlesham, West Sussex.

== Background ==
The Regni were a pro-Roman subtribe of the Atrebates. The Regni had been trading with the Roman Empire before the Roman conquest of Britain, in AD 43. After the conquest the Romans divided the Atrebates into three cantons, with the Regni canton being centred on Noviomagus Reginorum (now Chichester, West Sussex).

The Chichester area provided a good base for the transfer of sea-borne goods and the storing and distributing of supplies to support the Roman conquest of south west Britain.

All over the Roman Empire, roads were carefully planned and laid out to link centres of occupation together.

== Route ==
The Chichester to Sidlesham Way was a minor Roman road designated RR156 under the Ivan Margary system of cataloguing possible Roman roads. Margary divided Roman roads into three categories: Main Routes are given single-digit numbers, Principal Branches two-digit numbers and Minor Branches three digit numbers. The RR156 began at Chichester and terminated at "Streetend" in Sidlesham. The road originally stretched the 4 miles (6.4 km) between its beginning and terminus. There is little evidence of it today but the original route is described in an Anglo-Saxon charter, dating from AD 903. (Note: S.403 A.D. 930 King Athelstan to Beornheah, bishop (of Selsey); grant of 4 hides (cassatae) at Medmerry, with woodland at Earnley and meadow outside Chichester, Sussex.)

Firstly at the hedge, south along Stane Street to Kingsham, thence south-west along the road to the hedge outside the little stony ford, due south to the head of the eastern stream, so west along the stream to Stockbridge, so north along the Fore Street to the southgate.

— AS Charter S.403, Barker 1948, p. 143

The charter suggests that the route ran from the south of the city to the west side of Kingsham Farm. Then beyond the Chichester Canal, before passing a little to the east of Streetend Farm.

== Other Roman roads in the area ==
In the Chichester area there were three roads to neighbouring urban centres, plus other routes that provided convenient cross-country links. These included the RR421 Chichester-Bitterne Road; the RR153 Chichester-Brighton road; and the RR15 Chichester-London (Stane Street).

Locally there is some evidence that there was a road (Note: For example there are two "Street fields" near West Wittering. Also there are settlements locally that contain the Old English hām. Studies have indicated that settlements containing the element hām are situated close to Roman roads. Local examples include Bracklesham, Cakeham, Sidlesham etc.) from the west of Sidlesham, that went across the peninsula from Birdham near, what is now, the Chichester Canal to the open coast at Bracklesham. It is also likely that the Chichester to Sidlesham Way extended to the Roman settlement at Selsey Bill, however the evidence for this is largely circumstantial.

== Sources ==
- Barker, Eric E. (1948). Salzman, L.F. (ed.). "Sussex Anglo-Saxon Charters". Sussex Archaeological Collections. 87. Sussex Archaeological Society. doi:10.5284/1086135.
- Bishop, M. C. (2014). The Secret History of the Roman Roads of Britain and their Impact on Military History. Barnsley: Pen and Sword. ISBN 9781473837256.
- Cunliffe, Barry (1973). The Regni. London: Duckworth. ISBN 0-7156-0669-7.
- Dodgson, John McN. (1973). "Place-Names from 'Hām', Distinguished from 'Hamm' Names, in Relation to the Settlement of Kent, Surrey and Sussex". Anglo-Saxon England. 2: 1–50. JSTOR 44510615.
- Margary, Ivan D (1955). Roman Roads in Britain. Vol. I. London: Phoenix House. OCLC 316495651.
- Moore, Helen (2002), East Beach Pond, Selsey, West Sussex An Archaeological Watching Brief for J.A. Pye Ltd (PDF), Report 02/91, Reading: Thames Valley Archaeological Services Ltd, archived from the original (PDF) on 2 October 2023
- Salzman, L.F., ed. (1953), "Sidlesham: The Rape of Chichester", A History of the County of Sussex, Victoria County History, vol. 4, London: British History Online, pp. 210–215

== See also ==
- Roman Britain
- Roman roads in Britain
