= Hardham =

Village and parish in West Sussex, England

Coordinates: 50.949°N 0.523°W

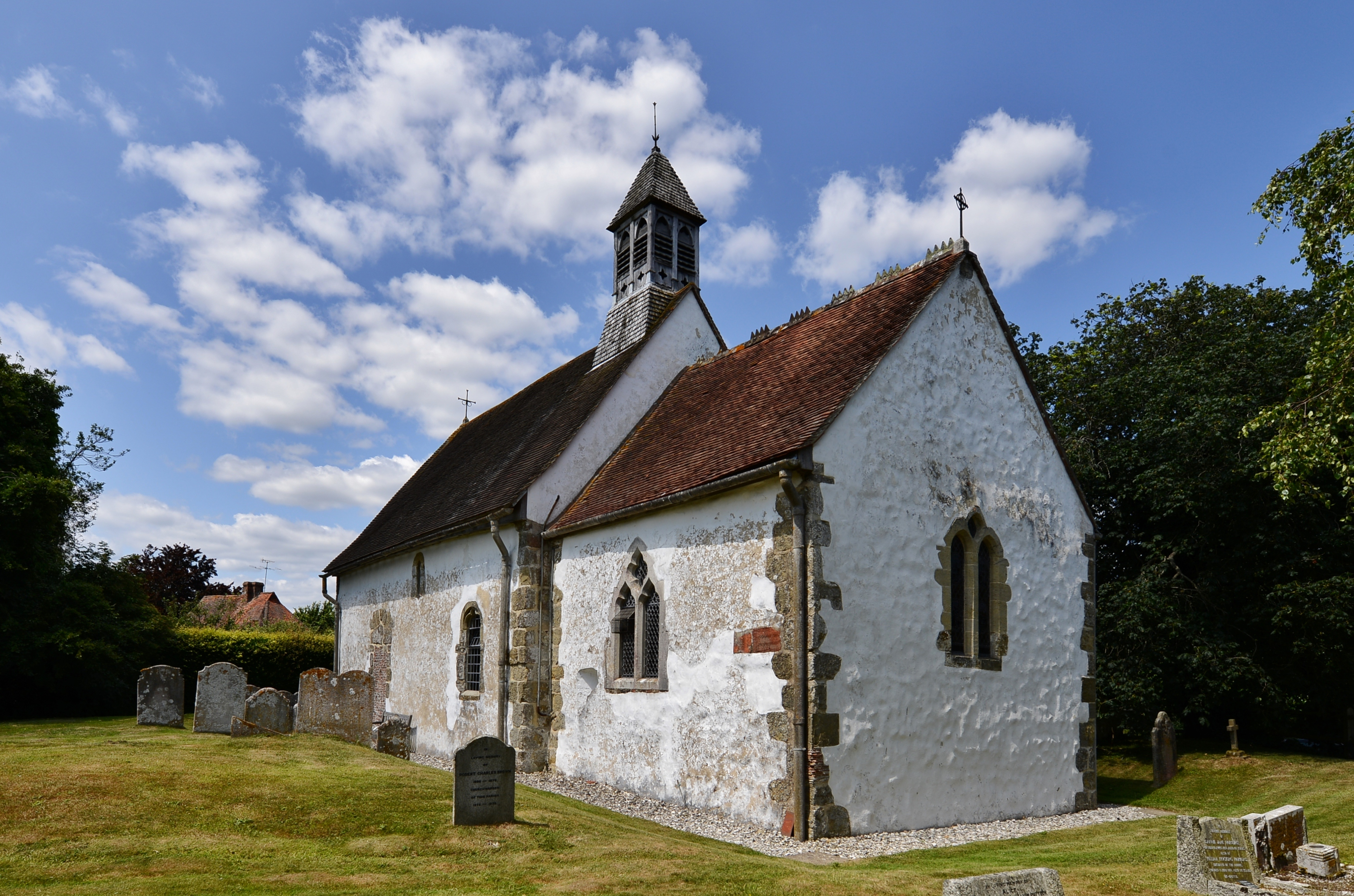
- St Botolph's Church

- Location within West Sussex
- OS grid reference: TQ038176
- Civil parish: Coldwaltham
- District: Horsham
- Shire county: West Sussex
- Region: South East
- Country: England
- Sovereign state: United Kingdom
- Post town: Pulborough
- Postcode district: RH20 1
- Police: Sussex
- Fire: West Sussex
- Ambulance: South East Coast
- UK Parliament: Arundel and South Downs

Hardham is a small village and former civil parish, now in the parish of Coldwaltham, in the Horsham district of West Sussex, England. It is on the A29 road 1.2 miles (2 km) southwest of Pulborough. In 1931 the parish had a population of 107.

== Archaeology ==
The village is on the line of Stane Street Roman road, which changes direction here, leaving the modern A29 road which has followed it from Capel, to head southwest to Bignor and Chichester. The Sussex Greensand Way from Lewes joined Stane Street here and remains of a Roman way station or mansio have been found.

== Parish church ==
The Church of England parish church of St Botolph has some of the oldest surviving wall paintings in the country, including an image of Saint George at the Siege of Antioch in AD 1097.

The paintings date from the early 12th century. They survived due to being covered by plaster until uncovered in 1866.

The painters used colours made from locally available materials — red and yellow ochre, lime white, carbon black, and a green from copper carbonate.

The paintings are in two tiers on each wall and originally had inscriptions describing the scenes above them. One of these can still be seen on the east wall of the nave.

The themes of the paintings are Adam and Eve, the life of Christ, the Last Judgment and Apocalypse, and the Labours of the Months.

== Economic and social history ==
On higher ground on the south side of the village are the remains of Hardham Priory, the Priory of St Cross, which was an Augustinian monastery established in the middle of the 13th century.

In the late 18th century a canal tunnel was built on the Arun Navigation to avoid a large loop of the River Arun. The railway line from Pulborough to Midhurst passed over the tunnel, and when the canal closed the railway company broke into the tunnel and filled that part of it under the rails with chalk. On 18 October 2019 the tunnel was Grade II listed.

On 1 April 1933 the parish was abolished and merged with Coldwaltham.
