= Sussex Greensand Way =

Roman road in England

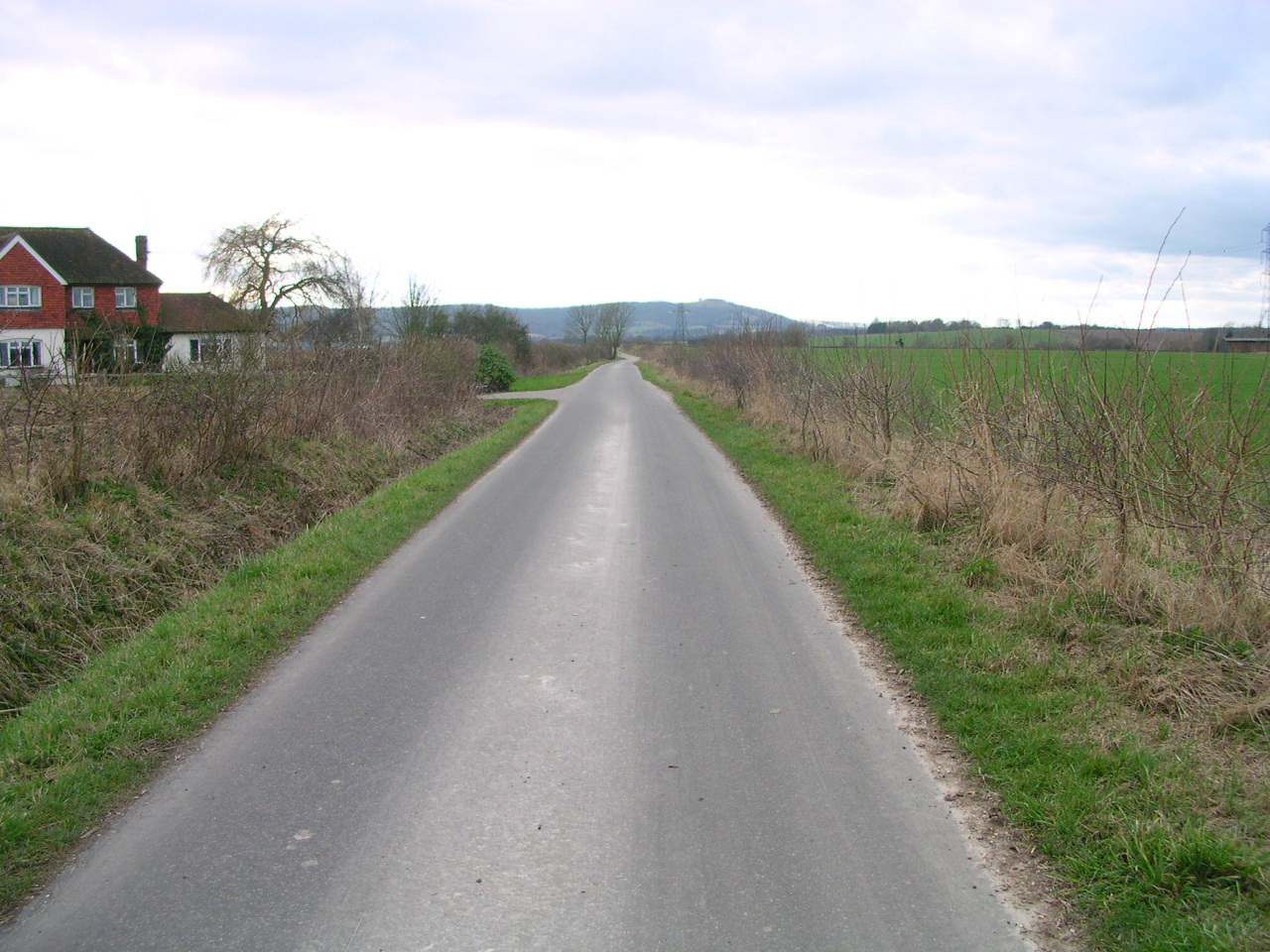
A track on the road line approaching the River Adur at Stretham

The Sussex Greensand Way is a Roman road that runs east-west linking the London to Lewes Way at Barcombe Mills to Stane Street at Hardham. The road, which has almost entirely fallen out of use, follows the free draining ridge of greensand which lies north of the South Downs. It is a planned route rather than a Romanised Iron Age track, following a few straight alignments without any steep gradients, which linked various north-south roads and tracks. A number of important Roman villas and their farming estates were linked by the road. It is not known at what time during the Roman period the road was built.

== The route ==
Branching from the London to Eastbourne area Roman road at Barcombe Mills, north of Lewes (50.9191°N 0.0022°W), the road runs west through East Chiltington then passes the south side of Plumpton Racecourse (where the agger runs beside the tarmac entrance road for some 200 m) then on to Streat, a Saxon placename indicative of a Roman road. Passing north of Ditchling and through Keymer it crosses the London to Brighton Way Roman road at Hassocks, where there was a Roman cemetery. West of Hassocks the road turns a little to the south, passing through Bedlam Street south of Hurstpierpoint where it briefly runs on a prominent agger alongside and then crosses the B2117, and continues past Woodmancote to Woods Mill, with short sections under or adjacent to the Woods Mill to Woodmancote road. The road then runs across the River Adur floodplain, where the Adur was bridged on wooden piles close to Stretham Manor. From the river the road runs west to the moated Buncton Manor Farm where it turns north west to West Chiltington and crosses the River Arun floodplain to join Stane Street at Hardham (50.9463°N 0.5362°W). Remains of a Roman bath house have been found east of the junction and there was a posting station or Mansio on Stane Street at Hardham.

== Purposes of the road ==
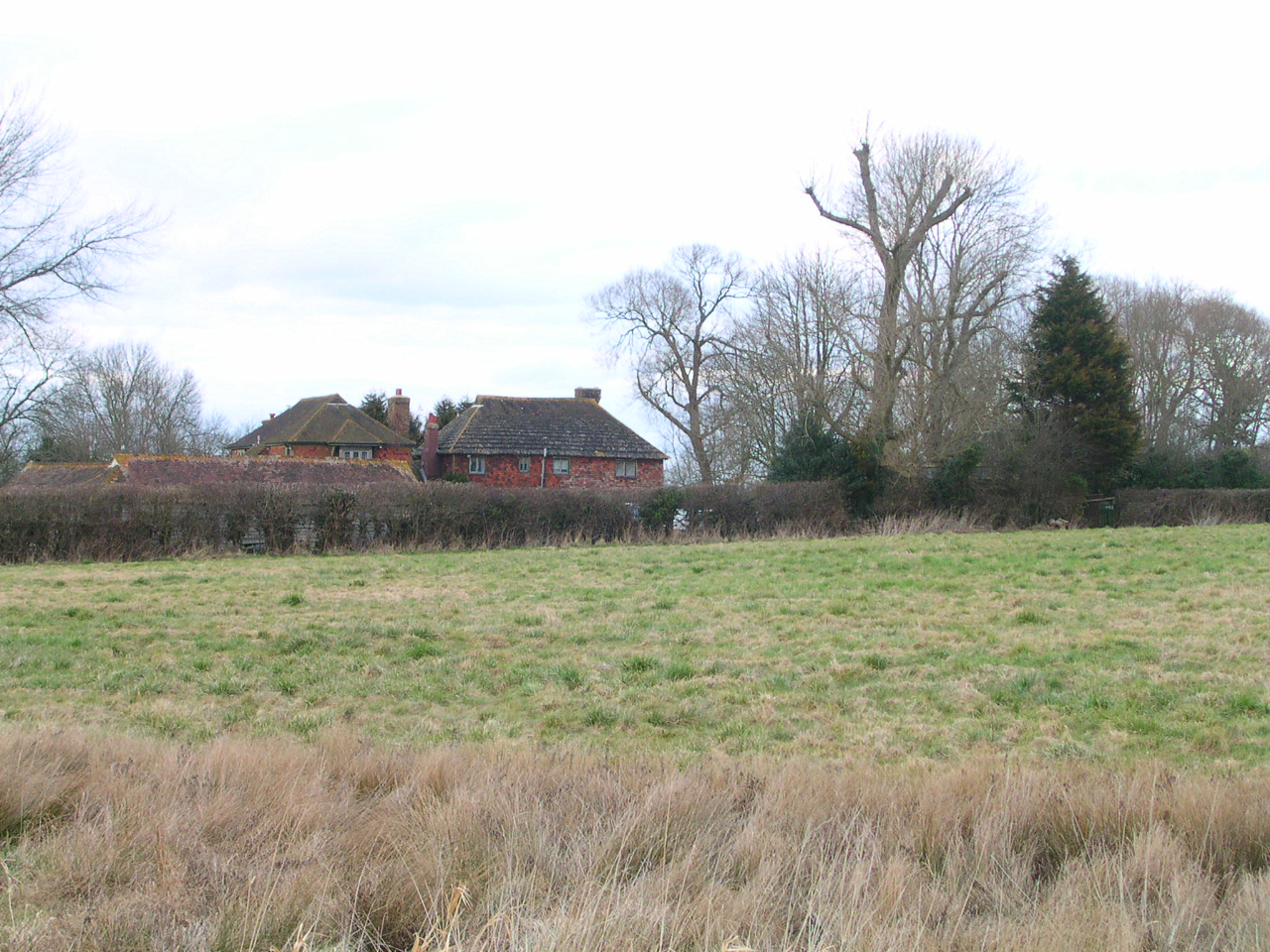
Stretham Manor by the River Adur takes its name from the road

The road linked numerous villa estates along the greensand ridge and joined various north-south routes. There was a Roman temple at Chanctonbury Ring and a large cemetery has been found near a crossroads at Hassocks. The road is unlikely to have had any military importance in the early Roman period when the empire was at the zenith of its power and the Sussex area was a friendly client kingdom, but as Saxon and Jute raiding became a problem along the coasts the inland route may have become a safer alternative to the coastal roads. In the aftermath of Roman rule it took some fourteen years for Saxon settlers in the Chichester area to overcome Romano-British resistance based on the fortress of Anderitum at Pevensey. The road may have had military importance during this time.

== Construction ==
Sections made through some better-preserved parts of the road show it to have been of light construction with about 3 inches (76 mm) of metalling, usually on a low agger, but in drier places laid direct on the natural subsoil. The width of metalling varies from 25 feet (7.6 m) at the wider points, on an agger about 40 feet (12 m) wide, down to 9 feet (2.7 m) on terraceways crossing hillsides. The metalling on this road has been found to be flint at all the points studied, with a camber of about 8 inches (200 mm). Well preserved examples of the agger occur along the south side of Plumpton Racecourse and adjoining the B2117 road south of Hurstpierpoint.

== See also ==
- Roman Britain
- Roman roads in Britain
