= Slinfold =

Village and parish in West Sussex, England

Coordinates: 51.070°N 0.405°W

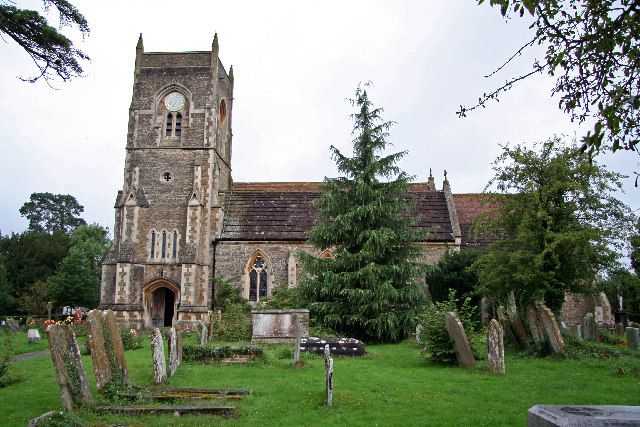
- St. Peter's parish church

- Location within West Sussex
- Area: 16.95 km^{2} (6.54 sq mi)
- Population: 1,647 (2001 census); 2,055 (2011 Census)
  - Density: 97/km^{2} (250/sq mi)
- OS grid reference: TQ1131
  - London: 45 miles (72 km) NNE
- Civil parish: Slinfold
- District: Horsham
- Shire county: West Sussex
- Region: South East
- Country: England
- Sovereign state: United Kingdom
- Post town: Horsham
- Postcode district: RH13
- Dialling code: 01403
- Police: Sussex
- Fire: West Sussex
- Ambulance: South East Coast
- UK Parliament: Horsham
- Website: Slinfold Parish Council

Slinfold is a village and civil parish in the Horsham District of West Sussex, England.

== Geography ==
The village is almost 4 miles (6.4 km) west of Horsham, just off the A29 road.

The parish covers 4,186 acres (1,694 ha). The 2001 Census recorded a population of 1,647 people living in 627 households of whom 780 were economically active.

Slinfold is the source of the western River Adur, which flows to the English Channel at Shoreham-by-Sea

== History ==
=== Roman remains ===
Alfodean was excavated by archaeological television programme Time Team in 2006, the site of one of a probable four mansiones on the route of Stane Street between London and Chichester.

=== Manors ===
There has been a house at Dedisham, 1 mile (1.6 km) northeast of the village, since at least 1271, when Henry III granted the then occupier a licence to crenellate the manor house then on the site. The present house on the site appears to date from the 16th or 17th century. During the English Civil War the Parliamentarian commander Sir William Waller sacked a house on this site in 1643.

Slinfold Manor, 1.5 miles (2.4 km) south of the village, is a Georgian house built late in the 18th century.

== Economic and social history ==
Slinfold railway station on the Cranleigh Line was opened in 1865 and closed in 1965. The trackbed of the line now forms part of the Downs Link Bridleway. The route of the former Roman road linking London and Chichester passes through the parish and a Roman posting station existed at Alfoldean. In 1848 it was recorded that Roman swords and brass ornaments had been found in the parish.

Slinfold has a village shop and Post Office, a primary school and pre-school, a recreation ground, a village hall and one public house, the Red Lyon. Where Slinfold Railway station used to be is now a Caravan Club site.

== Church and chapel ==
The Church of England parish church of Saint Peter was designed by the Gothic Revival architect Benjamin Ferrey in a late 13th-century style and built in 1861 on the site of the original medieval parish church.

Slinfold Chapel is linked with Horsham United Reformed Church.

== Bell legend ==
It is said that there is a boggy hollow near Slinfold which contains a sunken bell. Long ago, some villagers, hoping to retrieve the bell, sought the advice of a witch. She told them that it could only be retrieved by 12 white oxen, at midnight. The oxen were used, but one villager broke the witch's instructions by speaking, and the bell sank back into the bog.

== Sport ==
The village is home to an 18-hole golf course, the Slinfold Cricket club who play in the Sussex Cricket League, and Slinfold FC, who play in the West Sussex Football League. It is also the home of the LMGT3 class FIA World Endurance Championship team TF Sport.

== Sources ==
- Lewis, Samuel, ed. (1931) [1848]. A Topographical Dictionary of England (Seventh ed.). London: Samuel Lewis. pp. 120–123.
- Nairn, Ian; Pevsner, Nikolaus (1965). Sussex. The Buildings of England. Harmondsworth: Penguin Books. pp. 328–329. ISBN 0-14-071028-0.
