= S. E. Winbolt =

British author and archaeologist (1868–1944)

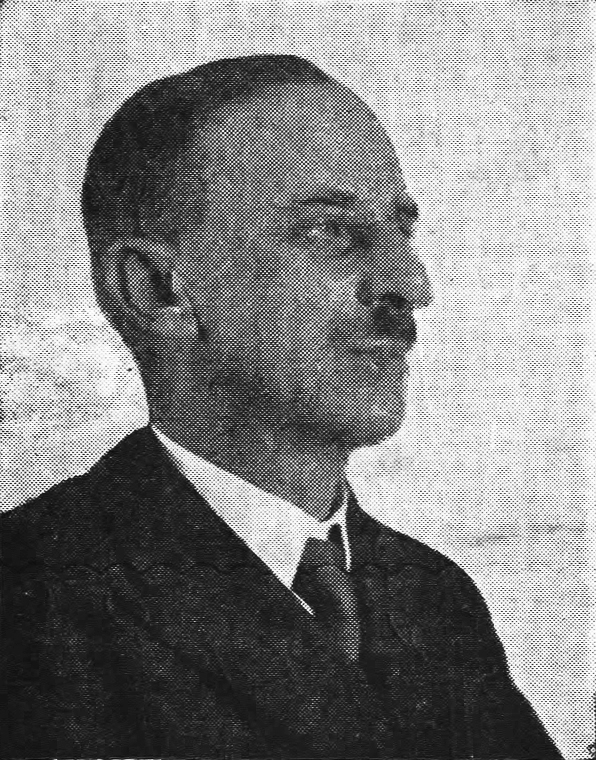
S E Winbolt

Samuel Edward Winbolt (1868–1944) was a British schoolmaster, classicist, author, antiquary and field archaeologist whose career bridged the worlds of late-Victorian classical education and the rapidly developing archaeology of inter-war Britain. Although archaeology was not his original profession, it became the work for which he was best known in later life, particularly through his excavations of Roman sites in southern England and his investigation of Roman roads.

He was educated at Christ's Hospital and Corpus Christi College, Oxford, where he subsequently returned as a master in classics and history. Whilst there he published some educational editions of the classics and other works on history and English literature. His classical training naturally turned his attention to Roman history and archaeology, which led him to spend much time in British and continental museums, and on which he gave BBC talks.

He began practical archaeological excavations in 1922 and went on to unearth four Roman villas, a Romano-Celtic Temple on Farley Heath, Surrey and two Roman posting stations, made countless sections of Roman roads and found and dug a score of medieval glasshouse sites. Added to this he investigated six Early Iron Age camps in Sussex, Surrey and Kent. He also wrote four titles in the Penguin Guides series, which provided post-war touring guides to the English counties.

== Bibliography ==
Title	Publisher	Publication Date	Notes
English Poetry for the Young	Blackie and Son	1904	
The Latin Hexameter: Hints for Sixth Forms	Blackie and Son	1906	
The Virgil Pocket Book	Archibald Constable and Company	1907	Arranged by S. E. Winbolt
England and Napoleon (1801-1815)	G. Bell & Sons	1912	
American independence and the French Revolution (1760-1801)	G. Bell & Sons	1912	
Spenser & Shelley & their Poetry	George G. Harrap & Company	1912	
Dialogues of Roman Life	G. Bell & Sons	1913	Text on Wikisource
The Horace Pocket Book	G. Bell & Sons	1914	Arranged by S. E. Winbolt
Spenser & his Poetry	George G. Harrap & Company	1918	
The Poetry And Prose Of Coleridge Lamb And Leigh Hunt	W J Bryce	1920	Edited by S. E. Winbolt
Poems By Alfred Lord Tennyson	G. Bell & Sons	1923	Edited by S. E. Winbolt
Roman Folkestone	Methuen & Co	1925	
Excavation at Farley Heath, Albury, 1926	Surrey Archaeological Collections	1926	https://archive.org/details/p2surreyarchaeol37surr/page/180/mode/2up
A Survey of English Grammar	Blackie and Son		
Bell's Pocket Guide to Somerset	G. Bell & Sons	1929	
Bell's Pocket Guide to Devon	G. Bell & Sons	1929	
Bell's Pocket Guide to Kent	G. Bell & Sons	1930	
Bell's Pocket guide to The Chilterns and the Thames Valley (from Iffley to Staines)	G. Bell & Sons	1932	
Dry Hill Camp, Lingfield	Surrey Archaeological Collections	1933	Pamphlet co-written with I. D. Margary
Wealden Glass. The Surrey-Sussex Glass Industry (A.D. 1226–1615)	Combridges, Hove	1933	
With A Spade On Stane Street	Methuen	1936	
Britain B.C.	Penguin	1943	
Britain under the Romans	Penguin	1945	
Penguin Guides - Kent, Sussex & Surrey	Penguin	1939	
Penguin Guides - Somerset	Penguin	1939	
Penguin Guides - Hampshire and the Isle of Wight	Penguin	1949	
Penguin Guides - Herts and Bucks	Penguin	1949	
The Roman Villa at Bignor, Sussex: With a Plan of the Villa	Tallyer Ltd	1963	Co-written with George Herbert Moore
The Parish Church of St. Mary the Virgin Horsham	Sussex Church Publishers	1968	Pamphlet
