= Bignor =

Village and parish in West Sussex, England

Coordinates: 50.92293°N 0.6013°W

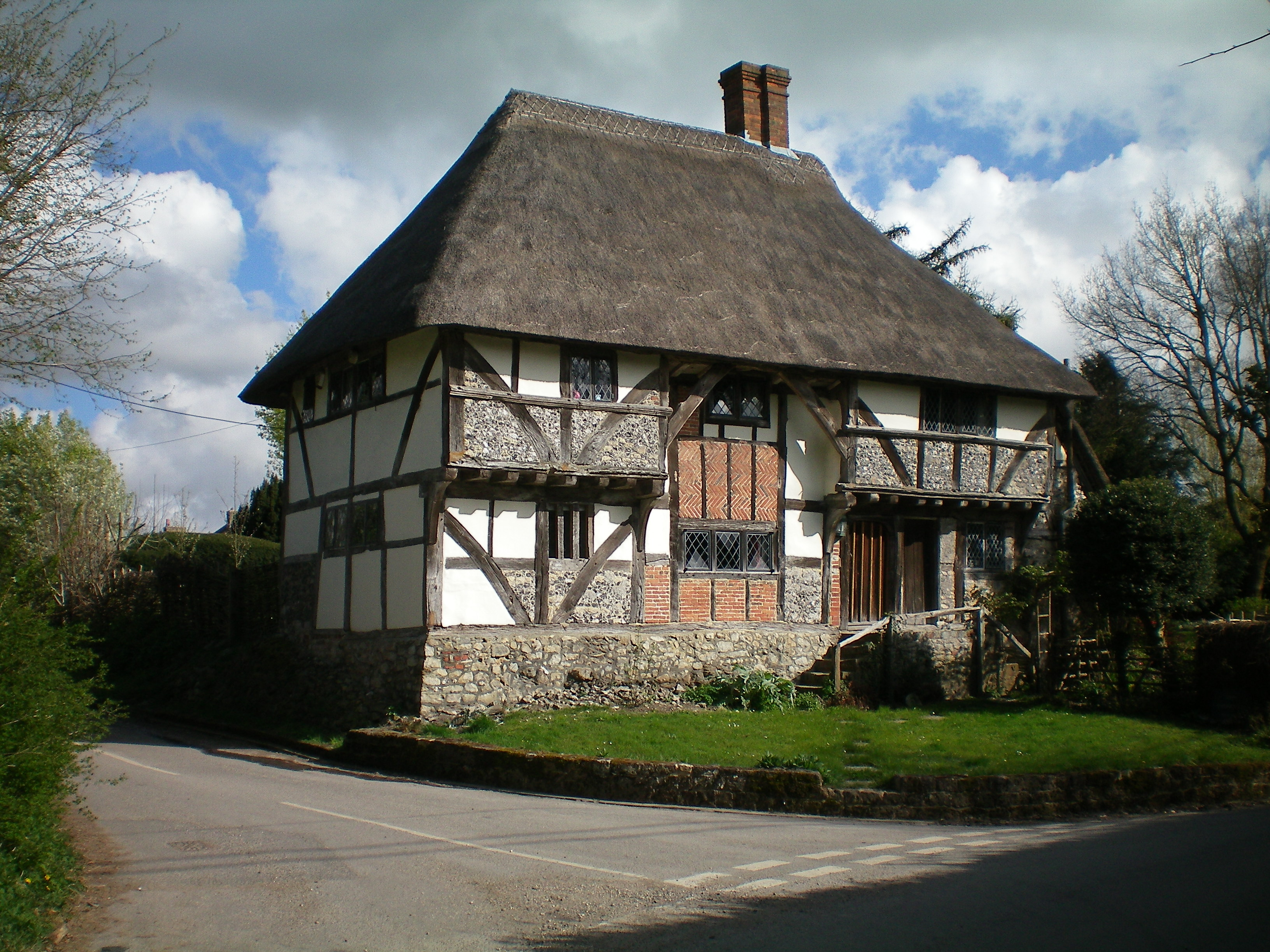
- The Yeoman's House

- Location within West Sussex
- Area: 4.71 km^{2} (1.82 sq mi)
- Population: 103 2001 Census
  - Density: 22/km^{2} (57/sq mi)
- OS grid reference: SU984146
  - London: 43 miles (69 km) NNE
- Civil parish: Bignor
- District: Chichester
- Shire county: West Sussex
- Region: South East
- Country: England
- Sovereign state: United Kingdom
- Post town: PULBOROUGH
- Postcode district: RH20
- Dialling code: 01798
- Police: Sussex
- Fire: West Sussex
- Ambulance: South East Coast
- UK Parliament: Arundel and South Downs

Bignor is a village and civil parish in the Chichester district of the English county of West Sussex, about six miles (9.7 km) north of Arundel. It is in the civil parish of Pulborough.

The nearest railway station is 3.3 miles (5.3 km) south east of the village, at Amberley. The area of the parish is 471 hectares (1,160 acres). According to the 2001 census Bignor had a population of 103 people living in 43 households.

The village is next to the line of Stane Street, an important Roman road, where it ascends the escarpment of the South Downs. The modern track from the village to the hill top climbs steeply up to and then roughly follows the Roman route, but before the car park at the top Stane Street can be seen as a wide flat terraceway below the modern track.

== Landmarks ==
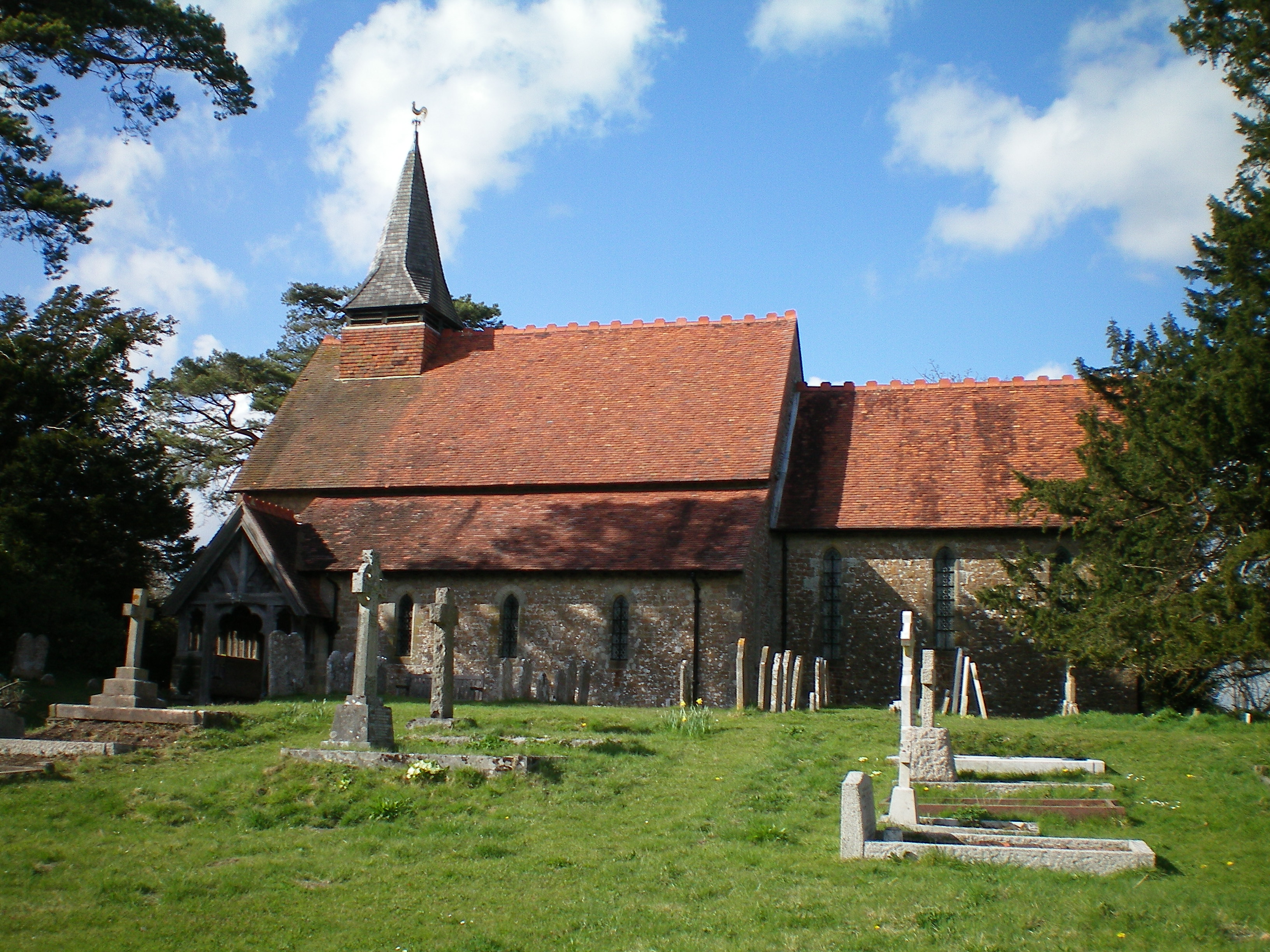
Church of the Holy Cross

The Anglican parish church of the Holy Cross is a largely 13th century structure, but it is mentioned in the Domesday Book with the chancel arch and font surviving from the 11th century. It is one of a benefice of five downland churches (Barlavington, Bignor, Burton, Coates and Sutton).

Historic houses in the village include the Yeoman's House, a ca. 15th century oak-framed hall house of the "wealden" type. Formerly known as the Old Shop the house has a recessed centre section with curved brackets supporting the eaves, while the first floor of the wings projects. There is some brick infill in the centre section with the rest of the walls having a mix of plaster and flint infill.

=== Roman villa ===
Within the parish are the excavations of a large Roman villa which has been open to the public since 1814. The villa contains some of the finest and best preserved Roman mosaics in England.

=== Bignor Manor House ===
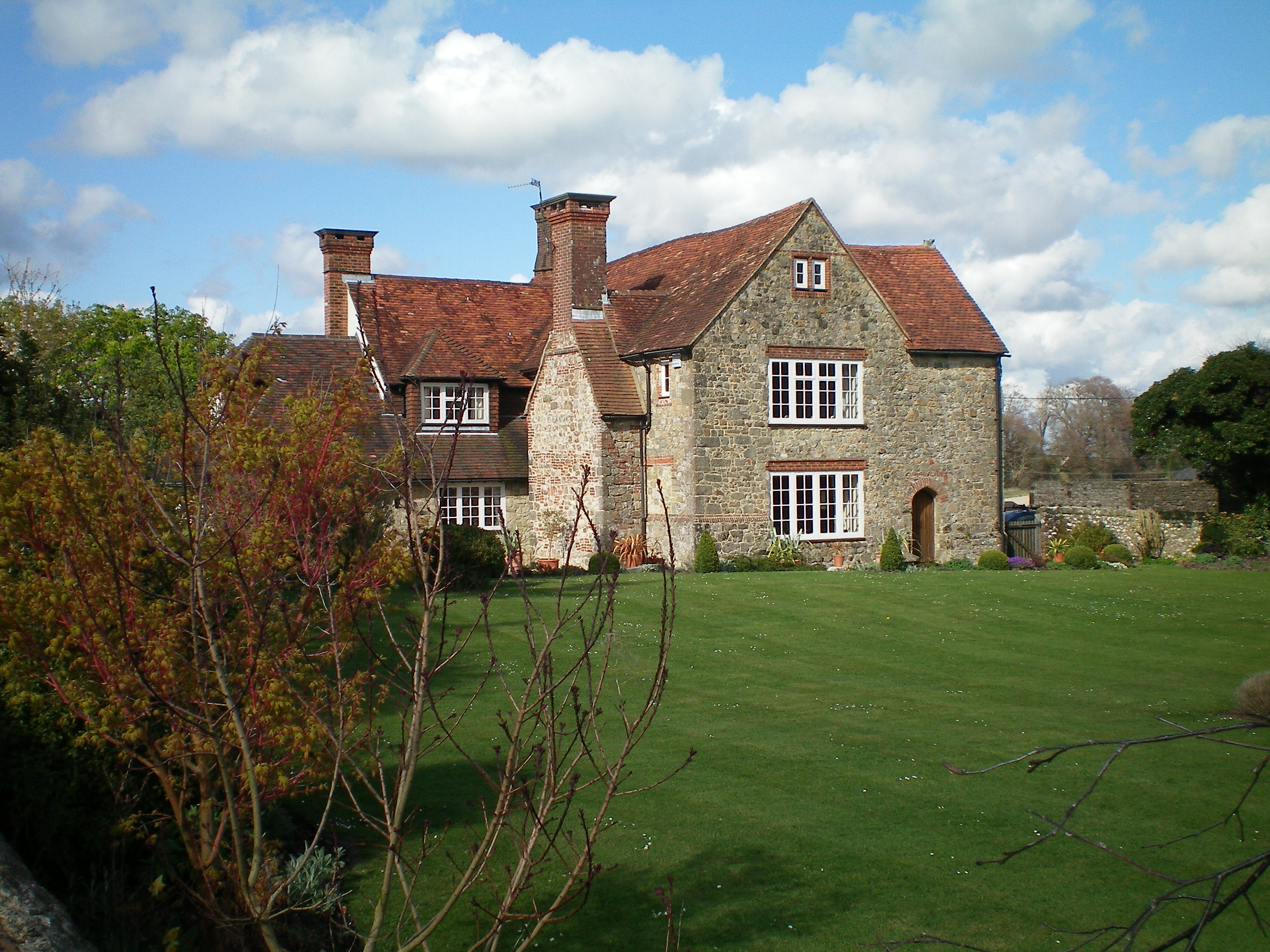
The Manor House

During World War II, Bignor Manor House was the rented family home of Major Anthony Bertram who was working for military intelligence with French resistance agents. He volunteered to use the manor house as a secret forward base for members of the resistance who were waiting to be flown by light aircraft to France on moonlit nights from RAF Tangmere air base.

His wife Barbara looked after the agents and carried out final checks on clothing and equipment to ensure that everything they had was consistent with being French. Agents returning from France would also be taken there for food, rest and initial debriefing.
