= Margary numbers =

Scheme to identify Roman roads in Britain

Margary numbers are the numbering scheme developed by the historian Ivan Margary to catalogue known and suspected Roman roads in Britain in his 1955 work The Roman Roads of Britain. They remain the standard system used by archaeologists and historians to identify individual Roman roads within Britain. It is not known how the Romans identified the roads they built within Britain, and well-known names such as Watling Street and the Fosse Way largely date from the Anglo-Saxon period, are sometimes ambiguous or duplicated, and cover only a small proportion of the known network.

Margary's numbering system follows similar conventions to modern road numbering systems. He divided roads into three categories: Main Routes are given single-digit numbers, Principal Branches two-digit numbers and Minor Branches three digit numbers. Individual sections of longer routes are identified by adding letters to the route number, for example Dere Street (Margary 8) is divided into sections 8a, 8b, 8c, 8d and 8e. Double letters are sometimes used to indicate parallel or alternative routes. Lesser roads in particular areas are given similar numbers – for example many roads in Wales have numbers in the 60s.

Margary's cataloguing system has been criticised as being essentially arbitrary in several respects. Margary's hierarchy of routes is not necessarily that of the original designers or users of the network. Evidence for whether the Romans considered different lengths of road to form parts of a single route can be ambiguous, so the fact that they are given a single Margary number can be misleading. Margary's network also largely consists of roads built by the Romans, not necessarily roads used by the Romans, who may have continued to use native British trackways.

Margary's system is nonetheless widely used for its practicality, and the awarding of a Margary number to a route came to be considered a hallmark of authenticity among researchers in the field.

== Main routes and principal branches ==
Margary number	Traditional name	Route
1	Watling Street	Dover – (1a) – Canterbury – (1b) – Rochester – (1c) – London – (1d) – St. Albans – (1e) – Towcester – (1f) – High Cross – (1g) – Wall – (1h) – Wroxeter
2	Ermine Street	London – (2a) – Braughing – (2b) – Chesterton – (2c) – Lincoln – (2d) – Brough – (2e) – York
3	Great Road/Pye Road	London – (3a) – Chelmsford – (3b) – Colchester – (3c) – Baylham – (3d) – Caistor St Edmund
4	Port Way	London – (4a) – Silchester – (4b) – Old Sarum – (4c) – Badbury Rings – (4d) – Dorchester – (4e) – Poole Harbour – (4f) – Exeter
5	Fosse Way	Axmouth – (5a) – Ilchester – (5b) – Bath – (5c) – Cirencester – (5d) – High Cross – (5e) – Leicester – (5f) – Lincoln
6	Watling Street (West)	Chester – (6a) – Wroxeter – (6b) – Leintwardine – (6c) – Monmouth – (6d) – Chepstow
7		Chester – (7a) – Manchester – (7b) – Ribchester – (7c) – Low Barrow Bridge – (7d) – Brougham – (7e) – Carlisle – (7f) – Crawford – (7g) – Cramond
8	Dere Street	York – (8a) – Aldborough – (8b) – Catterick Bridge – (8c) – Binchester – (8d) – Corbridge – (8e) – High Rochester – (8f) – Newstead – (8g) – Dalkeith
9		Camelon – (9a) – Strageath – (9b) – Kirriemuir
10		Canterbury – Richborough
11		Canterbury – Upstreet
12	Stone Street	Canterbury – Lympne
13		Rochester – Hastings
14		London – Lewes
15	Stane Street	London – Chichester
16	Akeman Street	St. Albans – (16a) – Alchester – (16b) – Cirencester
17		Norton – Duston
18	Ryknild Street	Bourton-on-the-Water – (18a) – Alcester – (18b) – Wall – (18c) – Little Chester – (18d) – Chesterfield – (18e) – Rotherham
19		Stretton – Whitchurch
21		St. Albans – (21a) – Braughing – (21b) – Worsted Lodge
22		Braughing – Godmanchester
23	Akeman Street	Arrington – (23a) – Cambridge – (23b) – Littleport
24	Via Devana	Godmanchester – Sible Hedingham
25	The Fen Road	Upton – Denver, Norfolk
26	King Street	Ailsworth – Ancaster
27		Lincoln – Burgh-le-Marsh
28		Lincoln – (28a) – Doncaster – (28b) – Tadcaster – (28c) – York
29		South Newbould – Malton
30		Clapton – Great Dunmow
31		Bradwell on Sea
32	Stane Street	Braughing – Colchester
33	Peddars Way	Chelmsford – (33a) – Ixworth – (33b) – Holme next the Sea
34		Wixoe – (34a) – Baylham – (34b) – Peasenhall
35		Pulham St. Mary – Peasenhall
36	Stone Street	Halesworth – Woodton
37		Bunwell – Thetford
38		Halesworth – Woodton
39		Toftrees – Holkham
41	Ermin Way	Silchester – (41a) – Speen – (41b) – Cirencester – (41c) – Gloucester
42		Silchester – (42a) – Winchester – (42b) – Bitterne
43		Winchester – Wanborough
44		Old Sarum – Mildenhall
45		Winchester – (45a) – Old Sarum – (45b) – Charterhouse
46		Badbury Rings – Kingston Deverall
47		Dorchester – Ilchester
48		Dorchester – Weymouth
49		Charmouth – Exeter
51		Ilchester – Puriton
52		Bath – Frome
53		Speen – Bath
54		Bath – Sea Mills
55	White Way	Cirencester – Hailes
56		Finmere – (56a) – Eatington – (56b) – Droitwich
57		Huntingdon – (57a) – Leicester – (57b) – Mancetter
58		Six Hills – (58a) – Grantham – (58b) – Donington
60		Newnham – (60a) – Caerleon – (60b) – Cardiff – (60c) – Neath – (60d) – Carmarthen
61		Gloucester – Mitcheldean
62	Sarn Helen (East)	Caerleon – (62a) – Brecon – (62b) – Llandovery – (62c) – Llanfair Clydogau
63		Stretton Grandison – (63a) – Kenchester – (63b) – Brecon
64		Wroxeter – Trefeglwys
66		Chester – (66a) – Caer Gai – (66b) – Dolgellau
67		Chester – (67a) – St. Asaph – (67b) – Caerhun – (67c) – Caernarfon
68		Caernarfon – Caer Gai
69	Sarn Helen	Caerhun – (69a) – Tomen y Mur – (69b) – Pennal – (69c) – Llanio – (69d) – Carmarthen
70	King Street	Sandbach – (70a) – Warrington – (70b) – Wigan – (70c) – Preston – (70d) – Lancaster
71	The Street	Little Chester – (71a) – Buxton – (71b) – Manchester
72		Ribchester – (72a) – Ilkley – (72b) – Tadcaster
73		Ingleton – Brough by Bainbridge
74	High Street	Brougham – Troutbeck
75		Carlisle – Egremont
76		Lockerbie – Lochmaben
77	Well Path	Crawford – Dalswinton
78		Roberton – (78a) – Castledykes – (78b) – Glasgow
79		Peebles – (79a) – Castledykes – (79b) – Loudoun Hill
80		Barmby – (80a) – Durham – (80b) – Newcastle upon Tyne
81	Wade's Causeway	York – (81a) – Malton – (81b) – Whitby
82		Scotch Corner – Brougham
83		Willington – Durham
84	Maiden Way	Kirkby Thore – Carvoran
85	Stanegate	Corbridge – (85a) – Carvoran – (85b) – Carlisle
86	Military Way (Hadrian's Wall)	Wallsend – (86a) – Portgate – (86b) – Carvoran – (86c) – Carlisle – (86d) – Bowness-on-Solway
87	Devil's Causeway	Portgate – Tweedmouth
88		High Rochester – Whittingam
89		Lockerbie – Newstead
90	Military Way (Antonine Wall)	Bridgeness – Old Kilpatrick

== Bibliography ==
- Bagshawe, Richard W. (1979). Roman Roads. Oxford: Shire Publications. ISBN 9780852634585.
- Bishop, M. C. (2014). The Secret History of the Roman Roads of Britain and their Impact on Military History. Barnsley: Pen and Sword. ISBN 9781473837256.
- Davies, Hugh (2002). Roads in Roman Britain. Stroud: Tempus. ISBN 9780752425030.
- Davies, Hugh (2008). Roman Roads in Britain. Oxford: Shire Books. ISBN 9780747806905.
