= Ivan Margary =

British historian (1896–1976)

Receiving a trophy for his prize bull

Ivan Donald Margary, FSA (1896–1976) was a British historian who became the leading authority on Roman roads in Great Britain. He wrote numerous works on Roman roads of which his most influential and complete was Roman Roads In Britain.

== Biography ==
Ivan Donald Margary was born at 21 Kensington Palace Gardens, Knightsbridge, on 23 November 1896. In his youth he lived with his family in Bruton Street, just off Berkeley Square.

He was educated privately and then matriculated into Exeter College, Oxford in 1913 to study chemistry. From 1914 to 1919, he served in the 3rd Battalion Royal Sussex Regiment of the British Army during the First World War. Having been a member of the Officers Training Corps, he was commissioned as a second lieutenant on 8 April 1915. He was injured multiple times, including a broken ankle and being shot in the back and neck. He returned to Oxford after the war and graduated with a Bachelor of Arts (BA) degree in 1921.

Margary inherited £100,000 and property in the will of James Walker Larnach of Sydney, New South Wales, Australia published on 04 July 1924, which further enabled his philanthropy.

In 1932 Margary married Dorothy Marie Jolly (1893-1978) at Godstone, Surrey.

Margary's primary gift to the study of Roman roads was the development of a catalogue system known as Margary numbers, numbering Roman roads so that they could be referred to by catalogue number to avoid confusion, and to allow cross-referencing of the same road between different studies and authors.

In later life, he financed the excavation of Fishbourne Roman Palace, near Chichester in West Sussex, and the building of Margary Quad at Exeter, his old college. He contributed to the National Trust's excavation at Avebury Stone Circle and to the archaeology department of the British School at Rome. His other interests included meteorology and agriculture.

Ivan Donald Margary died at 'Yew Lodge', Felcourt on 18 February 1976. His will included many generous bequests to charitable organisations, including the Society of Antiquaries.

== Honours and awards ==
In 1932, Margary was elected Fellow of the Society of Antiquaries of London. He declined all other nominations for recognition.

== Selected works ==
- Roman Roads in Britain, Phoenix House, London. Vol. 1 (South, 1955) and Vol.2 (North, 1957)
