= Balcombe Place =

House in West Sussex, England

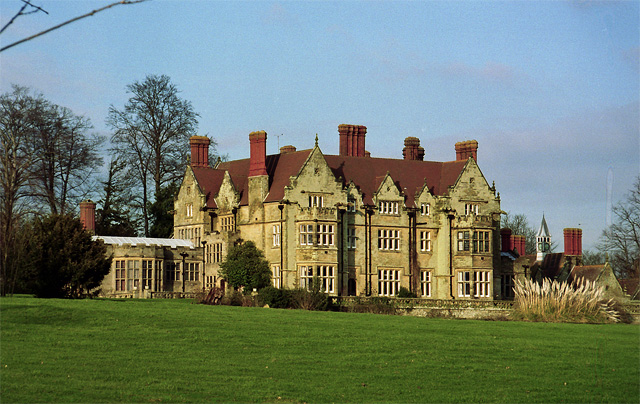
- Balcombe Place in 1999

- Location within West Sussex

General information
- Architectural style: Tudor Revival
- Location: Balcombe, West Sussex, England
- Coordinates: 51.04°N 0.11°W
- Year built: 1856

Design and construction
- Architect: Henry Clutton

Listed Building – Grade II*
- Official name: Balcombe Place
- Designated: 26 April 1977
- Reference no.: 1025775

Balcombe Place is a Grade II* listed building, built in 1856 in Balcombe, West Sussex, England, with a south view across the Ouse Valley. It now forms part of The Balcombe Estate.

The architect was Henry Clutton. It was built for John Alexander Hankey, whose family had been living at Naylands, a house about 1 mile away. The Gentleman's Magazine in 1864 refers to a meeting where "members adjourned to Balcombe Place, a residence recently erected by John Alexander Hankey, Esq., who hospitably entertained them".

The main living area was connected to the servants' areas, a rear courtyard and stables. A photograph in 1897 shows a tall, large glass and wood conservatory on the east side. By the 1960s, that structure had fallen into disrepair and had either been demolished on purpose, or had simply fallen down. Images in 2013 suggested it was overgrown, but still protected by walls on each side, and probably still growing plants from earlier plantings. Descriptions refer to the Denmans 'lawn tennis' courts, but their location is unclear. No courts are shown in the 1910 Ordnance Survey (OS) map, a (hard) court existed in the 1960s and appears in the 1974 OS map.

Early maps show wooded areas around the main building, but with a generally unobstructed view to the south. By the 1960s, some trees to the east and south had been removed. This may have occurred during the war years, or when the land was used as a school, but may have been arranged beforehand by Lady Denman, who recorded 'bonfires' as a hobby and was once described as 'indiscriminately lopping' trees.

== Early history ==
Balcombe parish lay within the original precincts of the Forest of Worth. In the reign of Edward I, William de Warenne held the area, and it probably descended as the Barony of Lewes and the Borde-Hill and Spelice families of Nayland. In 1860 the principal estate in the parish was Nayland (now Balcombe Place). Nayland passed respectively through the Michelborne, Culpeper (or Culpepper), Spence, Liddel (or Liddell), Clitherow and Chatfield families who sold it to J.A. Hankey, Esq., High Sheriff of Sussex in 1866. Hankey erected Balcombe Place in the Tudor style on a commanding spot, near the ancient house.

== 1899 additions ==
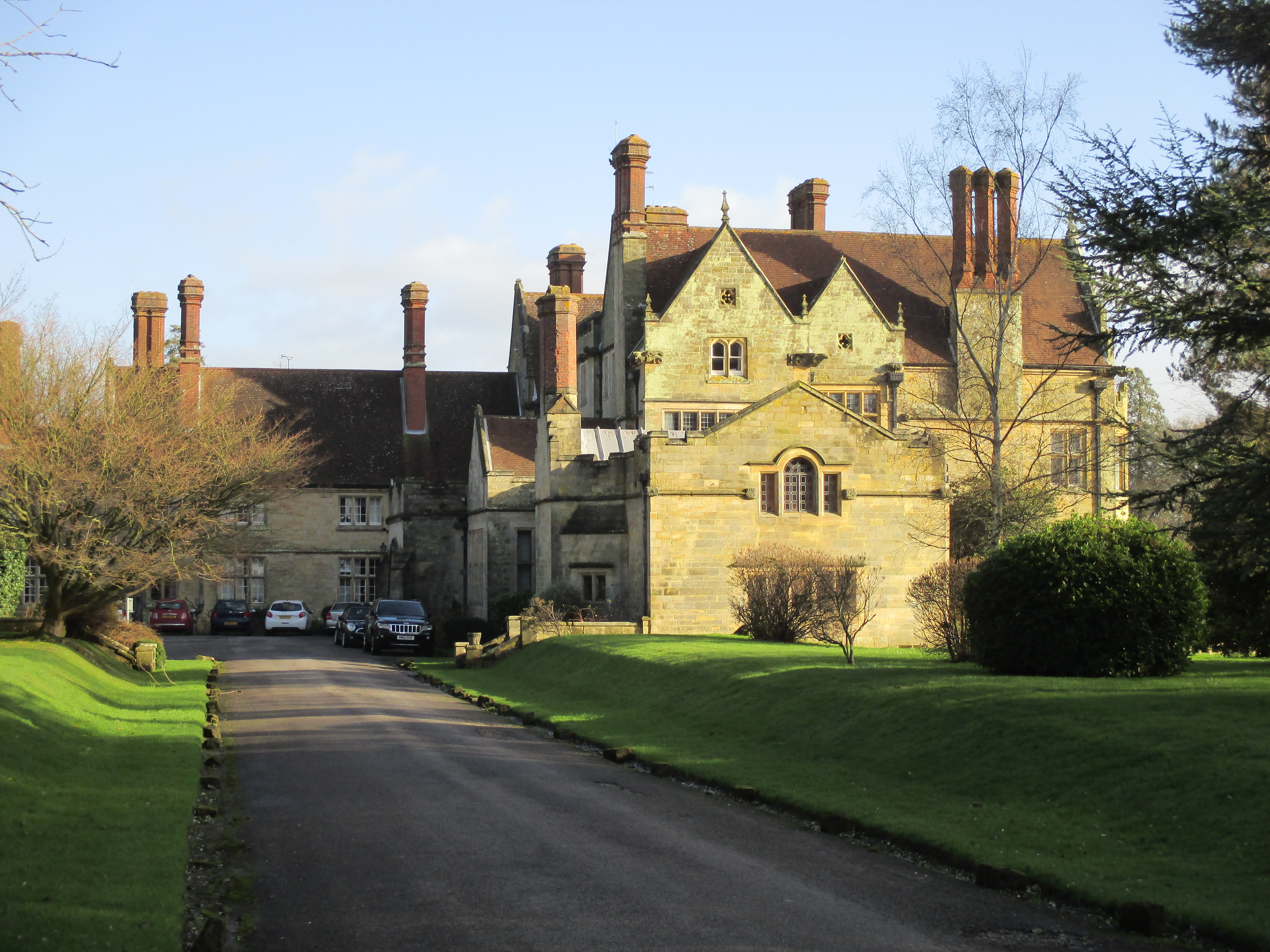
South-western aspect of the building.

In 1899 a music room (also described as a 'ballroom') was added to the building with designs by the architect G. C. Horsley. Reynaldo Hahn wrote that he completed "La Cimetiere de campagne" at Balcombe Place. The room integrated a large, electrically powered organ (with its motor in a small basement room); and with organ pipes and a small choir (or minstral's) gallery.

The work also included additions to the "garden front". The 1910 Ordnance Survey map shows the new 'Music Room', but also shows a pond in the front garden with a fountain. By 1955 the fountain was removed; and the remaining pond was used sometimes as a swimming pool, but is now filled in and contains plants. A ha-ha is added to separate fields of livestock from the domestic lands.

== Cowdray Estate ==
In 1905 it was purchased, along with the 3,000-acre (1,200 ha) Balcombe Estate by Weetman Pearson, 1st Viscount Cowdray for his daughter Gertrude upon her marriage to the 3rd Baron Denman. The couple went in Australia in 1911, but returned three years later due to Lord Denman's hay fever. "It was not an unusual thing for him to retire" to the cool cellars of the house, where "he would spend hours there reading". Lady Denman enjoyed golf and laid a course where the ninth hole was right up against the plate glass windows of the dining room so that her guests were never brave enough to hit the ball properly. In 1913 an electrically-operated water pump (300 gallons per minute) was installed.

During World War II, the building became the headquarters of the Women's Land Army. There are no known publicly viewable photographs of this huge operation. Personal accounts describe the influx of administrative workers, tables, desks and office supplies; and stables containing WLA uniforms and other distributable goods. The tennis courts became used for livestock.

In 1954 following the death of Lady Denman, the building was leased to a school on a 21-year lease. Ownership of the building and the estates remain within the family.

On 9 November 2015, the centenary of the first WI meeting in England, the Balcombe Place's entry in the National Heritage List for England was updated to include the WI connection, as were records for three other buildings of WI significance.

== Schools ==
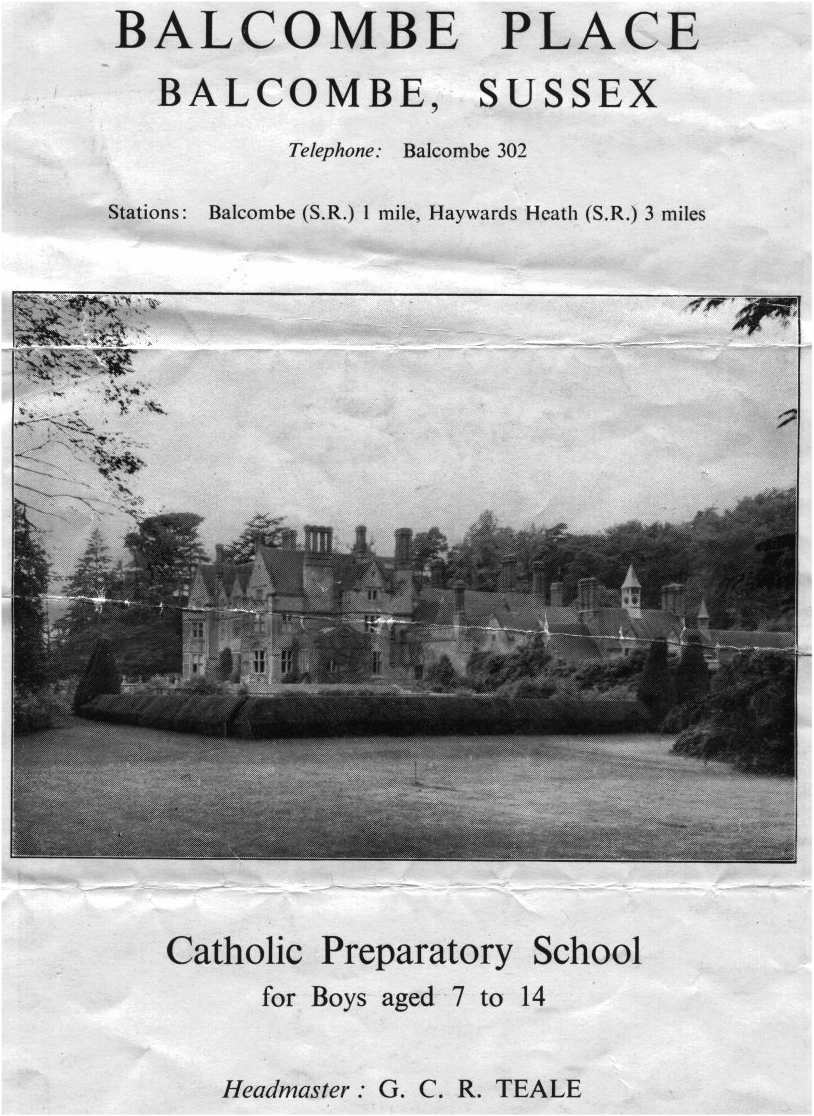
School prospectus. 1955

In 1955 Mr Geoffrey Teale transferred and renamed his existing school (Whispers) in Wadhurst to Balcombe Place. Balcombe Place School was a Roman Catholic preparatory school for 50 boys, aged 6 to 14. Teale retired in 1969. Another Sussex school, Bishop Sutton, run by Mr Kevin Botting, moved into Balcombe Place which merged with the existing school. In their final year, the pupils were trained for passing the Common Entrance examination to qualify for entrance to independent public schools. The 21-year lease ended in 1976.

Notable alumni:

- Edward Duke (actor)
- Fr Boniface Hunt

== Possible demolition ==
Unfavourable changes in capital gains tax and the ongoing maintenance costs for country houses, encouraged some owners to sell or demolish their buildings. The owners of Balcombe Place applied. It was refused, and it became a listed building in April 1977. The building had its original plumbing system, old and inefficient heating, and wiring from the 1930s. It was "unoccupied and in a fast deteriorating condition". Damage from vandalism included organ pipes ripped out and some of the Spanish leather panels were torn.

== Later history ==
It was advertised in business magazines as a location for meetings, training courses or conferences. It was described as having "16 bedroom suites and meeting rooms holding up to 70 people."

In 1976 the owners successfully converted the derelict stables into offices, renovating and restoring as much of the existing structure as possible with no serious structural alterations, and no extensions or demolition. Since the late 1980s, the building has been used as a care home. In 2006 further alterations were made to the old stable block. The squash court's viewing gallery was enlarged and doors were added on the ground floor. In 2008 the original (narrow) staircase in the squash court which had led to a viewing gallery, was removed.

From September 2017, the family regained use of Balcombe Place and began renovations to restore the country house. It is now offered as an exclusive use events venue throughout the year.

== See also ==
- Grade II* listed buildings in West Sussex
