= Grade II* listed buildings in West Sussex =

West Sussex shown within England

There are over 20,000 Grade II* listed buildings in England. This page is a list of these buildings in the county of West Sussex by district.

== Adur ==
Name	Location	Type	Completed (Note: The date given is the date used by Historic England as significant for the initial building or that of an important part in the structure's description.)	Date designated	Grid ref. (Note: The grid reference is based on the British national grid reference system, sometimes known as OSGB36, used by the Ordnance Survey.) Geo-coordinates	Entry number (Note: The "List Entry Number" is a unique number assigned to each listed building and scheduled monument by Historic England.)	Image
Shoreham Airport: Terminal building, control tower, offices, customs hall, restaurant and bars	Lancing	Airport	1936	27 July 1984	TQ2046905171; 50°50′01″N 0°17′26″W	1353731	Shoreham Airport: Terminal building, control tower, offices, customs hall, restaurant and bars More images
Lancing College, Great School	Lancing	School	1881	2 December 1985	TQ1946306605; 50°50′48″N 0°18′16″W	1353753	Lancing College, Great School More images
Lancing College, east and west quadrangles	Lancing	School	1866	27 July 1984	TQ1949206554; 50°50′46″N 0°18′15″W	1353732	Upload Photo
Shoreham Tollbridge	Old Shoreham, Shoreham-by-Sea	Footbridge	1781	12 October 1954	TQ2055805970; 50°50′27″N 0°17′21″W	1027895	Shoreham Tollbridge More images
St Michael and All Angels Church	Southwick	Parish church	12th century	19 July 1950	TQ2393405402; 50°50′06″N 0°14′29″W	1353751	St Michael and All Angels Church More images
Marlipins Museum	Shoreham-by-Sea	Museum	c. 1130	8 May 1950	TQ2149405024; 50°49′55″N 0°16′34″W	1353757	Marlipins Museum More images
49 The Green	Southwick	House	Early 18th century	19 July 1950	TQ2409405343; 50°50′04″N 0°14′21″W	1027852	49 The Green

== Arun ==
Name	Location	Type	Completed	Date designated	Grid ref. Geo-coordinates	Entry number	Image
Ecclesden Manor	Angmering	House	1634	12 October 1954	TQ0783604361; 50°49′44″N 0°28′13″W	1027679	Ecclesden Manor More images
Newplace Farmhouse	Angmering	Farmhouse	Late 16th and early 17th century	12 October 1954	TQ0631805578; 50°50′24″N 0°29′29″W	1232882	Upload Photo
St Margaret's Church	Angmering	Parish church	13th century	12 October 1954	TQ0671604361; 50°49′44″N 0°29′10″W	1027708	St Margaret's Church More images
Hiorns Tower	Arundel	Folly	Post-1789	26 March 1949	TQ0128608085; 50°51′48″N 0°33′44″W	1353747	Hiorns Tower More images
61 High Street	Arundel	Town house	18th century	26 March 1949	TQ0182107141; 50°51′17″N 0°33′17″W	1027947	61 High Street More images
26 Maltravers Street	Arundel	House	17th century	26 March 1949	TQ0164807097; 50°51′16″N 0°33′26″W	1278040	26 Maltravers Street More images
Norfolk Hotel	Arundel	Hotel	1785	26 March 1949	TQ0188407122; 50°51′17″N 0°33′14″W	1027908	Norfolk Hotel More images
The Priory (St Wilfred's)	Arundel	Priory	1380 to 1542	7 October 1974	TQ0168107206; 50°51′20″N 0°33′24″W	1027913	The Priory (St Wilfred's) More images
51 High Street	Arundel	House	18th century	7 October 1974	TQ0184707112; 50°51′16″N 0°33′16″W	1263836	51 High Street More images
Hotham Park House	Bognor Regis	House	1793	4 August 1971	SZ9404999410; 50°47′12″N 0°40′02″W	1027745	Hotham Park House More images
The Old Farmhouse	Clapham	Farmhouse	17th century or earlier	12 October 1954	TQ0960706577; 50°50′54″N 0°26′40″W	1276658	Upload Photo
Bailiffscourt Hotel and Country Club	Climping	Country house	1933	20 September 1984	TQ0016000807; 50°47′53″N 0°34′48″W	1027676	Bailiffscourt Hotel and Country Club More images
Bailiffscourt Chapel	Climping	Chapel	13th century	5 June 1958	TQ0021600899; 50°47′56″N 0°34′46″W	1233450	Bailiffscourt Chapel More images
Guest house to Bailiffscourt Hotel and Country Club	Climping	Guest house	1931–35	14 October 1991	TQ0012600828; 50°47′54″N 0°34′50″W	1274459	Upload Photo
Priory Farmhouse	Crossbush	Farmhouse	Modern	12 October 1954	TQ0247406337; 50°50′51″N 0°32′45″W	1034405	Priory Farmhouse
St George's Church	Eastergate	Parish church	Norman	5 June 1958	SU9451805095; 50°50′16″N 0°39′33″W	1233516	St George's Church More images
Blake's Cottage	Felpham	House	17th century	22 July 1949	SZ9508399656; 50°47′19″N 0°39′09″W	1353792	Blake's Cottage More images
St Mary the Virgin's Church	Felpham	Parish church	11th to 15th centuries	22 July 1949	SZ9493799880; 50°47′27″N 0°39′16″W	1293556	St Mary the Virgin's Church More images
Findon Place	Findon	Country house	Mid-18th century	12 October 1954	TQ1172008456; 50°51′53″N 0°24′50″W	1027620	Findon Place More images
St Nicholas' Church	Houghton	Parish church	13th century	12 October 1954	TQ0202811582; 50°53′41″N 0°33′02″W	1027636	St Nicholas' Church More images
St Mary Magdalene's Church	Madehurst	Parish church	Medieval	5 June 1958	SU9848309993; 50°52′52″N 0°36′05″W	1276202	St Mary Magdalene's Church More images
Homing Cottage	North Bersted	Timber-framed house	15th century	16 September 1977	SU9256401258; 50°48′13″N 0°41′16″W	1233180	Upload Photo
Knightscroft	Rustington	House	1879	15 February 1973	TQ0492001860; 50°48′24″N 0°30′44″W	1027592	Knightscroft
Slindon House (Slindon College)	Slindon	Country house	c. 1560	5 June 1958	SU9600308480; 50°52′04″N 0°38′14″W	1221729	Slindon House (Slindon College) More images
St Mary Magdalene's Church	South Bersted	Parish church	13th century	22 July 1949	SU9347200224; 50°47′39″N 0°40′31″W	1190914	St Mary Magdalene's Church More images
Tortington Priory barn	Tortington	Barn	Early 18th century	20 September 1984	TQ0065605968; 50°50′40″N 0°34′18″W	1221996	Tortington Priory barn
Walberton House	Walberton	Country house	c. 1817	5 June 1958	SU9724005726; 50°50′34″N 0°37′13″W	1222531	Walberton House More images

== Chichester ==
Name	Location	Type	Completed	Date designated	Grid ref. Geo-coordinates	Entry number	Image
Yeoman's House	Bignor	House	15th century	22 February 1955	SU9846014577; 50°55′20″N 0°36′02″W	1026557	Yeoman's House More images
Sorrell House	Bosham	House	1960	15 July 1998	SU8152601736; 50°48′34″N 0°50′39″W	1375664	Upload Photo
Chichester Festival Theatre	Chichester	Theatre	1962	12 June 1998	SU8618405542; 50°50′35″N 0°46′38″W	1323693	Chichester Festival Theatre More images
St Andrew-in-the-Oxmarket Church	Chichester	Arts centre	1971–76	5 July 1950	SU8622704835; 50°50′12″N 0°46′37″W	1026778	St Andrew-in-the-Oxmarket Church More images
Fernleigh	Chichester	House	19th century	8 October 1971	SU8607105106; 50°50′21″N 0°46′44″W	1026714	Fernleigh More images
Friars Gate House	Chichester	House	18th century	5 July 1950	SU8632704985; 50°50′17″N 0°46′31″W	1354315	Friars Gate House More images
Regnum Club and Victoria League	Chichester	House	Early 18th century	5 July 1950	SU8605304590; 50°50′04″N 0°46′46″W	1026659	Regnum Club and Victoria League More images
Richmond House	Chichester	House	18th century	5 July 1950	SU8605204608; 50°50′05″N 0°46′46″W	1354341	Richmond House More images
St Martin's House	Chichester	House	c. 1680	5 July 1950	SU8618504967; 50°50′16″N 0°46′39″W	1026701	St Martin's House More images
The Council Chamber and Assembly Room	Chichester	Assembly rooms	1783	5 July 1950	SU8611404955; 50°50′16″N 0°46′42″W	1354331	The Council Chamber and Assembly Room More images
The Deanery	Chichester	House	1725	5 July 1950	SU8590604643; 50°50′06″N 0°46′53″W	1287003	The Deanery More images
Former Corn Exchange	Chichester	Shop	1830	5 July 1950	SU8631204767; 50°50′10″N 0°46′32″W	1192106	Former Corn Exchange More images
The Market House and Art Annexe of Chichester College of Further Education	Chichester	College	1807	5 July 1950	SU8610004874; 50°50′13″N 0°46′43″W	1354333	The Market House and Art Annexe of Chichester College of Further Education More images
Royal Arms	Chichester	Public house	1591	5 July 1950	SU8609004802; 50°50′11″N 0°46′44″W	1192187	Royal Arms More images
Royal West Sussex Hospital	Chichester	Apartments	1825	8 October 1971	SU8597905681; 50°50′39″N 0°46′49″W	1354267	Royal West Sussex Hospital More images
Ship Hotel	Chichester	Hotel	18th century	5 July 1950	SU8612105143; 50°50′22″N 0°46′42″W	1026718	Ship Hotel More images
Wall, railings and gateway to Pallant House	Chichester	Gateway		8 October 1971	SU8615204667; 50°50′06″N 0°46′41″W	1026744	Wall, railings and gateway to Pallant House More images
31 North Street	Chichester	House	18th century	5 July 1950	SU8607805030; 50°50′18″N 0°46′44″W	1026710	31 North Street More images
41 and 42 North Street	Chichester	House	Early 18th century	5 July 1950	SU8608905126; 50°50′21″N 0°46′43″W	1354326	41 and 42 North Street More images
43 North Street	Chichester	House	Early 18th century	5 July 1950	SU8609405140; 50°50′22″N 0°46′43″W	1026715	43 North Street More images
86 and 87 North Street	Chichester	House	18th century	8 October 1971	SU8608804839; 50°50′12″N 0°46′44″W	1193602	86 and 87 North Street More images
17 and 18 South Street	Chichester	House	Early 18th century	8 October 1971	SU8603304706; 50°50′08″N 0°46′47″W	1354377	17 and 18 South Street More images
19 South Street	Chichester	House	Early 19th century	8 October 1971	SU8603204696; 50°50′07″N 0°46′47″W	1285563	19 South Street More images
19a South Street	Chichester	House	17th century	8 October 1971	SU8603404689; 50°50′07″N 0°46′47″W	1026654	19a South Street More images
20 South Street	Chichester	House	17th century	5 July 1950	SU8603004685; 50°50′07″N 0°46′47″W	1354378	20 South Street More images
21–23 South Street	Chichester	House	17th century	8 October 1971	SU8602904675; 50°50′07″N 0°46′47″W	1285567	21–23 South Street More images
44 South Street (RBS Bank)	Chichester	House/bank	Early 19th century	5 July 1950	SU8604404564; 50°50′03″N 0°46′46″W	1181076	44 South Street (RBS Bank) More images
11 Eastgate Square	Chichester	House	18th century	3 February 1960	SU8647104763; 50°50′09″N 0°46′24″W	1026792	11 Eastgate Square More images
20 St Martin's Square	Chichester	House	18th century	5 July 1950	SU8619904942; 50°50′15″N 0°46′38″W	1285911	20 St Martin's Square More images
5 East Pallant	Chichester	House	Late 18th century	8 October 1971	SU8617704644; 50°50′06″N 0°46′39″W	1286852	5 East Pallant More images
21 St Martin's Square	Chichester	House	18th century	5 July 1950	SU8618504935; 50°50′15″N 0°46′39″W	1354324	21 St Martin's Square More images
8 St Martin's Square	Chichester	House	18th century	5 July 1950	SU8619805034; 50°50′18″N 0°46′38″W	1026702	8 St Martin's Square More images
93 East Street	Chichester	Shop	Late 16th century	8 October 1971	SU8608304802; 50°50′11″N 0°46′44″W	1354285	93 East Street More images
Middleton House	Chidham	House	1759	5 June 1958	SU7903604077; 50°49′51″N 0°52′45″W	1230503	Upload Photo
St Mary's Church	Chidham	Parish church	13th century	5 June 1958	SU7879503924; 50°49′46″N 0°52′57″W	1026418	St Mary's Church More images
St Mary's Church	Compton	Parish church	13th century	5 June 1958	SU7777814770; 50°55′38″N 0°53′41″W	1026421	St Mary's Church More images
The Old Manor House	Donnington	House	1677	5 June 1958	SU8519101977; 50°48′40″N 0°47′32″W	1354492	Upload Photo
Earnley Church	Earnley	Parish church	13th century	5 June 1958	SZ8161696936; 50°45′59″N 0°50′39″W	1026360	Earnley Church More images
Chapel at King Edward VII Hospital	Easebourne	Chapel	1906	2 March 1973	SU8786624970; 51°01′03″N 0°44′55″W	1232485	Upload Photo
King Edward VII Hospital	Easebourne	Hospital	1906	2 March 1973	SU8800324930; 51°01′01″N 0°44′48″W	1026020	King Edward VII Hospital More images
The Old Vicarage	Easebourne	House	18th century	18 June 1959	SU8965822720; 50°59′49″N 0°43′25″W	1026039	The Old Vicarage
Newhouse Farmhouse	East Dean	Farmhouse	18th century	28 January 1986	SU9070614152; 50°55′11″N 0°42′39″W	1026378	Upload Photo
Beechwood	East Lavington	House	18th century	18 June 1959	SU9483916276; 50°56′17″N 0°39′06″W	1232514	Upload Photo
Lavington Park (Seaford College)	East Lavington	House	Elizabethan	18 June 1959	SU9458116321; 50°56′19″N 0°39′19″W	1232490	Lavington Park (Seaford College) More images
St Peter's Church	East Lavington	School chapel	13th century	18 June 1959	SU9462016263; 50°56′17″N 0°39′17″W	1354682	St Peter's Church More images
Church of the Assumption of St Mary the Virgin	East Wittering	Redundant church	Early 12th century	5 June 1958	SZ8021997890; 50°46′30″N 0°51′49″W	1354484	Church of the Assumption of St Mary the Virgin More images
Ebernoe House	Ebernoe	House	Late 18th century	22 February 1955	SU9734828027; 51°02′36″N 0°36′46″W	1026468	Ebernoe House More images
Ruins of St Mary's Old Church	Treyford	Redundant church	13th century	18 June 1959	SU8242918687; 50°57′42″N 0°49′40″W	1275251	Ruins of St Mary's Old Church More images
St Paul's Church	Elsted	Parish church	11th century	18 June 1959	SU8160619788; 50°58′18″N 0°50′21″W	1026026	St Paul's Church More images
Treyford Manor	Treyford	Manor house	Medieval	18 June 1959	SU8244518655; 50°57′41″N 0°49′39″W	1217783	Treyford Manor More images
The White House	Fernhurst	House	Early 18th century (refaced)	18 June 1959	SU8994128539; 51°02′57″N 0°43′06″W	1354707	The White House More images
Upper North Park Farmhouse	Fernhurst	Farmhouse	17th century	18 June 1959	SU8728427612; 51°02′28″N 0°45′23″W	1276903	Upload Photo
Sennicotts	East Ashling, Funtington	House	c. 1810	28 January 1986	SU8368507038; 50°51′25″N 0°48′45″W	1026351	Upload Photo
St Mary's Church	Funtington	Parish church	13th century	5 June 1958	SU8007208155; 50°52′03″N 0°51′49″W	1026342	St Mary's Church More images
St James's Church	Heyshott	Parish church	1882	18 June 1959	SU8972718132; 50°57′20″N 0°43′26″W	1233567	St James's Church More images
The Manor House	Hunston	Manor house	Late 17th century	5 June 1958	SU8641501410; 50°48′21″N 0°46′30″W	1026332	The Manor House More images
Bridge Farmhouse	Linchmere	Farmhouse	16th century	18 June 1959	SU8582631854; 51°04′47″N 0°46′34″W	1025943	Upload Photo
St Peter's Church	Linchmere	Parish church	Medieval	18 June 1959	SU8697830904; 51°04′15″N 0°45′36″W	1276459	St Peter's Church More images
The Manor House	Lodsworth	House	13th to 14th century	18 June 1959	SU9312622706; 50°59′46″N 0°40′28″W	1354742	The Manor House More images
The Old House	Lodsworth	House	1728	18 June 1959	SU9286222854; 50°59′51″N 0°40′41″W	1025913	The Old House More images
St Peter's Church	Lodsworth	Parish church	13th century	18 June 1959	SU9310322772; 50°59′49″N 0°40′29″W	1025908	St Peter's Church More images
Blackdown House	Blackdown	House	17th century	18 June 1959	SU9173128603; 51°02′58″N 0°41′34″W	1354734	Blackdown House More images
Noah's Ark Inn	Lurgashall	Public house	17th century (probably)	26 November 1987	SU9370727201; 51°02′12″N 0°39′54″W	1276264	Noah's Ark Inn More images
St Lawrence's Church	Lurgashall	Parish church	14th century	18 June 1959	SU9381127286; 51°02′14″N 0°39′48″W	1276255	St Lawrence's Church More images
Upper Roundhurst Farmhouse	Blackdown	Farmhouse	Late 17th century	18 June 1959	SU9273630413; 51°03′56″N 0°40′41″W	1234523	Upload Photo
Valewood Farmhouse	Lurgashall	Farmhouse	16th century or earlier	18 June 1959	SU9047031626; 51°04′37″N 0°42′36″W	1354733	Valewood Farmhouse More images
St Mary Magdalene and St Denys' Church	Midhurst	Parish church	13th century	18 June 1959	SU8871321483; 50°59′09″N 0°44′15″W	1234717	St Mary Magdalene and St Denys' Church More images
Bowley Farmhouse	South Mundham	Farmhouse	17th century	5 June 1958	SZ8865999869; 50°47′30″N 0°44′37″W	1232654	Upload Photo
Fernden and Mundham House	North Mundham	House	17th century or earlier	5 June 1958	SU8754201907; 50°48′36″N 0°45′32″W	1026281	Upload Photo
South Mundham Farmhouse	South Mundham	Farmhouse	1671	5 June 1958	SU8773000757; 50°47′59″N 0°45′23″W	1026284	Upload Photo
St Stephen's Church	North Mundham	Parish church	13th century	5 June 1958	SU8744602139; 50°48′44″N 0°45′37″W	1026279	St Stephen's Church More images
Shopwyke Hall	Oving	House	1720	5 June 1958	SU8867305162; 50°50′21″N 0°44′31″W	1026295	Shopwyke Hall
Avenings	Petworth	House	Late 18th century	22 February 1955	SU9768221652; 50°59′10″N 0°36′35″W	1224444	Avenings More images
St Bartholomew's Church	Egdean	Parish church	Medieval	22 February 1955	SU9965420098; 50°58′18″N 0°34′55″W	1226330	St Bartholomew's Church More images
Daintrey House	Petworth	House	16th century	22 February 1955	SU9777621691; 50°59′11″N 0°36′30″W	1266902	Daintrey House More images
The Leads, Denne Court, Stringer's Hall and Stringer's Cottage	Petworth	Houses	18th century	22 February 1955	SU9779221722; 50°59′12″N 0°36′29″W	1224229	The Leads, Denne Court, Stringer's Hall and Stringer's Cottage More images
New Grove	Petworth	House	17th century	22 February 1955	SU9800221230; 50°58′56″N 0°36′19″W	1266633	New Grove More images
Newlands	Petworth	Office	Late 18th century	22 February 1955	SU9759221476; 50°59′04″N 0°36′40″W	1265984	Newlands More images
North House	Petworth	House	18th century (front)	22 February 1955	SU9772221901; 50°59′18″N 0°36′33″W	1266148	North House More images
Somerset Hospital	Petworth	House	Early 17th century	22 February 1955	SU9769821966; 50°59′20″N 0°36′34″W	1266149	Somerset Hospital More images
Somerset Lodge	Petworth	House	1653	22 February 1955	SU9769221982; 50°59′20″N 0°36′34″W	1266109	Somerset Lodge
Petworth House main gate, lodge and wall	Petworth	Gateway	Late 18th century	22 February 1955	SU9757121742; 50°59′13″N 0°36′41″W	1266060	Petworth House main gate, lodge and wall
Petworth House servants' wing	Petworth	Offices	Early 18th century	22 February 1955	SU9764221905; 50°59′18″N 0°36′37″W	1226045	Petworth House servants' wing More images
Petworth House stables	Petworth	Stables	Mid-19th century	22 February 1955	SU9762321799; 50°59′14″N 0°36′38″W	1226050	Upload Photo
Town Hall	Petworth	Town hall	1793	22 February 1955	SU9765221679; 50°59′10″N 0°36′37″W	1225590	Town Hall More images
York Cottage	Petworth	House	17th century	22 February 1955	SU9758821488; 50°59′04″N 0°36′40″W	1265924	Upload Photo
Shillinglee House	Plaistow	Apartments	1735	2 November 1998	SU9684332508; 51°05′01″N 0°37′08″W	1226667	Shillinglee House More images
Barn at Wenham Manor Farm	Rogate	Barn	17th century	18 June 1959	SU7889023553; 51°00′21″N 0°52′37″W	1275582	Upload Photo
St Peter's Church	Terwick	Parish church	12th century	18 June 1959	SU8178423512; 51°00′19″N 0°50′09″W	1217093	St Peter's Church More images
Fyning House, Old Fyning House and the Bothy	Fyning, Rogate	House	Late 18th and early 19th century	18 June 1959	SU8132823862; 51°00′30″N 0°50′32″W	1217049	Upload Photo
Severels	Runcton	House	1981	29 August 2013	SU8837701988; 50°48′38″N 0°44′49″W	1409992	Upload Photo
St Mary's Church	Rumboldswyke, Chichester	Redundant church	11th century	5 July 1950	SU8697604108; 50°49′48″N 0°45′59″W	1354384	St Mary's Church More images
Fox Hall	Charlton, Singleton	House	Post-1813 (possibly)	5 June 1958	SU8885412827; 50°54′29″N 0°44′15″W	1026196	Fox Hall More images
Lumley Mill	Lumley, Southbourne	Mill house	Early 19th century	10 May 1973	SU7523806376; 50°51′07″N 0°55′57″W	1026179	Lumley Mill More images
The Old House	Prinsted, Southbourne	House	14th century	6 January 1995	SU7664305370; 50°50′34″N 0°54′46″W	1221938	The Old House More images
Lee Farmhouse	Stopham	Farmhouse	1492	22 February 1955	TQ0203818571; 50°57′27″N 0°32′55″W	1227068	Upload Photo
Manor Farmhouse	Stopham	Farmhouse	c. 1485	22 February 1955	TQ0263619017; 50°57′41″N 0°32′24″W	1265614	Manor Farmhouse More images
Lordington House	Racton	House	c. 1500	5 June 1958	SU7816809836; 50°52′58″N 0°53′25″W	1034423	Lordington House More images
Stansted House	Stansted, Stoughton	House	1686	5 June 1958	SU7613010316; 50°53′14″N 0°55′09″W	1354611	Stansted House More images
Stansted House former stables and service wing	Stansted, Stoughton	Stables	1786	5 June 1958	SU7613210386; 50°53′17″N 0°55′08″W	1365311	Stansted House former stables and service wing More images
Pitshill	Tillington	House	1760	18 June 1959	SU9489622900; 50°59′52″N 0°38′57″W	1217563	Pitshill More images
The Manor of Dean	Tillington	House	1613	18 June 1959	SU9505222169; 50°59′28″N 0°38′49″W	1217310	The Manor of Dean
The Old Manor House	Tillington	Estate cottage	16th century	18 June 1959	SU9617321962; 50°59′21″N 0°37′52″W	1275370	The Old Manor House
Tillington House	Tillington	House	Early 19th century	18 June 1959	SU9646821805; 50°59′15″N 0°37′37″W	1217637	Tillington House More images
Terwick Mill	Trotton with Chithurst	House	16th and mid-18th centuries	18 June 1959	SU8308522159; 50°59′34″N 0°49′03″W	1221355	Terwick Mill More images
The Dovecot at Trotton Place to the North East of the House	Trotton with Chithurst	Dovecote	1626	18 June 1959	SU8359322632; 50°59′49″N 0°48′37″W	1221284	Upload Photo
Trotton Place	Trotton with Chithurst	House	16th century (core)	18 June 1959	SU8362122556; 50°59′47″N 0°48′35″W	1221283	Upload Photo
Binderton House	West Dean	House	c. 1680	5 June 1958	SU8498310826; 50°53′26″N 0°47′35″W	1354593	Binderton House More images
The parish church of St Andrew	West Dean	Parish church	Pre-Conquest	5 June 1958	SU8614812613; 50°54′24″N 0°46′34″W	1026124	The parish church of St Andrew More images
West Dean College, West Dean Park	West Dean	House	1804	19 July 1985	SU8616912575; 50°54′22″N 0°46′33″W	1026116	West Dean College, West Dean Park More images
Itchenor Park Farm Cottages and the farm buildings adjoining	West Itchenor	Farm labourers' cottage	1782	5 June 1958	SU7972300818; 50°48′05″N 0°52′12″W	1026103	Upload Photo
The parish church of St Mary Magdalene	West Lavington	Church	1850	18 June 1959	SU8916620540; 50°58′39″N 0°43′53″W	1275104	The parish church of St Mary Magdalene More images
Cakeham Manor	West Wittering	Farmhouse	18th century	28 January 1986	SZ7847697578; 50°46′21″N 0°53′18″W	1221649	Cakeham Manor More images
Westbourne House	Westbourne	House	18th century	5 June 1958	SU7564507549; 50°51′45″N 0°55′36″W	1354623	Westbourne House More images
Cookes House	West Burton	House	c. 1588	22 February 1955	TQ0001913868; 50°54′56″N 0°34′43″W	1026532	Cookes House
Carne's Seat to the north of Goodwood House	Goodwood Park, Westhampnett	Garden building	1743	5 June 1958	SU8886009558; 50°52′43″N 0°44′18″W	1026090	Upload Photo
Laundry Green the Gordon Rooms	Goodwood Park, Westhampnett	House	Late 18th century	28 January 1986	SU8861008835; 50°52′20″N 0°44′31″W	1275619	Upload Photo
Molecomb	Goodwood Park, Westhampnett	Dower house	1777	5 June 1958	SU8949310070; 50°53′00″N 0°43′45″W	1276481	Upload Photo
The parish church of St Peter	Westhampnett	Parish church	11th century	5 June 1958	SU8808906176; 50°50′54″N 0°45′00″W	1026099	The parish church of St Peter More images
Woolbeding Bridge	Woolbeding with Redford	Bridge	15th to 16th century	18 June 1959	SU8727822041; 50°59′28″N 0°45′28″W	1221570	Woolbeding Bridge More images
Harting War Memorial	South Harting	War memorial	1920	11 October 2016	SU7843819423; 50°58′08″N 0°53′03″W	1438494	Harting War Memorial More images

== Crawley ==
Name	Location	Type	Completed	Date designated	Grid ref. Geo-coordinates	Entry number	Image
Charlwood House	Lowfield Heath	Country house	17th century	11 November 1966	TQ2632639856; 51°08′39″N 0°11′44″W	1187080	Charlwood House More images
Charlwood Park Farmhouse	Lowfield Heath	Farmhouse	Early 17th century	11 November 1966	TQ2616941593; 51°09′35″N 0°11′50″W	1187090	Charlwood Park Farmhouse More images
St Michael and All Angels Church	Lowfield Heath	Church	1867	21 June 1948	TQ2741940102; 51°08′46″N 0°10′47″W	1187081	St Michael and All Angels Church More images
Ewhurst Place	Ifield	House	18th century	21 June 1948	TQ2586937519; 51°07′23″N 0°12′10″W	1187092	Ewhurst Place
Gatwick Manor Inn Hyders Hall	Lowfield Heath	Public house	c. 1600	21 June 1948	TQ2712439332; 51°08′21″N 0°11′03″W	1187103	Gatwick Manor Inn Hyders Hall More images
Meeting House Cottage	Ifield	House	16th century	21 June 1948	TQ2523537908; 51°07′36″N 0°12′42″W	1207683	Meeting House Cottage More images
Old Punch Bowl	Crawley	Public house	15th century	21 June 1948	TQ2682736771; 51°06′58″N 0°11′22″W	1187086	Old Punch Bowl More images
St John the Baptist's Church	Crawley	Parish church	15th century	21 June 1948	TQ2686836540; 51°06′51″N 0°11′20″W	1298875	St John the Baptist's Church More images
Rowley Farmhouse	Lowfield Heath	Farmhouse	c. 1700	21 June 1948	TQ2794439634; 51°08′30″N 0°10′21″W	1187079	Rowley Farmhouse
Ancient Priors	Crawley	Restaurant	c. 1530	21 June 1948	TQ2678836580; 51°06′52″N 0°11′24″W	1207420	Ancient Priors More images
The Beehive (former combined terminal and control tower)	Gatwick Airport	Airport building	1936	19 August 1996	TQ2857739938; 51°08′39″N 0°09′48″W	1268327	The Beehive (former combined terminal and control tower) More images
The George Hotel	Crawley	Hotel	15th century	21 June 1948	TQ2672836603; 51°06′53″N 0°11′27″W	1187088	The George Hotel More images

== Horsham ==
Name	Location	Type	Completed	Date designated	Grid ref. Geo-coordinates	Entry number	Image
Kennards	Amberley	Timber-framed house	17th century or earlier	15 March 1955	TQ0315313244; 50°54′34″N 0°32′03″W	1353955	Kennards More images
North Stoke House	North Stoke, Amberley	House	18th century or earlier	15 March 1955	TQ0200410801; 50°53′16″N 0°33′04″W	1353956	North Stoke House More images
The parish church of St Peter and St Paul	Ashington	Parish church	15th century	15 March 1955	TQ1288415890; 50°55′53″N 0°23′42″W	1027442	The parish church of St Peter and St Paul More images
Peppers	Ashurst	House	1914	15 March 1955	TQ1690416074; 50°55′56″N 0°20′16″W	1286873	Peppers
Fossbrooks and Parbrook	Parbrook, Billingshurst	Timber-framed house	16th century	22 September 1959	TQ0741523236; 50°59′55″N 0°28′14″W	1027114	Fossbrooks and Parbrook
Ye Old Six Bells Inn	Billingshurst	Inn	16th century	22 September 1959	TQ0862825957; 51°01′22″N 0°27′09″W	1027137	Ye Old Six Bells Inn More images
The parish church of St Giles	Coldwaltham	Parish church	13th century	15 March 1955	TQ0234416540; 50°56′21″N 0°32′41″W	1027424	The parish church of St Giles More images
Holmbush	Faygate, Colgate	Country house	1823	22 September 1959	TQ2250933758; 51°05′24″N 0°15′08″W	1193998	Holmbush
Brook Place	Cowfold	Timber-framed house	16th century	22 September 1959	TQ2153023371; 50°59′49″N 0°16′10″W	1027087	Brook Place
Capon's Farmhouse	Cowfold	House	c. 1300	22 September 1959	TQ2057722744; 50°59′29″N 0°17′00″W	1027095	Capon's Farmhouse More images
St. Hugh's Charterhouse, Parkminster	Parkminster, Cowfold	Garden wall	1875–83	4 September 1980	TQ2064420698; 50°58′23″N 0°16′59″W	1027084	St. Hugh's Charterhouse, Parkminster More images
Potwell	Henfield	House	18th century	15 March 1955	TQ2125015884; 50°55′47″N 0°16′34″W	1027397	Potwell More images
Rus House	Henfield	House	Early 19th century	15 March 1955	TQ2153015829; 50°55′45″N 0°16′19″W	1192586	Rus House More images
The parish church of St Peter	Henfield	Parish church	c. 1200	15 March 1955	TQ2121216178; 50°55′56″N 0°16′35″W	1027400	The parish church of St Peter More images
Wantley Manor	Henfield	House	18th century	15 March 1955	TQ2154416308; 50°56′00″N 0°16′18″W	1027376	Upload Photo
Former stables and coach house block at Muntham House School	Barns Green, Itchingfield	Stables	Early 19th century	22 September 1959	TQ1239627647; 51°02′14″N 0°23′54″W	1354175	Upload Photo
Priest's House	Itchingfield	Clergy house	15th century	22 September 1959	TQ1312928910; 51°02′54″N 0°23′15″W	1027046	Priest's House More images
The parish church of St Nicolas	Itchingfield	Parish church	Norman	22 September 1959	TQ1313828938; 51°02′55″N 0°23′14″W	1193818	The parish church of St Nicolas More images
Springhead Farmhouse	Parham	House	1811	15 March 1955	TQ0602613314; 50°54′34″N 0°29′36″W	1027360	Upload Photo
Wiggonholt House	Wiggonholt, Parham	House	1811	15 March 1955	TQ0612916713; 50°56′24″N 0°29′27″W	1193309	Wiggonholt House
New Place Manor	Pulborough	House	Medieval	15 March 1955	TQ0534119321; 50°57′49″N 0°30′05″W	1027340	New Place Manor
Old Place	Pulborough	House	15th century	15 March 1955	TQ0452118958; 50°57′38″N 0°30′47″W	1286130	Old Place More images
The Old House	Pulborough	Timber-framed house	17th century or earlier	15 March 1955	TQ0475218739; 50°57′31″N 0°30′36″W	1193380	The Old House More images
The Rectory	Pulborough	Vicarage	Late 18th century	9 May 1980	TQ0485518806; 50°57′33″N 0°30′30″W	1027312	The Rectory
Garlands	The Haven, Rudgwick	Timber-framed house	17th century or earlier	22 September 1959	TQ0821031005; 51°04′05″N 0°27′25″W	1354197	Garlands More images
The parish church of St Giles	Shermanbury	Parish church	14th century	15 March 1955	TQ2142218834; 50°57′22″N 0°16′21″W	1194079	The parish church of St Giles More images
Barnhouse Farmhouse	Coolham, Shipley	Farmhouse	17th century or earlier	22 September 1959	TQ1256521683; 50°59′01″N 0°23′52″W	1180549	Barnhouse Farmhouse
King's Windmill	Shipley	Corn mill	1879	22 September 1959	TQ1432421870; 50°59′06″N 0°22′22″W	1180806	King's Windmill More images
Knepp Castle and stables adjoining to north west	Shipley	Country house	1800 and 1813	22 September 1959	TQ1564221717; 50°59′00″N 0°21′14″W	1354214	Knepp Castle and stables adjoining to north west More images
Arts Centre and Music School at Christ's Hospital	Southwater	Transformer station	1972–74	4 December 2000	TQ1475028268; 51°02′32″N 0°21′52″W	1247243	Arts Centre and Music School at Christ's Hospital
Christ's Hospital: dining hall and water tower to north, school to south, collannaded wings to east and west (chapel in west wing) forming a quadrangle	Southwater	Gate	1902	22 September 1959	TQ1481228353; 51°02′35″N 0°21′49″W	1027034	Christ's Hospital: dining hall and water tower to north, school to south, collannaded wings to east and west (chapel in west wing) forming a quadrangle
Great House Farmhouse	Southwater	Farmhouse	Late 15th or early 16th century	27 November 1980	TQ1531726931; 51°01′49″N 0°21′25″W	1286023	Upload Photo
Barn to north west of Charlton Court	Steyning	Tithe barn	Pre-1414	9 May 1980	TQ1690811860; 50°53′40″N 0°20′21″W	1180715	Barn to north west of Charlton Court More images
Chantry House	Steyning	House	18th century	15 March 1955	TQ1771811314; 50°53′22″N 0°19′40″W	1194515	Chantry House More images
Charlton House and garden wall, gate and railings to north east	Steyning	Manager's house	Early 18th century	15 March 1955	TQ1777411067; 50°53′14″N 0°19′37″W	1027280	Charlton House and garden wall, gate and railings to north east More images
Penfold House and Penfold Lodge	Steyning	House	18th century	15 March 1955	TQ1771911133; 50°53′16″N 0°19′40″W	1180501	Penfold House and Penfold Lodge More images
Springwells Hotel	Steyning	House	18th century	15 March 1955	TQ1775511092; 50°53′14″N 0°19′38″W	1027281	Springwells Hotel More images
The Stone House	Steyning	House	1955	15 March 1955	TQ1768811143; 50°53′16″N 0°19′42″W	1180508	The Stone House More images
1, 3 and 5 Church Street	Steyning	House	18th century	15 March 1955	TQ1772011169; 50°53′17″N 0°19′40″W	1285733	1, 3 and 5 Church Street More images
61, 63 and 65 High Street	Steyning	Jettied house	Early 16th century	15 March 1955	TQ1753911292; 50°53′21″N 0°19′49″W	1354081	61, 63 and 65 High Street More images
Mulberry House	Storrington and Sullington	House	18th century	15 March 1955	TQ0879014320; 50°55′05″N 0°27′13″W	1027235	Mulberry House More images
The parish church of St Mary the Virgin	Storrington	Parish church	Medieval	15 March 1955	TQ0860314079; 50°54′57″N 0°27′23″W	1027264	The parish church of St Mary the Virgin More images
West Wantley Farmhouse	Storrington and Sullington	Farmhouse	1656	15 March 1955	TQ0900015469; 50°55′42″N 0°27′01″W	1027238	West Wantley Farmhouse More images
The Blue Idol Meeting House and Guest House	Coolham, Shipley	Quaker meeting house	1931	15 March 1955	TQ1073923125; 50°59′49″N 0°25′24″W	1181144	The Blue Idol Meeting House and Guest House More images
Church of St Andrew	Edburton, Upper Beeding	Church	13th century	15 March 1955	TQ2330511498; 50°53′23″N 0°14′54″W	1354065	Church of St Andrew More images
The parish church of St Peter	Upper Beeding	Parish church	14th century	15 March 1955	TQ1928211134; 50°53′15″N 0°18′20″W	1027214	The parish church of St Peter More images
Sands	Warnham	House	Mid-16th century	22 September 1959	TQ1518234447; 51°05′52″N 0°21′23″W	1181536	Upload Photo
South east lodges of Warnham Court School	Warnham	Arch	1828	22 September 1959	TQ1647632479; 51°04′47″N 0°20′19″W	1354221	South east lodges of Warnham Court School
The parish church of St Mary	Washington	Parish church	12th century	15 March 1955	TQ1187512860; 50°54′16″N 0°24′37″W	1027198	The parish church of St Mary More images
Glebe House	West Grinstead	House	Modern	22 September 1959	TQ1719420694; 50°58′25″N 0°19′56″W	1026846	Glebe House
Old Lock Farmhouse	Lock, West Grinstead	Farmhouse	1702	15 March 1955	TQ1776918455; 50°57′13″N 0°19′29″W	1353982	Upload Photo
Priest's House	West Grinstead	House	Early 18th century	22 September 1959	TQ1769021166; 50°58′40″N 0°19′30″W	1026840	Priest's House More images
The parish church of St Mary	Wiston Park, Wiston	Parish church	14th century	15 March 1955	TQ1553812393; 50°53′58″N 0°21′30″W	1027150	The parish church of St Mary More images
The stables to the south east of Wiston House	Wiston Park, Wiston	Stables	16th century	9 May 1980	TQ1553012376; 50°53′58″N 0°21′31″W	1182674	Upload Photo
The parish church of St Peter	Woodmancote	Parish church	13th century	15 March 1955	TQ2311715002; 50°55′17″N 0°14′59″W	1284248	The parish church of St Peter More images
Chesworth House	Horsham	Farmhouse	Late 15th to early 18th century	22 September 1959	TQ1761329476; 51°03′09″N 0°19′24″W	1027063	Chesworth House More images
Horsham Museum	Horsham	House	19th century	20 May 1949	TQ1720230451; 51°03′41″N 0°19′44″W	1027542	Horsham Museum More images
Horsham Park	Horsham	House	Early 18th century	20 May 1949	TQ1761730864; 51°03′54″N 0°19′22″W	1353938	Horsham Park More images
Netherledys the Needles	Horsham	Timber-framed house	15th or 16th century	20 May 1949	TQ1655130138; 51°03′32″N 0°20′18″W	1027571	Netherledys the Needles
North Chapel	Horsham	Farmhouse	16th century (probably)	20 May 1949	TQ1776830862; 51°03′54″N 0°19′14″W	1192026	North Chapel More images
Springfield Park	Horsham	Country house	18th century	20 May 1949	TQ1714331192; 51°04′05″N 0°19′46″W	1286838	Springfield Park
St John's College	Horsham	Country house	1833–35	22 September 1959	TQ1951829649; 51°03′14″N 0°17′46″W	1027055	St John's College
St Leonards	Horsham	Country house	Early 19th century	22 September 1959	TQ2008530986; 51°03′56″N 0°17′15″W	1354200	St Leonards More images
The Manor House	Horsham	Manor house	1704	20 May 1949	TQ1714430460; 51°03′42″N 0°19′47″W	1286966	The Manor House More images

== Mid Sussex ==
Name	Location	Type	Completed	Date designated	Grid ref. Geo-coordinates	Entry number	Image
Albourne Place and former stables	Albourne	Country house	Mid-17th century	11 May 1983	TQ2524915995; 50°55′47″N 0°13′09″W	1192229	Albourne Place and former stables More images
Ditton Place and attached terrace wall and sandstone wall	Staplefield	Country house	1904	4 February 2003	TQ2844129795; 51°03′11″N 0°10′08″W	1096143	Ditton Place and attached terrace wall and sandstone wall More images
Stables to the north east of Wakehurst Place	Ardingly	Stables	18th century	28 October 1957	TQ3397031461; 51°04′01″N 0°05′22″W	1354792	Upload Photo
Balcombe Place	Balcombe	Country house	1856	26 April 1977	TQ3234529042; 51°02′44″N 0°06′48″W	1025775	Balcombe Place More images
Edmund's Farmhouse	Balcombe	Farmhouse	16th century (wing added)	28 October 1957	TQ3249230381; 51°03′27″N 0°06′39″W	1193049	Edmund's Farmhouse More images
Kemp's House	Balcombe	Farmhouse	Late 17th century	28 October 1957	TQ3082329582; 51°03′03″N 0°08′06″W	1192986	Kemp's House More images
Ouse Valley Viaduct	Balcombe	Railway viaduct	1841	11 May 1983	TQ3226227952; 51°02′09″N 0°06′54″W	1366101	Ouse Valley Viaduct More images
Wykehurst Park	Bolney	Apartment	1983	11 May 1983	TQ2577024405; 51°00′19″N 0°12′32″W	1193325	Wykehurst Park More images
St John the Evangelist's Church	Burgess Hill	Parish church	1861–63	22 April 1950	TQ3120519200; 50°57′26″N 0°08′00″W	1025854	St John the Evangelist's Church More images
Cuckfield Park	Cuckfield	Country house	c. 1574	10 September 1951	TQ2975524416; 51°00′16″N 0°09′07″W	1025541	Cuckfield Park More images
Gatehouse to Cuckfield Park including iron railings	Cuckfield	Gatehouse	Early 19th century	10 September 1951	TQ2981424398; 51°00′16″N 0°09′04″W	1025545	Gatehouse to Cuckfield Park including iron railings More images
Marshalls	Cuckfield	House	1987	10 September 1951	TQ3043424692; 51°00′25″N 0°08′32″W	1025522	Upload Photo
Ockenden Manor	Cuckfield	Manor house	Late 16th century	10 September 1951	TQ3026524656; 51°00′24″N 0°08′41″W	1025490	Ockenden Manor More images
The Sanctuary	Cuckfield	Cross wing house	19th century	11 December 1987	TQ3040924590; 51°00′21″N 0°08′34″W	1191932	Upload Photo
St Swithun's Church	East Grinstead	Parish church	14th to 15th century (origins)	28 January 1948	TQ3964638001; 51°07′27″N 0°00′21″W	1277758	St Swithun's Church More images
Clarendon House	East Grinstead	House	Modern	28 January 1948	TQ3946937946; 51°07′26″N 0°00′30″W	1277662	Clarendon House More images
Cromwell House	East Grinstead	Jettied house	19th century	28 January 1948	TQ3972837953; 51°07′26″N 0°00′17″W	1248867	Cromwell House More images
Imberhorne Farm Cottages	East Grinstead	House	Late 18th or early 19th century	25 June 2007	TQ3734738386; 51°07′42″N 0°02′19″W	1392066	Upload Photo
Old Stone House	Judges Terrace, East Grinstead	House	Late 16th century	28 January 1948	TQ3945537948; 51°07′26″N 0°00′31″W	1248939	Old Stone House More images
The Porch House	East Grinstead	House	17th century	28 January 1948	TQ3974137957; 51°07′26″N 0°00′16″W	1248868	The Porch House More images
Perching Manor Farmhouse	Fulking	Farmhouse	18th century	11 May 1983	TQ2435511434; 50°53′20″N 0°14′00″W	1354845	Perching Manor Farmhouse More images
Clayton Priory	Hassocks	House	c. 1820	28 January 1971	TQ3034617899; 50°56′45″N 0°08′45″W	1354811	Upload Photo
Clayton Windmills	Clayton	Windmills	Mid-19th century	28 October 1957	TQ3036613368; 50°54′18″N 0°08′50″W	1354812	Clayton Windmills More images
Ockley Manor	Keymer	House	Early 18th century	28 October 1957	TQ3156416368; 50°55′54″N 0°07′45″W	1285397	Upload Photo
Butlers Green House	Haywards Heath	Apartment	1987	10 September 1951	TQ3195823961; 51°00′00″N 0°07′15″W	1192341	Upload Photo
St Wilfrid's Church	Haywards Heath	Parish church	1863–65	10 September 1951	TQ3309823915; 50°59′57″N 0°06′17″W	1354934	St Wilfrid's Church More images
Hospital Farmhouse	Haywards Heath	Farmhouse	Mid-16th century	6 April 1976	TQ3398122513; 50°59′11″N 0°05′33″W	1025468	Upload Photo
Lucas's	Haywards Heath	House	Early 19th century	10 September 1951	TQ3260524459; 51°00′15″N 0°06′41″W	1025471	Upload Photo
Sunte House	Haywards Heath	House	1700	10 September 1951	TQ3338125519; 51°00′49″N 0°06′00″W	1192455	Upload Photo
Wickham Farmhouse	Haywards Heath	Farmhouse	Late 19th century	10 September 1951	TQ3325025432; 51°00′46″N 0°06′07″W	1286539	Wickham Farmhouse
Broadhurst Manor including attached walls to east and west	Horsted Keynes	House	Part-demolished c. 1780	28 October 1957	TQ3876730044; 51°03′11″N 0°01′17″W	1025683	Broadhurst Manor including attached walls to east and west More images
Cobbs Mill	Hurstpierpoint and Sayers Common	Watermill	19th century	11 May 1983	TQ2743718976; 50°57′22″N 0°11′13″W	1180397	Cobbs Mill More images
Littlepark Farmhouse	Hurstpierpoint and Sayers Common	Farmhouse	Early to mid-17th century	28 October 1957	TQ2834216602; 50°56′05″N 0°10′30″W	1180570	Upload Photo
Holy Trinity Church	Hurstpierpoint	Parish church	1860s	28 October 1957	TQ2795616498; 50°56′01″N 0°10′50″W	1354863	Holy Trinity Church More images
Barnlands	Lindfield	Jettied house	Late 16th or early 17th century	10 September 1951	TQ3474025618; 51°00′51″N 0°04′50″W	1354963	Barnlands More images
Lindfield House	Lindfield	House	Early 18th century	10 September 1951	TQ3497425939; 51°01′01″N 0°04′38″W	1193499	Lindfield House More images
Lindfield Place	Lindfield	House	Mid-18th century	10 September 1951	TQ3495425984; 51°01′03″N 0°04′39″W	1025452	Lindfield Place More images
Malling Priory	Lindfield	House	c. 1730	10 September 1951	TQ3478825617; 51°00′51″N 0°04′48″W	1025459	Malling Priory More images
All Saints Church	Lindfield	Parish church	c. 1300	10 September 1951	TQ3488825850; 51°00′58″N 0°04′42″W	1025462	All Saints Church More images
The Bower House	Lindfield	House	c. 1300	10 September 1951	TQ3484925802; 51°00′57″N 0°04′44″W	1025448	The Bower House More images
The Manor House	Lindfield	House	18th century	11 December 1987	TQ3470125570; 51°00′49″N 0°04′52″W	1025483	The Manor House More images
The Mansion House	Hurstpierpoint	House	16th century	28 October 1957	TQ279165; 50°55′59″N 0°10′38″W	1354864	The Mansion House More images
The Thatched Cottage	Lindfield	Timber-framed house	16th century	10 September 1951	TQ3495125908; 51°01′00″N 0°04′39″W	1354974	The Thatched Cottage More images
West Wing Middle House, East Wing Turret House and Archway Cottage at Old Place	Lindfield	House	1884	10 September 1951	TQ3496025888; 51°01′00″N 0°04′38″W	1025426	West Wing Middle House, East Wing Turret House and Archway Cottage at Old Place More images
Wincote	Lindfield	House	1907	10 September 1951	TQ3468925491; 51°00′47″N 0°04′53″W	1192816	Wincote More images
122 High Street	Lindfield	House	Early 19th century	10 September 1951	TQ3488625808; 51°00′57″N 0°04′42″W	1193272	122 High Street More images
East Mascalls	Lindfield Rural	House	15th century (origins)	28 October 1957	TQ3660825673; 51°00′51″N 0°03′14″W	1025621	East Mascalls More images
Little Walstead Farmhouse	Lindfield Rural	Farmhouse	16th century	28 October 1957	TQ3565725036; 51°00′31″N 0°04′04″W	1354878	Little Walstead Farmhouse
St John Evangelist's Church	Newtimber	Parish church	Medieval	28 October 1957	TQ2713213389; 50°54′22″N 0°11′36″W	1354879	St John Evangelist's Church More images
St Mary's Church	Slaugham	Parish church	Medieval	28 October 1957	TQ2573728074; 51°02′18″N 0°12′29″W	1025603	St Mary's Church More images
The ruins of Old Slaugham Place in the grounds of Slaugham Manor	Slaugham, Slaugham	Kitchen	Remains	28 October 1957	TQ2603927837; 51°02′10″N 0°12′14″W	1354891	The ruins of Old Slaugham Place in the grounds of Slaugham Manor More images
Hickstead Place	Hickstead, Twineham	House	Early 17th century (addition)	28 October 1957	TQ2679720004; 50°57′56″N 0°11′45″W	1181866	Hickstead Place More images
Slipe	Twineham	Farmhouse	Early 15th century	28 October 1957	TQ2566020037; 50°57′58″N 0°12′43″W	1025584	Slipe More images
Priest House	West Hoathly	House	1908 (restored)	28 October 1957	TQ3624732509; 51°04′33″N 0°03′23″W	1025556	Priest House More images
The Manor House	West Hoathly	House	16th century	28 October 1957	TQ3627432573; 51°04′35″N 0°03′22″W	1025554	The Manor House More images
Tickeridge	West Hoathly	Jettied house	Late 14th century	28 October 1957	TQ3651935552; 51°06′11″N 0°03′05″W	1182345	Tickeridge
Crabbet Park	Crabbet Park, Worth	Apartment	1983	27 September 1962	TQ3066637365; 51°07′14″N 0°08′04″W	1025535	Upload Photo
Rowfant House	Worth	Country house	15th century	28 October 1957	TQ3249037147; 51°07′06″N 0°06′30″W	1354912	Rowfant House More images
The tennis court and orangery at Crabbet Park	Crabbet Park, Worth	Orangery	c. 1900	11 May 1983	TQ3054737363; 51°07′14″N 0°08′10″W	1025536	Upload Photo

== Worthing ==
Name	Location	Type	Completed	Date designated	Grid ref. Geo-coordinates	Entry number	Image
Beach House	Worthing	House	1820	3 August 1948	TQ1544902653; 50°48′43″N 0°21′46″W	1025808	Beach House More images
Beckets Cottage and Parsonage Row	West Tarring	House	15th century	11 October 1949	TQ1324204061; 50°49′30″N 0°23′37″W	1250338	Beckets Cottage and Parsonage Row
Christ Church	Worthing	Parish church	1843	11 October 1949	TQ1467402783; 50°48′48″N 0°22′25″W	1250242	Christ Church More images
St Andrew's Church	West Tarring	Parish church	Late 13th century	11 October 1949	TQ1309704017; 50°49′29″N 0°23′44″W	1354775	St Andrew's Church More images
St Mary's Church	Goring-by-Sea	Parish church	1837	11 October 1949	TQ1108702677; 50°48′47″N 0°25′28″W	1250239	St Mary's Church More images
St Paul's Church	Worthing	Redundant church	1812	11 October 1949	TQ1481802837; 50°48′49″N 0°22′18″W	1250172	St Paul's Church More images
Dovecote to south of the Old Palace	West Tarring, Worthing	Dovecote	Pre-1250	1 September 1975	TQ1327303989; 50°49′28″N 0°23′35″W	1250619	Upload Photo
Lodges and gateway to Park Crescent	Worthing	Triumphal arch		11 October 1949	TQ1436702811; 50°48′49″N 0°22′41″W	1250471	Lodges and gateway to Park Crescent More images
Desert Quartet sculpture and loggia, Montague Centre	Worthing	Loggia	1989	11 May 2007	TQ1482102517; 50°48′39″N 0°22′18″W	1391960	Desert Quartet sculpture and loggia, Montague Centre More images
Dome Cinema	Worthing	Cinema	1911	31 May 1989	TQ1506002486; 50°48′38″N 0°22′06″W	1250850	Dome Cinema More images
1–14 Park Crescent	Worthing	House	1830	11 October 1949	TQ1430102892; 50°48′52″N 0°22′44″W	1250470	1–14 Park Crescent More images

== See also ==
- Grade I listed buildings in West Sussex
- Listed buildings in Worthing
