= Royal West Sussex Hospital =

Former hospital in West Sussex, England

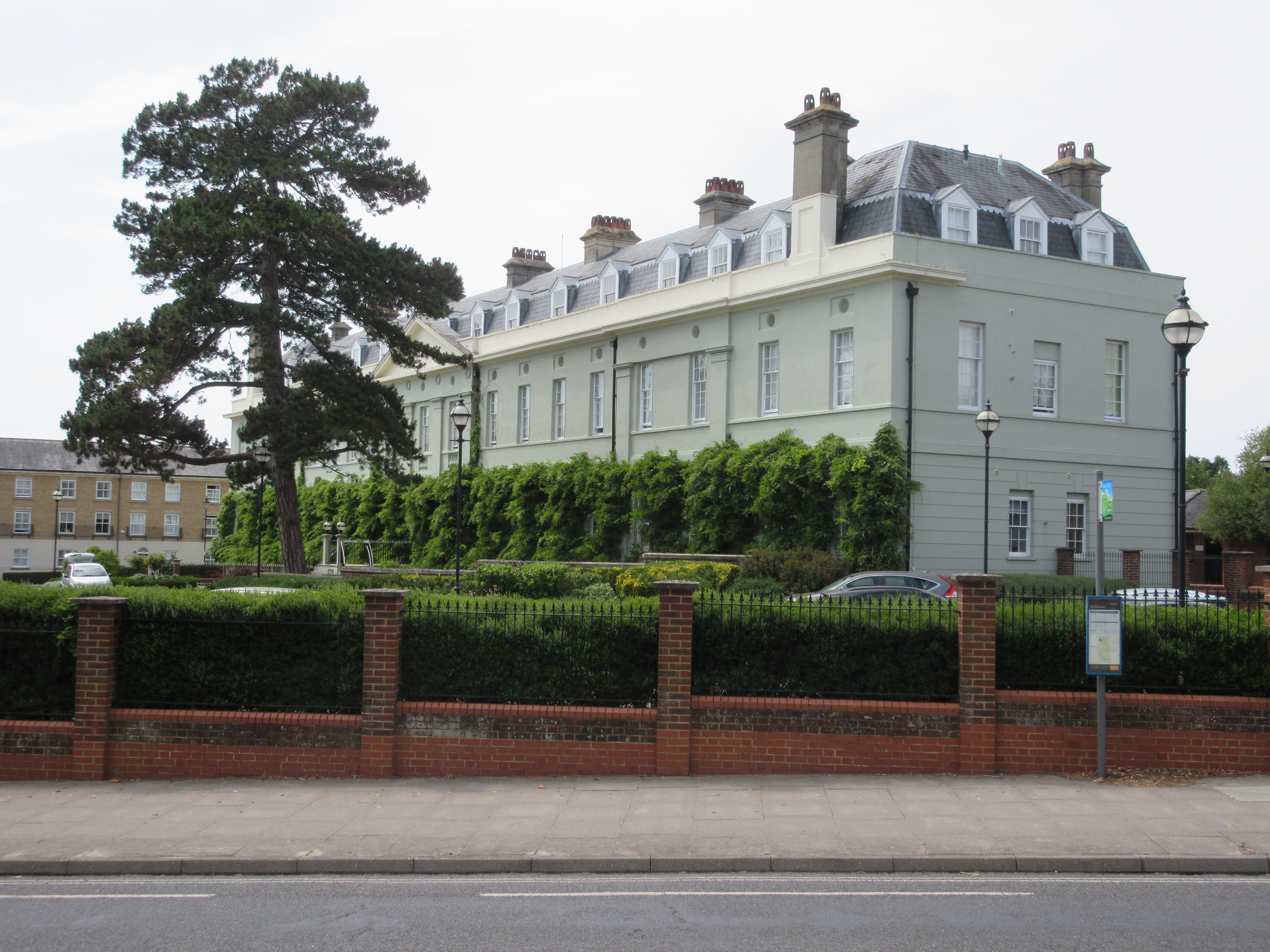
- Royal West Sussex Hospital in 2022

- Location within West Sussex

General information
- Location: Chichester, West Sussex, England
- Coordinates: 50°50′37.07″N 0°46′48.76″W
- Year built: 1825

Design and construction
- Architect: George Draper

Listed Building – Grade II*
- Official name: The Royal West Sussex Hospital
- Designated: 8 October 1971
- Reference no.: 1354267

The Royal West Sussex Hospital is a former hospital and Grade II* listed building in Chichester, West Sussex, England.

== History ==
In 1784 the Reverend William Walker and Dr Thomas Sanden established the Chichester Dispensary.

The main building was constructed in 1825, based on designs by George Draper. Originally a two-storey, stucco-faced neoclassical block, the building was expanded during the 1830s and 1860s, and underwent reconstruction in 1912–13 under the direction of C. W. Ball and Dr. D. J. Mackintosh. At that time, a small, single-storey brick unit for out-patients and casualty services was also added. It was renamed the Royal West Sussex Hospital in 1913. Subsequent additions included a nurses' home and a private patients' block, built in 1928–29 and extended around 1933, along with a group of four Emergency Medical Service (EMS) ward huts.

During the 1940 Battle of Britain, the hospital treated wounded servicemen.

The building was Grade II* listed on 8 October 1971.

The hospital remained in use into the early 1990s, but following a period of financial difficulty, it was closed in 1995. The building was subsequently sold to a property developer, who converted it into residential flats, now known as Forbes Place, located within the grounds of King George Gardens.

== Notable staff ==
Anne Sarah Parsons (1876–1948) was matron from 1916 until about 1925. Parsons trained at The London Hospital under Eva Luckes between 1905–1907. After her training Parsons trained as a midwife, and worked as a holiday sister and ward sister at The London. In 1912 she was appointed matron of the Jessop Hospital in Sheffield for four years before she moved to Chichester.

== See also ==
- Grade II* listed buildings in West Sussex
