= Ecclesden Manor =

Listed building in West Sussex, England

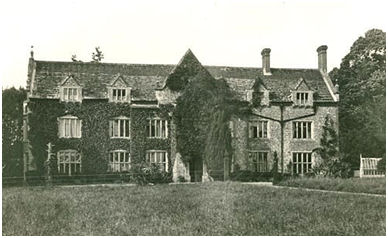
- Ecclesden Manor in 1910

- Location within West Sussex

General information
- Location: Angmering, West Sussex, England
- Coordinates: 50.8288°N 0.4703°W
- Year built: 1634

Listed Building – Grade II*
- Official name: Ecclesden Manor
- Designated: 12 October 1954
- Reference no.: 1027679

Ecclesden Manor is a Grade II* listed country house in Angmering, West Sussex, England. It was built for John Forster in 1634.

== History ==
Ecclesden Manor was first recorded in 1324. It was a brick-and-flint medieval building, which originally had a solar parlour and large hall. It was rebuilt in the 15th century. John Palmer (d. 1563) was an early lord of the manor, having 200 acres (81 ha) and Ecclesden Windmill as part of the estate. A Dutch gable was added between 1620 and 1700. R.W. Davis says that, "There is a tradition that John Foster rebuilt the house in 1634, but the basis for this is dubious". John Baker acquired the land and farm after Palmer died, then in 1593 he bought the house; he probably kept and remodelled the original house. Baker married Eden Truelove, who died aged 23 in 1598. Her memorial brass is in the floor of Angmering Church. The Baker family owned Ecclesden Manor for around three generations. James Clark bought the house in 1700, and John Edsaw was living in it when he died in 1781. Thereafter, the house had various owners and tenants, as opposed to dynastic landowners. However, Historic England says that the house was built by John Forster in 1634.

== Ecclesden Windmill ==
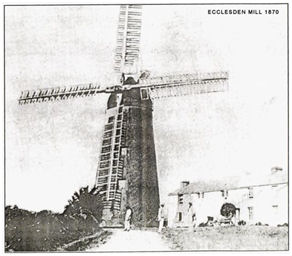
Ecclesden Mill, c. 1870

Ecclesden originally had a watermill, then the windmill is mentioned in documents from 1832. According to R.W. Davis, Baker probably bought it in 1582. The present mill was constructed in the 19th century, and was working until 1859. It has since lost its sails—around 1870—and has been converted into a house. It is not listed.

== See also ==
- Grade II* listed buildings in West Sussex
