= Clitherow =

Clitherow is an English surname, probably meaning a person from Clitheroe, and may refer to:

- Christopher Clitherow, Lord Mayor of London in 1635
- John Clitherow (1782 – 1852) British army officer active in Canada
- Margaret Clitherow (1556 – 1586) English saint
- Nicholas Clitherow, Bishop of Bangor 1424 to 1436
- Richard Clitherow (1902 – 1947) British politician
- Richard George Clitherow (1909 – 1984) British Anglican Bishop
