= Mansion House, Hurstpierpoint =

Coordinates: 50.933288°N 0.185339°W

Mansion House
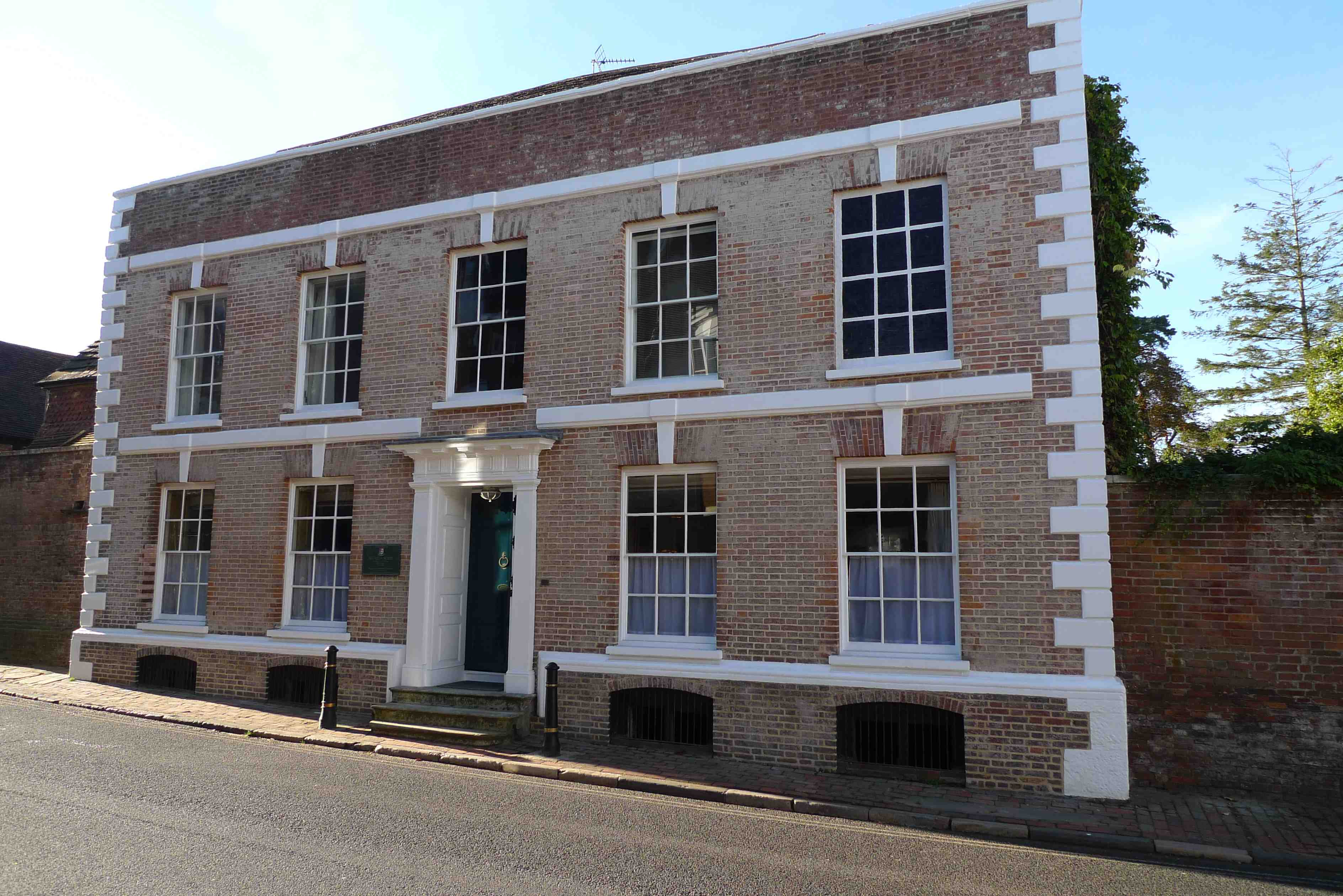
- Hurstpierpoint High Street

- Location within West Sussex
- OS grid reference: TQ279165
  - London: 39 miles (63 km) N
- Civil parish: Hurstpierpoint and Sayers Common
- District: Mid Sussex
- Shire county: West Sussex
- Region: South East
- Country: England
- Sovereign state: United Kingdom
- Post town: HASSOCKS
- Postcode district: BN6
- Dialling code: 01273
- Police: Sussex
- Fire: West Sussex
- Ambulance: South East Coast
- UK Parliament: Arundel and South Downs

Mansion House is a prominent and historically significant Grade II* listed Georgian village property in Hurstpierpoint, West Sussex, England. The substantial family home is situated in the heart of Hurstpierpoint with the High Street at the front and South Downs to the rear. The brick-faced, timber-framed building has surviving medieval sections dating back to the mid- to late 16th century.

Maggie Henderson, an historic buildings archaeologist, was commissioned to carry out a historic building survey of the grade II* Listed Mansion House, High Street, Hurstpierpoint, West Sussex. The report was commissioned to assess the origin and development of the property over time based on the surviving fabric of the building. As part of the project, a programme of documentary research was also carried out including an assessment of available historic maps.

== Scope and methodology ==
The principal elements of the survey involved the creation of a record and description of the historic building together with an analysis and interpretation of the building's origin and historic development.

The building was visited by Maggie Henderson in order to carry out the on-site recording work. Subsequent visits were made by the author accompanied by Jane Briscoe in the first instance and David and Barbara Martin of the Rape of Hastings Architectural Survey.

The survey, a visual, non-intrusive examination of the fabric comprised the compilation of a detailed description of the building supplemented by an internal and external digital photographic record including details of all surviving historic fabric, features, fixtures and fittings.

A set of measured outline survey drawings of the house, including plans, sections cross-sections were created.

As always, the findings are based on the extent of visible fabric at the date of inspection.

== Location, designations and planning considerations ==
=== Location ===
The Mansion House is situated on the south side of the High Street, towards the western end of the town. The house fronts onto the street, the east – west axis sitting parallel to the road with the principal, north elevation directly on the pavement. The property has large gardens to the rear bounded to the south by a Grade II Listed boundary wall of flint with brick trim. Access is directly from the pavement on the north side of the house.

=== Designations and planning considerations ===
The Mansion House is Grade II* Listed (List entry No. 1354864). The building was first listed on 28 October 1957 together with the adjacent cottage. The house was described as an early 17th-century front to a 17th-century or earlier timber-framed building: the north and west fronts are early 18th century. The wall to the northwest and that to the south of the property are listed in their own right, as is the tower house.

Any structure attached to a listed building or within its curtilage is subject to listed building control, by virtue of S. 1(5) of the Planning (Listed Buildings and Conservation Areas) Act 1990 (formerly S. 54(9)).

Any object or structure within the curtilage of a principal building which, although not fixed to the principal building, forms part of the land and has done so since before 1 July 1948 and which is treated as part of the principal building by virtue of section 1(5)(b) of the Act.

== Significance ==
The Mansion House is significant for the following reasons:

=== Date of construction, survival of historic fabric and features ===
The building is of composite construction with the earliest surviving fabric dating to the mid to late 16th century.

The historical value of the building lies in the mid to late 16th century origin, the surviving fabric of which gives clues to the form and decoration of the building from the outset. The house straddles the traditional and the fashionable: the house in its original form comprised a main range with the entrance leading into the hall in the medieval sense albeit a single-storey one. To the rear on the east side the house was served by an attached kitchen wing with a secondary solid staircase that remains in situ. To the west a further face wing may have been included from the outset to provide a parlour wing, although later alterations have obscured or removed clear evidence. The floor-plan then was in the traditional manner with the separate parts of the building serving specific functions: public, private and service, each accessed separately.

Another example of this duality is the use of combed daub at garret level in the main range of the house, at a date when the use of such a finish at this level of society was beginning to decline, contrasting with the inclusion of jointed-in collars intended to carry under-plastered ceilings within the garrets. The inclusion of under-plastered ceilings at this date was usually reserved for principal rooms and public spaces. At the Mansion House it appears that this newly fashionable and expensive feature was fitted throughout, including kitchen and garret.

=== Historic development ===
The 17th century modifications upgraded the building to include link corridors and a principal staircase situated within a new southern extension. By creating links between the pre-existing areas the building was entering the modern era, moving away from the traditional medieval roots. In the Georgian era, the house underwent significant alterations to again bring it in-line with current trends: the building was given a new front and west facade; indeed, the west side was all but rebuilt to create a high-end cross wing with good storey heights, well-appointed heated rooms and well-lit garret accommodation.

Subsequent alterations were fairly minimal resulting in an aesthetically pleasing building that can be ‘read’ to a high degree, indicating in its standing fabric its origin and development through some 450 years of occupation. The high-end features of the house, its size and location in relation to grounds and in the first instance, to ancillary buildings, indicate that the person responsible for the construction was one of wealth and status in the community.

=== Owners and occupants ===
By the second quarter of the 17th century it is known that the occupants, the Beard family were gentlemen, with careers in law. The Beard family remained at the house for at least 150 years, superseded by the Weeks, a wealthy medical family with substantial property holdings in Sussex in the 19th century. The Weekes remained at the house, and the house accommodated the medical profession until 1947, with one brief interlude between 1850 and 1853 when the Mansion House served as the school building for the newly created Hurst College prior to its relocation to the present purpose-built site.

== Historic background and maps ==
=== Historic background ===
The Mansion House in Hurstpierpoint dates to the last half of 16th century, clearly evidenced by the surviving standing historic fabric of the building which will be described in detail below. The historic documents examined as part of the project does not so far extend as far back as the building itself. The earliest observed reference concerning the occupant of the house dates to 1636 and notes that William Jordan was in residence. The 1636 document describing the extents of the Glebe Terrier notes that:

‘...abutting to the north ground of the same name of William Jordans, the south to the mansion house of the said William Jordan.’

Little information is available regarding William Jordan; however, it is clear that he had left the Mansion House by at least 1642 when the house is in the hands of the Beard family where it remained until the end of the 18th century. The Beard family were therefore responsible for much of the development of the building that has resulted in the present form, altering, adding and upgrading the property for over a 150 years.

The first Beard to occupy the property was Ralph Beard Esquire mentioned as of the Mansion House in a covenant of 1646. Ralph married Cassandra Wilson of Sheffield House, Fletching, in 1630, the only (surviving) daughter of Francis Wilson Esquire. Ralph, born in c. 1594 was the son of John Beard of Cowfold, Gent and Alice Alfrey. Ralph is listed as Ralph Beard Esquire, barrister at law, of the Inner Temple, London and Hurstpierpoint, Sussex and his descendants are described as living at Hurstpierpoint. Ralph Beard served as lawyer to Lord Goring of the nearby Danny Estate also in Hurstpierpoint.

After the death of Ralph Beard in 1655, the Mansion House passed to his descendants. Ralph and Cassandra had three sons: Thomas, John and Francis. It appears from subsequent records and surviving indications within the house that Thomas took up residence with documents to that effect dating from at least 1664. Thomas was named in 1682 as one of the members of a jury formed to inquire for the Lord King and the Body of the County (Assize records). By 1690 mention is also made of his son Thomas junior at Hurstpierpoint. The elder Thomas married for a second time in 1691 to a local woman, Elizabeth Minshull, spinster of Hurstpierpoint. Both Thomas Beards were resident at Hurstpierpoint by 1698 and the will of Thomas junior dated the following year (1699) names his wife Katherine Beard, née Stone (married in 1693) and their son, Ralph. Ralph Beard junior remains at the Mansion House and his initials are to be found in various places within the building, indicating that he too was responsible for the development of the property. Ralph is named as a 'Barrister at Law', indicating that he not only inherited his great-grandfather's name, but also followed the tradition of the family legal profession. Ralph Beard was responsible for commissioning the estate map of 1736 that indicates the amount of property held by him in Hurstpierpoint. Ralph Beard had five daughters with his wife Mary, whom he left a widow in 1754.

The daughters were named Mary (junior), Elizabeth, Martha, Sarah and Ann in a document dated to 1712. By 1719 Mary junior had married a Mr. George Parkes while her four sisters remained at Hurstpierpoint, described as spinsters in a conveyance dated 1767.

A book published in 2001 by the Hurstpierpoint Study Group list one William Sayers as occupier of the Mansion House in 1773, followed by John Sayers in 1787, no sources are given. The long residency of the Beard family comes to a close at the end of the 18th century making way for the next:

=== Weekes family ===
Letter No. 13 of the Weekes family dated 28 October 1801 gives a description of alterations taking place at the Mansion House. The reference appears to relate to repairs commissioned by Richard Weekes a doctor and apothecary then resident at Matts in Hurstpierpoint presumably while the work progressed. The relevant passage from the letter sheds light on the alterations noting that:

‘Mrs Beards house is repairing but goes on very slow, have put in new sashes, stopt up 2 in front and made a large window west end for a drawing room above stairs.

Both of Richard Weekes’ sons followed their father into a medical career, the elder of the two, Hampton Weekes returned to Hurstpierpoint to reside in the family home, Matts, purchased from his father for £1000. Richard Weekes is still listed as resident in Hurstpierpoint but if not at Matts, now occupied by his son, then where? It is possible then that Richard on his retirement had purchased the Mansion House, succeeded there by his younger son also Dick in 1833 upon his marriage to Mary Marshall.

Dick and his wife Mary had one son, Arthur, born at Hurstpierpoint in 1838. Arthur married Jessie Nelson Ward in 1888, whose grandmother was the daughter of Lord Nelson and Emma Lyon, producing eight children with her between 1888 and 1902. Arthur lived until the age of 78 (died in 1917), presumably spending much of that time as owner and occupier of the family home with one notable exception: the house was leased out two years after the death of Dick Weeks in 1847 to the newly formed Hurst College. It is unclear where his widow and son were resident at that time:

‘Mr Cressy has to let on lease unfurnished a most desirable freehold called the Mansion House, situate in the pleasant and healthy village of Hurstpierpoint... about one mile from the Hassocks Gate first class station of the Brighton Railway and near the Parish Church

The college relocated to the Mansion House from Shoreham on 28 January 1850, remaining there until July 1853. While in use by the college the top floor provided accommodation for servants and masters, the boys were accommodated in the first floor rooms, with Edward Lowe, the first headmaster, occupying the study at the front: teaching was conducted within the ground floor rooms. In April 1850, c.150 boys were moved from the Mansion House to the new school building, not including those that attended in a day school capacity.

After the house had ceased to serve as the school premises it was again occupied as a domestic dwelling. According to Alumni Oxonienses, Arthur Weekes of Hurstpierpoint matriculated at Exeter College, Oxford in 1857. It is assumed that the Weekes family were in residence by 1857 at the Mansion House as that address is given in the college register.

According to ‘Who’s Been Living at my House’ Hampton, Richard and George Weekes in practice as surgeons were at the house with Alfred Watts B. B. in 1861. The entry must be partly in error as Hampton Weeks died in 1855 at the age of 74.

However, the census of 1871 lists Alfred Watts in residence, this time as a General Practitioner, giving his age as 47. It is probable given additional information outlined below that Mary Weekes; Dick's widow remained at the house with her son, perhaps including Mr Watts as a lodger.

The remaining surgeons, Richard and George Weekes (the latter two were Hampton's sons) remained in practice at the Mansion House but were resident elsewhere. George resided at the former family home Matts from 1838 when he purchased it from his father for £995.00.

The Weekes family are certainly at the Mansion House by 1886 when the address is given by Arthur Weekes in membership to the Sussex Archaeological Society, an interest that he also shared with his father. The Weekes family are still in residence in 1891 with four servants, confirmed by the census records of that year. Arthur is recorded at this date as a retired Bengal civil service barrister and magistrate. Arthur and Jessie remained at the Mansion House, recorded as resident in the 1911 census. Arthur died in 1917 and Jessie inherited the property ostensibly until her death in 1952 whereby it was to pass to her eldest son (also Arthur).

Available sales particulars however indicate that the property was sold in 1947, purchased by Dr Esmond Millington for £10000. Jessie Nelson Weekes had remained at the property since her marriage to Arthur in 1888, a total of 59 years. At the date of sale, the property was offered as three lots: lot 1 included the house and grounds, all of the land between the house and the adjacent property New Inn and a southern ‘tongue’ of land that extended out to the west of the tower.

=== 20th century ===
Dr. Millington continued the legacy left by the Weekes dynasty by being a medical practitioner, albeit one with a practice held at a separate location from the Mansion House. The sales particulars prior to purchase by Millington record the house as comprising:

Ground Floor

Entrance hall: radiator and cupboards
Inner hall: French windows to garden
Drawing room: tiled fire place
Dining room: panelled walls, built in cupboards, serving hatch, brick fire place with oil painting over
West room: panelled, fireplace, French windows
Kitchen: Old Eagle range, Ideal boiler, cupboards
Scullery: fitted sink
Larder: fitted slate shelves, tiled
Staff room: fitted sink, kitchen range, copper, cupboards
Bath: fitted bath, WC

First Floor

Half-panelled landing, radiator
Bed: panelled, brick fireplace
Study: panelled
Bed: fitted Sussex grate
Bed: oak beams, built in cupboards, fireplace
Bed: panelled walls, cupboards, Sussex grate
Second staircase
Landing with fitted cupboards
Bath: fireplace
Separate WC

Garrets

Landing and cupboards
Bed: exposed beams, cupboards, fireplace
Bed
Bed: fireplace
Bed: exposed beams

2 Box rooms

Cellars

Cellars including wine store and coal store

External

Loggia
Stone built summerhouse
Garage and room over
Timber garage
Stable: two stalls, coach house with loft
Observation tower
Heated glasshouse

Vendor selling as tenant for life: title begins 1909, 2 codicils of testator d. 2 March 1917 (July 1947). It appears that Dr Millington purchased the entire property indicated by documents relating to the formation of his property company in 1958 (see below) that detail the sale of various separate parts of the former Weekes estate.

The Mansion House was Grade II* Listed on 28 October 1957 (List entry No. 1354864) together with the adjacent Mansion House Cottage.

The property was broken up into lots and the house was converted by Millington via Millington Properties Limited in 1958 to provide two principal flats and service accommodation. The sales particulars prepared by Day and Sons are undated but list the house as flats, as such they must relate to proposed sale post dating Millington's conversion. The work was commissioned by Dr Millington of Alec Feldman and Partners, Architects and Surveyors:

Ground Floor Flat:

Entrance from High Street to small porch enclosed by glass doors
Drawing room: half panelled, windows to street and gardens
Front bedroom: fully panelled, double-glazed, en-suite bathroom, built-in cupboard
Main bedroom: full length sash onto terrace and garden, raised ceiling, full panelling
Living room: kitchen of the original 1450 house. Tiled floor, half-timbered walls, large fireplace with two ovens and log cupboard.
Dining room: Window onto rear terrace, door to breakfast room
Breakfast room: access to kitchen and larder
Dressing room and bath (text obscured)

First Floor Flat (includes part of garret):

Entrance through side gardens and glazed lobby to the Jacobean staircase
Passage leading to front of flat
Study
Drawing room: large cupboard
Front Bedroom: en-suite, built in wardrobe
West bedroom: steps up, over the main bedroom of ground floor flat, fitted wash basin and cupboard, fully panelled
Dining room (opposite west bedroom): fully panelled, two cupboards
Kitchen
Breakfast room
Main bathroom: bath and WC and separate WC on landing on main stairway

‘Also in this flat is part of the second floor, reached through a doorway from passage leading to an internal upper stairway to landing from which access is gained to the central light-well and to the upper rooms which include..’:

Sewing room: window overlooking High Street, several built-in cupboards
Through dining room
Upper bedroom: window onto parapet and side lawn
Low Apple or Play room

Service Flat:

Rear of second floor, ‘entrance through doorway onto courtyard and up stairway to own front door adjacent to hot water tank cupboard...’
Bedroom: window onto side garden
Living Room: over dining room of first floor flat, tank room with tanks for central heating and hot water
Large kitchen and bathroom

Notes:

‘The two main flats are divided by a fire-proof partition at the base of the Jacobean staircase and if it is removed as has been done recently for ease of furniture removal the whole house is united...’

£80 000 Freehold

Conveyances and other related documents held by the present owner indicate that part of the property abutting the western boundary wall to the Mansion House gardens was sold in 1962 to Gwynne Printers Limited (19 December 1962)

A conveyance dated 13 October 1969 documents the sale of land and the Tower House (not to be confused with the actual tower) to Edith Ruth Moray. Tower Cottage to the southeast of Tower House was sold in 1975 to Florence Jane Williams and Mansion House Cottage sold the following year (September 1976) to Nicholas Stephen Cole all purchased from Millington Properties Limited.

The Millington's were still listed as in occupation of the Mansion House in 1977 in a letter from architects The David Bennis Partnership regarding repairs to the front parapet.

In 1978 Millington sold the Mansion House and additional lots to David and Aileen Scott. The house and grounds fetch £67500, while the additional lots are purchased at £15000. The sales particulars detailed above may relate to this transfer.

In 1996 the Scotts are listed as the owners of the Mansion House in the transference of title between the Scott's and the new purchasers (Simon and Morag Poole) dated 12 September of that year. The Scott's were in possession of the house and grounds, the property to the southwest and under Mrs Scott's name the bungalow to the west with its southern access rights.

Sales particulars for the Mansion House prepared by Humberts list the property as comprising the house with integral service flat. The particulars include details of the right of way between the hedge and the southern historic boundary of the Mansion House gardens created by David and Aileen Scott when they built the bungalow in 1979. The sales particulars list the accommodation as comprising:

Ground Floor:

Reception hall
Dining room (N)
Sitting room (N&W)
Drawing room (W)
Cloakroom
Living room (E)
Kitchen
Utility room
Sun room – accessed via half-landing of main staircase
Separate WC

First Floor:

Landing
Lobby
Bathroom 1
Bedroom 1 (E)
Bedroom 2 (N)
Study (N)
Bedroom 3 (N&W)
Bedroom 4 (W)

Second Floor (self-contained flat):

Hall
Sitting room (E)
Kitchen
Bathroom
Inner landing with doors to Bedroom 1 (W);
Bedroom 2 (W)

As noted, the Mansion House was sold in 1996 to Simon and Morag Poole at a purchase price of £250000.

=== 21st century ===
The Pooles remained in occupation until 16 July 2013 when the property was sold to the current owners. The house has regained the association with the medical profession that started in the early 19th century with the Weekes family, a tradition extending over a period of more than 180 years! The sales particulars for the transfer between the Poole and current owner indicate that the accommodation had been reunited recreating a single well proportioned family home.

=== Historic maps ===
The first available map is the estate map of Ralph Beard dated to 1736. The map shows extensive grounds and a number of properties under the ownership of Ralph Beard of the Mansion House who remained at the house until his death in 1754. The house is shown on the map in the correct location in relation to the gardens to the side and rear of the property. However, the depiction is as was often the case for early maps and plans, more symbolic than an actual representation of what was in situ at that date.

The map shows a single rectangular plan two-storey building oriented north – south and situated against the eastern property boundary. The house boasts two substantial chimney stacks on the western side of the building. The standing fabric of the Mansion House clearly indicates that the building was on the site long before the 1736 map was prepared and at that stage would have comprised an east – west oriented street front range and a rear kitchen wing (as a minimum) extending south from the eastern side of the principal wing. The 1736 depiction then clearly indicates some wealth and status for the property owner, but the house is intended to show location and importance over accurate representation in the manner of a map symbol.

=== By 1778 – 1783 ===
The Yeakell and Gardner map of Sussex shows the same general situation as that shown on the earlier estate map commissioned by Ralph Beard. The map shows the house in its present position within its own grounds, open fields to the west and south.

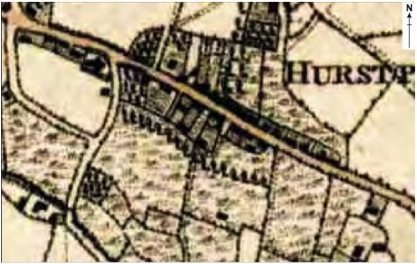
Yeakell and Gardner's Sussex 1778–1783, 2inch to 1 mile

=== By 1841 ===
By the issue of the Hurstpierpoint Tithe map in 1841 the scale is sufficient to determine the footprint of the building at this date and the development of the grounds in relation to Hurstpierpoint as a whole. The house is shown (domestic buildings in red) with its rear and eastern extensions and additions. Several small subsidiary buildings (in grey) are situated against the eastern and southern boundaries: the former undeveloped land to the west has acquired several farm buildings arranged around a courtyard and a small area to the south of the farm has been developed to include domestic and subsidiary structures.

The eastern side of the property shows the canted corner of what is now Mansion Cottage extending between the eastern elevation of the house and the gated access. The yard accessed by the gate extends down past the house to a larger enclosure with a pond and assorted subsidiary buildings that undoubtedly including stable and coach house facilities. The Tithe apportionment that accompanies the map lists Richard Weekes as owner and occupier.

=== By 1874 ===
By the issue of the first edition Ordnance Survey map in 1874 the property has reverted to its original and intended domestic function. As noted above the house is occupied by Dick Weekes widow Mary and their son Arthur, and the premises still accommodates the medical practice, run by two of Hampton Weekes sons and a colleague.

The house has gained glazed extensions abutting the southern side of the house and earlier extension and a water pump is shown to the east of the house. The gardens are shown with mature trees on the western side and a series of paths circling the boundaries and the building. A long linear portion of the garden on the western side of the grounds has been separated off from the remainder by a new north – south aligned boundary, against which on the eastern side, the path circling the gardens continues. The annexed area, extending the full length of the property from the High Street to the lane on the south perimeter has been laid out with paths and trees: no domestic buildings are shown and no clear access between the gardens of the Mansion House proper and the newly defined area.

On the eastern side of the gardens, the southern yard and subsidiary structures are still shown albeit altered where they abut the adjacent property (New Inn). The pond is no longer in situ, where it had been situated a building or has been erected with grounds to the south. The round tower has been added to the site; indicating that it was constructed between the publications of the Tithe map in 1841 and the first edition Ordnance Survey map in 1874. By 1888, on his marriage to Jessie Nelson Ward, Arthur Weekes resides at the property where he starts his own family.

=== 1897 – 1977 ===
The first revision Ordnance Survey map shows the house in the same layout including the glazed southern extensions. The yard to the southeast of the house has lost the laid out gardens and the tower is shown in isolation. The separate enclosure on the west side of the gardens has also lost its formal layout and only a single small rectangular structure is shown on the west side.

The 1910 edition Ordnance Survey map shows no significant changes although the pump is no longer indicated to the east and the boundary to the west is less well-defined. By the issue of the third revision map in 1937 the glazed southern extensions have been removed, and a small roofed lean-to added. The footprint of the eastern of the two glazed buildings appears to have been retained as a level platform.

The 20th century ordnance survey maps show no changes to the house and gardens although Hurstpierpoint can clearly be seen to be expanding, with new buildings constructed within formerly open areas, particularly to the west and south of Mansion House property. The house is no longer in the hands of the Weekes family having been sold by Jessie in 1947 to Dr. Millington. Dr Millington remains at the property until 1979 and the house has a fairly short interlude in the hands of the Scott's who are involved in property development and design: the Mansion House is no longer associated with the medical profession. The house as noted above, changes hands again in 1996, purchased by the Poole's who in turn sell it to the present owners.

== Overview – sequence of development ==
=== Phase 1 – about 1575 ===
Although it is not known who initiated the construction of what was to become the Mansion House, it is clear from the size, the surviving fabric and the status of the subsequent owners that the house was built by persons of wealth and social status.

The earliest surviving fabric within the Mansion House is stylistically datable to the second half of the 16th century. The house has both transitional and traditional features. By combining fashionable with traditional those responsible for commissioning the construction of the building were making a statement: that they were aware of current trends and financially able to include them at the same time as incorporating finishes that reinforced their ties to tradition, rooting them into the community within which this new building was constructed.

The house was large and well proportioned, served by subsidiary buildings within the property as a whole. The house from the outset would have been run with staff some of which would have been given accommodation on site (house-keeper, nurse-maid), others that would have come in on a daily basis from the village, and still others that would have been drafted in seasonally as required to undertake specific tasks. Further accommodation may have been available above the stables or coach house that would have been part of the property from the outset.

==== Layout ====
The house comprised a main range fronting onto the High Street, the main thoroughfare of Hurstpierpoint. The principal range was supplemented at this stage by a rear attached kitchen and service wing on the east side. To the west there are timber framed elements that indicate either an early addition or indeed a further original face-wing that would have contributed to a U-plan rather than L-plan footprint for the original house, providing a parlour wing, the three parts together providing public, private and service facilities in the traditional manner.

Although evidence is somewhat fragmentary for the inclusion of a west wing from the outset, the present interpretation leans towards it: material similarities in addition to early alterations during Phase 2 indicate that something had been situated in this location whether it was an original two storey plus garrets wing to match that on the eastern side, or something of lesser proportions is unknown.

Such U-plan footprints are known elsewhere in Sussex often comprising elements of earlier buildings that with added wings result in a U-plan format. A good example of a U-plan house of similar status is Ham Place, Burwash that started off in the 15th century as a U-plan building with substantial phases of alteration. Much of the alteration is attributable to John Butler Esquire in the late 1690s prior to his purchase of the rural mansion of Batemans. At the Mansion House, the remains of the Phase 1 building survive well within the east wing where the timber framed wall and roof construction, the large kitchen fireplace and service staircase remains extant. The principal range however has lost much of its original fabric being particularly susceptible as a street front property to modernisation and alteration in-line with changing fashions. The remains on the west side of the building have been subject to a greater degree of alteration particularly in 1743 that included re-building the west side of the house to a cross-wing under a single continuous staggered butt-purlin roof (discussed below).

The rebuilding caused difficulties in determining if there had been a west wing from the outset and if so what form this might have taken. In contrast, there is enough surviving fabric of the main range and east wing to show that these had been two and a half storeys in height; the half storey refers to the low side walls of the garrets, much of the storey heights of which were accommodated within the roof space, with the trusses constructed accordingly. The house included cellar facilities under the main range accessed via a short flight of stairs from the kitchen within the east wing.

==== Main Range – Ground Floor ====
At the Mansion House, the layout of the ground floor of the Phase 1 building comprised two principal rooms within the main range: Hall and Parlour. The hall at this date was a large room in the medieval sense rather than the fairly small entrance hall that we would refer to now. The room was a public one with occupants and visitors arriving directly into it via a cross-passage.

The entrance to the house would have opened into the cross-passage, typically (but not exclusively) situated at the low-end of the hall, being either part of the hall or separated from it by a full or partial partition. Due to later work, there are no extant remains indicating the location of the entrance, cross passage or indeed which of the two rooms had been the hall.

It is however possible to suggest that the opposing entrances one in the north and the other in the south wall were situated to the west side of the rear service wing, or indeed between the two rear wings if there had indeed been a contemporary west range from the outset.

The remainder of the main range usually comprised a private parlour in addition to the hall and cross-passage. All three parts of the main range would have extended across the full width of the building. The room to the east of the main range was a heated one, served by the substantial Phase 1 chimney stack shared with the service (east) wing. Although there is a stack in the same location at the western side of the house it is not clear due to surface finishes if this was original or later and the extant brickwork above the roof line is suggestive of a later date whether as a result of a rebuild or historic insertion is unclear. Due to the confirmed presence of the Phase 1 stack on the eastern side of the house, the room within the main range served by it will be referred to as the hall, the western counterpart as the parlour. In general terms, if there was only one heated principal room within a vernacular building of this date other than the kitchen it was usually the hall.

==== Upper Floors ====
The upper floor of the main range comprised a heated chamber over the hall, served by the same ornate stack as the hall and kitchen. Due to alterations it is not clear if there were one or two chambers in the remainder of the range. At garret level, the surviving fabric indicates that there had been two connected garret rooms, one accessed from the other by means of a doorway in the partition truss between the two. The garrets were both embellished by combed daub decoration and suspended ceilings supported over collars integral to the roof construction.

Both daub and ceiling details indicate the wealth and status of the owner. The presence of an under-plastered ceiling at garret level in the mid to late 16th century is an uncommon feature even at gentry level and would be considered highly significant for the home of a yeoman. The combed daub decor was by this date becoming a little old-fashioned but may have been included as a matter of personal preference or to create a sense of ‘place’ within the community in contrast to finishes befitting a ‘new’ build.

==== Access ====
The means of access between the floors within the main range have been obscured or lost through later alterations. The original Phase 1 service staircase remains to the rear of the east wing but has no counterpart within the principal wing. The roof construction over the main range has either surviving fabric or evidence for purlins that extended across the full length of the house in its original format. The inclusion of such continuous horizontal members indicates that no stair turret could have been included at the rear of the house to allow access to the upper floors and garrets as this would have been severely impeded by the purlin height. An alternative means of access may have been situated within the west end of the house, accessed directly from the parlour.

==== Service Wing ====
The service wing is a face wing extending out from the south side of the main range to the east side of the house. The wing included an attached kitchen of good proportions with a substantial cooking fireplace that is retained in situ albeit slightly altered by the insertion of ovens in the late 18th/19th century.

In the northeast corner of the kitchen beside the fireplace was the original cellar access (Appendix 5). The cellars are situated below the main range providing suspended floors to the ground floor rooms which would have kept them well aired and dry. By locating the access to the cellars in the kitchen, efficient use could be made of the items stored therein, bringing produce up to the kitchen for processing and food preparation without disturbing the other inhabitants of the house (namely the owners and family as the kitchen was undoubtedly served by staff).

The south end of the wing includes the original solid tread service staircase. The staircase connects all floors in this location (with the exception of the cellars).

Modernisation of the building has resulted in a loss of detail regarding the layout of the service rooms that would have supplemented the facilities of the kitchen within the original house. The modern finishes at ground floor level include a suspended ceiling, as such earlier material may survive above that could indicate room divisions.

The usual format of service accommodation in the medieval and transitional periods comprised two un-heated service rooms: a buttery for wet goods and a pantry for dry goods. However, as ample cellar storage facilities were included in the layout of the house, it is worth noting that alternatives were possible. Such alternatives include dairies, bake or brew-houses, back-kitchens and indeed subsidiary accommodation for staff. Many of the alternative functions would require the inclusion of chimneystacks for fireplaces and coppers.

==== Upper Floors ====
The first floor of the service wing comprises two chambers and the continuation of the solid tread staircase. The kitchen chamber at the north end of the wing has been fitted out during later historic phases of alteration obscuring detail.

The garrets of the east wing comprise a large north room, the storey height of which includes much of the roof over the range. Two small rooms are situated at the south end of the wing; both have modern finishes again obscuring much of the earlier fabric. Between south and north rooms lies the continuation of the Phase 1 staircase and a small lobby. In its original form, the garrets here may have been un-partitioned with the staircase opening out directly into the space. Such unheated rooms of this date and location, within the service wing, could serve as staff accommodation and/or storage facilities.

The present partitions within the service garrets may date to the late 17th century in the first instance, a time when corridors and lobbies were created to facilitate separate access to rooms rather than having to pass through one to get to the other in the traditional manner.

==== Cellars ====
The cellars are below the main range but are considered part of the service facilities and as such are included here. The cellars comprise fairly large well lit rooms on the north side of the house. The cellars were first accessed via the staircase at the eastern side of the kitchen fireplace. The main parts of the cellar were supplemented by storage areas to the south, some of which are vaulted and include brick built storage bays.

The floor of the cellar includes bricks and flagstones, with integral drainage channels. The provision of an easily cleaned durable surface was a necessary feature of areas with much traffic and those in use for supplementary household tasks. It is important to remember that everything necessary for the efficient running of a household was carried out on site: all food preparation, preservation and storage and all drinks. In addition, laundry, fuel storage (converted timber, coal), water storage, cleaning, ink-making, brewing, candle-making, cheese making, meat smoking, salting and a very many other tasks. Ample space was required to undertake the tasks and to prepare and store the items required. Alterations and additions were of course made over time and there is documentary evidence of improvements to the water management of the building in the mid-19th century.

==== Wall construction – Main Range ====
The original wall construction of the main range is for the most part lost through subsequent phases of development that replaced the original timber frame with a brick facade to the north and west. However, within the garret closet at the junction of the main range and east wing some wall construction remains in situ. The early remains comprise part of the south wall plate of the main range, part of the east wall plate of the east wing and a substantial post between the two. The lack of stave holes for in-fill on the soffit of the wall plate indicates that the two ranges are contemporary.

The tank within this garret cupboard is partially supported over the wall plate making access and visibility difficult. However, at the west side of the cupboard a wide plank-like brace can be seen extending down from the plate, presumably to the side girt (not seen), this was the only extant brace within the house.

==== Wall construction – East (Service) Wing ====
The wall construction of the east wing survives to a far greater extent than that of the main range. Tucked away to the rear of the house and performing a subsidiary function, the kitchen/service wing was out of the public eye and less susceptible to change.

The wing was of timber-frame construction and the in-fill was daub over an infrastructure of wide laths woven into staves fixed to stave-holes in the corresponding members of the timber frame. The daub finish was flush to the external walls of the building and much of this is visible within the house (for example: in the tank cupboard of the garret, to the rear of the east wing via a small cupboard at eaves level).

Construction comprised small panel framing with interrupted mid-rails formed by vertically set studs extending between the horizontal members (for example sill beam and side girt at ground floor level, visible in the west wall of the kitchen). The horizontal mid-rails were jointed between the studs (or between post and stud) creating panels. The panels were in-filled first with staves, then laths and the daub applied. No bracing is extant at this level although some may be concealed behind later finishes.

==== Wall construction – West Wing ====
It has been noted above that there may have been a west wing of some form from the outset and that some surviving material albeit rather ambiguous is visible within the western side of the house. The remains comprise a principal post at the rear of the main range, visible within the small closet. A side girt abuts this post but the relationship between the two is unclear. If the girt is jointed and pegged to the post it is more probable (though far from certain) that the two parts are contemporary. If the girt is notched into the post (with or without pegs), then it was more probably a secondary addition. Even if added at a later date, fabric at the southern end of this ‘wing’ is of the small panel framing type, similar to that in situ within the Phase 1 main range and east wing, suggesting that if not contemporary then the ‘wing’ was added fairly soon after the original construction.

The surviving timber framing at the south end of the west wing is included here as potentially part of the original house, but will also be included below due to the uncertainty of origin. In archaeological terms, relationships can only be ascertained with confidence if there is a physical link. Within the Mansion House there is no clearly visible extant link between the areas of surviving early fabric on the west side of the house. However, the similarity in materials can be interpreted as potential evidence for the inclusion of a contemporary west wing from the outset. The timber framed wall between the cloakroom and rear parlour is as noted, of small panel framing, the separate members jointed and double-pegged in place, stylistically very similar to the original Phase 1 remains but also to the early good quality alterations that will be discussed below.

==== Chimneys ====
The large chimney stack between main range and east (service) wing is of brick, very substantial and rather ornate above roof level. The stack may have been built as a three-flue one from the outset, but due to the level of historic alterations within the house, this could only be ascertained in the future by accessing the stack at roof level. Within the house it has been possible to establish that the kitchen and hall fireplaces are within this stack, and if it was of three flues, then the hall chamber is the probable third fireplace. As such the garret would not have been heated at the outset, a situation common in the mid to late 16th century, with, for the most part, only gentry level houses incorporating heated garrets at that date.

==== Windows and doorways ====
No windows of mid to late 16th century are extant, although surviving details may exist obscured by later work. One doorway location remains visible and this is incorporated into the construction of the service staircase: the post to the west of the first floor flight includes a rebate and pintles for the location of the original doorway: no door remains in situ.

==== Roof construction ====
Aside from the decorative finish retained within the garret rooms, the roof construction itself denotes the date of origin. The roof is of clasped side purlin construction with plank-like wind-braces rising from the principal rafters to the purlins. On the north side of the roof three robust trimmers indicate the location of gables that had adorned the original front of the house, a feature fashionable among the late 16th century elite. As the original walls are lost in this location the form that the gables had taken can only be suggested. Buildings of status that were constructed elsewhere in Sussex of a similar date to the Mansion House were often embellished with such details and examples are given here within Appendix 3 provided by David and Barbara Martin.

On the south side of the east bay of the roof there is a second, lower purlin, the only part of the roof with a second tier. The construction here is at the junction with the main range and its contemporary rear service wing, between which sits the original substantial brick-built chimney stack. The second purlin was intended to act as a trimmer for the stack, carrying the ends of the rafters where they were interrupted by the chimney stack construction and as such could not meet the wall plate in the usual manner.

The partition truss between the two main original garret rooms was specifically designed to include a doorway between the rooms indicating that the design of the house was created to include quality garret accommodation from the outset.

The partition truss comprises a pair of principal posts that are not linked in the standard way at wall plate level by a continuous tie-beam, rather the tie-beam is interrupted by a pair of vertically set studs (queen studs) into which the stub tie-beams are jointed and pegged. The studs form the jambs of the doorway between the rooms and are jointed at the base into an upper cross-beam that provided support for the original garret floor (and by extension, the ceiling of the chamber below). At the top, the studs are jointed into the collar that links, in the usual manner, the principal rafter pair.

The second unusual thing about the truss is the upper collar, noted above as jointed and pegged to the principal rafter pair of the truss and repeated between the common rafter pairs within the remainder of the Phase 1 roof to carry a suspended plaster ceiling.

Within the partition truss the combed daub panels are restricted to the areas below this upper collar as the apex would have been concealed by the ceiling. The doorway defined the queen studs has been in-filled due to changing floor levels but the head-beam remains in place together with the chamfer and stop detail to the jambs/posts. The eastern face of the partition truss has been re-finished concealing or removing the original details. However, glimpses of surviving material are retained below the stub tie-beam at the eaves on the north side of the roof.

==== Roof construction – East (Service) Wing ====
The roof over the east wing is broadly of the same type as that over the main range. The composition is one of clasped side purlin type with wind-braces and the only extant truss also includes tie-beams interrupted by (slightly angled) queen studs. The details are consistent with that of the main range but it is clear that less attention to the finished result and less expense was put into the construction of the subsidiary wing.

==== Decoration ====
Within the main range, the original east – west roof construction remains up to the rebuilt west end (discussed below). Within the main garrets the east end wall (with over-hanging gable) and the partition truss between the two rooms retain original finishes.

The finish is one of combed daub and this survives well on the west side of the partition truss. Elsewhere, the remains of the decorative finish, behind later work and below structural elements indicate that much if not all of the garret rooms were decorated in combed daub from the outset. Combed daub survives on the east projecting gable, overlain by later additions and below the stub tie-beam of the partition truss.

Incised comb decorative treatment of the daub in-fill of panels was reaching the end of its fashionable life towards the closing decades of the 16th century. The inclusion here therefore, particularly in conjunction with high-end new features (such as under-plastered ceilings throughout) is a fairly odd choice. The scheme may be due to personal taste or indeed to a desire to retain a connection with the traditions of the past by placing familiar ‘old’ finishes in a new building. Similar schemes of decoration were often included within public buildings such as courtrooms whereby the traditional design or technique was intended to reinforce traditional values and customs.

In the second half of the 16th century in buildings at the higher end of the social scale, existing houses were altered to include under-plastered ceilings to conceal the old fashioned exposed joists, or indeed incorporated into the design of ‘new’ builds. However, such a detail was more usually confined to the principal rooms such as parlour and main chamber. To include such a thing at garret level is indicative of status and wealth.

=== Phase 2 – 17th century ===
The second phase of construction is here separated into two parts; this is due to the extent of material within the building that could have been added at any stage within the 17th century, with no clearly defined datable material extant to refine the dating. The work may have been single phase, or added over several stages of modernisation. The 17th century work comprises the alterations to the south slope of the roof of the main range, to open it up and link it to a structure extending out in that location. As already noted, the building may have been the west wing of the original Phase 1 house but the remains are too elusive or fragmentary for a firm interpretation. As such, the building either in situ or added at this stage with changes in the south roof slope, extended to the present south end of the west wing, at the junction with the cloakroom under the stairs. The wall in this location is the retained timber framed one with small panels, the members jointed and pegged together in the same way as the Phase 1 fabric surviving within much of the east wing. The Phase 2b work comprises much of the interior ‘fitting out’ represented by the wainscoting schemes that occur throughout the building, by surviving two-panel doors and several other fittings and fixtures. Again, the interior decoration may have been single phase, or several stages, part of the programme that added or altered a west wing, or work carried out in its own right.

The house was under the ownership of Ralph Beard Esquire by at least 1642. Ralph Beard remained in residence until his death in 1655 and he was actively engaged in a legal career. As noted above, the owners of a building such as this, with early high-status features included in the construction from the outset were usually persons of wealth and social status within the community. The Beard family remained at the house until the end of the 18th century, Thomas Beards senior and junior continuing where Ralph left off in terms of ownership of the house but also by the shared pursuit of a legal career. Changes to the building were undoubtedly made by various members of the Beard family, if not on purchase or after changing hands then altered as and when required in line with changing fashions and innovations in addition to new household configurations.

==== Alterations to the roof ====
The initial opening up of the roof was achieved by inserting a robust valley rafter into the south slope; this abuts one of the retained original common rafters and is jointed in place. The wind-brace below the purlin in this location has been removed, the jointing retained, and the west end of the purlin truncated. The wind-brace may have been removed to facilitate the addition of the new valley rafter, while the purlin was removed to create the required through-access. The work was carried out to a high-degree, with care taken to mark out the assembly and to execute it with care rather than rely on bolts, straps or even nails. Such attention to construction is evident elsewhere in the building for the early phases of alteration (west side of east wing garret).

==== Alterations to the West Wing ====
It is not known what the extent of the ‘new’ rear addition took at this stage or if there had been an original predecessor with no through access at roof level as is the case at the junction of the main range and east wing, still in situ and original to the Phase 1 house.

If the southern timber framed wall at ground floor level was not Phase 1 in origin, then it was probably added in conjunction with the alterations to the west end of the roof, providing accommodation within a new west wing over two floors plus garrets to match that of the remainder of the house.

The creation of through-access at garret level may have been intended to create a better, more efficiently accessible suite of modern accommodation, moving away from the traditional form whereby each wing had its own separate means of access across its floors, often with no connection on the upper levels between the separate wings.

==== Date ====
There are no easily datable features within this early phase of addition/alteration. The south wall of the west wing is of small panel framing and this form of construction was generally superseded around 1700 by regular studs and straight raking shores. As such, if the south wall was not contemporary with the main and east wings, then it was probably added in the 17th century.

In addition the brickwork of the subsequent Phase 3 southwest extension abuts this earlier south timber framed wall indicating that it was already in situ, (certainly on site prior to the programme of alterations carried out by second Ralph Beard in 1743). The brickwork of the extension is laid in English bond and much of the fabric is consistent with a mid to late 17th century date with a cut-off point for construction prior to the 1743 scheme that abuts it.

==== 17th century fittings and fixtures ====
Within the building as a whole, on the exterior and interior there are several features and fixtures that have their origins between the dates of the original construction and the 1743 alterations. Much of the work however is movable and has been relocated to other parts of the building during phases of historic ‘modernisation’.

Much of the wainscoting within the building dates to the 17th century, some of it is stylistically earlier than others, and much of it has been altered and relocated. All of the wainscoting used indicates that the owners and occupants of the house responded to changes in fashion and succumbed to phases of re-decorating. The wainscoting within some parts of the first floor and more certainly within the garret are the result of later schemes, re-using the original material in less important rooms or less-visible locations in the closing decades of the 17th century when wainscoting of small panel type was being replaced with new schemes.

The wainscoting then indicates that the important rooms had been fitted out in the fashion of the day until the end of the 17th century when the house was updated and the schemes demoted to less important areas. Within some of the rooms, such as the original hall (northeast room – ground floor) the wainscoting appears to have been retained for longer and this may be indicative of function or indeed the profession of the owner at that time. As noted above, those involved in practising law may have been more traditional of taste, or more inclined to reinforce ties with traditional values and customs.

By the end of the 17th century further schemes of redecorating and alterations were made. The rain-water hopper on the east elevation of the east wing is dated to 1691 while Thomas Beard was resident at the house. Although the hopper could be re-used in its present location it indicates that some water-management work at least was carried out at that time. Within the house, several two-panel doors and some of the wainscoting schemes can also be attributed to the late 17th century, whether part of the same phase of work or separate schemes.

=== Phase 3 – late 17th century ===
The mid to late 17th century, southwest extension abuts the timber framed remains of the pre-existing west wing, be it Phase 1 or 2 in origin. The extension was intended to unite the various wings of the building, by adding the central corridor and accommodating the principal staircase.

The extension was constructed in brick and included a rebuild of the south wall of the east wing. The junction of the surviving timber frame weather clad in tile on the east side and the brickwork of the newly added south elevation is clearly visible as a straight joint at the southeast corner of the building above the old dairy.

The brickwork is laid for the most part in English bond with occasional vitrified (over-fired) headers. The south elevation is rendered over obscuring detail but the west side is exposed and the base of this wall includes a low brick plinth with a chamfered masonry cap.

The use of brick, laid in English bond and including the masonry embellishment is an expensive one. However, from c.1600 timber-framed construction was already increasingly replaced by mass-construction (brick or masonry) at this level of society, at first reserved for publicly visible elevations, but later as the material became more common and less expensive, for new extensions such as this.

On the west elevation, the brickwork of the stub-gable (including the window with rubbed-brick voussoirs) is slightly different in construction and may have been added or altered at a later date, perhaps in conjunction with the 1743 work that rebuilt the west end of the house and created access between the new cross-wing and this, the existing (southwest) extension.

==== Interior ====
The accommodation within this extension comprises the principal staircase providing access between the ground and first floors only. Access to the garret above this was via an inserted doorway within the west side of the roof-slope over the east wing. It is assumed that the doorway within the roof slope was added in conjunction with this southwest extension. It is probable that the corridors on the ground and first floors were added as part of this extension creating good circulation between all the rooms on the ground and first floors. Such an arrangement would have modernised the house, instead of separate means of access within separate wings, greater access and efficiency was achieved, facilitating the movement of staff throughout the building as well as the family and their guests.

The staircase is stylistically datable to the early to mid 17th century; however, redundant jointing and awkwardly jointed members indicate that it is reused in its present position. It is possible that the staircase was imported from another building and altered to fit this location, indicating that the insertion was no earlier than the mid 17th century.

The inserted doorway between east wing and southwest extension at garret level created access between the in situ east wing garrets and the new build. The alteration is a very well made one. The inserted posts that create the doorway interrupt the original west wall-plate of the east wing and are jointed and pegged in place, this is the sign of good quality and usually fairly early work, later insertions of this type omit the pegging and in many cases the jointing by notching, nailing and bolting separate timbers into position.

The newly created extension and the doorway between the existing building and the new provided a room accessible from the service staircase (S2). The un-heated room, given its location, may have been intended for staff accommodation, within easy reach of the service wing of the house.

=== Phase 4 – 1743 ===
The Phase 4 work is ascribed a date of 1743 which is that inscribed within the west slope of the garret roof in the west wing. The work at this stage was commissioned by the second Ralph Beard (resident until his death in 1754). Ralph Beard was a steward at law and as can be seen from his 1736 estate map, the owner of a fairly large holding in Hurstpierpoint.

The main elements of structural alteration to the Mansion House at this date comprised the replacement of the north and west elevations of the house in brick, laid in Flemish bond. Of interest is the terminal south end of the new west facade: this stops at the end of the wing and does not return to close (or rebuild) the southern end of the structure. The gap has subsequently been in-filled in similar brick at a later date. It was not unusual to rebuild the publicly visible facades of a house leaving those less visible, or lower in the social hierarchy of the house untouched, perhaps with a plan to carry out a second stage of rebuilding as funds (or inclination) allowed. The straight joints and discrepancy in the courses of brickwork between the west elevation and that of the southern in-fill show clearly the different phases of renovation.

The rebuilt north and west walls included well proportioned Georgian sash windows creating symmetrical facades. On the north front, access was central to the house, leading to the entrance hall and long corridor that extends the length of the composite plan. The new north and west facades included low parapets to conceal the slope of the roof construction, which was very much a feature of Georgian architecture.

The chimney stack between the main range and west cross-wing may have been added (or altered) at this stage, the brickwork is consistent with an 18th-century origin, but the interior finishes conceal any details that may indicate its pre-existence and as such rebuild during this phase of development.

The roof structure over the west wing was rebuilt as part of the 1743 work. The staggered butt-purlin construction included integral dormer windows on the west slope. As part of the new roof construction, a second valley rafter was inserted into the south slope of the roof parallel to the first. The new valley rafter was jointed to a corresponding rafter on the west slope, and the apex of the new construction set at a lower level than its predecessor. The interior of the roof slopes were plastered from the outset.

The long corridor that extends from the north entrance to the south elevation of the house was already in situ in some form, as noted above, added with the principal staircase of the southwest extension. The Georgian remodelling upgraded this access by adding the arch-ways (both flat and rounded) with dropped key block detail and pilasters at intervals along the length of the corridor to embellish the feature while supporting the floor above. The stylistic elements no doubt box-in or conceal earlier timber framed members. The door at the south end of the corridor is of this phase of development, and it is highly possible that the pattern for it was picked out of one of the fashionable books on architecture available at the time.

==== Interior alterations ====
Interior alterations that resulted in the occasional eccentric scheme of wainscoting no doubt date from the Georgian modernisation. Where small square panel wainscoting was no longer deemed fashionable enough it was stripped out and relegated as finishes to less publicly visible rooms, such as the garrets. New schemes were also introduced, including the ‘modern’ wainscoting of the first floor study and that in situ within the kitchen chamber on the first floor of the east wing.

The Georgian alterations included the replacement of some of the doors with six or eight moulded panel types, often saved for the rooms further up the social hierarchy or indeed more publicly visible, such as those to the ground floor of the main range. Many of the windows remain from this stage of alterations, particularly the elegant sash windows on the north elevation. On the interior, the rooms were updated to include fireplaces and surrounds befitting the Georgian home. All in all, much of the interior fittings and finishes were modernised during this phase of development, with the emphasis placed on the ‘better rooms’.

=== Phase 5 – early 19th century (Regency era) ===
The Regency era work may be attributable to the Weekes family after initial purchase but prior to becoming residents. The main elements of alteration comprised changes to parts of the west elevation of the house. The work included the enlargement of the windows in the rear parlour of the ground floor west wing to create taller three-part sashes that could be opened to create doorways to the gardens. At the north end of the elevation a tripartite window was inserted into the first floor front room to create a parlour.

==== Interior alterations ====
The interior alterations comprised the raising of the ceiling within the rear ground floor parlour of the west wing. The ceiling and of course the floor of the room above were raised to create a grand ground floor parlour to the rear of the west wing. The interior of the room was fitted out in wainscoting consistent with the date of alteration, including an ornate over-mantle and marble fireplace. The over-mantle may make use of some earlier fabric in its design.

By contrast, the room above the parlour lost some of its storey height and required a small lobby with stairs to create access from the upper corridor. The lobby includes a linen closet and bell and both may have been conducive to providing staff accommodation in this location. The interior of the room was heated by a fireplace in the north wall and well lit by the two sash windows on the west. As such, if staff had been accommodated in this location it was probable that they were at the upper end of the hierarchy – perhaps as nurse-maid to the children of the house with good access to the other bedrooms and to the garrets by means of the staircase (S3) situated directly opposite.

=== Phase 6 – 19th century (the Weekes Family and the school) ===
Few significant external alterations were subsequently made to the building. The tile hanging on the east side of the house and the horizontal sliding sash windows of the kitchen (east wing) are of 19th century origin, as are the French doors in the ground floor north room at the west side of the house. The glazing of the French doors is consistent with an Arts and Crafts era and this may be attributable to Arthur Weekes and his wife Jessie Nelson Weekes, resident together from the date of their marriage in 1888 until Arthur's death in 1917.

The additions of extra flues to the chimney stacks to create heated accommodation within the garrets (and those first floor rooms that had gone without) may date to the 19th century and perhaps for the west wing, the early Edwardian era.

Some of the interior alterations, perhaps the wainscoting of the upper corridor, changes to the south wall of the study, many of the match-board cupboards, hooks, pegs and shelves may date in the first instance to the school years in the mid 19th century.

=== Phase 7 – 20th century onwards ===
The modern alterations to the house are fairly minimal when considered with the extent of original and historic fabric that remains within the building. Alterations include the fitting out of bathrooms and the addition of the WCs, the fitted kitchen within the garret east wing, and of course the many service runs that go hand in hand with such things.

== Description of the current building ==
=== Exterior ===
In 2013/14, the house is predominantly of brick laid in Flemish bond with some tile-hung areas to the east side. The house is two storeys plus garrets and cellars and is of composite construction, comprising several distinct phases of development.

For descriptive purposes, the various wings are labelled thus: Main range; east wing, west wing, southwest extension, central corridor and WCs.

=== North (principal) elevation ===
The principal elevation is the north side of the main range, set parallel to the High Street onto which it fronts. The steps leading up to the front door extend onto the narrow brick pavement in front of the house. The fenestration is symmetrical comprising a centrally situated entrance flanked by a pair of Georgian six-over-six sash windows that are set back from flush with the fabric of the elevation. The first floor has a further five window openings, that to the west is now blank having been ‘stopt’ up in 1801 presumably with the window adjacent, this one has since been reinstated. All of the windows have narrow projecting sills and flat arched heads of fine rubbed brick voussoirs with a contrasting centrally projecting key.

There are four cellar windows set within a slightly projecting brick plinth with contrasting quoins and moulded stone cap. The barred window openings are under segmental arched soffits of brick and the arrangement here replicates that of the ground floor windows. The glazing is set back well back from flush with the plinth brickwork and has been replaced. A moulded projecting string course that stops short of the rusticated quoins (and is interrupted over the entrance) separates ground from first floor, repeated above, between first floor windows and the low parapet that conceals the Horsham stone roof behind. Where the string course surmounts the window the detail of the central keystone of the rubbed brick voussoirs is picked up in the string that in these areas also projects slightly.

The string courses, quoins, plinth, central keystone of the rubbed brick voussoirs and doorway are painted white to contrast with the red brickwork of the elevation.

The doorway is flanked by a pair of plain pilasters with simple moulded caps and bases. The frieze is narrow and comprises alternating projecting fluted and fielded recessed panels surmounted by a flat door hood over shallow fluted modillions.

The jambs and soffit of the entrance are panelled, the configuration of the panels to the jambs matching exactly that of the door itself indicating that they are contemporary. The door is eight-panel type, two short panels at the top over two taller panels, repeated below the lock rail. The door knocker on the central muntin is a ring knocker and has a fleur-de-lis motif. A door bell is situated to the west side of the entrance fixed upon three cast iron back-plates. The bell pull is suspended from a chain fixed to the rod. To the east side of the entrance a plaque has been placed to acknowledge the role of the building in the early years of the formation of Hurst College.

The three steps leading up to the entrance are in concrete rendered brick. The steps had been flanked by a pair of bollards on the brick pavement.

=== Boundary wall ===
The wall to the west of the house is of brick, with at least the lower fifteen courses being consistent with the construction of the dwelling in terms of fabric and courses. The upper c. 25 courses are laid in Flemish garden wall bond in larger bricks with occasional over-fired headers culminating in a contrasting coping stone cap.

The boundary wall at the eastern end of the house has a low stepped plinth consistent in height with that of the house. Above the plinth there are approximately 12 courses of wall laid in English bond albeit with some evidence of patching and repair. A soldier course of over-fired headers separates the lower (earlier) fabric and the remaining courses that are laid in a variation of Flemish garden wall bond. The eastern end of the wall curves round towards the gated entrance.

The fabric above and below the soldier course on the curve is predominantly of brick laid in header bond for strength and ease of curved construction. The present gate-way is within a wall of much later brickwork, the gate surmounted by a segmental arched soffit with tiled springing points. The top of the wall is stepped and the capping courses have a tiled finish. The gate is of wrought iron made to fit exactly the arched opening within the 20th century brickwork of the entrance.

To the east, between the later brickwork and the adjacent property is a narrow surviving section of earlier brickwork. The brickwork includes a round-headed archway that has since been blocked.

The paving in front of the entrance, between the curved section of wall to the west and the remains of the historic brick to the east (abutting the public house) is cobbled with a central brick path.

=== East elevation ===
The east elevation of the main range is partially obscured by the addition of Mansion Cottage at the north end and the old dairy at the south end. The visible part of the main range comprises a narrow expanse of tile-hanging at first floor level between the cottage extension and the short return to the brickwork and quoins of the principal elevation.

The gable is a projecting one extending further east than the wall below and the finish is also one of tile-hanging (matching that of the adjacent cottage). The tiles are clay and are decorative fish-scale type of probable 19th century origin. At the gable the cladding is embellished by pierced white painted timber barge-boards. A single two light casement window lights the interior of the garrets. The window has a moulded timber frame with a central mullion that is hollow-chamfered on the exterior and plain chamfered on the interior. The leaded lights have diamond quarrels and each light is side hung on pintles fixed to the timber frame.

The decorative tile-hanging continues along the full length of the elevation at first-floor level terminating against at the brick south elevation. The tile-hanging indicates that the building here retains part of its original timber frame. At ground floor level between the later dairy and cottage, the wall construction is brick laid in Sussex bond standing to 16 courses in height surmounted by a full run of glazing interrupted only by the single-width doorway.

The ground floor windows are multi-pane timber ones, including a horizontal sliding sash to the north of the doorway. The first floor windows are more varied, that to the south end has obscured glass, is multi-pane and of 20th century origin, the one above the doorway is a three-light casement, the central light is side-hung on pintles to open outwards and each light has rectangular quarrels of probable late 17th or early 18th century origin and an eight-over-height Georgian sash window is situated to the north. The final window on this elevation is a two-light casement within a gabled dormer clad in modern horizontal weather boards. The window is situated roughly central to the elevation, each light is side-hung and they are separated by a broad mullion.

The doorway is fairly plain, befitting access into the original kitchen wing of the house. The doorway is vertically boarded, set within a bead-moulded timber frame that is surmounted by a flat door hood supported on a pair of moulded console brackets.

A rain-water hopper is situated to the south of the central first floor window. The hopper has moulded upper and lower edges and a central spout. The date 1691 surmounts the spout separated from the initials T.B by a pair of fleur-de-lis motifs. The outer sides of the hopper include a pair of figures. The hopper can be ascribed to Thomas Beard, owner of the property having inherited it from his father Ralph, after his death in 1655. The hopper clearly relates to the development of the property but may be reused in its current location.

The roof is slope is under Horsham stone. Two brick-built chimneys can be seen rising above the roof-line. The northern chimney is original, built as part of the c. 1575 house comprising a rectangular stack with roll-moulded brick courses reducing the wider base at intervals towards the upper part of the stack. On the north side, the stack has three sections separated by recess detail. The capping courses have been rebuilt and an additional stack added to the rear. Only two flues remain active, indicated by the pair of modern chimney pots on the east side of the stack.

The second chimney on the east side of the building is at the south end of the east wing. The south stack is of fairly plain construction, rectangular in plan with a single projecting course above the base, stepping back towards the upper part of the stack. The chimney is an addition albeit an historic one. Two modern chimney pots extend up from the north side of the stack, one of which must provide the flue for the range within the present kitchen; it is notable that there are no extant fireplaces in the rooms at the south end of this wing.

=== South elevation ===
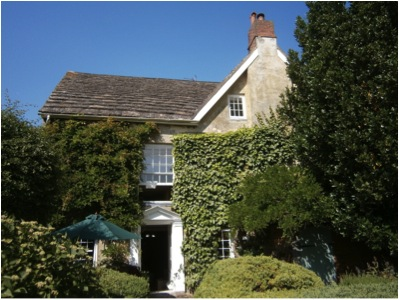
South elevation, Mansion House 2014

The south elevation of the house has been given a rendered finish obscuring the construction details. The gabled end of the east wing includes two ground floor windows, the eastern now within the later log-store. No first floor windows were visible during the initial survey due to vegetation and on the interior; the fitted bathroom in this location prevents ascertaining the presence/absence of any historic windows. The garret rooms within the southern end of the east wing are lit by two single light (20th century) casements, one to each side of the chimney stack.

The remainder of the south elevation is formed by the southwest extension to the house, effectively closing the southern part of what was by then (if not originally) a U-plan house. The elevation comprises at ground floor level a doorway abutting the east wing with a ten pane over 10 sash window adjacent on the west side. The first floor includes a sash window with 15 panes over 15, both windows have substantial glazing bars and together with the multi-pane format are indicative of late 17th/early 18th century origin. The roof is once again finished in Horsham stone. It is not clear due to the rendered finish here if the window was part of the late 17th century work or the refurbishment carried out in 1743 by the second Ralph Beard.

The doorway has plain pilasters with simple moulded capitals surmounted by a moulded triangular pediment. The door has four rows of glazed panes, three to each row set above a pair of moulded panels, a style again consistent with an early to mid 18th century origin.

==== South End of the West Wing ====
Set well back from the south end of the east wing and southwest extensions sits the rather plain south end of the west wing. The wall, visible above later extensions is of brick laid in Flemish bond with some over-fired headers. Straight joints are visible at the junction with the west elevation and the southwest extension. It appears that the original probable timber framed fabric of this part of the wall was left intact when the 1743 re-fronting was carried out.

==== West elevations ====
The west elevation comprises the west end of the main wing, the west wing proper and the west end of the southwest extension. As the house now stands, the fabric of the main and west wings are consistent although the west side lacks some of the stylistic elements of the principal, publicly visible elevation.

Construction (with the exception of the west end of the southwest extension) is still in Flemish bond; the windows retain the fine rubbed-brick voussoirs but lack the central projecting keystone. The southwest corner lacks the rusticated quoins, the plinth is low with an un-painted moulded brick cap and there are no string courses.

The fenestration comprised five windows at ground floor level, presumably repeated above but altered during the programme of work carried out in 1801 during which a larger west window was created for a new first floor parlour.

All of the ground floor windows had stopped short of the plinth, the original extent indicated by the queen closers, and also by the rather abrupt truncation of the plinth where the new doors have been inserted.

The north window, original to the brickwork of the elevation has been blocked. The French doors adjacent to the blocked window are inserted into one of the original openings. The new arrangement comprises a pair of narrow doors surmounted by a rectangular two-pane over-light, the two panes separated by a central mullion. The glazing comprises a central arrangement of full panes bordered by narrow margins, the margins in coloured glass. The upper corner panes of each door include floral stained glass motifs of probable Arts and Crafts origin.

The six-over-six sash window central to the elevation retains its original function and the two neighbouring tall three part sash windows are also within original openings, extended down through the plinth to ground level.

At first floor level the three southern openings accommodate six-over-six sash windows original to the brickwork. Much of the elevation between the visible original windows and the inserted one at the north end was obscured by vegetation at the date of survey. However, if the fenestration was indeed symmetrical as suggested, then the remains of the earlier locations, queen closers or voussoirs, should they still be in situ or later brick rebuilding may remain behind the vegetation.

The north window, as noted, was put into the elevation in 1801. The window is of tripartite type comprising a six-over-six sash with narrow margin lights. The glazing bars are narrow and elegant, consistent with the Regency era within which it was built.

Two gabled dormer windows can be seen rising above the parapet, set within the west slope of the roof, lighting the garrets. The chimney stack is L-shaped in plan and constructed of plain brick embellished by stepped courses at the capital. Five chimney pots are in situ.

==== Southwest extension ====
The west elevation of the southwest extension, set back from the west wing, is of brick laid in English bond. A low plinth at the base of the wall is capped by moulded stone. A doorway, at the south end of the elevation leads to a lower landing of the main staircase inside the house. The door has four glazed panes arranged in two rows set above the lock rail; below the rail are two moulded panels. The doorway has been inserted into the brickwork causing some rebuild close to the base of the north jamb. A bell pull remains in situ to the north of the door.

Two windows are situated at garret level, that to south is within a historic opening. It is not possible to ascertain if the opening was part of the late 17th century work or a later phase of alteration. A similar but later window is situated to the north, cut into the brickwork.

== Design and Conservation Awards ==
April 2015 - Hurstpierpoint Society

May 2015 - Federation of Sussex Amenity Society

== Mansion House Garden ==
To be completed

== Mansion House pictures over the centuries ==
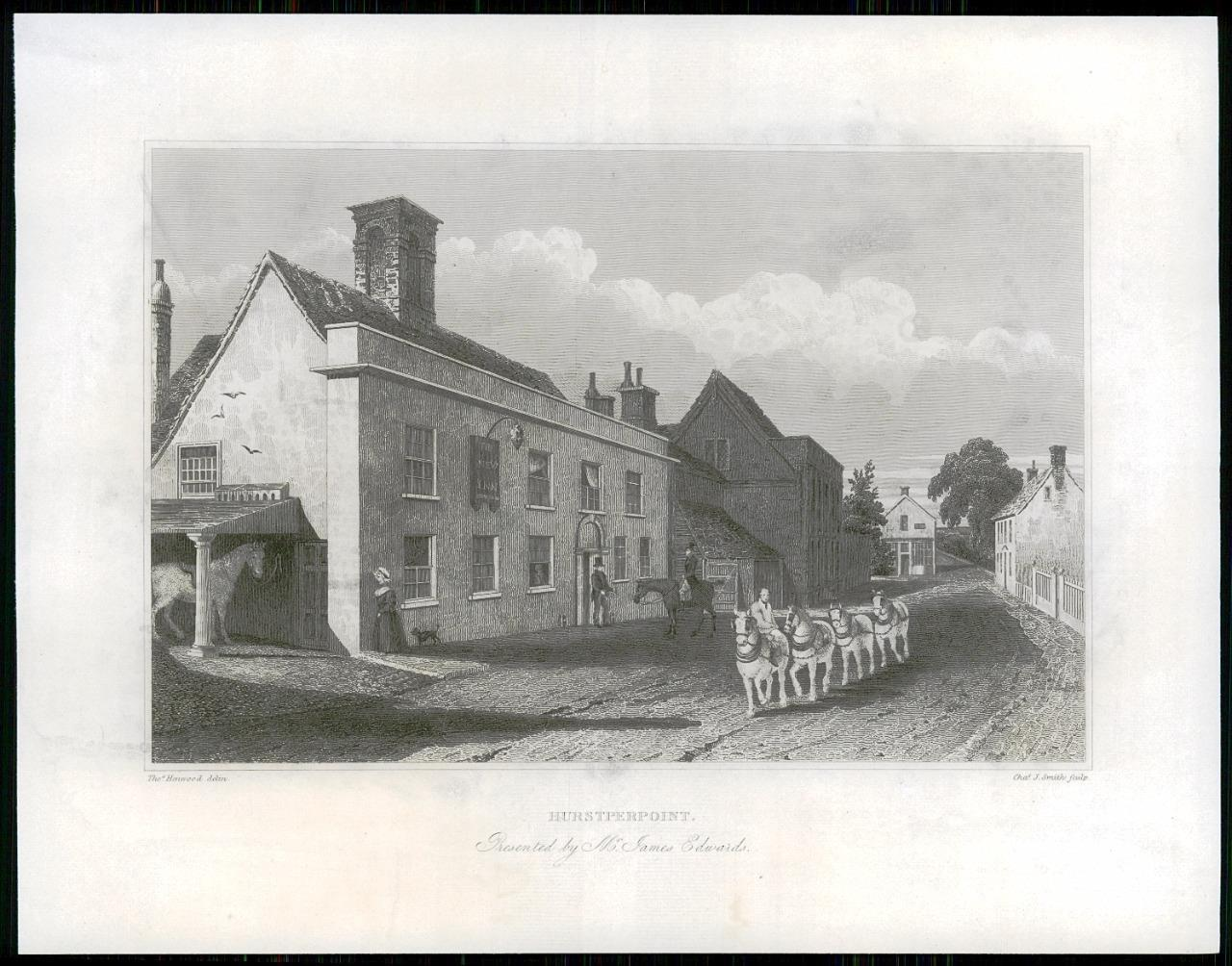
House, Hurstpierpoint 1830

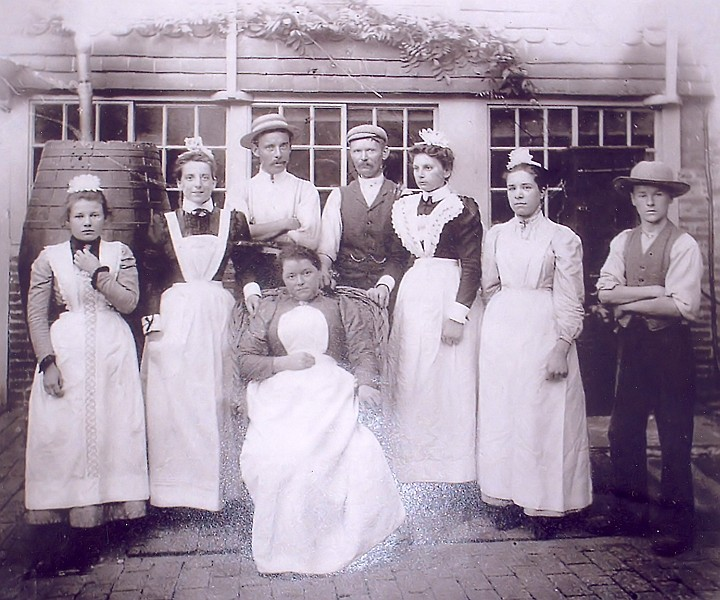
Staf of Mansion House
