= Lawn mower racing =

Form of motorsport where lawn movers are used

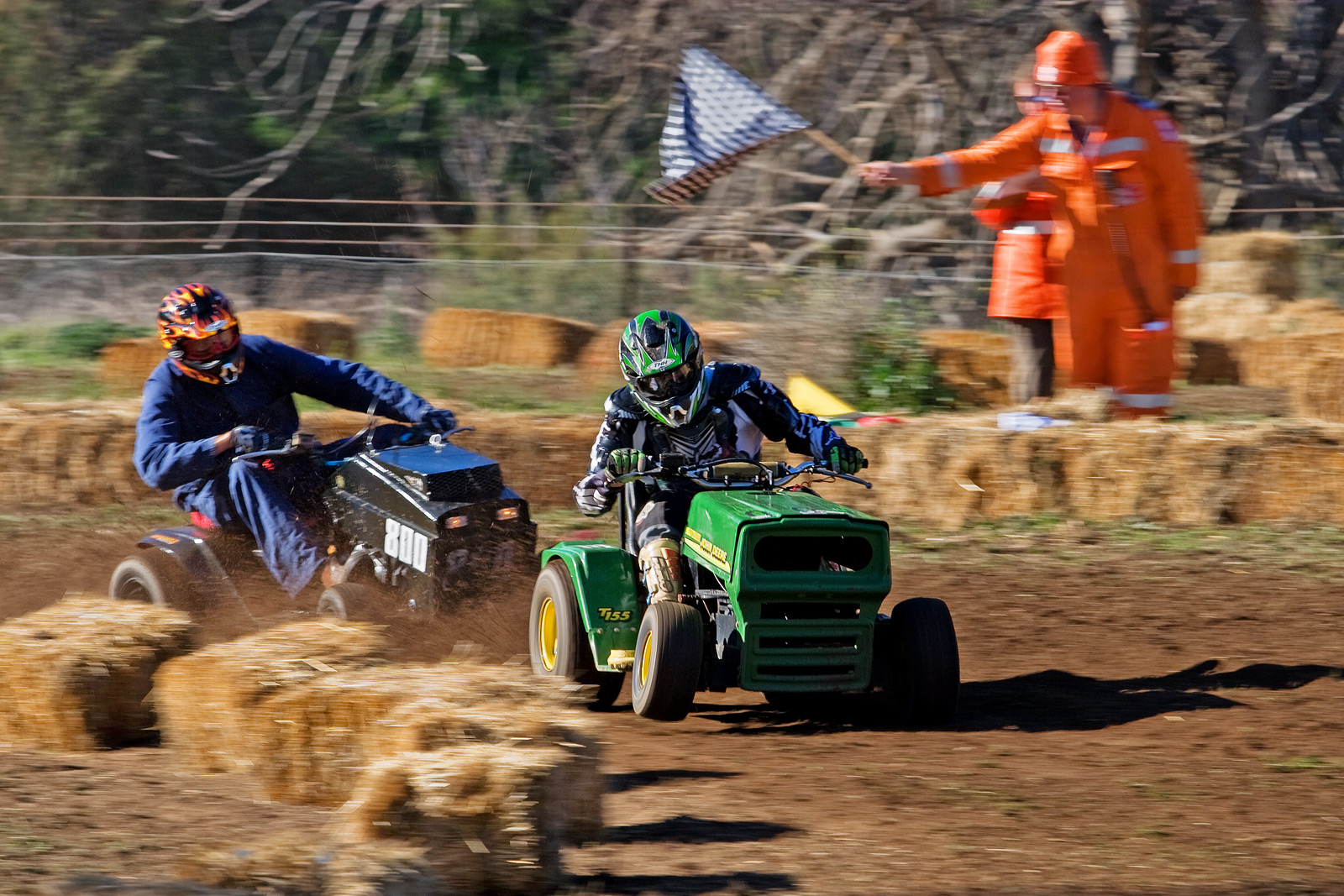
The finish line of the 250cc class at the 2007 Swifts Creek lawnmower races

Lawnmower racing is a form of motorsport in which competitors race modified lawnmowers, usually of the ride-on or self-propelled variety. The original mower engines are retained, but the blades are removed for safety. The sport attracts all ages and is usually entered into in a spirit of fun rather than extreme competitiveness, though many participants do take it seriously.

== In the United Kingdom ==
The earliest record of an organized race involving lawnmowers in the United Kingdom is in 1968 when the Ashton on Mersey Cricket Club organized a sporting event by the name "Lawn Mower Grand Prix" for the benefit fund of Lancashire cricketer Ken Higgs. The event consisted of a dash over 880 yards and was sponsored by Esso and Player's No. 6 cigarettes. The event was won by Daily Mirror journalist Roy Allett and Jimmy Savile came third. Savile reportedly prayed before competing and remarked that he has never driven a lawn mower before, "How can you mow in a council flat?"

The British Lawn Mower Racing Association (BLMRA) was formed in 1973 by Rally co-driver Jim Gavin. Jim and a bunch of fellow sporting enthusiasts were bemoaning the prohibitive costs of getting involved in any kind of motorsport whilst enjoying a pint at The Cricketers Arms in Wisborough Green, West Sussex. They looked across the village green and noticed the groundsman mowing the cricket pitch. Realizing that everyone had a lawn mower in their garden shed they asked themselves: Why not race them? A local venue was found and 80 mowers turned up for that first meeting.

There are several Lawn Mower Racing clubs in the UK with slightly differing construction rules but a similar ethos that events should be professionally run and costs kept to a minimum. Racing tends to take place in bare fields, with the track marked in a temporary fashion typically using bales or plastic blocks. The racing format is generally either sprint or endurance, although fun races take various formats including relay and last man standing. There are various championships held throughout the racing season.

Initially, mowers were self-propelled models such as the Suffolk Punch which were re-geared and required the operator to run behind. These quickly gave way to larger cylinder mowers with towed seats which are now referred to as Group 2. Groups 3 and 4 followed in time, these are wheel-driven ride-on mowers, Group 3 being an open-engined garden rider (typically the Westwood Lawnbug) and Group 4 being a lawn tractor. All mowers must have their blades removed, and retain specified original components such as their chassis, bonnet, and drive configuration. Engine regulations vary between clubs, but these are standard lawn mower-type engines with little or no modification or tuning. Given the right track conditions, mowers can reach speeds of up to 50 mph although track design serves to limit this and ensure that driver skill remains an important element of the sport.

One of the best-known events is the annual BLMRA 12-hour endurance race which has been held near Wisborough Green since 1978. The first such event was won by Sir Stirling Moss, Derek Bell and Tony Hazlewood (designer and builder of the Westwood Lawnbug). Actor Oliver Reed also participated. The event attracts participants from other British clubs and from all over the world, including competitors from France, Belgium, Germany, Luxembourg, Finland and the United States. 2018 saw the win taken by an overseas entrant for the first time in the event's history when it was won by a team from Luxembourg. The current distance record over the 12 hours sits at 354.5 miles.

== In the United States ==
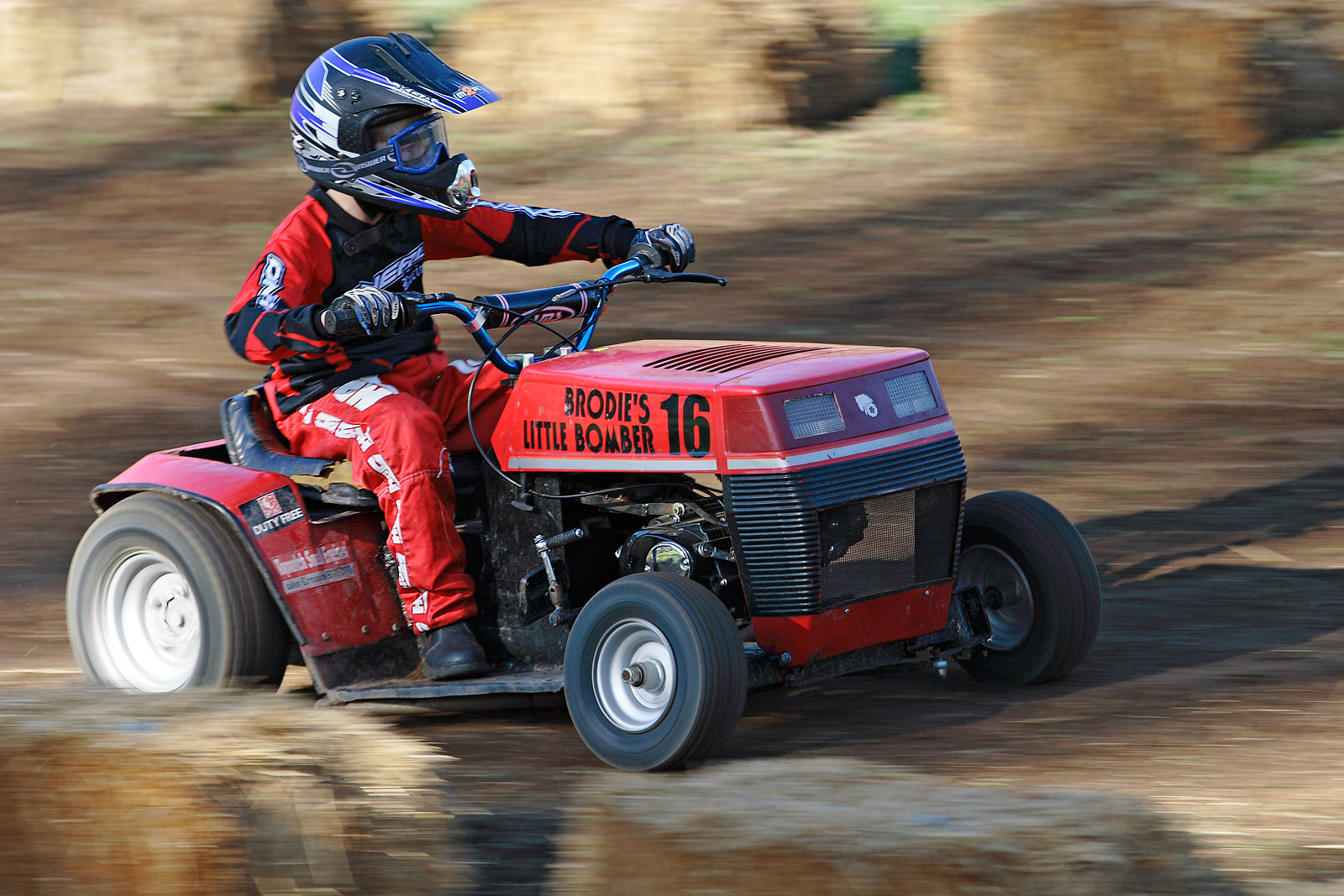
Young competitors, such as this 10-year-old boy, race in less powerful mowers.

The Twelve Mile 500 is a lawn mower race held in the small town of Twelve Mile, Indiana, organized by the Twelve Mile Lions Club and occurring annually on Independence Day. The tradition began in 1963 as a race for factory-built mowers with their mowing decks removed but in 1996 split into a two-race event with one for four-cycle Briggs lawn mowers and another for modified mowers. The race adopted the "Grand Prix" style in 1970 and has been held in Plank Hill Park ever since. The race structure has once again changed with the addition of another race. The 2010 race included a superstock race in addition to the Briggs and modified races. The Twelve Mile 500 consists of a 15-mile, 60-lap course run on a quarter-mile track in the park, with a maximum of 33 entrants per race. Each participating team consists of a driver, a two-person pit crew, and a lap judge, and must meet a speed of approximately 30 mph to qualify just like in NASCAR racing.

The U.S. Lawn Mower Racing Association was formed as a national sanctioning club in United States in 1992 by the makers of a petrol stabilizer called Sta-bil, who had visited the UK and witnessed a race meeting. The American Racing Mower Association was an alternate national club founded in 1995.

Lawnmower racing in the US should not be confused with go-karting, wherein lawn mower engines have often been used, especially amongst the amateur participants in go-karting. Lawn mower racing is based firmly around the use of both engines and chassis from regular model mowers. Also, where go-karts are exclusively raced on relatively flat surfaces, lawnmowers can be raced off-road.

=== In North Carolina ===
Since the summer of 1984, the North Wilkesboro Rotary Club has played host to lawnmower racing at its Wilkes County Agricultural Fairground facility. Sanctioned by the Allegheny Mower Racing Association, oval track racing on the dirt is reminiscent of the beginnings of stock car racing at the North Wilkesboro Speedway and the birth of NASCAR. Crowds have grown from a few hundred to gatherings of thousands on several Saturday nights from June through September. The Wilkes County fairground site is said by many participants to be the premier facility within the AMRA circus.

Proceeds from the club's lawnmower racing events are distributed throughout the year to the many activities supported by the North Wilkesboro Rotary Club. The club contributes to most local United Way agencies, provides annual scholarships to local high school students, and holds a Christmas Party for the county's foster children, while also supporting worldwide relief efforts of Rotary International.

=== In Missouri ===
Starting in the spring of 2013 lawn mower racing has been held every other Saturday in Patton, Missouri. Racers from all over Southeast Missouri and parts of Arkansas come to the Patton Saddle Club to race their racing machines. The races are held due to a merging of the Southeast Missouri Lawn Mower Racing Association (SMLMRA for short) and the Patton Lions Club. Hundreds of fans come to watch the races at only five dollars a carload. All proceeds are taken care of by the Lions Club.

Racers vary in age from six to seventy in five separate classes. Kids (6–12 years old) run in the Youth Class. Their mowers are limited to a stock lawn mower engine with a governor set to no more than 3650 rpm and a 10:1 gear ratio. Adult classes are split by running time trials. Time trials are set up like a qualifying run in NASCAR. A-Class is the mowers that run the fastest times. D-Class is the mowers that run the slowest during time trials. B and C-Class are in between the other two.

Mowers are unlimited to engine sizes; however, safety plays a big role in the rules. All racers are expected to wear full-face helmets, gloves, boots, a long-sleeve racing shirt, and a neck restraint. Mowers must be equipped with back bumpers (no front bumpers), leg protectors where the feet would be on the mower, a kill switch to turn off the engine in case of an accident, working brakes, cupholders, and a plate on the right-hand side of the hood to keep starters from blowing out of the sides if an engine were to blow up.

The first female youth lawn mower racer came from Missouri. Her name was Gabby. She raced her first race Fall of 2006 at the age of 6. Many female racers have come after her. She began racing to spend time with her father then began to love the sport herself.

=== In New Mexico ===
Lawn mower racing
Lawn mowers racing on GSR Kartway dirt oval — 1.01 MB

Another popular destination for this form of Motorsport is New Mexico. Contrary to other regions, there are strict rules concerning the class of lawnmowers as well as how they are operated. Starting in January 1983, the lawnmowers used were primarily John Deere, however, due to the dangerous horsepower produced by these engines, this class of lawnmowers was no longer found acceptable to race. In 2012, Craftsmen was declared the most-used lawnmower brand in New Mexico. Craftsmen had reported 290 racers using this brand in the 127 races in New Mexico that year. Later in 2015 new rules were imposed on the lawn mower racing system In New Mexico preventing lawn mower racing from occurring in populated locations.

== In Australia ==
The first lawn mower race in Australia took place in a small, country pub in Harrietville, Victoria in 1988. Five men challenged each other to a race around the hills in the area after an argument while drunk. The contestants arrived with unmodified Briggs & Strattons (popular lawnmower brands), circled a nominated gum tree, and drove down in "Angel Gear" – Australian outback slang for neutral – to the finish line. "Half the town's 100 people, 300 sheep, and 150 dogs were there," according to Brian Ross, the president of the Australian Ride-On Lawn Mower Racing Association (AROLMRA).
