= River Arun =

River in West Sussex, England

Arun Tarrant
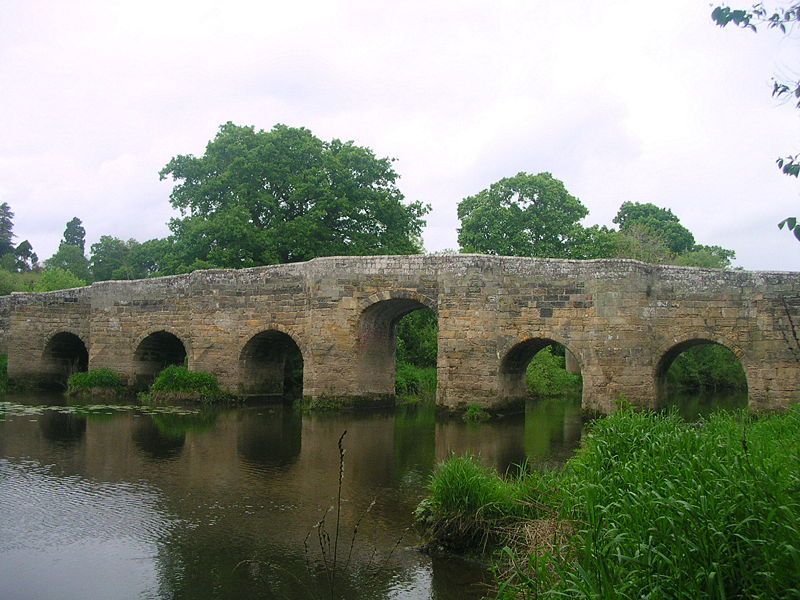
- Stopham Bridge near Pulborough. The centre arch was raised in 1822.

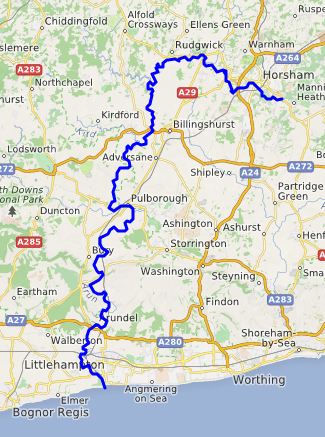
- Course of the Arun

Location
- Country: England
- County: West Sussex
- Towns: Horsham, Arundel, Littlehampton

Physical characteristics
- Source
  - location: St Leonard's Forest, West Sussex
  - elevation: 125 m (410 ft)
- Mouth
  - location: Littlehampton, West Sussex
  - elevation: 0 m (0 ft)
- Length: 60 km (37 mi)
- Basin size: 376 sq mi (970 km^{2})
- Discharge
  - location: Pallingham Quay
  - average: 4.78 m^{3}/s (169 cu ft/s)
  - minimum: 0.31 m^{3}/s (11 cu ft/s)
  - maximum: 78.5 m^{3}/s (2,770 cu ft/s)
- Discharge
  - location: Alfoldean
  - average: 1.84 m^{3}/s (65 cu ft/s)

Basin features
- Tributaries
  - left: River Stor, River Kird, North River, River Lox / Loxwood Stream
  - right: River Rother
- Protection status

Ramsar Wetland
- Official name: Arun Valley
- Designated: 16 December 1999
- Reference no.: 1011

The River Arun (/ˈærən/) is a river in the English county of West Sussex. At 37 miles (60 km) long, it is the longest river entirely in Sussex and one of the longest starting in Sussex after the River Medway, River Wey and River Mole. From the series of small streams that form its source in the area of St Leonard's Forest in the Weald, the Arun flows westwards through Horsham to Nowhurst where it is joined by the North River. Turning to the south, it is joined by its main tributary, the western River Rother, and continues through a gap in the South Downs to Arundel to join the English Channel at Littlehampton. It is one of the faster flowing rivers in England, and is tidal as far inland as Pallingham Quay, 25.5 miles (41.0 km) upstream from the sea at Littlehampton. The Arun gives its name to the Arun local government district of West Sussex.

The first major improvements to the river were made between the 1540s and the 1570s, when Arundel became a port, and navigation up to Pallingham was improved, but barges had difficulty negotiating the flash locks that were installed. The work was carried out by Henry FitzAlan, 19th Earl of Arundel, who made the upper section toll-free. Harbour commissioners managed the lower river from Arundel to the sea from 1732, and major improvements to keep the estuary free from silt were sanctioned by an act of Parliament obtained in 1793. With the coming of the railways and changes in coastal shipping, Littlehampton superseded Arundel as the port of the Arun, and the Littlehampton harbour commissioners are still responsible for the river up to Arundel, collecting tolls for its use.

The river above Arundel was improved after 1785. As the main channel was toll-free, the proprietors of the scheme built two major cuts. One, which included three locks and passed through Hardham Tunnel, was built to avoid a large bend near Pulborough. The other was near the upper terminus, where a cut with three locks and a flood lock crossed the original channel by an aqueduct to reach wharves at Newbridge. Further improvements were made when the Wey and Arun Canal opened in 1816, joining the Arun Navigation at Newbridge, and after the completion of the Portsmouth and Arundel Canal, which opened soon afterwards. These two canals were an attempt to provide an inland route between London and Portsmouth, but were not as successful as the proprietors hoped. Traffic declined rapidly when the railways offered competition, and the navigation ceased to be maintained from 1888, though some traffic continued on the lower sections. The Wey and Arun Canal is currently being restored, and restoration will eventually include the cut and locks below Newbridge.

== History ==
When Ptolemy wrote his Geography around 150 AD, the Arun was called the Trisantonis, with later accounts using the same name. Trisantonis is thought to be a Brythonic word for 'the trespasser', indicating the river's tendency to flood land near to the river. Trisanto translates directly as 'one who goes across'. There is also a theory that the Arun may have been known as the Trisantonis in its lower reaches close to the sea, but known as the Arnus (from the Brythonic 'Arno' meaning run, go, or flow) in its upper reaches. It is possible that the town of Arundel may mean Arno-dell, or dell of the flowing river. By the Middle Ages the river was known as the river of Arundel, the Arundel river, or the high stream of Arundel. An alternative name, the Tarrant (derived from Trisantona), is, however, attested in 725 and 1270, and is reflected in the road name Tarrant Street, one of the main roads running through the town roughly parallel to the river. The first use of the modern name was recorded in 1577, but the alternative names of Arundel river or great river continued to be used for many years.

A further possible etymology derived from the Domesday spelling Harundel for Arundel comes from the Anglo Saxon hærn dell meaning "tidal valley", which this would mean that the name of the river probably also derives from "tidal". Other local rivers such as the Rother deriving from the Anglo Saxon róðer, which means "rower" (as in a long river), are also descriptive of the river and its surrounds.

The mouth of the river has not always been at Littlehampton. Until the later fifteenth century it joined the River Adur at Lancing some ten miles to the east before entering the sea. This estuary became blocked with shingle by the eastward drift of the tides, pushing the Adur towards Shoreham-by-Sea, while the Arun broke out at Worthing, Goring and Ferring at various times, until it formed its present estuary at Littlehampton between 1500 and 1530.

=== Improvements ===
The lower portion of the river, from the sea to Ford, was navigable in the eleventh century at the time of the Norman Conquest. In the sixteenth century, Henry FitzAlan, 19th Earl of Arundel built wharves at Ford, and improved the river channel below there, so that the town became a port. Over the 30 years from 1544, he also improved the river as far upstream as Pallingham Quay. Although the work involved a number of flash locks, which were not very successful, no tolls were charged for its use, and vessels of around 15 tons were used to carry timber. Attempts to make the river navigable up to Newbridge in the early sixteenth century were not successful.

An act of Parliament, the Littlehampton Harbour Act 1732 (6 Geo. 2. c. 12), was obtained, the main emphasis of which was the improvement of "the harbour of Littlehampton, called Arundel Port", but improvements to the first 5.75 miles (9.25 km) of the river, from the sea to Arundel, were also authorised. Commissioners were appointed, with powers to erect piers and to cut a new channel to the sea through a sand bar. The act allowed them to charge tolls for use of the facilities, and once the initial costs had been repaid, one half of the tolls were to be used to maintain the harbour and the river channel up to Arundel. Although most ships were of 30 or 40 tons, ships of up to 100 tons could reach Arundel as a result of the work, and trade improved.

Arun, Sussex Navigation Act 1785
- Act of Parliament
- Parliament of Great Britain
- Long title: An Act for amending and improving the Navigation of the River Arun from Houghton Bridge in the Parish of Houghton, in the County of Sussex, to Pallenham Wharf in the Parish of Wisborough Green, in the said County; and for continuing and extending the Navigation of the said River Arun from the said Wharf called Pallenham Wharf to a certain Bridge called New Bridge, situate in the Parishes of Pullborough and Wisborough Green, in the said County of Sussex.
- Citation: 25 Geo. 3. c. 100
- Territorial extent: Great Britain

Dates
- Royal assent: 13 May 1785
- Commencement: 25 January 1785 (Note: Start of session.)

Status: Current legislation

Text of statute as originally enacted

The next act, the Arun, Sussex Navigation Act 1785 (25 Geo. 3. c. 100) to affect the river was obtained by a group of local men in 1785. Under the act, the proprietors were empowered to make the river navigable for 30-ton barges up to Newbridge. They had no jurisdiction over the river from Arundel to Houghton bridge, and could not charge tolls for use of the river up to Pallingham. There were 31 members of the proprietors, who could raise £10,000 by issuing 100 shares worth £100 each. Day-to-day oversight of the affairs of the navigation were managed by three proprietors, with a half-yearly meeting of the larger group. The purpose of the navigation was to carry coal, chalk and lime upstream, and agricultural produce in the other direction. Rather than improve the river channel, the navigation upstream of Pallingham consisted of a separate channel, containing three locks, and an aqueduct which carried the navigation over the river at Orfold. The journey below Pallingham was made 3 miles (4.8 km) shorter by cutting a new channel between Coldwaltham and Hardham. This involved the construction of three more locks and a 375-yard (343 m) tunnel. The Pallingham to Newbridge section opened on 1 August 1787, while the Hardham cut was completed in mid-1790. The cost of the work was around £16,000.

There were two proposals to extend the navigation at this time. The first was for a canal to North Chapel, to the north of Petworth, in 1791, and the second was for a canal to Horsham in the following year. The route was surveyed by John Rennie, who estimated that it would cost £18,133 to build, but negotiations with the existing proprietors failed, and the scheme was dropped in 1794. Meanwhile, a second act of Parliament, the Littlehampton Harbour Act 1793 (33 Geo. 3. c. 100), was obtained by the harbour commissioners, as there was serious silting of the estuary. Groynes were constructed and the existing piers were made longer. In addition, a towpath was built from the mouth of the river up to Arundel. The act stated that the capital borrowed to finance the harbour under the previous act had been repaid, and that tolls would all be used for maintenance of the harbour and river up to Arundel, once further borrowings had been repaid. Because the inhabitants of Arundel had spent £28,300 on the harbour, boats which belonged to the port of Arundel did not have to pay any tolls. As a result of the works, the port of Arundel enjoyed its most prosperous period for the next thirty years, with ships of 200 and 300 tons able to reach the town on spring tides. Facilities improved, and there were four docks by 1840.

=== Operation ===
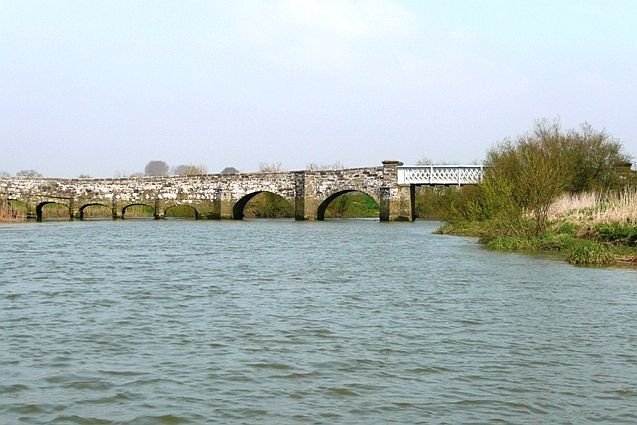
Greatham Bridge, with the navigable span on the extreme right

Payment of dividends to shareholders began in 1792, and over the next five years, tolls raised an average of £893 per year and the dividend was 3.1 per cent. At this time, George Wyndham, 3rd Earl of Egremont was buying shares and having obtained one third of them, he became chairman of the company. He then stopped the payment of dividends so that the borrowed capital could be paid off more quickly. Apart from an interim payment in 1821, dividends were not reinstated until 1830. In the 1790s Wyndham was responsible for the canalisation of the River Rother which joins the Arun at Stopham, and he also promoted the Wey and Arun Canal, which was seen as part of a larger scheme to link London to Portsmouth, an idea which had been contemplated several times since 1641. He chaired a meeting held at Guildford on 1 June 1811, at which it was decided to press ahead with the canal, and put up £20,000 of the initial £90,500 estimated cost. The canal opened in September 1816, but the estimated 100,000 tons of traffic passing between London and the dockyards at Portsmouth, and the 30,000 tons of local traffic, were far too optimistic, with actual traffic averaging around 15,000 tons per year throughout its life.

The London to Portsmouth route was to be completed by the Portsmouth and Arundel Canal, in which Wyndham and the Cutfields, who also held many shares in the Arun Navigation, were both significant subscribers. This was authorised by the Portsmouth and Arundel Navigation Act 1817 (57 Geo. 3. c. lxiii), and an agreement was reached that the Arun would be improved to aid through traffic. Nevertheless, no work commenced on the Arun until the proprietors were sure that the Ford section of the new canal would actually be built. Once they were convinced, they obtained the River Arun Navigation and Portsmouth and Arundel Navigation Act 1821 (1 & 2 Geo. 4. c. lxii) in May 1821, and the engineer James Hollingworth oversaw the improvements, which were completed in mid-1823. The work involved improving the depth and width of the channel, and some alterations to bridges and locks to make their size more uniform. The company borrowed £3000 to finance the work, which cost around £5000 in total. The loans had been repaid by 1831, and the work allowed barge sizes to be increased from 30 tons to 40 tons, with the result that business improved.

Traffic increased, as shown by the number of boats belonging to residents of Arundel. There were 13 in 1801, which had increased to 15 by 1803, with a total tonnage of 266. A timber merchant called John Boxold owned barges in 1815 and 1832, while in 1820, a company began running regular freight services to London, using three barges based near the town quay. By 1823 they had ten barges, which had reduced to seven by 1830, and barges ran twice-weekly to Chichester, London, Midhurst, and Petworth. The company was variously called Seward and Co., The Arundel Barge Co., and several other names.

=== Decline ===
From the 1840s, use of the river declined, as a result of competition from the railways, and changes in coastal shipping. Littlehampton grew in importance as a port and after years of resistance by the people of Arundel, the customs house was moved there in 1864. The Mid-Sussex Railway opened their line from Horsham to Pulborough and Petworth in 1859, which was extended to Ford and Littlehampton in 1863. Receipts from tolls had peaked at £2044 for the five years from 1835 to 1840, when a dividend of 11.8 percent was paid, but dropped quickly, raising just £389 for years between 1870 and 1875, when the dividend was 1 percent.

By 1852, the barge service to London only ran once a week, and it had ceased altogether three years later. Most vessels reaching Arundel were coasters rather than barges by 1886, and just 20 ships used the facilities that year. The Wey and Arun Canal closed in 1871. The proprietors of the upper river ceased to maintain the navigation from 1 January 1888, and the last barge passed through Hardham Tunnel on 29 January 1889. The river was abandoned as a navigation by a warrant issued as part of the Railway and Canal Traffic Act 1888. The River Lark in Suffolk was the only other river navigation abandoned at that time. The Board of Trade issued a closing order in 1896, and after that, there was no navigation authority responsible for the upper river. However, traffic did not cease entirely.

Fifteen or twenty barges were still using the river in the 1880s, although the upper reaches were no longer accessible. Arundel docks silted up between 1875 and 1896. In 1898, the London, Brighton and South Coast Railway, who by this time were the owners of the railway from Horsham to Littlehampton, drilled down into the tunnel where the main line and the branch to Midhurst crossed its course, and poured tons of chalk into the tunnel to stabilise it. A trade in chalk and lime extracted from Amberley chalk pits continued into the early twentieth century. Some ships were towed to Arundel by paddle tugs, and imports of salt, timber and coal for the gasworks continued. Arundel was visited by its last steamer in 1914, and the last sailing vessel to reach the port did so three years later. Passage of larger craft upstream was hindered by the construction of a swing bridge at Littlehampton in 1908, and prevented by a fixed railway bridge at Ford built in 1938. As freight traffic disappeared from the river, Edward Slaughter, who later became part of the company of Buller and Slaughter, was hiring pleasure craft by 1903, and the company was still doing so in the 1990s.

=== Present ===
Authority for the river remains much as it was after 1896, with the Littlehampton Harbour Board responsible for the section from the mouth up to Arundel Bridge, and no navigation authority for the river above that, although the Environment Agency have responsibility for its drainage functions. There are nine bridges with a minimum navigable headroom of between 8 feet (2.4 m) and 5 feet (1.5 m) at high water. The river is tidal to Pallingham Quay, 25.5 miles (41.0 km) upstream from the sea at Littlehampton, and flows at 4 to 6 knots (7.4 to 11.1 km/h), making it one of the fastest flowing rivers in the country. The tidal range at Littlehampton is 17 feet (5.2 m) at spring tides and 8.8 feet (2.7 m) at neap tides. High tide occurs 15 minutes later than high water at Dover, and high water at Pulborough is four hours later than at Littlehampton.

=== Charitable organisations ===
The Arun & Rother Rivers Trust (ARRT) is a charity set up in 2011 with objectives around education, fisheries, biodiversity, access and pollution amongst other issues.

The Wey and Arun Canal is being restored by the Wey and Arun Canal Trust, which was set up in the 1970s. The Wey and Arun Canal technically ended at Newbridge, but the restoration will include the Arun Navigation section down to Pallingham to reach the River Arun. For many years, the Solent and Arun Branch of the Inland Waterways Association organised an annual cruise on the river to ensure that the navigation rights were maintained. Responsibility for its organisation has now been passed to the Wey and Arun Canal Trust.

== Route ==
At 37 miles (60 km) from its source to the sea, the Arun is the longest of the rivers flowing entirely within Sussex. It rises as a series of streams, known locally as ghylls or gills, to the east of Horsham, in St Leonard's Forest. It flows westwards, along the southern boundary of Horsham and turns briefly to the north to skirt Broadbridge Heath. Continuing westwards, it is joined at Nowhurst by the North River, with its headstreams in the heights of Leith Hill and Holmbury Hill in Surrey. and whose feeder streams include the River Oke, Holden Brook and Standon Brook. After the junction, the Arun passes under the A29 road, which follows the route of the Roman Stane Street at this point, and timber piles of a Roman bridge have been found in the riverbed. The earthworks from a Roman station are close by. To the south of Rudgwick it is crossed by a disused railway line, and at this point it crosses the 66-foot (20 m) contour. Its course is marked by winding meanders as it turns towards the south, and the county boundary briefly follows its course, the River Lox / Loxwood Stream joins the Arun at Drungewick just before it is joined by the partially restored Wey and Arun Canal. Its former course to the west of the canal can be clearly seen, and is followed by the boundary, but the main flow of the river follows a new straight cut just to the east of the canal. Once the boundary crosses back over the canal, the river resumes its meandering course on the eastern side of the canal.

A little further to the south is another straight cut, with the old course still visible on the other side of the canal. Soon it reaches Newbridge on the A272 road near Wisborough Green. The location of the wharf which was the northern terminus of the Arun Navigation was just to the south of the bridge. Wharf Farm was nearby, and the modern 1:2500 Ordnance Survey map shows buildings named "The Old Wharf". Brockhurst Brook joins from the east before the river turns briefly westwards. Soon it is crossed by Orfold Aqueduct, which carried the Arun Navigation over the river channel. The River Kird joins it, flowing from the north, and it turns southwards again. At Pallingham the remains of Pallingham Manor are on the north bank, next to Pallingham Manor Farm, a 17th-century timber-framed farmhouse, which is Grade II listed. Pallingham Quay Farmhouse, another Grade II listed building dating from the 18th century, is on the west bank of the river just before its junction with the Arun Navigation cut. Below the junction, the river is tidal.

Continuing southwards, the river passes the gallops which are part of Coombelands Racing Stables, situated on the eastern bank, and Park Mount, a motte and bailey dating from the time of the Norman conquest. It is one of the best-preserved monuments of this type in south east England. The river is crossed by Stopham Bridge, a fine medieval stone bridge built in 1422–23. The centre arch was raised as part of the improvements made to the navigation in 1822. It is a Grade I listed structure, and also a Scheduled Ancient Monument. It was damaged by army lorries in the Second World War, but has been repaired, and the heavy traffic on the A283 road was diverted onto a new bridge just upstream of it in the 1980s.

Below the bridge is a small island, after which an artificial cut built to avoid the circuitous route of the River Rother Navigation heads westwards. The river now discharges over a weir at the site of the former Hardham corn mill to join the Arun a little further downstream, and the junction is followed by another small island. Hardham lock was necessary because of the drop in levels caused by the mill, and the branch through Hardham tunnel headed due south a little further up the Rother. Exploration of the tunnel was described by an article in Sussex County Magazine in 1953, when both ends were accessible, and again in 2012, when only the southern end was explored. A waterworks has been built over the bed of the canal at the northern end, and the tunnel mouth is within the site. The river continues in a large loop to the east. The Arun Valley railway line crosses it to reach Pulborough railway station. There is another island, with the A29 road crossing both channels. Pulborough Brooks nature reserve is to the east of the loop, and the course then meanders westwards to Greatham Bridge. The bridge consists of eight low elliptical arches, two taller arches, a cast iron span over the navigable channel, and a solid ramp to the east. Although its construction suggests that it is medieval, most of the arches were erected in 1827.

On the west bank of the river below the bridge is Waltham Brooks nature reserve. Coldwaltham lock, on the branch through the Hardham Tunnel, is still marked on modern maps, and the section from the lock to the river still holds water. Just to the north of Amberley, the river is crossed by the Arun Valley line again at Timberley Bridge. At the village of Bury, the West Sussex Literary Trail joins the western bank and another footpath joins the eastern bank. The next bridge is Houghton Bridge, close to Amberley railway station. The river splits into two channels here, and the bridge spans both. Similar to Greatham Bridge, it looks medieval, but was built in 1875. There is a solid section on the island between the channels, with a single arch over the eastern channel and four arches over the main river. The chalk pits which provided trade to the navigation are now the location of Amberley Museum & Heritage Centre, a 36-acre (15 ha) site with many items of industrial heritage on display.

The river follows an S-shaped course, the northern loop encircling the village of North Stoke and the south one encircling South Stoke. Immediately to the south, the old course passes under the railway line, but a new channel was cut to the west of the railway. On the west bank is the hamlet of Offham and Arundel Wetland Centre, a 65-acre (26 ha) haven for birds which is run by the Wildfowl & Wetlands Trust. The market town of Arundel is to the west of the river. It has a castle build on a motte, the construction of which was started in 1068. It is owned by the Duke and Duchess of Norfolk. The present building consists of many different components, dating from the late eleventh century through to the nineteenth, and is Grade I listed. Two bridges span the river here, the first on the original road through the town, while the second carries the A284 Arundel Bypass. The final section is crossed by a railway bridge, built in 1908, and the A259 road bridge, which carries the road into Littlehampton on the east bank. It discharges into the English Channel between the East and West Piers.

Littlehampton and its harbour were guarded from naval attack by Littlehampton Redoubt on the western bank at the mouth of the river, completed in 1854, which is now screened from the open sea by Climping sand dunes. This fort replaced a seven-gun battery on the east bank, which was built in 1764.

=== Crossings ===
- Littlehampton Harbour swing bridge
- A259 road, Littlehampton
- Ford railway station bridge
- A27 road, Arundel
- Queen Street Bridge, Arundel
- Unnamed road, Offham
- Unnamed road, South Stoke
- Houghton Bridge, Houghton/Amberley, Grade II listed
- South Downs Way, near Amberley
- Timberley Viaduct, north of Amberley
- Greatham Bridge, Parham/Greatham, Grade II listed and scheduled monument
- Old Swan Bridge, Coldwaltham/Pulborough, Grade II listed and scheduled monument
- A29 road (bypassing the Old Swan Bridge), Pulborough
- Pulborough railway station bridge
- Stopham Bridge, Pulborough/Stopham, Grade I listed and scheduled monument
- A283 road (bypassing Stopham Bridge), Stopham
- A272 road, near Billingshurst
- Drungewick Lane, near Loxwood

== Water quality ==
The Environment Agency measure the water quality of the river systems in England. Each is given an overall ecological status, which may be one of five levels: high, good, moderate, poor and bad. There are several components that are used to determine this, including biological status, which looks at the quantity and varieties of invertebrates, angiosperms and fish. Chemical status, which compares the concentrations of various chemicals against known safe concentrations, is rated good or fail.

The water quality of the River Arun system was as follows in 2019.

Section	Ecological Status	Chemical Status	Length	Catchment	Channel
Arun Source	Poor	Fail	9.8 miles (15.8 km)	16.72 square miles (43.3 km^{2})	
Boldings Brook	Poor	Fail	6.9 miles (11.1 km)	12.59 square miles (32.6 km^{2})	
Arun Horsham	Poor	Fail	4.5 miles (7.2 km)	7.01 square miles (18.2 km^{2})	
North River	Moderate	Fail	15.5 miles (24.9 km)	21.49 square miles (55.7 km^{2})	
Loxwood Stream	Poor	Fail	12.1 miles (19.5 km)	18.66 square miles (48.3 km^{2})	
Kird	Poor	Fail	16.5 miles (26.6 km)	26.91 square miles (69.7 km^{2})	
Arun (U/S Pallingham)	Moderate	Fail	21.1 miles (34.0 km)	33.75 square miles (87.4 km^{2})	
Arun downstream Pallingham Weir	Moderate	Fail	2.6 miles (4.2 km)	4.64 square miles (12.0 km^{2})	
Chilt	Moderate	Fail	3.3 miles (5.3 km)	4.19 square miles (10.9 km^{2})	
Stor	Moderate	Fail	3.1 miles (5.0 km)	7.75 square miles (20.1 km^{2})	
Black Ditch (W Sussex)	Poor	Fail	5.4 miles (8.7 km)	17.94 square miles (46.5 km^{2})	
Ryebank Rife	Moderate	Fail	4.6 miles (7.4 km)	5.09 square miles (13.2 km^{2})	
Arun	Moderate	Fail			heavily modified

The reasons for the quality being less than good include sewage discharge affecting most of the river, physical modification of the channel, and run-off of nutrients from agriculture and land management. Like most rivers in the UK, the chemical status changed from good to fail in 2019, due to the presence of polybrominated diphenyl ethers (PBDE), perfluorooctane sulphonate (PFOS) and mercury compounds, none of which had previously been included in the assessment.

== Points of interest ==
Point	Coordinates (Links to map resources)	OS Grid Ref	Notes
Source of Pyefall Gill	51.0755°N 0.2391°W	TQ234321	one of several tributary streams
Railway bridge in Horsham	51.0576°N 0.3294°W	TQ171300	
Junction with North River	51.0794°N 0.4048°W	TQ118323	
Course diverted when canal built	51.0636°N 0.4812°W	TQ065304	
Newbridge Wharf	51.0221°N 0.4772°W	TQ069258	Terminus of Arun Navigation
Lording's Aqueduct	51.0110°N 0.4927°W	TQ058245	carried navigation over river
Start of Arun Navigation	50.9824°N 0.5235°W	TQ037213	
Junction with River Rother Navigation	50.9535°N 0.5326°W	TQ031181	
North end of Hardham Tunnel branch	50.9504°N 0.5314°W	TQ032177	
Pulborough loop	50.9533°N 0.5033°W	TQ052181	
South end of Hardham Tunnel branch	50.9302°N 0.5452°W	TQ023155	
Amberley Quarry wharf	50.8965°N 0.5441°W	TQ024117	
Arundel wharfs	50.8531°N 0.5551°W	TQ018069	
Littlehampton Harbour piers	50.8001°N 0.5418°W	TQ028010	Jn with English Channel

== See also ==
- Rivers of the United Kingdom
- Geography of Sussex

== Bibliography ==
- Boyes, John; Russell, Ronald (1977). The Canals of Eastern England. David and Charles. ISBN 978-0-7153-7415-3.
- Cumberlidge, Jane (2009). Inland Waterways of Great Britain (8th Ed.). Imray Laurie Norie and Wilson. ISBN 978-1-84623-010-3.
- Ekwall, Eilert (1968). English River-Names. Oxford University Press. ISBN 978-0198691198.
- Goodsall, Robert H (1962). The Arun and Western Rother. London: Constable. ISBN 978-9999000208.
- Hadfield, Charles (1969). The Canals of South and South-East England. David and Charles. ISBN 0-7153-4693-8.
- Hillier, J (1951). Old Surrey Watermills. London: Skeffington and Son [ISBN unspecified].
- Hudson, T P, ed. (1977). A History of the County of Sussex: Volume 5 Part 1: Arundel Rape: south-western part, including Arundel. Victoria County History. ISBN 978-0-19-722781-7.
- Ikins, Thomas G. (2007). "The Roman Map of Britain". Archived from the original on 8 September 2013.
- Marshall, A G; Norris, W (1953). "Canoeing under Sussex". Sussex County Magazine. 128. Archived from the original on 4 January 2014.
- Morton, Brian (c. 2007). The historical ecology of the River Arun and its beaches at Littlehampton, West Sussex: 1,000 years of change. The Ray Society. Vol. 169. London: The Ray Society. ISBN 978-0-903874-40-3. also published by Scion Pub., Bloxham, Oxfordshire, UK, [2007]
- Priestley, Joseph (1831). "Historical Account of the Navigable Rivers, Canals and Railways of Great Britain". Archived from the original on 13 March 2016.
- Vine, P.A.L. (1986). London's Lost Route to the Sea. David and Charles. ISBN 978-0-7153-8778-8.
- Vine, P.A.L. (1995). London's Lost Route to Midhurst, The Earl of Egremont's Navigation. Sutton Publishing. ISBN 978-0-7509-0968-6.
- Vine, P.A.L. (2007). The Arun Navigation. Tempus Publishing. ISBN 978-0-7524-4323-2.
- Whittington, Jim (January 2012). Going Underground - Hardham Tunnel. Waterways World. ISSN 0309-1422.
