= West Burton =

West Burton refers to more than one place in England:

- West Burton, Nottinghamshire
- West Burton, North Yorkshire
- West Burton, West Sussex
- West Burton power stations
