= British Lawn Mower Racing Association =

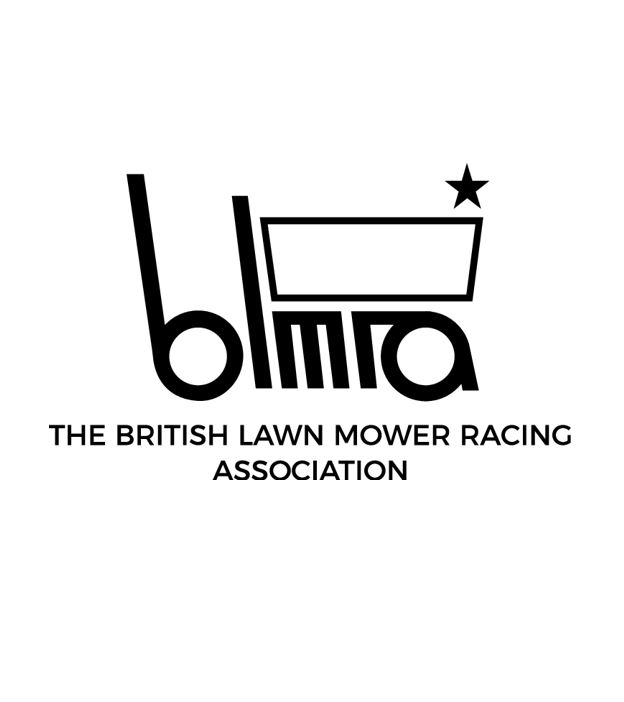
- Abbreviation: BLMRA
- Formation: 1973; 53 years ago
- Founder: Jim Gavin
- Founded at: Wisborough Green, West Sussex, England
- Type: Sports governing body
- Purpose: Regulation and promotion of lawn mower racing in the UK
- Headquarters: United Kingdom
- President: Pete Hammerton
- Website: www.blmra.co.uk

The British Lawn Mower Racing Association (BLMRA) is the governing body for lawn mower racing in the United Kingdom, an informal motorsport in which competitors race modified ride-on lawn mowers with safety blades removed. Founded in 1973 by Irish rally co-driver Jim Gavin in Wisborough Green, West Sussex, the organisation oversees championships, endurance events and grassroots competitions across the UK. It is best known for hosting the annual 12-hour lawn mower endurance race, its flagship event.

The main objectives of the BLMRA are to ensure no sponsorship, no commercialism, no cash prizes and no modifying of engines in lawnmower racing in the UK. This brought costs down significantly and resulted in lawn mower racing being described by Motor Sport News as "the cheapest form of motorsport in the U.K." The BLMRA is a non-profit organization, and any profits are donated to charity.

== History ==
The BLMRA was formed in 1973 by rally co-driver Jim Gavin. Gavin and a group of fellow sporting enthusiasts, frustrated by the high costs of motorsport, looked across the village green in Wisborough Green, West Sussex, and noticed the groundsman mowing the cricket pitch. Realizing most people owned a lawn mower, they decided to race them. A local venue was found, and 80 mowers attended the first meeting.

After the inaugural event the sport grew across the UK, with races taking place in regions including Wales, Norfolk, Yorkshire, and Sussex. Events are typically held from May through October and include the British Championship, the British Grand Prix, the Endurance Championship, and the 12-Hour Endurance Race, the organisation’s flagship event. Sir Stirling Moss has won both the British Grand Prix and the 12-Hour Race while Derek Bell, a five-time Le Mans winner and two-time World Sports Car Champion, won the 12-Hour Race twice, once alongside Moss.

=== Notable Participants and Records ===
Several prominent figures have taken part in, or been associated with, BLMRA events. British actor Oliver Reed lived locally and regularly entered a team. The association also appears in the Guinness Book of Records for achievements including the fastest lawn mower over a set distance and the longest distance covered in 12 hours.

Other notable participants include Murray Walker, Alan de Cadenet; John Barnard, the Ferrari F1 designer; as well as British sportsmen Phil Tuffnell and Jason Gillespie, and motorcycle racers Chris Evans, Guy Martin, and Karl Harris. John Hindhaugh, a commentator for Radio Le Mans, has also been present at events.

== Events ==
The BLMRA organises many races throughout the year running from May to October. They include:

=== British Championship ===
The British Championship is held annually over multiple race days. Each of the four competition groups has its own championship with two races scheduled per day. Group 2 races last 15 minutes or 15 laps, whichever is longer, while Group 3 and 4 races last 20 minutes or 20 laps. Points are awarded on a 25–18–15–12–10–8–6–4–2–1 basis, with 25 points for a win.

=== World Championship ===
The World Championship is held over a two-day weekend. Each group competes in a series of heats across both days and all points counting towards the overall championship. The driver with the most points overall is declared the World Champion.

=== British Grand Prix ===
The British Grand Prix format varies by year, but currently consists of a 30-minute race on each day of the event, with an overall winner determined at the end.

=== 12-Hour Endurance Race ===
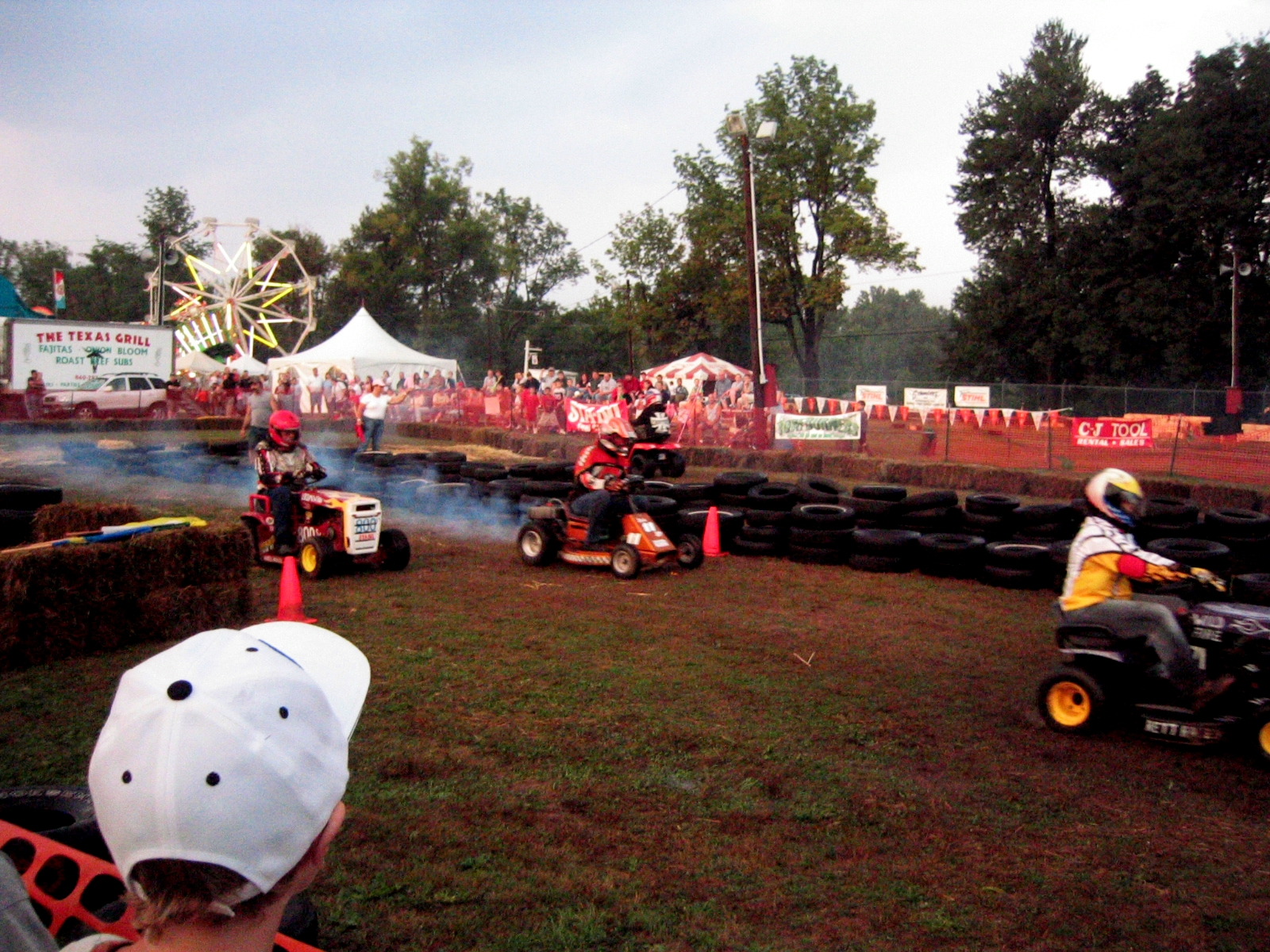
The 2005 12 Hour Endurance Race

The 12-Hour Endurance Race is the BLMRA's flagship event. Held during the summer, the race begins at 8:00 pm on Saturday and concludes at 8:00 am on Sunday, with teams of three drivers competing. It is both a standalone event and part of the Endurance Championship. Each team is assigned a unique race number for the event. The first such event was won by Sir Stirling Moss, Derek Bell and Tony Hazlewood (designer and builder of the Westwood Lawnbug). Actor Oliver Reed also participated. The event attracts participants from other British clubs and from all over the world, including competitors from France, Belgium, Germany, Luxembourg, Finland and the United States. 2018 saw the win taken by an overseas entrant for the first time in the event's history when it was won by a team from Luxembourg. The current distance record over the 12 hours sits at 354.5 miles.

=== Cross Country ===
The Cross Country event does not occur every year. It takes place over extensive countryside including obstacles such as water, jumps and hedges. It covers approximately 30 acres of private land.

== See also ==
- Lawn mower Racing
- Rallying
