= River Kird =

River in West Sussex, England

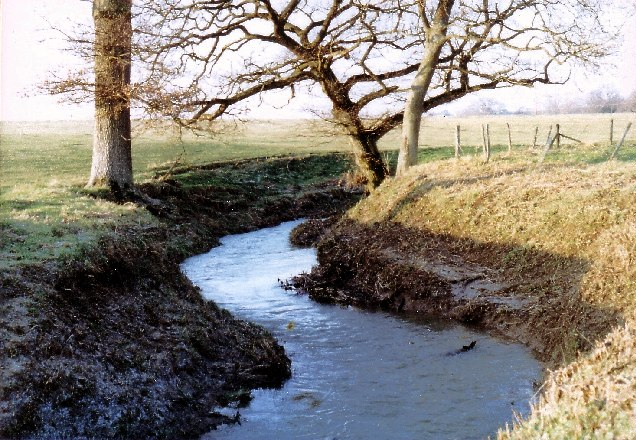
- The river in 1982

Location
- Country: United Kingdom
- County: West Sussex
- District: Chichester District

Physical characteristics
- Source
  - location: Kirdford
- Mouth: River Arun
  - location: Wisborough Green
  - coordinates: 51°00′41″N 0°29′47″W

The River Kird is a river located in the Chichester District of West Sussex, England that is a tributary to the River Arun. It is located in South Downs National Park.

== Course ==
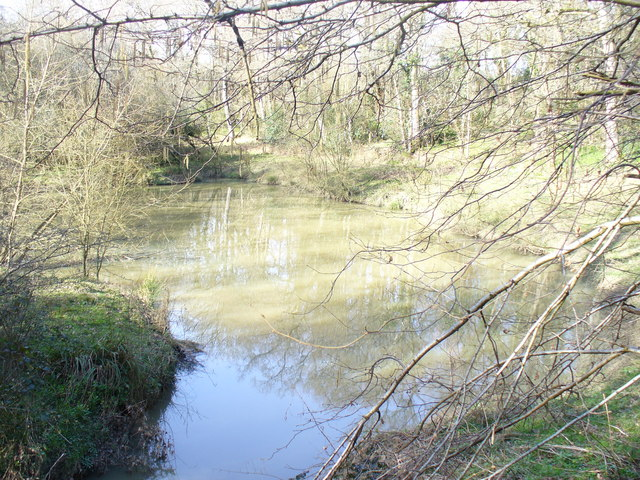
Boxal Brook, which flows into the River Kird in Wisborough Green

Located entirely in the Chichester District of West Sussex, England, the river rises in the western Weald – an area of undulating countryside – north of Kirdford, and flows south-east until it reaches Kirdford, at which point it flows eastwards; in Wisborough Green, the river receives the waters of Boxal Brook then resumes its south-easterly course before flowing into the River Arun.

== Flora and fauna ==
The river lies in the western Weald, an area of undulating countryside containing a mixture of woodland and heathland areas. A 2017 study by Dr. Alison Barker FRES recorded eight species of damselfly and eleven species of dragonfly that inhabited the river.

== Pollution ==
In December 2013, a high level of ammonia pollution was found in the river by Kirkford, which was deadly to the river's fish. In September 2016, a dairy farm was ordered to pay an £8,000 fine for letting effluent pollute a 13 km (8.1 mi) stretch of the river.
