= Derrick Somerset Macnutt =

British crossword compiler (1902–1971)

- Born: Derrick Somerset Macnutt; 29 March 1902; Eastbourne, East Sussex, England
- Died: 29 June 1971 (aged 69); Five Oaks, West Sussex, England
- Education: Marlborough College
- Occupations: School master, crossword compiler
- Spouse: Mary Long (m. 1936)
- Children: 3

Derrick Somerset Macnutt (29 March 1902 – 29 June 1971) was a British crossword compiler who provided crosswords for The Observer newspaper under the pseudonym Ximenes. His main oeuvre was blocked-grid and "specialty" puzzles. Even though he only provided conventional blocked puzzles once a week for the Observer Everyman series for about two years, his strong views on clueing, expressed in his 1966 book, have been a source of debate in the cryptic crossword world ever since.

== Background ==
Macnutt was born at Eastbourne in Sussex and was educated at Marlborough College before achieving a Double First in classics at Jesus College, Cambridge.

== Career ==
Between 1928 and 1963, Macnutt held the position of Head of Classics at Christ's Hospital near Horsham, West Sussex, as well as being a housemaster. The historian Norman Longmate wrote that he was the "James Boyer of his day, a notable teacher of the classics, respected, even liked, by his older pupils, dreaded by the younger boys, a bully and a brute". At the school he was widely known for the pleasure he obtained from caning the boys in his charge.

In 1939, he took over the position of crossword compiler for The Observer on the death of Edward Powys Mathers, who had written under the name of "Torquemada". Macnutt selected the name Ximenes after Francisco Jiménez de Cisneros, one of Torquemada's successors as Grand Inquisitor of the Spanish Inquisition. He pronounced 'Ximenes' in an Anglicised fashion, /ˈzɪməniːz/.

His crossword style was initially in imitation of Torquemada, but was soon influenced by the inventive puzzles of Alistair Ferguson Ritchie who wrote as Afrit in The Listener.

From 1943, he was also a contributor to The Listener, writing crosswords under the pseudonym Tesremos – his middle name spelled backwards.

== Personal life and death ==
In 1936, Macnutt married Mary Long; they had three children and lived at Five Oaks, near Billingshurst, West Sussex.

Macnutt died from a heart attack at his home on 29 June 1971, aged 69. Puzzle 1200, his final crossword to be published, appeared in 1972. In line with his wishes, he was succeeded by Jonathan Crowther, who writes under the name Azed.

== Influence ==
As Ximenes, Macnutt's puzzles gained an enthusiastic following. His many fans organised dinners on the occasion of his puzzles number 100, 250, 500, 750 and 1000, with the 1968 dinner hosting nearly 400 solvers. His followers, known as Ximeneans, often sported a specially designed black tie covered in small white crosses.

Well-known Ximeneans include Stephen Sondheim, P. G. Wodehouse, and Leonard Bernstein. Colin Dexter, author of the Inspector Morse books, named his most famous characters after two prize-winning Ximeneans, Sir Jeremy Morse and Mrs D. W. Lewis, and he named Morse's old Inspector Macnutt. In Rex Stout's Might as Well Be Dead (1956), detective Nero Wolfe is said to be working on a puzzle by Ximenes.

In his 1966 book, Ximenes on the Art of the Crossword (reissued 2001), he laid down rules that he claimed should be present in all good crosswords. These are now known as the "Ximenean principles". They include using a symmetric grid, and the specification of maximum and minimum numbers of "unches" (unchecked letters i.e. ones that only appear in one word in the grid) for a given length of answer. More importantly, he insisted that all clues must be scrupulously fair via rules that were summed up by his successor, Azed, as:

A good cryptic clue contains three elements:

1. a precise definition
2. a fair subsidiary indication
3. nothing else

He made a number of innovations in crossword setting such as the special clue/puzzle types 'Misprints' and 'Right and Left'.
