= Azed =

Crossword in The Observer

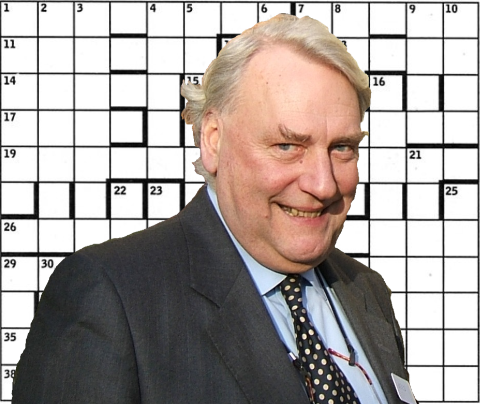
Azed (Jonathan Crowther) in 2005.

Azed is a crossword which appears every Sunday in The Observer newspaper. Since it first appeared in March 1972, every puzzle has been composed by Jonathan Crowther who also judges the monthly clue-writing competition. The pseudonym Azed is a reversal of (Fray Diego de) Deza, a Spanish inquisitor general. This combines the inquisitorial tradition of Torquemada and Ximenes (the two previous composers of the "advanced" Observer crossword) with the wordplay element of a British cryptic crossword.

It challenges its followers with a much higher proportion of obscure and archaic words and allusions to the Classics than would normally be found in a modern blocked puzzle, thus providing an extra aspect of difficulty for the seasoned cryptic solver.

The 2000th Azed puzzle was published on 26 September 2010. The 500th competition puzzle was published on 1 August 2010.

== The puzzle ==
The puzzle's barred grid signals a more extensive vocabulary than that of the usual cryptic crossword. Up to half of the answers may be "dictionary words" and its standard reference, The Chambers Dictionary, is an essential aid for most solvers. However, a much lower percentage of unchecked letters – those that appear in only one answer – helps to alleviate this, as does the rigour with which the clues are constructed. Azed is a strict Ximenean, a stickler for grammatical and syntactical soundness in clues. This precision assists both the discovery of the right answer and the solver's confidence that it is correct. As is common with barred puzzles, when the solution is published it is accompanied by short notes to explain how the more difficult answers were derived from their clues.

At approximately six-weekly intervals, the crossword is a "special". In these there are special rules for solving the clues or entering the answers into the diagram. Many are composed to mark particular events and often use devices from other standard specials.

== The competition ==
The clue-writing competitions, first started by Ximenes, take place on the first Sunday of each month and at Christmas. To enter, solvers must complete the grid correctly and submit it with a cryptic clue of their own devising. For a plain puzzle, the clue-word is indicated by a simple definition. If the competition puzzle is a special, finding the clue-word may be part of the puzzle and frequently the submitted clue has to conform to the puzzle's particular conventions.

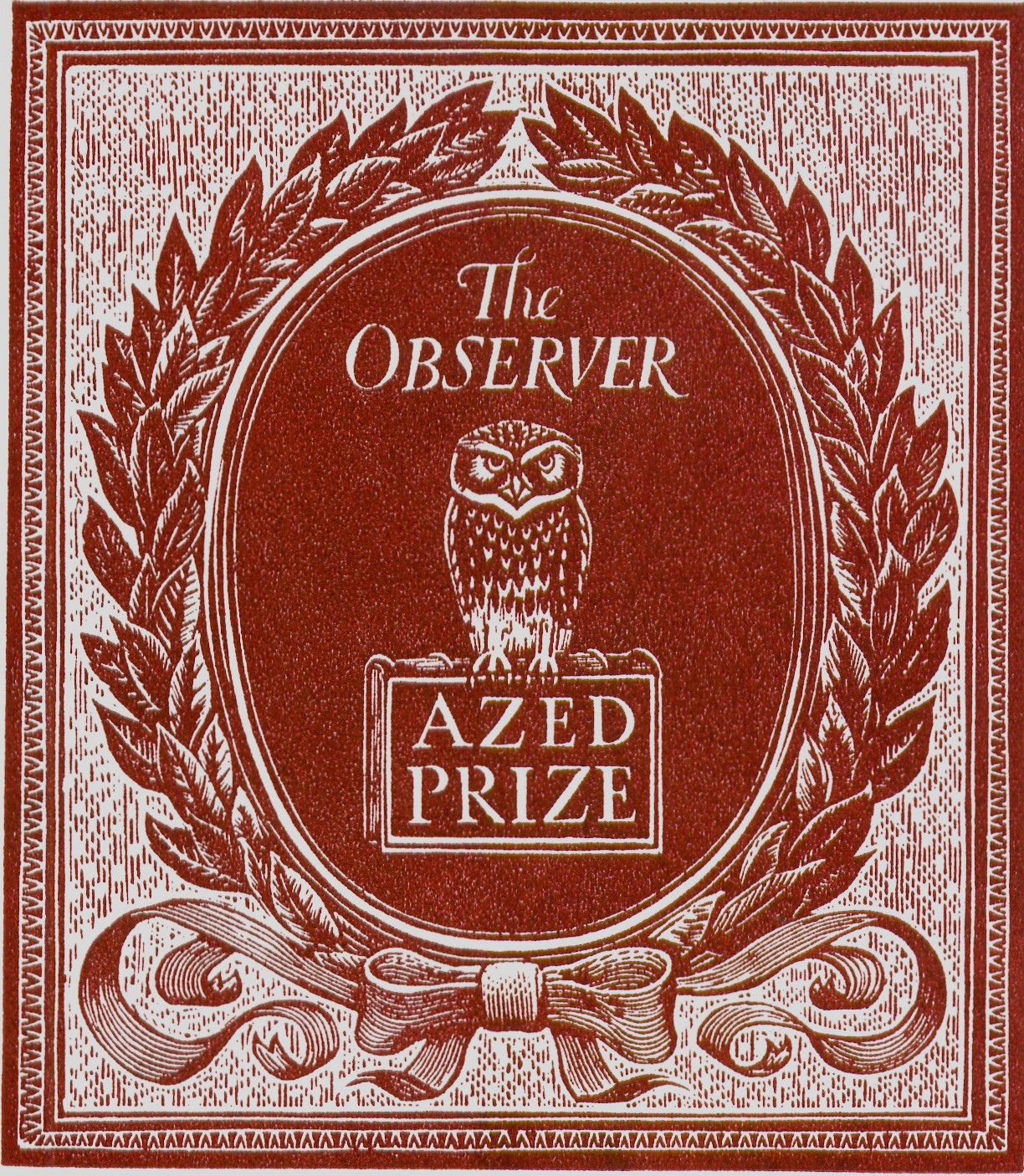
Azed Prize Bookplate (Reg Boulton design)

The competition results are announced three weeks later. There are three prizes, each of a book token and an Azed bookplate, and the names of the prizewinners are published together with their clues. A further twenty or so names appear below – these solvers' clues have been "Very Highly Commended" (VHC). The First Prize winner is also sent the Azed Instant Victor Verborum Cup to hold for a month before passing it on to the next winner. ("Instant" here means "of this month", as in "the 3rd instant".) For the Christmas Competition, the VHCs also receive prizes.

On non-competition weeks, book tokens are awarded to three solvers selected at random from the submitted grids.

Every year an "Honours List" is published showing the most consistent clue-writers over the course of the year. Each prize-winning clue earns its writer two points and each VHC clue one; clue-writers do not receive points for HC clues. Annual champions are entrusted with a silver salver for the length of their reign, before passing the trophy on to the next winner. Any competitor who has scored four points or more without receiving a prize gets a consolation prize. Currently, the Azed year commences in September and concludes in August.

== The Azed Slip ==
The Azed Slip presents all the VHC clues in full and adds the names of about fifty "Highly Commended" solvers whose clues did not quite make it to the VHCs.. After the lists come Azed's comments, in which he may respond to reader comments, or reveal the problems that month's competitors experienced, often using anonymous unsound submissions to illustrate his points. He also gives news of forthcoming cruciverbal events or publications, and deaths of long-standing competitors. Described in Chambers Crossword Manual as "Azed's Clue-writing School ", the slip has had a great influence on standards of cluemanship.

== Annual champions ==
| Year | Champion | Prizes | VHCs | Points | Year | Champion | Prizes | VHCs | Points |
|---|---|---|---|---|---|---|---|---|---|
| 1972–73 | N. C. Dexter | 2 | 5 | 9 | 1993–94 | D. F. Manley | 2 | 9 | 13 |
| 1972–73 | L. F. Leeson | 3 | 3 | 9 | 1994–95 | C. R. Gumbrell | 3 | 7 | 13 |
| 1972–73 | R. J. Palmer | 2 | 5 | 9 | 1995–96 | C. J. Morse | 4 | 6 | 14 |
| 1973–74 | C. Allen Baker | 1 | 8 | 10 | 1996–97 | C. J. Morse | 2 | 10 | 14 |
| 1973–74 | C. O. Butcher | 2 | 6 | 10 | 1997–98 | C. R. Gumbrell | 3 | 8 | 14 |
| 1973–74 | F. R. Palmer | 0 | 10 | 10 | 1998–99 | C. R. Gumbrell | 2 | 10 | 14 |
| 1974–75 | J. R. Kirby | 2 | 6 | 10 | 1999–2000 | C. R. Gumbrell | 3 | 7 | 13 |
| 1975–76 | F. R. Palmer | 3 | 6 | 12 | 2000–01 | C. R. Gumbrell | 1 | 11 | 13 |
| 1976–77 | D. F. Manley | 2 | 7 | 11 | 2001–02 | D. F. Manley | 2 | 10 | 14 |
| 1976–77 | W. K. M. Slimmings | 1 | 9 | 11 | 2002–03 | C. R. Gumbrell | 1 | 11 | 13 |
| 1977–78 | C. J. & R. S. Morse | 3 | 5 | 11 | 2003–04 | D. F. Manley | 2 | 10 | 14 |
| 1978–79 | F. R. Palmer | 4 | 4 | 12 | 2004–05 | N. C. Dexter | 3 | 5 | 11 |
| 1979–80 | N. C. Dexter | 3 | 5 | 11 | 2004–05 | D. F. Manley | 2 | 7 | 11 |
| 1979–80 | D. F. Manley | 0 | 11 | 11 | 2004–05 | T. J. Moorey | 3 | 5 | 11 |
| 1979–80 | R. J. Palmer | 3 | 5 | 11 | 2005–06 | M. Barley | 3 | 8 | 14 |
| 1980–81 | C. J. Morse | 1 | 8 | 10 | 2006–07 | M. Barley | 2 | 9 | 13 |
| 1981–82 | D. F. Manley | 2 | 9 | 13 | 2007–08 | R. J. Heald | 4 | 8 | 16 |
| 1982–81 | D. F. Manley | 1 | 8 | 10 | 2007–08 | T. J. Moorey | 4 | 8 | 16 |
| 1983–84 | D. F. Manley | 1 | 8 | 10 | 2008–09 | J. C. Leyland | 4 | 6 | 14 |
| 1984–85 | R. J. Hooper | 2 | 8 | 12 | 2009–10 | J. C. Leyland | 3 | 8 | 14 |
| 1985–86 | R. J. Hooper | 2 | 9 | 13 | 2009–10 | D. F. Manley | 2 | 10 | 14 |
| 1986–87 | E. J. Burge | 2 | 6 | 10 | 2010–11 | R. J. Heald | 5 | 7 | 17 |
| 1986–87 | N. C. Dexter | 2 | 6 | 10 | 2011–12 | M. Barley | 2 | 8 | 12 |
| 1987–88 | M. Barley | 2 | 6 | 10 | 2011–12 | D. F. Manley | 3 | 6 | 12 |
| 1988–89 | D. F. Manley | 2 | 10 | 14 | 2012–13 | R. J. Heald | 2 | 11 | 15 |
| 1989–90 | F. R. Palmer | 2 | 7 | 11 | 2013–14 | C. J. Morse | 3 | 9 | 15 |
| 1990–91 | R. J. Hooper | 3 | 5 | 11 | 2014–15 | M. Barley | 3 | 9 | 15 |
| 1991–92 | D. F. Manley | 5 | 4 | 14 | 2015–16 | M. Barley | 3 | 8 | 14 |
| 1992–93 | D. F. Manley | 3 | 5 | 11 | 2015–16 | R. J. Heald | 2 | 10 | 14 |
