= Jonathan Crowther =

British crossword compiler

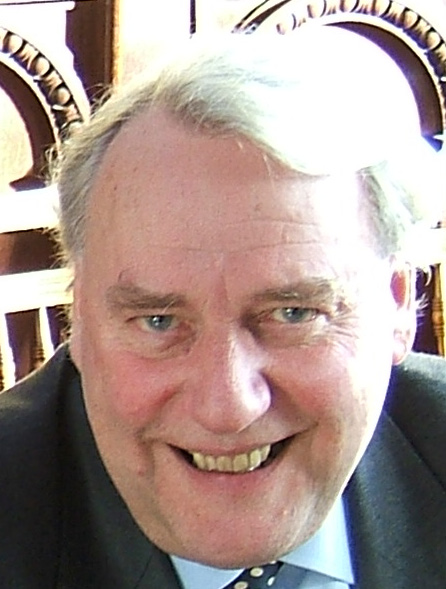
Jonathan Crowther at the Azed 1750 Luncheon

Jonathan Crowther is a British crossword compiler who has for over 50 years composed the Azed cryptic crossword in The Observer Sunday newspaper. He was voted "best British crossword setter" in a poll of crossword setters conducted by The Sunday Times in 1991 and in the same year was chosen as "the crossword compilers' crossword compiler" in The Observer Magazine "Experts' Expert" feature.

== Career ==
He was born in Liverpool on 24 September 1942, the son of a doctor, and grew up in Kirkby Lonsdale in the Lake District. He was educated at Rugby School before going on to read classics and classical philology at Corpus Christi College, Cambridge. From there, in 1964, he joined Oxford University Press and he worked for them in India, London, and Oxford, until his retirement in early 2000. His final position was as a lexicographer writing dictionaries for foreign students of English. Married with two sons, he lives in Oxford.

Encouraged by his father, Jonathan enjoyed solving crosswords from an early age. He began to regularly solve Ximenes' puzzles while still at Rugby, and "just lived for Sundays" thereafter. His first puzzles to be published were in the university weekly newspaper, Varsity, under the pseudonym Gong and after leaving university he started submitting to The Listener. They published sixteen Gong puzzles between June 1965 and February 1972. He continued to be a Ximenes competitor until Ximenes' death in 1971.

When appointed as Ximenes' successor, he decided to adopt a new pseudonym. His two predecessors had taken theirs from Spanish inquisitors-general but none of the remaining names seemed suitably impressive. However, reversing the last name of one, Diego de Deza, gave Azed, which (to British ears at least) resembles the first and last letters of the alphabet. This kind of letter manipulation and word reversal are integral parts of a cryptic crossword. Azed No. 1 appeared in The Observer in March 1972, with Azed following his predecessor Ximenes in holding monthly clue-writing competitions. These still continue and in the monthly "slip", he gives details of each competition and discusses points of technique and more general interest relating to his puzzles. He relishes the dialogue the competitions generate and many regular solvers have become his friends. Glimpses into his private life can be found among the technical comments – for example, he is very interested in cricket and less so in football, he took part in a performance of Haydn's Nelson Mass at Radley College, and one of his sons is a rock musician.

== Tastes and technique ==
Proudly Ximenean in his crossword philosophy, he favours puzzles whose setters have similar ideas (Dimitry, Duck and Phi, for example). Though he may not always approve of some accompanying clues, he praises the ingenuity of construction of the specialised thematic crosswords in the Times Listener series, the Crossword Club magazine, and 1 Across. He himself is responsible for a number of the "special" formats which have appeared regularly in the Azed series. These include Cherchez la Femme, Eightsome Reels, Give and Take, Overlaps, and Spoonerisms. Ideas for such specials may strike him anywhere but Thames-side walks with his dog have been especially productive.

His methods of crossword composition are traditional. Many setters use computer programs to fill in one of the standardised grids imposed on them by their newspapers but Azed does not. The Observer has always allowed him freedom in construction and he strives to make interesting and varied diagrams. The grid comes first, drawn in pencil in an exercise book with squared paper. Then the bars at the end of each word are inked in for clarity. Then he chooses his words. The Chambers Dictionary is consulted, together with Chambers WORDS and Chambers BACKWORDS to find combinations that will fit into the grid. Finally, the clues are composed in the order that the words appear in the grid, starting with the first Across clue. He deliberately avoids tackling the most interesting-looking words first. He feels that to do that leaves a morass of drab-looking words at the end, quite likely receiving lifeless clues to match. When cluing, Chambers Thesaurus is a standard aid, assisted by a wide variety of reference books (many now out of print) which he has accumulated over the years. Composing a plain crossword takes him four to five hours, spread across a week. His specials can take considerably longer.

He also sets occasional puzzles under the pseudonym Ozymandias – "Look on my works, ye Mighty, and despair!".

He believes that "the whole business about the setting and solving of crosswords is that it is a battle of minds – a tussle of wits between the setter and the solver. The solver should win but not without a bit of a struggle"

== Bibliography ==
Azed Book of Crosswords, Latimer (1975), SBN 901 539 39 2, reissued as The World's Most Difficult Crosswords by Pantheon (1976 )

Elementary Crosswords for Learners of English as a Foreign Language, OUP Japan (1980), ISBN 0-19-581750-8

Intermediate Crosswords for Learners of English as a Foreign Language, OUP Japan (1980), ISBN 0-19-581751-6, ISBN 978-0-19-581751-5

Advanced Crosswords for Learners of English as a Foreign Language, OUP Japan (1981), ISBN 0-19-581752-4, ISBN 978-0-19-581752-2

Introductory crosswords for Learners of English as a Foreign Language, Oxford University Press (1983), ASIN: B0007B5BTM

Lost for Words, as Ozymandias, with cartoons by Jon, Angus and Robertson (1988), ISBN 0-207-16002-3

Best of Azed Crosswords, Chambers (1989), ISBN 0-550-19030-9, ISBN 978-0-550-19030-7

Observer Azed Crosswords, Chambers (1991), ISBN 0-550-19032-5, ISBN 978-0-550-19032-1

Oxford Advanced Learner's Dictionary of Current English, Co-editor, various editions (OUP Oxford)

Making the most of dictionaries in the classroom: A guide for teachers of English (Oxford Advanced Learner's Dictionary, Oxford Wordpower Dictionary) (ELT) co-authored with Sally Wehmeier, Oxford University Press (1994), ISBN 0-19-470221-9, ISBN 978-0-19-470221-8

Indian and British English: A Handbook of Usage and Pronunciation, Co-author, Oxford University Press; 2nd Ed edition (2004), ISBN 0-19-566656-9, ISBN 978-0-19-566656-4

Chambers Book of Azed Crosswords, Chambers Harrap (2005) ISBN 0-550-10192-6, ISBN 978-0-550-10192-1

The Best Of Azed, Guardian Books (2005), ISBN 1-84354-253-6, ISBN 978-1-84354-253-7

Oxford Guide to British and American Culture, OUP Oxford; Rev Ed edition (2005), ISBN 0-19-431129-5, ISBN 978-0-19-431129-8

The Art of the Crossword Setter – essay in Chambers Crossword Dictionary (2nd edition, Chambers 2006), Chambers Concise Crossword Dictionary (2nd edition, Chambers 2005), and Chambers Crossword Companion (Chambers 2007)

A to Z of Crosswords, Collins (2006) ISBN 0-00-722923-2, ISBN 978-0-00-722923-9
