= U.S. Lawn Mower Racing Association =

- Sport: Lawn mower racing
- Jurisdiction: United States
- Abbreviation: USLMRA
- Founded: 1992
- Headquarters: Chicago, Illinois
- President: Bruce Kaufman

Official website
- www.letsmow.com
- (United States)

The U.S. Lawnmower Racing Association (USLMRA) is the governing body for lawnmower racing in the United States. The organization is based in Chicago, Illinois. Its founder and president is Bruce Kaufman.

== History ==
The lawnmower racing in the United States began in the early 1970s.

In 1992, the makers of STA-BIL fuel stabilizer approached USLMRA founder Bruce Kaufman with the idea of lawn mower racing to promote their product. Kaufman organized the first race as an April Fools' Day promotion. Sponsored by STA-BIL, the USLMRA went on to organize races that gained national attention.

The USLMRA sanctions races in the STA-BIL National Lawn Mower Racing Series and those run by local chapters across the U.S. As of 2003, the organization had over 400 members.
