= Jeremy Morse =

UK banker and adacemic administrator (1928–2016)

Sir Jeremy Morse KCMG

6th Chancellor of the University of Bristol
- In office 1989–2003
- President: Sir John Kingman; Sir Eric Thomas
- Preceded by: Dorothy Hodgkin
- Succeeded by: The Baroness Hale of Richmond

Personal details
- Born: Christopher Jeremy Morse; 10 December 1928 London, England
- Died: 4 February 2016 (aged 87) London, England
- Spouse: Belinda Mills (m. 1955)
- Children: 5
- Education: New College, Oxford

Sir Christopher Jeremy Morse KCMG (10 December 1928 – 4 February 2016) was an English banker, cruciverbalist and chess composer who was Chancellor of the University of Bristol from 1989 to 2003, and was chairman of Lloyds Bank.

== Early life and education ==
Morse was born in Kensington, London, in 1928, the only son (he had a younger sister) of Francis John Morse, of Lenwade House, Norwich, and his wife, Kinbarra, daughter of barrister Edward Armfield-Marrow. Francis John Morse, the second son of Sir George Henry Morse, a brewer and Lord Mayor of Norwich from 1922 to 1923, was from a junior branch of the landed gentry Morse family of Lound, Suffolk. The family were Quakers.

Morse was educated at West Downs School and Winchester College. He went on to attend New College, Oxford, after completing two years of national service with the 60th Rifles in Mandatory Palestine.

== Career ==
A career banker, Morse began with Williams and Glyn's Bank and went on to be chairman of Lloyds Bank between 1977 and 1993; assuming the role at age 48, he was the youngest head of a clearing bank. He served on the Board of the Bank of England as an executive director from 1965 to 1972, and as a non-executive from 1993 to 1997. He was also the first Chairman of the International Monetary Fund's Committee of Twenty (C20). In the 1975 New Year Honours, he was appointed Knight Commander of the Order of St Michael and St George (KCMG) "for services to the reform of the international monetary system".

He had a keen interest in cryptic crosswords and was a skilful writer of clues. His record of success in the clue-writing competitions of Ximenes and Azed was such that Azed's December 2008 Competition puzzle was dedicated to the occasion of his eightieth birthday. He had puzzles published under the pseudonym "Esrom" (his surname in reverse).

In addition to crosswords, Morse had an interest in other types of word puzzles, and was a frequent contributor to Word Ways: The Journal of Recreational Linguistics. He was also a chess writer and wrote a book called Chess Problems: Tasks and Records.

Colin Dexter's fictional detective, Inspector Morse, was named after him.

In 2006 Morse was awarded the title of World Federation for Chess Composition Honorary Master.

He was an honorary fellow of New College, Oxford, and of All Souls College, Oxford.

== Personal life ==
In 1955, Morse married Belinda Marianne Mills, the daughter of Lt-Colonel Robert Breynton Yarnton Mills, OBE, MC, of the landed gentry Mills family of Sudgrove; they had three sons and two daughters (one of whom died from leukaemia at the age of four).

Morse died from complications of jaw cancer at Royal Trinity Hospice in London on 4 February 2016, at the age of 87.

Academic offices
Preceded by Dorothy Hodgkin	Chancellor of the University of Bristol; 1989–2003	Succeeded by The Baroness Hale of Richmond
