= Old Swan Bridge, Pulborough =

Bridge in England

Old Swan Bridge
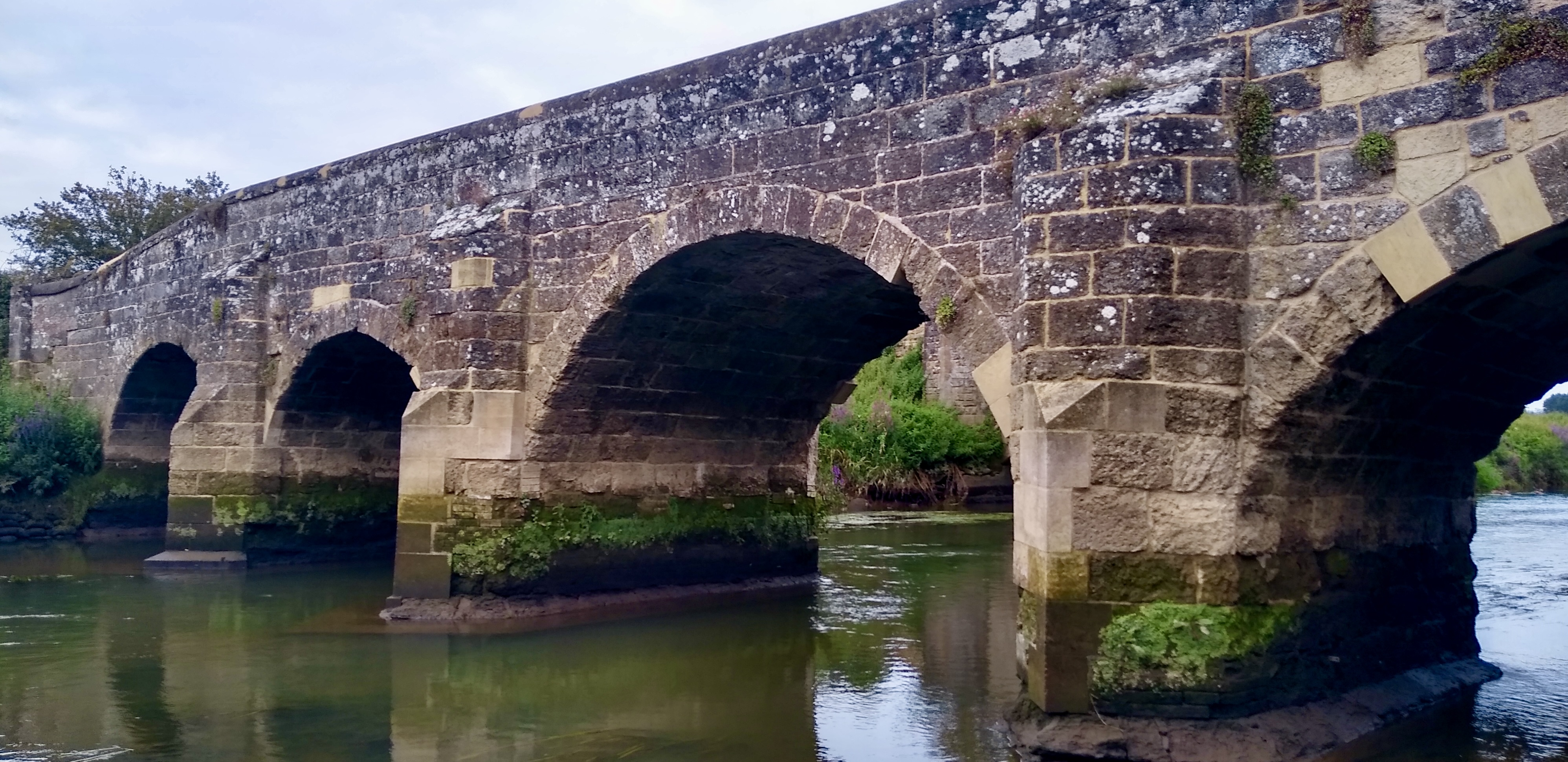
- Coordinates: 50.956279°N 0.512121°W
- Carries: A29 road
- Crosses: River Arun
- Heritage status: Grade II listed building; scheduled monument

Location
- Interactive map of Old Swan Bridge

The Old Swan Bridge, also known as Pulborough Bridge, is a stone bridge and Grade II listed building over the River Arun between Pulborough and Coldwaltham in West Sussex, south-eastern England.

== History and description ==
Before the construction of a bridge, a ferry was known to cross the Arun at Pulboorough. Documentary evidence suggests the ferry existed earlier than 1350. The ferry was replaced by a succession of timber bridges, the last of which was a short distance downstream from the site of the present bridge.

Swan Bridge was built in 1787 in a medieval style. It originally had three arches of ashlar construction. The fourth arch was added in 1834. The arches are all round-headed, supported by buttressed piers which rise from blunt cutwaters (starlings) and terminate below the parapet level. The parapets are in rounded, coped stone.

The bridge carried the main route from Horsham to Arundel (the A29 road) until it was bypassed by a single-arch bridge immediately upstream. It is a Grade II listed building and a scheduled monument.

== See also ==
- Stopham Bridge, just upstream
- Scheduled monuments in West Sussex
