= A29 road =

Road in Surrey

A29

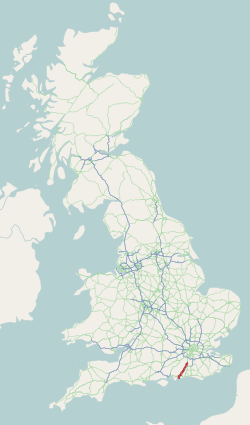

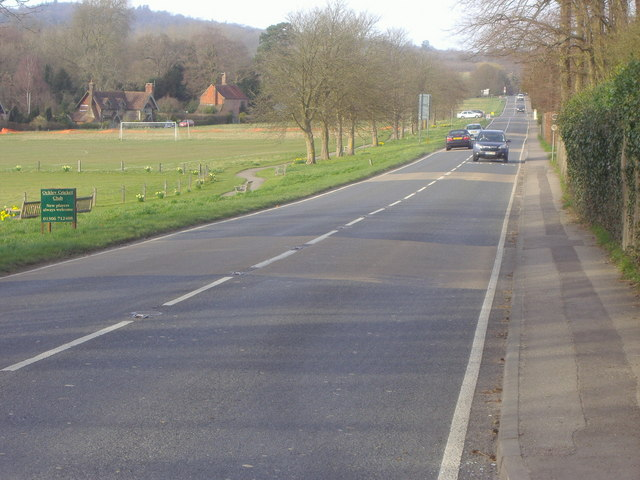
- The A29 at Stane Street, Ockley

Route information
- Length: 34.4 mi (55.4 km)

Major junctions
- North east end: A24 in Capel; 51.1728°N 0.3185°W
- A272 in Billingshurst A27 in Slindon A259 in Bersted
- South west end: B2259 / B2166 in Bognor Regis; 50.7927°N 0.6745°W

Location
- Country: United Kingdom
- Counties: Surrey, West Sussex
- Primary destinations: Billingshurst; Bognor Regis

Road network
- Roads in the United Kingdom; Motorways; A and B road zones
| ← A28 | → A30 |

The A29 is a main road in England in Surrey and chiefly in West Sussex that runs for 34.4 miles (55.4 km).

== Route ==
The road starts at the Beare Green roundabout with the A24 in Capel, south of Dorking. It passes minor villages, bypasses Billingshurst (where it crosses the A272) and crosses Pulborough not on its major axis. Here, it crossed the 18th-century Old Swan Bridge until a modern replacement was built. The A29 then crosses the South Downs at Bury Hill and passes Fontwell Park Racecourse before terminating on the B2259 in Bognor Regis.

For long-distance travel, the route is not a trunk road, as designated by National Highways and as such is of standard road width, often alongside hedges and open fields. Portsmouth and Guildford for example, 15 miles (24 km) and points along the route, are served by the four-to six-lane A3 trunk road.

From Capel to Hardham, south of Pulborough, the road with notable deviations follows the path of one of the multiple Roman roads with the name Stane Street, the Middle English and Old English for Stone Street due to the remaining building materials.

A narrow-gauge railway was built to construct the Dorking Bypass section.

== Junction list ==
| County | Location | mi | km | Destinations | Notes |
|---|---|---|---|---|---|
| Surrey | Capel | 0.0 | 0.0 | A24 – Worthing, Horsham, London, Dorking | North-eastern terminus |
| West Sussex | Slinfold | 7.4 | 11.9 | A281 south-east (Guildford Road) – Horsham, Broadbridge Heath | Information signed south-west only; north-eastern terminus of A29 concurrency |
| West Sussex | Slinfold | 8.2 | 13.2 | A281 north-west (Guildford Road) – Rudgwick, Guildford | South-western terminus of A281 concurrency |
| West Sussex | Five Oaks | 11.4 | 18.3 | A264 east (Horsham Road) – Horsham, Gatwick Airport | Gatwick signed north-east only; western terminus of A264 |
| West Sussex | Billingshurst | 12.7 | 20.4 | A272 east (Hilland Road) / High Street – Haywards Heath, Cowfold | North-eastern terminus of A272 concurrency |
| West Sussex | Billingshurst | 13.5 | 21.7 | A272 west (Newbridge Road) / West Street – Midhurst, Petworth, Wisborough Green, Billingshurst | South-western terminus of A272 concurrency |
| West Sussex | Pulborough | 18.8 | 30.3 | A283 (Lower Street / Station Road) – Village centre, Storrington, Petworth, West Chiltington, Fittleworth | Village centre and West Chiltington signed north-east only, Fittleworth south-west only; brief concurrency |
| West Sussex | Houghton | 25.0 | 40.2 | A284 south (London Road) / B2139 to A27 – Littlehampton, Arundel, Storrington, Amberley | To A27 and Littlehampton signed south-west only; northern terminus of A284 |
| West Sussex | Slindon | 28.9 | 46.5 | A27 east – Worthing, Brighton, Walberton, Yapton, Arundel | Walberton signed south-west only; north-eastern terminus of A27 concurrency |
| West Sussex | Walberton | 29.3 | 47.2 | A27 west / Arundel Road – Tangmere, Fontwell, Walberton, Chichester, Portsmouth | Chichester and Portsmouth signed north-east only; south-western terminus of A27 concurrency |
| West Sussex | Bersted | 33.2 | 53.4 | A259 east (Charles Purley Way) – Littlehampton, Middleton-on-Sea | North-eastern terminus of A259 concurrency |
| West Sussex | Bersted | 33.4 | 53.8 | A259 west (Rowan Way) / Steyning Way to A27 – Chichester, Portsmouth, Pagham | To A27, Portsmouth, and Pagham signed south-west only; south-western terminus of A259 concurrency |
| West Sussex | Bognor Regis | 34.4 | 55.4 | B2259 (Hotham Way) / B2166 (Chichester Road) / Victoria Drive – Town centre, Bersted, Pagham, Felpham, Aldwick | South-western terminus |
1.000 mi = 1.609 km; 1.000 km = 0.621 mi: Concurrency terminus
