= Twelve Mile 500 =

Lawn mower racing

Coordinates: 40°52′6″N 86°13′16″W

- First run: 4 July 1963

Characteristics
- Team members: 33 competitors
- Mixed-sex: yes
- Type: Outdoor track
- Equipment: Riding lawn mower
- Venue: Plank-Hill Park

The Twelve Mile 500 is a lawn mower race held in the small town of Twelve Mile, Indiana, organized by the Twelve Mile Lions Club and occurring annually on Independence Day.

== History ==
The tradition began in 1963, as a race for factory-built mowers, with their mowing decks removed. The first race took place at the former site of the Twelve Mile High School, with a traditional oval track. In 1969, the race was moved to its present location of Plank-Hill Park, and adopted a new "Grand Prix" style track. In 1996, the event was split into a two races, with one for four-cycle Briggs lawn mowers, and another for modified mowers. The race structure was changed again in 2010, with the addition of a super stock race, in addition to the Briggs and modified races.

== Rules ==
The Twelve Mile 500 is 15 mi (24 km) race, with 60 laps run on a one-quarter mile (0.40 km) track in the park, with a maximum of 33 entrants per race. Each participating team consists of a driver, a two-person pit crew, and a lap judge, and must meet a speed of approximately 30 mph (48 km/h) to qualify.

== Bibliography ==
- Costello, James (4 July 2006). "Drivers revving up for Twelve Mile 500". Logansport, Indiana: Pharos-Tribune.
- Wicker, Beau (4 July 2025). "Troyers dominate Twelve Mile 500". Logansport, Indiana: Pharos-Tribune.
- Ardoin, Jordan (29 November 2023). "The History of Lawn Mower Racing".
