= Stopham Bridge =

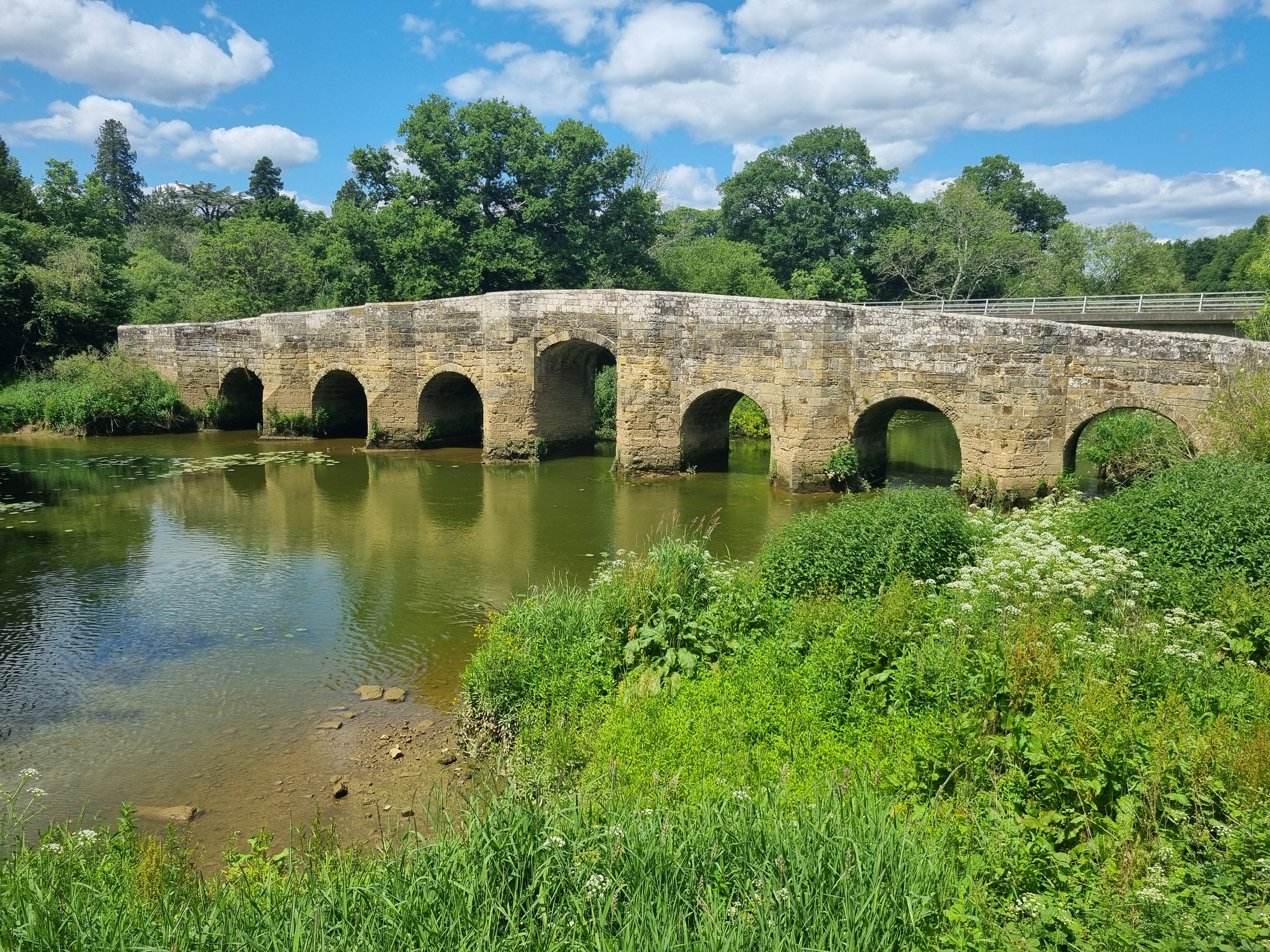
- Stopham Bridge from the south side
- Coordinates: 50°57′21″N 0°32′08″W
- Crosses: River Arun
- Locale: Stopham/Pulborough, West Sussex, England
- Heritage status: Grade I listed building, scheduled monument

Characteristics
- Material: Ironstone
- Total length: 246 ft (75 m)
- Width: 12 ft (3.7 m)
- No. of spans: 7

History
- Opened: 15th century

Stopham Bridge crosses the River Arun between Pulborough and Stopham in West Sussex, south-eastern England. It is a Grade I listed building and a scheduled monument.

== Background ==
Multi-arch bridges were rare in England until the 12th century. With technological improvements, stone—and later brick—began to proliferate, though many were later demolished or rebuilt. Historic England estimates that fewer than 200 medieval multi-arch bridges survive in England and considers all surviving, unaltered examples to be of national importance. Large medieval bridges are rare in Sussex compared to other parts of the United Kingdom, given that it lacks major rivers and communication routes. Several historic bridges were demolished as heavy industry grew, making Stopham a rare survivor.

The River Arun, though small compared to other English rivers, is one of the largest in Sussex. It formed an important trade route from the Middle Ages which was enhanced in the 19th century when it was linked to the River Wey by the Wey and Arun Canal, providing a route from London to the south coast. It is likely that the stone bridge was a replacement for an earlier timber crossing and a ford.

== Description ==
The bridge is at the uppermost navigable and tidal reaches of the Arun, just upstream from its confluence with the River Rother. It stands roughly 10 miles (16 kilometres) from the sea at Littlehampton as the crow flies and almost 20 miles (32 kilometres) along the course of the river. The bridge is medieval in origin though the exact date is unknown. Its design differs from neighbouring bridges over the Rother; no contemporary bridges over the Arun survive in their original state.

Stopham Bridge is built from locally quarried ironstone and sandstone. It has seven arches spanning the river with an eighth embedded in the causeway (added later for flood relief). Of the visible arches, all are round-headed except for the central one, crossing the main channel of the river, which is segmental. None of the arches are ribbed. The six flanking arches each have a span of 11 feet 9 inches (3.6 metres); the centre arch spans 12 feet 9 inches (3.9 metres). The centre arch is out of proportion to the others, having been raised by five feet (1.5 metres) in 1822. The bridge is 246 feet (75 metres) long (190 feet (58 metres) excluding abutments) and aligned roughly east to west but has a slight bend at the western (Stopham) end, probably to avoid the grounds of Stopham Manor. It has cutwaters (starlings) on both sides; those on the south side (facing downstream) form semi-hexagonal buttresses which terminate below the parapet. On the north side, buttresses rise to the full height of the parapet, forming nine recesses which were used as pedestrian refuges (the bridge is too narrow for separate footpaths). Stopham Bridge is unusually well-preserved structure and a good example of bridge-building from the era.

== History ==
The first documented crossing of the Arun at Stopham was a ferry known as the Eastover Ferry. There is conflicting documentary evidence on the date of construction of the current bridge, but a bridge in some form is known to have stood since at least the early 13th century. The earliest known record of a bridge is from 1347, when responsibility for its upkeep rested with the rapes (medieval administrative divisions of Sussex) of Chichester, Arundel, and Bramber. Patent rolls record a grant of pontage (authority to collect tolls to maintain the bridge) in 1399, though only for two years, suggesting a temporary structure. Thomas Walker Horsfield and James Dallaway—both 19th-century Sussex historians—along with other early authorities date the current bridge to 1309 but subsequent historians have suggested later dates. Edwin Jervoise, in his survey of historic bridges for the Society for the Protection of Ancient Buildings in the 1920s, suggested a 16th-century origin but believed the current structure was a replacement for a medieval one dating to 1347 and A. A. Evans, a Sussex historian writing in 1936, places it at 1423. Historic England postulates that the current structure was probably built from 1422 to 1423.

One arch was destroyed during the 17th-century English Civil War and replaced with a drawbridge, which was fenced off in 1650. The centre arch was raised in 1822 to allow larger boats to pass after the opening of the Wey and Arun Canal, which allowed onward connections north towards London. The date is inscribed on the arch. Repair work was undertaken in 1865 which included improvements to the approaches and the replacement of defective stonework with brickwork in several places, including the piers, cutwaters, and the soffits of the central arch.

The bridge carried the main route from Petworth and Fittleworth to Pulborough (the A283 road). It suffered damage from overloading by military convoys during the Second World War, exacerbated by heavy traffic later in the 20th century. Traffic lights were installed but it became increasingly common for vehicles to strike the bridge parapet at the curve. In 1986, a modern concrete bridge opened 100 feet (30 metres) to the north (upstream) of the medieval bridge and the A283 was diverted. The medieval bridge was restored in 1991, a fact recorded on a plaque, and now carries cyclists and pedestrians only. It has been a scheduled monument since February 1955. The bridge is maintained by West Sussex County Council.

== See also ==
- Old Swan Bridge, Pulborough, a short distance downstream
- Grade I listed buildings in West Sussex
- Scheduled monuments in West Sussex
