= Scheduled monuments in West Sussex =

List of scheduled monuments in the county of West Sussex, England

There are 912 scheduled monuments in the county of West Sussex, England. These protected sites date in some cases from the Neolithic period, and include medieval moated sites, ruined abbeys, castles, and Iron Age hillforts. In the United Kingdom, the scheduling of monuments was first initiated to ensure the preservation of "nationally important" archaeological sites and historic buildings. Protection is given to scheduled monuments under the Ancient Monuments and Archaeological Areas Act 1979.

== Notable scheduled monuments in West Sussex ==
This is a partial list of scheduled monuments in West Sussex.

Image	Name	Location	Date	Notes
	Chanctonbury Ring	50.89786°N 0.38167°W	Early Iron Age	Prehistoric hill fort on Chanctonbury Hill.
	Chichester Guildhall	50.839213°N 0.776607°W	1270–1280	The structure was originally built as a chancel by the Grey Friars of Chichester. William Blake was tried and found innocent of sedition in the guildhall in 1804.
	Cissbury Ring	50.86021°N 0.38335°W	Middle Iron Age	The largest hillfort in Sussex and the second largest in England.
	Devil's Humps, Stoughton	50°53′35″N 0°50′11″W	Bronze Age	Four Bronze Age barrows on the South Downs. Also known as the Kings' Graves, due to a legend that Viking Kings are buried here.
	Knepp Castle	50.97578°N 0.34482°W	12th century	Originally a fortified retreat, today only a single tower remains. its primary use originally was as a hunting lodge.
	Racton Monument	50.879454°N 0.897617°W	1766–1775	A folly, also known locally as the Racton Ruin. Some consider the site to be haunted.
	The Trundle	50°53′33″N 00°45′14″W	Iron Age	The monument includes a Neolithic causewayed enclosure, a large Iron Age hillfort, a 14th-century chapel, a post-medieval post mill destroyed by lightning in 1773 and the remains of a military encampment during World War II.
	Stopham Bridge		15th century	
	Old Swan Bridge, Pulborough		1787	

== See also ==
- Grade I listed buildings in West Sussex
- List of scheduled monuments in the United Kingdom
