= A264 road =

Road in West Sussex, England

Coordinates: 51.14446°N 0.06918°W

A264

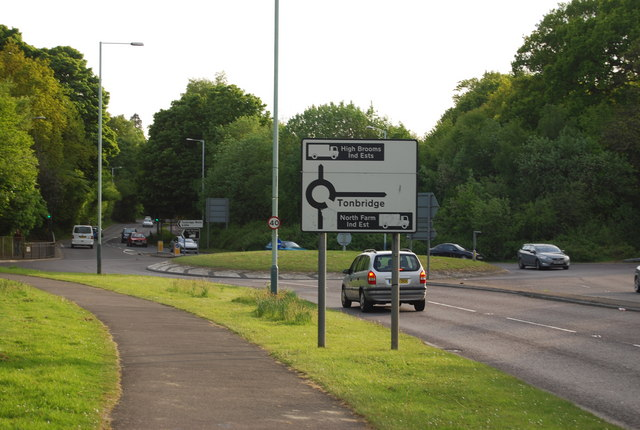

Major junctions
- East end: Pembury
- M23; A21; A22; A23; A24; A29 A267 A281 A228 A2011 A2220
- West end: Five Oaks

Location
- Country: United Kingdom
- Primary destinations: Horsham; Gatwick Airport; Crawley; East Grinstead; Royal Tunbridge Wells

Road network
- Roads in the United Kingdom; Motorways; A and B road zones

The A264 is an east–west road in southern England that runs from Pembury in west Kent to Five Oaks in West Sussex.

== History ==
There have been a number of notable changes in this important east–west route which follows the north Sussex border with Kent and Surrey.

Originally the route started in Tunbridge Wells, the Pembury to Tunbridge Wells section being originally the A263. West of Tunbridge Wells, instead of following its northerly route to East Grinstead via Holtye and Hammerwood, which was the B2110 prior to about 1970, it followed what is now the B2110 through Groombridge and Hartfield to Forest Row, and multiplexed with the A22 to East Grinstead (which explains the present discontinuity in the B2110 at Forest Row and East Grinstead, the unexpected sharp right at Langton Green when travelling west, and unexpected left at East Grinstead when travelling east along the A264). Both routes are winding and narrow and both have bridges with single file traffic.

West of East Grinstead, it multiplexes with the A22 to Felbridge. The section from the west of Felbridge as far as Three Bridges has been improved and partially rerouted.

For many years there was no junction with the M23, and the route went through both Crawley and Horsham.

In the late 1980s, it was rerouted along the newly constructed Copthorne Link Road to Junction 10 of the M23, and in the early 1990s was multiplexed south along the M23 to Junction 11 at Pease Pottage, and along the then newly constructed SW Crawley Bypass.

The section west of Crawley was upgraded to dual carriageway, and the route now follows Horsham's Northern Bypass (opened 1989; traffic previously went through the town) to its junction with the A24, then multiplexes south with the A24 (West Bypass), now also dual carriageway, to Broadbridge Heath where instead of going through the village it follows its bypass together with the A281.

The old route is followed southwest to Five Oaks and the A29. Thus, very little of the original A264 now carries that identifier.

== Route: major settlements and intersections ==
- Pembury (A21, A228)
- Tunbridge Wells (A26)
- East Grinstead (A22)
- Copthorne (M23)
- Crawley (A23, M23)
- Horsham (A24, A281)
- Broadbridge Heath (A281)
- Five Oaks (A29)
