= Bury, West Sussex =

Village and parish in West Sussex, England

Coordinates: 50.909°N 0.563°W

Bury
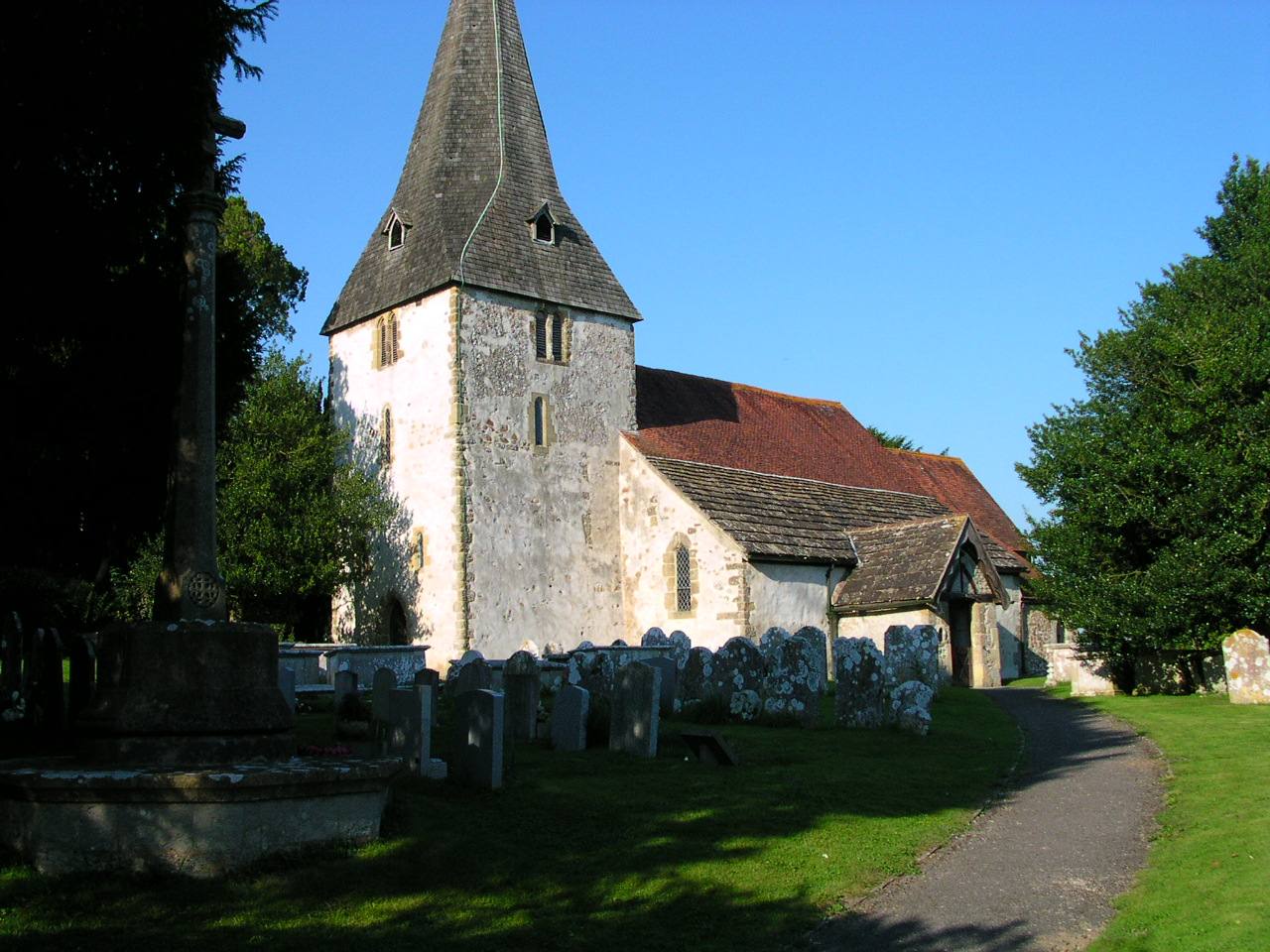
- St. John the Evangelist, Bury

- Location within West Sussex
- Area: 13.15 km^{2} (5.08 sq mi)
- Population: 642 (2011 Census)
  - Density: 53/km^{2} (140/sq mi)
- OS grid reference: TQ011131
  - London: 45 miles (72 km) NNE
- Civil parish: Bury
- District: Chichester
- Shire county: West Sussex
- Region: South East
- Country: England
- Sovereign state: United Kingdom
- Post town: PULBOROUGH
- Postcode district: RH20
- Dialling code: 01798
- Police: Sussex
- Fire: West Sussex
- Ambulance: South East Coast
- UK Parliament: Arundel and South Downs

Bury is a village and civil parish in the Chichester district of West Sussex, England. It is located on the A29 road, around 5 miles (8 km) south-west of Pulborough.

The villages of Bury and nearby West Burton are sited at the foot of the scarp slope of the South Downs, where springs from the chalk strata provided a constant supply of clean water. The Anglican parish church of St. John the Evangelist lies east of the village centre on the west bank of the River Arun. The church is dominated by a 12th-century tower with a cedar-shingled spire. There was formerly a passenger ferry by rowing boat to Amberley on the east bank.

There are many old houses in the village and a large modern village hall. There is one pub, the Squire and Horse, beside the A29 road. Bury House close to the pub was the home of author John Galsworthy for the final seven years of his life.

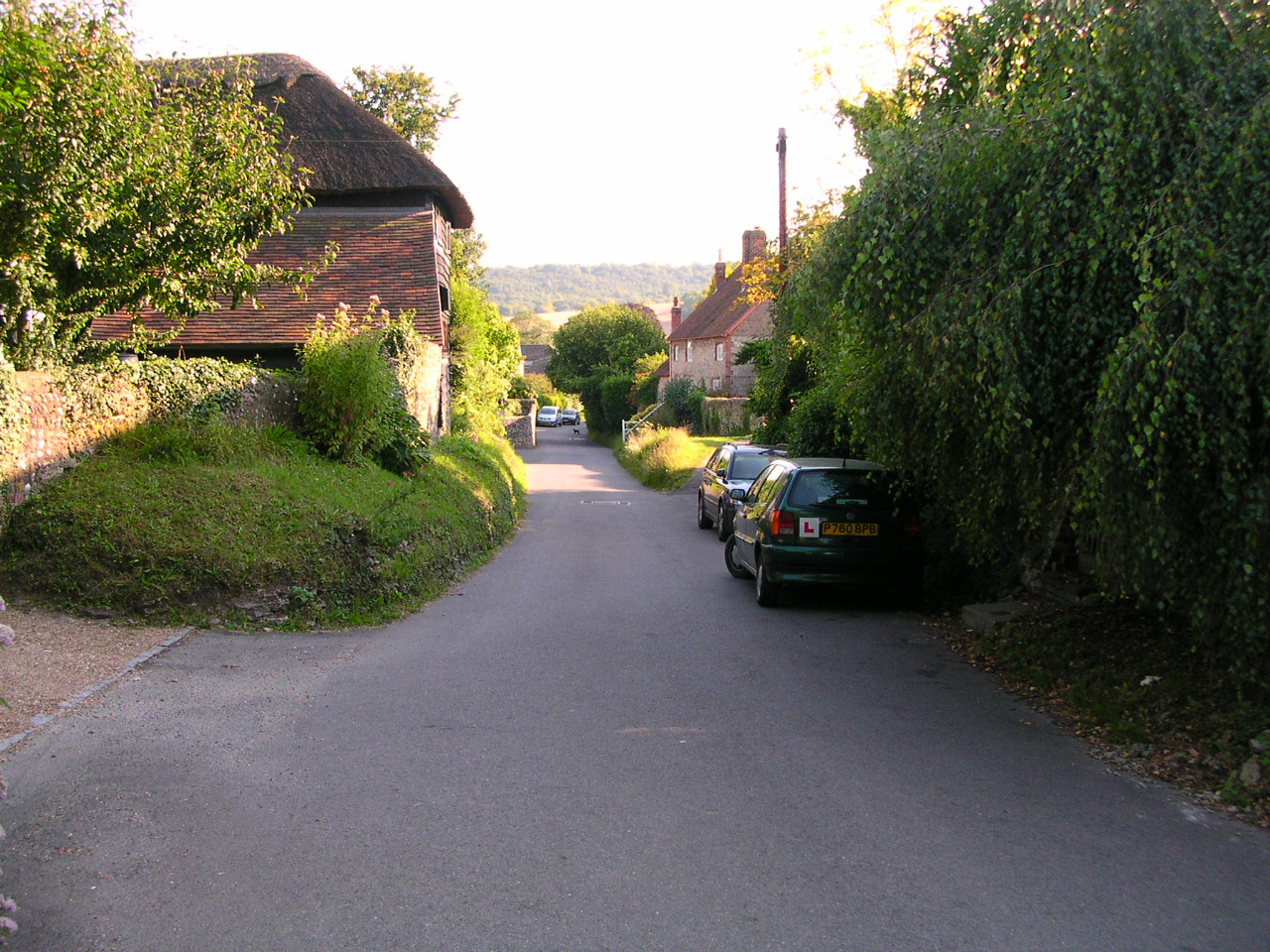
The Street, Bury.

West Burton, across some fields to the west, is smaller than Bury and has many interesting old houses. The village has a cricket club which plays its home matches at Bury Common.

The parish has a land area of 1315 hectares (3247 acres). In the 2001 census 691 people lived in 264 households, of whom 319 were economically active. The 2011 Census recorded a population of 642.

== Governance ==
An electoral ward of the same name exists. This ward stretches North West to Graffham with a population taken at the 2011 census of 2,201.
