= Twelve Mile, Indiana =

Twelve Mile
- Unincorporated town and Census-designated place
- Cass County's location in Indiana

- Location in Cass County
- Coordinates: 40°51′56″N 86°13′13″W
- Country: United States
- State: Indiana
- County: Cass
- Township: Adams
- Elevation: 804 ft (245 m)
- ZIP code: 46988
- FIPS code: 18-76886
- GNIS feature ID: 2830330

Twelve Mile is an unincorporated town in Adams Township, Cass County, Indiana. Its name is sometimes said to come from its location that is approximately 12 miles (19 km) from the cities of Logansport, Peru and Rochester, but this is an old wives' tale. The town was located on the twelve-mile marker of the railroad that the town grew around. The eastern portion of the town was formerly known as Hen Peck; but as the two small towns grew they became one town that was referred to as Twelve Mile.

== Festivals ==
The Twelve Mile Christmas Pageant has been held every December since 1970 in Plank-Hill Park. The pageant was started by Clifton Skinner, an employee at Bunker Hill Air Force Base (now Grissom Air Reserve Base), who based part of the pageant on a tradition among the base's airmen of placing Christmas-themed panels in front of their barracks.

Twelve Mile is home to the Twelve Mile 500, a riding lawnmower race held annually on Independence Day and begun in 1963.

== Demographics ==
Historical population
Census	Pop.	Note	%±
2023 (est.)	355

The United States Census Bureau defined Twelve Mile as a census designated place in the 2022 American Community Survey.
