= Five Oaks =

Village in West Sussex, England

Coordinates: 51.04479°N 0.43522°W

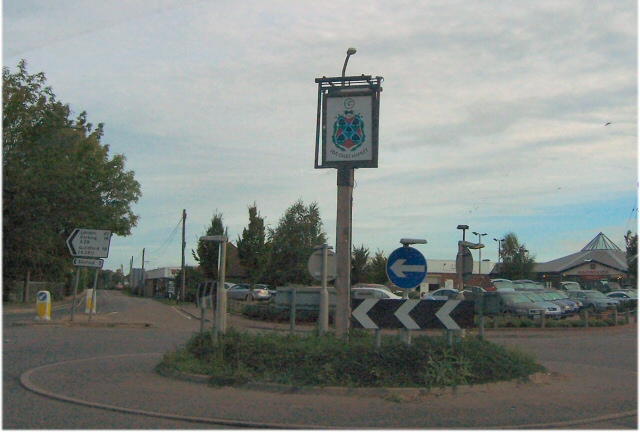

- Location within West Sussex
- OS grid reference: TQ097284
- Civil parish: Billingshurst
- District: Horsham
- Shire county: West Sussex
- Region: South East
- Country: England
- Sovereign state: United Kingdom
- Post town: BILLINGSHURST
- Postcode district: RH14
- Dialling code: 01403
- Police: Sussex
- Fire: West Sussex
- Ambulance: South East Coast
- UK Parliament: Horsham

Five Oaks is a large hamlet in the Horsham District of West Sussex, England. It lies about 1.7 miles (2.8 km) north of Billingshurst on the Roman road of Stane Street (now the A29) at the junction with the Western end of the A264.
