= West Burton, West Sussex =

Village in West Sussex, England

Coordinates: 50.9169°N 0.57875°W

West Burton
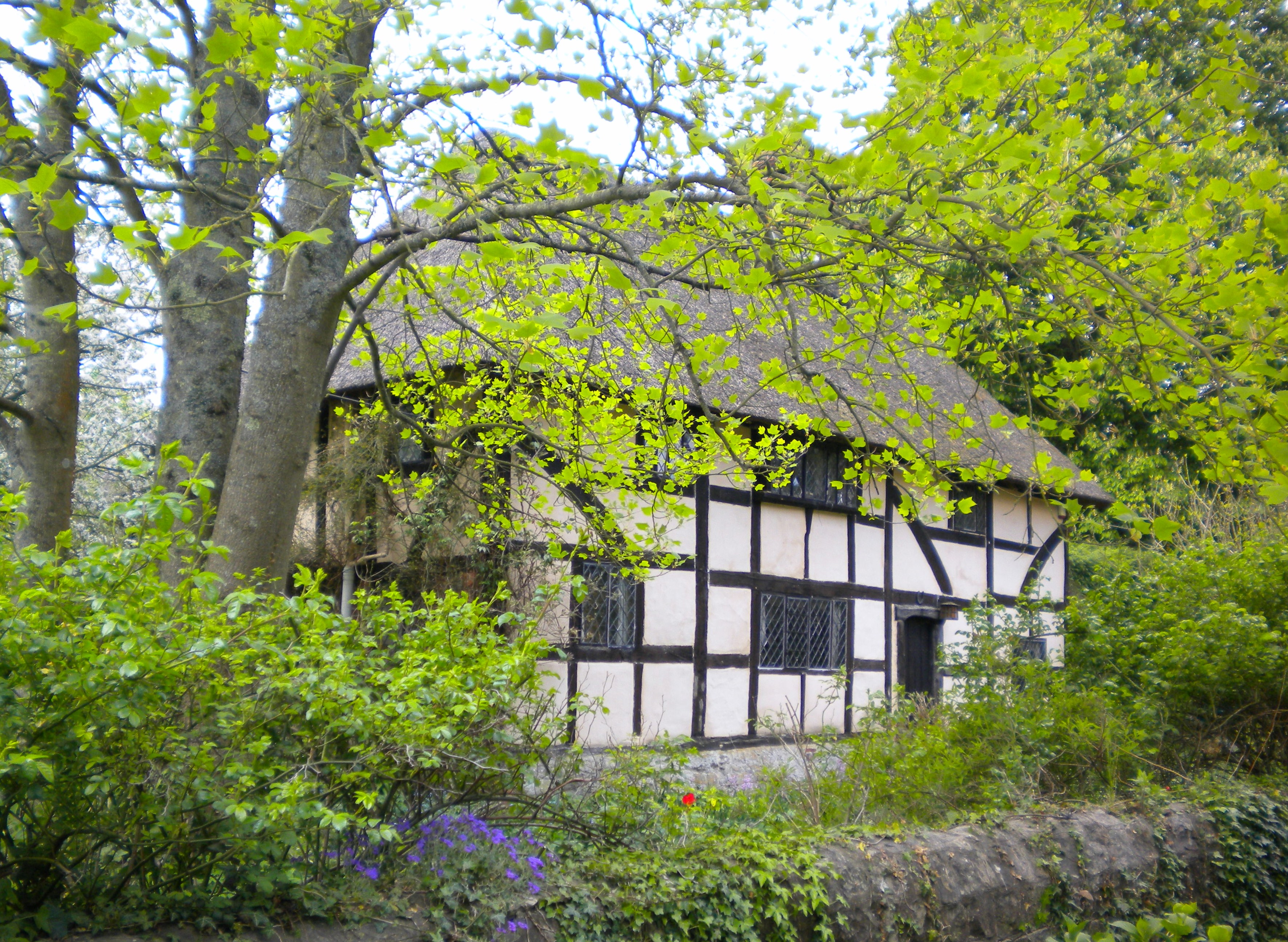
- A timber framed medieval house in West Burton

- Location within West Sussex
- OS grid reference: TQ000140
- Civil parish: Bury
- District: Chichester
- Shire county: West Sussex
- Region: South East
- Country: England
- Sovereign state: United Kingdom
- Post town: Pulborough
- Postcode district: RH20 1
- Police: Sussex
- Fire: West Sussex
- Ambulance: South East Coast
- UK Parliament: Arundel and South Downs

West Burton is a small hamlet in the Parish of Bury and the Chichester district of West Sussex, England. It lies between Bignor and Bury on the Lower Greensand ridge, 4.5 miles (7.2 km) southwest of Pulborough. It is one of a string of Saxon settlements at the foot of the South Downs escarpment where springs from the chalk strata provided clean reliable water supply.

Notable buildings in West Burton include West Burton House a grade II listed house, named Lillywhites, where Frances Dakyns, the English manager of Adolf and Fritz Busch lived, and Cooke's House a historic park and garden which was the residence of artist Jeanne Courtauld.

== Notable people ==
- Violet Milner, socialite
- Jeanne Courtauld, artist
- Mabel Constanduros, actress
