= Don Manley =

British crossword compiler (born 1945)

Don Manley (born 2 June 1945) is a long-serving setter of crosswords in the UK. He has supplied puzzles for the Radio Times, The Spectator, Today, The Independent, The Times, The Daily Telegraph, The Guardian, and the Financial Times and the Sunday Times among others. He is crossword editor of Church Times.

He writes under the pseudonyms Duck, Pasquale, Quixote, Bradman, Giovanni, and Izetti (all punningly connected with the name Don or Donald). He has also written a book on devising and solving crosswords, Chambers Crossword Manual (1986, 5th edition October 2014).

He has appeared on the BBC Radio 4 panel game, Puzzle Panel, and anchored the BBC4 documentary "How to Solve a Cryptic Crossword".

Don Manley was brought up in Cullompton, Devon, attending local state schools and Blundell's School, Tiverton as a Foundation Scholar. He read physics at Bristol University. After a short spell in a telecommunications laboratory, he worked in academic and educational publishing at The Institute of Physics, Stanley Thornes, Basil Blackwell, and Oxford University Press, which he left in 2002 when crosswords took over as his sole paid occupation.
