= Wisborough Green =

Village and parish in West Sussex, England

Coordinates: 51.023°N 0.505°W

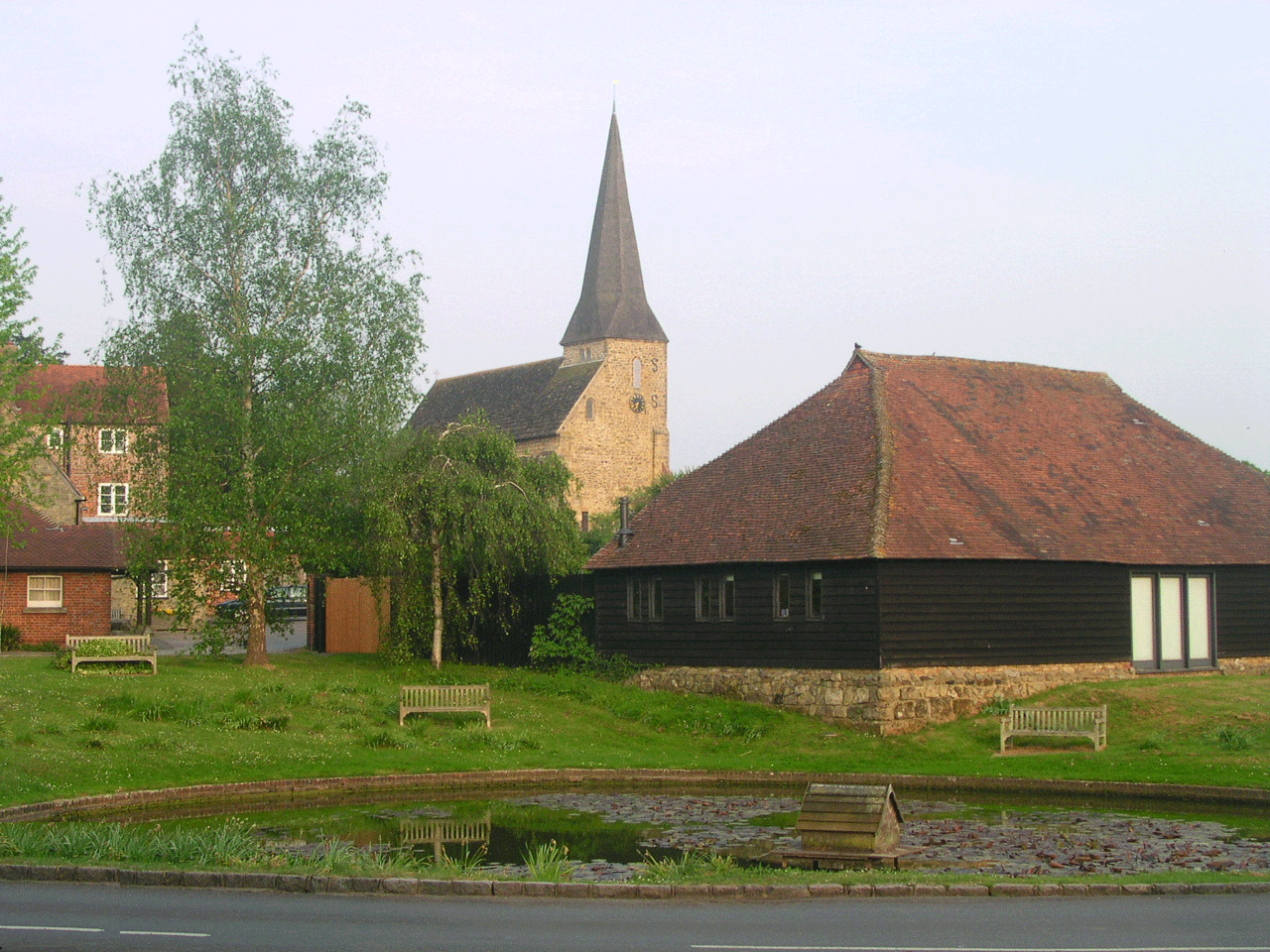
- Parish church of St. Peter ad Vincula and pond

- Location within West Sussex
- Area: 17.57 km^{2} (6.78 sq mi)
- Population: 1,414 (2011, including Bedham)
  - Density: 77/km^{2} (200/sq mi)
- OS grid reference: TQ049259
  - London: 37 miles (60 km) NNE
- Civil parish: Wisborough Green
- District: Chichester
- Shire county: West Sussex
- Region: South East
- Country: England
- Sovereign state: United Kingdom
- Post town: BILLINGSHURST
- Postcode district: RH14
- Dialling code: 01403
- Police: Sussex
- Fire: West Sussex
- Ambulance: South East Coast
- UK Parliament: Horsham
- Website: Wisborough Green

Wisborough Green is a village and civil parish in West Sussex, England, 2 miles (3.2 km) west of Billingshurst on the A272 road.

Newbridge, where the A272 crosses the River Arun 8 miles (13 km) east of the village, was the highest point of the Arun Navigation, and the southern end of the Wey and Arun Canal. Newbridge Wharf(e), beneath the bridge, was an important part of the local transport system in the nineteenth century, before which, in the parish much further south, Pallingham Quay or Wharf was the limit of most navigation.

== Governance ==
Wisborough Green has its own parish council, with nine councillors.

Following a boundary review in 2019, the electoral ward of Wisborough Green was abolished. The village is now represented within the electoral ward of Loxwood, which elects two people to the Chichester District Council.

Wisborough Green elects a representative to West Sussex County Council. Its member of Parliament is Andrew Griffith who sits for the constituency of Arundel and South Downs.

== Features ==
Wisborough Green supports a village shop, which incorporates a post office. There is a twice-weekly bus service to nearby Billingshurst.

Around the large village green, used for playing cricket and football, are two pubs, the Cricketers Arms and the Three Crowns, and a village shop. Nearby hamlets include Burdocks, Strood Green, and Newpound, which has a third pub, The Bat & Ball, near Fishers Farm, a farm adventure park.

Wisborough Green School was founded in the late 19th century, with a purpose-built schoolhouse neighbouring the church. That building is no longer used by the school, which completed a new structure in 1997, and significant extensions in 2014, reflecting the growing population.

Meeting places include Wisborough Village Hall, next to the pond, a Scout hut down a country lane, and the cricket pavilion on the green, which doubles as a social club.

== Statistics ==
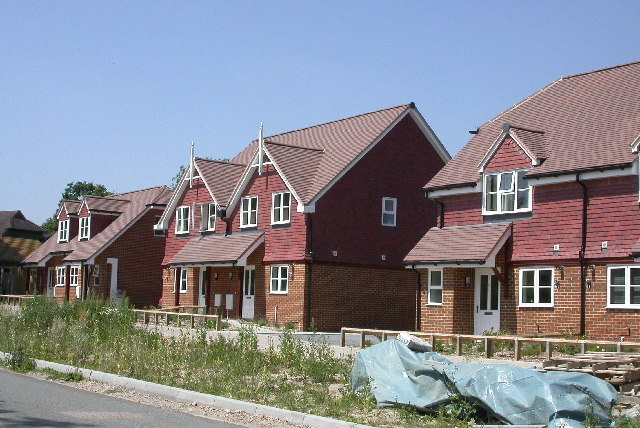
New houses in Wisborough Green, in 2005

The parish covers a rather large 1756.9 hectares (4339.5 acres). The 2001 census recorded a population of 1,360 people (667 male and 693 female) living in 570 households, with an average of 2.93 people per house. Of 964 people aged 16–74, 621 were economically active. The ward boundaries at the time of the 2011 Census encompassed a population of 2,477.

== Places of worship ==
The Church of England parish church of St. Peter ad Vincula (St Peter in Chains or the Liberation of Peter) is on high ground near a small pond with pollarded willow trees. Its dedication, one of a couple of dozen in Britain, is for the saint and Basilica of San Pietro in Vincoli in Rome. The vicar is the Reverend Clive Jenkins.

An independent evangelical church meets in the Zoar Chapel. The building was constructed in 1753 for the Strict Baptist denomination; other churches of that name exist elsewhere in Sussex (e.g. Zoar Strict Baptist Chapel) and further afield.

== Notable residents ==
The actor and actress, husband and wife James Bolam and Susan Jameson, live in the village. Pink Floyd guitarist David Gilmour and his wife, novelist Polly Samson, live on a farm just outside the village.
