= Pulborough =

Village in West Sussex, England

Coordinates: 50.96°N 0.51°W

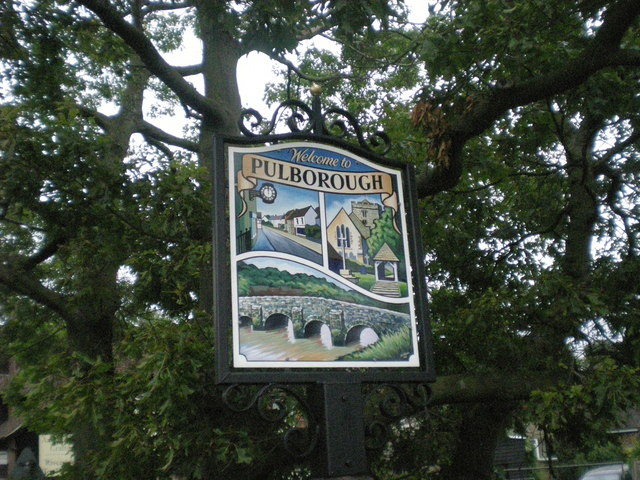
- Welcome sign

- Location within West Sussex
- Area: 20.98 km^{2} (8.10 sq mi)
- Population: 4,685 2001 Census; 5,206 (Census 2011)
  - Density: 223/km^{2} (580/sq mi)
- OS grid reference: TQ047187
  - London: 41 miles (66 km) NNE
- Civil parish: Pulborough
- District: Horsham
- Shire county: West Sussex
- Region: South East
- Country: England
- Sovereign state: United Kingdom
- Post town: PULBOROUGH
- Postcode district: RH20
- Dialling code: 01798
- Police: Sussex
- Fire: West Sussex
- Ambulance: South East Coast
- UK Parliament: Arundel and South Downs
- Website: Parish Council

Pulborough is a village and civil parish in the Horsham district of West Sussex, England, with some 5,000 inhabitants. It is located almost centrally within West Sussex and is 42 miles (68 km) south west of London. It is at the junction of the north–south A29 and the east–west A283 roads.

The village is near the confluence of the River Arun and the River Rother, on the Stane Street Roman road from London to Chichester. It looks southwards over the broad flood plain of the tidal Arun to a backdrop of the South Downs. It is on the northern boundary of the newly established (2010) South Downs National Park.

The parish covers an area of 5,183 acres (2,098 hectares). In the 2001 census there were 4,685 people living in 1,976 households within the parish, of whom 2,333 were economically active. At the 2011 census, the population of Bignor was included, and the total population of the parish was 5,206.

== History ==
Historically, it was a fording place over the River Arun used by the Romans, who had a mansio across the river at Hardham, one day's march from Chichester on the London road. The Saxons bridged the River Arun here and at nearby Stopham Bridge, north of its confluence with the River Rother. It became an important watering and overnight halt for cattle drovers providing easy access to water.

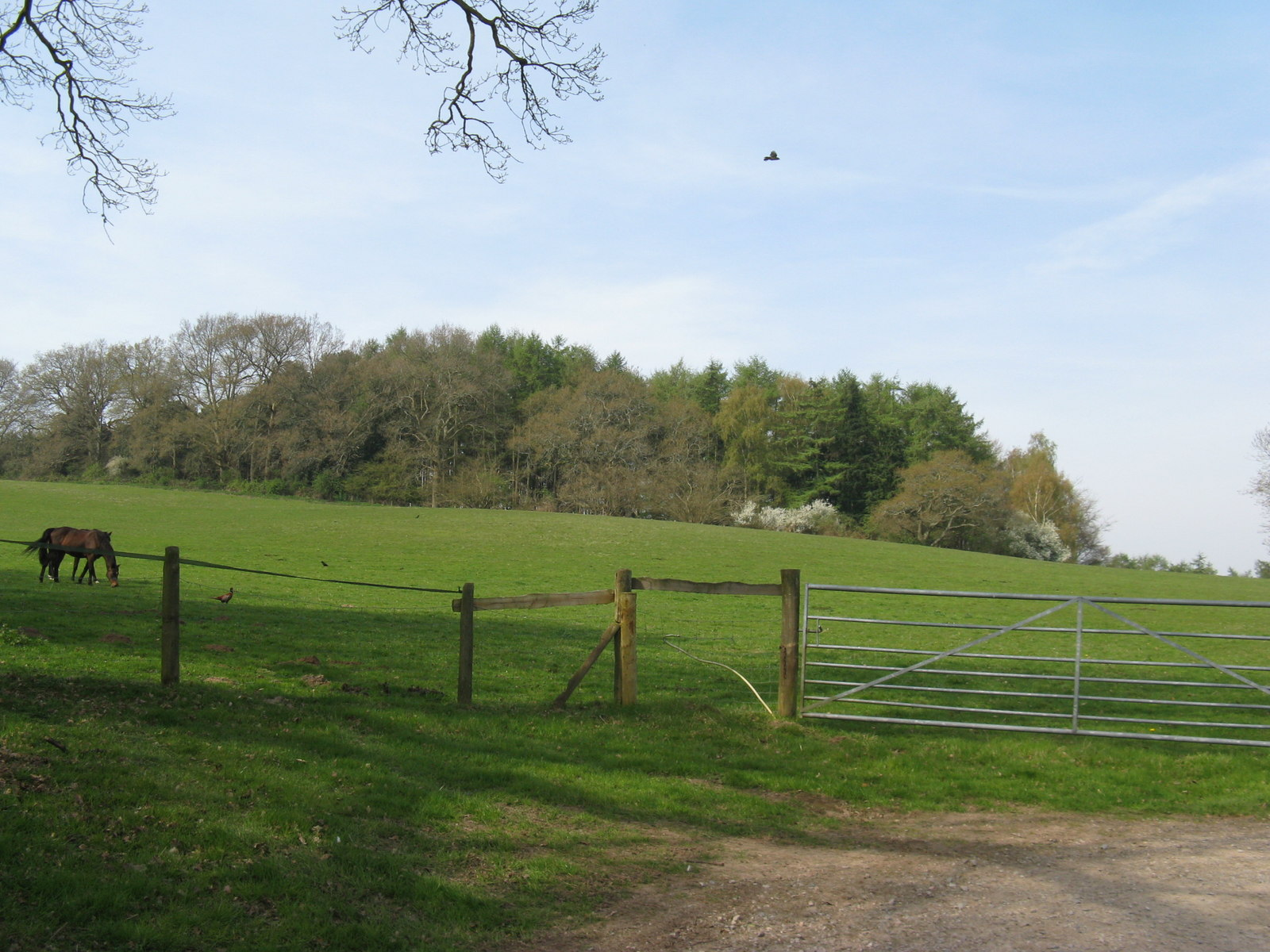
Park Mound

A mile to the west in woodland are the earthwork remains of a motte and bailey castle known as Park Mound, dating from the 11th century. The Domesday Book of 1086 lists Poleberge in the hundred of West Easwrith, one of the five hundreds in the Rape of Arundel in the Land of Earl Roger.

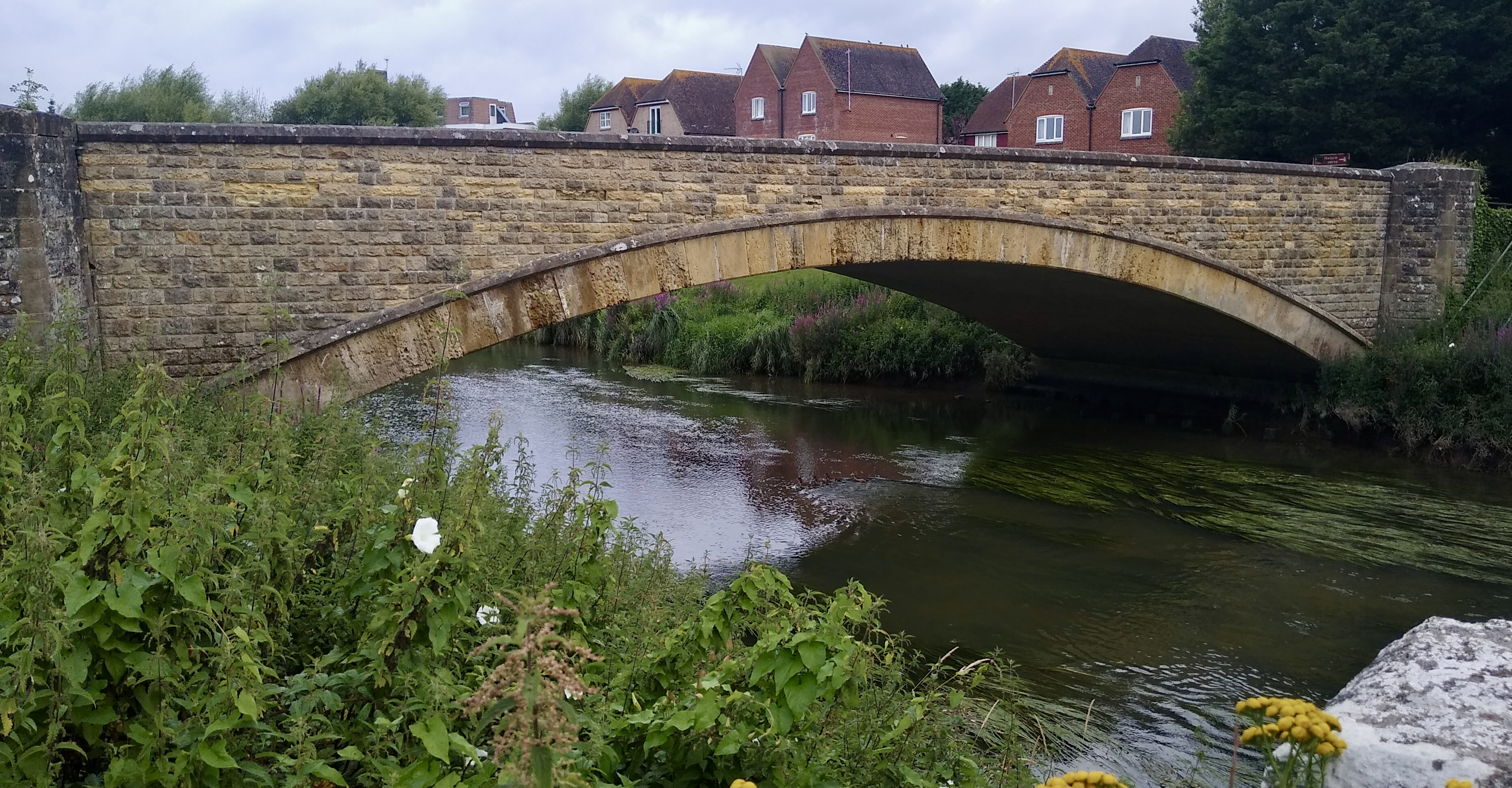
Swan Bridge at Pulborough (A29)

Transport connections afforded by the River Arun, its navigation, and later by the LBSCR Arun Valley Line brought Pulborough into the industrial age. Good road connections permitted, in the 20th century, the development of manufacturing industry, notably heavy engineering in London Road. This has long since closed down and the site now supports, among other things, a supermarket and a health centre. The village is served by Pulborough railway station.

In 2019, two fragments of a decorated buffer terminal torc were found in 2019 'near Pulborough' which have been dated to 4th to 3rd century BCE. After its discovery and reporting to the Portable Antiquities Scheme, the torc was acquired for the Barbican House Museum.

== Attractions ==
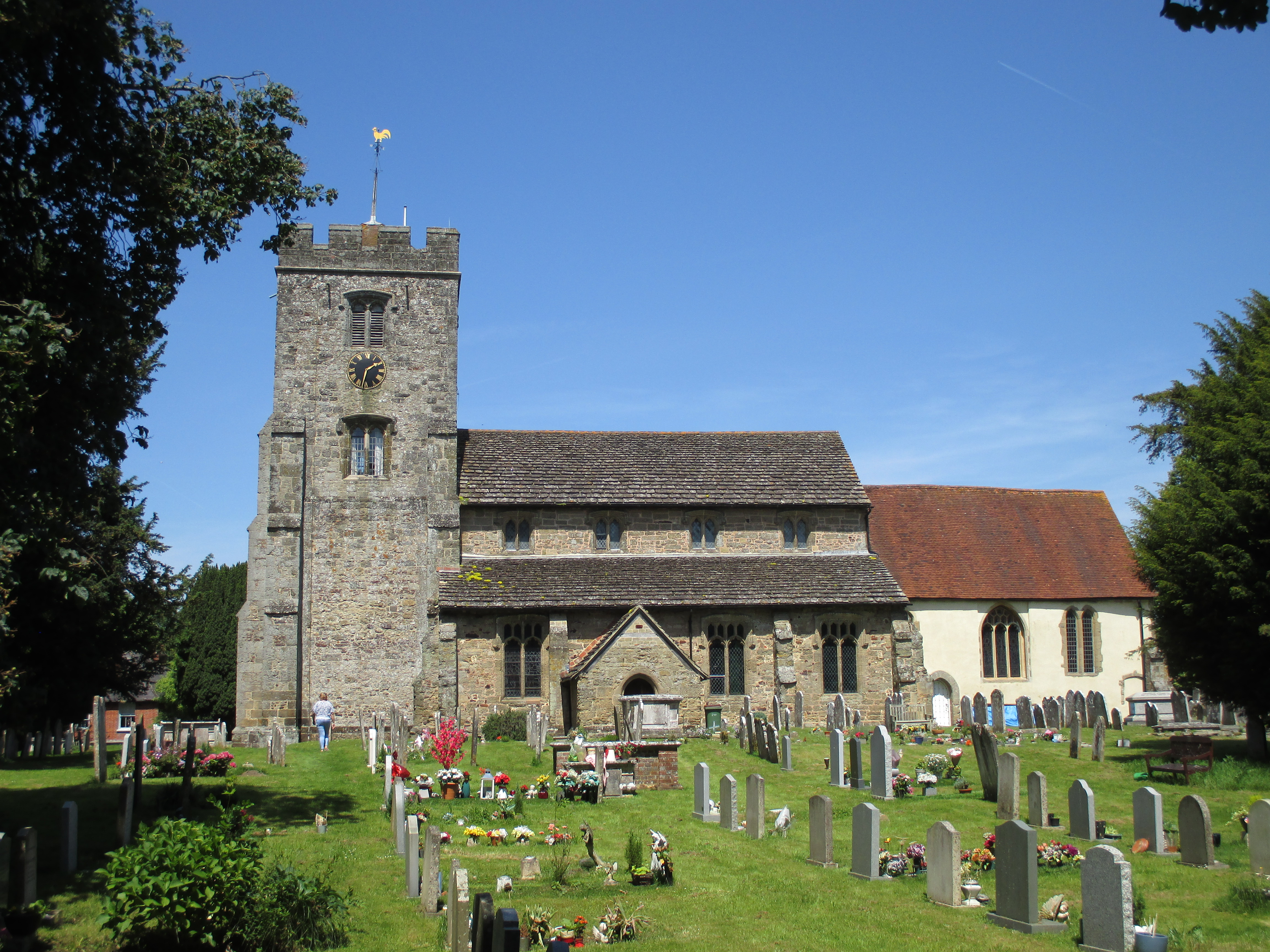
St Mary's Church

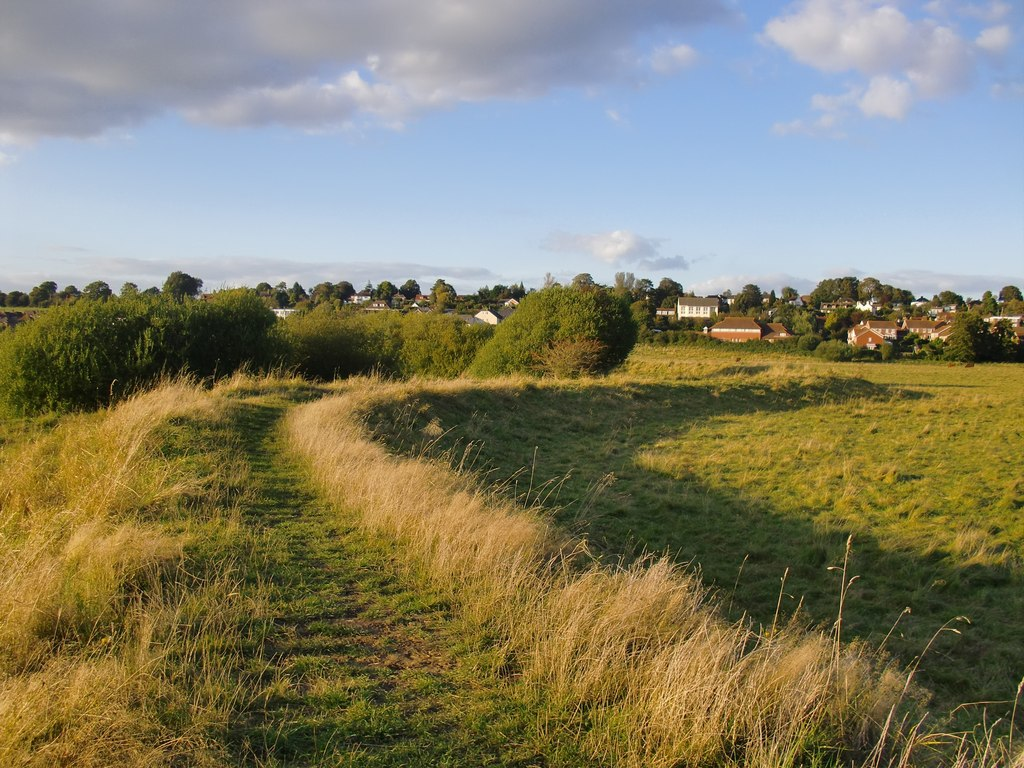
View towards Pulborough

Pulborough's twelfth-century parish church, St. Mary's Church, is dedicated to the Virgin Mary.

There is a wild art trail, that leads from the railway station across the Pulborough Brooks to the RSPB reserve at Wiggonholt. Pulborough is also home to the South Downs Light Railway, whose steam and diesel trains run regularly throughout the summer and offer a more limited service during the colder months.

On the fourth Saturday of September Pulborough hosts a traditional Harvest Fair complete with old time fair ground, welly wanging and a scarecrow competition, and in June the Pulborough duck race society holds its annual duck race, a charity event.

== Local cricket ==
Earliest records suggest cricket has been played in Pulborough since 1799. Now based at the Recreation Ground, Pulborough Cricket Club has numerous Senior and Junior (Colts) teams. Previously a member club of the Sussex Invitation League, Pulborough's 1st and 2nd Elevens were invited to join the Sussex Cricket League ("the county league") from the 2004 season. A 3rd League XI plays in the West Sussex League, home matches being played nearby at Watersfield. Pulborough was a founder member of the North West Sussex Colts Cricket League (now known as the iDentilam League) in 1987.

Various age-groups (Under 9s, 10s, 12s, 14s and 16s) now provide an opportunity to develop cricket skills, played in a competitive environment and ultimately secure the long-term future of the club. The club also provides a mechanism for younger players to progress into senior cricket, with two non-league senior teams playing matches on Sunday afternoons. In 2006, the Sussex Cricket Board recognised the club's efforts towards youth sport, and awarded it ECB 'Focus Club' status. In 2008, the club launched a junior girls team.

== Other events ==
On 17 July 2000, the body of missing girl Sarah Payne was found in a field off the A29 near the village. She had been reported missing some 15 miles (24 km) away near Littlehampton 16 days earlier. Roy Whiting, a 42-year-old convicted paedophile, was found guilty of her murder on 12 December 2001 and sentenced to life imprisonment.

In 2022, a self-built house built on a plot of land at the edge of the village featured on the television programme Grand Designs.

== Climate ==
Climate data for North Heath (1991–2020)
Month	Jan	Feb	Mar	Apr	May	Jun	Jul	Aug	Sep	Oct	Nov	Dec	Year
Mean daily maximum °C (°F)	8.5 (47.3)	9.0 (48.2)	11.7 (53.1)	14.8 (58.6)	17.6 (63.7)	20.6 (69.1)	23.3 (73.9)	22.9 (73.2)	19.9 (67.8)	15.8 (60.4)	11.8 (53.2)	9.2 (48.6)	15.5 (59.9)
Mean daily minimum °C (°F)	2.5 (36.5)	2.2 (36.0)	3.4 (38.1)	4.6 (40.3)	6.9 (44.4)	9.6 (49.3)	11.7 (53.1)	11.5 (52.7)	9.4 (48.9)	7.0 (44.6)	4.4 (39.9)	2.6 (36.7)	6.3 (43.3)
Average rainfall mm (inches)	92.3 (3.63)	63.4 (2.50)	52.5 (2.07)	52.5 (2.07)	46.8 (1.84)	55.9 (2.20)	63.2 (2.49)	63.6 (2.50)	63.3 (2.49)	103.3 (4.07)	103.1 (4.06)	98.2 (3.87)	858.7 (33.81)
Mean monthly sunshine hours	55.2	83.0	117.8	170.1	205.0	199.6	215.9	196.6	148.1	109.2	66.2	54.0	1,621.2
Source: Met Office

== Notable people ==
- Artists Clara Christian (1868–1906) and Ethel Walker (1861–1951) lived in a cottage on Toat Lane, two miles north of Pulborough, during the mid-1890s.
- Psychic researcher Harry Price (1881–1948) lived at Pulborough from before his marriage in 1908 until his death.
- Charles Frend (1909 - 1977), film director and screenwriter, was born in Pulborough.

== Listed buildings ==
Listed buildings in the parish
Name	Listing	Note
Ancaster House	Grade II listed	
Chequers Hotel	Grade II listed	
Old Place	Grade II* listed	
Old Place Manor	Grade II listed	
Old Swan Bridge	Grade II listed	Also known as Pulborough Bridge
St Mary's Church	Grade I listed	
Pulborough Signal Box	Grade II listed	
Stopham Bridge	Grade I listed	Spans the Arun between Pulborough and Stopham
