= Old Place, Pulborough =

Listed building in West Sussex, England

Old Place
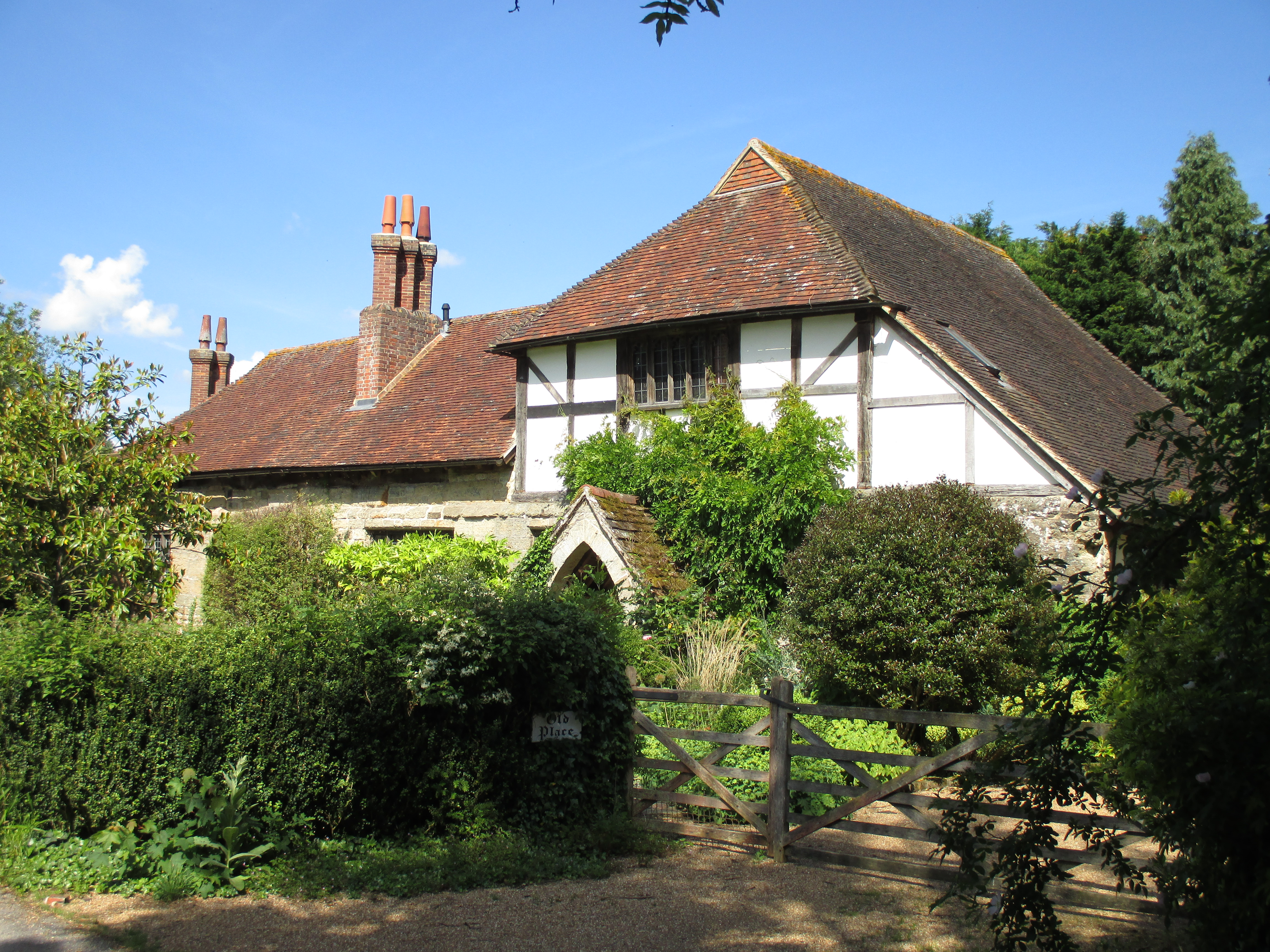

- Location within West Sussex

General information
- Location: Coombelands Lane, Pulborough, West Sussex, England
- Coordinates: 50.9606°N 0.513095°W

Listed Building – Grade II*
- Official name: Old Place
- Designated: 15 March 1955
- Reference no.: 1286130

Old Place is a Grade II* listed building in Pulborough, West Sussex, England.

This building was originally part of Old Place Manor, though the exact role is unclear.

== See also ==
- Grade II* listed buildings in West Sussex
