= Harry Price =

English psychic researcher (1881–1948)

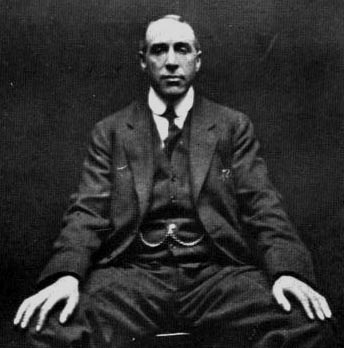
- Photograph of Harry Price, taken by paranormal hoaxer William Hope in 1922
- Born: 17 January 1881; London, England
- Died: 29 March 1948 (aged 67); Pulborough, West Sussex, England
- Occupation: Psychic researcher
- Organizations: Magic Circle; National Laboratory of Psychical Research; American Society for Psychical Research; University of London Council for Psychical Investigation; The Ghost Club

Harry Price (17 January 1881 – 29 March 1948) was a British psychic researcher and author, who gained public prominence for his investigations into psychical phenomena and exposing fraudulent spiritualist mediums. He is best known for his well-publicised investigation of the purportedly haunted Borley Rectory in Essex, England.

== Early life ==
Although Price claimed his birth was in Shropshire he was actually born in London in Red Lion Square on the site of the South Place Ethical Society's Conway Hall. He was the only son and second child of Edward Ditcher Price (1834–1906), then traveller (salesman) for the paper manufacturing firm of Edward Saunders and Son, and his wife Emma Randall nee Meech (1860–1902). His father being born at Rodington in Shropshire, Price spent much time in the county in holidays with relatives. He was educated in New Cross, first at Waller Road Infants School and then Haberdashers' Aske's Hatcham Boys' School. He completed his education at Goldsmiths College, studying chemistry and photography, as well as electrical and mechanical engineering. In Who's Who, he claimed to have been educated in Shropshire as well as London but did not name his schools.

At 15, Price founded the Carlton Dramatic Society and wrote plays, including a drama, about his early experience with a poltergeist which he said took place at a haunted unnamed manor house in Shropshire.

According to Richard Morris, in his biography Harry Price: The Psychic Detective (2006), Price came to the attention of the press when he claimed an early interest in space-telegraphy. He set up a receiver and transmitter between Telegraph Hill, Lewisham and St Peter's Church Brockley and captured a spark on a photographic plate. This, though, was nothing more than Price writing a press release saying he had performed the experiment, as nothing was verified.

The young Price also had an avid interest in coin collecting and wrote several articles for The Askean, the magazine for Haberdashers' School. In his autobiography, Search for Truth, written between 1941 and 1942, Price claimed he was involved with archaeological excavations in Greenwich Park, London, but, in earlier writings on Greenwich, he denied any such involvement. He also claimed to have uncovered Roman coins while earlier excavating at the site of Uriconium in Wroxeter, Shropshire. From 1902 to 1904 he serialised an article on "Shropshire Tokens and Mints" in the Wellington Journal and Shrewsbury News, at age 21 published his first book, on The Coins of Kent, and served as honorary curator of numismatics at Ripon Museum, North Yorkshire, in 1904.

From around May 1908 Price continued his interest in archaeology at Pulborough, Sussex, where he had moved prior to marrying Constance Mary Knight, only daughter of Robert Hastings Knight, on 1 August that year. As well as working as a salesman for paper merchants Edward Saunders & Sons, he wrote for two local Sussex newspapers: the West Sussex Gazette and the Southern Weekly News in which he related his remarkable propensity for discovering 'clean' antiquities. One of these, a 'silver' ingot (discovered by Richard Morris to be housed in Price's collection of artefacts at Senate House, University of London and made of base materials) was stamped around the time of the last Roman emperor Honorius. A few years later, another celebrated Sussex archaeologist, Charles Dawson, found a brick at Pevensey Fort in Sussex, which was purportedly made in Honorius' time. In 1910 Professor Francis J. Haverfield of Oxford University, the country's foremost expert on Roman history and a Fellow of the Royal Academy, declared the ingot to be a fake. A report for the Proceedings of the Society of Antiquaries (number 23, pages 121–9) in the same year reported that:

'... the double axe type of silver ingot was well known and dated from late Imperial times but the one recovered from Sussex was an inferior copy of one found at the Tower of London, with alterations to give it an air of authenticity. Both the shape and lettering betrayed its origin.'

Through his father, who died in 1906, he inherited a share in the paper firm which gave him more independent means to support his interests. At the start of the First World War he attempted to enlist for service but was medically rejected because of heart strain though he offered the Royal Flying Corps assistance with colour filters for aerial photography. At his Pulborough home he set up a workshop for making shell-fuses and in 1918 worked as night shift foreman at a munitions works in Tottenham.

== Interest in magic and conjuring ==
In his autobiography, Search for Truth, Price said encountering the "Great Sequah" in Shrewsbury was "entirely responsible for shaping much of my life's work", and led to him acquiring the first volume of what would become the Harry Price Library. He met the purportedly Native American magician who appeared with a circus troupe in 1889 when Price, then aged eight, was reportedly cured of a toothache. Price later became an expert amateur conjurer, joined the Magic Circle in 1922 and maintained a lifelong interest in stage magic and conjuring. His expertise in sleight-of-hand and magic tricks stood him in good stead for what would become his all consuming passion, the investigation of paranormal phenomena.

The psychical researcher Eric Dingwall and Price re-published an anonymous work written by a former medium entitled Revelations of a Spirit Medium (1922) which exposed the tricks of mediumship and the fraudulent methods of producing "spirit hands". Originally all the copies of the book were bought up by spiritualists and deliberately destroyed.

== Psychical research ==
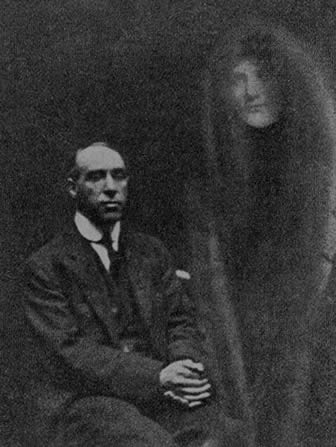
A photograph by William Hope showing Price with a "spirit"

Price joined the Society for Psychical Research (SPR) in 1920. He used his knowledge of conjuring to debunk fraudulent mediums, but unlike other magicians, Price endorsed some mediums that he believed were genuine. Price's first major success in psychical research came in 1922 when he exposed the 'spirit' photographer William Hope. In the same year he travelled to Germany together with Eric Dingwall and investigated Willi Schneider at the home of Baron Albert von Schrenck-Notzing in Munich. In 1923, Price exposed the medium Jan Guzyk; according to Price, the "man was clever, especially with his feet, which were almost as useful to him as his hands in producing phenomena".

Price wrote that the photographs depicting the ectoplasm of the medium Eva Carrière taken with Schrenck-Notzing looked artificial and two-dimensional, as if made from cardboard and newspaper portraits, and that there were no scientific controls as both her hands were free. In 1920, Carrière was investigated by psychical researchers in London. An analysis of her ectoplasm revealed it to be made of chewed paper. She was also investigated in 1922 and the result of the tests were negative. In 1925, Price investigated Maria Silbert and caught her using her feet and toes to move objects in the séance room. He also investigated the "direct voice" mediumship of George Valiantine in London. In the séance Valiantine claimed to have contacted the "spirit" of the composer Luigi Arditi, speaking in Italian. Price wrote down every word that was attributed to Arditi and they were found to be word-for-word matches in an Italian phrase-book.

Price formed an organisation in 1925 called the National Laboratory of Psychical Research as a rival to the Society for Psychical Research. Price had a number of disputes with the SPR, most notably over the mediumship of Rudi Schneider. Price paid mediums to test them—the SPR criticised Price and disagreed about paying mediums for testing.

Price made a formal offer to the University of London to equip and endow a Department of Psychical Research, and to loan the equipment of the National Laboratory and its library. The University of London Board of Studies in Psychology responded positively to this proposal. In 1934, the National Laboratory of Psychical Research, which held Price's collection, was reconstituted as the University of London Council for Psychical Investigation with C. E. M. Joad as chairman and with Price as Honorary Secretary and editor, although it was not an official body of the university. In the meantime, in 1927 Price joined the Ghost Club, of which he remained a member until it (temporarily) closed in 1936.

In 1927, Price claimed that he had come into possession of Joanna Southcott's box, and arranged to have it opened in the presence of one reluctant prelate (the Bishop of Grantham, not a diocesan bishop but a suffragan of the Diocese of Lincoln): it was found to contain only a few oddments and unimportant papers, among them a lottery ticket and a horse-pistol. His claims to have had the true box have been disputed by historians and by followers of Southcott. Price exposed Frederick Tansley Munnings, who claimed to produce the independent "spirit" voices of Julius Caesar, Dan Leno, Hawley Harvey Crippen and King Henry VIII. Price invented and used a piece of apparatus known as a voice control recorder and proved that all the voices were those of Munnings. In 1928, Munnings admitted fraud and sold his confessions to a Sunday newspaper.

Price was friends with other debunkers of fraudulent mediums including Harry Houdini and the journalist Ernest Palmer.

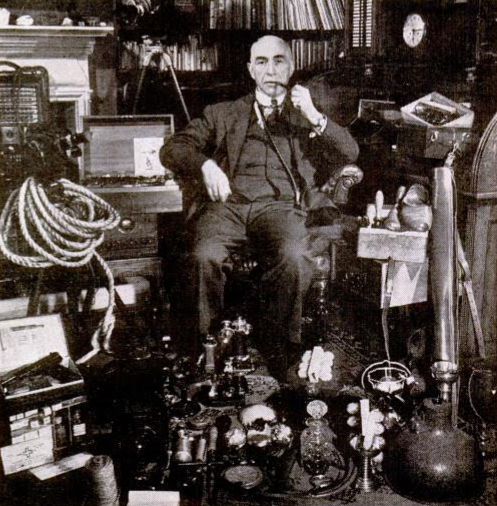
Harry Price pictured with assorted pieces of his "ghost hunting" equipment

In 1933, Frank Decker was investigated by Price at the National Laboratory of Psychical Research. Under strict scientific controls that Price contrived, Decker failed to produce any phenomena at all. Price's psychical research continued with investigations into Karachi's Indian rope trick and the fire-walking abilities of Kuda Bux in 1935. He was also involved in the formation of the National Film Library (British Film Institute) becoming its first chairman (until 1941) and was a founding member of the Shakespeare Film Society. In 1936, Price broadcast from a supposedly haunted manor house in Meopham, Kent for the BBC and published The Confessions of a Ghost-Hunter and The Haunting of Cashen's Gap. This year also saw the transfer of Price's library on permanent loan to the University of London (see external links below), followed shortly by the laboratory and investigative equipment. In 1937, he conducted further televised experiments into fire-walking with Ahmed Hussain at Carshalton and Alexandra Palace, and also rented Borley Rectory for one year. The following year, Price re-established the Ghost Club, with himself as chairman, modernising it and changing it from a spiritualist association to a group of more or less open-minded sceptics that gathered to discuss paranormal topics. He was also the first to admit women to the club.

In the same year, Price conducted experiments with Rahman Bey who was "buried alive" in Carshalton. He also drafted a Bill for the regulation of psychic practitioners. In 1939, he organised a national telepathic test in the periodical John O'London's Weekly. During the 1940s, Price concentrated on writing and the works The Most Haunted House in England, Poltergeist Over England and The End of Borley Rectory were all published.

Price was offered by the government of Nazi Germany the Red Cross Medal if he would start a department of parapsychology at the University of Bonn but the project was frustrated by the outbreak of the Second World War and he did not receive the medal or a university doctorate that had also been offered over the same project.

== Famous cases ==
=== William Hope ===
On 4 February 1922, Price, together with James Seymour, Eric Dingwall, and William Marriot, during tests conducted at the British College of Psychic Science, had proven that the spirit photographer William Hope was a fraud. Price wrote in his SPR report "William Hope has been found guilty of deliberately substituting his own plates for those of a sitter ... It implies that the medium brings to the sitting a duplicate slide and faked plates for fraudulent purposes."

Price secretly marked Hope's photographic plates and provided him with a packet of additional plates that had been covertly etched with the brand image of the Imperial Dry Plate Co. Ltd. in the knowledge that the logo would be transferred to any images created with them. Unaware that Price had tampered with his supplies, Hope then attempted to produce a number of spirit photographs. Although Hope produced several images of alleged spirits, none of his materials contained the Imperial Dry Plate Co. Ltd logo, or the marks that Price had put on Hope's original equipment, showing that he had exchanged prepared materials containing fake spirit images for the provided materials.

Price later republished the Society's experiment in a pamphlet of his own called Cold Light on Spiritualistic "Phenomena" – An Experiment with the Crewe Circle. Due to the exposure of Hope and other fraudulent spiritualists, Arthur Conan Doyle led a mass resignation of eighty-four members of the Society for Psychical Research, as they believed the Society was opposed to spiritualism. Doyle threatened to have Price evicted from his laboratory and claimed if he persisted to write "sewage" about spiritualists, he would meet the same fate as Houdini. Doyle and other spiritualists attacked Price and tried for years to have Price take his pamphlet out of circulation. Price wrote "Arthur Conan Doyle and his friends abused me for years for exposing Hope."

=== Eileen Garrett ===
On 7 October 1930 it was claimed by spiritualists that Eileen J. Garrett made contact with the spirit of Herbert Carmichael Irwin at a séance held with Price at the National Laboratory of Psychical Research two days after the R101 disaster, while attempting to contact the then recently deceased Arthur Conan Doyle, and discussed possible causes of the accident. The event "attracted worldwide attention", thanks to the presence of a reporter. Major Oliver Villiers, a friend of Brancker, Scott, Irwin, Colmore and others aboard the airship, participated in further séances with Garrett, at which he claimed to have contacted both Irwin and other victims. Price did not come to any definite conclusion about Garrett and the séances:

It is not my intention to discuss if the medium were really controlled by the discarnate entity of Irwin, or whether the utterances emanated from her subconscious mind or those of the sitters. "Spirit" or "trance personality" would be equally interesting explanations – and equally remarkable. There is no real evidence for either hypothesis. But it is not my intention to discuss hypotheses, but rather to put on record the detailed account of a remarkably interesting and thought-provoking experiment.

Garrett's claims have since been questioned. The magician John Booth analysed the mediumship of Garrett and the paranormal claims of R101 and considered her to be a fraud. According to Booth Garrett's notes and writings show she followed the building of the R101 and she may have been given aircraft blueprints by a technician from the airdrome. However, the researcher Melvin Harris who studied the case wrote no secret accomplice was needed as the information described in Garrett's séances were "either commonplace, easily absorbed bits and pieces, or plain gobbledegook. The so-called secret information just doesn't exist."

=== Rudi Schneider ===
In the 1920s and early 1930s Price investigated the medium Rudi Schneider in a number of experiments conducted at the National Laboratory of Psychical Research. Schneider claimed he could levitate objects but according to Price a photograph taken on 28 April 1932 showed that Schneider had managed to free his arm to move a handkerchief from the table. After this, many scientists considered Schneider to be exposed as a fraud. Price wrote that the findings of the other experiments should be revised due to the evidence showing how Schneider could free himself from the controls.

After Price had exposed Schneider, various scientists, such as Karl Przibram and the magician Henry Evans, wrote to Price telling him that they agreed that Schneider would evade control during his séances and congratulated Price on the success of unmasking the fraud. In opposition, SPR members who were highly critical of Price, supported Schneider's mediumship and promoted a conspiracy theory that Price had hoaxed the photograph. SPR member Anita Gregory claimed Price had deliberately faked the photograph to discredit SPR research and ruin Schneider's reputation. However, a photographic expert testified that the photograph was genuine. SPR member John L. Randall reviewed the Price and Schneider case and came to the conclusion that the photograph was genuine and that Price had caught Schneider in fraud.

=== Helen Duncan ===
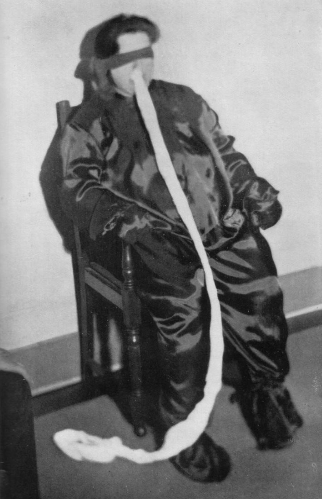
Helen Duncan with a roll of cheesecloth.

In 1931, the National Laboratory of Psychical Research took on its most illustrious case. £50 was paid to the medium Helen Duncan so that she could be examined under scientific conditions. Price was sceptical of Duncan and had her perform a number of test séances. She was suspected of swallowing cheesecloth which was then regurgitated as "ectoplasm". Price had proven through analysis of a sample of ectoplasm produced by Duncan, that it was made of cheesecloth. Duncan reacted violently at attempts to X-ray her, running from the laboratory and making a scene in the street, where her husband had to restrain her, destroying the controlled nature of the test. Price wrote that Duncan had given her fake ectoplasm to her husband to hide. The ectoplasm of Duncan in another test was analysed by psychical researchers and reported to be made from egg white. According to Price:

The sight of half-a-dozen men, each with a pair of scissors waiting for the word, was amusing. It came and we all jumped. One of the doctors got hold of the stuff and secured a piece. The medium screamed and the rest of the "teleplasm" went down her throat. This time it wasn't cheese-cloth. It proved to be paper, soaked in white of egg, and folded into a flattened tube ... Could anything be more infantile than a group of grown-up men wasting time, money, and energy on the antics of a fat female crook.

Price wrote up the case in Leaves from a Psychist's Case Book (1933) in a chapter called "The Cheese-Cloth Worshippers". In his report Price published photographs of Duncan in his laboratory that revealed fake ectoplasm made from cheesecloth, rubber gloves and cut-out heads from magazine covers which she pretended to her audience were spirits. Following the report written by Price, Duncan's former maid Mary McGinlay confessed in detail to having aided Duncan in her mediumship tricks, and Duncan's husband admitted the ectoplasm materialisations to be the result of regurgitation. Later Duncan was caught cheating again pretending to be a spirit in the séance room. During Duncan's famous trial in 1944, Price gave his results as evidence for the prosecution. This time Duncan and her travelling companions, Frances Brown, Ernest and Elizabeth Homer were prosecuted and convicted. Duncan was jailed for nine months, Brown for four months and the Homers were bound over.

=== Brocken experiment ===
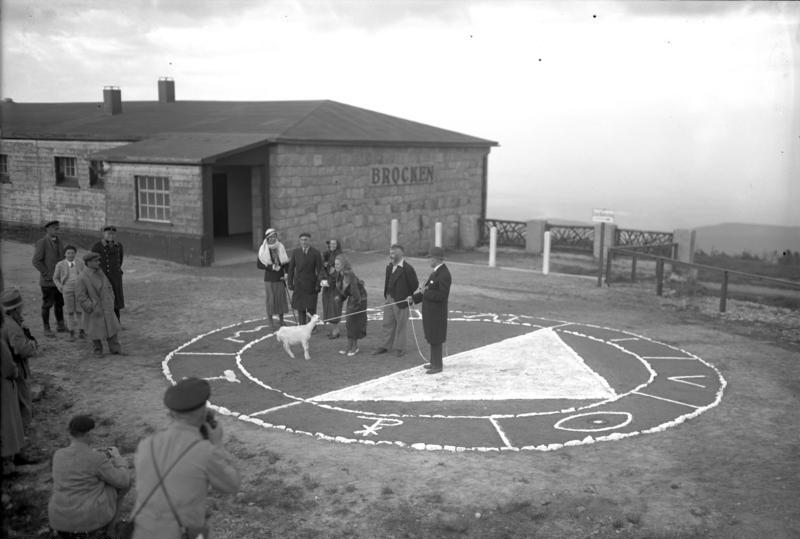
The Brocken experiment

In 1932, Price travelled to Mount Brocken in Germany with C. E. M. Joad and members of the National Laboratory to conduct a 'black magic' experiment in connection with the centenary of Goethe. The "Bloksberg Tryst", involving the transformation of a goat into a young man by the invocation of a maiden, Uta Bohn (better known as the film actress Gloria Gordon, 1881–1962), produced a great deal of publicity but not the magical transformation. Price claimed he carried out the experiment "if only to prove the fallacy of transcendental magic."

=== Gef ===
In July 1935 Price and his friend Richard Lambert went to the Isle of Man to investigate the alleged case of Gef the talking mongoose and produced the book The Haunting of Cashen's Gap (1936). In the book they avoided saying that they believed the story but were careful to report it as though with an open mind. The book reports how a hair from the alleged mongoose was sent to Julian Huxley who then sent it to naturalist F. Martin Duncan who identified it as a dog hair. Price suspected the hair belonged to the Irving's sheepdog, Mona.

Price asked Reginald Pocock of the Natural History Museum to evaluate pawprints allegedly made by Gef in plasticine together with an impression of his supposed tooth marks. Pocock could not match them to any known animal, though he conceded that one of them might have been "conceivably made by a dog". He did state that none of the markings had been made by a mongoose.

Price visited the Irvings and observed double walls of wooden panelling covering the interior rooms of the old stone farmhouse which featured considerable interior air space between stone and wood walls that "makes the whole house one great speaking-tube, with walls like soundingboards. By speaking into one of the many apertures in the panels, it should be possible to convey the voice to various parts of the house." According to Richard Wiseman "Price and Lambert were less than enthusiastic about the case, concluding that only the most credulous of individuals would be impressed with the evidence for Gef."

The diaries of James Irving, along with reports about the case, are in Harry Price's archives in the Senate House Library, University of London.

=== Borley Rectory ===
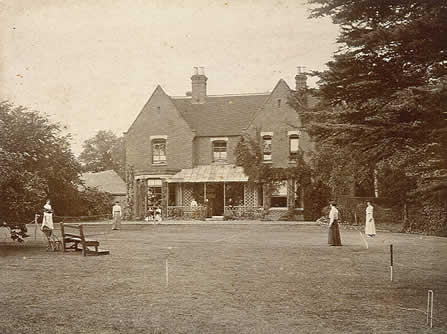
Borley Rectory in 1892

Price was most famous for his investigation into the Borley Rectory, Essex. The building became known as "the most haunted house in England" after Price published a book about it in 1940. He documented a series of alleged hauntings from the time the rectory was built in 1863. He lived in the rectory from May 1937 to May 1938 and wrote of his experiences in the book.

The psychical researcher John L. Randall wrote there was direct evidence of "dirty tricks" played upon Price by members of the SPR. On 9 October 1931, a past president of the SPR, William Henry Salter, visited the Borley Rectory in an attempt to persuade the Rector Lionel Foyster to sever his links with Price and work with the SPR instead. After Price's death in 1948, Eric Dingwall, Kathleen M. Goldney, and Trevor H. Hall, three members of the Society for Psychical Research, two of whom had been Price's most loyal associates, investigated his claims about Borley. Their findings were published in a 1956 book, The Haunting of Borley Rectory, which concluded Price had fraudulently produced some of the phenomena.

The "Borley Report", as the SPR study has become known, stated that many of the phenomena were either faked or due to natural causes such as rats and the strange acoustics attributed to the odd shape of the house. In their conclusion, Dingwall, Goldney, and Hall wrote "when analysed, the evidence for haunting and poltergeist activity for each and every period appears to diminish in force and finally to vanish away." Terence Hines wrote "Mrs. Marianne Foyster, wife of the Rev. Lionel Foyster who lived at the rectory from 1930 to 1935, was actively engaged in fraudulently creating [haunted] phenomena. Price himself ‘salted the mine’ and faked several phenomena while he was at the rectory."

Robert Hastings was one of the few SPR researchers to defend Price. Price's literary executor Paul Tabori and Peter Underwood have also defended Price against accusations of fraud. A similar approach was made by Ivan Banks in 1996. Michael Coleman in an SPR report in 1997 wrote Price's defenders are unable to rebut the criticisms convincingly.

Price's investigation of Borley was the subject of a 2013 novel by Neil Spring, titled The Ghost Hunters. The novel was subsequently adapted for television as Harry Price: Ghost Hunter, starring Rafe Spall, Cara Theobold and Richie Campbell.

=== Rosalie ===
Price claimed to have attended a private séance on 15 December 1937 in which a six-year-old girl called Rosalie appeared. Price wrote that he controlled the room by placing starch powder over the floor, locking the door and taping the windows before the séance. However, the identity of the sitters, or the locality where the séance was held was not revealed due to the alleged request of the mother of the child. During the séance Price claimed a young girl emerged; she spoke and he took her pulse. Price was suspicious that the supposed spirit of the child was no different to a human being but after the séance had finished the starch powder was undisturbed and none of the seals had been removed on the window. Price was convinced no one had entered the room via door or window during the séance. Price's Fifty Years of Psychical Research (1939) describes his experiences at the sitting and includes a diagram of the séance room.

Eric Dingwall and Trevor Hall wrote the Rosalie séance was fictitious and Price had lied about the whole affair but had based some of the details on the description of the house from a sitting he attended at a much earlier time in Brockley, South London where he used to live. K. M. Goldney who had criticised Price over his investigation into Borley Rectory wrote after the morning of the Rosalie sitting she found Price "shaken to the core by his experience." Goldney believed Price had told the truth about the séance and informed the Two Worlds spiritualist weekly newspaper that she believed the Rosalie sitting to be genuine.

In 1985, Peter Underwood published a photograph of part of an anonymous letter that was sent to the SPR member David Cohen in the 1960s which claimed to be from a séance sitter who attended the séance. The letter confessed to having impersonated the Rosalie child in the sitting by the request of the father who had owed the mother of the child money. In 2017, Paul Adams published details of the location of the Rosalie seance and identities of the family involved.

== Reception ==
Psychologist and sceptic Richard Wiseman has praised Price for his work in debunking fraudulent mediums and investigating paranormal claims. According to Wiseman "Price devoted the scientific study to weird stuff ... that both delighted the world's media and infuriated believers and sceptics alike." The stage magician and scientific sceptic James Randi wrote that Price accomplished some valuable and genuine research but lived "a strange mixture of fact and fraud."

Psychical researcher Renée Haynes described Price as "one of the most fascinating and storm-provoking figures in psychical research." Science writer Mary Roach in her book Spook: Science Tackles the Afterlife (2010) favourably mentioned Price's methods and research in debunking the fraudulent medium Helen Duncan.

Several biographies have been written about Price. Paul Tabori's biography (1950) is generally sympathetic. Historian Trevor H. Hall's (1978) is much more critical. The latest biography by Richard Morris (2006) is also critical, concluding that Price should best be remembered as a "supreme bluffer, a hedonistic con man, a terrific raconteur, a great conjuror, a gifted writer and a wonderful eccentric."

== Death and legacy ==
Price experienced a massive heart attack at his home in Pulborough, West Sussex and died almost instantly on 29 March 1948. He was buried in the churchyard of St Mary's, Pulborough.

His archives were deposited with the University of London between 1976 and 1978 by his widow. They include his correspondence, drafts of his publications, papers relating to libel cases, reports on his investigations, press cuttings and photographs. His collection of magic books and periodicals is held at Senate House Library, part of the University of London and is called the Harry Price Library of Magical Literature. The collection, which includes 13,000 items, was established by a bequest from his estate in 1948.

== In popular media ==
Price has been depicted in documentary and dramatic works, including the following:

- Arthur C. Clarke's World of Strange Powers, episode 13, "Strange Powers: The Verdict" (1985)
- Harry Price: Ghost Hunter, 2005 documentary by Sky television, presented by Tom Baker
- The Ghost Hunters, 2013 novel by Neil Spring
- Harry Price: Ghost Hunter, 2015 drama (based on the 2013 novel) broadcast on ITV 1 starring Rafe Spall as Price
- Borley Rectory, 2017 animated documentary featuring Jonathan Rigby as the voice of Price
- The Ghosts of Borley Rectory, 2021 feature film starring Toby Wynn-Davies as Price
- Nandor Fodor and the Talking Mongoose, 2023 feature film which features Christopher Lloyd as Price.

== Published works ==
- Price, Harry (1993). Poltergeist: Tales of the Supernatural. London: Bracken Books. ISBN 1-85891-084-6.
- Revelations of a Spirit Medium, with Eric Dingwall, Kegan Paul, Trench, Trubner & Co. Ltd, London, 1922.
- Cold Light on Spiritualistic "Phenomena" – An Experiment with the Crewe Circle, Kegan Paul, Trench, Trubner & Co., 1922.
- Stella C. An Account of Some Original Experiments in Psychical Research, Hurst & Blackett, 1925.
- Rudi Schneider: A Scientific Examination of his Mediumship, Methuen & Co., London, 1930.
- Leaves from a Psychist's Case Book, Victor Gollancz, London, 1933.
- Confessions of a Ghost-Hunter, Putnam & Co., 1936.
- The Haunting of Cashen's Gap: A Modern "Miracle" Investigated – with R.S. Lambert, Methuen & Co., 1936.
- Fifty Years of Psychical Research: A Critical Survey Longmans, Green & Co., 1939.
- The Most Haunted House in England: Ten Years' Investigation of Borley Rectory, Longmans, Green & Co., 1940.
- Search for Truth: My Life for Psychical Research, Collins, 1942.
- Poltergeist Over England: Three Centuries of Mischievous Ghosts, Country Life, 1945.
- The End of Borley Rectory, Harrap & Co., 1946.

== See also ==
- Psychic telephone

== Bibliography ==
- Harry Price, Biography of a Ghost Hunter by Paul Tabori, Athenaem Press, hardback, 1950. (Reprinted in 1974 by Sphere Books)
- Leaves from a Psychist's Case Book, by Harry Price, Victor Gollancz Ltd., hardback, 1933.
- Harry Price: The Psychic Detective by Richard Morris, Sutton Publishing hardback, 2006. ISBN 0-7509-4271-1.
- Trevor Hall (October 1978). Search for Harry Price. Gerald Duckworth and Company. ISBN 0-7156-1143-7.
