= George Valiantine =

American direct voice medium

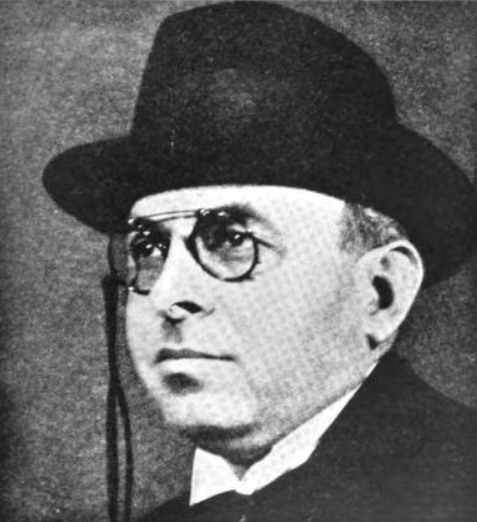
George Valiantine

George Valiantine (1874–1947) was an American direct voice medium who was exposed as a fraud.

== Biography ==
Valiantine was born in Williamsport, Pennsylvania. He worked as a manufacturer before he discovered mediumship. He gave séances in America and Europe. Valiantine predicted in the 1920s that aliens would visit earth. He also claimed contact with spirit guides known as Hawk Chief and Kokum.

== Fraud ==
British spiritualist author Herbert Dennis Bradley defended Valiantine as a genuine medium and wrote two books about his mediumship. Researcher Melvin Harris has written that Bradley was naïve and easily duped. However, Bradley later admitted he caught Valiantine cheating. In 1931, Bradley wrote a book that exposed Valiantine as a fraud.

Voices were heard in the séances of Valiantine and he always used a trumpet but denied that he had spoken through it. Psychical researcher Ernest Palmer had investigated the trumpet after a séance and discovered "a good deal of moisture" inside the mouth piece, which indicated that it been spoken into by an ordinary human and not a spirit.

Valiantine entered for the Scientific American prize of $2,500, to be awarded to any medium producing spiritualist phenomenon under test conditions. In the test Valiantine produced movement of a trumpet in the dark séance room, however, an electrical connection had been rigged to his chair which was connected to a light in an adjoining room which revealed that all the trumpet activity coincided with when he left his chair. Valiantine had not known his chair was wired. Psychical researcher Harry Price described the test séance:

At the final sitting, in complete darkness, on May 26, 1923, special apparatus was installed. This was an electrical circuit which included the chair on which the medium sat. When the medium rose from his seat, a light went out in an adjoining room. Dictaphone notes were taken of all that occurred. It was found that Valiantine left his chair fifteen times (when he should have been in it), sometimes for as long as eighteen seconds, and that these periods corresponded with those when the sitters were touched by the 'spirits'.

Valiantine did not collect the award as he had cheated and was pronounced a fraud by the Scientific American committee.

In 1925, Harry Price investigated the "direct voice" mediumship of Valiantine in London. In the séance Valiantine claimed to have contacted the "spirit" of the composer Luigi Arditi who spoke Italian. Price wrote down every word that was attributed to Arditi and they were found to be word-for-word matches in an Italian phrase-book. Price also discovered that Valiantine had studied the telephone directory to obtain information. In 1931, Valiantine was exposed as a fraud in the séance room as he produced fraudulent "spirit" fingerprints in wax. The "spirit" thumbprint that Valiantine claimed belonged to Arthur Conan Doyle was revealed to be the print of his big toe on his right foot. It was also revealed that Valiantine made some of the prints with his elbow.
