= Neil Spring =

Welsh novelist

Neil Spring (born 8 June 1981) is a Welsh novelist of supernatural horror, known for his bestselling books, The Ghost Hunters (2013) and The Lost Village (2017).

== Education ==
Spring holds a BA in Philosophy, Politics and Economics (PPE) from Somerville College, Oxford University, where he wrote a thesis on the significance of paranormal events.

== Works ==
=== The Ghost Hunters ===
Spring's debut work was published by Quercus in 2013. The novel is based on the life of the controversial British ghost hunter Harry Price, a psychic investigator from the inter-war years, who made Borley Rectory in Essex briefly famous as "the most haunted house in England". Spring says the book took three years to research and write.

The Ghost Hunters received positive reviews from critics. The Sunday Times Culture Magazine described it as "serpentine and surprising in its plotting." The Metro described the novel as "a substantial fictional sweetmeat with a kernel of truth." ITV1 commissioned a 2-hour film based on the book, Harry Price: Ghost Hunter, from Bentley Productions. Written by Jack Lothian, it was first broadcast on 27 December 2015.

=== The Watchers ===
Quercus published Spring's second novel in September 2015. Based on true events, the novel is a "spooky, historical thriller" set during the Cold War in a remote coastal village whose residents live in the shadow of an ancient secret.

Described as ‘explosive’ by the Daily Express, The Watchers concerns UFO sightings during the Cold War and television rights were optioned after an eight-way auction. Spring was inspired to write the novel after uncovering a declassified MoD document which suggests top-ranking officials carried out a covert inquiry into the 1977 UFO sightings in Wales.

To mark the 40th anniversary of the sighting, Spring returned to the scene of the events in February 2017 along with one of the original witnesses. Spring's interview about his inspiration for the novel was broadcast on BBC1's The One Show in 2017.

In 2019, Spring announced that the television and film rights to the book had reverted to him.

=== The Lost Village ===
Spring's third novel is set in the abandoned Wiltshire village of Imber and again features Harry Price. It was published by Quercus in October 2017.

The Lost Village received positive reviews. The Lady described the book as "chilling… an intelligent ghost story." The Sunday Express S Magazine described it as "Spooky and tense with a truly horrifying denouement."

After reading The Lost Village, screenwriter and novelist Stephen Volk described Spring as "…Agatha Christie meets James Herbert."

=== The Burning House ===
Quercus published Spring’s fourth novel, in 2019. Set on the wooded shores of Loch Ness, the novel is inspired by life of the ceremonial magician and occultist, Aleister Crowley.

According to the Lancashire Evening Post, the novel is "Brimming with suspense and ghostly apparitions…a scorching thriller… moves at a cracking pace and has a stunning twist."

=== The Haunted Shore ===
In October 2020, Quercus published Spring's fifth novel, a stand-alone chiller provisionally entitled The Haunted Shore. The novel is described as "A terrifying tale of secrets long buried, lies and obsession."
