= Ancaster House, Pulborough =

Building in West Sussex

Ancaster House
- Interactive map of the Ancaster House area

General information
- Location: Ancaster House; 2 Church Place; Pulborough
- Coordinates: 50.9591°N 0.5102°W
- Construction started: 18th century

Technical details
- Floor count: 2

Ancaster House in Ancaster Place, Pulborough, West Sussex is a Grade II listed building.

The range dates from the 18th century, though the front, of ashlar and red brick dressing, dates from 1900.
