= Carlton Theatre Group =

Carlton Theatre Group (formerly Carlton Dramatic Society) is an Amateur Dramatics group, based in Wimbledon, London, United Kingdom.

The troupe was formed by a group of enthusiasts from Wimbledon Park and Southfields in 1927. These included ghosthunter and playwright Harry Price, who used the society to perform his first play. During the Second World War its activities were suspended by the Emergency Powers (Defence) Act 1939. In 1946 the group returned to the stage in a production of Agatha Christie's And Then There Were None (using the original title).

In 1963 the society toured the major churches of South East England with a production of Everyman, culminating in two nights at St Paul's in Covent Garden and St Matthew's in Slough. Prince Philip aware of the hype surrounding the production invited the society to perform the play in St. George's Chapel, Windsor Castle. This single performance was on Maundy Thursday and the entire British royal family were present for the Easter break. The cast was presented afterwards and the Queen told the cast that she had been 'very moved'.

Carlton celebrated its 80th birthday in 2007 with a 1920s themed party which was attended by over 100 members, past and present.

The group continues to perform a wide range of plays around Wimbledon. They perform regularly at the Studio at New Wimbledon Theatre. In recent years their repertoire has included Shakespeare, Mike Bartlett, Jessica Swale and Terence Rattigan.

In 2018 the Group won three awards from the National Operatic and Dramatic Association, including best male and female actors, for their summer production of The Importance of Being Earnest.

The president of the society until her death in 2018 was June Whitfield. In 2019 the actor, director and playwright David Wood agreed to become the society's president.
