= C. E. Bechhofer Roberts =

British journalist and writer (1894–1949)

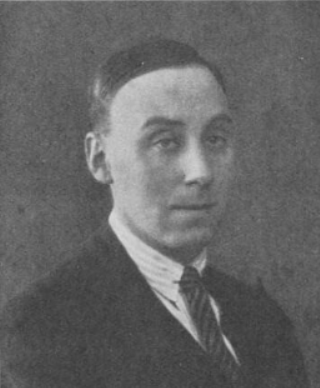
- Born: 21 November 1894; London, England
- Died: 14 December 1949 (aged 55)
- Occupations: Barrister, journalist, psychical researcher, writer

Carl Eric Bechhofer Roberts (21 November 1894 – 14 December 1949) was a British author, barrister, and journalist.

== Biography ==
Roberts was born and raised in London but relocated to Germany to study classics. He worked as a professional writer, producing works on travel, biography, criminology, fiction, paranormal, translation and drama. He contributed to The New Age magazine.

During World War I he was a trooper of the 9th Lancers. He met Grigori Rasputin during a visit in Saint Petersburg.

Roberts met Gurdjieff in Tiflis in 1919. His book In Denikin's Russia and the Caucasus, 1919-1920 (1921) contained the first description of Gurdjieff published in English. His 1928 novel This Side Idolatry (by the pseudonym "Ephesian") was the first public presentation of the relationship between Charles Dickens and the actress Ellen Ternan.

He was private secretary to Lord Birkenhead (1924–1930). His books were recommended by George Orwell.

Roberts died in a motor accident in December 1949.

== Psychical research ==
Roberts took interest in psychical research and spiritualism, but approached these subjects from a mostly skeptical position.

He was the author of The Mysterious Madame: A Life of Madame Blavatsky (1931), a highly critical biography of Helena Blavatsky. In his book The Truth about Spiritualism (1932) he came to the conclusion that there is no evidence for the spirit hypothesis in mediumship. According to the research of Roberts all séance and spiritualist phenomena can be explained by "telepathy, self-deception, fraud or neurosis".

Roberts was convinced that the medium Helen Duncan was a fraud and wrote a foreword to the book The Trial of Mrs. Duncan (1945) by Helena Normanton.

== Publications ==
Non-fiction

- Russia at the Cross-Roads (1916)
- A Russian Anthology in English (1917)
- Through Starving Russia (1921)
- In Denikin's Russia and the Caucasus, 1919-1920 (1921)
- A Wanderer’s Log (1922)
- The Literary Renaissance in America (1923)
- Lord Birkenhead: being an account of the life of F.E. Smith, first earl of Birkenhead (1926)
- Winston Churchill (1927)
- Philip Snowden: An Impartial Portrait (1929)
- The Mysterious Madame: A Life of Madame Blavatsky (1931)
- The Truth about Spiritualism (1932)
- Nurse Cavell: A Play in Three Acts (1933)
- The new world of crime; famous American trials (1933)
- Sir Travers Humphreys: His Career and Cases (1936)
- Stanley Baldwin: Man or Miracle (1936)
- Paul Verlaine (1937)
- Sir John Simon: Being an Account of the Life And Career of John Allesbrook Simon (1938)
- Famous American Trials (1947)

Fiction

- This Side Idolatry (1928, as "Ephesian")
- The Coat of Many Colours (1930, as "Ephesian")
- The Jury Disagree (1934, with George Goodchild)
- A. B. C.’s Test Case (1936, as "Ephesian")
- Bread and Butter. A Novel based on the Life of W. M. Thackeray (1936, as "Ephesian")
- A. B. C. Investigates (1937, as "Ephesian")
- A. B. C. Solves Five (1937, as "Ephesian")
- We Shot an Arrow (1939, with George Goodchild)
- The Dear Old Gentleman (1940, with George Goodchild)
- Let’s Begin Again (1940)
- Danger Abroad (1942)
- Don Chicago (1944)
- Sunrise in the West (1945)

== See also ==
- E. Clephan Palmer
