= Pulborough Signal Box =

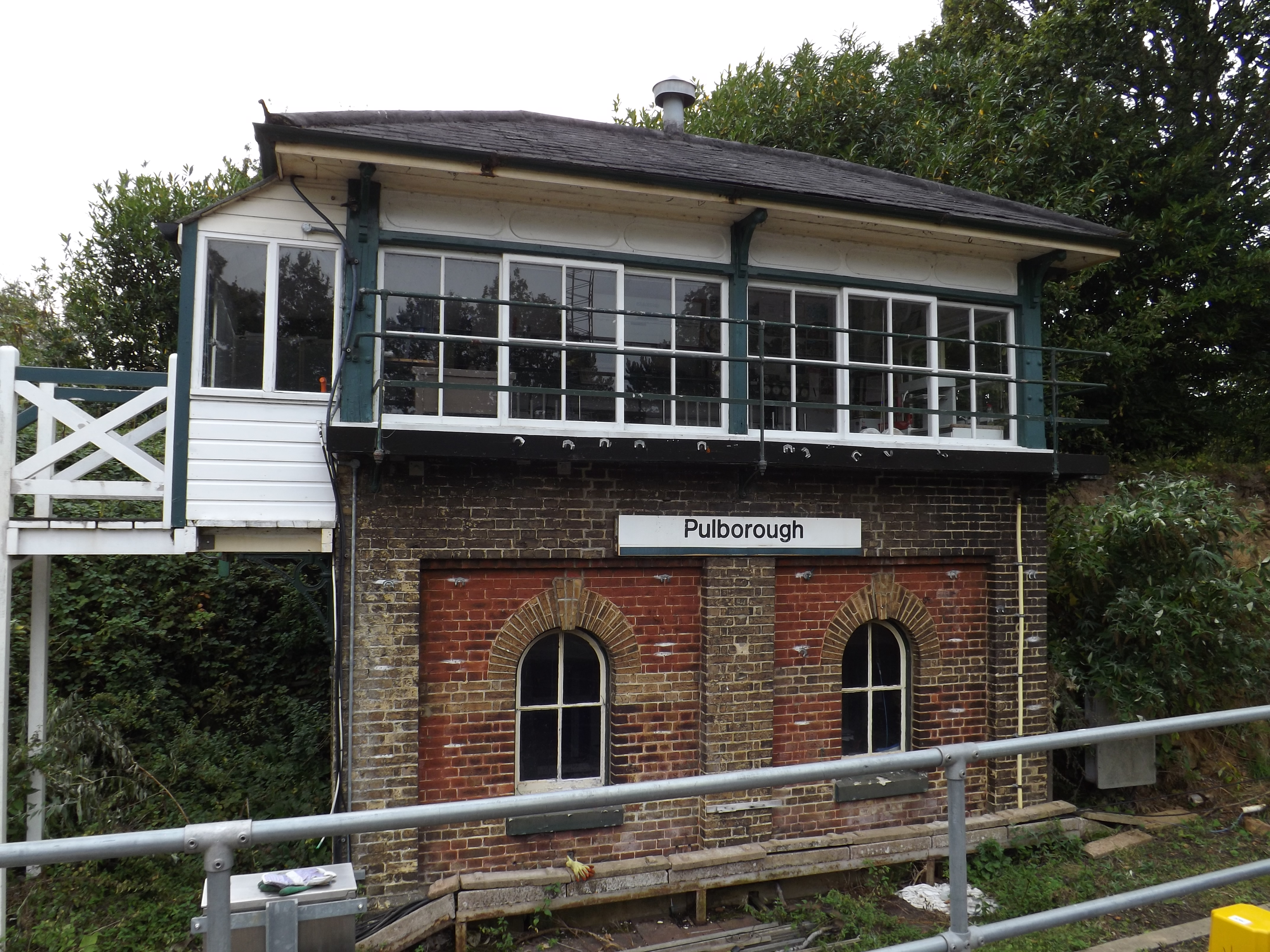
- The signal box in 2014
- Interactive map of the Pulborough Signal Box area

General information
- Coordinates: 50.958574°N 0.515557°W

Design and construction
- Awards and prizes: Grade II listed (2013)

Pulborough Signal Box is a signal box in Pulborough, Sussex. It has been Grade II listed building since 13 August 2013.

The box was built in 1878 and was a Saxby and Farmer type 5 design. This design was used from 1876 to 1896. This particular box has two stories, with the locking room on the ground floor and the operations room on the floor above. It is rectangular, two bays long by one bay wide.
