= E. Clephan Palmer =

British author, journalist and psychical researcher

- Born: 1883; Ipswich
- Died: 4 July 1954 (aged 70–71); Blyth, Suffolk
- Occupation: Journalist

Ernest Clephan Palmer (1883 – 4 July 1954) was a British author, journalist and psychical researcher.

== Biography ==
Palmer was born in Ipswich and worked for forty years as an editor for the Daily News and the News Chronicle. For twenty-three years Palmer was a member of the Parliamentary Press Gallery and its Chairman in 1951. Throughout his career he also worked for the West Sussex Gazette, the Daily Express, the Morning Leader and the Daily Mail.

Palmer was Parliamentary Correspondent for the News Chronicle and with the support of his friend Arthur Conan Doyle was involved in solving the Oscar Slater case by securing Slater's release twenty years after his conviction. He served in France and Flanders in the First World War. He married Claudine Pattie Sapey, they had two sons. His son Peter Clephan Palmer was awarded the C.B.E.

Palmer was interested in animal welfare. His book The Solitary Blackbird published in 1954 described his and his wife's experiences in caring for a young blackbird.

== Psychical research ==
Palmer was interested in psychical research and spiritualism, he was a friend of the psychical investigator Harry Price. In his book The Riddle of Spiritualism published in 1927, Palmer came to the conclusion that most mediumship and phenomena observed in the séance is the result of fraud, however, he believed telepathy to explain some cases of mental mediumship. He wrote there is no scientific evidence for the spirit hypothesis in mediumship but the question of survival should still be kept open.

== Publications ==
- The Riddle of Spiritualism (1927)
- The Young Blackbird (1953)
- The Solitary Blackbird (1954)

== See also ==
- C. E. Bechhofer Roberts
