= Chequers Hotel, Pulborough =

Historic building in West Sussex, England

Chequers Hotel
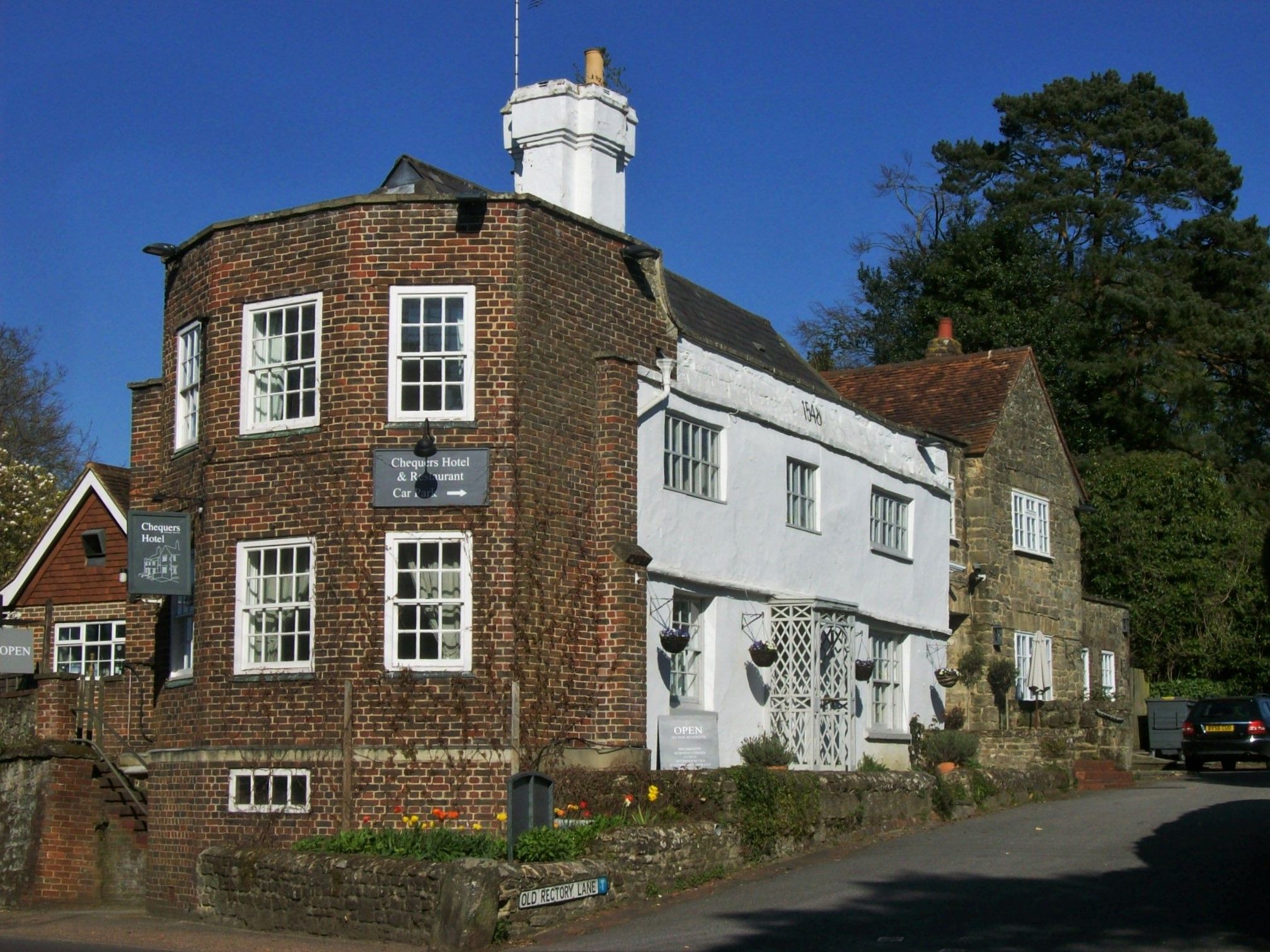
- Interactive map of the Chequers Hotel area

General information
- Coordinates: 50.95895°N 0.509316°W

The Chequers Hotel is a hotel and Grade II listed building in West Sussex, England.

The building is 18th century or earlier, but with modern additions.
