= Ethel Walker =

Scottish painter (1861–1951)

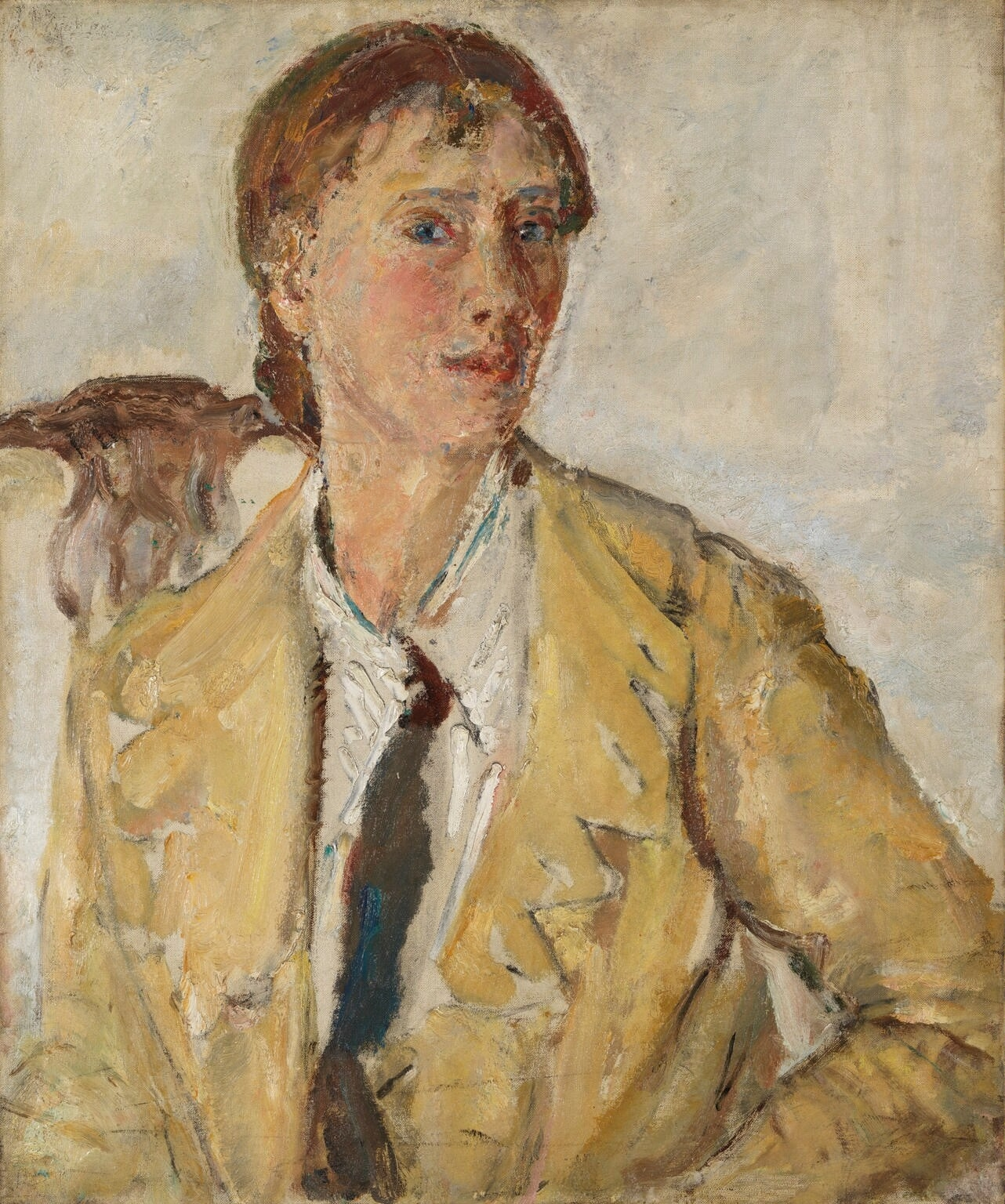
- Self-portrait c. 1925
- Born: 9 June 1861; Edinburgh, Scotland
- Died: 2 March 1951 (aged 89); London, England

Dame Ethel Walker DBE ARA (9 June 1861 – 2 March 1951) was a Scottish painter of portraits, flower-pieces, sea-pieces and decorative compositions. From 1936, Walker was a member of The London Group. Her work displays the influence of Impressionism, Puvis de Chavannes, Gauguin and Asian art. Walker achieved considerable success throughout her career, becoming the first female member elected to the New English Art Club in 1900. Walker's works were exhibited widely during her lifetime, at the Royal Academy, the Royal Society of Arts and at the Lefevre Gallery. She represented Britain at the Venice Biennale four times, in 1922, 1924, 1928 and 1930. Although Walker proclaimed that 'there is no such thing as a woman artist. There are only two kinds of artist — bad and good', she was elected Honorary President of the Women's International Art Club in 1932.

Soon after her death, Walker was the subject of a major retrospective at the Tate in 1951 alongside Gwen John and Frances Hodgkins. Walker is now acknowledged as a lesbian artist, a fact which critics have noted is boldly apparent in her preference for women sitters and female nudes. It has been suggested that Walker was one of the earliest lesbian artists to explore her sexuality openly in her works. While Walker was contemporarily regarded as one of the foremost British women artists, her influence diminished after her death, perhaps due in part to her celebration of female sexuality. Made a Dame Commander of the Order of the British Empire in 1943, Walker was one of only four women artists to receive the honour as of 2010.

== Early life ==
Walker was born on 9 June 1861 in Edinburgh, the younger child of Arthur Abney Walker (from Rotherham, South Yorkshire) and his second wife, Isabella (née Robertson), a Scot. Her father was from Rotherham's Walker family of iron founders. Her secondary education was at Brondesbury in London, where she was taught drawing by Hector Caffierti.

Following secondary school, Walker attended the Ridley School of Art. In 1880 she met fellow artist Clara Christian (1868-1906), and the two began living, working and studying together. She attended Putney School of Art, and visited Madrid, where she made copies of works by Velázquez. She attended the Westminster School of Art in London, where a then popular artist, Frederick Brown, was a teacher. Around 1893 she followed Brown to the Slade School of Art for further study. While at the Slade, she also took evening painting classes with Walter Sickert. She would return to the Slade School in 1912 and 1916 to study fresco and tempera painting; and again in 1921 to study sculpture with James Havard Thomas.

== Professional art career ==
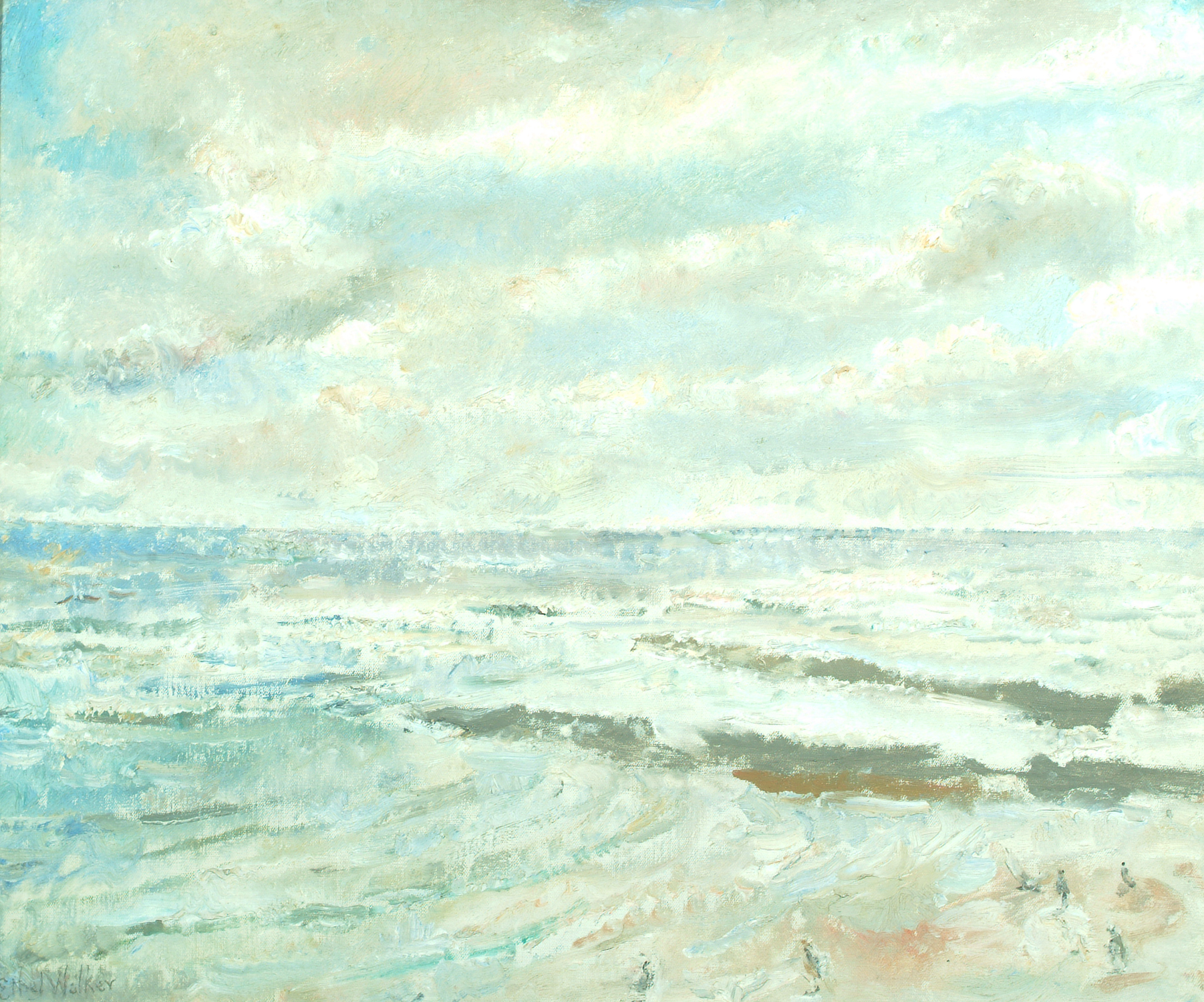
Robin Hood's Bay, Aberdeen Art Gallery

Walker produced a large body of works from different genres, to include flowers, seascapes, landscapes and mythical subjects. Her influences included Greek and Renaissance art, as well as Chinese painting and Taoist philosophy. She also took interest in the female form. Walker is best known for her portraits of the female form, paying particular attention to the detail of the sitter's/model's expression and individual temperament. Her obvious, tactical brush strokes obscure unnecessary details, thereby allowing her to emphasize the aspects of the mood of the moment.

Walker was a supporter of the natural female form, often publicly rebuking other women for wearing makeup and heavy clothing that hid their form. Her models were never allowed to wear makeup, lipstick, or nail polish during sittings. She painted a series of works that reflected mythological themes, and several works depicting nude female models.

In one piece, titled Invocation, Walker used 25 female models, all either scantly clad or nude, kneeling around three female models who are wearing sheer cloth. Birds are depicted fluttering overhead in the painting. It is considered her most detailed piece.

Walker's works throughout her career seemed to capture the human spirit while celebrating the beauty of the female body. The art produced by Walker, who died in London, did have a positive and thought-provoking impact on art as a whole. Her art is regularly displayed in exhibits at many galleries, most notably The Gatehouse Gallery in Glasgow, Scotland. She was elected an Associate of the Royal Academy in 1940.

As a portraitist, Walker’s subjects varied from casual acquaintances to close friends and associates. Walker painted fellow artists Lucien Pissarro, Nicolette Macnamara and Orovida Camille Pissarro, as well as society figures including the American-British politician Nancy Astor, the Countess of Strathcona and the magazine and book editor Joan Werner Laurie and author Leo Walmsley. Walker’s friendship with Astor was damaged after Walker refused to alter the finished painting to Astor’s mannerly specifications and declared Astor a snob. In the autumn of 1933, Walker met the actress Flora Robson and the actor Charles Laughton and painted at least two portraits of Robson. It was at this time that he commissioned Walker to paint his wife Elsa Lanchester as Prue in William Congreve’s Love for Love, in which all three actors starred at Sadler’s Wells in March 1934. Walker painted the young Barbara Hepworth while she was staying in Robin Hood’s Bay, where Walker owned a cottage overlooking the sea. Walker also painted at least two known studies of the young Christopher Robin Milne, one of which is known to have hung in the study of A. A. Milne, the author of Winnie-the-Pooh.

== Personal life ==
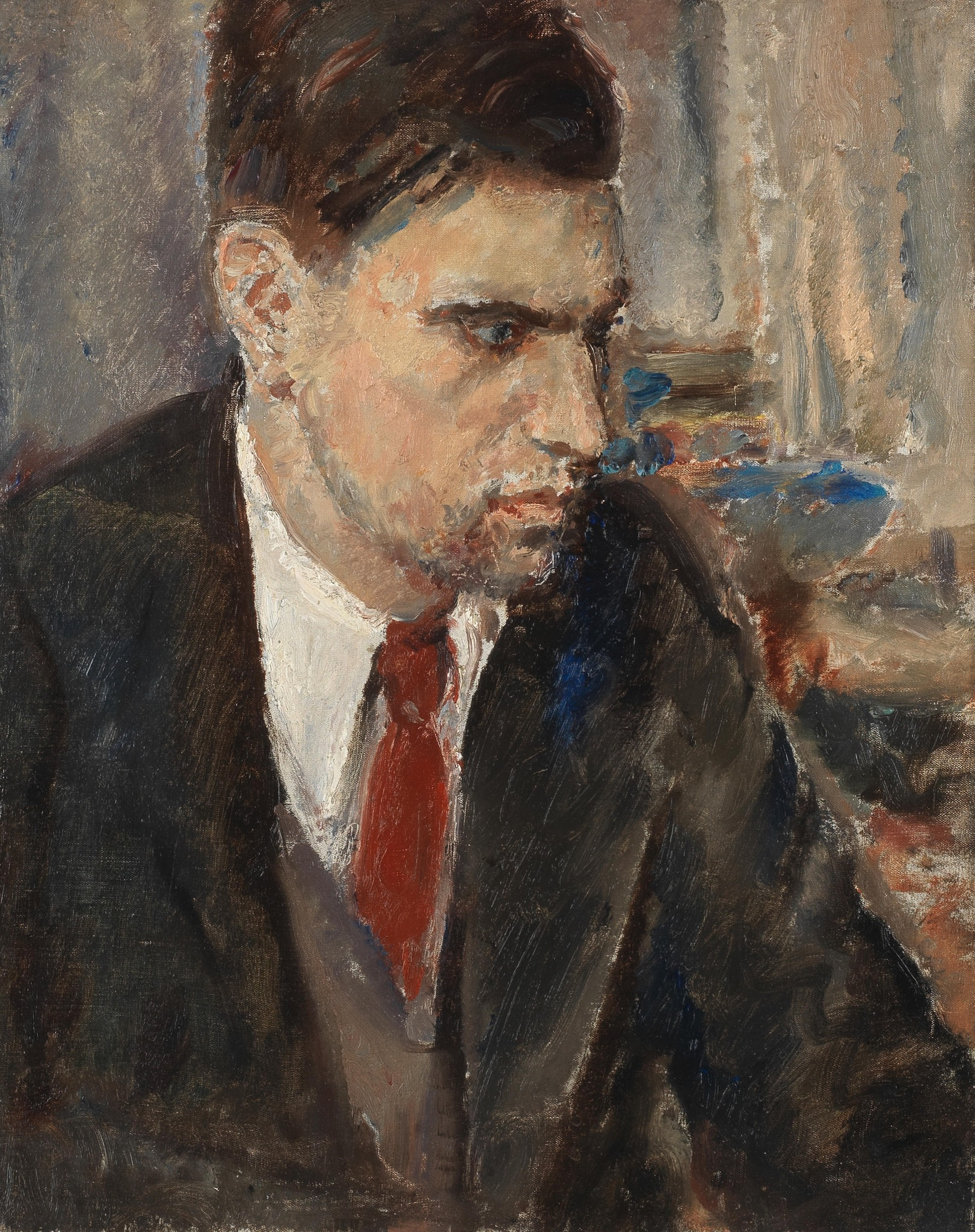
Young Man with a Red Tie. Red ties were a symbol of queerness amongst men of the period.

Walker was regarded as an especially social artist, living for many years in her studio at Cheyne Walk, Chelsea, and took an active part in the artistic life of the area. The influential Irish novelist, writer, and critic George Moore recognised Walker's talent, and introduced her to French Impressionism when she met him in Paris returning to London from a visit to Spain. Moore later lent Walker use of his flat in Victoria Street, London, where she painted Angela, which saw her accepted to the New English Art School. Among Walker's friends was the writer William Rothenstein, who in March 1935 honoured Walker with a dinner at the Belgrave Hotel attended by some seventy guests, including Bloomsbury Group members Virginia Woolf, Duncan Grant, and Vanessa Bell, alongside fellow artists Wilson Steer and Henry Tonks. Woolf recalled in her diary that she had 'great fun at Ethel's party last night, & I enjoyed myself enormously'. Walker had also offered to paint Woolf nude, as Woolf described in a letter: 'I am going to be painted, stark naked, by a woman called Ethel Walker who says I am the image of Lilith'. Walker painted Woolf's sister Bell in 1937, seated in a domestic interior possibly being that of Charleston Farmhouse.

Rothenstein's son, the Tate Director John Rothenstein, regarded Walker as the most supremely vain artist he was acquainted with. Walker wrote in a letter urging Rothenstein to purchase more of her works on behalf of the gallery that, 'every purchase of my work strengthens and enriches the sum of the good pictures at the Tate Gallery'. Walker gave lessons to the young Cathleen Mann, whom she continued to influence upon Mann's enrolment at the Slade School of Fine Art. The two women often exhibited alongside one another in group exhibitions.

Walker was disapproving of cosmetics, and was known to rebuke women in public on account of their makeup. She required her models to remove lipstick and nail polish before entering her studio. One friend recollected: ‘She executed commissions when she liked the look of the would-be sitters but before painting her women she would say “Take that filthy stuff off your lips” for, always faithful to the motif, she could not tolerate the sudden assault of red upon an eye so sensitive to tone'. Speaking to the art dealer Lillian Browse, Walker stated, 'if you take that filthy stuff off your face [lipstick] I would like to paint a portrait of you'.

In her eighties, Walker befriended the Polish artist Marian Kratochwil, who had fled occupied Europe and arrived penniless in London in 1947. Walker was too old to support Kratochwil's career as she might have hoped, and Kratochwil drew the artist lying on her death-bed. Upon Walker's death, Kratochwil learnt that she had secretly made him beneficiary of her estate, which included the remaining canvases in her studio. Along with his wife Kathleen Browne, the Kratochwils later gifted many of these works to galleries including seven works presented to The Courtauld Institute of Art in 1973.

== Exhibitions and market ==
Walker exhibited widely during her lifetime, and achieved considerable recognition. For comparison, her contemporary Gwen John was only featured in one major exhibition during her own lifetime, alongside her preeminent brother Augustus John. Walker began exhibiting at the Royal Academy from 1898. Throughout the 1920s, Walker was one of the most frequently exhibited women artists in the annual Summer Exhibition, alongside Laura Knight and Dod Procter.

After Walker's painting Angela was featured in an 1899 exhibition of the New English Art Club, she became its first female member in 1900.

A 1913 review noted an apparently outstanding quality of Walker's works: 'By far the most interesting painter in the present show is Miss Ethel Walker [...] Miss Walker sees delicately and paints delicately. She has made up her mind in a very definite way and expresses it without hesitation. Her work is the strongest in the gallery, and it is also the most unmistakably feminine'.

From 1930 onwards, Walker held many exhibitions at the Lefevre Gallery, including: April 1931, March 1933, January–February 1935, April 1939, October 1942, and November 1949. Walker also exhibited over a long period with The Redfern Gallery, including exhibitions in 1932 and 1952.

In 1938, Queen Elizabeth The Queen Mother, a keen collector of art, purchased Walker's At Sea on an October Morning for £750. The Queen's interest in Walker was likely influenced by her artistic mentor Jasper Ridley, whose collection included a number of works by Walker.

In 1951, The Tate held a major retrospective entitled Ethel Walker, Frances Hodgkins, Gwen John: A Memorial Exhibition, organised by the Tate Director John Rothenstein, a friend of Walker's. The exhibition was well received by critics, including one writing in The Spectator who impressed the significant contribution of each artist: 'It would be ungenerous to attempt to weigh the relative importance of the three women painters [...] for together they form the greater part of woman's contribution to British painting in this century'.

As of 2008, women artists constituted only 10% of the Tate collection. Of these, Walker is one of a select few represented by numerous works.

In 2017, Walker's large work Decoration: The Excursion of Nausicaa was included in the Tate Britain exhibition Queer British Art 1861-1967.

15 paintings by Walker were selected for exhibition by Piano Nobile at Frieze Masters, the pre-2000 arm of the renowned Frieze Art Fair. Notable works of the display included Decoration: Evening (1936).

An auction record was set for a painting by Walker when her Flower Piece, exhibited at the New Zealand Centennial Exhibition, was sold at David Duggleby Auctioneers for £24,500 (hammer). The work had carried an estimate of £200-£400.

== Gallery ==
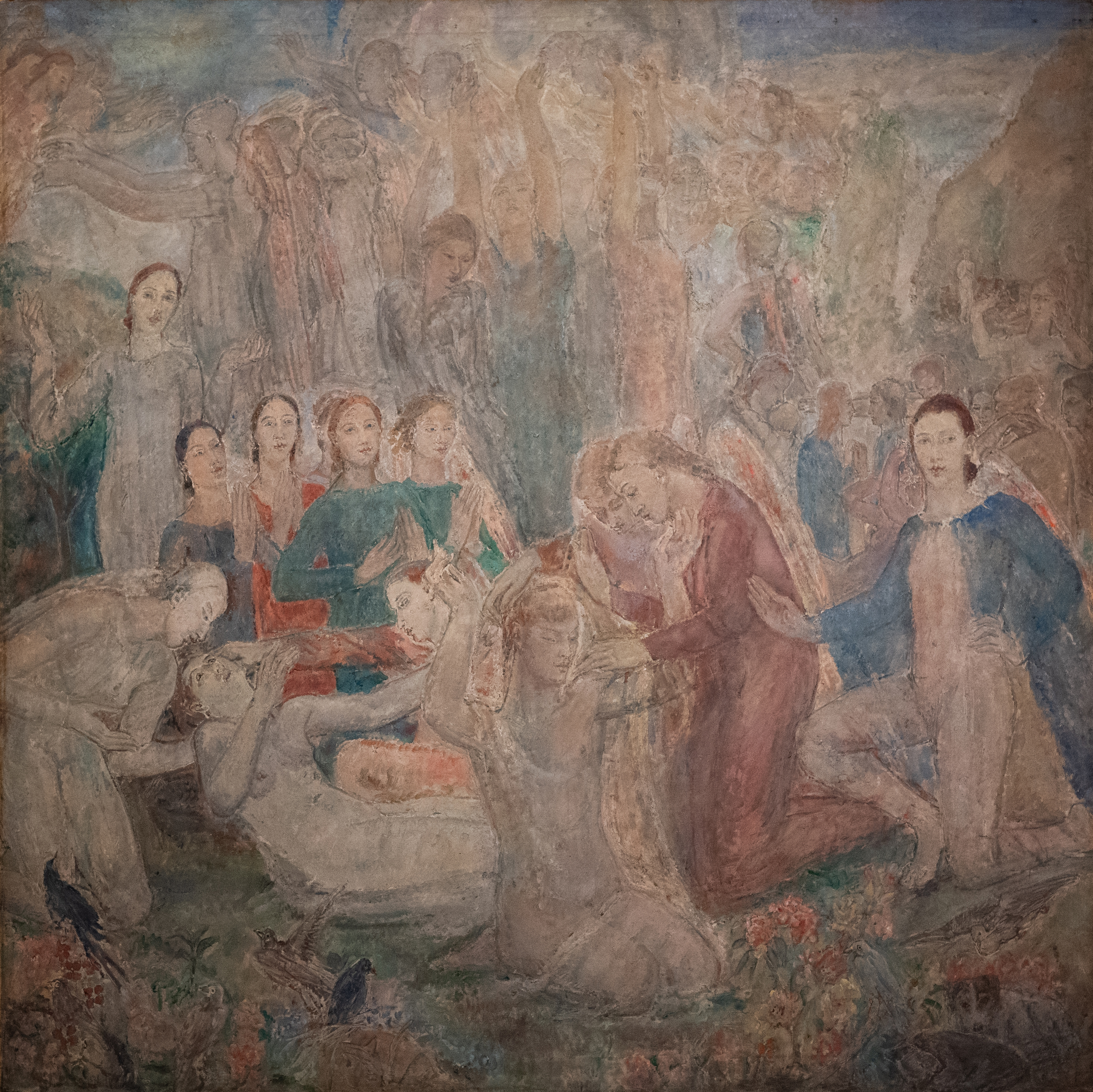
The Zone of Love: Decoration

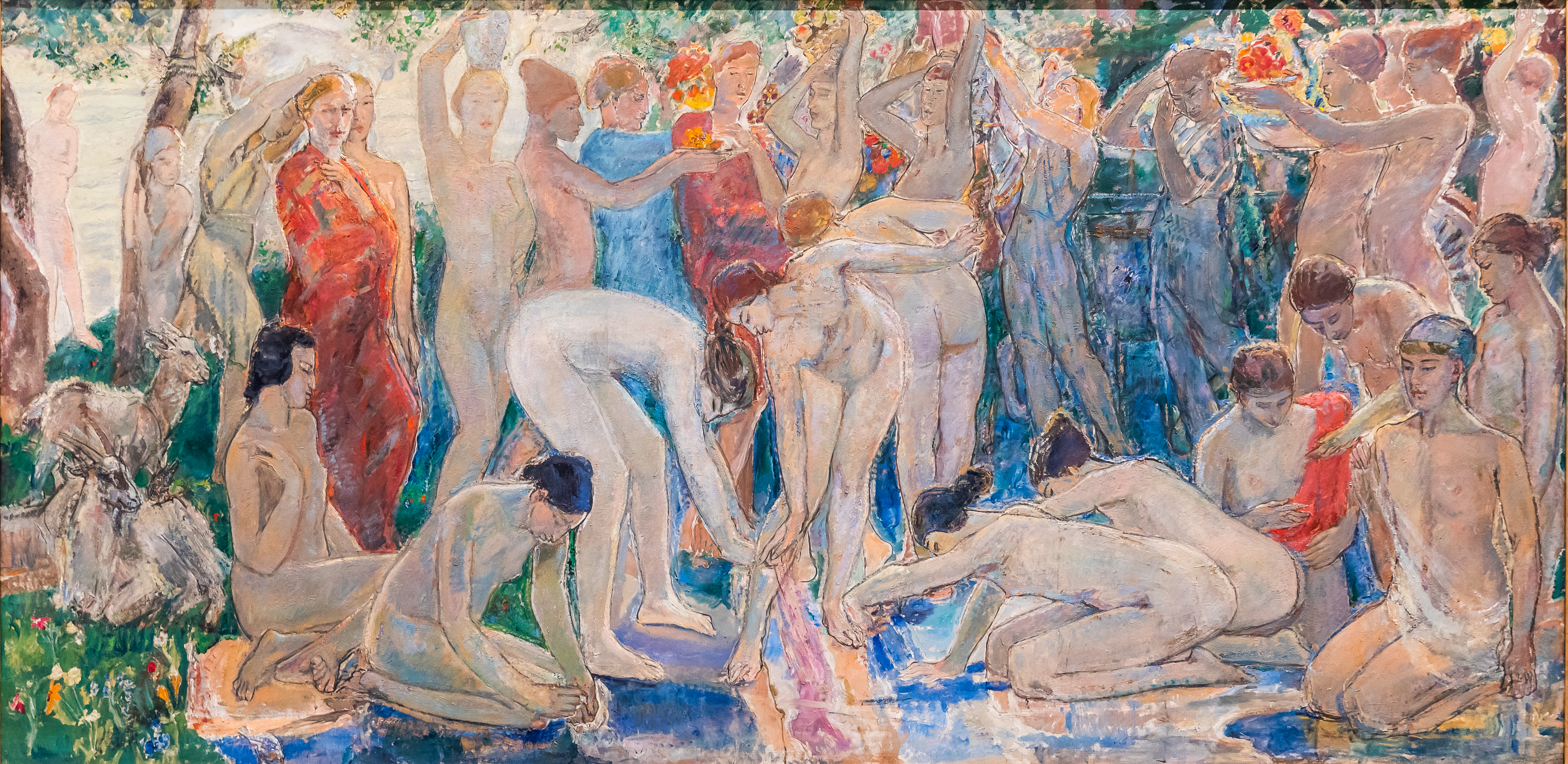
Decoration: The Excursion of Nausicaa

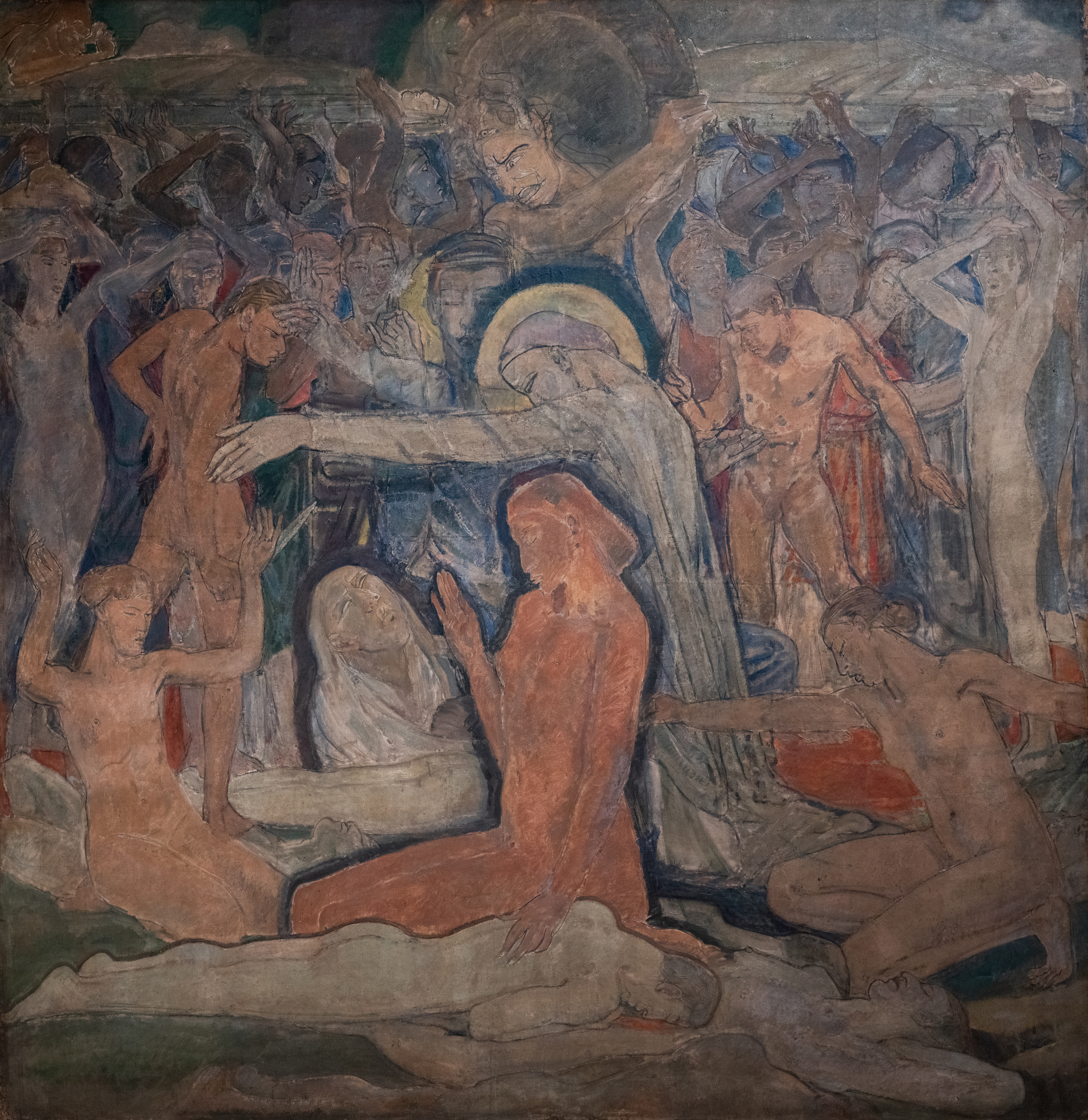
Decoration: The Zone of Hate
