= Old Place Manor =

Listed building in West Sussex, England

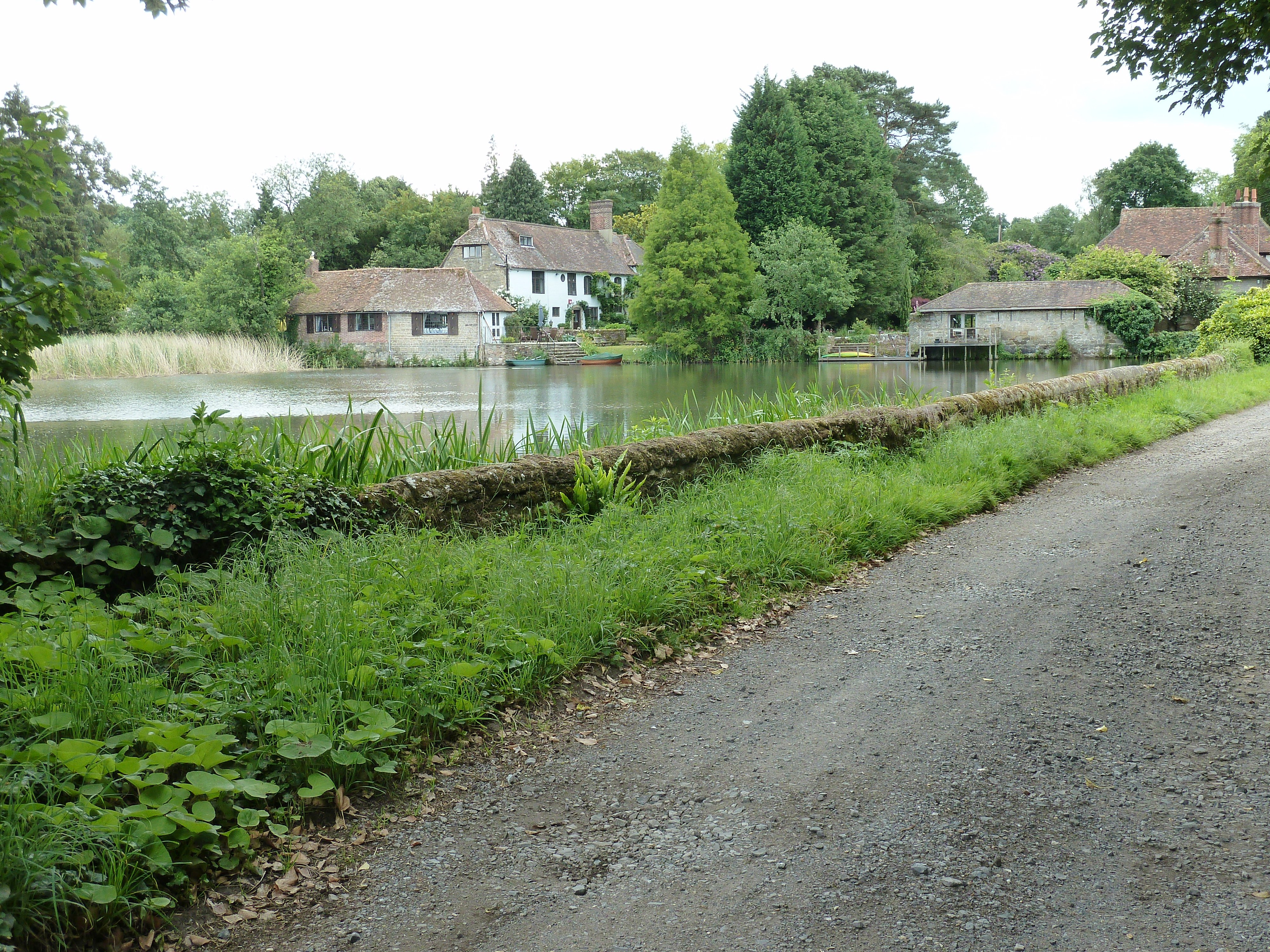
- Old Place Manor is the house to the left

- Location within West Sussex

General information
- Location: Coombelands Lane, Pulborough, West Sussex, England
- Coordinates: 50.960560°N 0.511902°W

Listed Building – Grade II
- Official name: Old Place Manor
- Designated: 15 March 1955
- Reference no.: 1027373

Old Place Manor is a Grade II listed building on Coombelands Lane, in Pulborough, West Sussex, England.

The oldest parts of the house date from the 15th century, with a 16th-century roof on the northern side. There are some medieval features inside.
