= Clara Christian (artist) =

British artist

- Born: Clara Louise Christian; 27 September 1868; Chelsea, London, England
- Died: 7 June 1906 (aged 37); Dublin, Ireland

Clara Louise McCarthy (née Christian; 27 September 1868 – 7 June 1906) was an English painter of still life, interiors and landscapes.

Clara Louise Christian was born in Chelsea, London in 1868. She trained at the Slade School of Fine Arts. For a time, she lived with fellow artist, Ethel Walker. Having become a friend of George Moore, she moved to Dublin in 1901, and in 1905 married the Dublin city architect, Charles McCarthy. She died in 1906.
