= St Mary's Church, Pulborough =

The Parish Church of St Mary
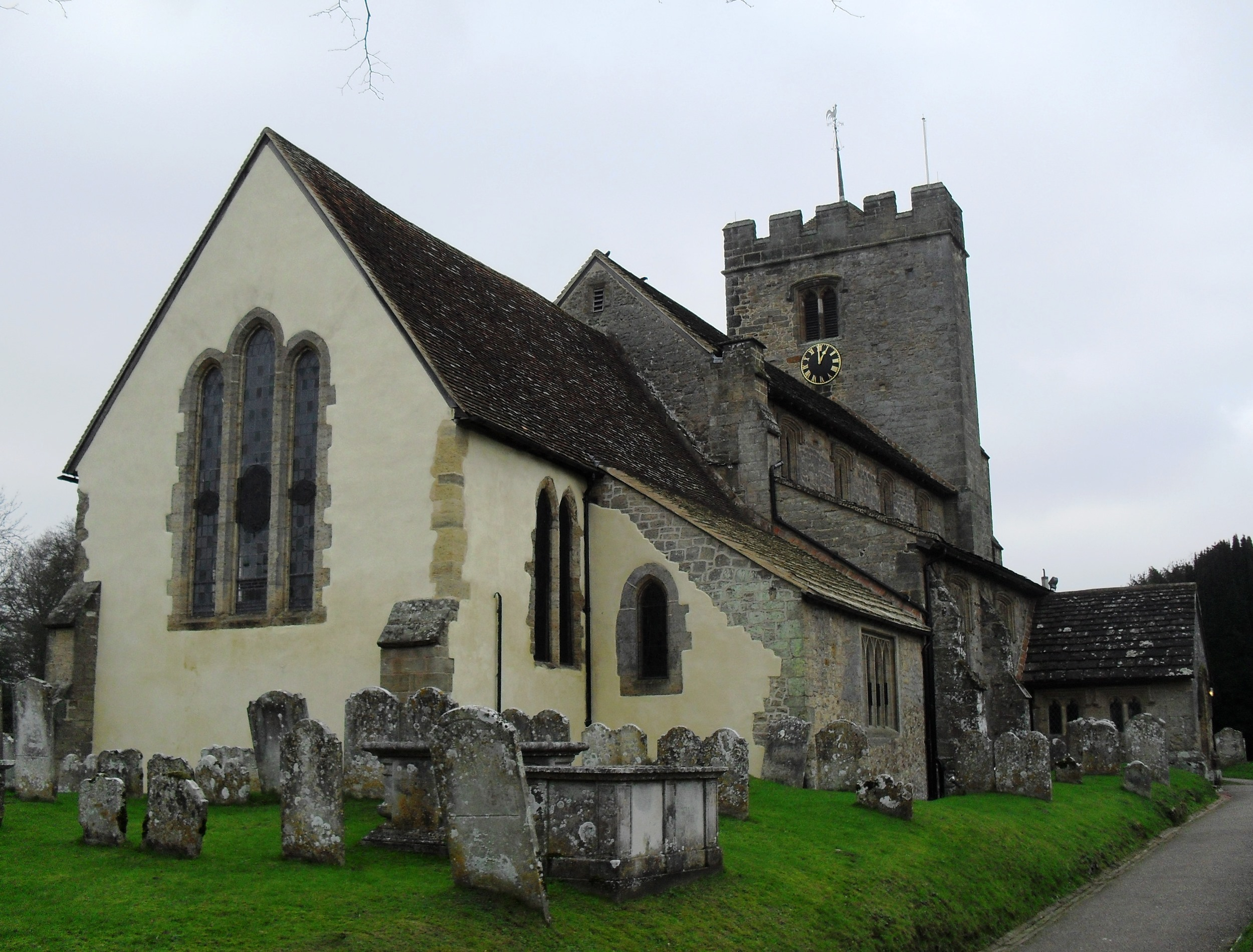
- The Parish Church of St Mary
- The Parish Church of St Mary
- 50.958598°N 0.510162°W
- Address: Church Place, Pulborough, West Sussex, RH20
- Country: England
- Denomination: Church of England
- Website: http://www.stmaryspulborough.org.uk/

St Mary's Church, Pulborough
- Interactive map of the St Mary's Church, Pulborough area

St. Mary's Church, Pulborough, also known as The Parish Church of St Mary, is a Grade I listed building in Pulborough, West Sussex.

The chancel dates from the 13th or 14th centuries and the nave and tower from the 15th.
