= Mid-Sussex railways =

Former railway group

The Mid-Sussex railways were a group of English railway companies that together formed what became the Mid-Sussex line, from Three Bridges through Horsham to Littlehampton, in southern England. After 1938 the Southern Railway operated a regular electric train service ran from London to Bognor Regis and Portsmouth using the marketing brand "Mid-Sussex Line", leading to an informal consensus. The Mid-Sussex Railway Company ran from Horsham to Petworth, and the Mid-Sussex Junction line of the London, Brighton and South Coast Railway (LBSCR) extended from the Petworth line to Littlehampton. The Three Bridges to Horsham branch of the LBSCR was at first the sole access from the north to the Mid-Sussex railways, although a line from Leatherhead was used later.

The through route was opened in a series of stages with only a vague strategic objective, but in the last quarter of the nineteenth century it became the shortest route of the LBSCR to south coast locations between Littlehampton and Portsmouth. The through route opened in 1867, and electrification was completed in 1938.

The route continues in use as a main line, with passenger train operation using the brand name Arun Valley line south of Horsham. The final part of the line to Petworth has been closed.

== History ==
=== Horsham branch line from Three Bridges ===
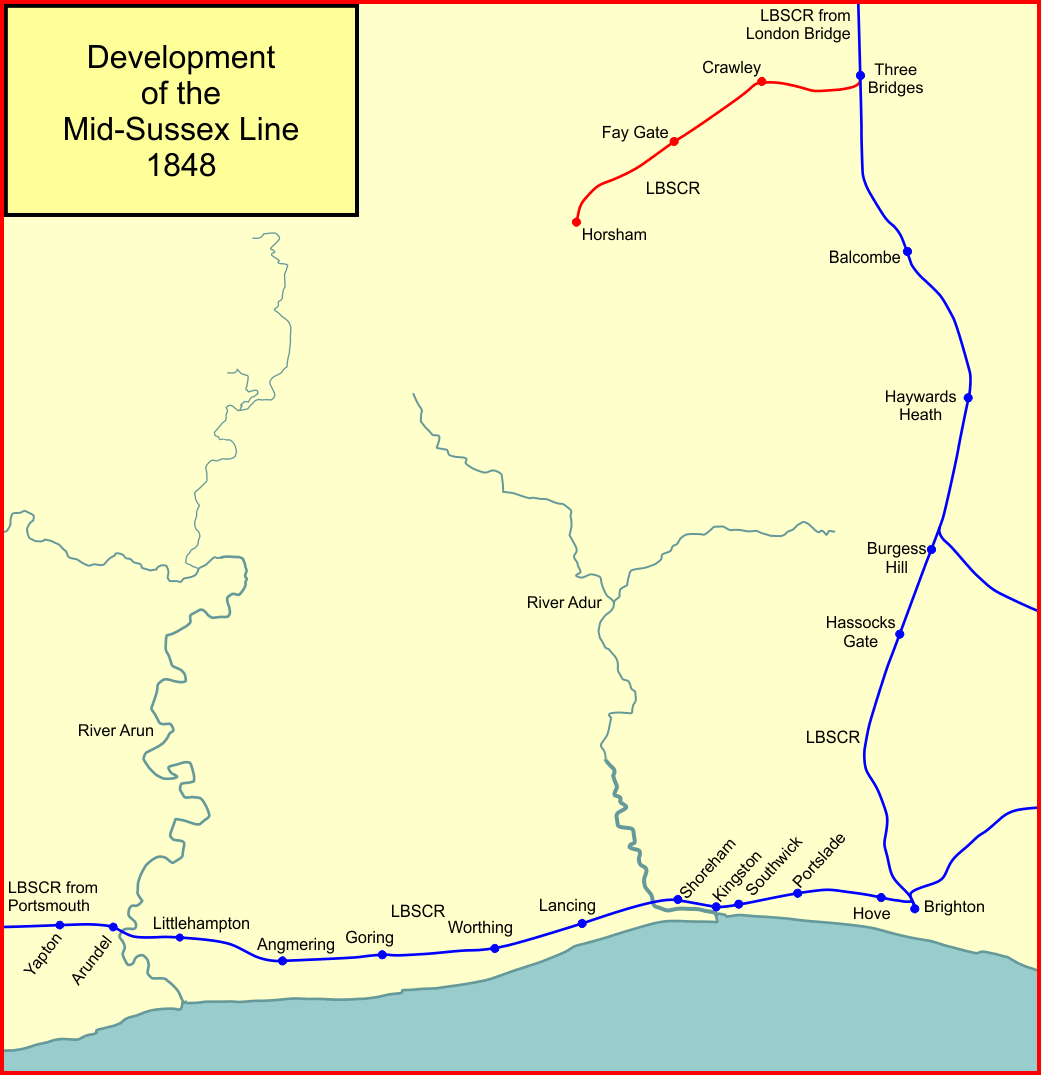
System map of Three Bridges to Horsham branch in 1848

The successful opening and operation of the Liverpool and Manchester Railway inspired promoters in other parts of the country to consider what lines might be built. A railway from London to Brighton was considered to be an early possibility, but the topography of the North Downs and the South Downs made the selection of a route contentious. The London and Brighton Railway eventually was authorised to make a direct line through Three Bridges, and it opened in 1841. Its trains used the London and Croydon Railway at the north end of the route.

One of the routes that had been put forward would have run by way of Horsham, which was an important market town. Horsham was disappointed to have been left off the emerging railway network, and the London and Brighton Railway designed a route connecting Three Bridges to Horsham, a distance of about 8 1/2 miles. This was authorised on 21 July 1845.

The London and Brighton Railway merged with the London and Croydon Railway and others by an act of Parliament, the London and Brighton Railway Act 1846 (9 & 10 Vict. c. cclxxxii), of 27 July 1846. The new combined company was called the London Brighton and South Coast Railway. The LBSCR continued the construction of the Horsham branch, and it opened to traffic on 14 February 1848.

=== Indirect routes to Portsmouth ===
As the work proceeded it had become evident that a railway from London to Portsmouth was desirable. At the time the LBSCR considered that the way to achieve that was to extend westward from Chichester, where it already had a branch line from Brighton, in collaboration with an affiliated company, the Brighton and Chichester Railway. London – Brighton – Chichester – Portsmouth was a very indirect route. The London and South Western Railway (LSWR) was at Guildford, and was considering an approach to Portsmouth by building south from there to Chichester and then westward along the coast. At over 95 miles this too would have been a circuitous way to get from London to Portsmouth.

Already on 8 August 1845 the Railway from Portsmouth to Chichester Act 1845 (8 & 9 Vict. c. cxcix) had been passed regarding a joint entry into Portsmouth, with the LBSCR and the LSWR as partners. The LBSCR would extend from Chichester and the LSWR would make the Fareham to Portsmouth connection. Both of these routes to Portsmouth were rather roundabout, and for the time being a direct route to Portsmouth was in abeyance; it was not until 1859 that the Portsmouth Direct Line opened.

=== On from Horsham to Petworth ===
Mid Sussex Railway Act 1857
- Act of Parliament
- Parliament of the United Kingdom
- Long title: An Act for making a Railway from the London, Brighton, and South Coast Railway at Horsham, through Billingshurst, to Pulborough, with a Branch from Pulborough to Coultershaw Mill in the Parish of Petworth, all in the County of Sussex.
- Citation: 20 & 21 Vict. c. cxxxiii

Dates
- Royal assent: 10 August 1857

Text of statute as originally enacted

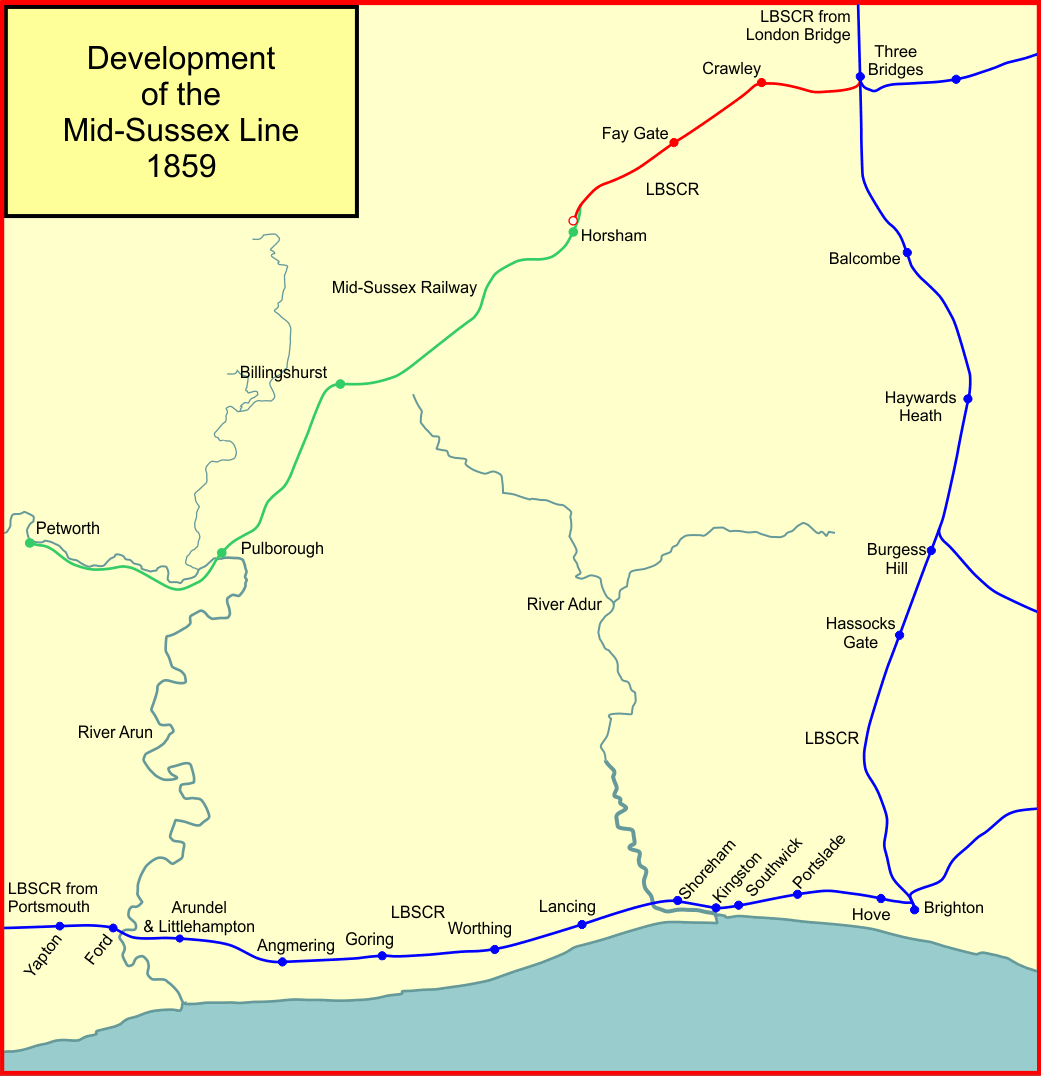
System map of the Horsham to Petworth railway in 1860

There was a large area between the Brighton main line and the Portsmouth Direct line unoccupied by any railway, in the middle of the nineteenth century. The area was agricultural with no large towns in it, but nevertheless it was desired to occupy it with a railway. A local concern, the Mid-Sussex Railway was projected: it would build a line on from Horsham to Billingshurst, Pulborough and Petworth. The Mid-Sussex Railway Company received its authorising act of Parliament, the Mid Sussex Railway Act 1857 (20 & 21 Vict. c. cxxxiii) on 10 August 1857.

The line was to be single track, and 17 1/2 miles long; it was originally proposed by the Mid-Sussex company that Petworth should be reached by a more direct route rather than through Pulborough, but Pulborough was considered too important to leave off the line of route. By aligning the route to the south to reach Pulborough, the onward course to Petworth was kept south of the River Rother, to minimise cost of river crossings. The Petworth terminus was some way from the town, at a location known as Coultershaw Mill.

Horsham station had been built as a terminus from Three Bridges and was not suitable for simply being altered to a through station, and a new station had to be built. The line to Petworth opened on 10 October 1859; it was a single track. It was leased to the LBSCR from the outset, and the larger company operated it. The Mid-Sussex Railway Company was absorbed by the LBSCR by the London, Brighton and South Coast Railway (Additional Powers) Act 1864 (27 & 28 Vict. c. cccxiv) of 29 July 1864.

The population of Petworth in 1851 was 2,439 and of Midhurst 1,481. A separate company, the Mid-Sussex and Midhurst Railway, received authority to continue the line to Midhurst under the Mid Sussex and Midhurst Junction Railway Act 1859 (22 & 23 Vict. c. cxxv) of 13 August 1859. It was originally the intention of the Mid-Sussex and Midhurst Railway to seek to extend its line to Petersfield, but the LBSCR would not support such an extension, as being contrary to a territorial exclusivity agreement with the LSWR. There was some delay due to the difficulty in raising capital, but the line to Midhurst opened on 15 October 1866. The company was acquired by the LBSCR by the London, Brighton and South Coast Railway (Capital and Powers) Act 1866 (29 & 30 Vict. c. cclxxxi) of 30 July 1866, but this only took effect in June 1874.

=== Branch to Shoreham and Brighton ===
In 1861 a branch line from Itchingfield Junction, south of Horsham, to Shoreham was opened; it largely followed the valley of the River Adur. At the time Shoreham was considered an important harbour for cross-Channel cargo, and the connection to Brighton was a useful cross-country connection.

=== Continuing to the coast ===
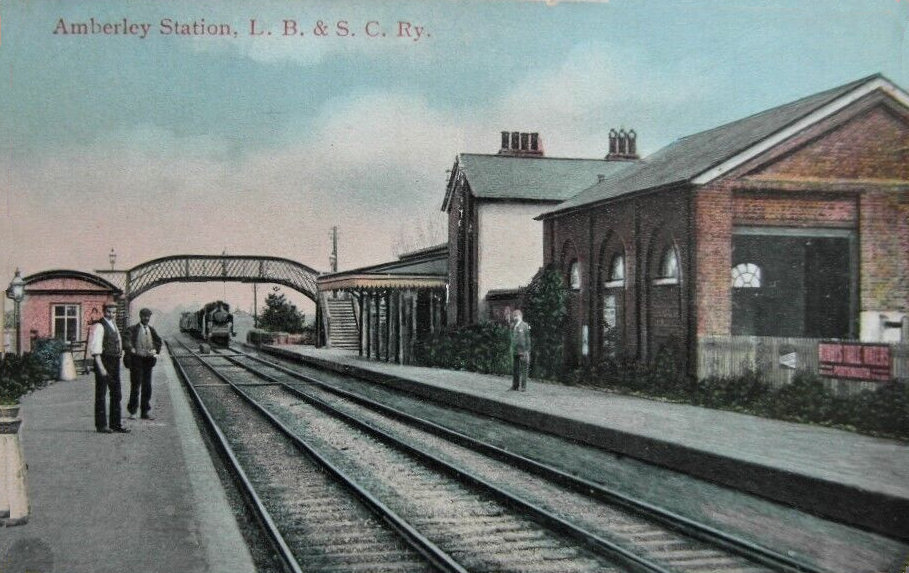
Amberley railway station about 1910

At this stage the LBSCR decided to double the track on the River Arun bridge at Ford (at the time called Arundel station), as this was the only remaining single track section on the coast line from Brighton to Portsmouth. As part of the work they hoped to reduce the span to save cost. At first this was objected to by the River Arun Navigation Commissioners, but they relented on condition that the LBSCR build a railway from Littlehampton, where there were to be quayside sidings, to Pulborough. So far as the commissioners were concerned this was a considerable improvement to be paid for by the railway.

The LBSCR were not displeased to be obliged to make this railway, as they had already been thinking of doing so and had expected opposition. The work was authorised by the London, Brighton and South Coast Railway Act 1860 (23 & 24 Vict. c. clxxi) on 23 July 1860; the new line would be about ten miles long from Hardham Junction just south of Pulborough to the Ford station, and it would save ten miles on the journey from London to Chichester and Portsmouth. The new line was described as the Mid-Sussex Junction Railway. A branch line from Ford to Littlehampton was also authorised under the London, Brighton and South Coast Railway Act 1860.

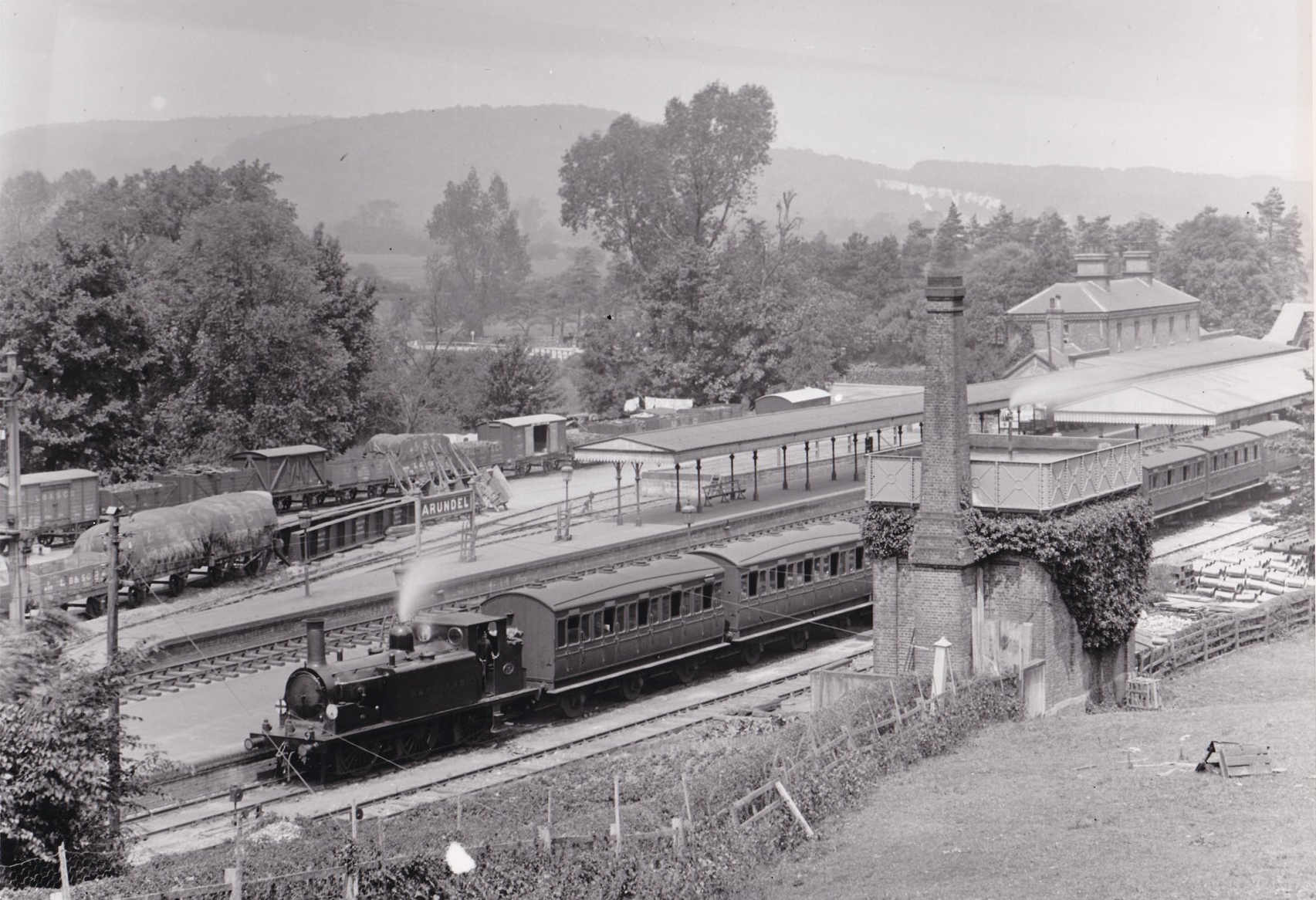
View of Arundel station with a train waiting in the loop.

As part of the work, the original Mid-Sussex Railway section from Horsham to Hardham Junction was doubled. The 9 1/2 miles of new line from Hardham Junction to Arundel Junction was opened on 3 August 1863. At first this was limited to three trains a day between Ford and Pulborough, due to the reservations of the Board of Trade inspecting officer, Col. Yolland, about the security of the track. where the trains made connection with the Petworth to London trains.

=== Littlehampton ===
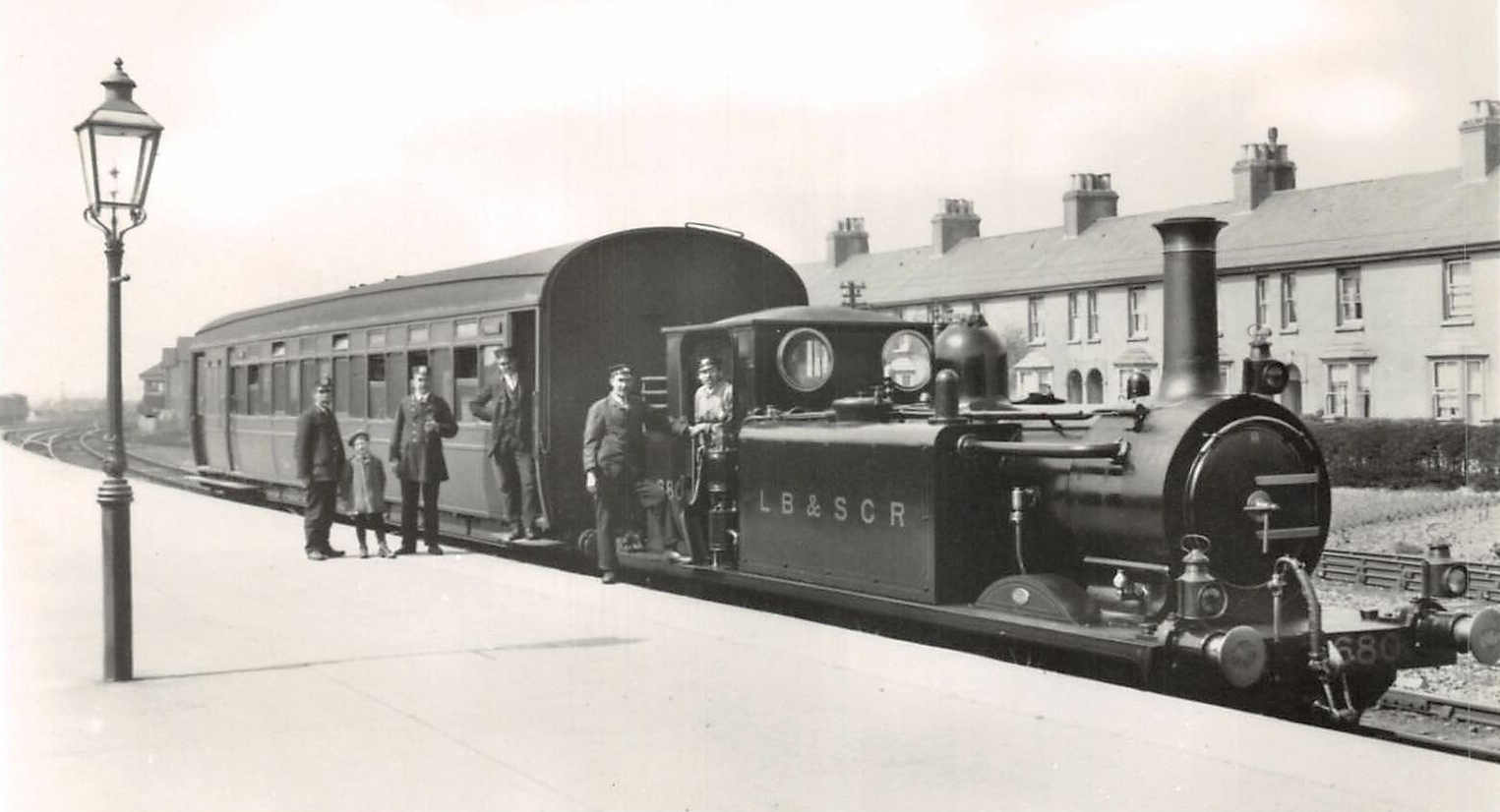
Littlehampton railway station with a motor train at the platform

The Littlehampton branch of 1 mile 57 chains was authorised as part of the London, Brighton and South Coast Railway Act 1860 (23 & 24 Vict. c. clxxi); it was part of the River Arun Commissioners’ requirement. It was simple enough to construct, and it joined the LBSCR West Coast line at Ford; the junction was named Arundel Junction, and was the point of convergence for the Pulborough line as well as the Littlehampton branch. Soon after it was renamed Ford Junction. The Littlehampton branch opened on 17 August 1863.

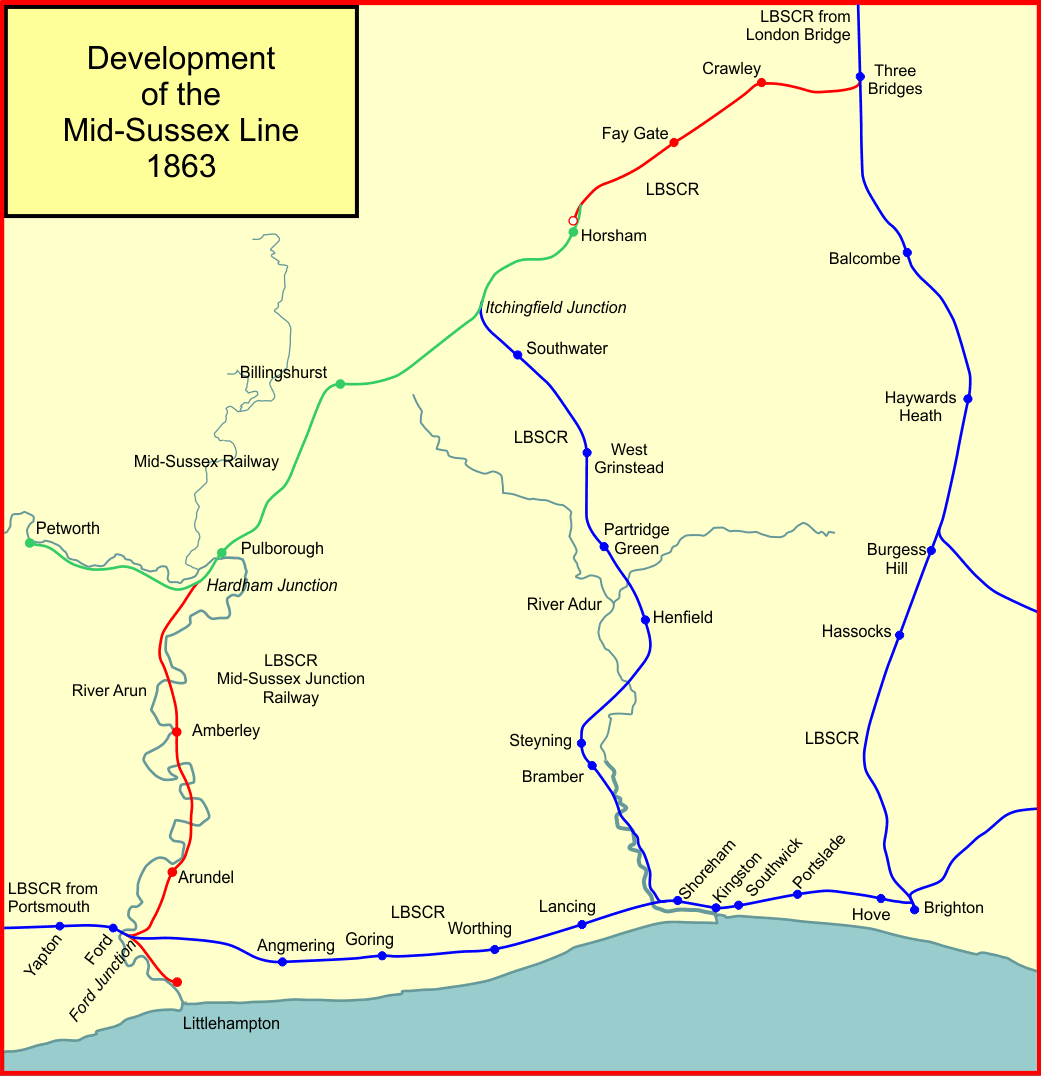
System map of the Pulborough to Littlehampton line in 1863

Both lines faced Portsmouth, so that direct through running from Littlehampton to Arundel was not possible, even though that must have been the commissioners’ expectation. A spur was authorised by the London, Brighton and South Coast Railway (Additional Powers) Act 1864 (27 & 28 Vict. c. cccxiv) of 29 July 1864; this would run directly from the Littlehampton line towards Pulborough, but it was not constructed and the powers were allowed to lapse.

A more comprehensive scheme was prepared, and this was authorised by the London, Brighton and South Coast Railway (Capital and Powers) Act 1866 (29 & 30 Vict. c. cclxxxi) of 30 July 1866. It would have provided two new spurs to enable direct running from Littlehampton towards Pulborough or Worthing. Parliament imposed a penalty of £50 per day if the new spurs were not constructed within a specified time. However the Pulborough-facing spur would have crossed the West Coast line by a flat crossing, and the Board of Trade objected to the arrangement; consequently neither spur was constructed, and later on the Brighton company had to start paying the £50 per day penalty for non-compliance with their own act of Parliament.

=== Horsham and Guildford Direct Railway ===
In 1865 the Horsham and Guildford Direct Railway was opened. It ran from Stammerham Junction south of Horsham to Shalford Junction, south of Guildford. The junction at Stammerham was arranged to permit through running from Shoreham to Guilford, and the promoters had conceived that heavy through goods traffic from the Midlands to Brighton would result. The LSWR were in possession of the railways at Guildford, although the South Eastern Railway (SER) had a line there from Reading. From the LSWR point of view, the objective appeared obvious: the Great Western Railway, the SER and the LBSCR would collude in developing a network in Hampshire and West Sussex that would abstract LSWR business, and the latter did all in its power to obstruct the through traffic. It was largely successful: the traffic never developed and the southern spur at Stammerham was removed; the Horsham to Guildford line remained a simple rural branch line.

The LSWR were antagonistic to the Horsham line, which they feared would attract incursion by the Great Western Railway over the SER line.

=== Leatherhead to Horsham ===
Horsham was connected to the railway network by way of Three Bridges, on the Brighton main line, but the junction there did not permit through running, so that Horsham trains required to backshunt to reach Horsham. A more direct route from London to Horsham was under consideration, running from Leatherhead through Dorking. The intervening terrain was not densely occupied, the only significant town being Dorking itself, already served by an east–west line operated by the South Eastern Railway.

On 1 February 1859 the Epsom and Leatherhead Railway had opened to Leatherhead. The Epsom and Leatherhead Railway was now operated jointly with the LSWR. A short extension at Leatherhead to a new independent station was opened by the LBSCR on 4 March 1867. The LBSCR decided to build the line from Leatherhead to Dorking, and got powers to do so by the London, Brighton, and South Coast Railway (Dorking to Leatherhead) Act 1863 (26 & 27 Vict. c. cxxxvii) of 13 July 1863.

An independent Horsham, Dorking and Leatherhead Railway (HD&LR) had obtained powers on 17 July 1862 to build from Horsham northwards to Dorking, and now the LBSCR acquired the HD&LR by the London, Brighton and South Coast Railway (Additional Powers) Act 1864 (27 & 28 Vict. c. cccxiv) of 29 July 1864, so that in total powers had been secured for the entire through route. The line from Leatherhead to Dorking was opened on 11 March 1867.

=== Arundel Junction ===
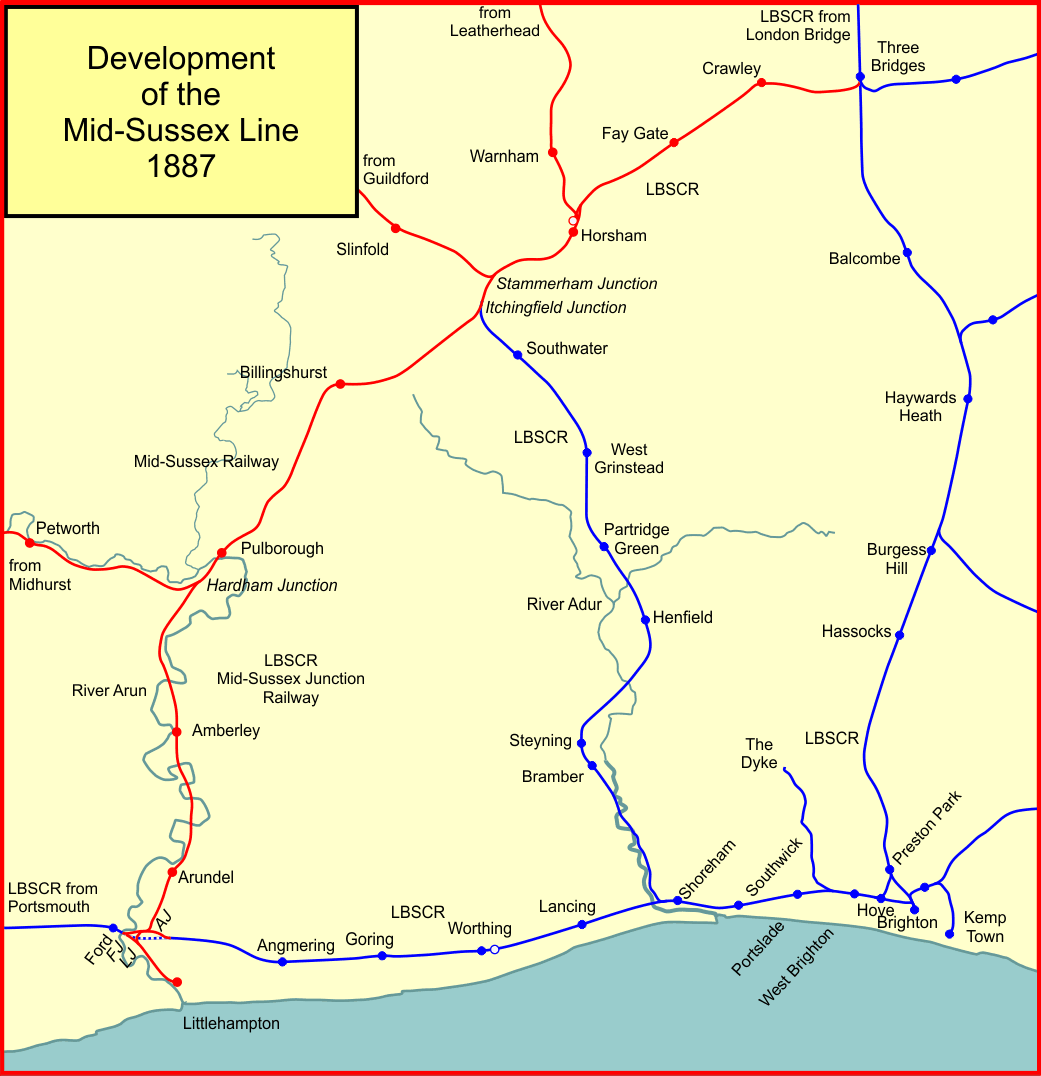
System map of the Mid-Sussex line in 1887: Arundel junction is finally resolved

The Littlehampton branch had been opened in 1863 with a simple junction at Ford, with direct running only toward Chichester. Two unsuccessful attempts had been made to improve the junction configuration, and the LBSCR was paying a £50 daily penalty for failure to construct the authorised connecting lines.

The London, Brighton, and South Coast Railway (Various Powers) Act 1876 (39 & 40 Vict. c. cxliv) authorising entirely new lines to eliminate the continuing need for reversal at Ford, was obtained on 13 July 1876, and removed the penalty for not building the spurs. It provided for a realignment of the West Coast line enabling a full triangular junction to be provided for the Littlehampton branch, and for the Pulborough line to diverge at the eastern apex.

The company was to have five years to build these two railways with a £50 per day penalty for non completion. Once again there were delays, and it was not until 28 September 1885 that the realignment of the West Coast line was brought into use. Although the original route there was abandoned, the telegraph lines remained in place for several years. The commissioning of the south-to-east curve took place on 1 January 1887.

=== Electrification to Dorking ===
The Southern Railway (SR) was formed in 1923 by the forced amalgamation of the LBSCR, the LSWR and other railways, in a process known as the Grouping, following the Railways Act 1921. The LSWR had implemented a widespread network of third-rail DC electrification in the suburban area, and this was considered to be highly satisfactory. The Southern Railway determined to extend the system. The SR implemented a widespread scheme of electrification of outer suburban routes using the system. This included the line from Epsom to Leatherhead; public operation to Leatherhead started on 12 July 1925, although there was a formal opening ceremony on 9 July, when a special train of the new electric stock was received by civic dignitaries at Dorking. The new trains ran to a regular-interval pattern, and two trains per hour ran to Dorking. There were still two separate stations at Leatherhead, a legacy of the prior competition between the LSWR and the LBSCR. From 10 July 1927 the two stations at Leatherhead were re-arranged so that all trains used the former LBSCR station.

=== Electrification on to Arundel Junction ===
The electrification of the Mid-Sussex line and associated connections was the second scheme to be financed under the 1935 arrangement with the Treasury. It was known as the Portsmouth No. 2 Scheme, as it followed the No. 1 scheme, which was on the Portsmouth Direct Line and associated routes. The No. 2 scheme comprised the route from Dorking to Horsham and onwards through Arundel to the coastal junction at Ford, and the connecting line from Three Bridges to Horsham, as well as the coastal route from West Worthing to Havant and the Littlehampton and Bognor Regis branches. The newly converted lines made end-on connections with existing electrified routes at Dorking (1925 suburban extension), Three Bridges and West Worthing (1932/33 Brighton scheme) and Havant (1937 Portsmouth No. 1 scheme).

The cost of the work was estimated to be £2.75 million, to electrify 75 route miles, 165 single track miles. The scheme was authorised by the SR board in July 1936, and work started in mid-1937, as soon as the teams responsible were available following the completion of the Direct Line electrification. The rolling stock was the responsibility of Oliver Bulleid.

The Down bay platform at Dorking North was converted into a loop and resignalled for running in either direction. Colour-light signalling was installed from Mickleham through to Holmwood controlled from a signalbox at Dorking. Intermediate signal boxes, such as that at Lodge Farm north of Holmwood, ceased to be block-posts. Horsham station was completely rebuilt, and all remnants of the 1859 LBSCR structure were swept away. A loop was inserted at the back of the Up platform, as a continuation of the Up bay formerly used by the railmotor service to Three Bridges. A new signalbox with a 90-lever frame was built near to the site of the former Horsham Junction box; this replaced three boxes. The new island platforms were 820 feet long. The platforms at Pulborough, Arundel and Littlehampton were all extended to 820 feet. At the latter, a new bay platform, 540 feet long, was constructed as well as a carriage shed to house three 12-car multiple unit trains; the old station buildings were demolished and temporary accommodation provided, but this became permanent. A new signalbox was provided at Arundel.

Work had progressed sufficiently for the first trial trains to run over the newly electrified lines in May 1938, and in the following month electric stock was used on a number of specials between London Bridge and Bognor Regis. The official opening took place on 30 June 1938, with the usual civic receptions which had become a feature of SR electrification inaugurations. Regular electric services on the sections newly converted commenced on 2 July 1938.

The Pullman car services provided in steam trains to Bognor Regis were discontinued, and catering in new buffet cars provided was in the hands of the Pullman Car Company.

The number of trains from Horsham to London rose from 49 to 72 a day; Bognor services doubled and Portsmouth services increased by 50 per cent. The new service was based on hourly fast trains from London Victoria which ran to Portsmouth and Bognor Regis stopping at Sutton, Dorking North, Horsham, Pulborough, Arundel and Barnham, where the train divided. A connecting train was provided at Arundel for Littlehampton.

In addition to the hourly trains via Sutton and Dorking, three of the fast trains daily ran via Redhill and Three Bridges, but made the same stops south of Horsham. The fastest train was the 17:18 Victoria to Bognor, which took only 87 minutes, running fast as far as Horsham and Arundel. Trains from Waterloo previously terminating at Dorking North were extended to Horsham. In the first six months of the new electric service receipts rose 13%.

One suburban train each hour from Waterloo to Dorking North via Wimbledon and one train from London Bridge to Dorking North via Mitcham Junction were extended to Horsham, calling at all stations. Additionally, one other Waterloo train was extended as far as Holmwood.

=== Closure of the Petworth branch ===
The Petworth branch remained a rural backwater, and it was closed to passenger trains on 5 February 1955. The branch was completely closed on 20 May 1966.

== Current operations ==
The Mid-Sussex line remains an important secondary main line, with regular interval services from London; the fast trains now run via Gatwick Airport. The current (December 2022) timetable gives an hourly stopping train from Victoria to Horsham over the Dorking route, with an additional train from Victoria to Dorking and another from Waterloo to Dorking. The former pattern of Bognor Regis and Portsmouth Harbour portions running together and dividing at Barnham has been changed; they now divide at Horsham, and a Portsmouth or Southampton portion runs fast from there to Barnham. These trains run generally every 30 minutes. Between Three Bridges and Horsham this service is augmented by a 30-minute frequency of Thameslink trains running to Horsham from Peterborough.

== Stations ==
=== Main line ===
- Three Bridges; opened 12 July 1841 on London and Brighton Railway main line; still open;
- Crawley; opened 14 February 1848; still open;
- Ifield; opened 1 June 1907 as Lyons Crossing Halt; renamed Ifield Halt 6 July 1907; closed 1 January 1917; reopened 3 May 1920; Halt omitted 6 July 1930; still open;
- Littlehaven; opened 1 June 1907 as Rusper Road Crossing; renamed Littlehaven Crossing July 1907; renamed Littlehaven December 1907; closed 1 January 1917; reopened 3 May 1920;

still open;

- Faygate; opened 14 February 1848 as Fay Gate; altered to Faygate 5 December 1953; still open;
- Horsham; opened 14 February 1848; relocated when Mid-Sussex line southwards opened on 10 October 1859; still open.
- Christs Hospital; opened 1 May 1902 as Christ's Hospital West Horsham; renamed 1968/72; still open;
- Stammerham Junction; divergence of Guildford line;
- Itchingfield Junction; divergence of Steyning line;
- Billingshurst; opened 10 October 1859; still open;
- Pulborough; opened 10 October 1859; still open;
- Hardham Junction;
- Stammerham Junction;
- Amberley; opened 3 August 1863; still open;
- Arundel; opened 3 August 1863; still open;
- Arundel Junction;
- Ford; opened 8 June 1846 as Arundel; renamed Ford for Arundel 1850: renamed Ford Junction 1863; renamed Ford Sussex 9 July 1923; still open.

=== Petworth line ===
- Hardham Junction; above;
- Fittleworth; opened 2 September 1889; closed 7 February 1955;
- Petworth; opened 10 October 1859; closed 7 February 1955.

=== Littlehampton ===
- Littlehampton; opened 17 August 1863; still open.
