= Midhurst Railways =

The Midhurst Railways were three branch lines which were built to serve the market town of Midhurst in the English county of West Sussex. The three lines were the Petersfield Railway, from Petersfield; the Mid-Sussex Railway extended by the Mid-Sussex and Midhurst Junction Railway, from Hardham Junction (Pulborough); and from Chichester. The Petersfield Railway opened in 1864, the promoting company having been absorbed by the London and South Western Railway (LSWR) in 1863. The Mid-Sussex lines reached Midhurst in 1866, after being absorbed by the London, Brighton and South Coast Railway (LBSCR) in 1862. The two lines did not connect, and there were two separate stations close by one another. The Chichester line took much longer to complete, and was opened in 1881, and a new LBSCR station was opened, replacing the first station. In 1925 the former LSWR line was connected to that station.

The lines were never busy and the area remained rural; the Chichester line was closed to passenger trains in 1935. A culvert on that line was washed out in 1951 causing a goods train to fall into the cavity. The line was severed and never reopened past that point. Passenger services were withdrawn on the Petersfield – Midhurst – Pulborough axis in 1955, and goods traffic ended in 1966.

The Chichester to Lavant line continued with a very sporadic goods service, and that ended in 1968. Gravel extraction at Lavant revived the southern part of the line in 1971, and that continued until 1991. The lines now have no railway activity.

== History ==
=== Early proposals ===
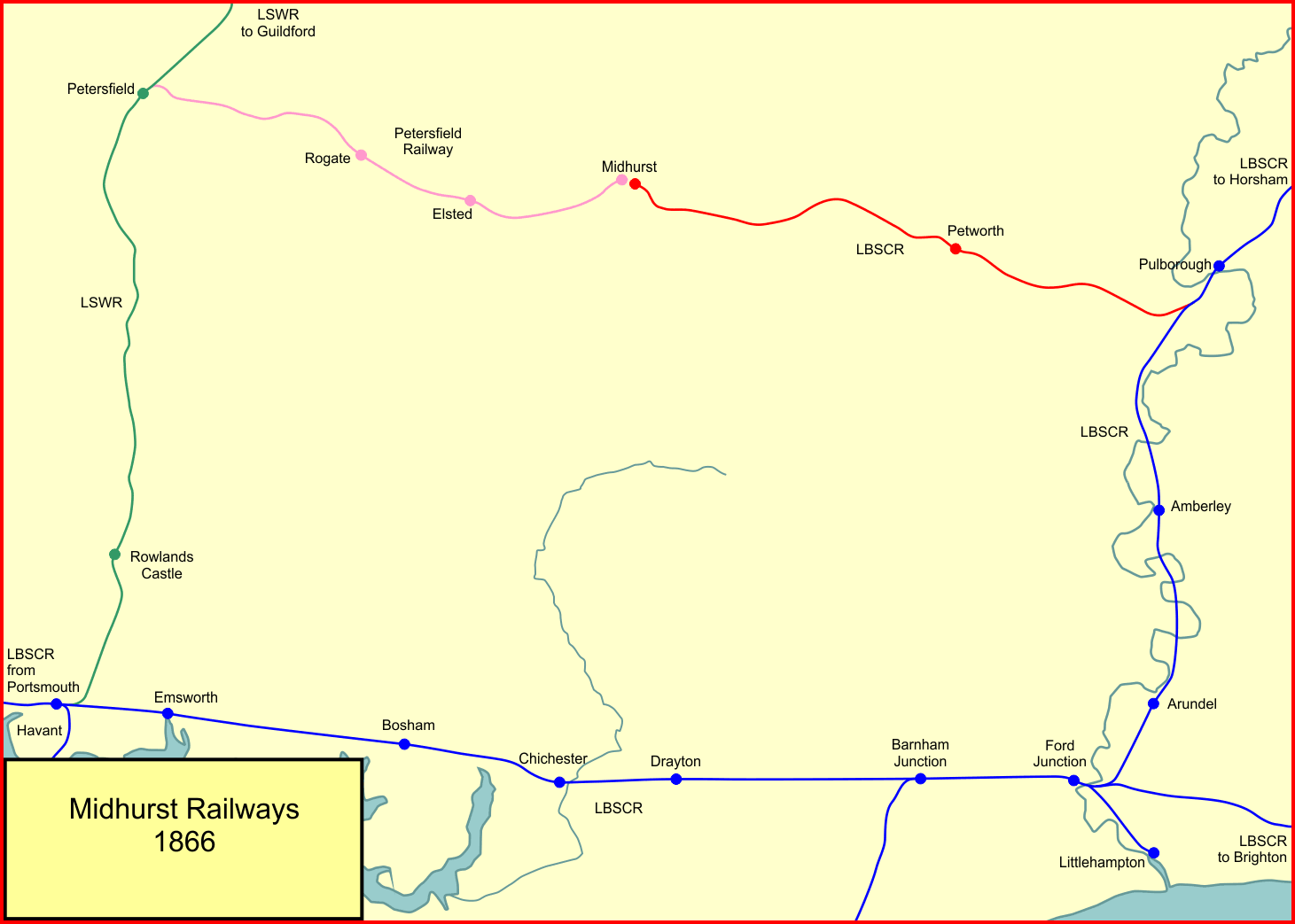
Midhurst railways in 1866

In the 1850s it was felt urgently necessary to connect Portsmouth with London, and a considerable number of schemes were put forward. One would have aligned such a route from Godalming through Midhurst and Chichester, and from there along the coast, but in fact other, more roundabout routes were preferred. Although never built, the line had an enduring significance as it marked the boundary between the agreed territory of the LBSCR and the LSWR: the two companies agreed not to encroach on the other's area of influence.

The tract of land south-west of Horsham was largely agricultural, with no large settlements. The population of Petworth in 1851 was 2,439 and Midhurst had 1,481 inhabitants. Although never on a main line Midhurst attracted the attention of railway builders, and three railway routes approached the town.

They connected into the growing railway network of southern England. The London, Brighton and South Coast Railway had its West Coast line running from Brighton to Chichester, actually opened by the Brighton and Chichester Railway, in 1846. This was extended to Portsmouth in 1847. To the north-west ran the Portsmouth Direct line, operated by the London and South Western Railway. To the north lay Horsham station, terminus of a branch from Three Bridges on the London to Brighton main line of the LBSCR.

=== The Petersfield Railway ===
Petersfield Railway Act 1860
- Act of Parliament
- Parliament of the United Kingdom
- Long title: An Act for making a Railway from the Mid-Sussex and Midhurst Junction Railway to Petersfield in the County of Southampton.
- Citation: 23 & 24 Vict. c. clxxiii

Dates
- Royal assent: 23 July 1860

Text of statute as originally enacted

Petersfield Railway Deviation Act 1861
- Act of Parliament
- Parliament of the United Kingdom
- Long title: An Act to extend and deviate a Portion of the Petersfield Railway.
- Citation: 24 & 25 Vict. c. ccxxiv

Dates
- Royal assent: 1 August 1861

The Mid-Sussex and Midhurst Junction Railway had considered extending from Midhurst to Petersfield, on the Portsmouth line, controlled by the London and South Western Railway, but were deterred from doing so by the territorial exclusivity agreement between the LBSCR and the LSWR, Midhurst being considered to be the boundary. The connection was seen to be desirable, so a company was projected to make the line: it was to be called the Petersfield Railway, and its estimated cost was £90,000.

A bill was presented to Parliament for the Petersfield Railway; it would run from a junction with the Mid-Sussex and Midhurst Railway at Midhurst to a junction with the Portsmouth line immediately north of Petersfield station. During the consideration of the bill in Parliament, there was a significant difference of views between, the Petersfield Railway and the MS&MR, and the Mid-Sussex company managed to have a clause inserted into the bill to specifically preclude a junction with its line. On that basis the Petersfield Railway got its authorising act of Parliament, the Petersfield Railway Act 1860 (23 & 24 Vict. c. clxxiii) on 23 July 1860. It was independent of the LSWR, and the line was to be 9 1/2 miles in length.

A shareholders' meeting at the time of authorisation was told that an extension of the line to Southampton, connecting and running over the Bishops Waltham branch, would be possible. This was taken as an attractive idea, although the extension at 23 1/2 miles would be more than double the length of the authorised line; it would cost £260,000. The idea went to Parliament in 1861 but was rejected there, on the basis of opposition from the LSWR. An appeal to reconsider was later made to the LSWR board, but they declined to consider supporting the line.

In September 1861 negotiations took place with the LSWR over absorption, and it was agreed that the Petersfield Railway would be sold to the LSWR for £110,000 in cash. This arrangement was made effective on 1 January 1863, and was authorised by the South Western Railway Act 1863 (26 & 27 Vict. c. xc) of 22 June 1863.

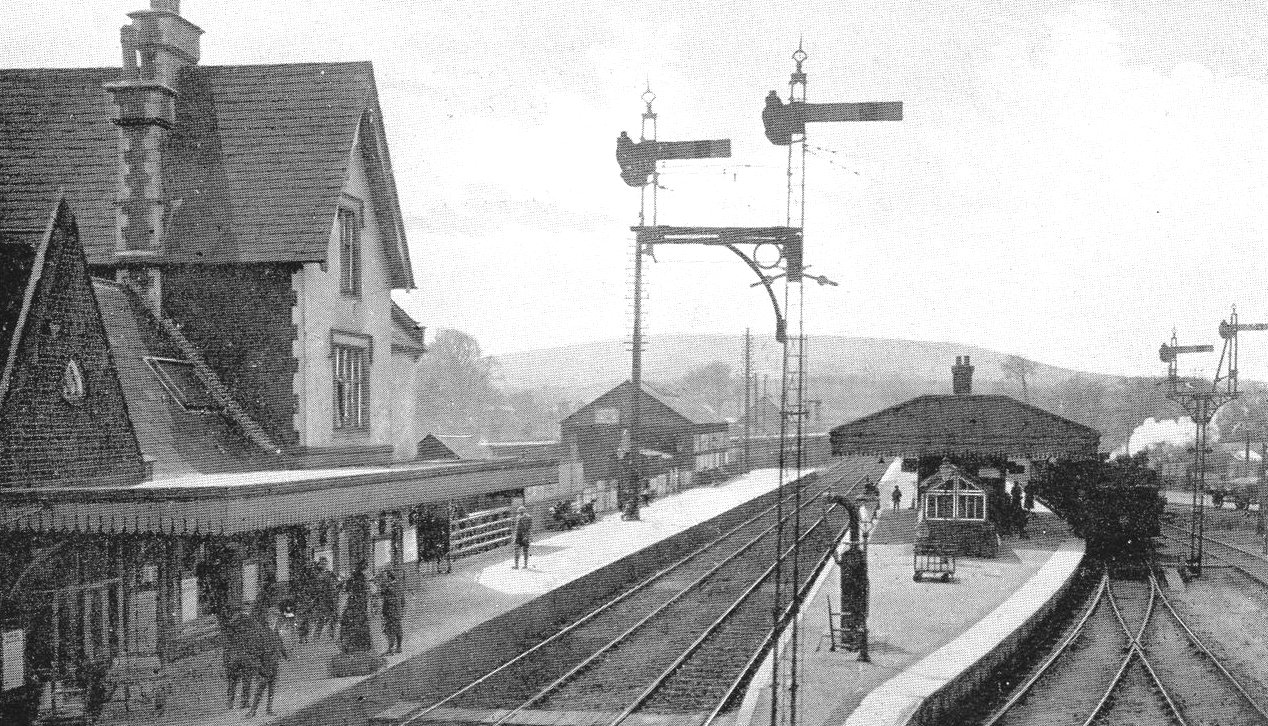
Petersfield station looking south; a Midhurst train is at the platform

Construction proceeded and Col. Yolland of the Board of Trade inspected the line on 27 May 1864. However he was dissatisfied with some signal locations, and he required a full double junction at Petersfield. This was attended to, and he gave his consent for opening on 18 August 1864. The line opened to the public on 1 September 1864. It was the first railway at Midhurst.

=== The Mid-Sussex Railway from Horsham ===
The London, Brighton and South Coast Railway constructed a branch line from Three Bridges to Horsham, opening it on 14 February 1848. The tract of land south-west of Horsham was largely agricultural, with no large settlements. The population of Petworth in 1851 was 2,439 and Midhurst had 1,481 inhabitants.

Despite the unpromising potential railway business, the LBSCR encouraged the formation of a nominally independent company to build a line from Horsham to Petworth. The Mid-Sussex Railway was promoted, and obtained its authorising act of Parliament, the Mid Sussex Railway Act 1857 (20 & 21 Vict. c. cxxxiii) on 10 August 1857. The line ran through Billingshurst and Pulborough. From there on to Petworth, the line was designed to remain on the south of the River Rother to minimise river crossings, with the result that the Petworth station was about 1 1/2 miles from the settlement itself, at a place known as Coultershaw Mill, a distance of 17 1/2 miles from Horsham. The LBSCR's Horsham station had been built as a terminus, and it was unsuitable for a continuation to Petworth, so a new and larger passenger station was built nearby by the LBSCR. Already at this stage, the idea of extending the line to Littlehampton was taking shape; this would run from a junction south of Pulborough, and the section from Horsham to that point was already referred to as the main line, and from there to Petworth as "the Coultershaw branch".

A ceremonial opening of the line took place on 10 August 1859, and full public operation started on 13 August 1859. The train service consisted of five passenger trains each way daily from Three Bridges.

The Mid-Sussex Railway was leased by the LBSCR and operated by it, and the company was taken over by the LBSCR by the London, Brighton and South Coast Railway (Additional Powers) Act 1864 (27 & 28 Vict. c. cccxiv) of 29 July 1864.

=== Mid-Sussex Junction Railway to Littlehampton ===
The Mid-Sussex Railway had been conceived as a line to Petworth and possibly Midhurst and Petersfield, although in fact the latter were connected by other companies. In the early stages of the construction of the Mid-Sussex Railway, it was decided to press on to Arundel and Littlehampton, and the LBSCR obtained authorisation to do so under the title of the Mid-Sussex Junction Railway. The powers to do this included doubling the original Mid-Sussex Railway between Horsham and a junction at Hardham, south of Pulborough. This line opened from Hardham Junction to Littlehampton on 3 August 1863.

=== The Mid-Sussex and Midhurst Railway ===
Mid Sussex and Midhurst Junction Railway Act 1859
- Act of Parliament
- Parliament of the United Kingdom
- Long title: An Act for making a Railway from the Coultershaw Branch of the Mid-Sussex Railway to the Town of Midhurst in the County of Sussex.
- Citation: 22 & 23 Vict. c. cxxv

Dates
- Royal assent: 13 August 1859

Long before the Mid-Sussex Railway was completed, an extension from Petworth to Midhurst was decided upon, and another nominally independent company was formed to construct it. This was the Mid-Sussex and Midhurst Railway, which was authorised to construct a line from Petworth to Midhurst by the Mid Sussex and Midhurst Junction Railway Act 1859 (22 & 23 Vict. c. cxxv) of 13 August 1859. Authorised share capital was £70,000 for a line of 5 1/2 miles. There had been plans to extend the line on to Petersfield, on the Portsmouth Direct line of the London and South Western Railway, but there was a territorial exclusivity agreement in place between the LBSCR and the LSWR. The LBSCR feared that the extension would breach the agreement and discouraged the inclusion of the Petersfield extension in the plans. That route was built by the Petersfield Railway company.

Mid Sussex and Midhurst Junction Railway Deviation Act 1860
- Act of Parliament
- Parliament of the United Kingdom
- Long title: An Act for enabling the Mid-Sussex and Midhurst Junction Railway Company to deviate a Portion of the authorized Line of the Mid-Sussex and Midhurst Junction Railway, 1859.
- Citation: 23 & 24 Vict. c. clxxii

Dates
- Royal assent: 23 July 1860

Text of statute as originally enacted

The Mid-Sussex and Midhurst Junction company had difficulty in raising share capital from the outset, and in the Mid Sussex and Midhurst Junction Railway Deviation Act 1860 (23 & 24 Vict. c. clxxii) the LBSCR was authorised to take £30,000 in shares.

Mid Sussex and Midhurst Junction Railway Sale or Lease Act 1862
- Act of Parliament
- Parliament of the United Kingdom
- Long title: An Act for enabling the Mid-Sussex and Midhurst Junction Rail way Company to extend the Time for completing their Railway; to sell or lease their Undertaking to the London, Brighton, and South Coast Railway Company; and for other Purposes.
- Citation: 25 & 26 Vict. c. ccx

Dates
- Royal assent: 7 August 1862

The company was authorised to lease its line to the LBSCR by the Mid Sussex and Midhurst Junction Railway Sale or Lease Act 1862 (25 & 26 Vict. c. ccx) of 7 August 1862, long before the line opened on 15 October 1866 and was acquired by the LBSCR by the London, Brighton and South Coast Railway (Capital and Powers) Act 1866 (29 & 30 Vict. c. cclxxxi) of 30 July 1866 but this did not take effect until June 1874. At Midhurst the act of Parliament authorising the Petersfield Railway, the Petersfield Railway Act 1860 (23 & 24 Vict. c. clxxiii) had prohibited it from extending to join the Mid-Sussex and Midhurst Junction railway, so that there were now two stations in the town, about a quarter mile apart.

=== Connecting the Midhurst stations ===
The LSWR (former Petersfield Railway) and the LBSCR (former Mid-Sussex and Midhurst Junction Railway) had two separate stations in Midhurst, not far apart. Colonel Yolland had commented adversely on the arrangement during his inspection of the Petersfield line on 18 August 1864. A goods-only connecting line, 11 chains in length, was made and opened on 17 December 1866.

== The Chichester and Midhurst Railway ==
Chichester and Midhurst Railway Act 1864
- Act of Parliament
- Parliament of the United Kingdom
- Long title: An Act to incorporate a Company for making "The Chichester and Midhurst Railway."
- Citation: 27 & 28 Vict. c. lxxv

Dates
- Royal assent: 23 June 1864

At the end of the 1850s a number of attempts were made to gain support for a Midhurst connection from Chichester, but these were unsuccessful. However in 1863 three separate, competing bills for a Chichester and Midhurst Railway were promoted, and went to Parliament for authorisation in the 1864 session. One of them was proposed by Lord Henry Gordon Lennox and William Townley Mitford, the members of Parliament for Chichester and Midhurst respectively. This was the scheme that was passed, incorporated by the Chichester and Midhurst Railway Act 1864 (27 & 28 Vict. c. lxxv) of 23 June 1864; capital was £190,000 and the length of the line was 11 3/4 miles. It was to run from a junction a mile west of Chichester and run to the Petersfield Railway's station at Midhurst, together with a south-to-west spur there forming a triangular junction. There was required to be a station at Lavant at which all trains had to stop.

Chichester and Midhurst Railway (Extension) Act 1865
- Act of Parliament
- Parliament of the United Kingdom
- Long title: An Act to enable the Chichester and Midhurst Railway Company to extend their Railway to the London and South-western Railway near Haslemere; and for other Purposes.
- Citation: 28 & 29 Vict. c. cccliv

Dates
- Royal assent: 5 July 1865

A shareholders' meeting at the end of 1864 approved an extension line to Haslemere, a distance of about 10 miles. Haslemere is on the Portsmouth to London line, north of Petersfield. At first the LBSCR and the LSWR opposed the scheme, but their opposition was later withdrawn, and the Chichester and Midhurst Railway (Extension) Act 1865 (28 & 29 Vict. c. cccliv) gained royal assent on 5 July 1865. Authorised capital was increased by a further £180,000, and the line was now to be 20 miles in extent.

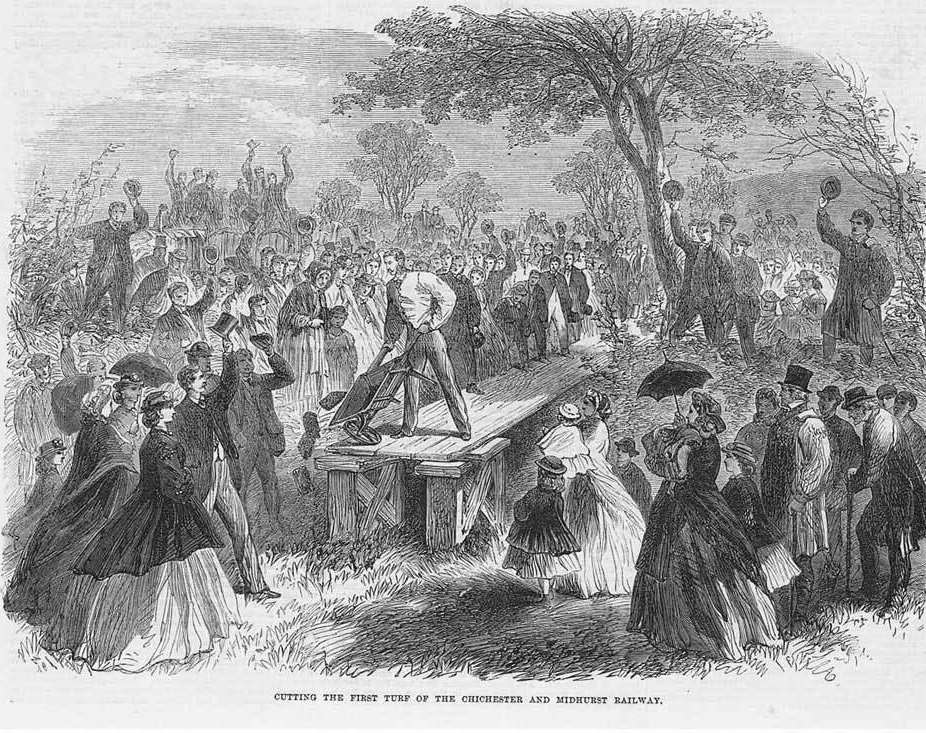
Cutting the first sod for the Chichester and Midhurst Railway

On 22 April 1865 the first sod had been cut by Lord Henry Lennox. Usually this activity was purely ceremonial, but

Mr Dobson handed Lord Lennox a steel spade… Lord Henry took off his coat and hat and immediately set to work digging – real digging. The labourers who crowded round seemed agreeably surprised at the manner in which his Lordship filled the barrow and ran it along the platform, at the end of which he shot the contents over the side.

— West Sussex Gazette

The LBSCR and the Chichester and Midhurst Railway boards had been negotiating for the eventual takeover of the smaller company, but the Haslemere extension now threatened infringement of the territorial exclusivity agreement, and the LBSCR broke off the acquisition negotiation. This immediately lay the LBSCR open to the possibility of a hostile competitor acquiring the Chichester and Midhurst line. The South Eastern Railway stepped forward, and was considering a new line from Dorking (in its line from Guildford to Reigate) to Midhurst; if it acquired the Midhurst line as well, it would have an instant opening into LBSCR territory. It further expressed an interest in extending from Chichester to Hayling Island.

In November 1865 the LBSCR hastily arranged to acquire the Midhurst company itself, for £95,000. The value was transferred by LBSCR directors personally acquiring Midhurst shares, and it was regularised by the London, Brighton and South Coast Railway (Capital and Powers) Act 1866 (29 & 30 Vict. c. cclxxxi). (Note: The reason for the device of the directors acting personally was probably to avoid the so-called Wharncliffe rules, whereby the shareholders would have to be convened to approve the acquisition by vote; the board may have thought there was no time to lose.)

Chichester and Midhurst Railway Extension Abandonment Act 1868
- Act of Parliament
- Parliament of the United Kingdom
- Long title: An Act for the Abandonment of the Railway authorized by The Chichester and Midhurst Railway (Extension) Act, 1865.
- Citation: 31 & 32 Vict. c. clxii

Dates
- Royal assent: 31 July 1868

In the summer of 1866 the banking house of Overend, Gurney and Company failed, causing widespread panic in the money markets, resulting in extremely limited access to investment. The opportunity was taken within eight months to abandon the proposed Haslemere extension. The abandonment was sanctioned by the Chichester and Midhurst Railway Extension Abandonment Act 1868 (31 & 32 Vict. c. clxii) of 31 July 1868, but there were a series of claims from creditors trailing the simple decision. The LBSCR considered trying to recover the money from the directors of the Midhurst company (who had given personal guarantees) but this proved impractical, and the LBSCR took most of the loss, amounting to well over £70,000, itself.

London, Brighton, and South Coast Railway (Chichester and Midhurst Railway) Act 1876
- Act of Parliament
- Parliament of the United Kingdom
- Long title: An Act for authorising the London Brighton and South Coast Railway Company to make a Railway from their Railway at Chichester to their Mid-Sussex and Midhurst Junction Railway at Midhurst; and for other purposes.
- Citation: 39 & 40 Vict. c. cix

Dates
- Royal assent: 13 July 1876

Text of statute as originally enacted

The construction of the original Chichester to Midhurst line was suspended, and all but abandoned, until in 1872 a group of local speculators proposed taking over the construction. Their obvious intention was to sell the works on to the highest bidder, but they did not press the scheme forward until 1875 when they presented a parliamentary bill. The LBSCR objected, and in Parliament the company managed to take control of the proposals. The London, Brighton, and South Coast Railway (Chichester and Midhurst Railway) Act 1876 (39 & 40 Vict. c. cix) of 13 July 1876 was passed, giving the LBSCR control of the now defunct Chichester and Midhurst company's assets. The route was amended slightly in 1877. The junction at Midhurst was to be altered so that LBSCR trains from Chichester could continue without reversal to Pulborough; This involved moving the Midhurst station eastwards.

A late enhancement to the line was made when the LBSCR arranged to provide a separate independent track from the point of junction near Fishbourne into Chichester station to avoid interruption to main line trains. Three tunnels were required on the line and the very difficult geology made them expensive. The completed line was calculated to have cost over £291,000.

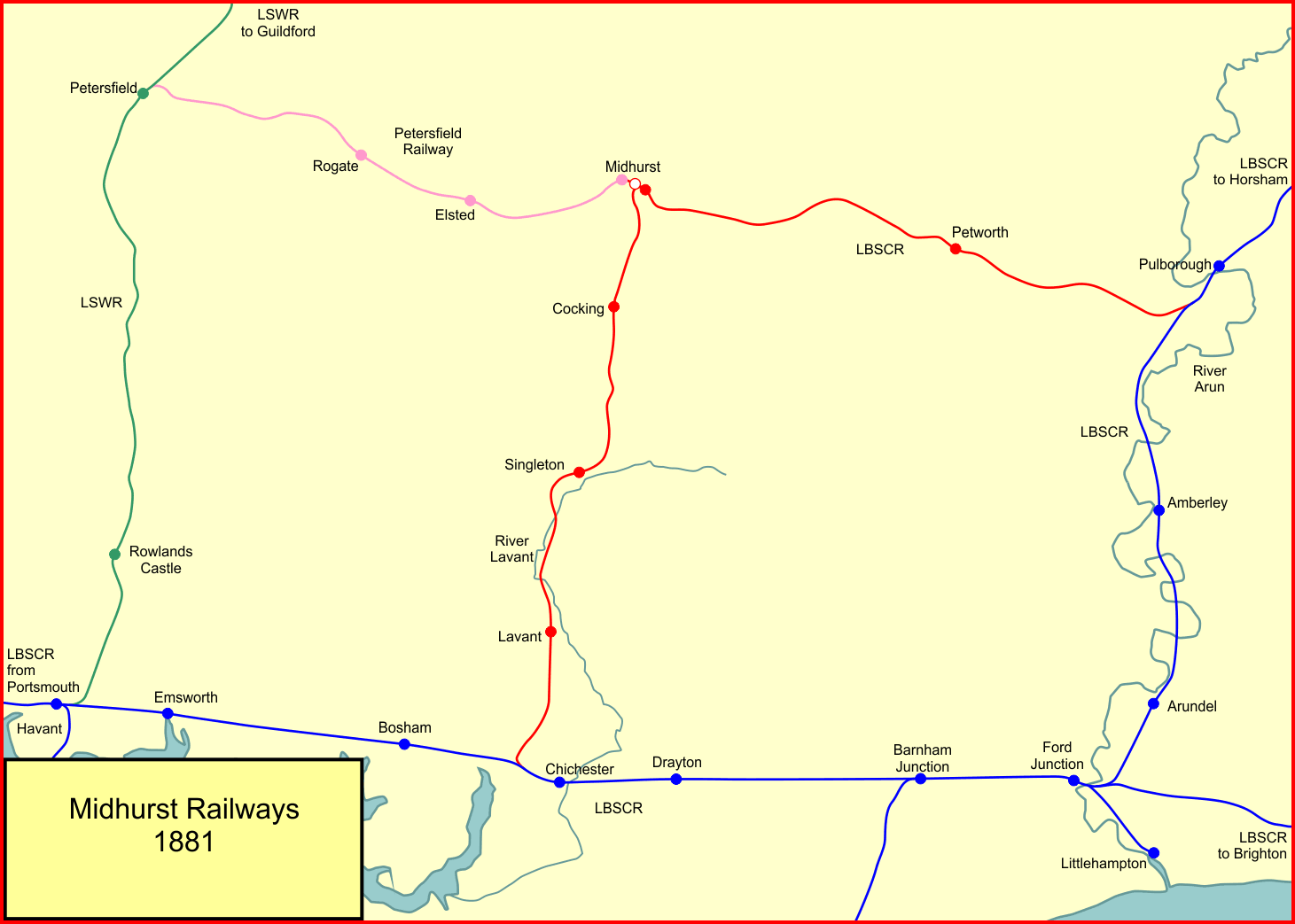
Midhurst railways in 1881

Col. Yolland of the Board of Trade visited the line on 24 June 1881 but was not satisfied that the works were complete and safe. Yolland revisited in July and approved the line, and it opened to the public on 11 July 1881.

Singleton station was provided with four platform faces and extensive siding accommodation, so as to deal with the peak traffic associated with Goodwood races. As the line now used the new Midhurst station, the earlier Mid-Sussex & Midhurst Railway station there was reduced to the status of a goods station.

=== Combination of the stations at Midhurst ===
In 1866 a siding connection had been made between the LSWR station at Midhurst and the MS&MJR station there. It was intended purely for occasional wagon transfer, and was expected to be worked by horse traction. Accordingly a bridge over Bepton Road was made of light construction, inadequate to carry locomotives. When Col. Yolland inspected the Chichester line on 10 July 1881 he commented adversely on the fact that passengers making an interconnection at Midhurst had to walk in the open between the two stations, and he recommended that the LSWR be brought into the new LBSCR station without delay.

This issue continued to be a sore for some time, and eventually West Sussex County Council pursued the matter to the Railway and Canal Commissioners in October 1892. The cost to make a full connection was estimated at £1,600 and neither the LSWR nor the LBSCR felt that this would be money well spent, in view of the limited volume of through passenger business. The LSWR indeed asserted that Midhurst was the "leanest part of their leanest district". Moreover the timetable of passenger trains was determined by connections out of main line trains at Petersfield and Pulborough respectively, and arranging close connectional times would disrupt that. The commissioners conceded the railway position, and made no direction on the matter.

=== Royal visits ===
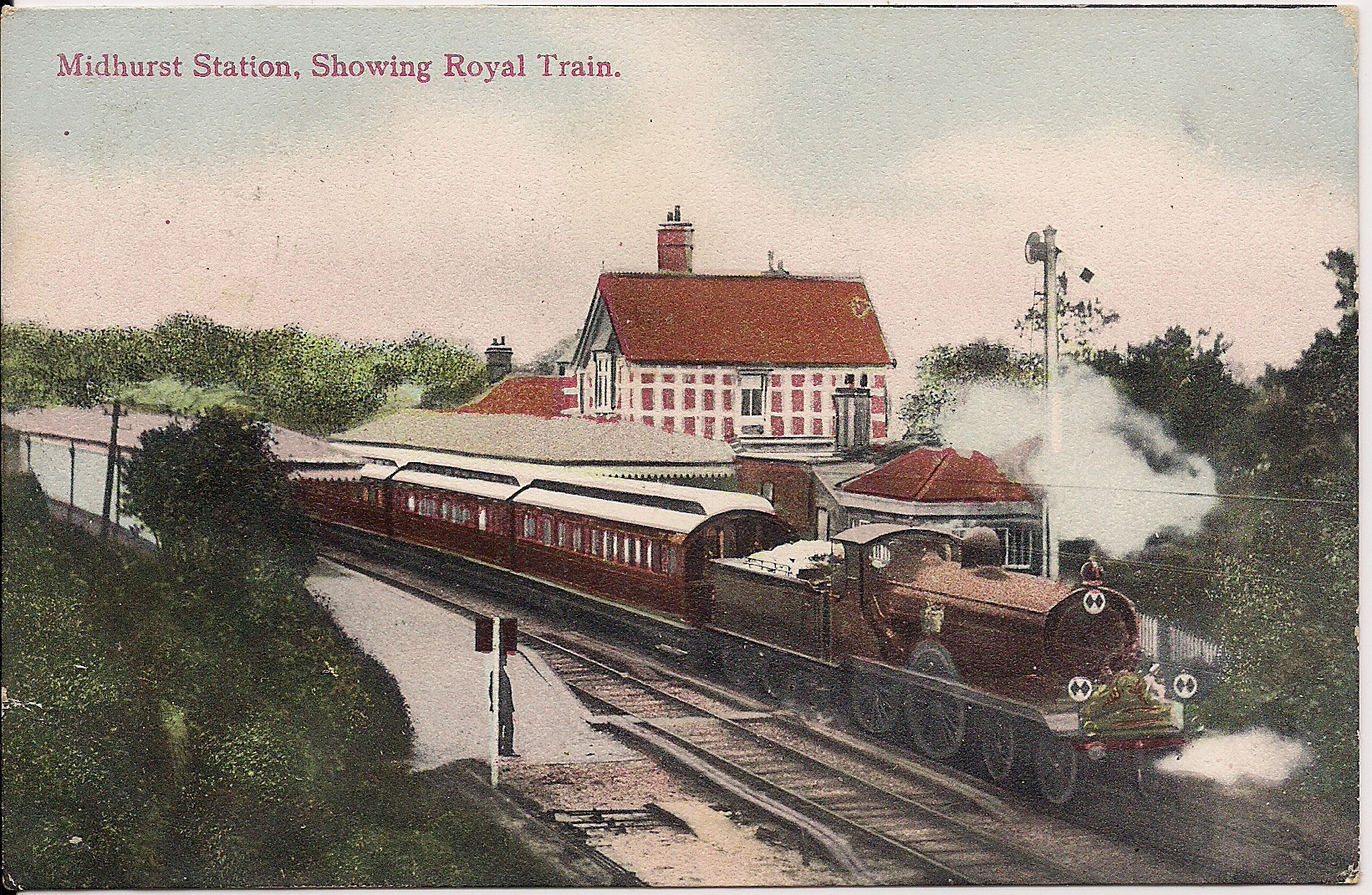
The royal train at Midhurst (LBSCR) on 13 June 1906

Goodwood races attracted royal visitors, and the royal train was frequently used to bring the Prince of Wales, among others. In addition he often visited West Dean House, near Singleton station, where he had close friends.

== Passenger train services ==
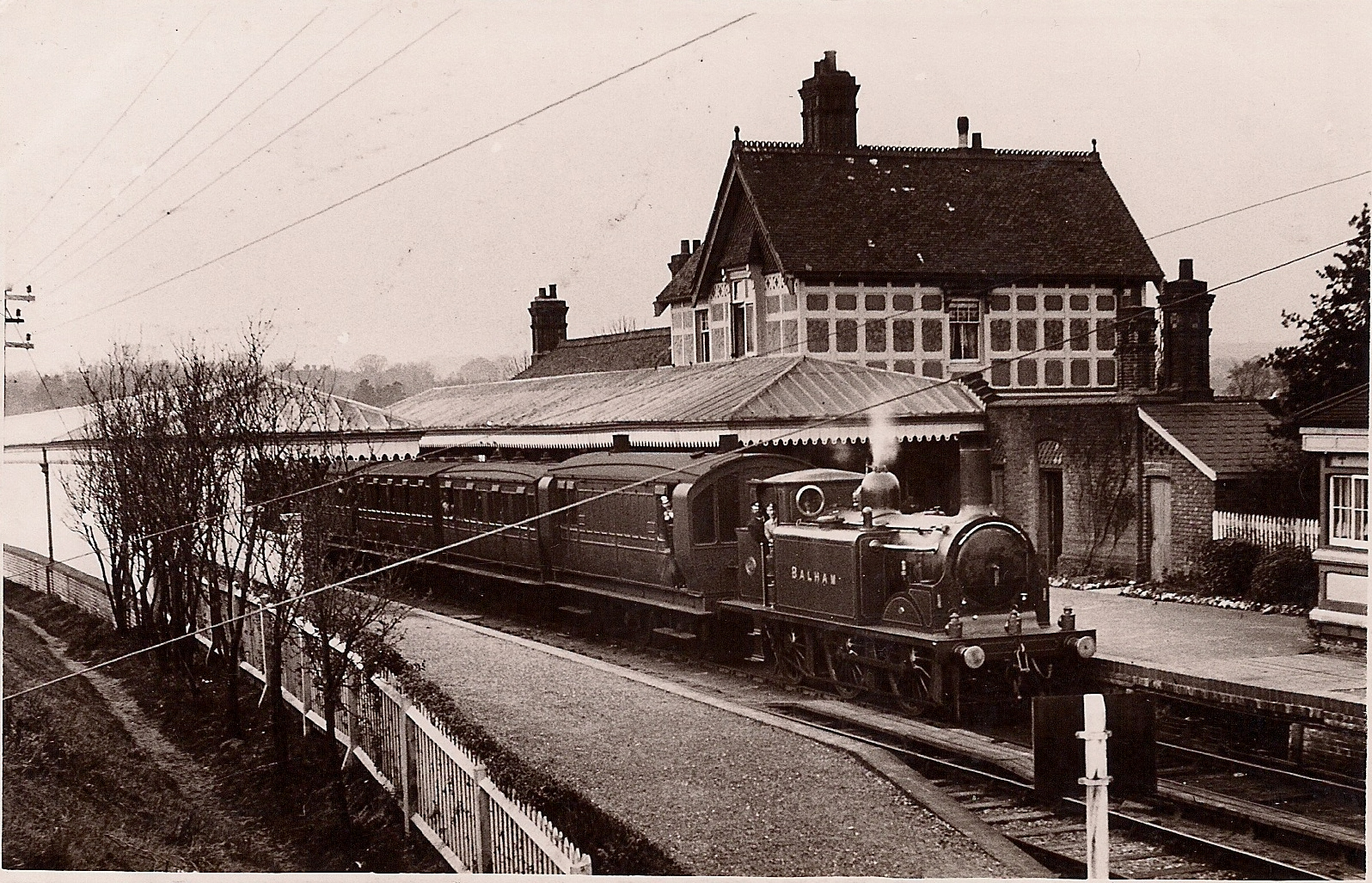
Midhurst LBSCR station

The Petersfield line operated five trains each way daily (not Sunday) at first, and this gradually increased to eleven by 1913. After the First World War two of the services worked through to Portsmouth.

The first Mid-Sussex Railway service (Horsham to Petworth) was five trains daily (not Sundays), increasing to eight when the line through to Midhurst was opened. This service remained broadly unchanged, but in 1864 a slip coach was dropped at Pulborough from the 16:05 London Bridge to Portsmouth train, continuing to Midhurst, arriving at 17:28.

The Chichester to Midhurst line had six trains daily (not Sundays); there was an 08:15 from Chichester to London via Midhurst and Pulborough, until March 1929.

In the period 1937 and 1938 both the former LSWR and former LBSCR routes from London to Portsmouth were electrified, using a new regular-interval timetable pattern. The Midhurst branch trains had to fit in to the connectional times, and trains running through Midhurst usually had to wait for some time there to co-ordinate.

== Southern Railway, and then decline ==
Following the Railways Act 1921 most of the railways of Great Britain were “grouped” into one or other of four new large companies; the arrangement took nominal effect on the first day of 1923. Both the LSWR and the LBSCR were transferred into the Southern Railway, and the competition between those two companies was officially at an end. The long drawn-out problem of the separate stations at Midhurst was finally resolved, when the Southern Railway strengthened the connecting line between the two stations, closing the former Petersfield Railway station; now from 17 July 1925 all trains used the 1881 LBSCR station. In the 1930s competition from road transport, both goods and passenger, started to become significant, and carryings on the railway declined over that decade and subsequently. This was especially marked due to the purely rural nature of the lines' business.

=== Chichester to Midhurst ===
The decision was taken to close the passenger service between Chichester and Midhurst, and this took effect on 7 July 1935.

A limited goods service continued but during the Second World War the line took up a new duty. Singleton and Cocking tunnels were used for storing wagons containing naval ammunition the period of stabling lasted from 1940 until 1944. After the war a heavy seasonal traffic in sugar beet developed, and for the time being general goods traffic was buoyant. A pick-up goods ran over the line from Chichester to Horsham, returning on the Arundel line.

On the morning of 19 November 1951 the morning goods train from Chichester ran into a washout, where a culvert had been washed away. The locomotive dropped into the stream below. The locomotive was eventually recovered but it was decided that it was uneconomic to reinstate the line, which was therefore permanently severed at this point, some distance south of Midhurst. For the time being, Lavant, Singleton and Cocking goods stations were served from Chichester as a dead-end branch. Singleton and Cocking goods stations were closed on 28 August 1957.

Ordinary goods services on what was now the Lavant branch were discontinued from 5 August 1968, and the seasonal sugar beet traffic was the only remaining traffic; it too ceased in 1970.

The branch was dormant for some time, but in January 1972 a gravel extraction business opened a rail connection, operating from a site near Lavant; block trains ran to Drayton, not far east of Chichester, where there was a washery. Trains of eleven 90 tonnes gross laden weight wagons operated six return trips a day. The site was operated by John Hever Limited. A slight realignment of the track at Lavant and a dramatic gradient took the track down under hydraulically operated feed hoppers. The traffic continued until 1992, when the PGA wagons were stored out of use at Chichester.

=== Hardham Junction to Midhurst ===
The line was closed in stages, first to passenger trains from 7 February 1955, then goods services were withdrawn from Selham and Fittleworth Stations May 1963. The Midhurst to Petworth section was closed completely on 18 October 1964; the Petworth to Hardham section continued until 20 May 1966.

=== Petersfield to Midhurst ===
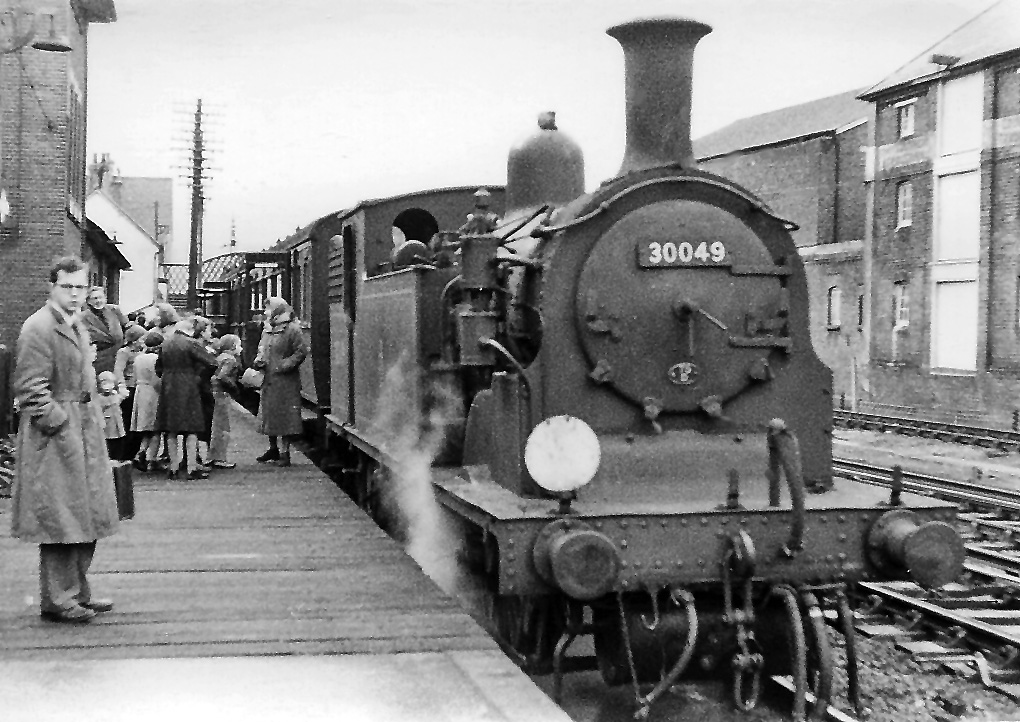
An auto train from Pulborough at Petersfield on the last day of passenger operation on the branch

The Petersfield service carried very little traffic in the twentieth century, and British Railways closed it completely from 7 February 1955.

== Centurion Way Railway Path ==
Centurion Way Railway Path is a cycling, horse-riding and walking pathway on part of the Midhurst to Chichester railway section, from Chichester to Singleton.

== Petworth hotel ==
The former railway station at Petworth had been converted and as of 2022 operates as a bed and breakfast and afternoon tea business. Pullman carriages have been installed and are used as bedrooms.

== Topography ==
=== Gradients ===
The Chichester line climbed continuously, mostly at 1 in 76, from Fishbourne Crossing to Singleton tunnel, then descended at about the same gradient to a point just short of Midhurst.

=== Locations ===
- Petersfield; on Portsmouth Direct line; opened 1 January 1859; still open;
- Rogate (known as Rogate for Harting, actually at Nyewood, a hamlet between the two villages); opened 1 September 1864; closed 7 February 1955;
- Elsted; opened 1 September 1864; closed 7 February 1955;
- Midhurst LSWR; opened 1 September 1864; closed 12 July 1925;
- Midhurst LBSCR second station; below.

- Fishbourne Crossing;
- Lavant; opened 11 July 1881; closed 7 July 1935; used for a Goodwood Race Special Train 26 July 1954;
- West Dean Tunnel; 445 yards;
- Singleton; opened 11 July 1881; closed 7 July 1935;
- Singleton Tunnel; 741 yards;
- Cocking Tunnel; 738 yards;
- Cocking; opened 11 July 1881; closed 7 July 1935.
- Midhurst LBSCR second station; below.

- Midhurst LBSCR first station; opened 15 October 1866; closed 11 July 1881;
- Midhurst LBSCR second station; opened 11 July 1881; closed 7 February 1955;
- Midhurst Tunnel; 276 yards;
- Selham; opened 1 July 1872; closed 7 February 1955;
- Petworth; opened 10 October 1859; closed 7 February 1955;
- Fittleworth; opened 2 September 1889; closed 7 February 1955;
- Hardham Junction.

== Locomotives used on the lines ==
On the London Brighton and South Coast Railway lines the Midhurst to Pulborough services were worked by various engines designed by J. C. Craven, until the 1880s when William Stroudley's famous 'Terriers' took over. These were in turn replaced by D1 tanks, the last survivor of which was used on the line during its last days. These were replaced by D3 tanks, then ex LSWR M7s which hauled the last passenger trains in 1955. A succession of ex LBSCR designs were used on freight trains, including C2xs and E4s, together with occasional turns with Southern Railway tender engines Q & Q1 as well. The lines did see some diesel locomotives in the last freight days, mostly class 08 shunters, although Class 33 main line diesels ran to Midhurst in that station's last year. Also Class 73 electro-diesels were used on gravel workings between Chichester and Lavant until 1991.
