= The Brighton to Portsmouth line of the LBSCR =

History of Brighton to Portsmouth railway line, England

The Portsmouth to Brighton Railway was built by the London, Brighton and South Coast Railway and its immediate predecessor in several stages.

The London and Brighton Railway built a branch line from Brighton to Shoreham, an important seaport. The branch opened in 1840. Under the London Brighton and South Coast Railway the line was extended progressively to Portsmouth, reached in 1847. The London and South Western Railway had a roundabout connection to Portsmouth, and the final route section on Portsea Island was operated jointly with the LSWR. Although the LBSCR coast route connected many important resorts, the trunk route from London to Portsmouth was commercially dominant, and the LSWR acquired the Portsmouth Direct Line, which was a better and shorter route. The LBSCR took steps to improve its own route, but it never became fully competitive with the LSWR for London traffic.

The line became the stem of several branch lines, as holiday travel, and later residential travel rose in importance, equalling agriculture and light industry. From 1906 steam railmotors were used in connection with new halts, simple low-cost passenger stations, and in 1937 the line was electrified on the third-rail system as part of an ambitious modernisation scheme implemented by the later Southern Railway.

Although some of the inland branches have closed, the coastal route and most of the coastal connections continue in use at the present day. A busy passenger train service operates on the line, including through journeys to the adjacent line to Southampton, under the branding West Coastway.

== History ==
=== London and Brighton Railway ===
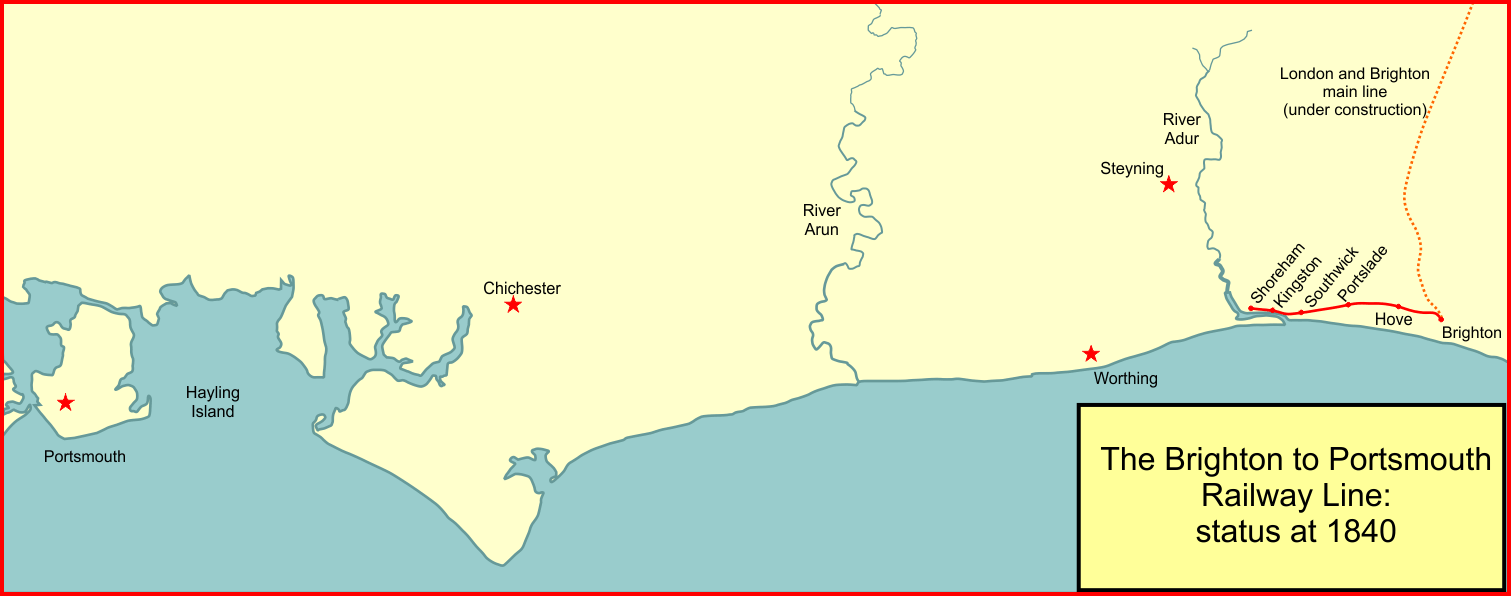
First moves from Brighton westward: 1840

The London and Brighton Railway was authorised the London and Brighton Railway Act 1837 (7 Will. 4 & 1 Vict. c. cxix) on 15 July 1837. It was to build from a junction with the London and Croydon Railway at Norwood to Brighton, and to build branches east and west at Brighton, to Lewes and Newhaven, and to Shoreham. At that time Shoreham was an important port, and ease of trading with the continent of Europe was considered essential.

Land acquisition was a slow process, and contracts for construction were let in 1838 and 1839. A contract for the Shoreham branch was let to John Hale and George Wythes of Frimley. However it was reported in April 1839 that the permanent way on the Shoreham branch had been laid for a distance of nearly four miles, and that Hove tunnel was well forward.

The Shoreham branch was much easier to construct than the main line, and it was realised that it would be complete at least a year before the main line. On 12 April 1839 it was decided to proceed with one line only the Shoreham branch until the works were complete, thus delaying unnecessary expenditure.

=== Opening of the first part of the line ===
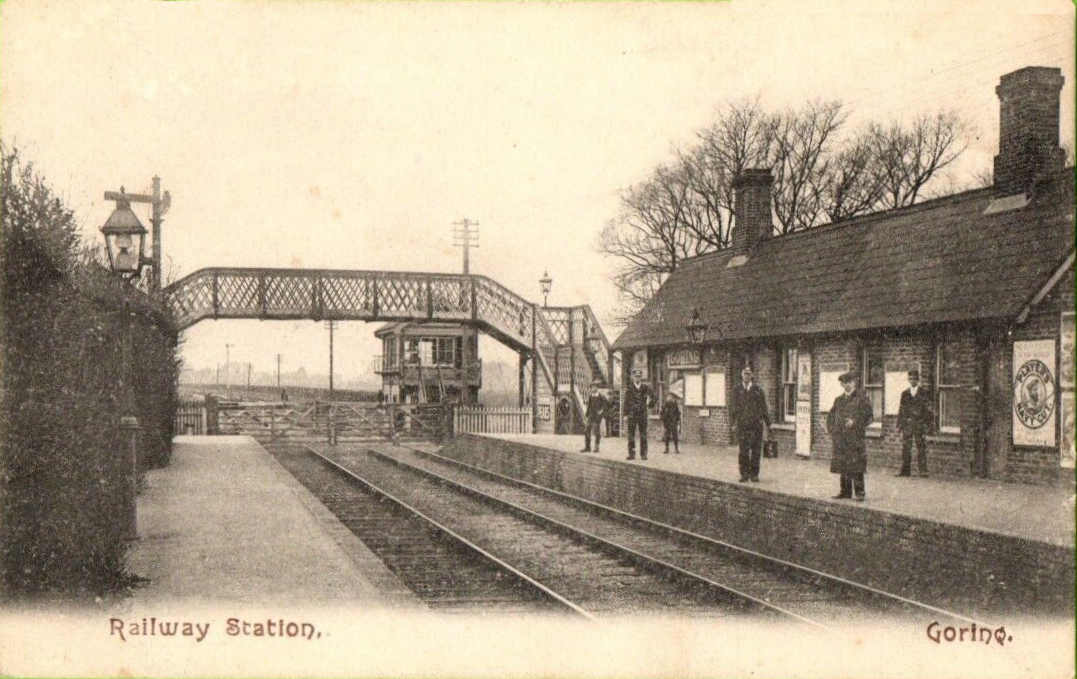
Goring-by-Sea station

The Brighton to Shoreham line was opened to passengers on 12 May 1840. The main line from London did not open to Brighton until 21 September 1841. It is likely that goods traffic started a few days before 26 July 1841.

The harbour at Kingston, a short distance to the east of the Shoreham terminus, was important commercially, and it soon became a principal port for crossings to and from Dieppe. The wharf was accessed by a short inclined plane running at right angles to the main line and the waterfront; there were wagon turntables at each end, and haulage was by a chain connected to a stationary engine; on the wharf horses provided the traction. The access to the wharf had to cross the turnpike road; a level crossing had been authorised in the company's act of Parliament, but the turnpike trustees objected to it, and an impasse developed. The disagreement was eventually resolved after recourse to legal advice, in favour of the company.

By 8 July 1840 more than 300,000 passengers had been carried. However, there had been numerous personal accidents; over 240 people had been admitted to hospital.

The company considered taking road coaches by rail on the branch, on 8 March 1841. The bad state of the roads was a matter of concern to the coach proprietors, and as a result the committee decided that two wagons should be altered to carriage trucks, and temporary stages for loading were to be erected at Brighton and Shoreham. (Note: The word proprietor probably means simply the private owner, not the operator of a commercial business. This is a very early version of Motorail, 1966 to 2005.)

If there were thoughts at this stage of extending to Portsmouth, then the issue became urgent when the London and South Western Railway opened its line to Gosport, connecting to Portsmouth by a ferry, referred to at the time as a floating bridge. The Gosport line was opened in 1841. The LSWR was robust in maintaining that Gosport was a perfectly adequate railhead for Portsmouth, and yet there were already calls for a further LSWR line from Fareham, on the Gosport line, to Portsmouth around the head of Portsmouth Harbour.

==== Early train services ====
In 1844 the Shoreham passenger service consisted of nine trains each way between Brighton and Shoreham. Five down and six up trains are annotated in Bradshaw's Guide (Note: Bradshaw' Guide was a publisher of railway timetables on sale to the public.) to the effect that first class passengers may be booked throughout between London and Shoreham by those trains "without change of carriage or removal of luggage; second and third class passengers may go by the same trains but they will be liable to a change of carriage".

==== Extending to Chichester ====
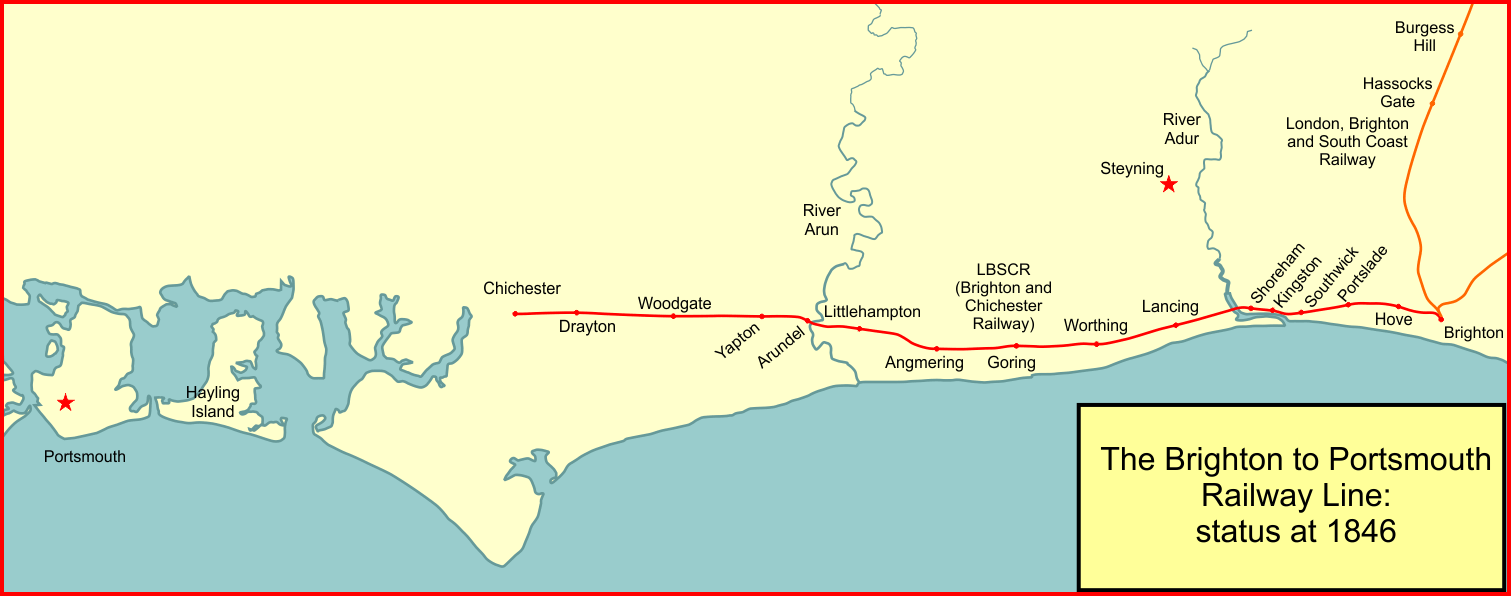
Reaching Chichester: 1846

Proposals came forward for a Brighton and Chichester Railway, and it was supported by the London and Brighton Railway, which agreed to work the line when it was ready. The Brighton and Chichester Railway got its authorising act of Parliament, the Brighton and Chichester Railway Act 1844 (7 & 8 Vict. c. lxvii), on 4 July 1844. Authorised share capital was £300,000 on the basis of building a double track formation but only laying a single track. The London and Brighton Railway was empowered to purchase the line. Among the stations were Littlehampton, Arundel and Bognor, all some distance from the communities in their name and all replaced by stations on other lines later on.

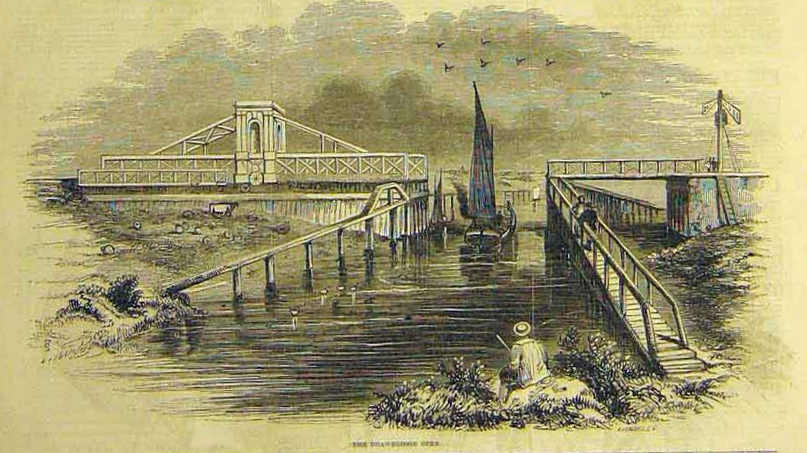
River Arun railway bridge at Ford in open position

The bridge over the River Arun at "Arundel" (later Ford) had to be made capable of being opened and providing a 60 feet clear passage for vessels on the river; a structure with two sliding and turning spans was installed. On the eastern shore a structure was located on tracks running at right angles to the railway. To open the bridge, this structure was moved laterally, to the south, making a space immediately to the east of the main bridge structure. This was a balanced beam 144 feet long, on a wheeled carriage, and could now be moved eastwards on its own wheels into the gap now created. The main structure was timber, weighing 70 tons, and the bridge was made for a single track only. Two men and a boy were said to be capable of opening and closing the bridge.

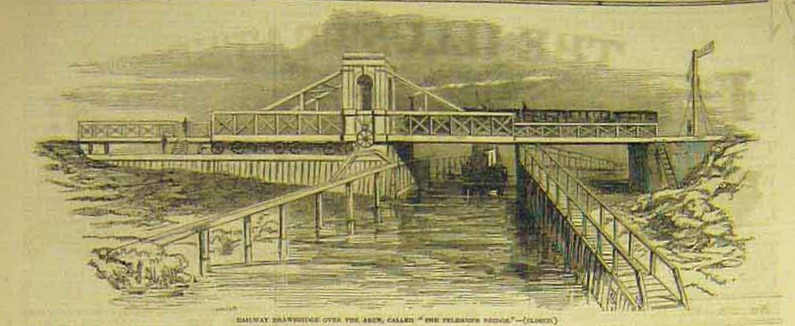
River Arun railway bridge at Ford in closed position

The line was opened in stages: from Shoreham to Worthing on 24 November 1845; from Worthing to "Littlehampton" (Lyminster) on 16 March 1846; and from there to Chichester on 8 June 1846.

==== Formation of the London, Brighton and South Coast Railway ====
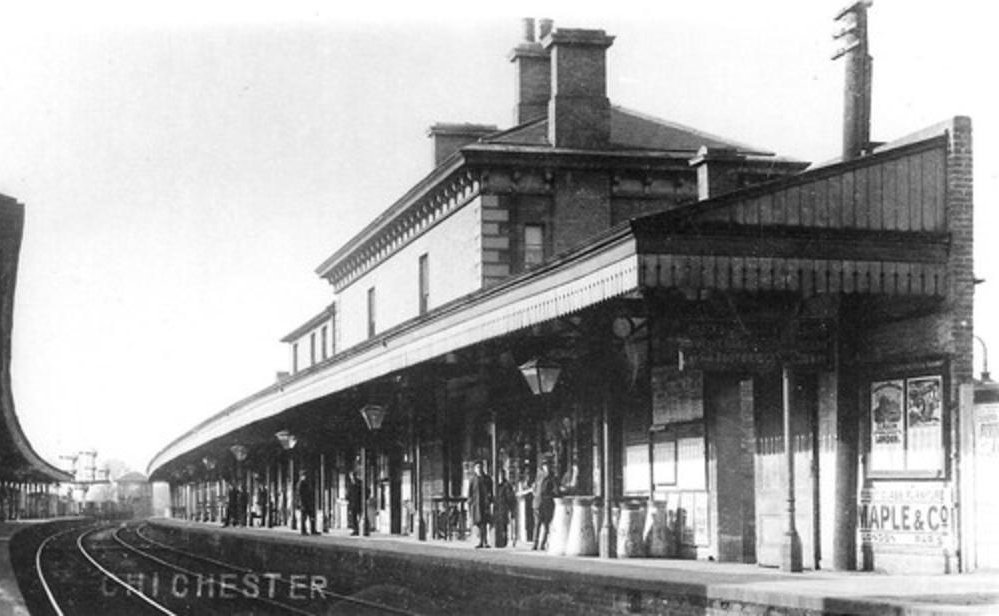
Chichester station

The London and Brighton Railway had been independent of neighbouring railway companies, and often on difficult terms with them. However the advantages of combination became increasingly clear, and this led to the formation of the London, Brighton and South Coast Railway, by the amalgamation of the London and Brighton Railway and the London and Croydon Railway. Three other companies were absorbed into the new LBSCR: the Croydon and Epsom Railway, the Brighton, Lewes and Hastings Railway, and the Brighton and Chichester Railway. The creation of the LBSCR was authorised by the London and Brighton Railway Act 1846 (9 & 10 Vict. c. cclxxxii) of 27 July 1846; its aggregate authorised share capital was £5,581,000.

==== Reaching Portsmouth ====
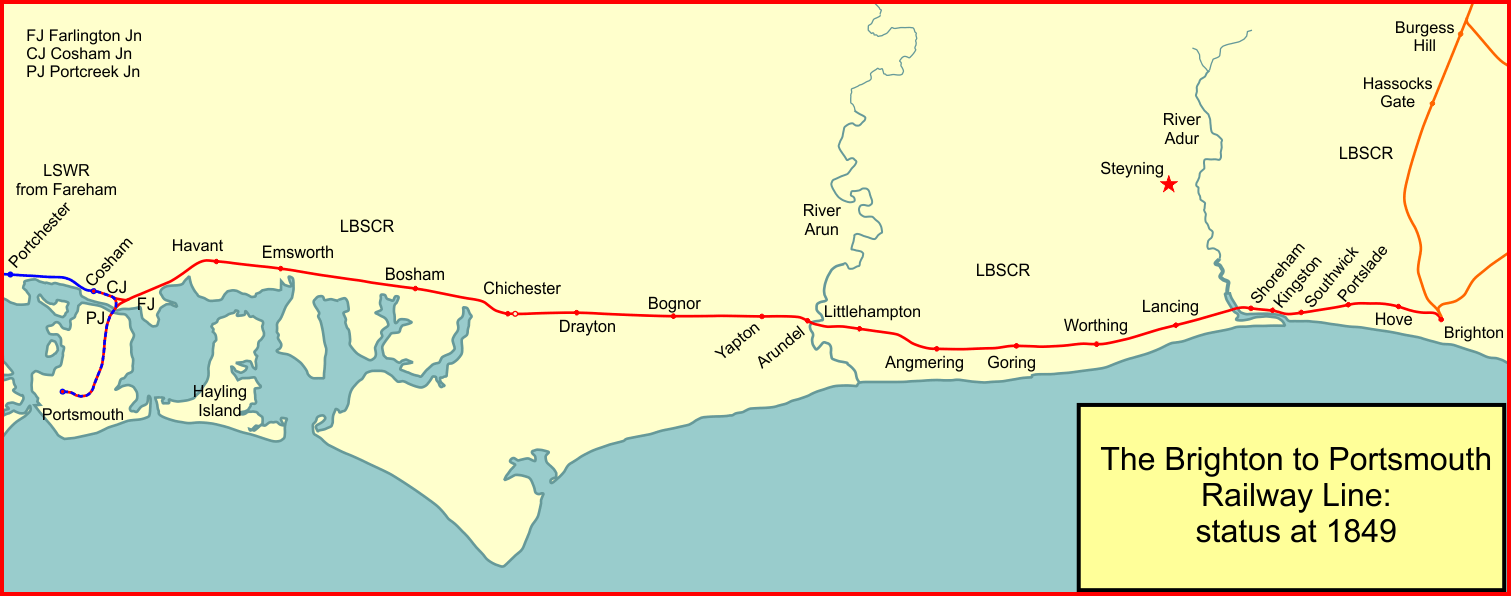
into Portsmouth: 1849

Railway from Portsmouth to Chichester Act 1845
- Act of Parliament
- Parliament of the United Kingdom
- Long title: An Act for making a Railway from the Brighton and Chichester Railway to Portsmouth, with a Branch to Fareham.
- Citation: 8 & 9 Vict. c. cxcix

Dates
- Royal assent: 8 August 1845

Text of statute as originally enacted

There was continuing dissatisfaction in Portsmouth with its rail connection to London; this was provided by the LSWR from Gosport, via Bishopstoke. In 1844 a number of schemes were put forward, but the Brighton and Chichester Railway's own proposal, an extension from Chichester to Portsmouth, was the only serious possibility, and it obtained the Railway from Portsmouth to Chichester Act 1845 (8 & 9 Vict. c. cxcix) on 8 August 1845.

The LSWR was planning an extension to Portsmouth from Fareham, on its Gosport branch line, through Cosham and into Portsea Island. The LBSCR was authorised to build a branch to Fareham from its new line unless the LSWR built the line itself. In the event the LBSCR built to a point just west of Cosham and the LSWR from there to Fareham. The Cosham line ran from a triangular junction, at Farlington Junction and Portcreek Junction. The line from the meeting point just west of Cosham to Portsmouth was made joint between the Brighton company and the LSWR.

The lines were opened progressively:

- Chichester — Havant: 15 March 1847
- Havant — Portsmouth: 14 June 1847
- Farlington Junction — Cosham 26 July 1848 (for goods) and 2 January 1860 for passengers
- Portcreek Junction — Cosham Junction 1 September 1848 (for goods); and for passengers 11 October 1848
- Cosham — Fareham: 1 September 1848:(LSWR).

Although the Cosham connection gave the LSWR a through route from London to Portsmouth, it continued to emphasise the Gosport line as the preferred means of access for London passengers.

== Early branch lines ==
As an early trunk railway, the Brighton to Portsmouth line was the connection for several branch lines.

=== The Adur Valley Line ===
When the London and Brighton Railway was being planned, there was a body of opinion that the best route for the main line would be through the Mole Gap, where the River Mole cuts a valley through the North Downs, between Leatherhead and Dorking. Further south this line would have reached the south coast at Shoreham, at the time an important seaport, and then run east to Brighton. That plan did not get adopted, and the Brighton main line ran further east.

In the 1850s the London and South Western Railway and the London, Brighton and South Coast Railway became adversaries over claiming territory: if a company could establish itself as dominant in an area, a rival found it difficult to break in to the area and compete. On 5 May 1845 the London and South Western Railway opened its line to Guildford,

The LSWR was known to be interested in extending from there through Horsham to Steyning, and this motivated the LBSCR to build what became the Adur Valley Line, from Steyning to Horsham. It opened throughout on 16 September 1861. Although appearing to have useful potential for through traffic, the line never developed beyond a purely local rural line.

=== Arundel and Littlehampton ===
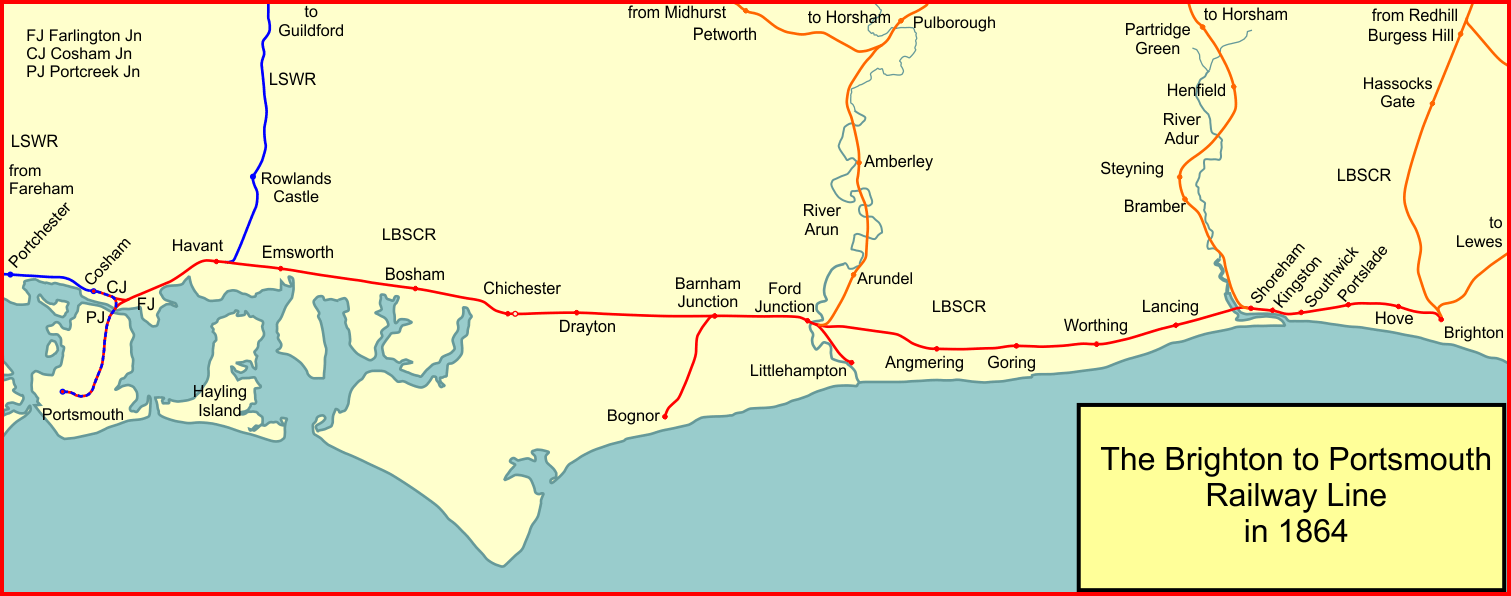
Branch lines flourish: 1864

The opening of the Portsmouth Direct Line in 1859 emphasised the inferiority of the LBSCR route to Portsmouth. The movable River Arun bridge at "Arundel" station (later renamed Ford station) needed to be widened as it formed the only remaining piece of single track on the Portsmouth line. Negotiations with the Admiralty, as guardians of navigable waterways, resulted in agreement by them to narrow the channel, reducing the cost of the bridgeworks. A condition for this was that the LBSCR build a new line from Littlehampton, through the "Arundel" station and on to Arundel itself, and connecting at Pulborough with the existing LBSCR line from Horsham to Midhurst, known as the Mid-Sussex Line.

The LBSCR was happy to be obliged to do this, as previous enquiry had shown that the LSWR would oppose an LBSCR initiative of this kind. The new line from Pulborough to Ford was to be known as the Mid-Sussex Junction Line.

The new Ford bridge was a drawbridge; formed for double track and made of iron, it had a 99-feet long moveable section. The bearing support at the west side of the river could be withdrawn and the west end of the moveable section dropped a little at the point. It was supported near the centre so the other (eastern) end rose accordingly, and the whole span could be drawn back, riding over the fixed structure as it did so. The motion was arranged by a hand winch, but returning to the closed position was by gravity down the slope formed by the inclination of the moveable span.

The Mid-Sussex Junction line opened on 3 August 1863, forming part of a double-track route from London. At this stage the Portsmouth Direct Line was still single track.

The Littlehampton branch had been authorised as part of the London, Brighton and South Coast Railway Act 1860 (23 & 24 Vict. c. clxxi), and it opened on 17 August 1863. It had a junction at Ford Junction station; the station had formerly been known as Arundel, but on 3 August 1863, when the Mid-Sussex Junction line opened with a new Arundel station, the old one was renamed Ford Junction (later altered to Ford).

For the time being the junction for Littlehampton was aligned for direct running from the Chichester direction, and this meant that traffic from the London direction, and from Brighton, could not run directly to the branch. In 1866 powers had been obtained to build a direct connection from the Arundel direction towards Littlehampton, but the Board of Trade objected to its actual construction, as it would have involved a flat crossing of the Brighton main line eastward. A spur leading from Littlehampton towards Brighton was also authorised, but not constructed. In 1876 powers were obtained to make the junctions, by realigning the eastward main line some distance to the north, to enable it to join the Arundel line north of the convergence of the Littlehampton line. By that means the flat crossing could be avoided, and trains approaching both from Brighton and from Arundel could run directly to Littlehampton. The westward spur towards Ford was unaffected.

The commissioning of these arrangements was much delayed. The relocation of the main line was opened on 28 September 1885, although the telegraph pole route remained in situ on the old formation. The east curve from the Littlehampton line – the whole point of the construction – opened on 1 January 1887.

For a while Littlehampton had been developed by the LBSCR as a port for shipping to Saint-Malo, in 1867, and Jersey and Honfleur in 1870.

=== Bognor branch ===
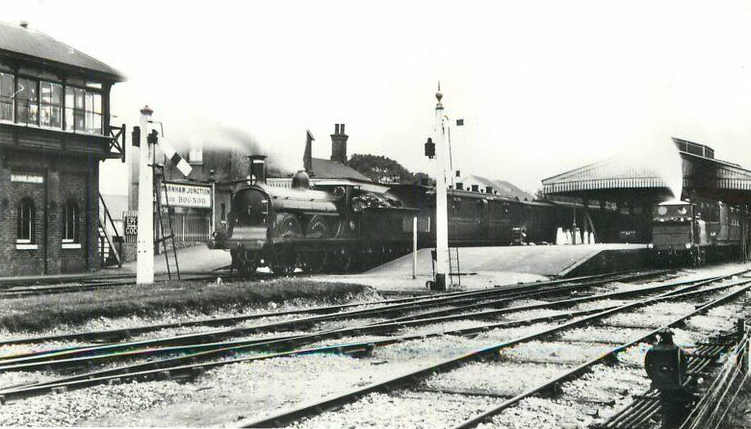
Barnham railway station; the train at the left is in the Bognor platform

Local interests promoted a Bognor branch line; it opened on 1 June 1864 from a new junction station at Barnham. The old Bognor (or Woodgate) station on the main line closed on the same day. At first direct running to and from the branch was not possible, and it was not until remodelling at Barnham in 1911 that through running, from the Arundel direction, was possible.

=== Portsmouth Direct Line ===
The connection at Cosham had given the LSWR access to Portsmouth via Fareham, but the company preferred to emphasise the Gosport route for London passengers. The LBSCR route was via Brighton, at this stage reversing there. Both routes were indirect and unsatisfactory to the travelling public, although the two main line railways noted that their fares were based on mileage travelled, and a new shorter route would, they calculated, reduce their income.

It fell to independent promoters to propose a more direct route, and after some false starts the Portsmouth Railway was authorised by the Portsmouth Railway Act 1853 (16 & 17 Vict. c. xcix). It was to run from Godalming to Havant, making use of the LBSCR line into Portsmouth at the southern end, and finding a sponsor at the Godalming end to give access to London. This proved to be difficult, but at length the LSWR decided to adopt the unwanted line, if only to prevent rival companies from taking it on. The LSWR leased the Portsmouth Railway from August 1858. The Portsmouth Railway was completed at the end of 1858 and due to open fully on 1 January 1859, forming (with other lines) a through route from London to Havant, where it was connected to the LBSCR route. The Portsmouth Railway's route became known as the Portsmouth Direct Line.

Although running powers to Portsmouth over the LBSCR had been granted to the Portsmouth Railway in the Portsmouth Railway Act 1853, subject to conditions, the LBSCR decided to challenge the arrangement. Despite this the LSWR indicated that it intended to start through train operation on 28 December 1858 and a goods train was sent to Havant to exercise the right. The LBSCR removed a rail from the Portsmouth Direct connection and obstructed the running of the LSWR train. A stand-off took place for some hours, incidentally blocking the operation of LBSCR trains as well. Finally the LSWR train was withdrawn and the matter referred to legal decision.

An unambiguous decision was not immediately conclusive, and it was not until 8 August 1859 that the LBSCR conceded the legal point and ordinary train running by the LSWR commenced. By this time the LSWR had acquired the Portsmouth Railway. The line through Woking, Guildford and Haslemere was known as the Portsmouth Direct Line.

=== Hayling Island ===
Feeling that the poor transport network serving Hayling Island, local interests promoted their own railway. At first the plan was to build across mud flats to the west of the island and reclaim considerable areas of land. This scheme was attempted but proved impractical. A branch line was finally built, opening on 16 July 1867. The line made a junction with the LBSCR main line at Havant. Through running was not normally carried out. The line was leased to the LBSCR in 1872 and operated as a branch line of that company.

== Improvements at Portsmouth ==
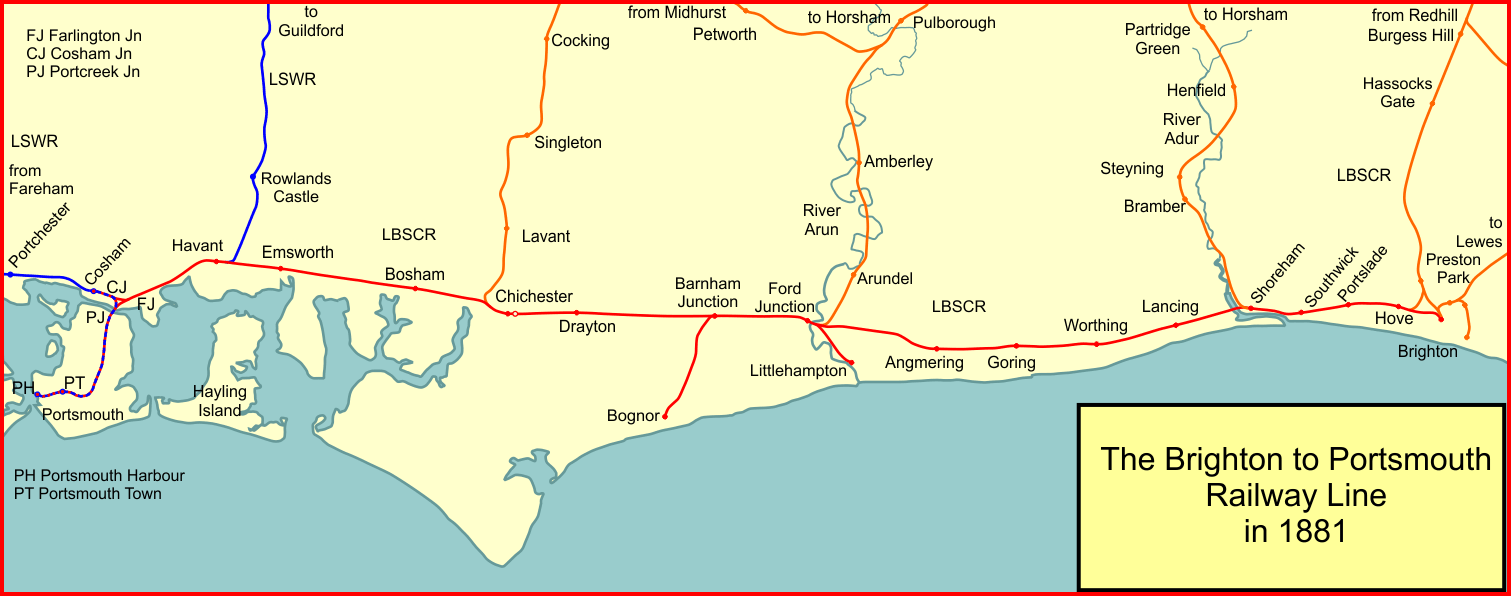
Portsmouth Harbour and most of the inland branches: 1881

Portsmouth station, in the present day named Portsmouth & Southsea station, was built as a simple terminus of the Brighton and Chichester Railway's extension. The lines on Portsea island became joint with the London and South Western Railway and the station was inadequate for the growing traffic. In 1866 the LBSCR extended the station with additional platforms and new buildings.

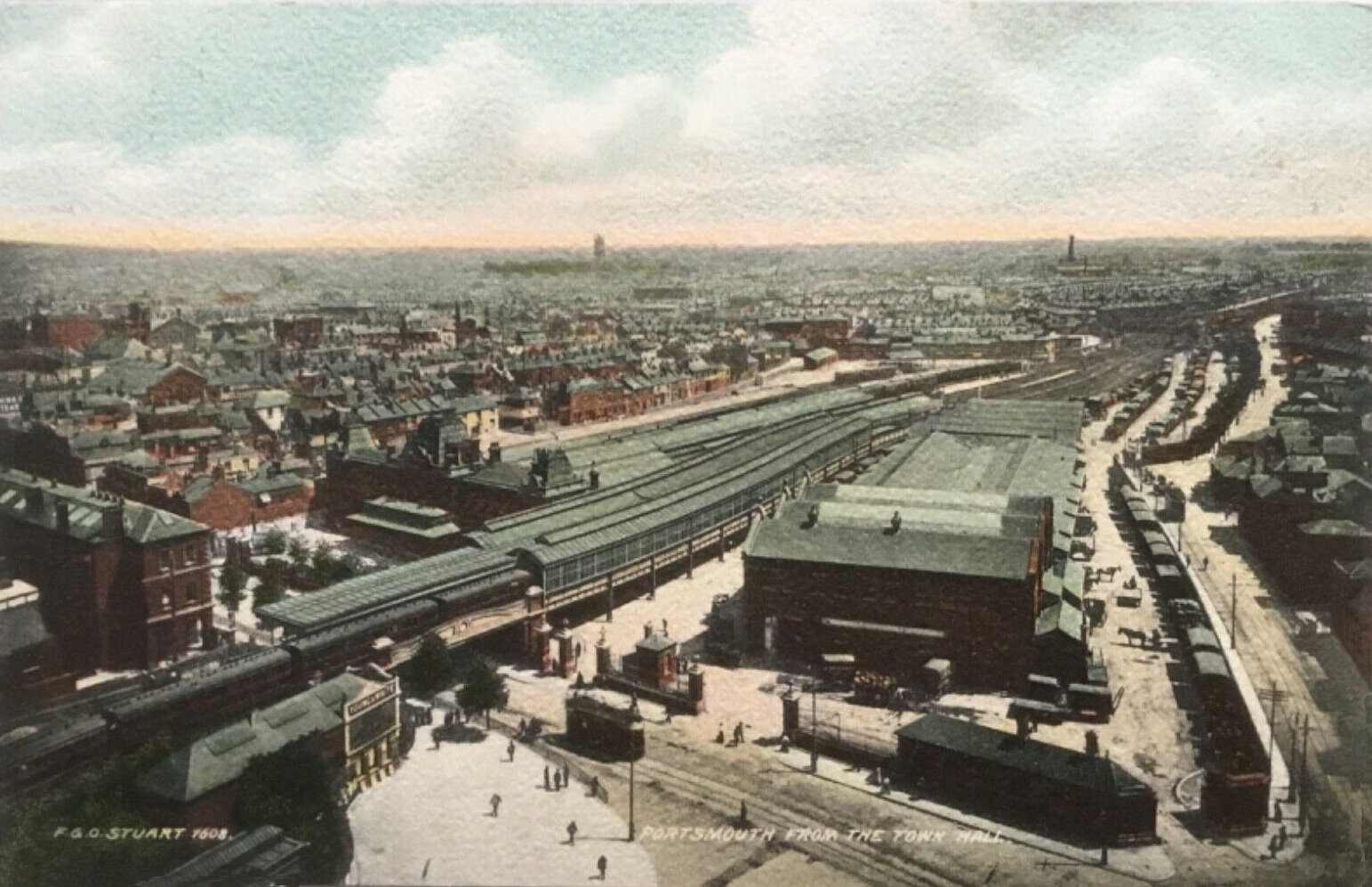
Portsmouth Town station, with the extension to Portsmouth Harbour at lower left and the line to Fratton at top right

The inconvenience for the heavy traffic for the Isle of Wight ferries, of having to use road transport from the Portsmouth station to the ferry berth, eventually prompted the LSWR and the LBSCR to collaborate in building an extension railway. It was authorised by the Joint Portsmouth Railway Extension Act 1873 (36 & 37 Vict. c. cxviii), and was known officially as The Joint Line. At just over a mile in length, it was to leave the existing line at the throat of Portsmouth station and climb past it on the south side, running at a high level to The Hard, forming a new landing stage there adjacent to the (Royal) Albert Pier, and a passenger station that came to be called Portsmouth Harbour. A branch line was to run from the approach to the harbour station, turning north across a swing bridge to Watering Island Jetty, for the use of the Admiralty, and not infrequently by royalty en route to Osborne House and elsewhere. The Harbour extension opened on 2 October 1876.

The existing Portsmouth station was renamed Portsmouth Town on the day of opening of the extension. There had been a horse-operated siding at the old Portsmouth station into the dockyard since about 1857, but the opportunity was now taken to construct a more modern access from the Joint Line at the high level Portsmouth Town station.

== Isle of Wight steamers ==
In 1880 the LBSCR and the LSWR jointly took over the operation of the ferry steamers between Portsmouth and the Isle of Wight, authorised by the South Western and the Brighton Railway Companies (Steam Vessels) Act 1879 (42 & 43 Vict. c. xxx) of 23 May 1879.

== Later branches ==
=== Cliftonville spur ===
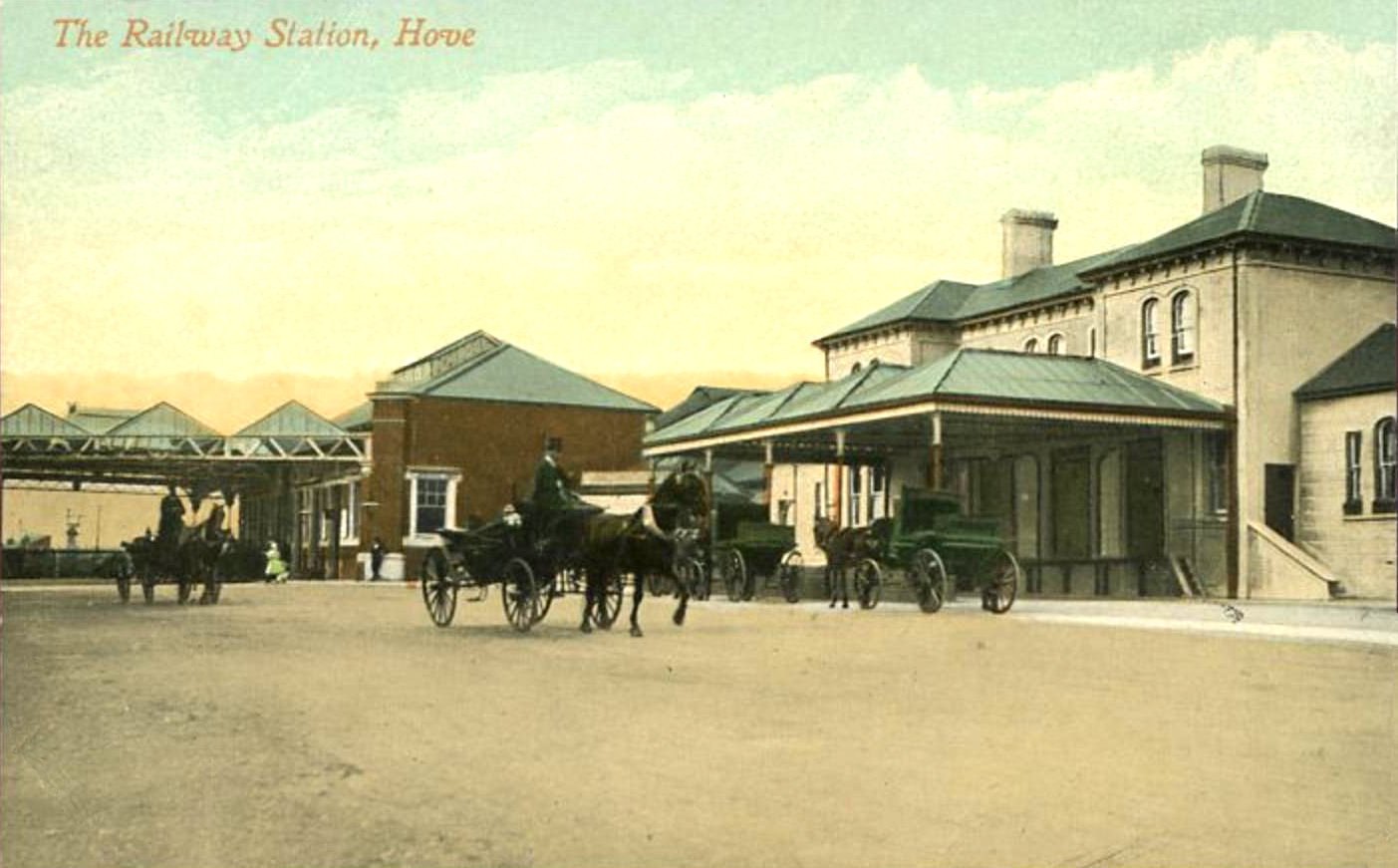
Hove station about 1900

The line from Brighton to Worthing and beyond could only be reached by reversal in Brighton station, and the development of that traffic generally, and of Hove as a residential district, motivated the LBSCR to build what became the Cliftonville Spur, a curve from Preston Park station to Hove. It was opened on 1 July 1879.

Preston Park station had been called simply Preston up to that time, but was renamed Preston Park from the same date. For many years, in fact until electrification, the spur was only used by passenger trains in peak periods.

=== Dyke branch ===
The Devil's Dyke is a natural declivity in the South Downs not far on the north-west side of Brighton. In the 1870s it had become an area of important leisure activity, and a railway to the place was considered desirable. The Brighton and Dyke Railway Company obtained Parliamentary authorisation to build such a line, branching from the LBSCR line at Dyke Junction, a little to the west of West Brighton station, later renamed Hove. The Brighton and Dyke Railway Act 1877 (40 & 41 Vict. c. clxxxix) was passed but progress in construction was slow and the line did not open until 1 September 1887. It was worked by the LBSCR although the company remained independent. The line rose steeply to the elevated beauty spot it served.

=== West Sussex Railway ===
The West Sussex Railway was a standard gauge light railway that ran from its own Chichester station south to Selsey. It was also known as the Hundred of Manhood and Selsey Tramway. It opened on 27 August 1897 and was operated by Colonel Stephens on the thinnest of budgets. As efficient road transportation developed in the 1930s the operation became unviable and it closed in January 1935.

=== Midhurst branch ===
Midhurst was an important centre in the rural area north of Chichester, and other railways had already reached it: the London and South Western Railway from Petersfield in 1860, and the LBSCR from Horsham and Pulborough in 1866. The LBSCR added a branch line from Chichester opening on 11 June 1881. Sugar beet was a significant traffic, and the line served Goodwood Racecourse.

=== East Southsea ===
Portsmouth station was not located conveniently for ferry passengers and goods. Clarence Pier had been operating since 1861, and to was located on the southern margin of Portsea Island, in contradistinction to the Portsmouth station towards the west. The opening of South Parade Pier in 1879 exaggerated the difficulty, as it operated both as a ferry terminal and a pleasure pier. Southsea was already enjoying a growth in leisure visitors and the new pier encouraged the growth considerably. The Portsmouth main line was not capable of being adapted to handle Southsea traffic, and this gave rise to the Southsea Railway.

The line was built from a new station on the Portsmouth main line, at Fratton, and the line and Fratton station opened in 1885. The course of the line was able to be taken around the conurbation of Portsmouth as it existed at the time.

Both the LBSCR and the LSWR operated trains to Portsmouth, and the two companies agreed to co-operate; the line was sold to the two companies jointly, and they operated it in alternate years. At the beginning of the twentieth century street tramcar competition cut heavily into the railway's business. In an attempt to reduce cost and enable more frequent operation, the company used steam railmotors.

In 1914 the line was not commercially viable and in accordance with a government directive, was closed.

== Railmotors and halts ==
In the first decade of the twentieth century the company decided on the use of railmotors, with intermediate halts, to develop local passenger traffic on the line between Brighton and Worthing. Road omnibus services were beginning to erode passenger business, with their advantage of more frequent stopping places. In this context the "railmotors" were small steam locomotives semi-permanently coupled to a single coach with a driving compartment at the non-locomotive end. In a comparative trial, petrol railcars were used on East Coast services from Brighton; the petrol units had serious reliability problems and were considered unsuccessful.

Halts were built at Holland Road (near the site of the original Hove station); at Dyke Junction; at Fishersgate, between Portslade and Southwick; at Bungalow Town, and at Ham Bridge. The services commenced on 3 September 1905, and were successful in building up the traffic. The single-coach train units were officially known as "motors", but later the phrase "push and pull" began to be applied to those instances where traffic justified a coach at each end of the locomotive; and eventually that phrase also became common for single-coach units.

The system was extended, and in 1906 and 1907 halts were built further west, at Lyminster, Fishbourne, Nutbourne, Southbourne, Warblington and Bedhampton.

== Grouping of the railways ==
The Railways Act 1921 made combination of most of the railways of Great Britain into four large new companies, in a process known as the "grouping". The LBSCR and the LSWR were part of the new Southern Railway from the beginning of 1923. The old rivalry was no more.

=== Twentieth century train services ===
In 1922 the LBSCR was in competition with the LSWR for London to Portsmouth Traffic. On a typical weekday there were three express trains from London Victoria to Portsmouth, advertised as Isle of Wight Expresses. Two if these had no intermediate stop between Victoria and Fratton, with a two-hour journey time to Portsmouth Harbour. The LSWR ran a much more frequent service on the Portsmouth Direct Line, taking four minutes longer from Waterloo.

Arundel station handled 15 through trains on weekdays, five on Sundays, and Brighton despatched 18 trains weekdays to Worthing and beyond, with an additional four on the line travelling from Haywards Heath via the Cliftonville Spur. Six westbound trains appear to terminate at Angmering. (Note: Care is needed in analysing train services in Bradshaw, as through trains and continuation of trains are not always made clear.)

In July 1938 both stages of the Portsmouth electrification had taken place. There was an intensive Portsmouth service on the Portsmouth Direct Line, with most trains taking 95 minutes. The former LBSCR services had settled down into serving Portsmouth by semi-fast trains, typically taking 2 hours 28 minutes from Victoria, on an hourly regular interval. Eight trains an hour left Brighton towards Worthing with one additional hourly train via the Cliftonville Spur. This was in most cases a train from Victoria to Littlehampton and Bognor Regis.

== Electrification ==
=== Brighton to West Worthing ===
The LBSCR together with the LSWR and the South Eastern and Chatham Railway, formed a new Southern Railway, as part of a process called the "Grouping", in 1923. The former LBSCR London suburban area had been operating electric passenger trains for some time, having converted from an overhead conductor to a third rail system. The electric trains were considered to be highly successful, and in 1930 it was announced that a main line electrification would be undertaken, reaching Brighton and West Worthing. The line voltage was 660 V DC.

A ceremonial inauguration took place on 30 December 1932, when a demonstration run from London to West Worthing using the Cliftonville spur took place. The full public service started on 1 January 1933, when as well as the fast London to Worthing trains there was a 15-minute interval service between Brighton and Worthing. Unstaffed halts had been provided on this section, but for the electric services they were staffed, basic accommodation being provided for the staff. At first the local trains were operated by former LSWR 1201 units, but soon 2-Nol units became available.

A halt at Bungalow Town, provided with wooden platforms, was located between Shoreham-by-Sea and Lancing, and had been closed on 1 January 1933. It was reopened on 30 September 1935 and renamed Shoreham Airport. It was intended to serve the new Brighton, Hove and Worthing Municipal Airport.

=== Electrification to Portsmouth ===
The result of the Brighton electrification encouraged the Southern Railway to consider other routes. The Portsmouth Direct Line was an obvious candidate, and its electrification became known as the Portsmouth No 1 Electrification Scheme. So far as the Portsmouth to Brighton line is concerned, it affected the line from Havant to Portsmouth Harbour. At Havant a much enlarged layout was provided with 800 foot platforms, through lines between, and a separate bay for the Hayling Island trains. The island platform at Portsmouth Town station (soon to be named Portsmouth & Southsea, was extended to 800 feet, and the layout at Portsmouth Harbour was extended to provide four of the five platforms the same length. The access to the Dockyard had to be relocated.

The first electric train to arrive at Portsmouth & Southsea was on 8 March 1937. Full public services started on 4 July 1937.

However the project was quickly expanded and Portsmouth No. 2 Electrification Scheme was authorised; this would extend from Worthing to Havant, and include the Mid-Sussex Line route from Dorking, as well as the Bognor and Littlehampton branches. The full public service on these lines began on 2 July 1938.

As part of the modernisation, the River Arun opening bridge was reconstructed as a fixed span; and the chain worked incline to Kingston Wharf was upgraded to a conventional incline capable of being worked by locomotives. This was commissioned in 1938.

== Branch line closures ==
The Dyke branch closed on 1 January 1939. On 2 November 1962 the Hayling Island branch was closed. This was followed by the closure of the line between Shoreham and Christ's Hospital, on 7 March 1966.

== Stations ==
=== Main line ===
- Brighton; opened 12 May 1840; renamed Brighton Central 1887; renamed Brighton 30 September 1935; still open;
- Hove; opened 12 May 1840; closed 1 March 1880; Holland Road Halt opened 3 September 1905 adjacent; closed 7 May 1956;
- Cliftonville; opened 1 October 1865; renamed West Brighton 1 July 1879; renamed Hove and West Brighton 1 October 1894; renamed Hove 1 July 1895;
- Dyke Junction; opened 3 September 1905; replaced 17 June 1932 by Aldrington, adjacent; still open;
- Portslade; opened 12 May 1840; closed 1 July 1847; reopened October 1857; renamed Portslade & West Hove March 1927; renamed Portslade 12 May 1980; still open;
- Fishersgate; opened 3 September 1905; still open;
- Southwick; opened 12 May 1840; still open;
- Kingston; opened 12 May 1840; closed 1879
- Shoreham; opened 12 May 1840; renamed Shoreham Harbour 1 July 1906; renamed Shoreham-by-Sea 1 October 1906; still open;
- Bungalow Town Halt; opened 1 October 1910; closed 1 January 1933; later intermittently used for air displays at Shoreham Airport;
- Lancing; opened 24 November 1845; closed 1 November 1847; reopened 7 March 1848; still open;
- Ham Bridge Halt; opened 3 September 1905; renamed East Worthing 23 May 1949; still open;
- Worthing; opened 24 November 1845; renamed Worthing Central 5 July 1936; renamed Worthing 4 March 1968; still open;
- West Worthing; opened 4 November 1889; still open;
- Durrington; opened 4 July 1937; still open;
- Goring; opened 16 March 1846; renamed Goring-by-Sea 1 April 1908; still open;
- Angmering; opened 16 March 1946; still open;
- Arundel; opened 8 June 1846; renamed Ford for Arundel 1850; renamed Ford Junction 1863; still open;
- Yapton; opened 8 June 1846; closed 1 June 1864;
- Barnham Junction; opened 1 June 1864; renamed Barnham or Barnham Sussex 14 February 1931; still open;
- Drayton; opened 8 June 1846; closed 1 June 1930;
- Chichester; opened 8 June 1846; still open;
- Fishbourne; opened 1 April 1906; still open;
- Bosham; opened 15 March 1847; still open;
- Nutbourne; opened 1 April 1906; still open;
- Southbourne; opened 1 April 1906; still open;
- Emsworth; opened 15 March 1847; still open;
- Denville; opened 1 November 1907; renamed Warblington December 1907; still open;
- Havant; opened 15 March 1847; still open;
- Bedhampton; opened 1 April 1906; still open;
- Farlington Junction;
- Farlington Race Station; opened 26 June 1891; intermittently closed when no races planned, and during World War I as ammunition storage point; opened for normal public operation 17 June 1928; closed 4 July 1937;
- Portcreek Junction;
- Hilsea; in use for workmen from October 1937; opened to public 2 November 1941; still open;
- Fratton; opened 2 July 1885; still open;
- Portsmouth; opened 14 June 1847; later renamed Portsmouth Town; renamed Portsmouth & Southsea 1 December 1921; still open;
- Portsmouth Harbour; opened 2 October 1876; still open.

=== Cosham branch ===
- Farlington Junction and Portcreek Junction;
- Cosham Junction;
- Cosham; opened 1 September 1848; still open.
