= Brighton and Chichester Railway =

UK railway line

The Brighton and Chichester Railway was an early railway in southern England running between the towns of Shoreham and Chichester in Sussex. It operated between 1845 and 1846.

== History ==
Brighton and Chichester Railway Act 1844
- Act of Parliament
- Parliament of the United Kingdom
- Long title: An Act for making a Railway from the Shoreham Branch of the London and Brighton Railway to Chichester.
- Citation: 7 & 8 Vict. c. lxvii

Dates
- Royal assent: 4 July 1844

Following the completion of the London and Brighton Railway (LBR) in 1841, with its branch line running to Shoreham, a natural extension appeared to be westwards towards Chichester and ultimately Portsmouth. A new company was therefore created in 1844 to build the first stage of such a line, which would then be operated by the LBR. The new company achieved approval in the Brighton and Chichester Railway Act 1844 (7 & 8 Vict. c. lxvii); construction began that same year.

== Construction ==
The new line involved constructing a viaduct at Shoreham and an opening bridge over the River Arun at Ford, West Sussex. The new line was opened in stages between November 1845 and June 1846.

- Shoreham – Worthing, November 1845
- Worthing – Littlehampton, March 1846
- Littlehampton – Chichester, June 1846

== Extensions ==
In August 1845 the company received approval in the Railway from Portsmouth to Chichester Act 1845 (8 & 9 Vict. c. cxcix) to continue their line to towards Havant and Fareham. Shortly afterwards the company was purchased by the LBR, but remained separate.

== Formation of LB&SCR ==
Construction of the extension to Havant was just commencing when the company ceased to exist when it was formally merged with others to form the London, Brighton and South Coast Railway (LB&SCR) by the London and Brighton Railway Act 1846 (9 & 10 Vict. c. cclxxxii) on 27 July 1846.
