= Lodsworth =

Village and parish in West Sussex, England

Coordinates: 51.00159°N 0.67983°W

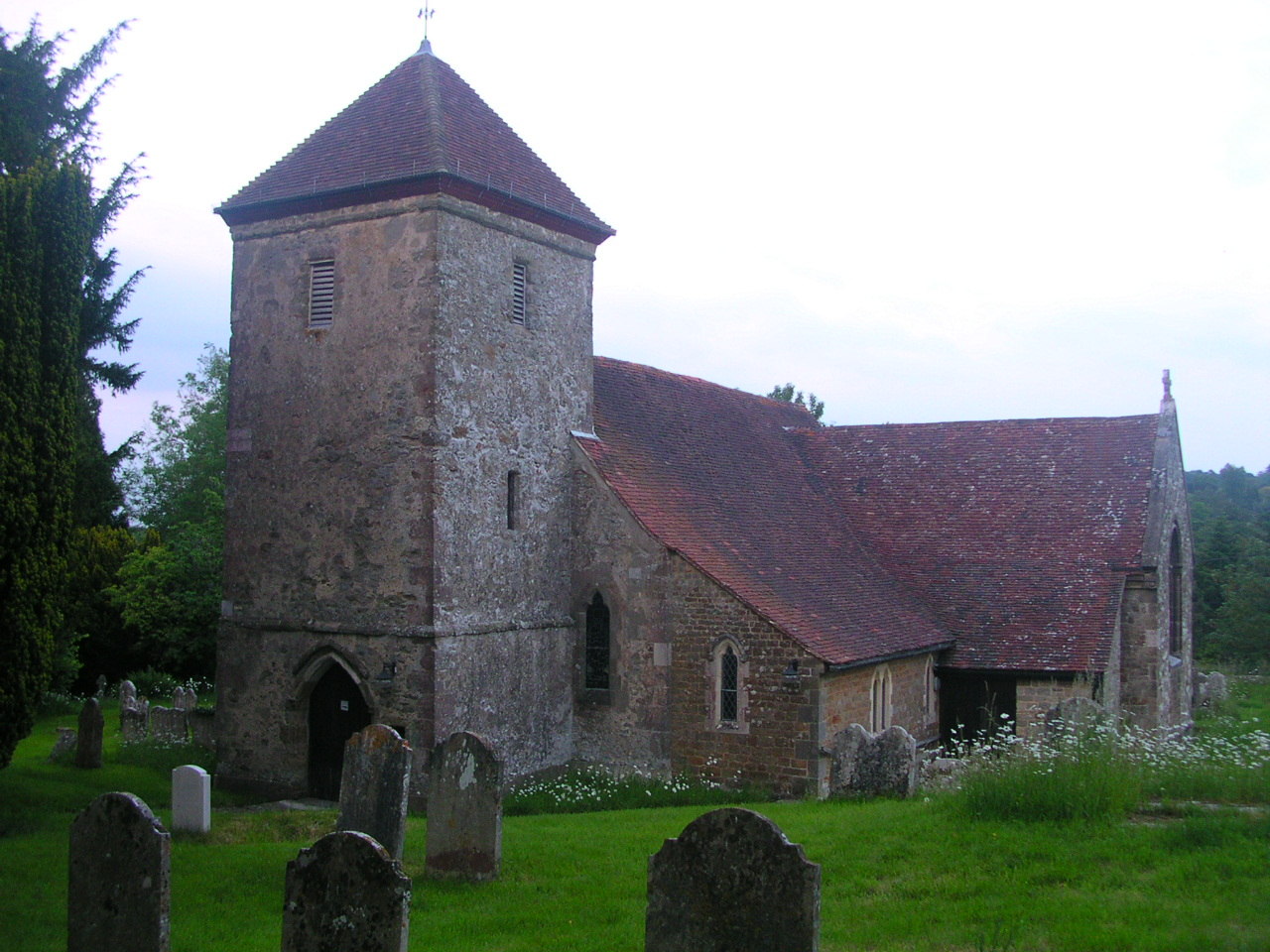
- St Peter's church

- Location within West Sussex
- Area: 12.46 km^{2} (4.81 sq mi)
- Population: 672. 2011 Census
  - Density: 55/km^{2} (140/sq mi)
- OS grid reference: SU927232
  - London: 42 miles (68 km) NE
- Civil parish: Lodsworth
- District: Chichester
- Shire county: West Sussex
- Region: South East
- Country: England
- Sovereign state: United Kingdom
- Post town: PETWORTH
- Postcode district: GU28
- Dialling code: 01798
- Police: Sussex
- Fire: West Sussex
- Ambulance: South East Coast
- UK Parliament: Chichester
- Website: http://www.lodsworth.org.uk/

Lodsworth is a small village, ecclesiastical parish and civil parish in the Chichester district of West Sussex, England. It is situated between Midhurst and Petworth, half a mile north of the A272 road. It lies within the South Downs National Park, just to the north of the valley of the River Rother; a tributary stream the River Lod runs close to the east end of the village.

The north end of the village is known as Smithbrook. The parish includes the settlements of Bexleyhill, Lickfold, Selham and Halfway Bridge.

== Geography ==
In the 2001 census, the parish covered 12.46 square kilometres (4.81 mi^{2}) and had 282 households with a total population of 690. 298 residents were economically active. The population at the 2011 Census (including Selham) was 672. The parish is a long thin strip running north to south, from the slopes of Blackdown in the north to Gallows Hill on the border with Graffham south of the River Rother. It includes the hamlet of Lickfold, with a pub beside the River Lod and a triangular green where the road to the top of Bexley Hill meets the Lodsworth to Haslemere road. South of the village there are more houses, a pub, and a small factory at Halfway Bridge on the A272.

It has a small Church of England parish church, Saint Peter's, a pub, the Hollist Arms, and a village hall. After nearly 20 years without a grocery shop, a group of villagers launched in 2007 a community-run shop, the Lodsworth Larder, built with ecological material to provide local products to local people.

== The Manor House ==
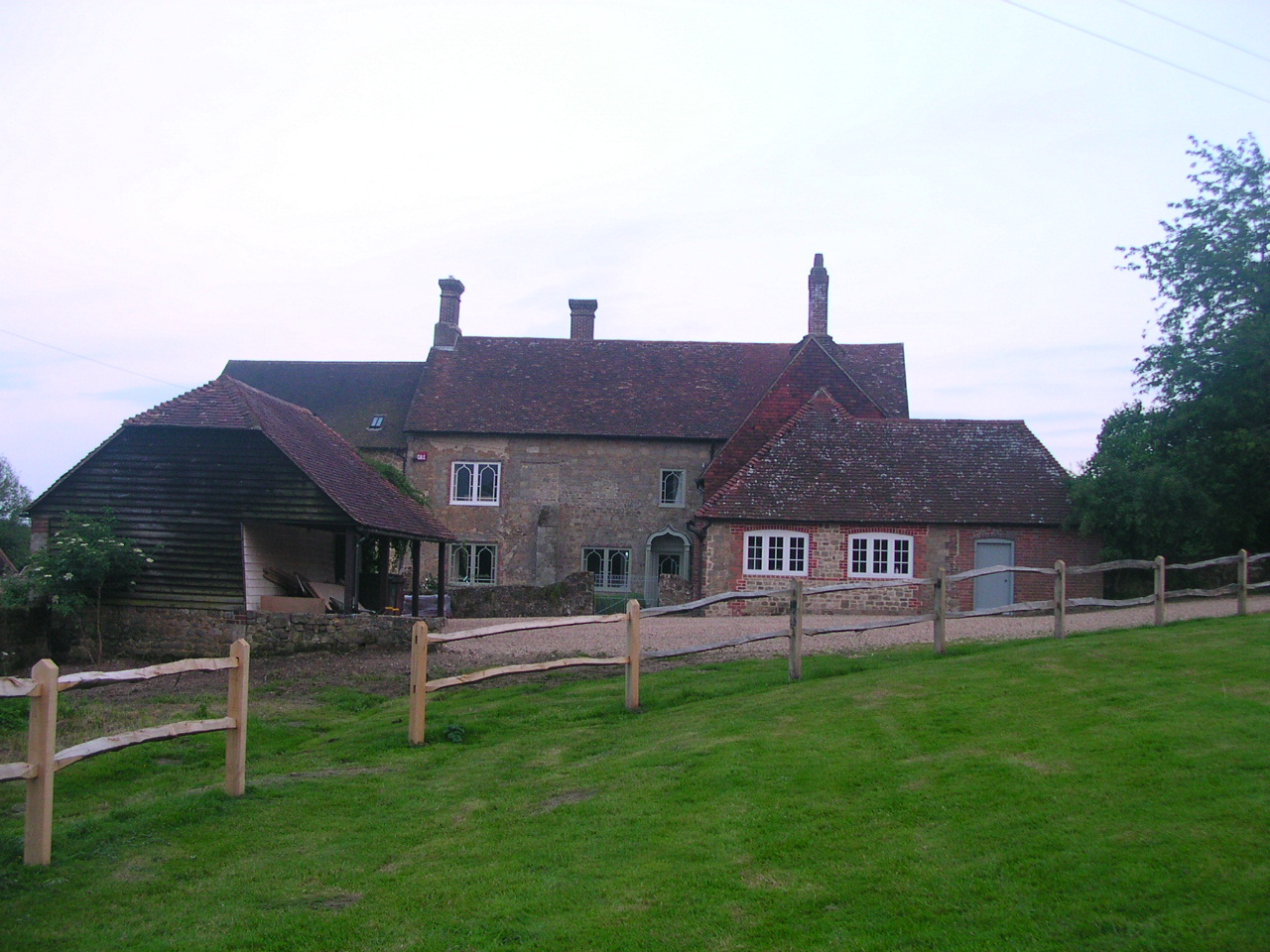
Lodsworth Manor House

Built by the Bishop of London, who owned the manor during the Middle Ages, when first built the Manor House would have been the finest building in Lodsworth. The present house is likely to have been the home of the Bishop's steward, who would have administered the manor. Manorial courts would have been held there and there was a basement dungeon to hold prisoners. The Manor was held as a liberty by the Bishop, making it independent of the county justice system, so even the most serious crimes would have been tried there, and executions would have been carried out at Gallows Hill on the border with Graffham. Archaeological work during the autumn of 2002 revealed the foundations of a 7-metre extension to the east of the building, with 1-metre foundations resting on solid rock which may have supported a tower. It is likely that there was a great hall to the south of the building.

== St. Peter's Well ==
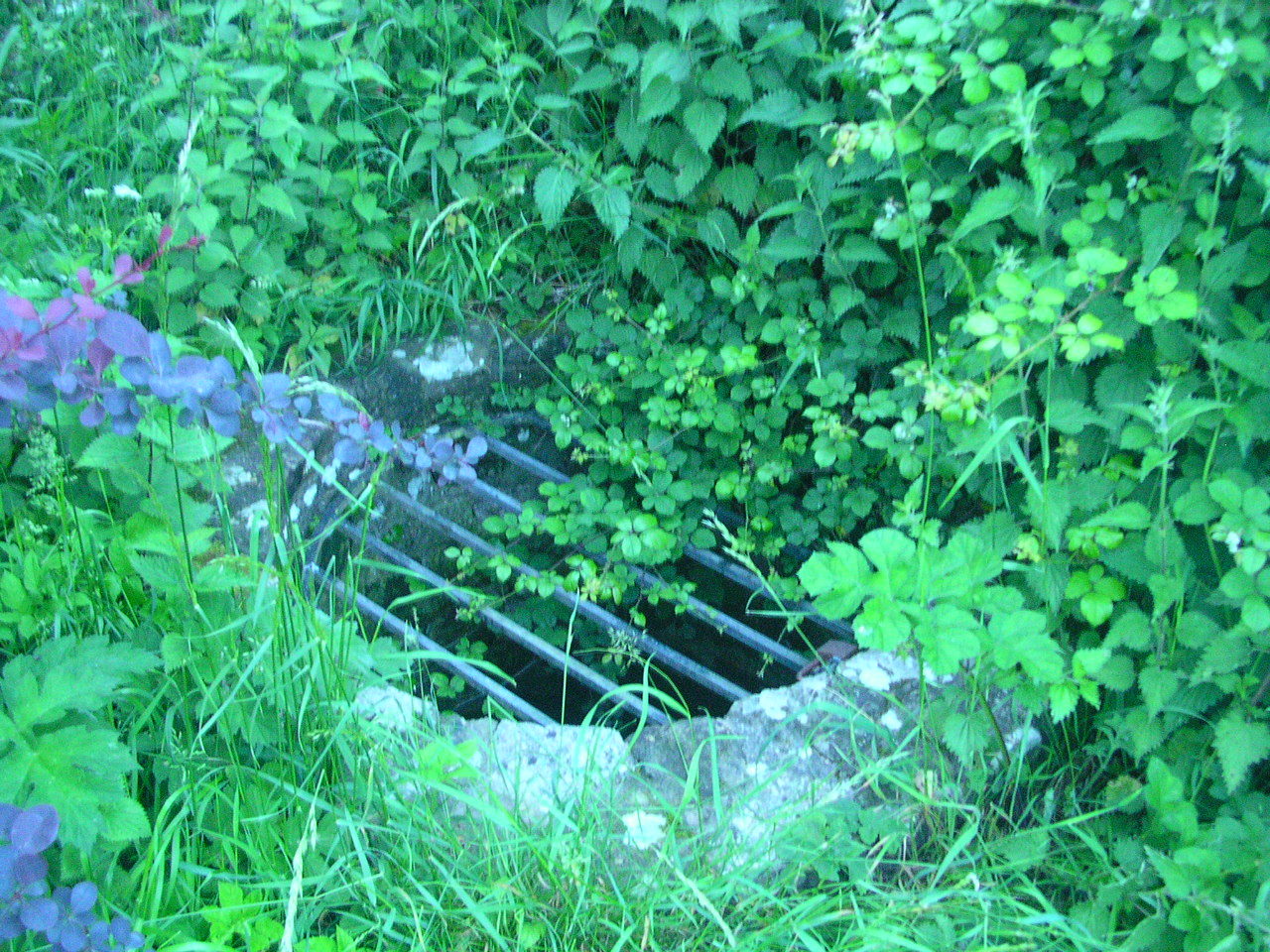
St Peter's Well in 2007

The spring near St Peter's church was a place of pilgrimage in the Middle Ages, especially for people with eye problems, and a source of revenue for the village. The well is located a few yards along a footpath that joins the lower junction of Church Lane and Vicarage Lane.

== History ==
The name Lodsworth is Anglo-Saxon meaning Lod or Loda's enclosure, but little is known for certain of the village until after the Norman Conquest of England in 1066, when the area was given to Robert de Montgomerie, Earl of Shrewsbury. There is no certain reference to Lodsworth in the Domesday Book of 1086, although it may have been regarded as part of Grittenham, now part of Tillington but then a much larger settlement. Lodsworth was part of the hundred of Easebourne, a Saxon administrative area.

In 1119, Richard de Belmas, the Bishop of London, was given the manor by the Montgomerie family; and Lodsworth was made a Liberty by Royal Charter of King Henry I. This unusual status made the manor independent from the county and hundred legal system so that even the most serious crimes were tried at the manorial court held at the manor house. The manor was run by the Bishop of London's representative the Sheriff who lived at the manor house. Villagers were exempt from tolls at markets and fairs in other parishes, and all income from the manor went straight to the bishop. The manor must have been a valuable source of income to the bishop with revenue from pilgrims to St. Peter's well and probably from stone quarrying, and the status of Liberty was vigorously defended and was reaffirmed by several kings, the last being Henry VI.

== Transport and industry ==
Agriculture and Forestry use most of the land area. There is arable cropping, dairying and other grazing livestock. There are large areas of chestnut coppice on Bexley Hill, cut in rotation to produce fence materials, and areas of oak and conifers.

There is a large timberyard and sawmill at Lodsbridge, south of Halfway Bridge and a small factory at the old watermill site at Halfway Bridge.

The first transport other than pack horses or horse carts was in 1795 when the Rother Navigation was built from Pulborough to Midhurst, allowing canal barges to reach the wharf at Lodsbridge. This was used mainly to bring chalk and coal in and to export timber. The railway line from Pulborough to Petworth was extended to Midhurst in the 1860s with stations at Selham and Midhurst.

== Notable residents ==
- Michael Baigent, author, historian.
- Austin Dobson, racing driver
- Sir Ranulph Fiennes, adventurer.
- David Mearns, shipwreck oceanographer.
- Ernest H. Shepard, illustrator of the Winnie the Pooh stories and The Wind in the Willows stories
- Barbara Ward, (Baroness Jackson of Lodsworth), economist, writer.

== Hamlets ==
Other villages and hamlets within the civil parish include:

- Bexleyhill
- Lickfold
- Selham
- Halfway Bridge
