= Petworth Canal =

Canal in West Sussex, England

Coordinates: 50°57′51″N 0°36′10″W

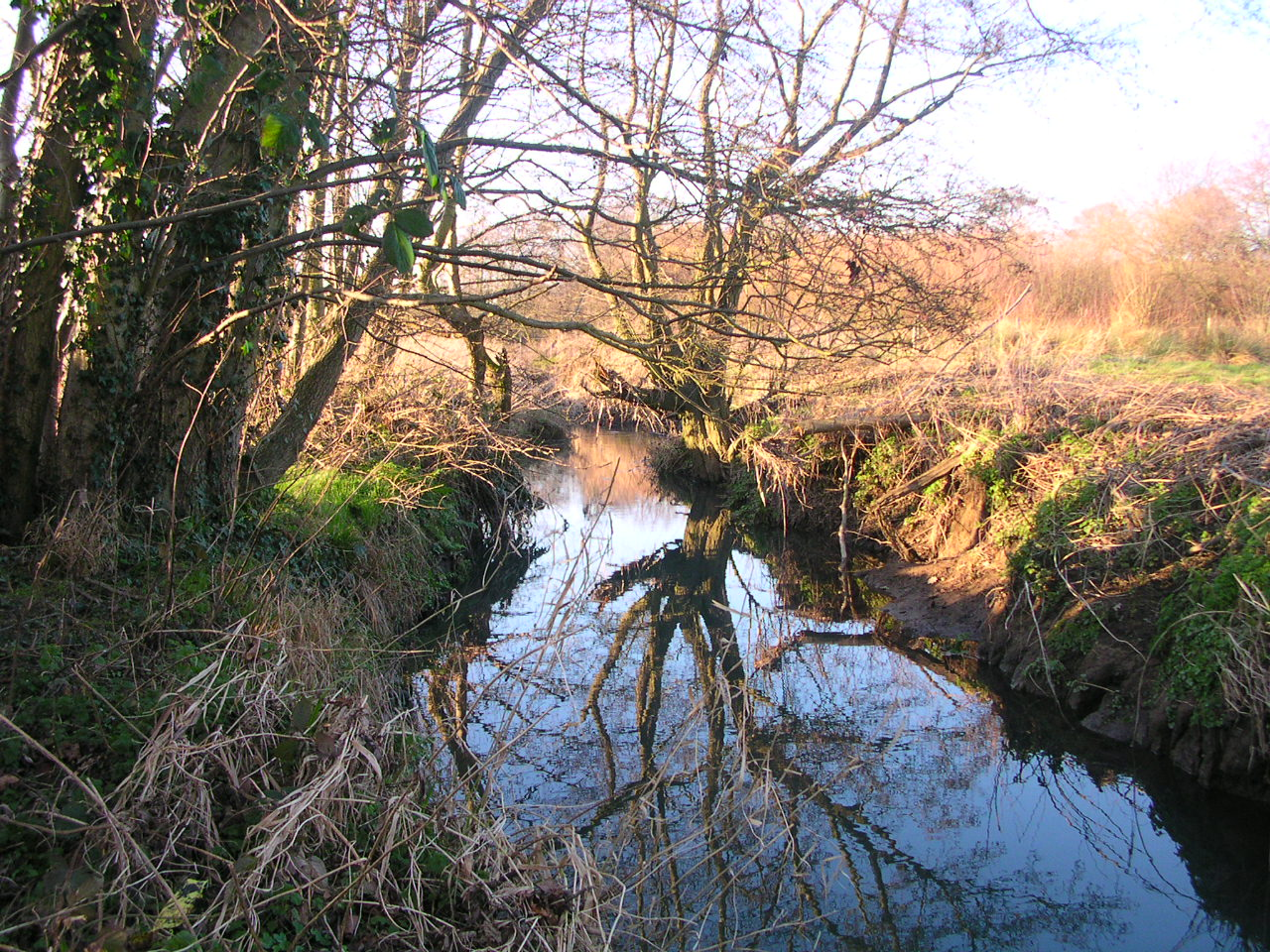
The canal near Haines Cottages

The Petworth Canal was one of Britain's shorter lasting canals, opened in 1795 and dismantled in 1826. Upon completion of the Rother Navigation, the Earl of Egremont used his estate workforce to build the 1¼ mile long canal from just upstream of the Shopham Cut to Haslingbourne, with two locks, each with a rise of 8 feet and 6 inches. The Haslingbourne Stream was diverted to provide the water supply, and still flows in the canal bed from Haslingbourne to the site of Haines Lock. The initial intention was to extend the canal through the Shimmings Valley to Hamper's Green on the north side of Petworth, then northwards to join the Wey Navigation at Shalford.

== Legal authority ==
Construction of the branch to Haslingbourne bridge was included in the River Rother Navigation Act 1791 (31 Geo. 3. c. 66), titled;

"An Act to enable the Earl of Egremont to make and maintain the River Rother navigable, from the Town of Midhurst, to a certain Meadow, called the Railed Pieces, or Stopham Meadow in the Parish of Stopham, and a navigable Cut, from the said River to the River Arun, at or near Stopham Bridge, in the county of Sussex; and for other Purposes."

== Construction ==
Digging began early in 1795, employing about twenty navvies. In August lock gates were being hung and a bridge built at Haines Lock. Sandstone from the nearest quarries at Fittleworth and Upperton would have been used for the bridges and locks. Coping stones are recorded as being barged from Todham and Moorland locks near Midhurst by Edmund Sayer. The navigation was open by October 1795.

== Plans for extension ==
The Earl of Egremont wanted a safe inland waterway that would link London on the River Thames with the south coast and the naval base at Portsmouth. Coastal shipping at that time faced serious hazards such as the notorious Goodwin Sands, where the Earl's own two-year-old brigantine Egremont was wrecked in 1797. During wars with France there were military dangers as well. The initial intention was to extend the canal through the Shimmings Valley to Hamper's Green on the north side of Petworth, then northwards to join the Wey Navigation at Shalford. Canal engineer William Jessop believed a route could be found past Northchapel, Shillinglee, Dunsfold and Alfold, then following the Cranleigh stream through Bramley to Shalford. A branch from Alfold to Horsham was also proposed. Agriculturalist Arthur Young advocated the scheme as a means to bring lime for the farms to improve their productivity. The Earl's estate surveyor Thomas Upton carried out a more detailed survey in 1793 and concluded that the 32 mile route would rise some 220 feet to cross the watershed into Surrey, with as many as nine locks needed just to climb 58 feet to the north side of Petworth. He suggested that a 17-mile extension of the Arun Navigation from Newbridge to the River Wey would be more practical. Even in that year when Canal Mania was at its height it was apparent that extension of the Petworth Canal could not be cost effective.

== Trade ==
The main products carried on the canal were chalk, coal and timber. Coal from Newcastle or South Wales was transferred from coastal ships into barges at Arundel. Chalk was barged up the River Arun from pits leased and operated by the Earl at Houghton and Amberley. Timber and all kinds of timber products, including charcoal and oak bark for tanning were barged out from the Peworth area, although there are few records of what passed through Haslingbourne. A lime kiln was operated at Haslingbourne wharf, and some lime barged down the canal. Most of the Petworth trade however went to Coultershaw wharf on the Rother navigation, which was further away from the town but was on the well maintained turnpike road to Chichester. There was no extra toll for using the Petworth canal but this also saved the barge masters having to travel through two locks. From east of Petworth it was often cheaper to cart goods to and from the River Arun, which was free of tolls below Pallingham, avoiding the Rother Navigation tolls payable on passing through Stopham Lock.

== Closure ==
Dredging was carried out in 1824 and the banks repaired, but when repairs to locks on the Rother navigation were urgently needed in 1826 the Earl decided to close the underused canal and reuse materials from the locks, which were completely dismantled that summer. This paid no regard to the landowner's legal duty to maintain the navigation. The cutting across the field below Haines Lock was then filled in.

== The canal today ==
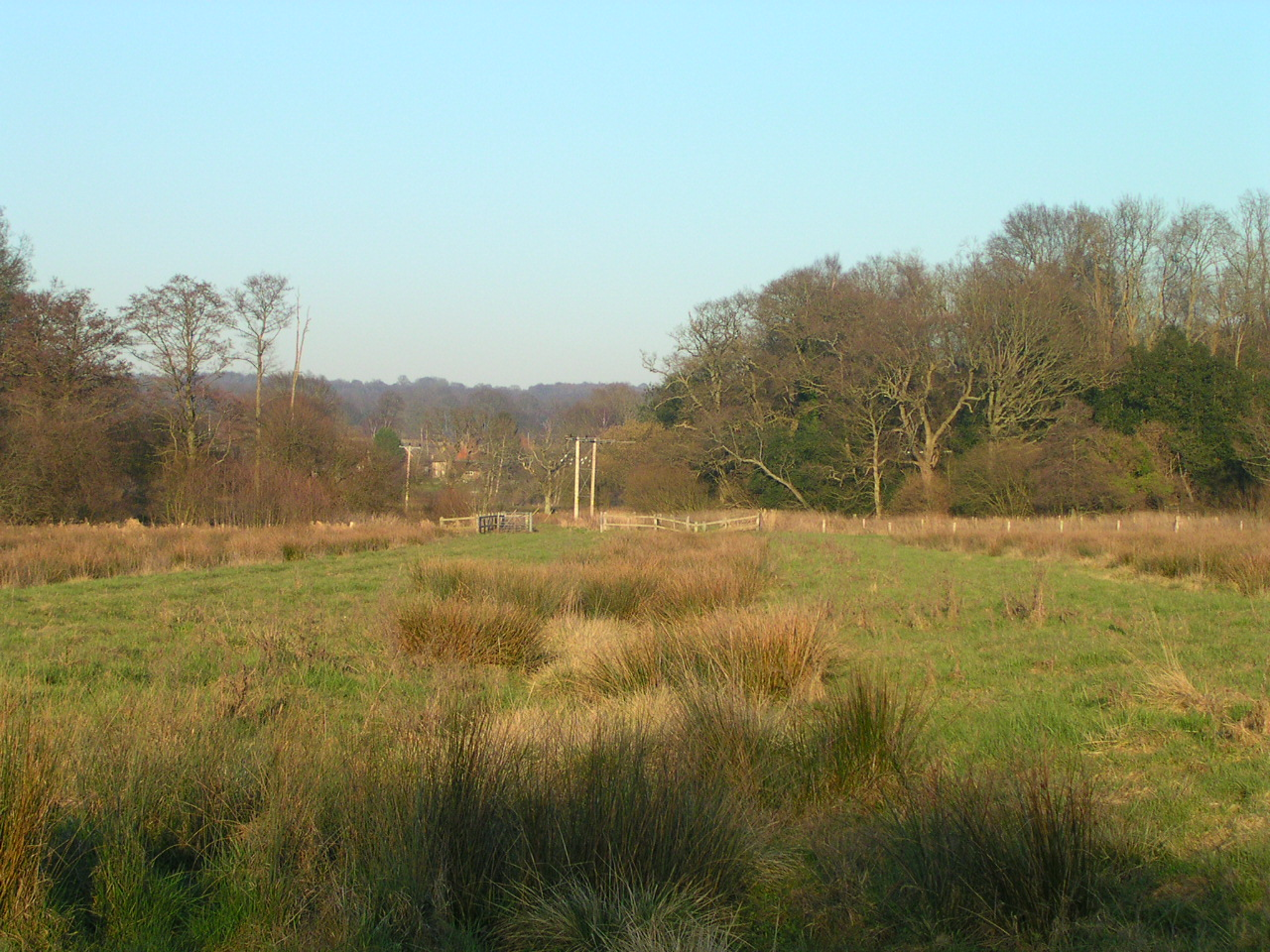
The canal channel on the Rother floodplain

The wharf at Haslingbourne has entirely disappeared and an electricity sub-station and a former water treatment plant, which pumped water from springs at the foot of Gore Hill to Petworth, are on the site. The area is now used for storage of construction machinery. Below Haslingbourne Cottages the stream flows in the canal bed which is cut through sandstone beds, creating a shaded artificial gorge rich in mosses and lichens. Emerging from this cutting at the site of Upper Lock the canal follows a straight course across low lying boggy ground, fenced off as a nature reserve area. Reaching the site of Haines Lock the stream can be heard pouring through a broken down weir in the undergrowth as it turns eastward into its natural course. The west bank of the canal here runs into the pasture for some twenty metres and the position of the levelled course beyond can just be discerned. Beyond the slightly higher ground here, as the Haslingbourne Stream again comes close to the canal, the embankments can be seen forming a straight line across the floodplain to the river. A pond near the river is the site of a weir and tumblebay.
