= Upper Town =

Upper Town or Uppertown may refer to:

== Canada ==
- Upper Town, a historic neighbourhood in Ottawa, Ontario

== Greece ==
- Upper Town (Thessaloniki)

== Ukraine ==
- Uppertown (Kyiv) or Old Kyiv

== United Kingdom ==
- Upper Town, Bonsall, a United Kingdom locations in Derbyshire
- Uppertown, Cumbria, a United Kingdom location
- Uppertown, Derbyshire, a settlement within Ashover
- Upper Town, County Durham, a United Kingdom location
- Upper Town, Herefordshire, a place in Herefordshire
- Uppertown, Highland, a United Kingdom location
- Upper Town, Hognaston, a United Kingdom locations in Derbyshire
- Uppertown, Northumberland, a United Kingdom location
- Uppertown, Orkney a place in Orkney
- Upper Town, Suffolk, a United Kingdom location
- Upper Town, Somerset, a settlement in North Somerset
- Upper Town, West Yorkshire, a United Kingdom location
- Upper Town, Wiltshire, a hamlet within Christian Malford

== United States ==
- Upper Town, California
- Upper Towns, in Cherokee history, a Cherokee residential region

== See also ==
- Places that translate to "Upper Town" in English:
  - Gornji Grad (disambiguation)
- Upperton (disambiguation)
