= George Eastman (disambiguation) =

George Eastman (1854–1932) was an American inventor.

George Eastman may also refer to:

- George Eastman (actor) (birth name Luigi Montefiori, 1942–2026), Italian B-movie actor and screenwriter
- USS George Eastman, a "Liberty-type" cargo ship
- George Eastman House, a photography museum
- George Eastman (cricketer) (1903–1991), English cricketer
- George Eastman, a character from the 1951 film A Place in the Sun
