= Upperton =

Upperton may refer to:

- Upperton, North Lanarkshire, Scotland
- Upperton, West Sussex, England
- Helen Upperton (born 1979), Canadian bobsledder

== See also ==
- Upper Town (disambiguation), including uses of Uppertown
