= Grittenham =

Grittenham may refer to more than one place in England:

- Grittenham in the parish of Brinkworth, Wiltshire
- Grittenham in the parish of Tillington, West Sussex
