= Lurgashall =

Village and parish in West Sussex, England

Coordinates: 51°02′10″N 0°39′59″W

- Village and civil parish
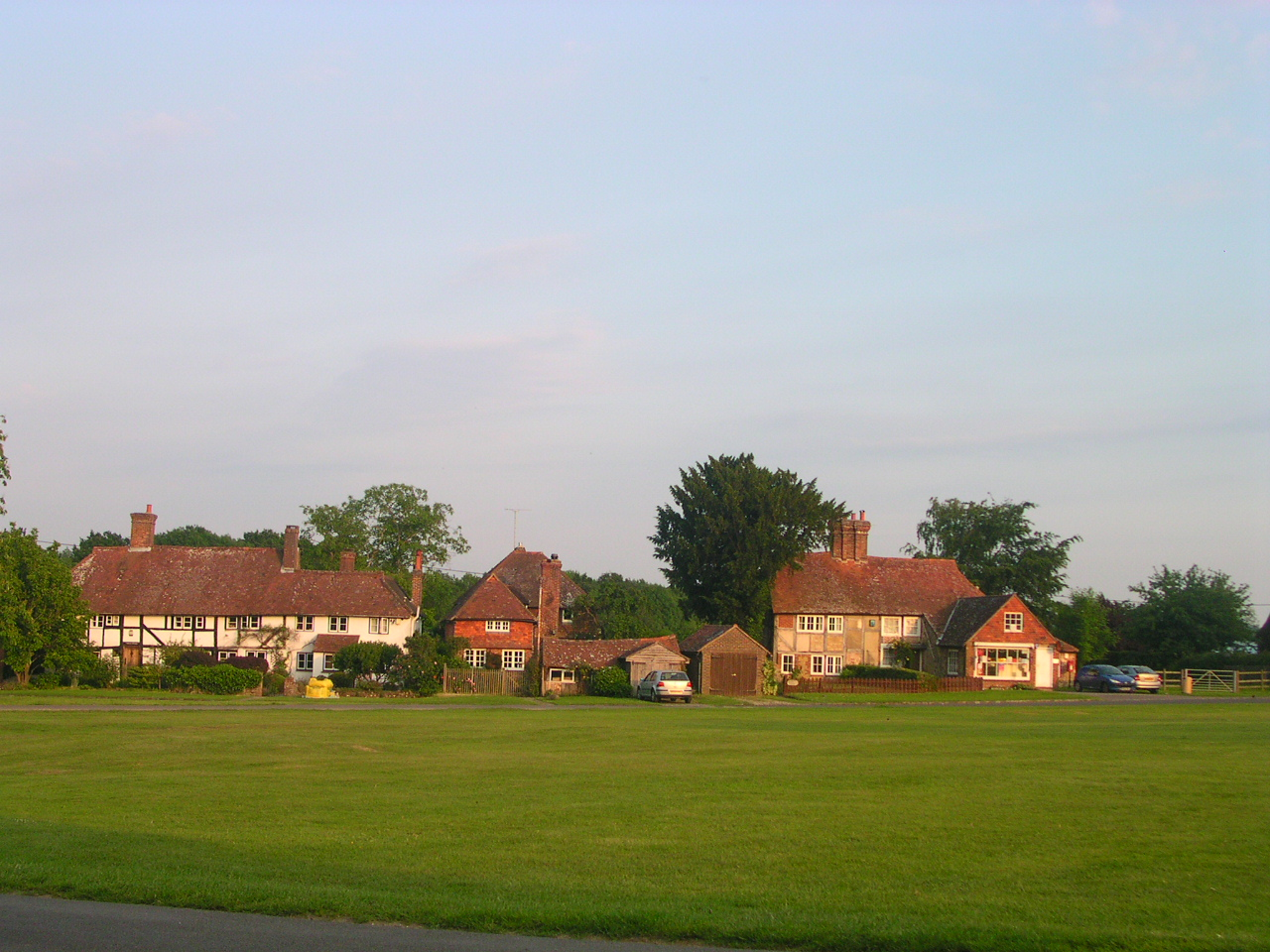
- Lurgashall Village Green

- Location within West Sussex
- Area: 20.97 km^{2} (8.10 sq mi)
- Population: 609 2011 Census
  - Density: 28/km^{2} (73/sq mi)
- OS grid reference: SU936271
  - London: 40 miles (64 km) NE
- Civil parish: Lurgashall
- District: Chichester
- Shire county: West Sussex
- Region: South East
- Country: England
- Sovereign state: United Kingdom
- Post town: PETWORTH
- Postcode district: GU28
- Dialling code: 01428
- Police: Sussex
- Fire: West Sussex
- Ambulance: South East Coast
- UK Parliament: Chichester
- Website: http://www.lurgashall.org/

Lurgashall is a village and civil parish in the Chichester district of West Sussex, England, 6.5 km (4 ml) north west of Petworth, just inside the South Downs National Park. It is situated on the River Lod, a tributary of the Rother. The population at the 2011 Census was 609.

== History ==
The parish church of St Lawrence is substantially 13th century with some evidence of Norman origins. It has had many additions over the years and at some point was used as the village school. It is a Grade II* listed building.

The village had become almost extinct in 1100, and finds no mention in the Domesday Book of 1086. After the Norman Conquest, the King gave the Lurgashall area to a Norman family called Alta Rippa, who built a Manor House there in about 1100. The Manor House itself has not survived but the area that the estate occupied is now Park Farm, which gets its name from the Deer Park which the Alta Rippa family established in about 1200. The coming of the Manor revived the village's fortunes and it grew in importance throughout the feudal period.

An account of what it was like to live in the village in the early part of the 20th century is given in the book A view of Edwardian Lurgashall by H. S. Roots. It was re-published in 2000 and is based on the memories of a child called Harold who came to the village aged four in 1899. His father was the headmaster of the village school for 10 years and the book is an account of Harold's time growing up in the village and giving accounts of rural life as it was then in what was a fairly isolated village on the northern outskirts of Petworth.

There was at one time a mill which has been transferred to the Weald and Downland Living Museum, leaving just the mill pond.

The Rev A. A. Evans wrote in A Countryman's Diary: "This was Lurgashall. have been to it several times since and with heightened appreciation... its beauty increases with familiarity, it endures, while the merely catchy and trivial wear away".

== Sports and leisure ==
Lurgashall cricket club plays on the village green, and is often the guest team at the Ebernoe Horn Fair. Some of the sheep's horn trophies won by highest scoring batsmen used to be displayed in the inn. There is a village hall for indoor activities such as bingo, parties and receptions. There is a football pitch to the south-east of the green.

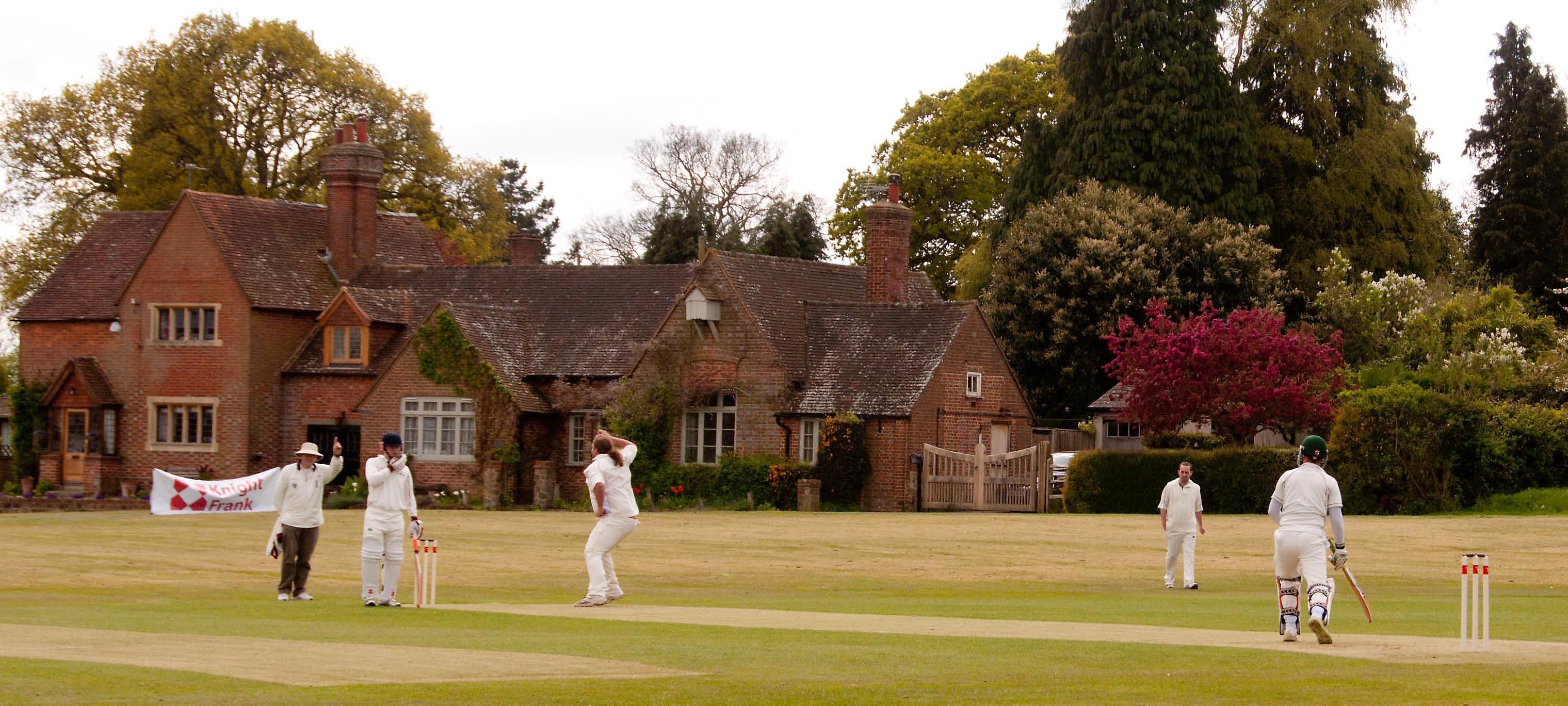
Lurgashall CC v Harting CC April 2014
