= River Lod, West Sussex =

River in north west Sussex, England

Coordinates: 50°59′0.64″N 0°40′6.84″W

River Lod
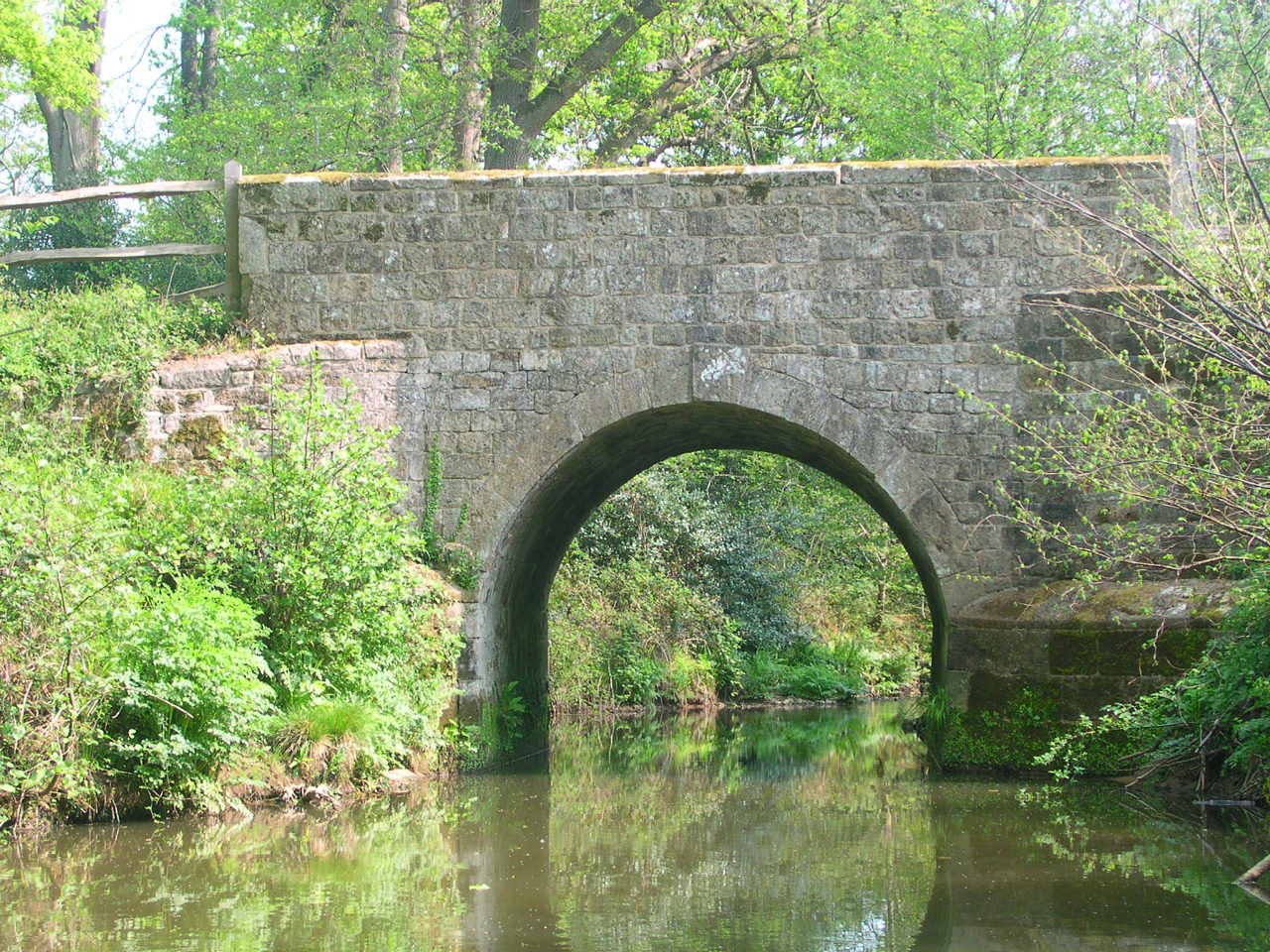
- Bridge over the River Lod at Lords Wood Barns dated 1779

Location
- Country: England

Physical characteristics
- Source: Marley Heights
  - location: Haslemere, Surrey
  - elevation: 140 m (460 ft)
- Mouth: River Rother
  - location: Lods Bridge
- Basin size: 52 km^{2} (20 sq mi)
- Discharge
  - location: Halfway Bridge
  - average: 0.58 m^{3}/s (20 cu ft/s)
  - minimum: 0.01 m^{3}/s (0.35 cu ft/s)7 September 1991
  - maximum: 41.5 m^{3}/s (1,470 cu ft/s)27 December 1979
- Water Body ID: GB107041012830

The River Lod is a short river draining about 52 km^{2} (20 sq mi) of north west Sussex. The main source is on the Greensand Ridge at Marley Heights near Haslemere, about 140 metres (460 ft) above sea level. From here it flows west past Lynchmere, then south to Furnace Pond, where iron cannon were cast during the English Civil War. It then turns south east, flowing south of Fernhurst to Lickfold and Lurgashall where it formerly powered Lurgashall Mill, now moved to the Weald and Downland Open Air Museum. From Mill Farm it heads south between high banks, which it only overflows after the heaviest of rainfalls, passing between the hills of Lodsworth and River to Halfway Bridge on the A272 road then joining the River Rother at Lods Bridge.

== North Park Furnace ==
Iron was produced by a blast furnace on the boundary of Fernhurst and Lynchmere parishes. Water to power the bellows was provided by an artificial lake covering about 2.5 hectares (6.2 acres) created by a dam on the river. There was also a higher pond 400 metres (1,300 ft) north-west of the furnace to provide a reserve supply as continuity of production is vital for a blast furnace.

== Lurgashall Mill ==
Another artificial lake between Lurgashall and Lodsworth supplied water to power Lurgashall Mill, producing flour. The mill is now operated at the Weald and Downland Open Air Museum at Singleton, also in West Sussex.

== Lords Wood Barns ==
Formerly named Lodge Farm the old barns on the east bank of the river by Lords Wood were converted into offices for Sofa Workshop Company in 1996, saving the older barn from imminent collapse. The east pier of the bridge had sunk several centimetres before the bridge was underpinned and repaired at that time to carry the newly built road through the wood from the Lodsworth to Lickfold road. The Serpent Trail long distance path crosses the river here.

== Water quality ==
The Environment Agency measure the water quality of the river systems in England. Each is given an overall ecological status, which may be one of five levels: high, good, moderate, poor and bad. There are several components that are used to determine this, including biological status, which looks at the quantity and varieties of invertebrates, angiosperms and fish. Chemical status, which compares the concentrations of various chemicals against known safe concentrations, is rated good or fail.

The water quality of the River Lod was as follows in 2016.

Section	Ecological Status	Chemical Status	Overall Status	Length	Catchment
Lod	Poor	Good	Poor	13.8 miles (22.2 km)	20.58 square miles (53.3 km^{2})

The reasons for the quality being less than good include sewage discharge and runoff of nutrients as a result of agriculture and land management.
