= List of United Kingdom locations: Upper I-Upper W =

The United Kingdom

This is part of the list of United Kingdom locations: a gazetteer of place names in the United Kingdom showing each place's locality and geographical coordinates.

== Upper I-Z ==
Location	Locality	Coordinates (links to map & photo sources)	OS grid reference
Upper Ifold	Surrey	51.08°N 00.57°W	TQ0033
Upper Inglesham	Swindon	51.66°N 01.71°W	SU2096
Upper Kenley	Fife	56.29°N 02.71°W	NO5611
Upper Kergord	Shetland Islands	60.28°N 01.27°W	HU4056
Upper Kidston	Scottish Borders	55.66°N 03.24°W	NT2242
Upper Kilchattan	Argyll and Bute	56.07°N 06.22°W	NR3795
Upper Kilcott	South Gloucestershire	51.59°N 02.30°W	ST7988
Upper Killay	Swansea	51.60°N 04.05°W	SS5892
Upper Kinsham	Herefordshire	52.27°N 02.93°W	SO3665
Upper Knockando	Moray	57.47°N 03.36°W	NJ1843
Upper Lambourn	Berkshire	51.51°N 01.55°W	SU3180
Upper Landywood	Staffordshire	52.64°N 02.03°W	SJ9805
Upper Langford	North Somerset	51.33°N 02.77°W	ST467594
Upper Langwith	Derbyshire	53.21°N 01.23°W	SK5169
Upper Largo (Kirkton of Largo)	Fife	56.21°N 02.93°W	NO4203
Upper Layham	Suffolk	52.02°N 00.95°E	TM0340
Upper Leigh	Staffordshire	52.92°N 01.98°W	SK0136
Upper Littleton	North Somerset	51.37°N 02.64°W	ST5564
Upper Loads	Derbyshire	53.21°N 01.53°W	SK3169
Upper Lochton	Aberdeenshire	57.06°N 02.51°W	NO6997
Upper Lode	Gloucestershire	51.99°N 02.17°W	SO8833
Upper Longdon	Staffordshire	52.72°N 01.92°W	SK0514
Upper Longwood	Shropshire	52.65°N 02.59°W	SJ6007
Upper Ludstone	Shropshire	52.55°N 02.29°W	SO8095
Upper Lybster	Highland	58.31°N 03.28°W	ND2537
Upper Lydbrook	Gloucestershire	51.83°N 02.58°W	SO6015
Upper Lyde	Herefordshire	52.09°N 02.74°W	SO4944
Upper Lye	Herefordshire	52.28°N 02.89°W	SO3965
Upper Maes-coed	Herefordshire	52.00°N 02.97°W	SO3334
Upper Marsh	Bradford	53.82°N 01.97°W	SE0236
Upper Midhope	Sheffield	53.48°N 01.68°W	SK2199
Upper Midway	Derbyshire	52.77°N 01.55°W	SK3020
Uppermill	Oldham	53.54°N 02.01°W	SD9905
Upper Milovaig	Highland	57.44°N 06.75°W	NG1549
Upper Milton	Somerset	51.22°N 02.66°W	ST5447
Upper Milton	Oxfordshire	51.85°N 01.63°W	SP2517
Upper Minety	Wiltshire	51.61°N 02.00°W	SU0091
Upper Moor	Worcestershire	52.12°N 02.04°W	SO9747
Upper Moor Side	Leeds	53.76°N 01.63°W	SE2430
Upper Morton	South Gloucestershire	51.61°N 02.50°W	ST6591
Upper Nash	Pembrokeshire	51.68°N 04.86°W	SN0202
Upper Neapaback	Shetland Islands	60.50°N 01.05°W	HU5280
Upper Netchwood	Shropshire	52.52°N 02.59°W	SO6092
Upper Newbold	Derbyshire	53.25°N 01.47°W	SK3573
Upper Nobut	Staffordshire	52.91°N 01.94°W	SK0435
Upper North Dean	Buckinghamshire	51.67°N 00.78°W	SU8498
Upper Norwood	West Sussex	50.94°N 00.67°W	SU9317
Upper Norwood	Croydon	51.40°N 00.08°W	TQ3369
Upper Ochrwyth	Caerphilly	51.59°N 03.11°W	ST2389
Upper Oddington	Gloucestershire	51.92°N 01.68°W	SP2225
Upper Ollach	Highland	57.34°N 06.14°W	NG5136
Upper Padley	Derbyshire	53.30°N 01.64°W	SK2479
Upper Persley	City of Aberdeen	57.18°N 02.18°W	NJ8910
Upper Pickwick	Wiltshire	51.43°N 02.21°W	ST8571
Upper Pollicott	Buckinghamshire	51.81°N 00.98°W	SP7013
Upper Poppleton	York	53.97°N 01.16°W	SE5554
Upper Postern	Kent	51.19°N 00.30°E	TQ6146
Upper Quinton	Warwickshire	52.11°N 01.75°W	SP1746
Upper Race	Torfaen	51.68°N 03.05°W	ST2799
Upper Ratley	Hampshire	51.00°N 01.54°W	SU3223
Upper Rochford	Herefordshire	52.30°N 02.55°W	SO6267
Upper Rodmersham	Kent	51.30°N 00.75°E	TQ9260
Upper Ruxley	Bexley/Bromley	51.41°N 00.15°E	TQ4970
Upper Sanday	Orkney Islands	58.91°N 02.80°W	HY5403
Upper Sapey	Herefordshire	52.26°N 02.47°W	SO6863
Upper Seagry	Wiltshire	51.51°N 02.08°W	ST9480
Upper Shelton	Bedfordshire	52.07°N 00.55°W	SP9943
Upper Sheringham	Norfolk	52.92°N 01.18°E	TG1441
Upper Shirley	City of Southampton	50.92°N 01.43°W	SU4014
Upper Shirley	Croydon	51.35°N 00.06°W	TQ3564
Upper Siddington	Gloucestershire	51.68°N 01.97°W	SU0299
Upper Skelmorlie	North Ayrshire	55.86°N 04.89°W	NS1967
Upper Slackstead	Hampshire	51.03°N 01.44°W	SU3926
Upper Slaughter	Gloucestershire	51.90°N 01.78°W	SP1523
Upper Solva	Pembrokeshire	51.87°N 05.21°W	SM7924
Upper Soudley	Gloucestershire	51.78°N 02.50°W	SO6510
Uppersound	Shetland Islands	60.14°N 01.19°W	HU4540
Upper Stanton Drew	Bath and North East Somerset	51.35°N 02.57°W	ST6062
Upper Staploe	Bedfordshire	52.21°N 00.33°W	TL1459
Upper Stoke	Coventry	52.41°N 01.48°W	SP3580
Upper Stoke	Kent	51.45°N 00.65°E	TQ8376
Upper Stoke	Norfolk	52.56°N 01.31°E	TG2502
Upper Stondon	Bedfordshire	52.00°N 00.34°W	TL1435
Upper Stowe	Northamptonshire	52.19°N 01.06°W	SP6456
Upper Stratton	Swindon	51.58°N 01.77°W	SU1687
Upper Street	Hampshire	50.96°N 01.78°W	SU1518
Upper Street (Southrepps)	Norfolk	52.87°N 01.34°E	TG2536
Upper Street (Sloley)	Norfolk	52.76°N 01.40°E	TG3024
Upper Street (Hoveton)	Norfolk	52.70°N 01.43°E	TG3217
Upper Street (Horning)	Norfolk	52.69°N 01.47°E	TG3517
Upper Street (Scole)	Norfolk	52.37°N 01.18°E	TM1780
Upper Street (Stansfield)	Suffolk	52.12°N 00.59°E	TL7851
Upper Street (Baylham)	Suffolk	52.11°N 01.06°E	TM1051
Upper Street (Stutton)	Suffolk	51.96°N 01.11°E	TM1434
Upper Strensham	Worcestershire	52.04°N 02.14°W	SO9039
Upper Studley	Wiltshire	51.30°N 02.23°W	ST8456
Upper Sundon	Bedfordshire	51.93°N 00.48°W	TL0427
Upper Swainswick	Bath and North East Somerset	51.41°N 02.36°W	ST7568
Upper Swanmore	Hampshire	50.94°N 01.17°W	SU5817
Upper Swell	Gloucestershire	51.93°N 01.75°W	SP1726
Upper Sydenham	Bromley	51.42°N 00.07°W	TQ3471
Upper Tankersley	Barnsley	53.48°N 01.48°W	SK3499
Upper Tean	Staffordshire	52.94°N 01.98°W	SK0139
Upperthong	Kirklees	53.56°N 01.80°W	SE1308
Upperthorpe	Derbyshire	53.31°N 01.31°W	SK4680
Upperthorpe	North Lincolnshire	53.49°N 00.87°W	SE7500
Upper Threapwood	Wrexham	52.99°N 02.83°W	SJ4445
Upper Thurnham	Lancashire	53.97°N 02.84°W	SD4554
Upperton	West Sussex	50.98°N 00.64°W	SU9522
Upperton	East Sussex	50.77°N 00.26°E	TQ6000
Upperton	Oxfordshire	51.64°N 01.06°W	SU6594
Upper Tooting	Wandsworth	51.43°N 00.17°W	TQ2772
Upper Town	Bradford	53.80°N 01.97°W	SE0234
Upper Town (Hognaston)	Derbyshire	53.05°N 01.65°W	SK2351
Upper Town (Bonsall)	Derbyshire	53.11°N 01.59°W	SK2758
Uppertown	Cumbria	54.99579°N 02.87508°W	NY4467
Uppertown	Derbyshire	53.17°N 01.52°W	SK3264
Upper Town	Durham	54.72°N 01.89°W	NZ0737
Upper Town	Herefordshire	52.13°N 02.61°W	SO5849
Uppertown	Highland	58.66°N 03.12°W	ND3576
Uppertown	Northumberland	55.04°N 02.22°W	NY8672
Upper Town	North Somerset	51.39°N 02.69°W	ST5266
Upper Town	Suffolk	52.26°N 00.81°E	TL9267
Upper Town	Wiltshire	51.51°N 02.04°W	ST9779
Upper Treverward	Shropshire	52.39°N 03.07°W	SO2778
Upper Tullich	Highland	57.72°N 04.13°W	NH7373
Upper Tysoe	Warwickshire	52.08°N 01.51°W	SP3343
Upper Up	Wiltshire	51.66°N 01.94°W	SU0496
Upper Upham	Wiltshire	51.49°N 01.68°W	SU2277
Upper Upnor	Kent	51.40°N 00.51°E	TQ7570
Upper Urafirth	Shetland Islands	60.48°N 01.45°W	HU3078
Upper Vobster	Somerset	51.23°N 02.43°W	ST7049
Upper Walthamstow	Waltham Forest	51.58°N 00.01°W	TQ3889
Upper Wardington	Oxfordshire	52.11°N 01.28°W	SP4946
Upper Wardley	West Sussex	51.04°N 00.80°W	SU8428
Upper Weald	Milton Keynes	52.02°N 00.83°W	SP8037
Upper Weedon	Northamptonshire	52.21°N 01.09°W	SP6258
Upper Welland	Worcestershire	52.05°N 02.33°W	SO7740
Upper Wellingham	East Sussex	50.89°N 00.03°E	TQ4313
Upper Welson	Herefordshire	52.15°N 03.03°W	SO2951
Upper Westholme	Somerset	51.15°N 02.61°W	ST5740
Upper Weston	Bath and North East Somerset	51.40°N 02.40°W	ST7267
Upper Weybread	Suffolk	52.36°N 01.27°E	TM2379
Upper Whiston	Rotherham	53.39°N 01.32°W	SK4589
Upper Wick	Gloucestershire	51.66°N 02.42°W	ST7196
Upper Wick	Worcestershire	52.17°N 02.26°W	SO8253
Upper Wield	Hampshire	51.13°N 01.11°W	SU6238
Upper Wigginton	Shropshire	52.90°N 02.99°W	SJ3335
Upper Winchendon	Buckinghamshire	51.81°N 00.92°W	SP7414
Upper Witton	Birmingham	52.52°N 01.88°W	SP0892
Upper Wolvercote	Oxfordshire	51.77°N 01.29°W	SP4909
Upper Wolverton	Worcestershire	52.14°N 02.13°W	SO9150
Upperwood	Derbyshire	53.10°N 01.56°W	SK2957
Upper Woodend	Aberdeenshire	57.26°N 02.56°W	NJ6619
Upper Woodford	Wiltshire	51.13°N 01.82°W	SU1237
Upper Woolhampton	Berkshire	51.39°N 01.18°W	SU5767
Upper Wootton	Hampshire	51.28°N 01.18°W	SU5754
Upper Wraxall	Wiltshire	51.46°N 02.28°W	ST8074
Upper Wyche	Herefordshire	52.08°N 02.33°W	SO7743
