= George Eastman (cricketer) =

English cricketer (1903–1991)

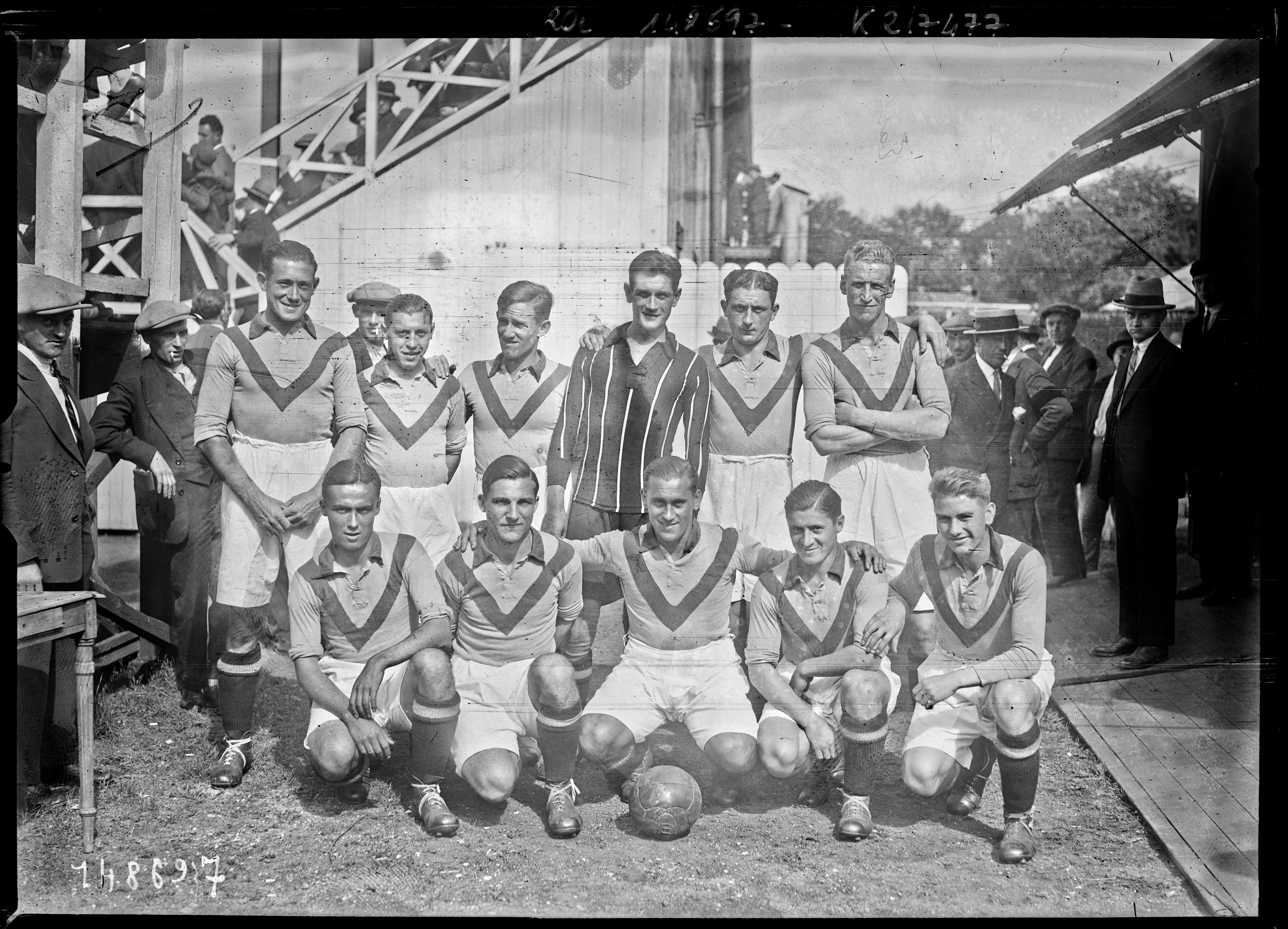

Personal information
- Full name: George Frederick Eastman
- Born: 7 April 1903; Leyton, Essex, England
- Died: 15 March 1991 (aged 87); Upperton, Sussex, England
- Batting: Right-handed
- Role: Wicket-keeper
- Relatives: Laurie Eastman (brother)

Domestic team information
- Years: Team
- 1926–1929: Essex

Career statistics
Competition	First-class
Matches	48
Runs scored	261
Batting average	6.86
100s/50s	–/–
Top score	34*
Balls bowled	–
Wickets	–
Bowling average	–
5 wickets in innings	–
10 wickets in match	–
Best bowling	–
Catches/stumpings	29/21
- Source: Cricinfo, 23 October 2011

George Frederick Eastman (7 April 1903 – 15 March 1991) was an English cricketer. Eastman was a right-handed batsman who played as a specialist wicket-keeper. He was born at Leyton, Essex.

Eastman made his first-class debut for Essex in the 1926 County Championship against Nottinghamshire. He made 47 further first-class appearances for the county, the last of which came against Surrey in the 1929 County Championship. In his 48 appearances he scored 261 runs at an average of 6.86, with a high score of 34 not out. Behind the stumps he took 29 catches and made 21 stumpings. With Roy Sheffield and Tom Wade queueing up to take the gloves, as well as being superior batsman, Eastman found himself forced out of the Essex team and left the county at the end of the 1929 season.

Outside cricket, Eastman played football for West Ham United F.C. in 1924–25 and 1925–26. He died at Upperton, Sussex on 15 March 1991. He was the brother of Essex all-rounder Laurie Eastman.
