= Upperton, West Sussex =

Hamlet in West Sussex, England

Coordinates: 50.996°N 0.6371°W

Upperton
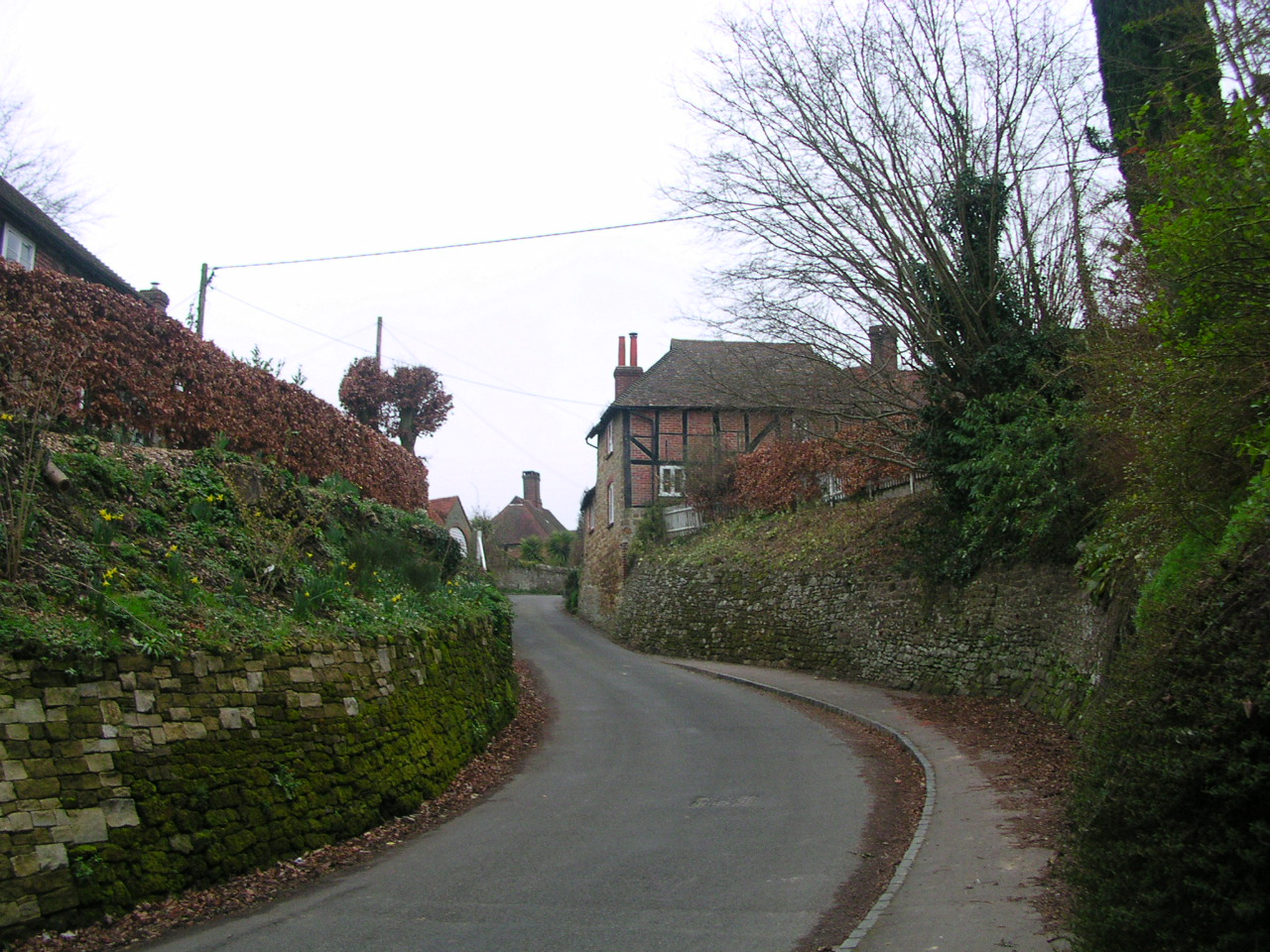

- Location within West Sussex
- OS grid reference: SU957227
- Civil parish: Tillington
- District: Chichester
- Shire county: West Sussex
- Region: South East
- Country: England
- Sovereign state: United Kingdom
- Post town: Petworth
- Postcode district: GU28 9
- Police: Sussex
- Fire: West Sussex
- Ambulance: South East Coast
- UK Parliament: Chichester

Upperton is a hamlet in the Chichester district of West Sussex, England. Part of Tillington civil parish it lies on the Tillington to Lurgashall road 1.4 miles (2.2 km) northwest of Petworth.

Upperton stands on a ridge of the lower greensand overlooking the Rother Valley, separated from Tillington by the cricket ground and a field. The stone wall of Petworth deerpark bounds the village on the eastern side, with a gate by the house at the southern end giving access to the public. To the west a number of public footpaths through fields, a vineyard and Upperton Common lead to the scenic Pitshill Park. The Serpent Trail hiking trail passes through the village from Pitshill Park to Tillington.

== History ==
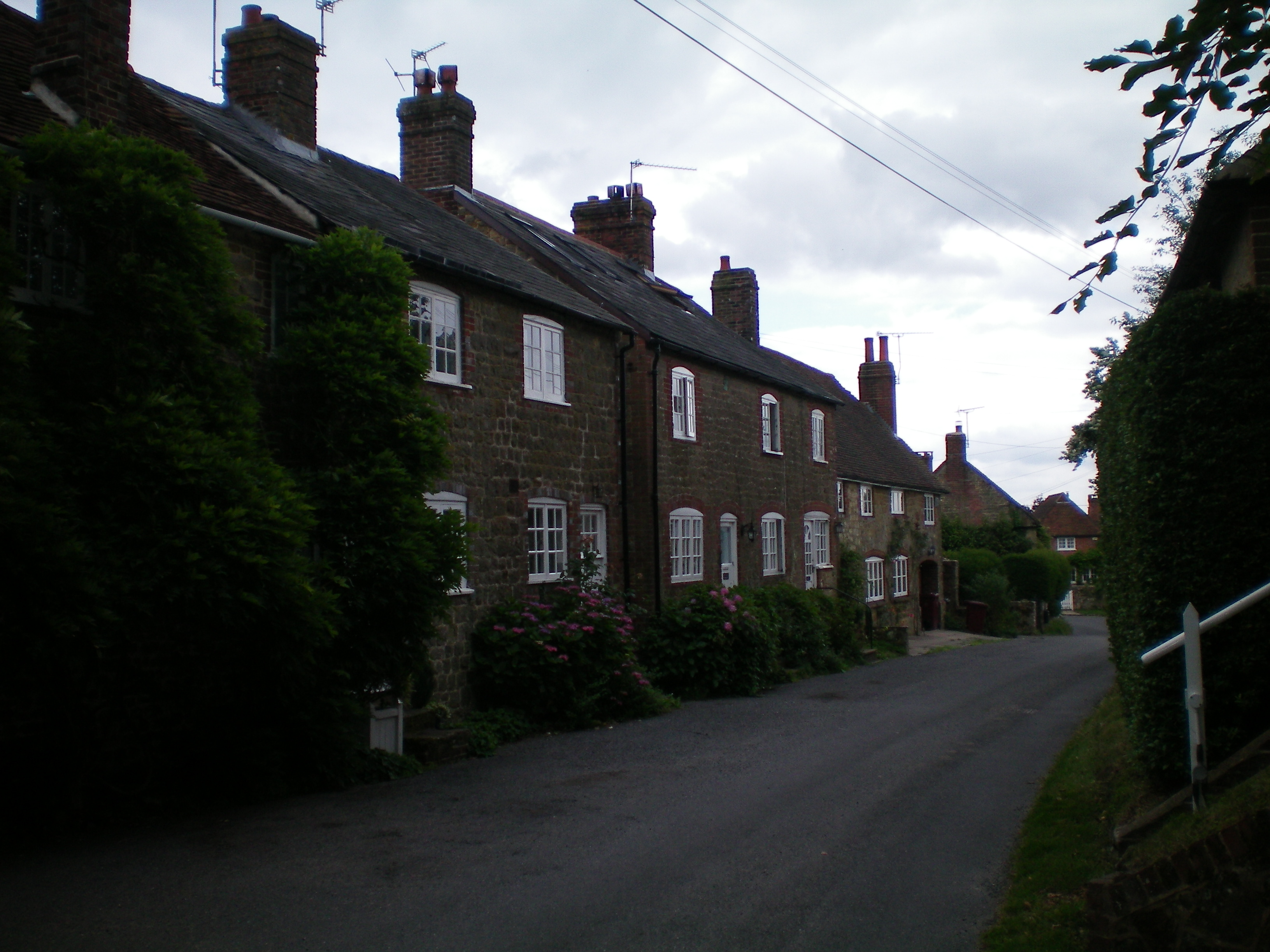
Upperton Street

In 1350 there is a recorded dispute between the Rector of Petworth and Hugh of Merton Rector of Tillington over tithes. Mention is made of the Abbot of Upperton, an otherwise unknown figure, showing that there was some sort of religious community in the village. During the sixteenth century A.D. a lot of common grazing land east of Upperton was illegally enclosed to make a deer park for Petworth House, causing impoverishment of the farmers of Upperton. This resulted in a long running legal case against the Earl of Northumberland, owner of Petworth, described by Peter Jerrome in his book Cloakbag and Common Purse. The "common purse" was a fighting fund raised by the tenants to fund legal action in the Chancery court; the "clokebagge well fraught with money" was a large bribe to the tenants' leader to drop the case, after first having had him press ganged into the army and sent to fight "beyond seas" which probably meant in Ireland, which he survived.
