= Tillington, West Sussex =

Village and parish in West Sussex, England

Coordinates: 50.98913°N 0.62975°W

Tillington
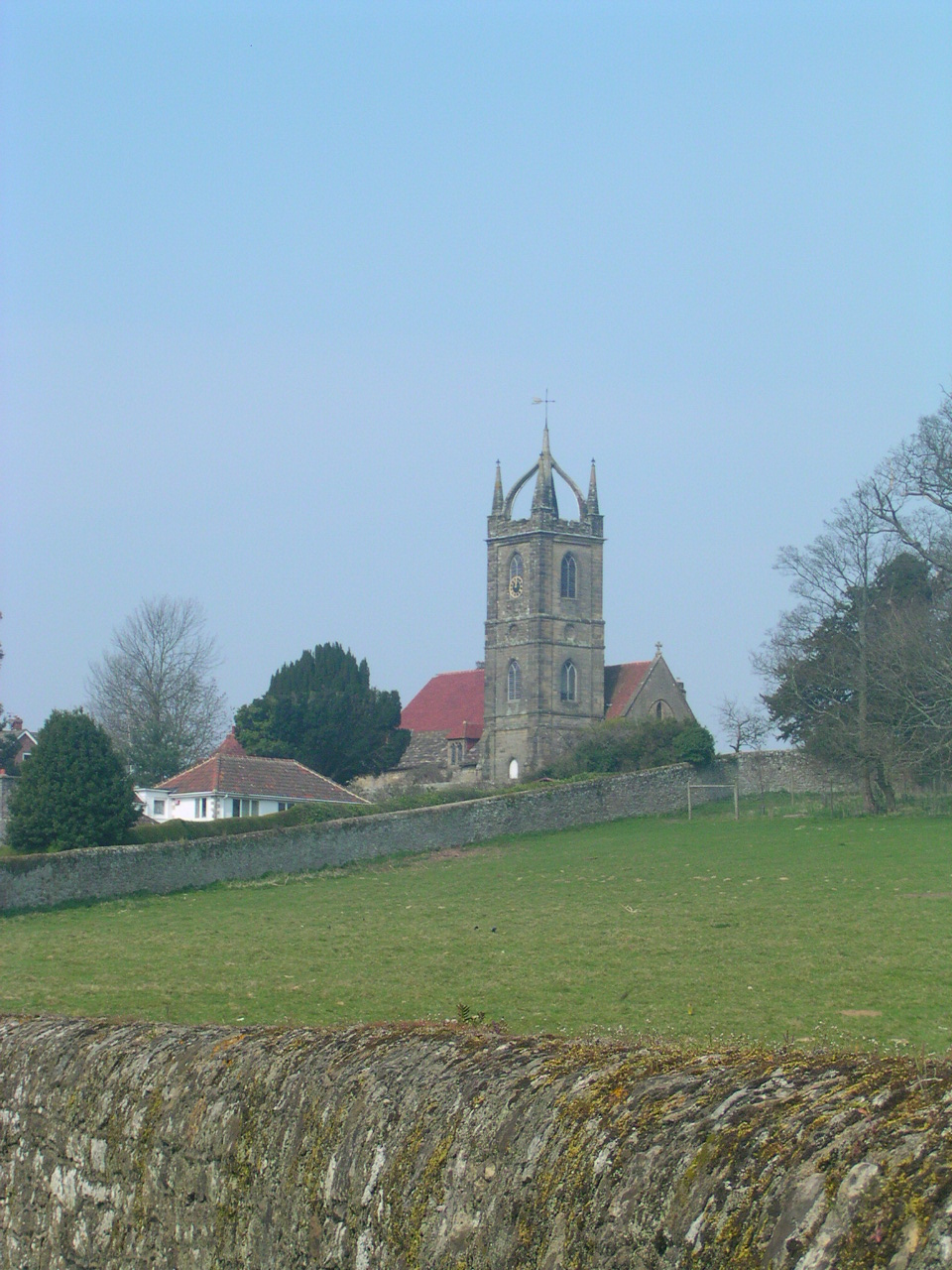
- All Hallows

- Location within West Sussex
- Area: 14.16 km^{2} (5.47 sq mi)
- Population: 501 2001 Census; 524 (2011 Census)
  - Density: 35/km^{2} (91/sq mi)
- OS grid reference: SU962219
  - London: 42 miles (68 km) NNE
- Civil parish: Tillington
- District: Chichester
- Shire county: West Sussex
- Region: South East
- Country: England
- Sovereign state: United Kingdom
- Post town: PETWORTH
- Postcode district: GU28
- Dialling code: 01798
- Police: Sussex
- Fire: West Sussex
- Ambulance: South East Coast
- UK Parliament: Arundel and South Downs
- Website: https://www.tillington.net/

Tillington is a village, ecclesiastical parish and civil parish in the District of Chichester in West Sussex, England, 1 mile (1.6 km) west of Petworth on the A272. The civil parish (CP) includes the hamlets of Upperton, River, and River Common. The land area of the CP is 1,416 hectares (3,500 acres); approximately 500 people lived in 227 households at the 2001 census.

Upperton and Tillington are designated Conservation Areas. There are many old dwellings, including medieval timber-framed houses, with one third of the buildings in the parish being grade II listed. Pitshill is a Georgian mansion standing at the head of a valley between Upperton and River. All Hallows Church with its unusual Scots crown tower is a landmark when approaching from Petworth, and is floodlit at night. It was painted by J. M. W. Turner and John Constable. The church, first recorded in 1100 was mostly rebuilt and enlarged between 1807 and 1837, but retains Romanesque sculpture and a plain eight-sided twelfth-century stone font.

Opposite the church is the historic Horseguards Inn, thought to get its name from the cavalry who stayed there overnight while escorting gold bullion from London to the navy at Portsmouth.

== History ==
The first reference to Tillington is in a title deed of 960, as Tullington, the farm or village founded by Tulla. Upperton (Upper Village) is first mentioned in 1191. Grittenham (Great Farm Enclosure), once a much larger settlement than today, is first mentioned in the Domesday Book, 1086, as Greteham, with 34 households, and resources including a mill. River (On the Slope) has also been called Treve through most of its history. Tillington itself was listed in the Domesday Book as in the ancient hundred of Easebourne as having 45 households: 21 villagers, 16 smallholders and 8 slaves; with woodland for pigs, ploughing land, meadows and a mill, it had a value to the lord of the manor of just over £8.

During the 16th century a great deal of common grazing land east of Upperton was illegally enclosed to make a deer park for Petworth House causing impoverishment of the farmers of Upperton. This resulted in a long running legal case against the Earl of Northumberland, owner of Petworth, described by Peter Jerrome in his book Cloakbag and Common Purse. The "common purse" was a fighting fund raised by the tenants to fund legal action in the Chancery court; the "clokebagge well fraught with money" was a large bribe to the tenants' leader to drop the case, after previously having had him press ganged into the army and sent to fight "beyond seas" which probably meant in Ireland, which he survived.

In 1861, the area of the Anglican parish was 3,766 acres (1,524 ha) with a population of 908.

== Geology ==
A sandstone ridge with an elevation of approximately 170 metres (560 ft) runs east to west across the centre of the parish, from Upperton to River. The north facing scarp slope falls steeply to the low weald where the soils are a mix of Weald Clay with alluvial soils.

== Economy ==
The northern part of the parish is well wooded, the farmland being a mix of pasture and arable. Ironstone deposits on the lower slopes of the escarpment have been quarried in the pre-industrial era leaving parts of River Common pitted and scarred, now overgrown by naturally regenerated broadleaved woodland. To the south of the sandstone ridge the land slopes gently down to the River Rother having very fertile free draining soils on greensand which are divided into large fields and mostly used for intensive vegetable production. Some of the upper slopes have recently been planted with grape vines.

== Wildlife ==
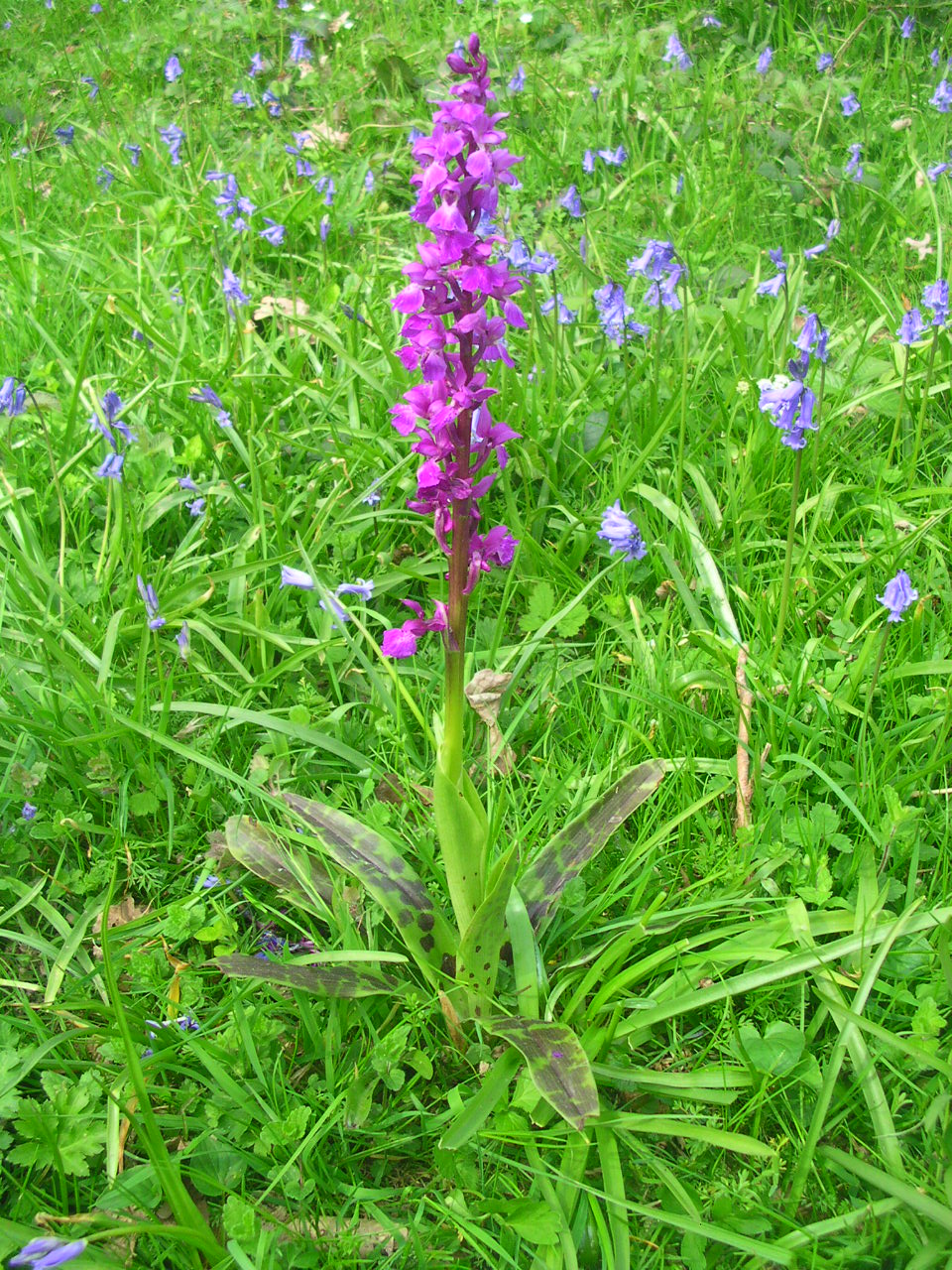
Early Purple Orchid

Acid sandy soils and neutral clay and loams provide a range of habitats, and there is some brookland adjoining the River Rother. There is no chalk. There is ancient grassland on River Common where glow-worms can be seen. Much of Petworth deer park with closely grazed ancient turf and numerous ant hills is within the parish boundary. The northern part of the parish has a diversity of small fields, hedges and woodlands supporting a wide range of species. Foxes, badgers, fallow deer and roe deer are plentiful. Muntjac deer are sometimes seen. Four species of reptile are present. Adders are found on the common and grass snakes throughout. Common lizards have been seen at River Common and Parkhurst Farm. Slow-worms are found in most places. Buzzards returned to the area several years ago and breed regularly. A full habitat survey of the parish is being undertaken.

== Sport and leisure ==
Tillington cricket ground on the southern edge of Upperton has fine views of the South Downs. There is a modern sports pavilion, adjoining hard tennis courts and a children's play area. Just north of the church and pub, Tillington Village Hall is a well equipped venue for meetings, indoor activities and parties.

== Governance ==
Tillington is governed by Tillington Parish Council. Council meetings are held every two months in Tillington Village Hall, normally on the last Monday evening of the month. The responsibilities include footpaths, the cricket ground and pavilion, tennis courts, children's play equipment and the assessment of planning applications. It has overall responsibility for the village hall, which is run by a management committee. The parish council has nine seats, with a four-year term, all uncontested in the May 2007 election. Three replacement councillors were co-opted.

The next higher level of government is the district council. The parish of Tillington lies within the Petworth ward of Chichester District Council which returns two members to the district council.

In parallel with the district is West Sussex County Council, with responsibility for Education, Libraries, Social Services, Civil Registration, Trading Standards and Transport. Elections for the County Council are held every four years.

The UK Parliament constituency for Tillington is Arundel and South Downs.

== Gallery ==
Some images of cavalry in the village.

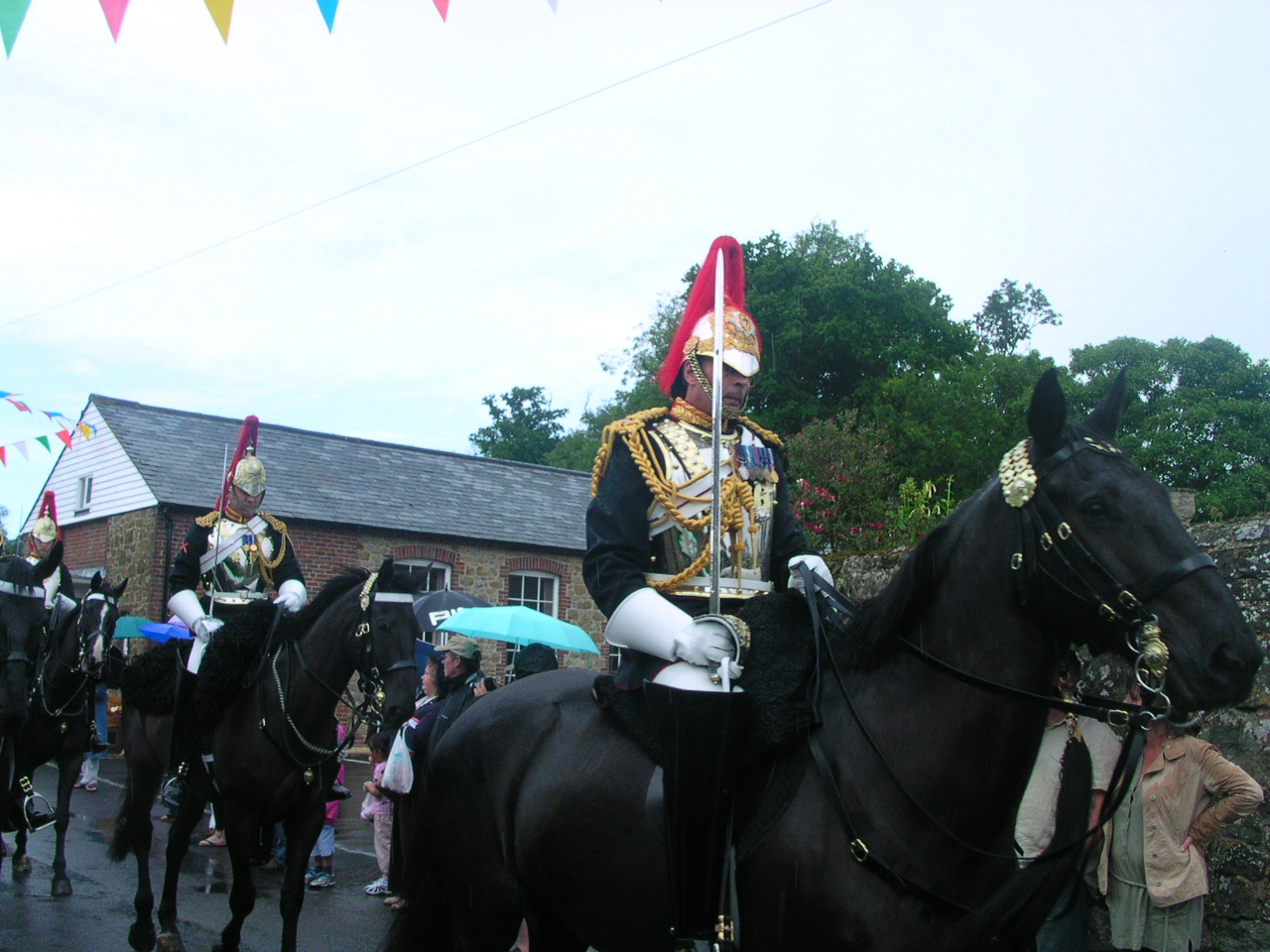
Household Cavalry parade through the village

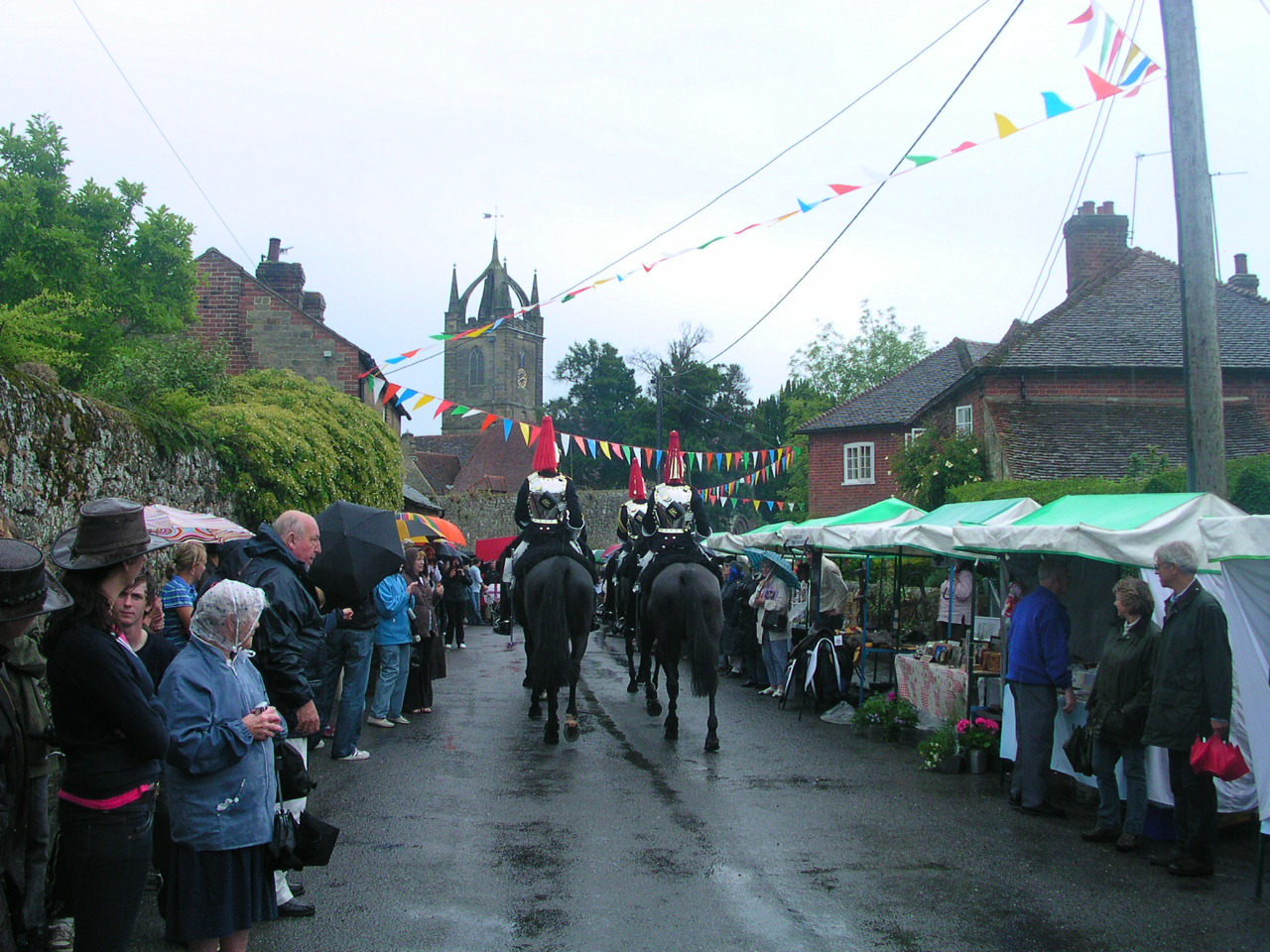
Returning to the causeway

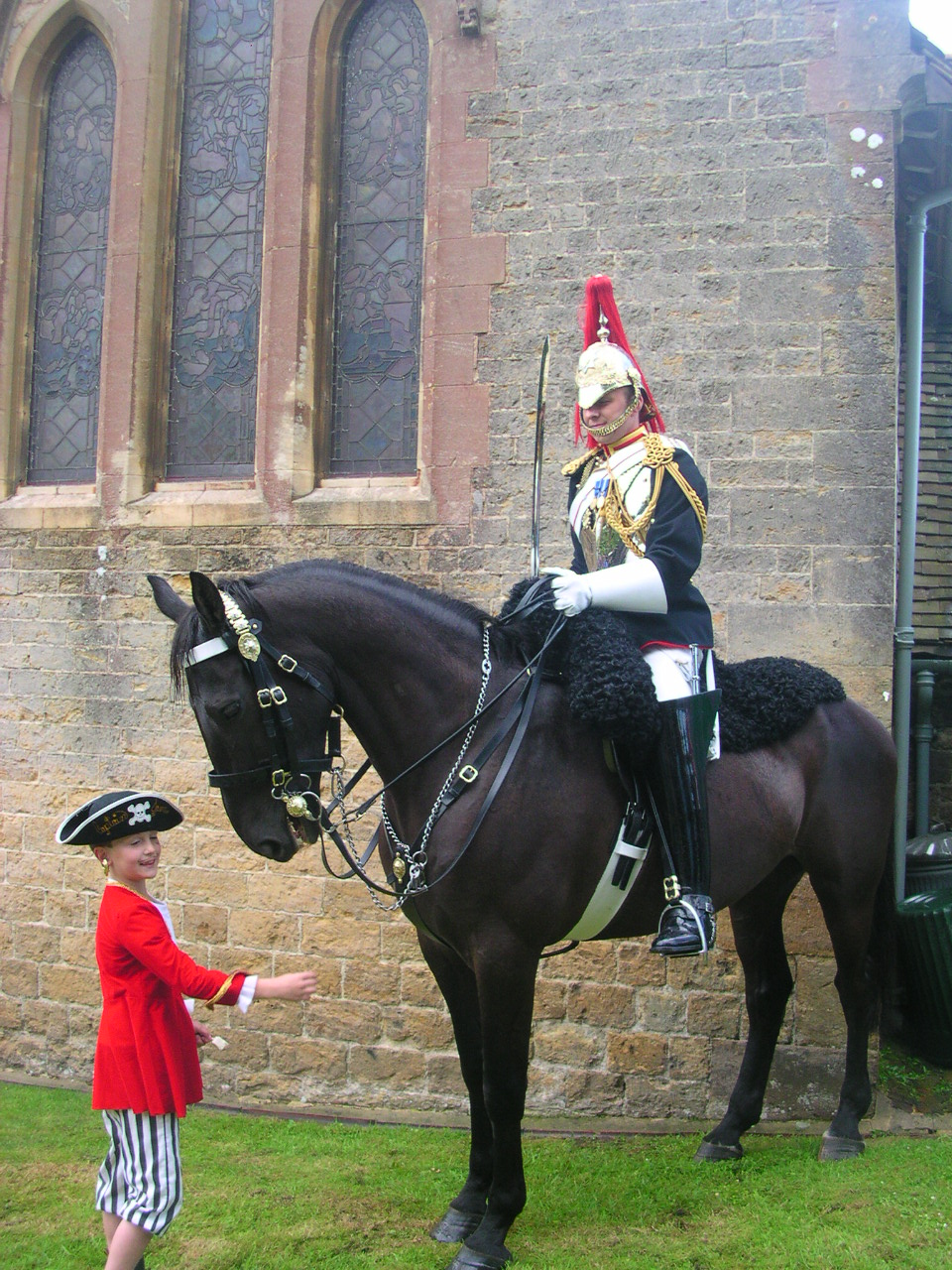
A Blues and Royals trooper at the church

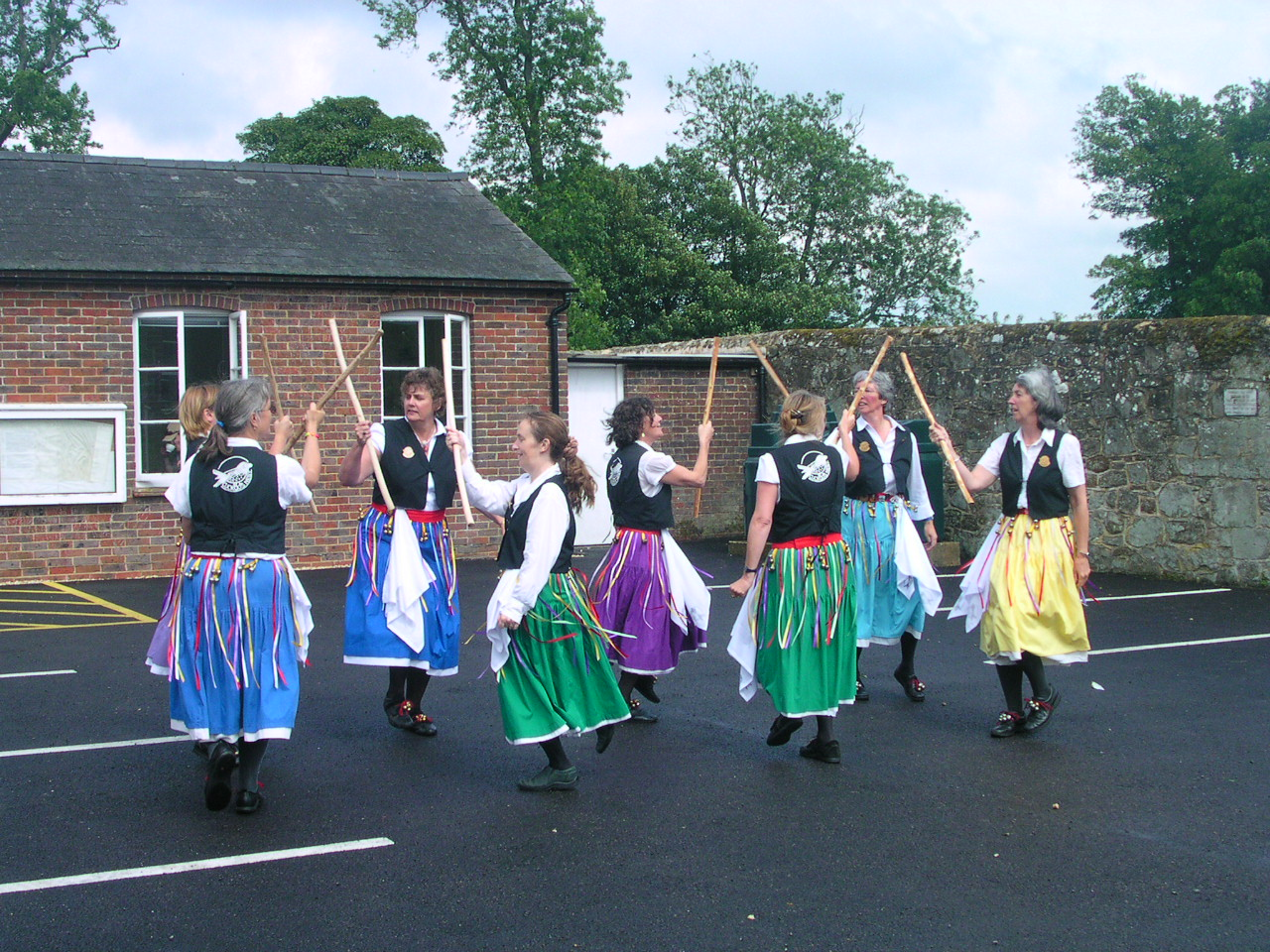
Morris dancing at the village hall
