= Pitshill =

Country house in Tillington, West Sussex, England

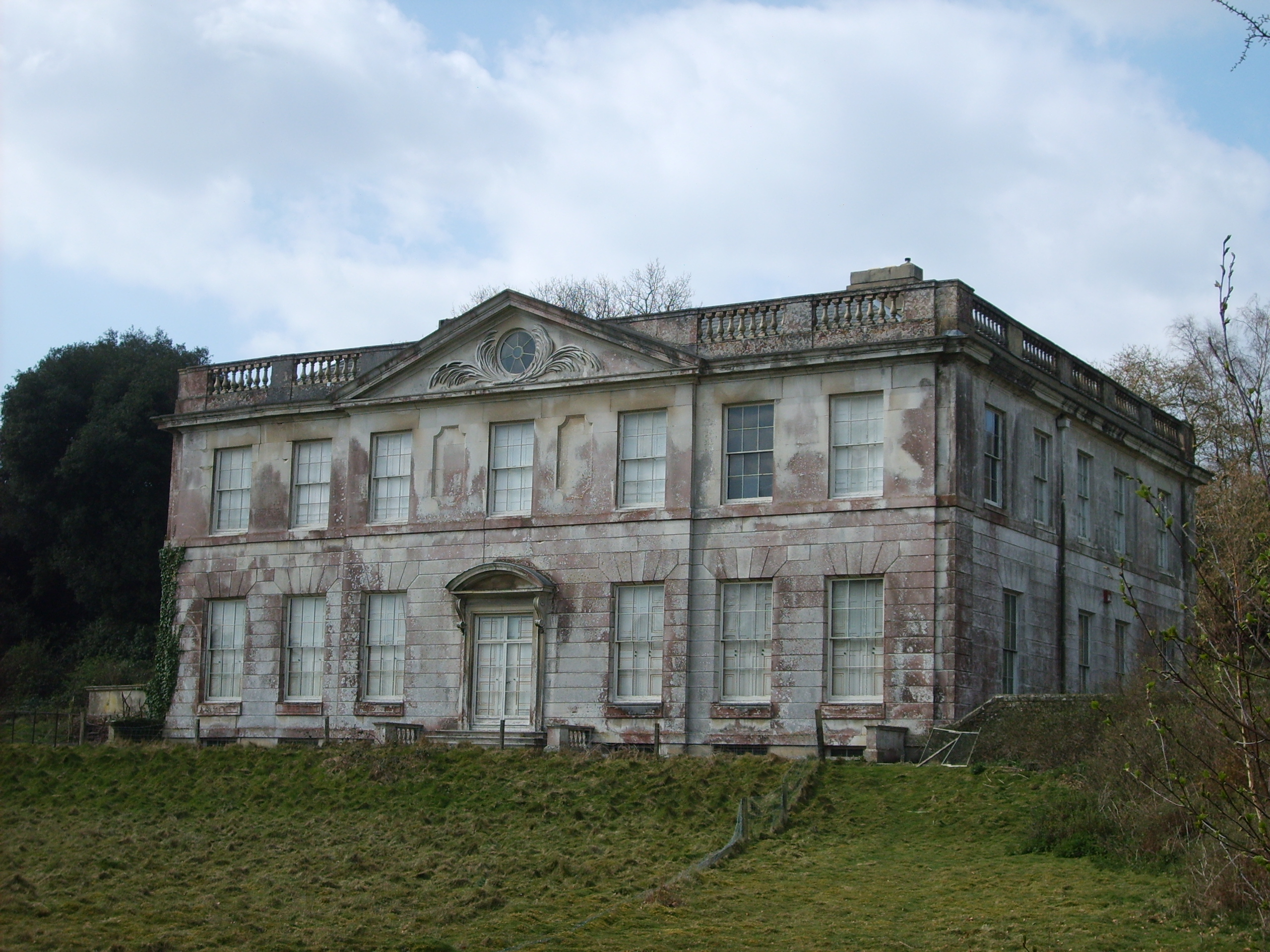
- Pitshill House before restoration

- Location within West Sussex

General information
- Architectural style: Neoclassical
- Location: Tillington, West Sussex, England
- Coordinates: 51°0′N 0°39′W
- Years built: 1760 (started); 1794 (completed)

Design and construction
- Architect: John Upton

Listed Building – Grade II*
- Official name: Pitshill
- Designated: 18 June 1959
- Reference no.: 1217563

Pitshill is a Grade II* listed house built in the neoclassical style and is located within the parish of Tillington, West Sussex, England, a couple of miles west of Petworth. Begun by William Mitford in 1760 on the site of an earlier house it was completed by his son, also William, in 1794. It is considered to be one of the most important country houses in West Sussex.

== History ==
The rectangular house of two storeys with an attic and basement has a main east-facing façade built in 1760 to a design by John Upton, the Petworth Estate surveyor. It is built in limestone ashlar with a rusticated ground floor and a balustraded parapet over the side portions.

The remaining elevations are brick and render decorated to match the east front and were constructed in the 1790s to plans influenced but not completed by Sir John Soane. Further substantial works were carried out to the house in the 1830s, as well as the later 19th-century additions of a veranda and conservatory, these being removed in the 1950s leaving a classical style rectangular building.

Following prolonged negotiations over rerouting a public footpath and bridleway that crossed the estate, the house was restored under the ownership of Charles Pearson, who initiated a seven-year restoration programme beginning in 2010. The project involved significant structural work, including underpinning, reconstruction, and architectural enhancements. The restoration culminated in the property receiving a Georgian Group Award in 2017.

== Other listed buildings ==
The main house is augmented by two 19th-century lodges, an 1840s stable block, a shell house, probably late 18th century, all Grade II listed and standing within a Grade II listed park. in addition there is an ice house, also probably 18th century, and a late 19th-century tower.

== Access ==
A public bridleway and public footpaths through the park provide access.

== See also ==
- Grade II* listed buildings in West Sussex
