= River Rother, West Sussex =

River in Hampshire and West Sussex, England

Rother
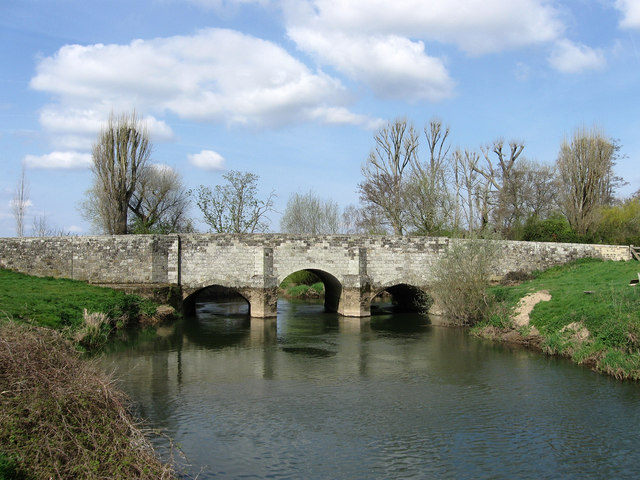
- Fittleworth Bridge over the River Rother

Location
- Country: England
- Counties: West Sussex, Hampshire
- District: Chichester
- Towns: Petersfield, Midhurst

Physical characteristics
- Source
  - location: Empshott, Hampshire
- Mouth: River Arun
  - location: Pulborough, West Sussex
- Length: 52 km (32 mi)
- Discharge
  - location: Hardham
  - average: 4.97 m^{3}/s (176 cu ft/s)
  - minimum: 0.76 m^{3}/s (27 cu ft/s)13 July 2005
- Discharge
  - location: Iping Mill
  - average: 2.27 m^{3}/s (80 cu ft/s)
- Discharge
  - location: Princes Marsh
  - average: 0.51 m^{3}/s (18 cu ft/s)

Basin features
- Tributaries
  - left: River Lod
  - right: Costers Brook

The River Rother flows from Empshott in Hampshire, England, to Stopham in West Sussex, where it joins the River Arun. At 52 kilometres (32 mi) long, most of the river lies within West Sussex except for the first 10 kilometres (6.2 mi) which lie in Hampshire. The upper river, from its source to Midhurst, has been used to power watermills, with the earliest recorded use being in 1086, when the Domesday survey was conducted. Although none are still operational, many of the buildings which housed the mills still exist, and in some cases, still retain their milling machinery. This upper section is also noted for a number of early bridges, which have survived since their construction in the fifteenth, sixteenth and seventeenth centuries.

The lower river, from Midhurst to its junction with the River Arun, has been used for navigation. Boats used the section from the Arun to Fittleworth following improvements made to the Arun in 1615, and after the Arun Navigation was completed in 1790, the Earl of Egremont made the river navigable up to Midhurst by constructing eight locks and some small cuts. The work was completed in 1794, and many of the bridges built at that time still survive. With the opening of the Mid-Sussex Railway branch to Midhurst in 1859, traffic declined, and commercial use of the river had ceased by the 1880s. Pleasure boats continued to be used on the river for many years, and published accounts of journeys along the decaying navigation appeared in 1914 and 1920. The navigation was officially abandoned in 1936, after an undergraduate pointed out that it was still a public right of way.

The river flows through the South Downs National Park, and is a designated Site of Nature Conservation Importance, in recognition of its value for wildlife. It supports a wide range of fish, and its upper reaches are the only location in Sussex where native white clawed crayfish can be found. The quality of the water is generally good, and the river is measured at four gauging stations, three on the main channel, and one of the River Lod, just before its junction with the Rother. Water from the underlying Lower Greensand aquifer and the adjacent chalk aquifer helps to maintain the flows during the summer months, despite the fact that large volumes are abstracted from both the aquifers and the river for the public water supply.

== History ==
River Rother Navigation Act 1791
- Act of Parliament
- Parliament of Great Britain
- Long title: An Act to enable the Earl of Egremont to make, and maintain the River Rother Navigable from the Town of Midhurst, to a certain Meadow called the Railed Pieces or Stopham Meadow, in the Parish of Stopham, and a Navigable Cut from the said River to the River Arun, at or near Stopham Bridge, in the County of Sussex, and for other Purposes.
- Citation: 31 Geo. 3. c. 66
- Territorial extent: Great Britain

Dates
- Royal assent: 11 April 1791
- Commencement: 10 August 1790 (Note: Start of session.)

Status: Current legislation

Text of statute as originally enacted

Following improvements to the River Arun in 1615, which allowed boats to reach Pallingham, they could also navigate part of the Rother, as far upstream as Fittleworth. The canal engineer William Jessop was asked to survey the river below Petworth Mills in 1783, and was recalled in 1790, when he surveyed it below Midhurst. In the same year, the construction of the Arun Navigation was finished, and in 1791, George Wyndham, 3rd Earl of Egremont, who was based at Petworth House, obtained an act of Parliament, the River Rother Navigation Act 1791 (31 Geo. 3. c. 66), which would enable him to improve the Rother. The act also authorised a branch canal to Petworth. Since he owned most of the land adjacent to the river, the precise route of the navigation was not specified, and he was free to improve the channel or make cuts as he saw fit. The only restriction was that cuts could not be made through gardens or enclosed grounds. Compared to most other canals at the time, the charges for using the navigation were low, as the earl wanted to develop the region rather than make a profit.

The river's lower section, below Midhurst, was made navigable by the construction of the Western Rother Navigation in 1794. The length of the navigation was 11.25 miles (18.11 km) of which less than 2 miles (3.2 km) consisted of new cuts, with the rest following the existing channel. It rose through 54 feet (16 m) from Stopham to Midhurst by a series of eight locks, and cost £13,300 to build. Traffic consisted of coal transported up-river, with cargoes of timber, corn and Petworth marble in the other direction. A branch connected it to Petworth by the short Petworth Canal, which was 1.25 miles (2.0 km) long with two locks, and terminated at Haslingbourne to the south of the town. It was opened in 1793, having cost the Earl £5,000 to build, but only lasted for a few years, until a turnpike road was diverted. This made access to Petworth easier, and the canal ceased to be used.

Unlike many canals, where navvies were brought into the neighbourhood to carry out the work, the earl employed local men on the project, most of them already employed by him, and a clergyman praised him for this when writing in 1808, as it led to much less disruption, but provided increased income for those who worked on the scheme. Wages rose from 8 or 9 shillings (40-45p) per week to 14 or 15 shillings (70-75p). During his life, the earl invested some £100,000 in waterways, some in his native county of Sussex, but also in attempts to build a canal from London to Portsmouth. Between 1802 and 1831, the average income from the canal was around £550 per year. Competition arrived in 1859, when the Mid-Sussex Railway opened a line from Horsham through Pulborough to Petworth. Traffic declined, and by the 1880s, the navigation was no longer used by commercial boats, although it was not officially abandoned until 1936.

=== Closure ===
Despite the navigation being closed, a guide to Midhurst published in 1895 advertised that skiffs could be hired, and fishing could be enjoyed. The boats were hired out by a plumber called William Port, and his business continued to prosper until 1912, when his boathouse burned down. Rowing boats were also available for hire at Coultershaw and Fittleworth. Another book called A New Oarsman's Guide, published in 1896, suggested that the river could be canoed from Iping to the Arun, a distance of 19 miles (31 km), when there was sufficient water. By that time, none of the locks were workable, and boats had to be carried around them.

In 1887, part of the river bank near Todham Lock, which bordered the Cowdray estate of the Earl of Egmont, had collapsed, and the earl suggested that Lord Leconfield of Petworth, a successor to the Earl of Egremont, should pay for its repair. After some disagreement, a compromise was reached, under which the bank was repaired and a floodgate was fitted at the upper end of the lock, with both men paying half of the cost. Lord Leconfield assumed that when the Arun Navigation finally obtained a warrant of abandonment in 1896, his responsibilities for the maintenance of the River Rother had ended. However, in 1903 heavy rain and floods destroyed the floodgate and part of the adjacent weir, resulting in river levels though the 8th Earl of Egmont's estate dropping by 2 feet (0.6 m). The earl, Augustus Arthur Perceval, issued a writ against Lord Leconfield for damages. The case was heard in the High Court, at which it was agreed that the navigation was now useless, but that the two men would share the costs of rebuilding the floodgate, after which responsibility for its maintenance would pass to the earl, who could also dredge the river above the lock.

P. Bonthron, who published a book entitled My Holidays on Inland Waterways in 1916, described a journey down the river that he had made with friends in 1908, in a boat hired from William Port at Midhurst. They reached Arundel on the River Arun after two days, from where the boat was sent back to Midhurst by train. Another account of a similar journey made in 1914 by Eleanor Barnes and a friend appeared in As the Water Flows, first published in 1920, which described canoe journeys on the rivers of southern England made by her over a period of seven or eight years. The warrant of abandonment was obtained jointly by the estates at Petworth and Cowdray after an Oxford undergraduate called Roger Sellman pointed out that the river was still officially a right of way, and that anyone could therefore offer to pay the appropriate tolls to use a boat on it, and expect the owners to rebuild the locks. The powers of the Railway and Canal Traffic Act 1888 (51 & 52 Vict. c. 25) were invoked to declare that the navigation was no longer necessary, and despite objections from the River Arun Catchment Board and a canoe club, the warrant was granted on 15 April 1936. However, the Environment Agency noted in 2003 that although there used to be navigation rights on the river, "the existing status of the navigation is unknown."

== Hydrology ==
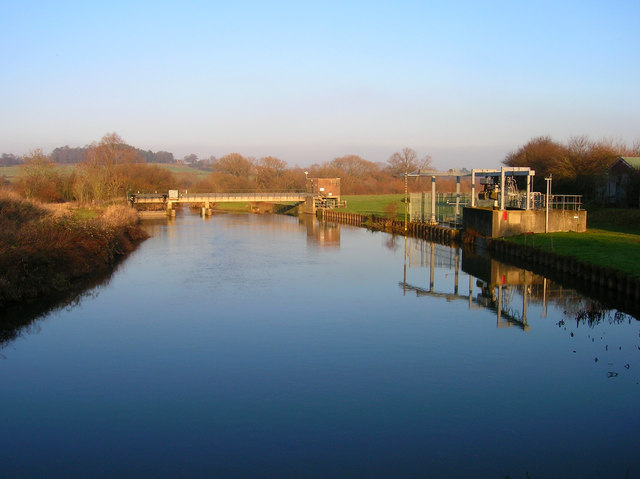
The pumping station at Hardham, just above the junction with the River Arun

The river flows through the South Downs, an Area of Outstanding Natural Beauty and since 2011, a designated national park. There are two large aquifers in the area, one consisting of chalk, to the south of the river valley, and the other the Lower Greensand Group, underlying the whole of the river. The aquifers are separated by a Gault Formation, which consists of clay. At the western edge of the region, both the chalk and the gault turn to the north, creating a scarp slope. The base flow of the river consists of water from the Lower Greensand aquifer, and from springs along the bottom of the chalk scarp slope. These help to maintain the flows in the river during the summer months, although there have been significant periods where flows have been low, notably in the drought of the early 1990s, and again in 1995–96. These led to declines in the populations of the macro-invertebrates which are used to measure the health of a river, but these have subsequently recovered. In order to monitor the hydrology, the Environment Agency has a series of observation boreholes along the valley, and maintains gauging stations at Princes Marsh, close to the source, at Iping Mill, at Halfway Bridge on the River Lod just above its junction with the Rother, and at Hardham, just before the river joins the Arun.

Flows in the river are swelled by discharges from several sewage treatment works. The three largest are at Princes Marsh, Petersfield and Ambersham, all of which have outflows between 0.22 and 1.10 million imperial gallons (1 and 5 Ml) per day, with another three discharging between 0.022 and 0.220 million imperial gallons (0.1 and 1 Ml) per day at Rogate, Coultershaw and Fittleworth. The entire river, including parts of some of its tributaries, is designated as a Site of Nature Conservation Importance by the local authorities through which it flows, in recognition of its value for wildlife. The upper reaches of the Rother are important for their fish populations of brown trout, grayling, juvenile sea trout, and the spawning and early development of salmonids. There are also populations of bullhead, eel, lamprey, minnow and stone loach. There has been some concern about declining fish stocks, thought to be partly caused by soil erosion, leading to silt and sediments being deposited on the river bed, which has been exacerbated by low flows in the river. Parts of the lower river support the same types of fish, but there are areas, particularly immediately upstream of weirs, where the major species are bream, pike and roach, with chubb, dace and perch on the lowest reaches. In order to assist the movement of fish along the river, particularly those that migrate to the headwaters to spawn, fish passes have been constructed around the gauging stations. The only known population of native white clawed crayfish in Sussex is located in the upper reaches of the Rother.

The quality of the water is generally good, helped by the fact that the groundwater in the chalk aquifer is of very high quality. However, some of the small streams in the upper reaches are polluted by discharges of effluent which are not licensed, and there are areas where the water in the aquifer, and hence the river, has raised levels of nitrates, largely caused by agricultural fertilisers. The Environment Agency has produced improvement plans to address a number of sources of both agricultural and urban pollution. Natural flows in the river are affected by the abstraction of water for the public water supply. There are many locations at which water is abstracted along the course of the river, including a site in the upper reaches where more than 5 megalitres (1.1×10^{6} imp gal) per day is abstracted from the aquifer, and another where the volume exceeds 10 megalitres (2.2×10^{6} imp gal). Just above the junction with the River Arun, the Hardham Water Supply Works abstracts up to 75 megalitres (16×10^{6} imp gal) per day from the river.

== Toponymy ==
The river takes its name from Rotherbridge, not the other way round. Rotherbridge is derived from the Anglo-Saxon Redrebruge, meaning cattle bridge, which was also the name of the Saxon Hundred or administrative group of parishes. Before this the river was known as the Scir.

== Route ==
The route description has been split into two sections. From its source to Midhurst, the river has powered several mills, but has never been navigable. Below Midhurst, it was navigable until the navigation closed in the 1880s. There were eight locks on this section, some of which bypassed additional water mills.

=== Source to Midhurst ===
The River Rother rises from several springs near Empshott in Hampshire. The main one supplies watercress beds, before passing under Mill Lane, to the south of the village. It continues eastwards, to reach Greatham Mill. The mill, together with the mill house and an attached barn, which date from the late eighteenth or early nineteenth centuries, and are built of brick, are Grade II listed structures. All of the original machinery of the mill is still in situ, but is not operational, as the water supply has been diverted. The stream turns to the south-east, and passes under the A3 West Liss bypass, and Greatham Bridge, on the old route. It is joined by other streams, and turns south to reach Liss railway station. The railway and the river follow the same general route, and the river crosses under the railway five times before reaching Sheet. At the northern edge of the village, the river is joined by the Ashford Stream, and there is another mill. After passing under the A272 road, to the east of the village, it reaches Sheet Mill.

Tillmore Brook joins from the west, and the course turns to the east. At Durford, a hamlet which forms part of the civil parish of Rogate, it passes the ruins of Durford Abbey, a Premonstratensian monastery situated on the north bank. It is a scheduled ancient monument, and the site includes a threshing barn with a water wheel and associated drive shafts. On the south bank is Durford Mill. This mill house is a grade II listed structure, and was built of clunch in 1770. The mill itself has been modernised and enlarged, and is not listed. A little further downstream, Durford Lane, heading south towards Harting, crosses the river at Durford Bridge, built about 1600 with four semi-circular arches. It was restored in 1924. To the north of Habin, another hamlet in Rogate, North Lane crosses the river on Habin Bridge, which has four round-headed arches, and was probably built in the seventeenth century, but might be earlier. It is built of stone, and was restored in the eighteenth century.

To the north of Dumpford, a hamlet in the civil parish of Trotton with Chithurst, is Terwick Mill. It is a grade II* listed structure, and consists of two mills, side by side. They were operational until 1966. The north mill is a timber-framed building, clad with weatherboarding, dating from the sixteenth century. The south mill was built of coursed stone rubble around 1750. Although it has been converted into a house, it still contains two iron waterwheels, one for each mill, and its machinery. The earliest documentary evidence for the mill dates from 1635. The adjacent mill house, parts of which date from the eighteenth century, is also a listed building. The river turns to the north to pass to the east of Trotton, and is crossed by Trotton Bridge, dating from the early 1600s, which has five ribbed arches. The river then turns to the east again at Chithurst, where Abbey House, an L-shaped timber-framed building dating from the fifteenth century, and the parish church, much of which dates from the eleventh century, are located on the north bank. An eighteenth century stone and brick bridge with two arches carries Chithurst Lane over the river.

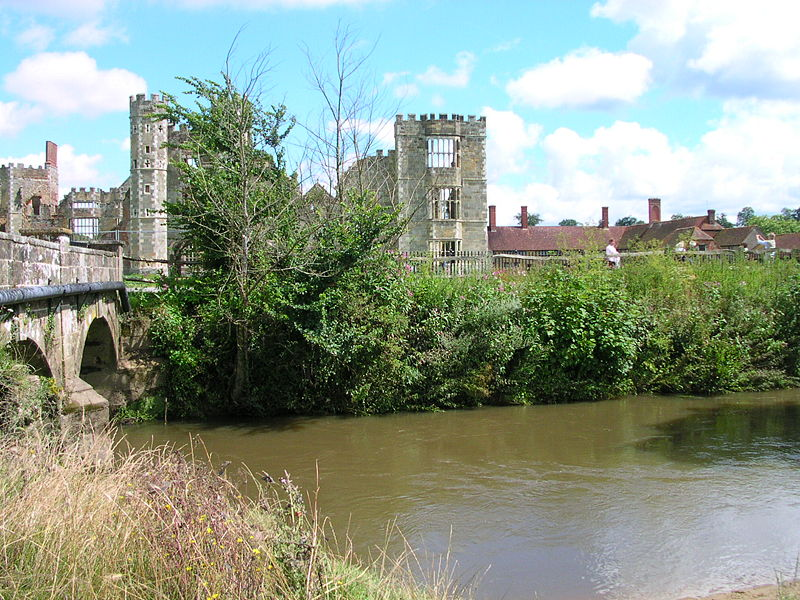
The River Rother at Cowdray Ruins

Continuing eastwards, the river is crossed by Iping Bridge at Iping, a narrow stone bridge with five arches dating from the seventeenth century. To the west of the bridge is the site of Iping watermill. A mill was recorded there in the Domesday survey, completed in 1086. By 1665, there were the remains of a fulling mill at the site, and a wheat-mill and malt-mill, both part of the same building. It became a paper mill in the eighteenth century, and continued to operate until it was destroyed by fire in 1930. At Stedham, part of the civil parish of Stedham with Iping, Stedham Lane crosses the river on a stone bridge with six segmental arches. Five of them date from the seventeenth century, with one later addition. The river then makes a large loop to the north, where Stedham Mill was situated. The mill building has been demolished, but the mill house is a listed structure. After the loop, Woolbeding Bridge, on the western approach to Midhurst, dates from the fifteenth or sixteenth centuries; it has four segmental arches, was restored in 1919, and is a grade II* listed structure.

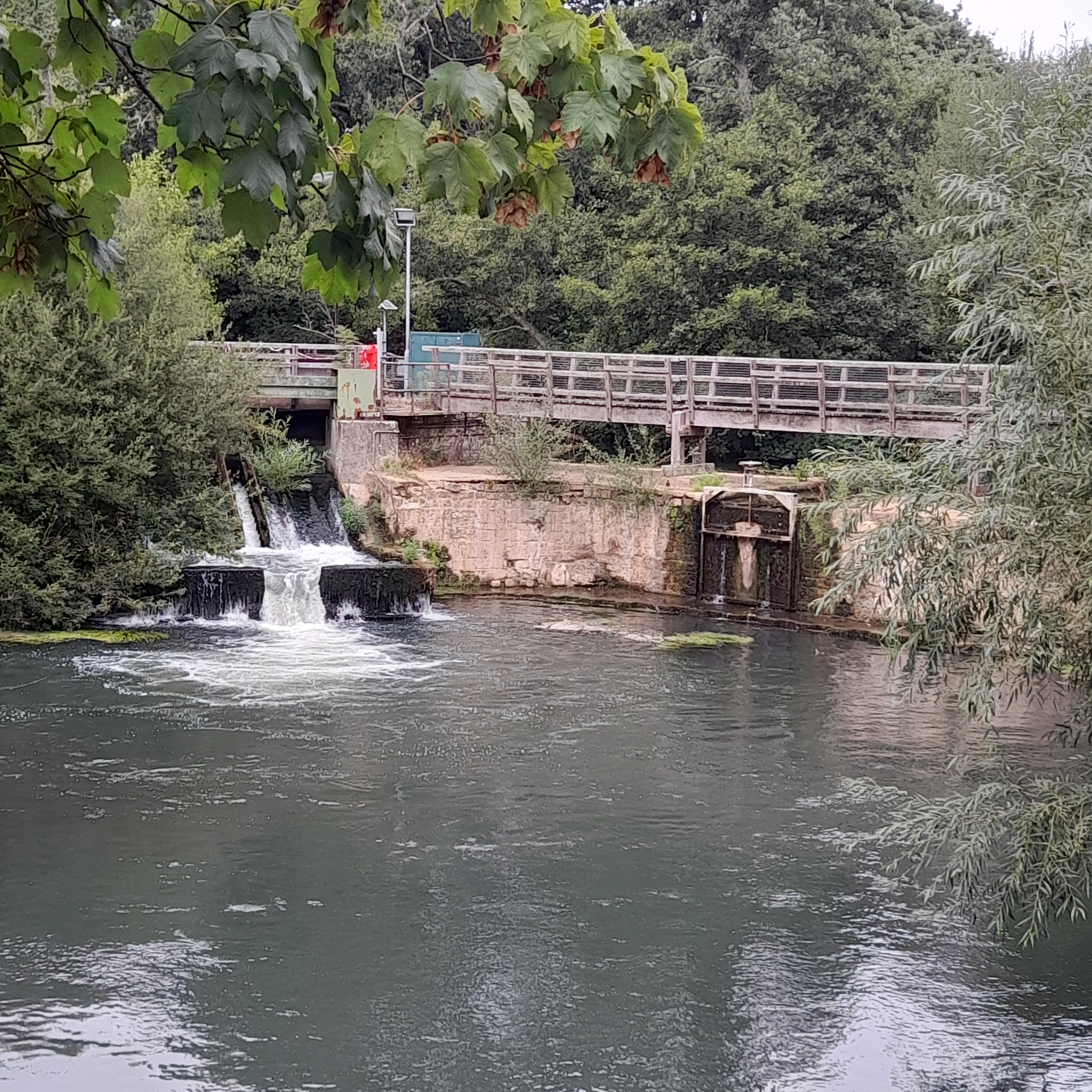
Weir at Easebourne/Midhurst during 2026 drought

After another loop to the north, the river passes between Easebourne to the north east and Midhurst to the south west and over a weir, beyond which the bridge, built in 1826, carries the A272 road; it has two wide arches, and was of ashlar construction. Although this structure is still in situ, it is difficult to see, as a pedestrian bridge has been built on the north west side, attached to the original bridge by cantilevers, and one of the two arches was widened in 1912 by the addition of another arch outside it. Below the bridge is the mill house and adjoining water mill of North Mill. The mill carries the date 1840, and the house is of a similar age, although built in two stages. The river flows briefly to the south, passing Cowdray on the east bank, which is a scheduled ancient monument. It consists of a medieval fortified house, which is partly ruined, although some of it has been reused. It is situated within Cowdray Park, a grade II* listed landscaped park, which forms the grounds for Cowdray House, a nineteenth-century mansion some 0.75 miles (1.2 km) further east. On the opposite bank is a motte-and-bailey castle, dating from the twelfth century. Below this point, the river was navigable.

=== Midhurst to mouth ===
The terminus of the Rother Navigation was on a side stream, at the southern edge of Midhurst. There was a wharf and basin, close to a road which is still called The Wharf, and an ashlar bridge crosses the navigation between the wharf and the junction with the main river. It was built in 1794, and was restored in 1977 to commemorate the silver jubilee of Queen Elizabeth II. The first lock was near Little Topham farm. There was a lock cut across a loop to the north. Costers Brook, which flows north from springs near Cocking, and then alongside the river for a short distance, joins below the site of the lock. The bridge at South Ambersham was built of stone rubble in 1791, with a main arch across the navigation and a smaller arch to the north, which has been repaired with brick. Moorland Lock was on a straight cut across a large meander to the south, close to Moorlands Farm. Lodsbridge Lock also bypasses a meander to the south, which fed Lodsbridge Mill. The mill building dates from the eighteenth century, and has been converted into a house. The seventeenth-century timber-framed mill house is also a listed building. There was a motte castle immediately to the south of the mill. A modern timber yard and saw mill is located to the north of the lock site, and Lods Bridge, which carries a minor road over the river, dates from the construction of the navigation. The River Lod joins on the north bank just below the bridge.

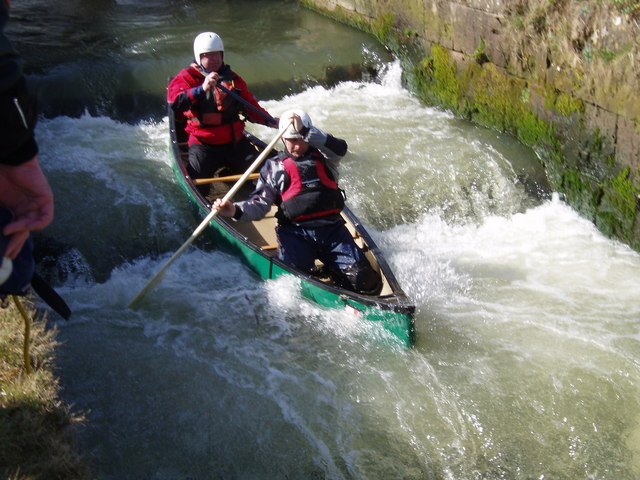
A canoe negotiating the disused Moorlands Lock

A widening in the modern river, close to the dismantled Midhurst branch of the London, Brighton and South Coast Railway, marks the site of Ladymead Lock, with a weir to the south and the lock structure to the north. The fourth lock was Coultershaw Lock. The river at this point runs to the south, and there was a large meander to the west with a weir at its head. The mill stream ran to the east, and the lock was built just to the west of the mill. Coultershaw Bridge now carries the A285 road over the mill stream, near which is Coultershaw Beam Pump; it was built in 1782 to provide a better water supply to Petworth House. The pump is powered by a water wheel, cast at Cocking Foundry, which is 11 feet (3.4 m) in diameter. There were two corn mills and a malt mill recorded on the site in 1534. The mill was modernised in 1910, when turbines replaced the wheels, and standby engines were installed in 1919. It was destroyed by fire in 1923, and a steel-framed concrete building replaced it. When it ceased to operate in 1972, the building was demolished, but the beam pump, which was located beneath the building, was rescued and has been restored. The pump no longer performs its original function, but supplies a fountain near the visitor centre.

Shopham Lock was another where the lock cut was built across a large meander to the north. The bridge at the tail of the lock is built from red and grey brick, and has a single, round-headed arch. It dates from the construction of the navigation, and is virtually unaltered. Nearby, the Petworth Canal headed northwards to Haslingbourne Bridge. Below the end of the cut, the river is joined by the stream from Burton Mill Pond, which supplied an iron forge built in 1789. It is crossed by Shopham Bridge, built in the nineteenth century from red brick with grey headers and a parapet in stone, with three segmental arches. At Lower Fittleworth, there is another mill building, although it is unused and in poor condition. It was built in 1628 and enlarged in 1742. It stands in the grounds of the mill house, which was rebuilt in 1913. The lock cut ran along the south-western edge of the site. Fittleworth Bridge consists of a southern section, originally built in the sixteenth century, which was rebuilt between 1717 and 1739, and modified when the navigation was built, to enable boats to pass through the centre arch. A north section, adjacent to the millpond, dates from 1811 to 1812.

Near its junction with the River Arun, the river loops to the south in a large meander. A cut ran from the start of the meander to join the Arun above the original junction, with a lock towards the downstream end. The meander fed Hardham Corn Mill. A lock bypassed the mill and the millstream, to enable boats to reach the Hardham Tunnel cut, which headed south from a junction above the mill. The Tunnel Branch was destroyed by the construction of a water treatment works, and the modern weir near the mouth is much closer to the junction than the lock was.

== Conservation ==
The Arun & Rother Rivers Trust (ARRT) was set up in 2011 with the objective of enhancing and protecting the river and other connected waterways. It is a charity with further objectives concerning education, fisheries, biodiversity, access and pollution. The organisation is registered as a limited company, and was asked in 2012 to produce a Catchment Management plan by the Department for Environment, Food and Rural Affairs. It worked with the Arun and Rother Connections (ARC) Partnership and the South Downs National Park Authority to ensure that local opinion was adequately represented in the document.

== Water quality ==
The Environment Agency measure the water quality of the river systems in England. Each is given an overall ecological status, which may be one of five levels: high, good, moderate, poor and bad. There are several components that are used to determine this, including biological status, which looks at the quantity and varieties of invertebrates, angiosperms and fish. Chemical status, which compares the concentrations of various chemicals against known safe concentrations, is rated good or fail.

The water quality of the River Rother system was as follows in 2019.

Section	Ecological status	Chemical status	Length	Catchment
Western Rother (Upstream Petersfield)	Poor	Fail	9.4 miles (15.1 km)	21.91 square miles (56.7 km^{2})
Stanbridge Stream	Moderate	Fail	3.6 miles (5.8 km)	9.44 square miles (24.4 km^{2})
Western Rother Durford	Moderate	Fail	3.0 miles (4.8 km)	3.83 square miles (9.9 km^{2})
Harting Stream	Moderate	Fail	3.8 miles (6.1 km)	4.43 square miles (11.5 km^{2})
Elsted Stream	Moderate	Fail	4.9 miles (7.9 km)	5.16 square miles (13.4 km^{2})
Hammer Stream (W. Sussex)	Moderate	Fail	3.2 miles (5.1 km)	9.36 square miles (24.2 km^{2})
Minsted Stream	Moderate	Fail	5.4 miles (8.7 km)	7.01 square miles (18.2 km^{2})
Lod	Poor	Fail	13.8 miles (22.2 km)	20.58 square miles (53.3 km^{2})
Haslingbourne Stream	Moderate	Fail	5.5 miles (8.9 km)	6.07 square miles (15.7 km^{2})
Western Rother	Moderate	Fail	34.8 miles (56.0 km)	51.30 square miles (132.9 km^{2})

The reasons for the quality being less than good include sewage discharge affecting most of the river, some physical modification of the channel, the presence of North American signal crayfish, which are an invasive species, and runoff of chemicals as a result of agriculture and land management. Like most rivers in the UK, the chemical status changed from good to fail in 2019, due to the presence of polybrominated diphenyl ethers (PBDE) and mercury compounds, neither of which had previously been included in the assessment.

== Points of interest ==
Point	Coordinates (Links to map resources)	OS Grid Ref	Notes
Source of River Rother	51.0675°N 0.9490°W	SU737303	
Greatham Mill	51.0679°N 0.9094°W	SU765304	
River by Liss Station	51.0439°N 0.8934°W	SU776277	
Sheet Mill	51.0118°N 0.9175°W	SU760241	
Durford Mill	51.0036°N 0.8901°W	SU779232	
Terwick Mill	50.9930°N 0.8173°W	SU831221	
Stedham Mill	51.0017°N 0.7702°W	SU863232	
Site of Midhurst Wharf	50.9847°N 0.7347°W	SU889213	Upper end of navigation
Little Topham Lock	50.9802°N 0.7083°W	SU907208	
Moorlands Lock	50.9827°N 0.6875°W	SU922211	
Lodsbridge Lock	50.9830°N 0.6716°W	SU933212	
Ladymead Lock	50.9731°N 0.6504°W	SU948201	
Coultershaw Lock	50.9661°N 0.6177°W	SU971194	
Shopham Lock	50.9605°N 0.6019°W	SU982188	
Fittleworth Lock	50.9559°N 0.5648°W	TQ008183	
Stopham Lock	50.9535°N 0.5356°W	TQ029181	
Jn with River Arun	50.9524°N 0.5286°W	TQ034180	

== Bibliography ==
- Armstrong, J.R. (1971). A History of Sussex. Sussex: Phillimore. ISBN 978-0-85033-185-1.
- Bruce, Pamela (2000). Northchapel A Village History. Northchapel Parish Council. ISBN 978-0-9538291-0-1.
- CAMS (2003). "The Arun and Western Streams Catchment Abstraction Management Strategy" (PDF). Environment Agency. Archived from the original (PDF) on 10 December 2012.
- Goodsall, R H (1962). The Arun and Western Rother. Constable. ASIN B0000CLL2U.
- Hadfield, Charles (1969). The Canals of South and South-East England. David and Charles. ISBN 978-0-7153-4693-8.
- Jerrome, Peter (2002). Petworth. From the beginnings to 1660. Petworth: The Window Press.
- Marsh, T; Hannaford, J, eds. (2008). UK Hydrometric Register (PDF). Hydrological data UK series. Wallingford, Oxfordshire: Centre for Ecology & Hydrology. ISBN 978-0-9557672-2-7. Archived from the original (PDF) on 31 October 2014.
- Salzman, L.F., ed. (1953). A History of the County of Sussex: Volume 4: The Rape of Chichester. Victoria County History [ISBN unspecified].
- Vine, P.A.L. (1995). London's Lost Route to Midhurst: The Earl of Egremont's Navigation. Sutton Publishing. ISBN 978-0-7509-0968-6.
- Vine, P.A.L. (1985). West Sussex Waterways. Middleton Press. ISBN 978-0-906520-24-6.
- Young, Rev A (1808). A General View of the Agriculture of Sussex.
