= Robin Lee Wilson =

British civil engineer (1933–2019)

Robin Lee Wilson CBE, BSc (Eng), FREng, FICE
- Born: 1933
- Died: 11 November 2019 (aged 86)
- Occupation: Civil engineer
- Known for: President of the Institution of Civil Engineers

Robin Lee Wilson (March 1933 – 11 November 2019) was a British civil engineer. He served as chairman of the Travers Morgan Consulting Group and EC Harris and also as president of the Institution of Civil Engineers in 1991–92. He was master of the Worshipful Company of Paviors in 2003 when the livery company updated its ordinances for the first time since 1479. Wilson also chaired the Construction Industry Council and the heritage trust which manages the Coultershaw Wharf and Beam Pump.

== Career ==
Wilson had a Bachelor of Science degree in engineering and was a fellow of the Royal Academy of Engineering. He was one of six engineers that formed a partnership with Travers Morgan Limited and traded as the Travers Morgan and Partners design consultancy, the partnership was dissolved in October 1990. At one point he also served as chairman of the Travers Morgan Consulting Group. Travers Morgan were bought by Huntingdon International in 1991 and then by Symonds, part of the Compagnie Générale des Eaux conglomerate (now known as Vivendi), in 1995. Wilson has also been chairman of engineering consultancy EC Harris (now part of Arcadis).

Wilson was a fellow of the Institution of Civil Engineers and was its president for the November 1991 to November 1992 session. He was appointed a Commander of the Order of the British Empire in the Queens Birthday Honours of 13 June 1992.

Wilson served as chairman of the Construction Industry Council between 1994 and 1996 and in 1998 was chairman of the Engineering Council's Board for Engineers' Regulation. He was master of the Worshipful Company of Paviors in 2003 when the livery company sought to update its ordinances, last amended in 1479, and to apply for a Royal Charter. Wilson was also active in recruiting new members for the company.

Wilson was chairman of the Coultershaw Heritage Trust, which looks after the Coultershaw Wharf and Beam Pump in West Sussex, from before 2005. Between 2008 and 2012 he project managed the installation of an Archimedes' screw water turbine at the site that looked to supply 65,000 kilowatt hours of electricity per year to the National Grid and save 50 tons of carbon dioxide emissions. The project required a survey to ensure that sheet piling works would not affect a suspected unexploded bomb. The Coultershaw site, operational since 1782, previously supplied water to the town of Petworth and is a scheduled monument.

He died on 11 November 2019 at the age of 86.

Professional and academic associations
Preceded by Roy Thomas Severn	President of the Institution of Civil Engineers; November 1991 – November 1992	Succeeded by Mike Cottell
