= Cocking Foundry =

Historical industrial site

- Traded as: Chorley Iron Foundry
- Industry: Iron foundry
- Founded: pre-1818
- Defunct: 1884
- Headquarters: Cocking, West Sussex, England; 50.95961°N 0.74339°W
- Key people: Robert Chorley

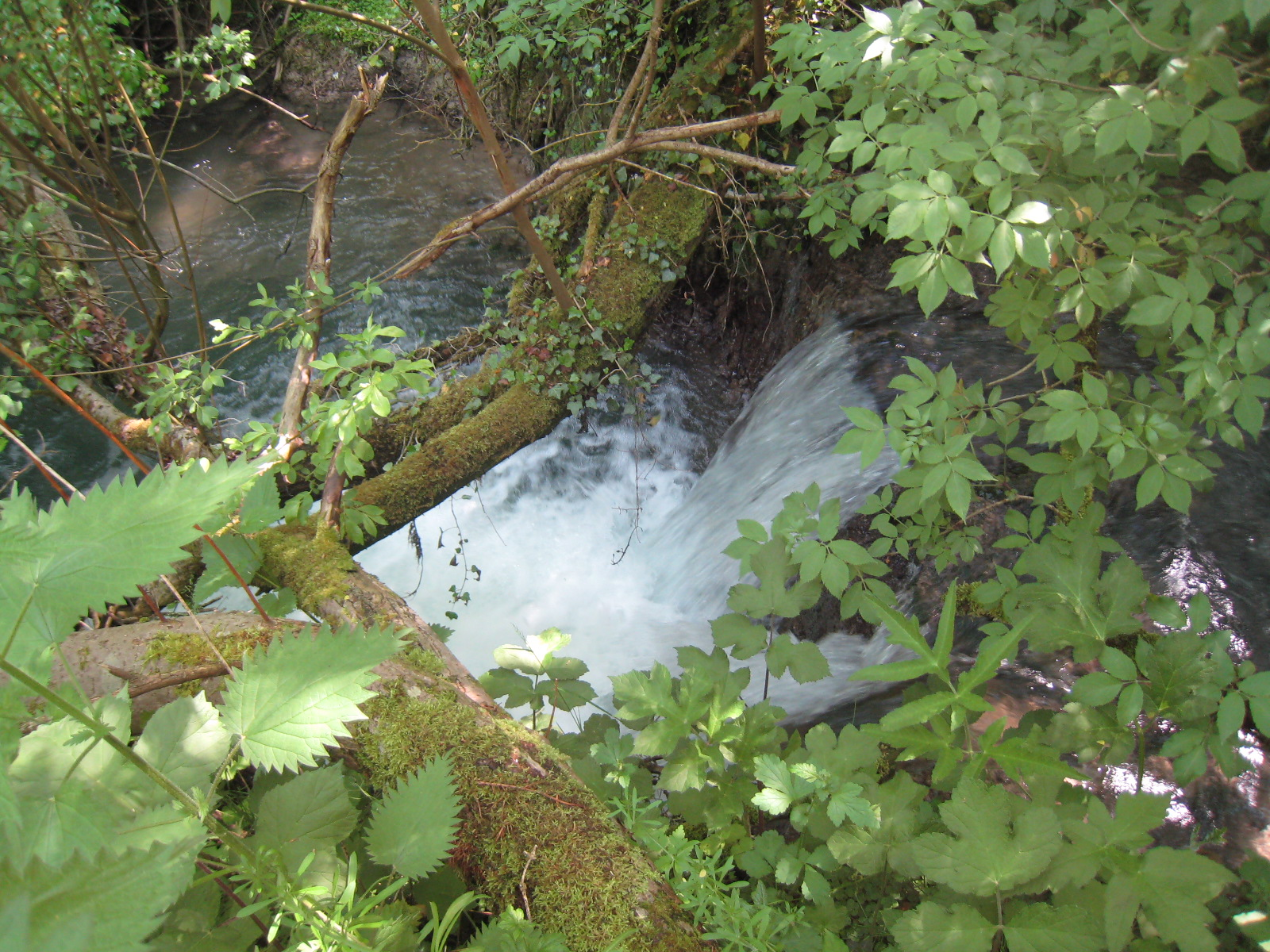
Weir on Costers Brook (probably part of the remains of the foundry)

Cocking Foundry (also known as Chorley Iron Foundry) is an abandoned iron foundry in the South Downs of England. It was situated to the north of the village of Cocking, West Sussex and was active for most of the 19th century. The foundry's output included wheels for watermills, some of which remain in use.

== Location ==
The foundry was situated at grid reference SU883185 on Costers Brook, a northward flowing tributary of the River Rother, about 1.2 km (0.7 mi) north of Cocking and 2.6 km (1.6 mi) south of Midhurst. The site is now on private property and few traces remain visible.

== History ==
The earliest known reference to the foundry at Cocking is in the estate account books of Uppark from 1818 which record payments to Robert Chorley of Cocking Foundry for the repair of the water supply. Chorley subsequently installed a new pump which was gear driven from an overshot metal wheel. There are some remains of the wheel and Chorley's name is cast in the nearby sluice gate.

In December 1838, a lease was drawn up between the Cowdray Estate and "Robert Chorley of Midhurst, millwright" in respect of "two pieces of meadow or pasture land called Upper and Lower Twenty Acres, together with the coppice and pond belonging, in Cocking". The lease permitted the erection of "buildings on the said premises hereby demised for the purposes of his Trade of Millwright" and "one or more water wheels to be driven by the water of the said pond" and the construction of "convenient roads".

On the 1840 tithe map of Cocking, a building marked "Mill" is shown at this location, alongside a representation of a water-wheel. The Ordnance Survey map of 1875 marks the site as "Foundry Pond". This was still referred to as "Foundry Pond" as recently as 1953.

In 1839, Charles "Carlino" Brown (1820–1901), the son of Charles Armitage Brown (close friend and biographer of the poet John Keats), came to Midhurst to visit his Uncle William. While in Midhurst, he met Robert Chorley who agreed to employ and train him as a millwright and engineer. After serving a probationary term, Brown complained to his father that Chorley was no more than a simple millwright and that after his apprenticeship he would have to look for employment elsewhere in order to obtain the knowledge he required. By the end of the following year, the arrangement with Chorley was ended and Brown was engaged on designing a "machine for cutting tobacco". Brown was later to become a senior politician in New Zealand.

The Iron Works stopped working in 1884 when Chorley's business ended in Midhurst.

== Products ==
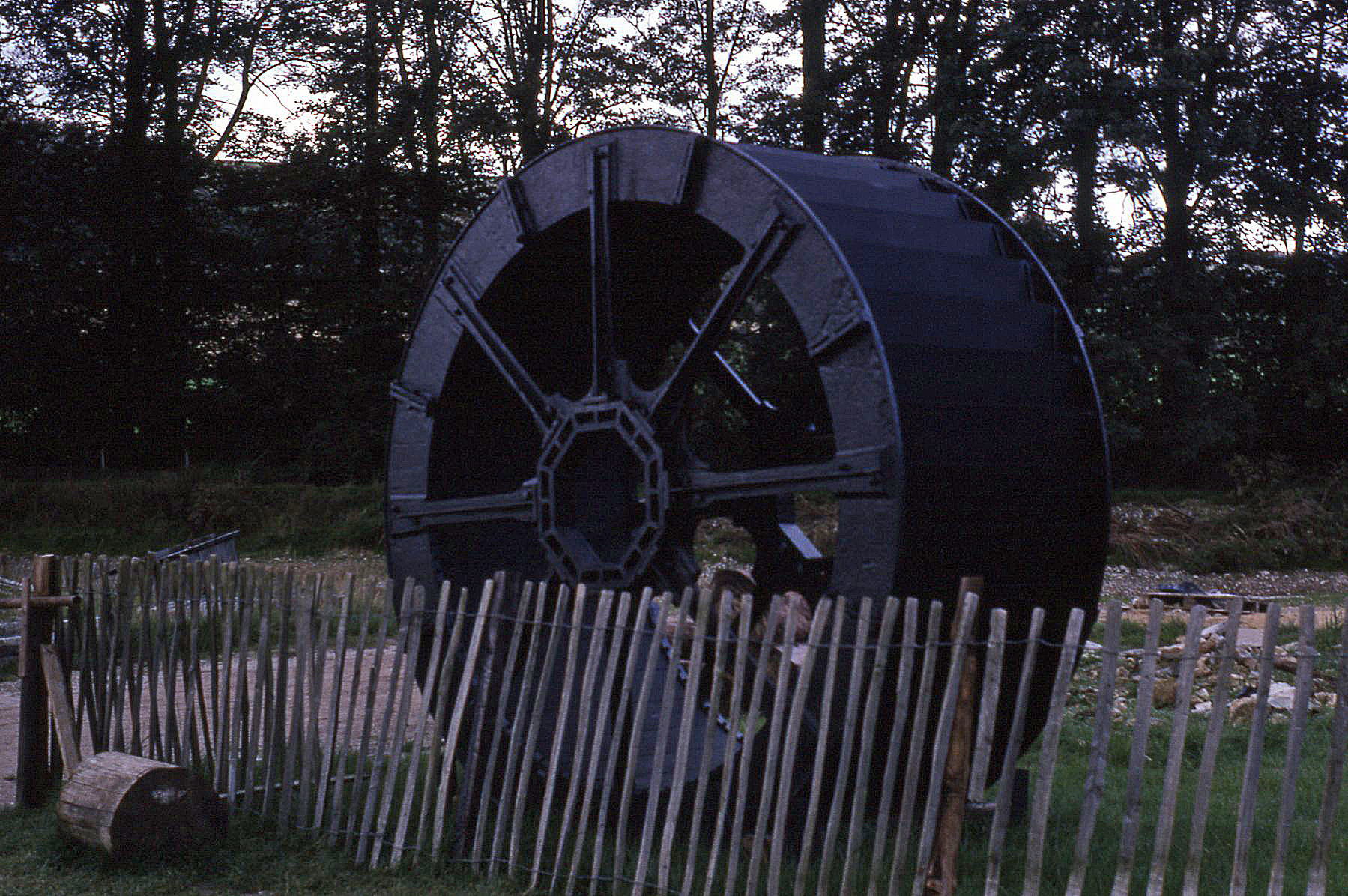
Water wheel for the Lurgashall Watermill awaiting installation at the Weald and Downland Open Air Museum in August 1977

The majority of the foundry's output would have been the manufacture of agricultural implements etc. but the foundry also produced wheels for watermills in the vicinity, including the mill at Cocking village. (This was removed for scrap during World War II as the mill had ceased commercial milling in 1918.) In the churchyard at Cocking there are several iron crosses which are also believed to have been manufactured at Cocking Foundry.

The waterwheel at Bex Mill, just downstream from the foundry, is engraved to show that it was cast by "Moaze, Engineer & Millwright, of Midhurst, at Cocking Foundry"; no other references to Moaze have been found.

Two waterwheels manufactured at the foundry remain in use in local museums. The waterwheel on the mill at the Weald and Downland Open Air Museum at Singleton was made at the Cocking foundry for Costers Mill at West Lavington. After Costers Mill was closed, the wheel was moved to Lurgashall and installed by millwright James Lee, of Midhurst, to replace the original wooden wheel. The wheel is 12 ft (3.7 m) in diameter and when the mill is grinding it rotates at about 6 r.p.m., with each turn needing about 320 imp gal (1,450 L; 380 US gal) of water; it is an overshot wheel consisting of 40 buckets. The mill was presented to the museum by the Leconfield Estate in 1973 and re-erected on its present site in 1977.

At Coultershaw, where the River Rother is crossed by the A285, are situated the former Coultershaw Mill and the Coultershaw Beam Pump. The original Beam Pump was installed in 1872 on the instructions of the 3rd Earl of Egremont to improve the water supply to Petworth House and the town of Petworth. The pump is driven by an 11 ft (3.4 m) diameter breastshot waterwheel, cast at Cocking Foundry in the mid-19th century.

== The foundry today ==
There remains very little evidence of the site of the foundry which is in privately owned woodland on the banks of Costers Brook. In October 1988, Sussex Mills Group organised a site visit. They found traces of the dried up pond and evidence of flow-control mechanism with a large quantity of stone debris in the vicinity.

== Bibliography ==
- Hodgkinson, J. F. (1989). "Cocking Foundry" (PDF). Field Notes. Wealden Iron Research Group.
- Cocking History Group (2005). A Short History of Cocking. Midhurst: Studio Gallery Publications. ISBN 0-9542357-1-1.
