= West Lavington =

West Lavington may refer to:

- West Lavington, West Sussex
- West Lavington, Wiltshire
