= Mike Cottell =

British civil engineer (1931–2014)

Mike Cottell OBE, FREng
- Born: Michael Norman Tizard Cottell; 1931; Chandler's Ford, Hampshire
- Died: 10 February 2014 (aged 82)
- Education: Peter Symonds School; University College, Southampton
- Occupation: Civil engineer
- Known for: President of the Institution of Civil Engineers

Michael Norman Tizard Cottell OBE FREng (1931– 10 February 2014) was a British civil engineer.

== Early life ==
Born at Chandler's Ford in Hampshire in 1931, Cottell studied at Peter Symonds School in Winchester until the age of 16. He then became an assistant in the engineering department of Hampshire County Council and studied civil engineering under a day release scheme at University College, Southampton. He excelled in his studies and achieved top marks in all fields.

Cottell carried out his national service obligation with the Royal Engineers and saw service in the Malaya Emergency, working alongside the Gurkhas. He was recalled to serve with the army in the Suez Crisis of 1956.

He was elected a member of the Institution of Civil Engineers (ICE) in 1958, upon reaching the then minimum age of 25. During this time he worked for the Gloucestershire, Northamptonshire and Berkshire County Councils, and contracts he was involved with included the Oxford Western Bypass and the M4 motorway between Hanbrook and Tormarton.

== Computer-aided design pioneer ==
Cottell was an early adopter of computers for engineering design and a paper he wrote on their use was awarded a prize by the Institution of Municipal Engineers. He is regarded as one of the main contributors to the development of computer-aided design. Cottell developed an early highways design computer program, known as VALOR, in 1970 that was used by many local authorities in the UK. VALOR simplified the design of road widening and reconstruction schemes, drawing a number of closely spaced cross sections which showed the proposed road levels and the survey information of the existing road. The program could optimise the design levels of the new road to minimise the cost of the project by utilising existing road make-ups. The implementation of VALOR was not entirely successful due partly to the limited processing power of the computers available to consulting engineers of the time.

In 1986 the program was updated and incorporated into the BIPS design package by a consortium of local authorities, with the development team led by Warwickshire County Council, as the new MOSS road design package did not include a similar facility. A Windows compatible version was begun but never completed owing to the general decline of local authority design work and the increased use of consultant engineers. The dominance of the MOSS system for design did not always extend to sites, where older computers were often used, and it was not uncommon for designers to use MOSS to design the works and for contractors to use BIPS during construction. The BIPS system was used by Cambridgeshire County Council until 1999, including for the pre-contract works of the 16 km A1(M) upgrade between Peterborough and Alconbury.

== County surveyor ==
Cottell became assistant and deputy county surveyor for East Suffolk and East Sussex and was elected a fellow of the ICE in 1976. He became county surveyor of Northamptonshire in 1979 and of Kent in 1984. In the latter post he had responsibility for a £210 million capital expenditure budget and a staff of 1,000 employees. As county surveyor he opposed an ICE proposal to ban heavy goods vehicles from unclassified roads, calling instead for "lorry management plans" directing goods vehicles to suitable major roads. In recognition of his work Cottell was appointed an Officer of the Order of the British Empire on 31 December 1987. He was appointed a major in the Engineering and Transport Staff Corps, a volunteer unpaid force providing technical expertise to the British Army, on 1 April 1989. He was promoted to lieutenant-colonel in that corps on 30 September 1992 and was transferred onto the supernumerary list of officers on 25 July 1996.

== Other interests ==
Cottell remained heavily involved with the ICE, writing papers for their journals and serving on regional committees for the South Midlands, East Anglia and the South East. Cottell served on the ICE council for five years and was vice-president from 1989 to 1992. He was a director of the ICE's publishing arm, Thomas Telford Ltd, from 1991 to 1992 and the Benevolent Fund of the ICE from 1992 to 1993. Cottell served as president of the ICE from November 1992 to November 1993. Cottell was given chairmanship of a committee investigating the applicability of the Staff College concept to the British Construction industry by the 1994 Latham Report. He was at various times president and secretary of the County Surveyors' Society and Chairman of the Association of Municipal Engineers. Cottell served as a member of the National Economic Development Office and produced a report, entitled A new approach to road planning, for them.

Cottell retired in 1991 and lived in Kent with his wife Joan. He continued his involvement with the ICE and also with the Rees Jeffreys Road Fund, the Worshipful Company of Paviors, the Worshipful Company of Engineers and the Civil Engineers' Club of which he became chairman. Cottell was a director of Waterman Aspen, the recruitment consultants, from 1996 to 2001 and was also an executive director of Travers Morgan. He was also a Fellow of the Royal Academy of Engineering, being elected in 1990. Cottell died on 10 February 2014 at the age of 82.

== Sources ==
- Bridle, Ron; Baldwin, Peter; Porter, John; Baldwin, Robert (2002a). The Motorway Achievement: Frontiers of knowledge and practice, Volume 1. London: Thomas Telford Ltd. p. 392. ISBN 0727731971.
- Bridle, Ron; Baldwin, Peter; Porter, John; Baldwin, Robert (2002b). The Motorway Achievement: Frontiers of knowledge and practice, Volume 2. London: Thomas Telford Ltd. p. 144. ISBN 0727731971.

Professional and academic associations
Preceded by Robin Wilson	President of the Institution of Civil Engineers; November 1992 – November 1993	Succeeded by Stuart Mustow
