= Cocking Causeway =

Manlet in West Sussex, England

Coordinates: 50.9710°N 0.7423°W

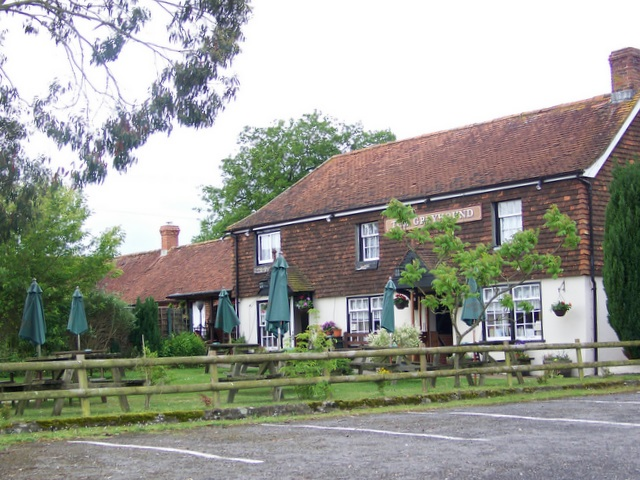
- The Greyhound Inn

- Location within West Sussex
- Civil parish: Cocking
- District: Chichester
- Shire county: West Sussex
- Region: South East
- Country: England
- Sovereign state: United Kingdom
- Post town: Midhurst
- Postcode district: GU29
- Police: Sussex
- Fire: West Sussex
- Ambulance: South East Coast

Cocking Causeway is a hamlet in the civil parish of Cocking, between Cocking and Midhurst in the Chichester district of West Sussex, England.

== Description ==
Cocking Causeway is a linear development of houses and smallholdings alongside the A286 road.

== History ==
The ill-defined area of Cocking Causeway between Midhurst and Cocking has been marked on maps since the early 19th century. In 1865 a large funeral procession assembled at Cocking Causeway for Richard Cobden, who had lived nearby at Dunford. He was buried at West Lavington church, whose parish at that time included the eastern part of the Causeway, whilst the western part fell into Cocking parish.

== Amenities ==
Ecclesiastically, Cocking Causeway falls within Cocking with West Lavington Anglican parish.

The Greyhound is a freehouse pub with bars, dining areas and gardens.

Cocking Causeway is on the Serpent Trail, a 64-mile (103 km) footpath from Haslemere in Surrey to Petersfield in Hampshire.

== Rail ==
The London Brighton and South Coast Railway line between Chichester and Midhurst ran along an embankment parallel to the Causeway. The line had opened in 1881, was closed to passengers in 1935 and was closed completely in 1953. The track bed remains. On 19 November 1951 a freight train hauled by LB&SCR C2X class locomotive no. 32522 was derailed between Cocking and Midhurst after part of the embankment was washed out as a result of a blocked culvert.
