= Rotherbridge =

Village in West Sussex, England

Coordinates: 50.973000°N 0.624800°W

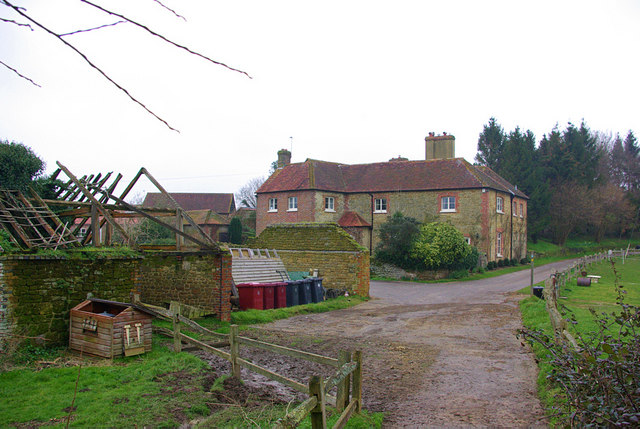
- Rotherbridge Farm viewed from the end of the Rother bridge

- Location within West Sussex
- OS grid reference: SU96652019
  - London: 42 miles (68 km) NNE
- Civil parish: Petworth/Tillington
- District: Chichester
- Shire county: West Sussex
- Region: South East
- Country: England
- Sovereign state: United Kingdom
- Post town: PETWORTH
- Postcode district: GU28
- Dialling code: 01798
- Police: Sussex
- Fire: West Sussex
- Ambulance: South East Coast
- UK Parliament: Arundel and South Downs

Rotherbridge is a village situated approximately 1 mile (1.6 km) south-west of Petworth in West Sussex, England. Until 1800, the road from Chichester to Petworth crossed the River Rother by a bridge here; the river acquired its present name from the bridge. Rotherbridge also gave its name to the Hundred of Rotherbridge which comprised several of the surrounding villages, as well as the town of Petworth.

== Etymology ==
The name "Rotherbridge" is derived from the Anglo-Saxon Redrebruge, meaning "cattle bridge", or "cattle way". The original Old English name was "hrÿdõer brycge", meaning "bridge over which cattle are driven". By 1280, the name had become "Rutherbrig", taking its present form in 1550.

The name "Rother" for the river is a back formation from "Rotherbidge". Before this the river was known as the "Scir", a Saxon word meaning "bright" or "clear".

== The Hundred of Rotherbridge ==
Rotherbridge was also the name of the Saxon Hundred or administrative group of parishes. In the Domesday Book, the Hundred of Rotherbridge comprised the settlements of Sutton, Petworth, Duncton, Barlavington, Lavington, Burton, Glatting and Stopham, a total of 194 households. Rotherbridge was the meeting place for the families from the hundred although this later moved to the town of Petworth.

In 1872, John Marius Wilson, in The Imperial Gazetteer of England and Wales described the Hundred of Rotherbridge as "a hundred in Arundel rape, Sussex, containing Barlavington parish and 11 other parishes. Acres: 40,212. Population in 1851: 9,529. Houses: 1,687."

== The bridge over the River Rother ==
In the late 14th century, a double-arched stone bridge was built across the River Rother by Parson Acon of Petworth. In 1540, John Leland, the antiquary, visited the Rother bridge and wrote that it was "a fayre Bridge of Stone made by one, Parson Acon, who builded the Spire of the faire steeple there in the towne" (of Petworth).

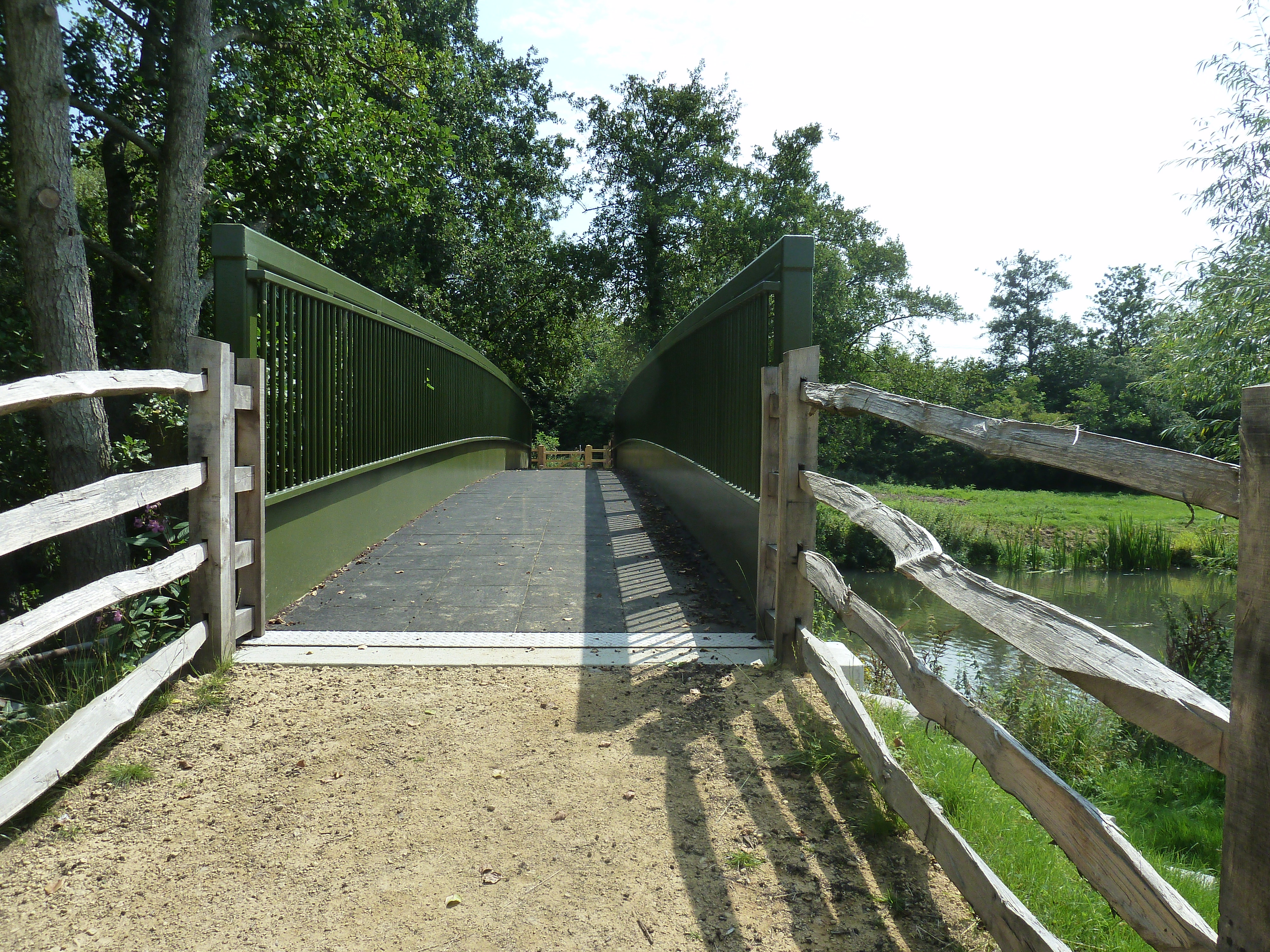
New bridleway bridge over the River Rother by Rotherbridge Farm (July 2011)

Until 1800, the turnpike from Chichester to Petworth descended Duncton Hill before crossing the River Rother at Rotherbridge. From there, travellers could proceed towards Petworth via Rotherbridge Lane or due north to Tillington via Hungers Lane. The Petworth Turnpike Trustees, including the Third Earl of Egremont, suspected that William Warren, the miller at Coultershaw (half a mile south-east) was allowing his "friends" to cross the river by using the mill bridge, thus avoiding the toll for use of the turnpike. By an act of Parliament in 1800, Lord Egremont paid for the construction of a new bridge at Coultershaw Mill and the re-routing of the turnpike direct from there to Petworth. As a result, the former twin-arched bridge was pulled down and the stone was used to build the new bridge at Coultershaw with a toll-house on the west bank of the river.

Following the demolition of the bridge, this was replaced by a floating footbridge to connect the farm at Rotherbridge with that at Kilsham (Kelsham) on the south bank. The bridge was chained to the south (left) bank and could be passed by boat by lifting this at one end. Following the abandonment of the Rother Navigation, the bridge was replaced with a wooden footbridge, and then by a fixed suspension bridge in 1935 and by an iron bridge with tubular railings in 1961. This in turn was replaced in 2010.

== Bibliography ==
- Bruce, Pamela (2000). Northchapel A Village History. Northchapel Parish Council. ISBN 0-9538291-0-3.
- Jerrome, Peter (2002). Petworth. From the beginnings to 1660. Petworth: The Window Press.
- Vine, P.A.L. (1995). London's Lost Route to Midhurst: The Earl of Egremont's Navigation. Sutton Publishing. ISBN 978-0-7509-0968-6.
