= Josiah Pleydell =

Anglican priest

The Venerable Josiah Playdell (1641–1707) was an Anglican priest in England.

Playdell was born in Newnham on Severn and educated at Queen's College, Oxford and King's College, Cambridge Playdell was ordained in 1663 and became curate at Chipping Norton. He held livings at Cocking, Bristol, Lyminster and Nuthurst. He was Archdeacon of Chichester from 1679 until his death.
