= St Catherine of Siena Church, Cocking =

Cocking church
- Church of Saint Catherine of Siena
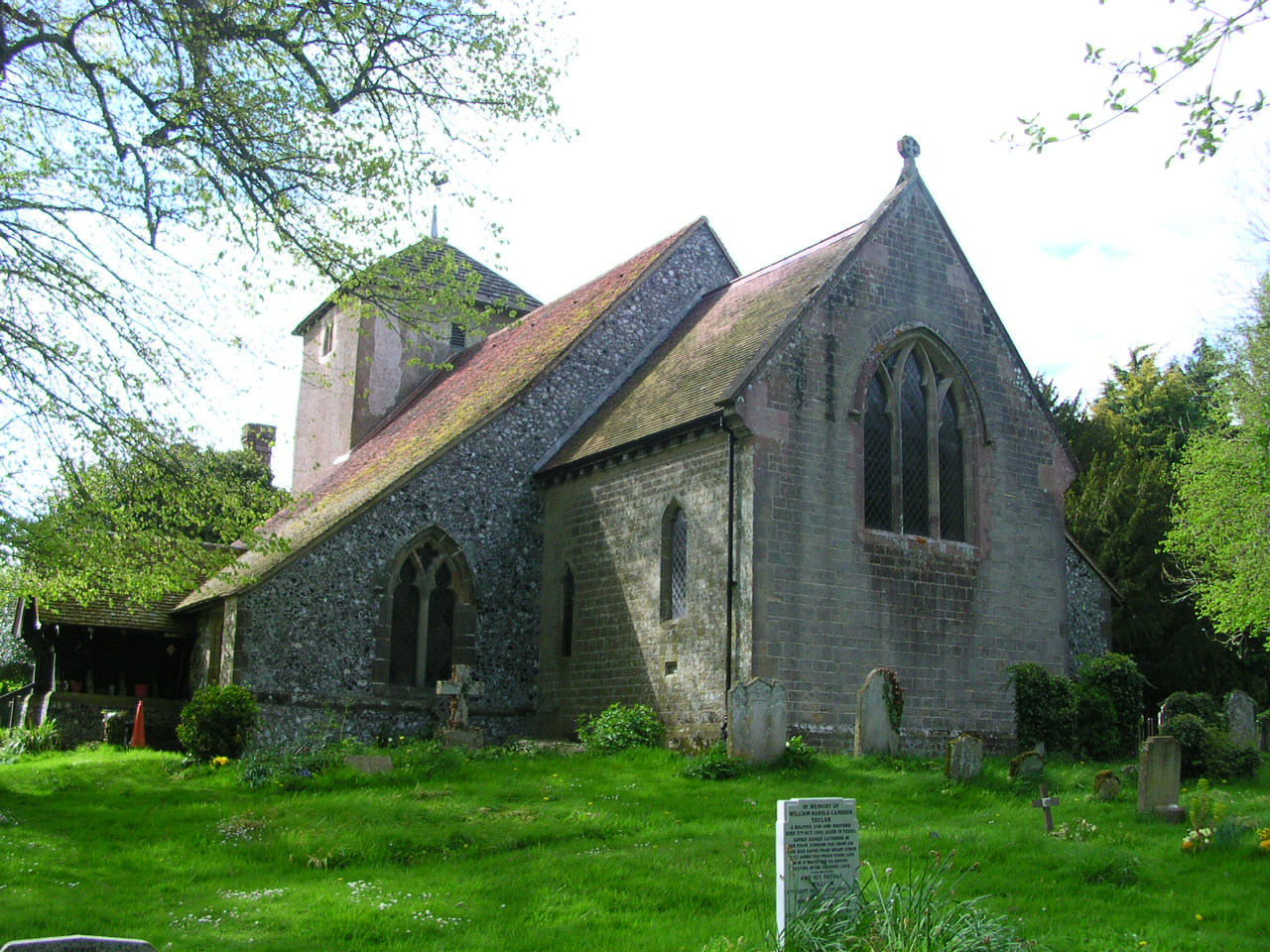
- Cocking church from the south-east
- Cocking church
- 50.9504°N 0.7492°W
- OS grid reference: SU 87955 17522
- Location: Mill Lane, Cocking, West Sussex GU29 0HJ
- Country: England
- Denomination: Anglican
- Website: Under the Downs

History
- Status: Parish church
- Dedication: St Catherine of Siena
- Dedicated: 29 April 2007

Architecture
- Functional status: Active
- Heritage designation: Listed building – Grade I
- Designated: 18 June 1959
- Architect(s): William Slater (North Aisle: 1865); George Pritchett (Vestry: 1896)
- Architectural type: Church
- Style: Saxon / Norman overlap

Specifications
- Materials: Flint with sandstone ashlar dressings

Administration
- Province: Canterbury
- Diocese: Chichester
- Archdeaconry: Horsham
- Deanery: Midhurst
- Parish: Cocking with West Lavington

Clergy
- Rector: Vacancy

St Catherine of Siena Church is an Anglican parish church in Cocking, a village in the district of Chichester, one of seven local government districts in the English county of West Sussex.

The oldest parts of the church date from the 11th century although most of the church is later, from the 12th to 14th centuries, with substantial additions in the mid-19th century. The church had no dedication until, in April 2007, the congregation agreed to dedicate the church to St Catherine of Siena, whose name is engraved on one of the church bells. The church is a Grade I Listed building. Inside the church, the main features of interest are the 11th-century chancel arch, the remnants of a 13th-century wall painting and the 12th-century font.

== Location ==
The church is located at the east of the village between the manor house and Costers Brook. The present manor farmhouse dates from the 15th century and is a Grade II listed building. Parking for the church is in the grounds of the former Manor Farm and is accessed off Mill Lane; there is no vehicular access via Church Lane.

The village war memorial is situated alongside the southern gate into the churchyard from Sunwool Lane, close to where this crosses Costers Brook, in the area known locally as "Bumble Kite". The memorial was originally erected in 1920 in the garden of the headteacher's house attached to the school on the corner of Mill Lane and was moved to its present location in 1959.

== History of the parish ==
The Domesday Book, completed in 1086, records the village of Cocking as "Cochinges" and describes it as having a church and five mills. At this time, the village was held by Robert, son of Tetbald, who had been appointed Sheriff of Arundel and Lord of the Honour of Petworth by Earl Roger de Montgomery. In the 11th century, the church was attached to the St Nicholas collegiate church at Arundel; the college at Arundel then became a priory of the abbey at Séez (Sées) in Normandy, France. Thus the church at Cocking passed to the Abbey of Séez, which was under the Order of Saint Benedict.

In 1199, the ownership of the parish was the subject of a claim against the Abbey by Brian Fitzralph, and his wife, Gunnor on the grounds that it had been taken from her great-grandfather, Alan. The claim was released by Brian and Gunnor in return for a palfrey worth twenty shillings.

In 1234, Ralph Neville, Bishop of Chichester agreed with the Abbot of Séez to appropriate the church at Cocking to the Priory of St Nicholas at Arundel on condition that the Arundel monks should pay twenty shillings per annum to the Vicar of Cocking, in addition to the tithes etc. that he was already receiving. At about the same time, with the consent of the abbey of Séez, the church at Shulbrede, near Linchmere, was appropriated to the priory there, having been a "daughter" of the church at Cocking.

By 1401, the Advowson of Cocking was held by the Bishop of Chichester with whom it remained until 1859, when it was transferred to the Bishop of Oxford. In 1873, it was acquired by the Crown after which it became the gift of the Lord Chancellor.

In December 1931, the benefices of Cocking and neighbouring Bepton were united by the Ecclesiastical Commissioners as "The United Benefice of Cocking with Bepton".

As a result of falling congregations and the church's poor condition, St Mary Magdalene church at West Lavington was closed in September 2008 and the congregation transferred to Cocking. The two parishes were subsequently united and are now known as "The Parish of Cocking with West Lavington". In 2013, the former church at West Lavington was offered for sale, although the graveyard will continue to belong to the parish with public access.

== History of the church ==
In "Cocking Church, West Sussex. A Short History and Guide" published in 1975, Peter Leicester claims that it is believed that a wooden church was built in Cocking around 680, whereas other sources accept that the present church replaced an earlier Saxon church. The chancel arch has been dated as from c. 1080.

The present church was built at the end of the 11th century as a simple "two cell" church with the nave and chancel. The south aisle and Lady Chapel were added about 1300 during the Decorated Gothic period; at the same time, the chancel windows were enlarged and the tower was built.

During the Puritan era (17th century), a minstrels' gallery was built at the western end of the nave. Entrance to the gallery was through a small door to the left of the south door, from where a staircase spanned the south aisle to an opening through the south wall of the nave. The stairs were lit by a gable window set into the roof. The gallery, staircase and door were removed during the 1865 improvements.

In 1865, Revd. Drummond Ash was responsible for the building of the north aisle; this was the work of renowned church architect, William Slater. At the same time, the south aisle was refaced with flint, the porch was added and the south arcade was restored.

In 1896, Revd. Henry Randall extended the north aisle to include the vestry; at the same time, the chancel was partially rebuilt and restored, with the stonework of earlier windows being exposed. The architect was George Pritchett, who was based in Hertfordshire and Essex. In addition, the exterior of the chancel was refaced in ashlar and the west window on the south aisle was altered.

The church was listed at Grade I on 18 June 1959.

=== Dedication ===
It is not known if the church had any dedication prior to the twenty-first century. In April 2007, the congregation agreed to dedicate the church to St Catherine of Siena, whose name is engraved on one of the church bells.

== Church exterior ==
Pevsner describes the church as having a "humble 14th-century tower, roughcast, with a pyramidal cap; the rest from the outside looks all 19th century".

The tower, on the western end, was built in the early 14th century and has a pair of angle-buttresses at each outside corner. The northernmost buttress is taller than the rest, having two stages rather than one. The west doorway has a very weathered, pointed arch. Above this door, there is a small square-headed window on the first stage, with a single trefoil-headed window above this on the second stage. There were originally similar windows at the second stage on the south and north sides, but these have since been filled in. On the highest stage, there are two-light bell-openings with pointed trefoil heads on the south, west, and north sides, with a plain square window on the east. The roof of the tower is now pyramidal, with overhanging eaves, although a drawing from 1795 indicates that the pitch was steeper.

The tower has been "unattractively rendered" on all four faces, other than the lower section on the north face which still shows malmstone block and flint facing.

The north aisle, dressed with knapped flint, dates from the 1865 extensions, other than the eastern end which was extended in 1896 to accommodate the vestry. The drawing of the church from 1795 shows the church before the north aisle was added; there was then a square four-light window in the north wall of the nave. The drawing also shows that there was a smaller two-light window high in the north-west corner, which was connected to a gallery at the western end of the church.

At the eastern end of the church is the chancel. This was reconstructed in 1896, with a new east window being installed and the whole faced with ashlar. The 1795 drawing shows some herringbone brickwork, indicating that the original chancel dates from the 11th century.

The south aisle, which dates from the early 14th-century extension, is also dressed with knapped flint. The south aisle has had buttresses added at each end at a later date.

The present main entrance to the church is through the porch on the south side. The porch is built of timber on a stone base and was erected as part of the 1865 extensions and improvements.

== Church interior ==
The church now has a nave flanked by the south and north aisles, with the chancel containing the main altar. The south aisle contains a second altar in the Lady Chapel.

=== The south aisle ===
The south aisle dates from the early 14th century. At the western end is the Lady chapel with a small altar table, which is used for quiet prayer and contemplation. Behind the altar table is the east window; this has two lights with pointed trefoil heads and a diamond-shaped quatrefoil light at the top; the interior splays of the window have shallow cinquefoil-headed niches.

On the south wall, to the right of the altar are the aumbry, behind a wooden door in a square stone opening, and a triangle-headed piscina; these both date from the construction of the aisle in the early 14th century. The aumbry was used to store chalices and other vessels, as well as for the reserved sacrament, while the piscina was used for washing the communion vessels.

The south window has two trefoil-headed lights, under a square head. The south doorway is from the 19th century, with a pointed arch. The west window was altered in 1865 and also has two trefoil-headed lights, under a quatrefoil.

==== The font ====
The font is situated in the south aisle to the west of the south door. This is a plain, tub font with slightly bowed sides, resembling a chalice. It has a cylindrical stem and base, standing on two square plinths. The rim is chamfered and has slight damage.

Pevsner dates the font to the 12th century although the base is a later medieval addition. The church's own guide claims that the font is Saxon and came from the earlier Saxon church.

=== The nave ===
The nave is 30 ft 11 in (9.4 m) long by 18 ft 5 in (5.6 m) wide at the east end and 18 ft 0 in (5.5 m) at the west.

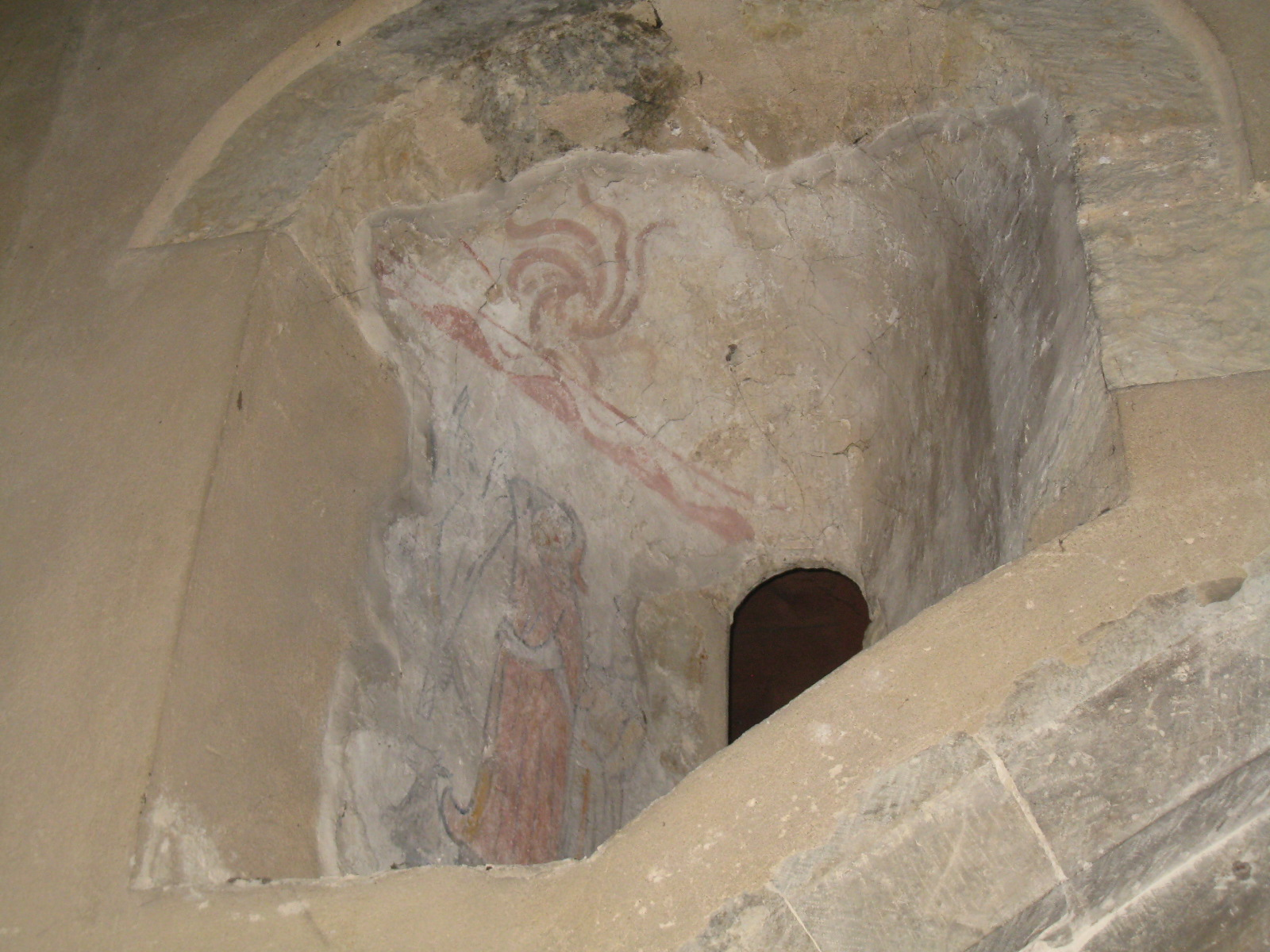
Remnants of 13th-century paintings

The nave is separated from the south aisle by a two-bay arcade, built into the existing walls in the early 14th century, with a single octagonal pier and wide double-chamfered arches. The pier has a square base and an "undersized" moulded impost and is slightly higher than the responds, which are square, with the arches "dying away" into them at a low level.

Above the western arch is the remains of an 11th-century window. This had been blocked off when the south aisle and arches were constructed in the early 14th century and was restored in 1896. On the south side, on what was originally the exterior wall, it has an arched lintel and jambs of two very wide blocks each and no sill. The aperture is about 9 in (0.2 m) wide and 2 ft 0 in (0.6 m) high. The north face is widely splayed, with a round head of three long voussoirs; the window is about 3 ft 5 in (1.0 m) high to the springing. On the eastern splay of the window are remnants of a wall painting, which have been dated to 1220. The painting is part of the Christmas story and shows the shepherds with a dog looking up to the Star of Bethlehem. Above them are the arms of an angel pointing to the star and holding a palm branch.

The nave is separated from the north aisle by a three-bay arcade, built in 1865. The two piers are octagonal as are the responds, and being closer together than those on the south side, the arches have a much more pronounced point.

The western door to the nave, which now permits entry to the tower, is probably the original west door of the church. It has a plain pointed head within a semi-elliptic archway.

The nave roof is mostly modern although the three tie-beams are older, possibly 11th- or 12th-century. The westernmost tie-beam may once have supported a bell-cote before the tower was built in the early 14th century.

=== The chancel ===
The chancel is 15 ft 0 in (4.6 m) long and 14 ft 0 in (4.3 m) wide.

The chancel arch dates to the 11th century and is the oldest part of the church still visible. The head is of two rings, with plaster or rubble filling. It has 14 small, variously sized voussoirs and has become slightly flattened as a result of subsidence with the jambs not quite vertical. The jambs are square-cut, each having five upright and flat slabs of similar heights, two per course. At the top of each upright, there is a 7 in (0.2 m) plain chamfered impost. The arch is 6 ft 6 in (2.0 m) to the imposts; it is 8 ft 6 in (2.6 m) wide and11 ft 4 in (3.5 m) to the crown. The jambs are 2 ft 5 in (0.7 m) thick.

The chancel was separated from the nave by a rood screen but this has now been removed.

Behind the altar is the east window of the church. The original from the 14th century was removed during the repairs to the chancel in 1896 and was stored in the garden of the rectory in Bell Lane. The new window was set about 2 ft 0 in (0.6 m) higher than the original, to accommodate a reredos (since removed) and is thus unusually high. The present window has three trefoil-headed lights under a pointed arch.

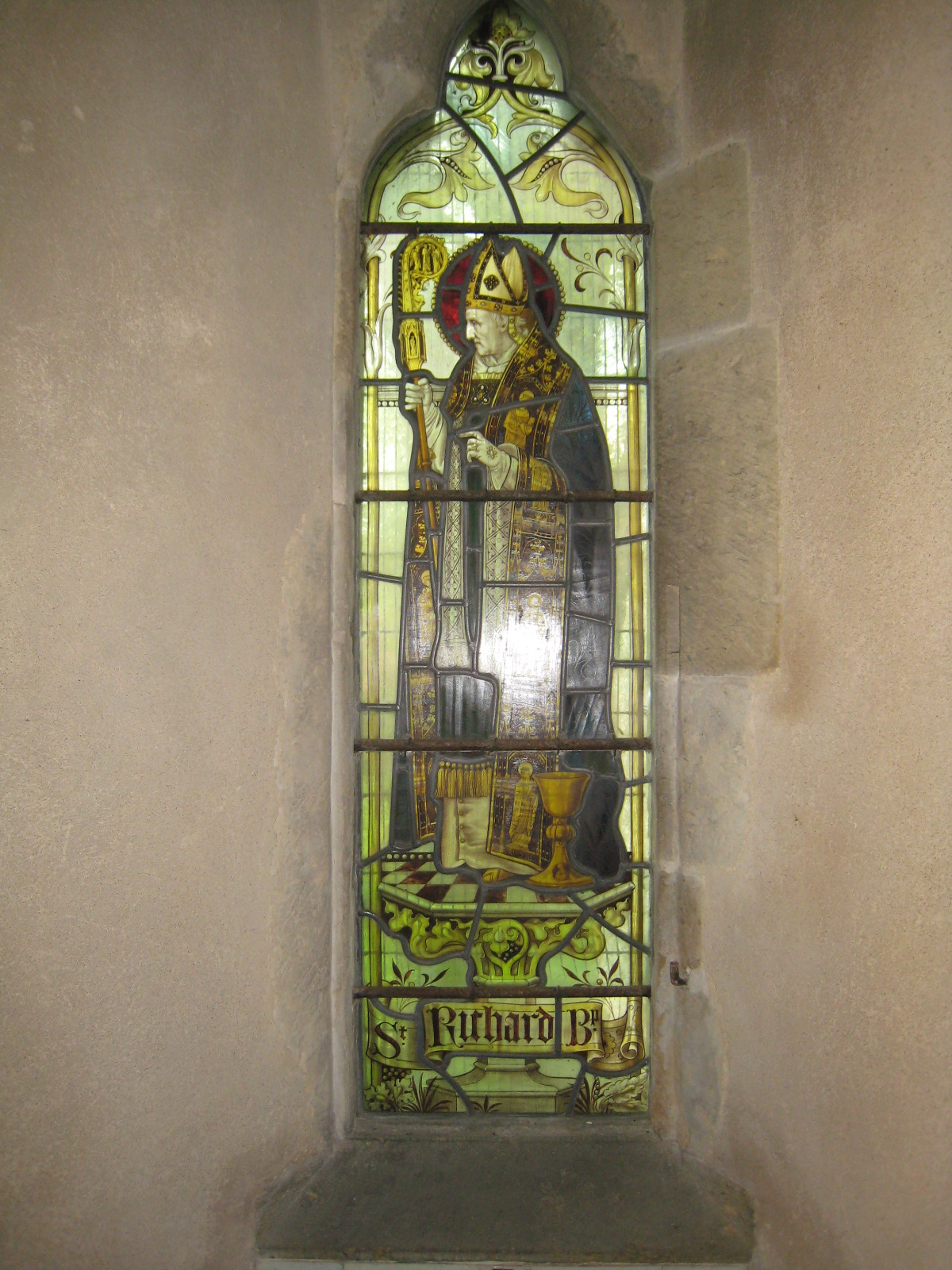
The memorial window to Revd. Ash

On both the north and south walls of the chancel can be seen the remains of the original Norman windows, which were exposed during the 1896 improvements. In each case, three of the western jamb stones and two voussoirs are now visible. The present chancel windows are slightly to the west of the originals and are 14th-century single light windows with ogee trefoil heads.

At the western end of the south wall of the chancel, there is a second lower window which dates from the 13th century, with a pointed trefoil head and rebated jambs. This contains the only stained glass in the church, the work of James Powell, installed in 1896 to commemorate Revd. Richard Drummond Ash. The image represents Richard de Wych who was Bishop of Chichester from 1244 to 1253, although the face is that of Richard Durnford, the Bishop of the Diocese who had recently died. The inscription below the window reads:

In memory of Richard Robert Drummond Ash, M.A. rector of this parish for 28 years A.D. 1860–1888. He entered into rest June 14, 1896 aged 67. In the same year, when the chancel was restored, this window was dedicated by his friends and parishioners.

On the northern wall of the chancel is the door to the vestry. This dates from 1896 and has a plain pointed arch. To the right of this, is the Easter sepulchre. This has a large central finial above the inner trefoil-headed arch, with smaller pinnacles at the sides emerging from carved heads. This dates from about 1300 and is possibly the oldest in Sussex.

Set in the north-east corner of the chancel is the remains of an 11th-century gravestone which was discovered in the foundations of the chancel north wall during the 1896 re-building. It is 2 ft 0 in (0.6 m) wide and 2 ft 5 in (0.7 m) tall. On its face is a Y-shaped cross within a rectangular border.

On the east wall of the chancel is an aumbry, behind a brass door engraved with the cross. Above this is a candelabra indicating that the Blessed Sacrament is preserved in the aumbry. On the altar table is the altar cross which is made of iron, gilded and inlaid with mosaic and mother of pearl; this dates from 1896. The earlier altar cross is now above the western door in the nave.

On the south wall of the chancel is a triangle-headed piscina dating from the early 14th century; this was uncovered during the 1896 restoration.

Also in the chancel are grave stones for three incumbents of the parish. On the east wall is the grave stone to James Maidlow, who died in 1791, aged 62. He was curate for 24 years and the Latin text claims that "he was Happily endowed with the finest ability". On the south wall are the grave stones to Melmoth Skynner, who was vicar for 24 years and died in 1822 at the age of 90, while the other, with a Latin inscription, is in memory of James Barker, who was vicar for 28 years and also Archdeacon of Chichester. He died in 1736, aged 71. According to the Latin inscription: "He was content with his lot, yet not unworthy of a better one".

=== The north aisle ===
The north aisle, which is separated from the nave by the three-bay arcade, was added in 1865. On the north wall, there are three two-light windows with pointed trefoil heads and a similar taller window in the west wall.

At the eastern end is situated the small church organ. This has a single keyboard and three stops, but over 150 pipes.

=== The tower and bells ===
The tower is at the western end of the church and was added in the early 14th century. In the tower is a cupboard with a wooden door; this comes down to rest on a beam to form a flat surface. The cupboard was used to store the parish registers.

The church has three bells. The oldest (No. 2) was cast in the bell foundry at Wokingham in 1420 and is inscribed "Sancte Johannis Ora Pro Nobis". The bell has a broad face, with a cross of four fleur de lys, surmounted by a crown and coin. Bell No. 1, which is similar in design to bell No. 2, was cast by Roger Landen of Wokingham in 1448 and is inscribed "Sancte Caterina Ora Pro Nobis". The third bell was hung in 1616 and was made by Thomas Wakefield of Chichester. This is inscribed "1W RK 1616 T & W".

== Incumbents ==
The following are known to have served as vicar or rector to Cocking church:

- Roger Andrewes (1574–1635), Archdeacon of Chichester: vicar from 1606 to 1609
- Josiah Pleydell (1641–1707), Archdeacon of Chichester: vicar from 1683 to 1707
- James Barker (1667–1736), Archdeacon of Chichester: vicar from 1708 to 1736
- Thomas Hutchinson (1698–1769): vicar from 1737 to his death in 1769
- Sir John Ashburnham, 7th Baronet (1770–1854): vicar from 1796 to 1798
- Sir Derwent Kermode (1898–1960), who was the British ambassador to Indonesia (1950–1953) and the Czech Republic (1953–1955): rector from 1959 to 1960.

== See also ==
- Grade I listed buildings in West Sussex
- List of current places of worship in Chichester (district)

== Gallery ==
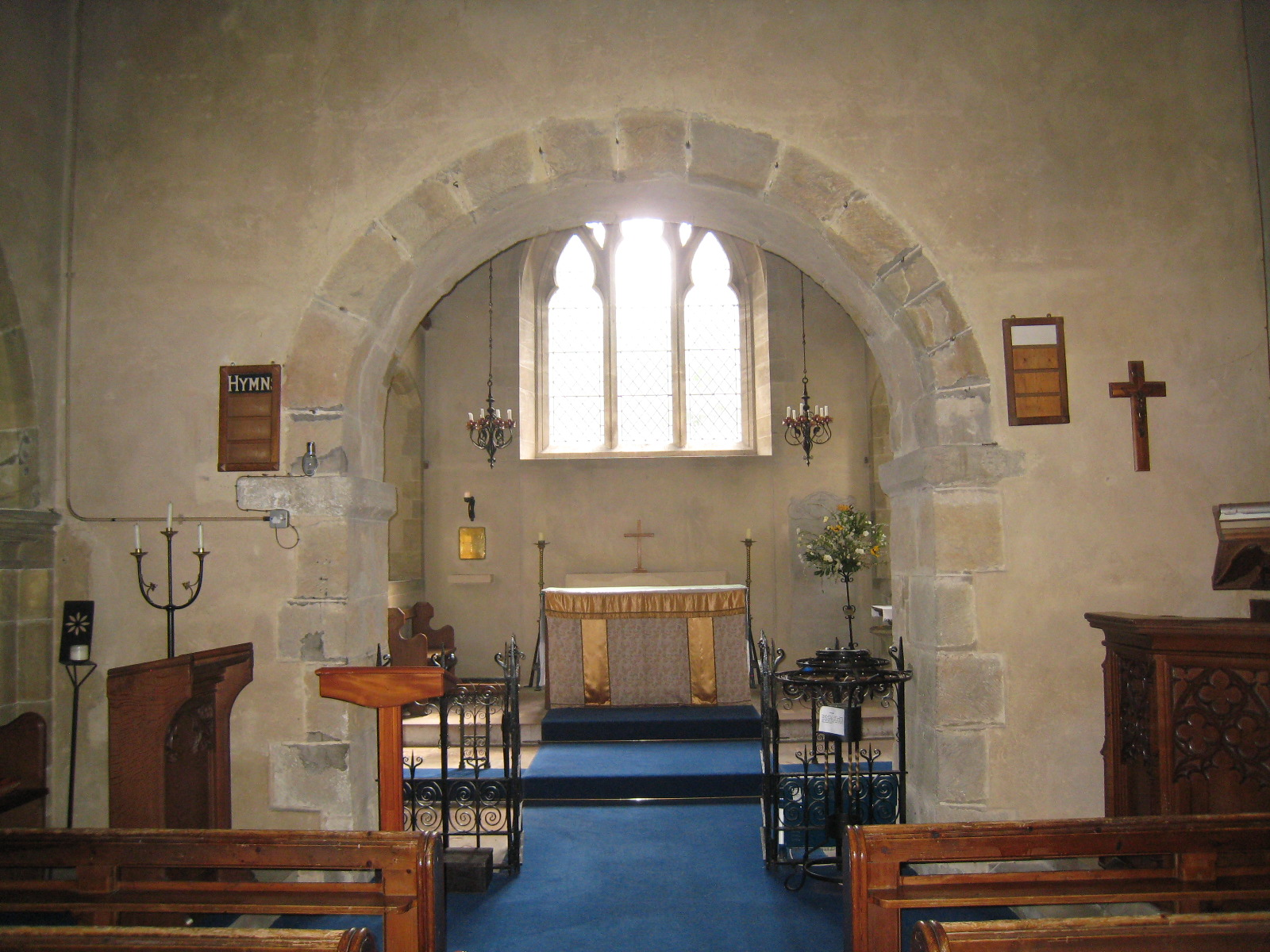
View of the chancel arch and main altar

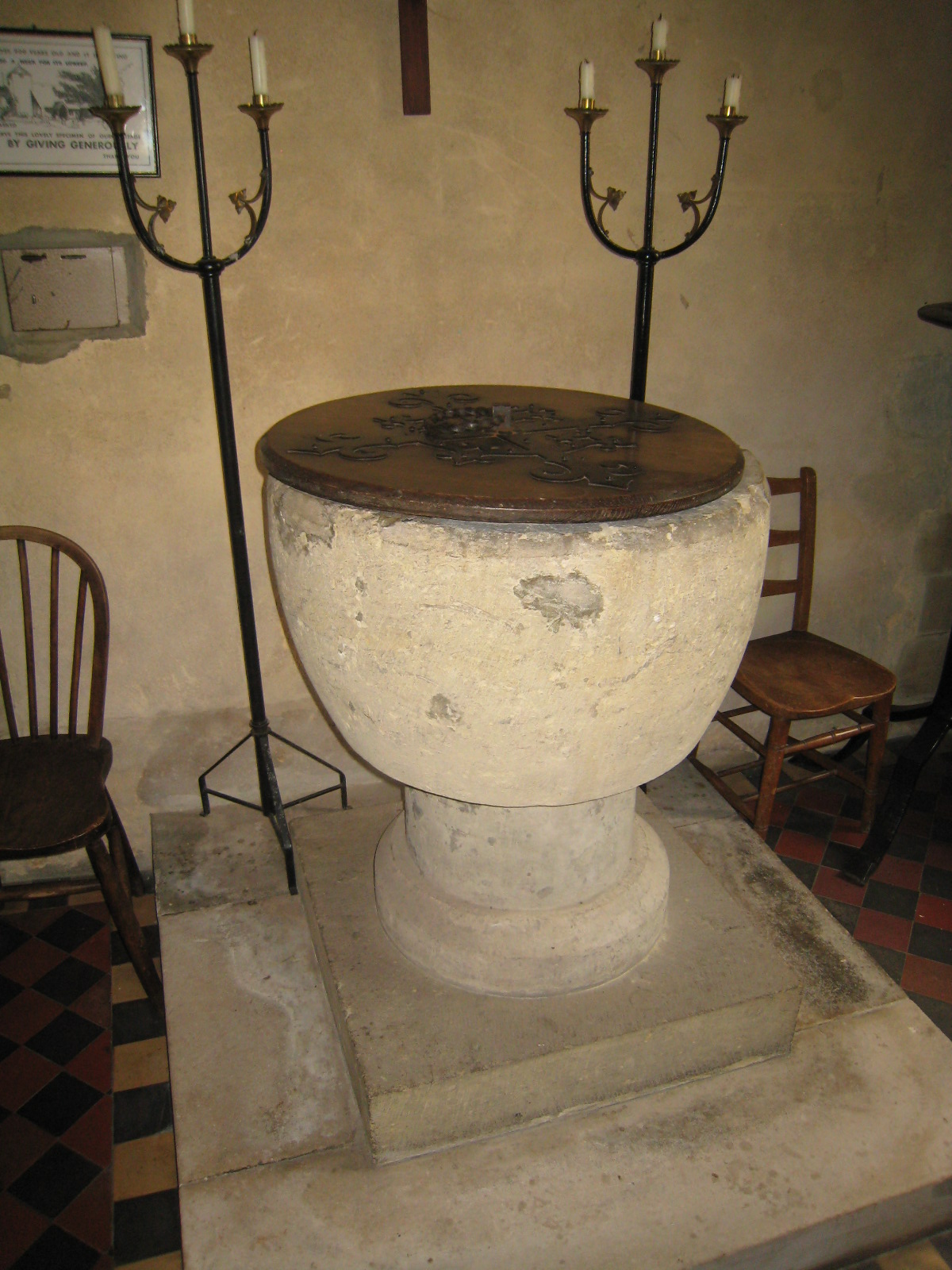
The font

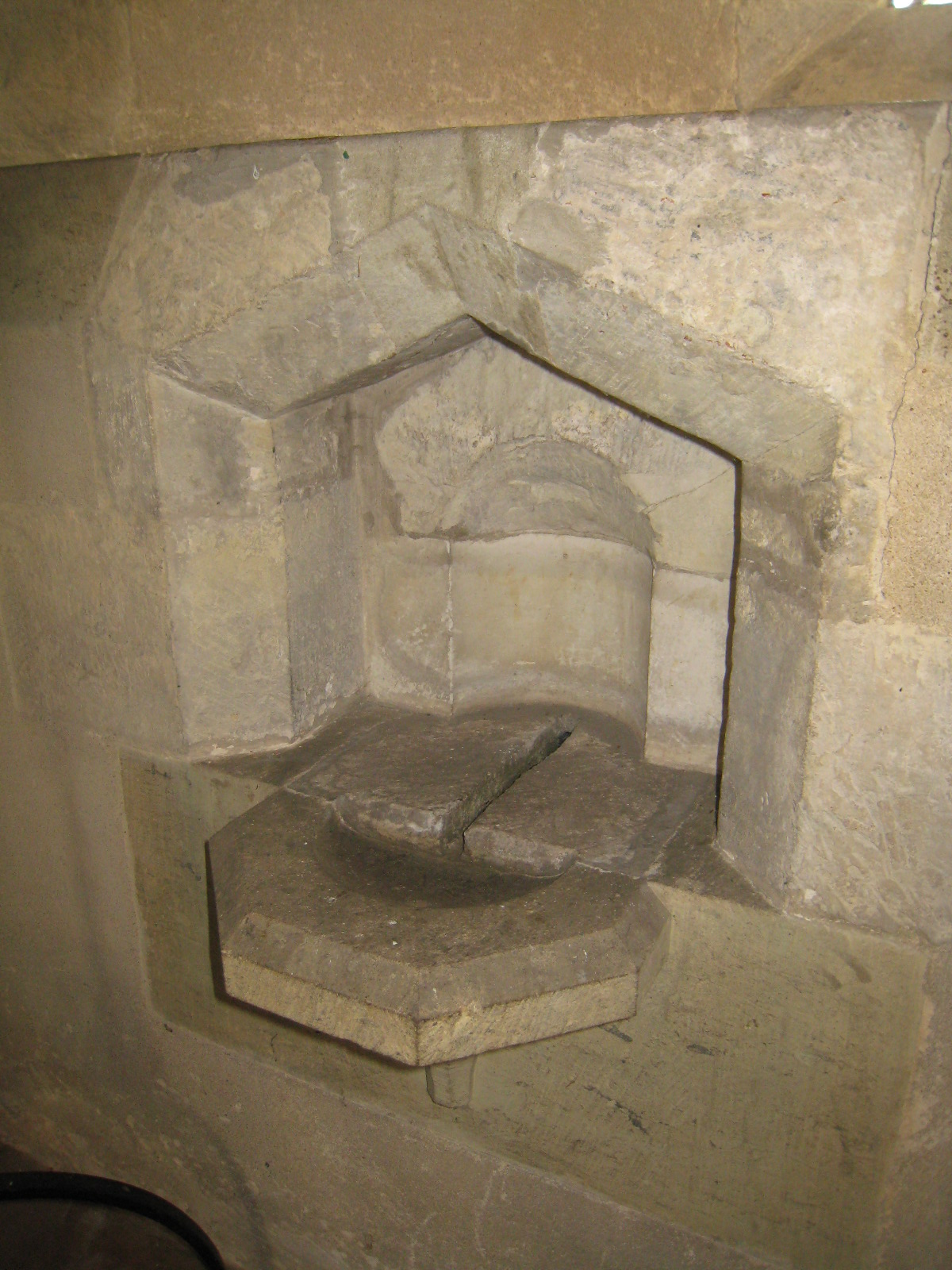
The piscina in the chancel

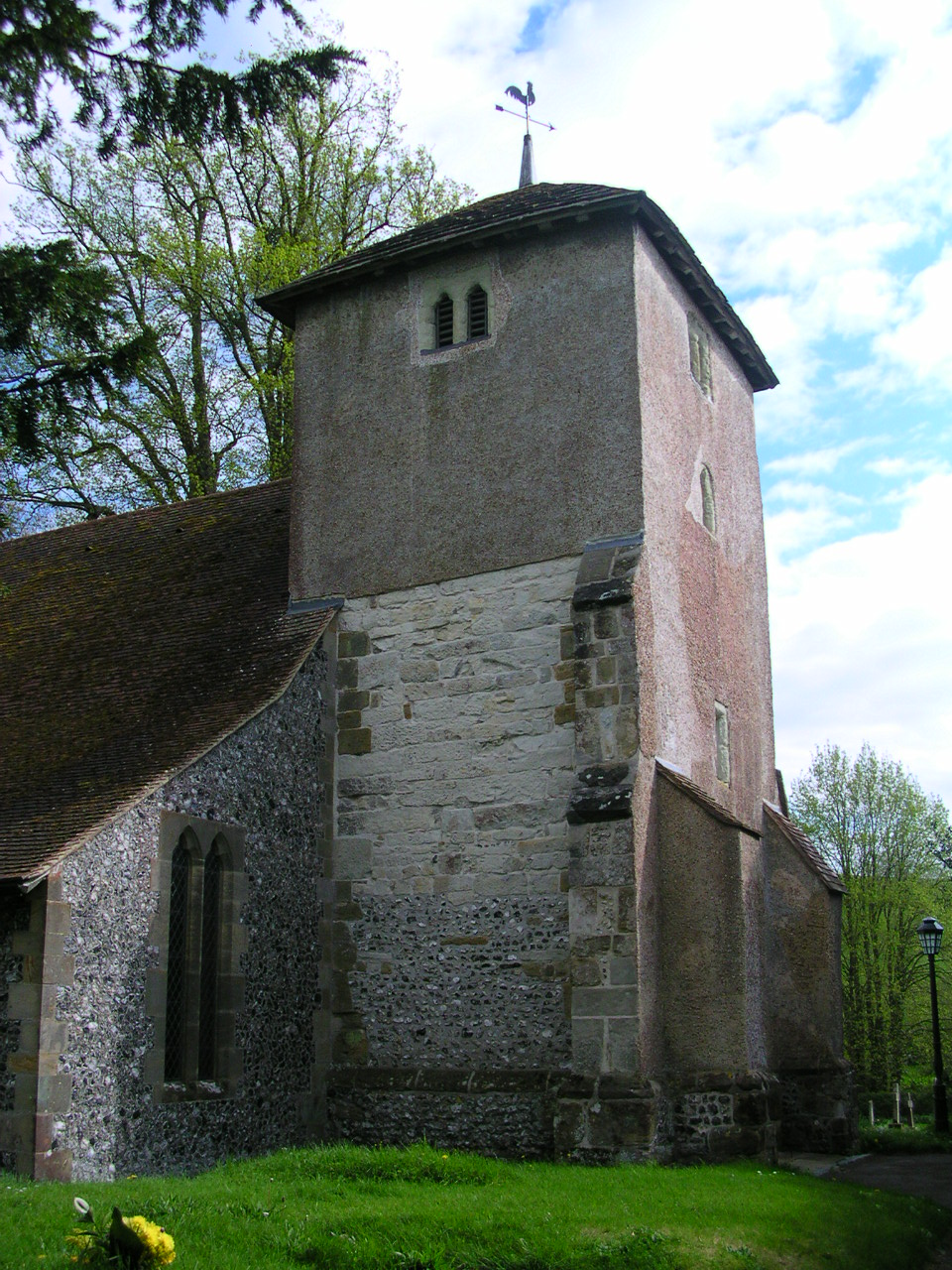
The north face of the tower

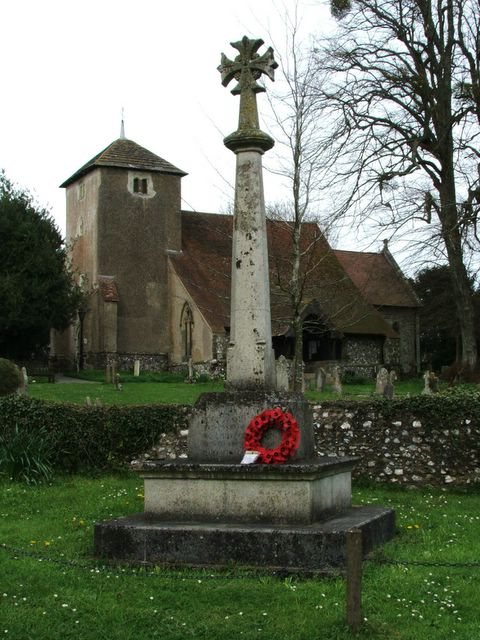
The war memorial in front of the church

== Bibliography ==
- Cocking History Group (2005). A Short History of Cocking. Midhurst: Studio Gallery Publications. ISBN 0-9542357-1-1.
- Fisher, Ernest (1970). The Saxon Churches of Sussex. Newton Abbot: David & Charles. ISBN 0715349465.
- Pevsner, Nikolaus; Nairn, Ian (1965). Buildings of England: Sussex. Penguin Books. ISBN 978-0300096774.
- Randall, Henry; Bradley, Colin (2002) [1901]. Cocking Parish Church: Notes for the Information of Visitors. Cocking Church.
