= Coultershaw Wharf and Beam Pump =

Rural community in West Sussex, England

Coultershaw Beam Pump
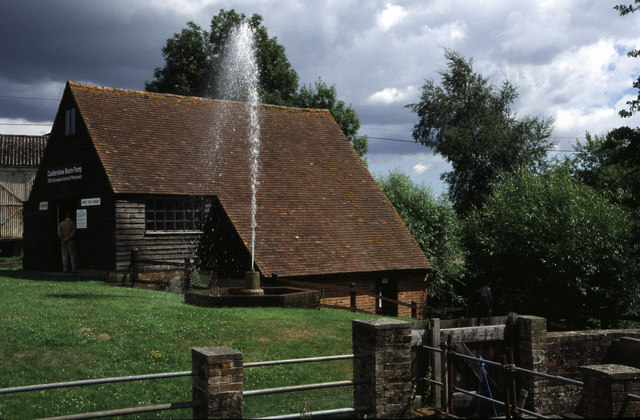
- The Coultershaw Beam Pump fountain pump output on a working day

- Location within West Sussex
- 50°57′57.5″N 0°37′2″W
- Location: Petworth, West Sussex, England
- OS grid reference: SU9720819409

History
- Built: 1782
- Built for: 3rd Earl of Egremont

Site notes
- Elevation: 9 metres (30 ft)
- Restored: 1980
- Restored by: Sussex Industrial Archaeology Society
- Owner: The Coultershaw Trust

Scheduled monument
- Official name: Coultershaw Beam Pump
- Reference no.: 1005817

Coultershaw Bridge is a rural community situated 1.5 mi (2.4 km) south of the town Petworth in West Sussex, England where the A285 road from Petworth to Chichester crosses the River Rother.

Between 1792 and 1888, there were also wharves and a lock at Coultershaw on the Rother Navigation. Until the 1970s, a water mill stood on the river housing a beam engine which was originally installed in 1782 by the 3rd Earl of Egremont to pump water from the river to Petworth and his home at Petworth House. Following the demolition of the mill, the Coultershaw Beam Pump was restored to working order and is now a scheduled monument, which is open to the public on summer weekends.

== Etymology ==
In Saxon times the locality was known as "Cuóheres Hóh", meaning "Couhere's spur of land". By 1240, the name was given as "Cuteresho". Since then, the name has been spelt in many different ways, including "Cowtershall" (1535), "Cowtershawe" (1564), "Coultersole" (1716), "Cowdersole" (1779), "Cowters Hall" (1795) and, finally by its present name in 1800.

== Coultershaw Mill ==
The Domesday Book, compiled in 1086 records a mill at Petworth, which almost certainly referred to the mill at Coultershaw.

By the mid-13th century, the mill was owned by the Percy family, and in July 1240, William de Percy endowed the priory at Shulbrede near Linchmere with the mill at "Cutersho" while retaining the right to "the free grinding of all kinds of corn which shall be used in his house at Pettewurth". He also granted the priory the right to take earth from his land near the mill to repair the mill-pool when necessary, and granted that the "villeins" at Tillington and Petworth should give the prior up to three days' aid each year to repair the mill-pool. In consideration for the transfer, the prior was to pay Percy or his heirs two marks of silver each year until such time as Percy gave "ten librates of land in a suitable place in Sussex or Yorkshire" to the prior, after which the mill would revert to Percy.

The Percy family failed to exercise their right to reclaim ownership of the mill; in the Sussex Hundred Rolls of 1275, the mill was shown as belonging to the priory, with an annual value of £10. In 1291, in Taxatio Ecclesiastica (a survey of temporal property held by religious bodies granted to King Edward I by Pope Nicholas IV), the mill (now valued at £2 per annum) was recorded as at "Catesstowe" or "Cotestoke" while in 1380 it was recorded as at "Codestowe". When the priory was surveyed for Valor Ecclesiasticus (a survey of the finances of the church made in 1535 on the orders of King Henry VIII), the mill (now at "Cowtershall") was still recorded among the priory's assets, with an annual value of 53s 4d.

Following the Dissolution of the Monasteries in 1536, the priory and its possessions were granted by charter by King Heny VIII to Sir William FitzWilliam, 1st Earl of Southampton. The mill subsequently reverted to the Percy family. Lady Elizabeth Percy inherited the Petworth properties on the death of her father in 1670. In 1682, she married Charles Seymour, 6th Duke of Somerset, and so became Duchess of Somerset, with the Duke thus becoming the owner of the Petworth estate.

In 1703 the court roll refers to a "mill called Coutershoal Mill" being kept up "for the conveniency and service of the tennants and that it is the custom of this manor for the tennants to grind at the said mill".

The Duke of Somerset died in 1750, followed two years later by his son, the 7th Duke. On the death of the 7th Duke, his nephew, Charles Wyndham, inherited Petworth and the title Earl of Egremont.

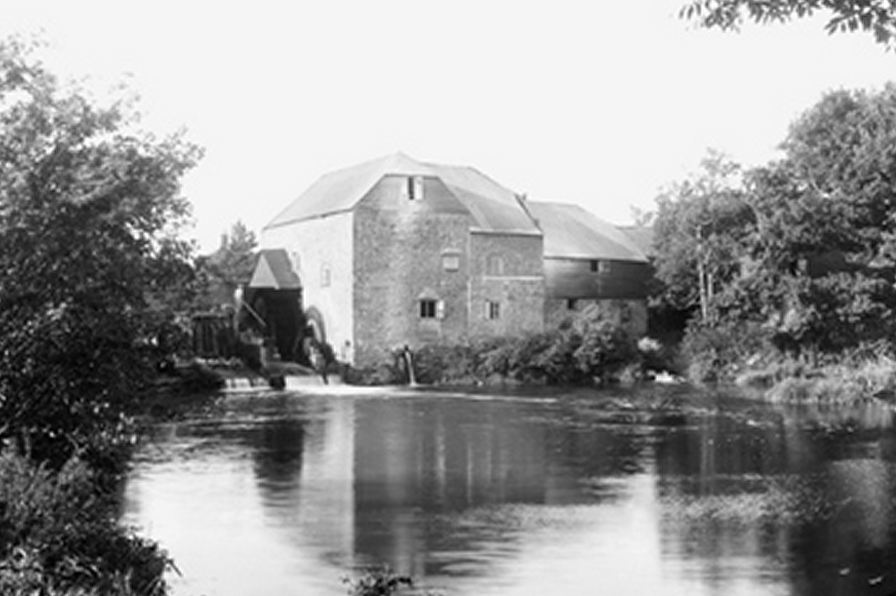
Coultershaw Mill, 1906

There were two corn mills and a malt mill recorded on the site in 1534. The corn mill was modernised in 1910, with the wheel being replaced by a water turbine and the grindstones being replaced by steel rollers. An engine house was built in 1919 to provide supplementary power for when there was little water in the river, and a second turbine was added in 1922. The mill was destroyed by fire in 1923, and an unattractive steel-framed concrete building replaced it.

From the early 20th century until the mill was closed in 1972, the mill was operated by the Gwillim family, who also operated North Mill in Midhurst. Correspondence relating to the tenancy of Coultershaw Mill by the Gwillim family from 1905 to 1930 is held in the West Sussex Record Office, as is a copy of the final lease drawn up in August 1968 between "John Edward Reginald, Baron Egremont, of Petworth House" and "J. Gwillim Limited, Coultershaw"; this was for a period of twenty years at an initial rent of £1,250 per annum.

In 1930, John Gwillim and Novadel Limited registered a patent for "Improvements in plansifters and the like" (United Kingdom Patent GB353145). A "plansifter" was "a stack of sieves of decreasing mesh size that separate particles by size" for use in milling operations.

In 1992, Phyllis Catt, the daughter of John Gwillim published "A Miller's Daughter" in which she recorded her experiences living at the mill and North Mill, Midhurst to a background of the "rumble of machinery and the rush of water".

Following the death of John Gwillim in 1972, the mill ceased to operate and the building was demolished the following year, although the beam pump and water wheel were saved for restoration.

== History of Petworth's water supply ==
Before the supply of piped water to the town, the residents of Petworth obtained water from springs to the east of the town, such as the Virgin Mary Spring, from which water can still be drawn.

The first piped water supply to Petworth was established in the early 16th century by Rev. John Edmunds, the local Rector, who installed a 3 in (76 mm) diameter lead pipe from springs, at the junction of the lower greensand and Atherfield clay, in Boxgrove Paddock, about 1 mi (1.6 km) west of the town, to supply the Manor House (now Petworth House) and conduits in the town. The main pipe led to a stone reservoir on the north side of the churchyard with branches to points in the lower levels of the town. By 1575, the pipes were severely decayed and to help pay for their maintenance, Henry, 8th Earl of Northumberland endowed the town with the 7 acres (2.8 ha) Conduit Field, east of Hungers Lane on the south side of the road to Midhurst.

In 1625, there were fountains outside the church and in the Market Square and conduits in the town, including outside "The George" inn at the north end of South Street (now Pound Street). By this time, the revenue from the lands at the Conduit Field were insufficient to finance the maintenance of the pipes and agreement was reached between the townspeople and the earl that, in return for receiving back the Conduit Field, he would carry out the necessary repairs and be responsible for the ongoing upkeep of the pipes with two wardens being chosen, one by the Earl and one by the town, who would supervise the maintenance of the supply.

By the late 18th century, the conduit system was inadequate to meet the needs of the town and in 1782, George, 3rd Earl of Egremont installed a pump at Coultershaw Mill on the River Rother 1.5 mi (2.4 km) south of the town. The pump was driven by an undershot wooden wheel and forced the water along a main pipe of 3 in (76 mm) inside bore to feed two reservoirs, one in Petworth Park, on Lawn Hill and the other in the south-east corner of the town to the west of Percy Row near the old gaol. The supply was kept separate from the supply from the conduit system, as the river water contained suspended fine sediment of greensand and other pollutants and was not considered fit for human consumption.

Connection to the new supply required approval from the Earl of Egremont; despite this, there were a large number of unauthorised connections although the system was not intended to be used for drinking, being untreated river water. In 1839, it was recorded that the pipes from Coultershaw supplied 7 public and 146 private stopcocks in Petworth, including the brewery, malt house, a windmill and the Swan Inn.

In 1874, Dr Charles Kelly reported to Lord Leconfield on the state of the town's water supply and the health of the townspeople. His report showed that the town's sewage was drained onto fields to the south of the town, where it flowed along ditches into the River Rother, about 1 mi (1.6 km) upstream of the pump at Coultershaw; thus the water that was extracted from the river and pumped to the town was polluted by human waste. Although there was still a plentiful supply of clean drinking water from the 17th century system, its distribution around the town was inadequate with only a small number of cisterns. As a result, the inhabitants of the town found it more convenient to obtain water from the river system rather than make the long walk to and from the conduits. Dr Kelly recommended that a new system should be installed to obtain fresh water from three springs in the neighbourhood and that sewage should be prevented from entering the river to avoid the risk of cholera or typhoid.

Although Dr Kelly's proposals were not immediately acted upon, in 1882 agreement was reached between Lord Leconfield and the Rural Sanitary Authority that a new water supply should be obtained from springs at Gorehill to the south-east of the town. A new pumping station was built, under consulting engineers Hassard & Tyrrell, at Haslingbourne from where the water was pumped by a 6 h.p. Mason & Weyman steam engine with a Cornish boiler, through 5 in (127 mm) pipes to a new reservoir near the Cottage Hospital, on high ground a mile east of the town. The supply to the town from the new reservoir was connected to the existing river mains which were plugged so that only spring water could circulate through the town, while the water from the river continued to supply the reservoir in Petworth Park.

== Coultershaw Wharf ==
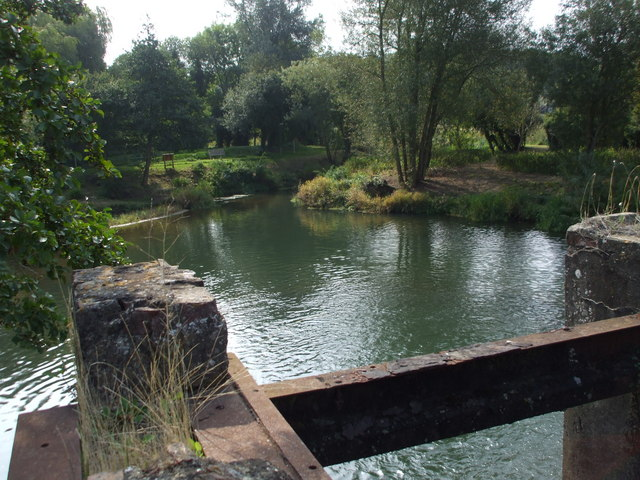
The former mill pond at Coultershaw with the site of the wharves to the rear (September 2009)

Between 1791 and 1794, the Third Earl of Egremont financed the upgrading of the River Rother and the construction of a series of locks, to make the river navigable for commercial traffic between the River Arun at Pulborough and Midhurst.

Digging the route for the new Rother Navigation began in August 1791 at Stopham, where, by use of the River Arun, it connected with the Wey and Arun Canal and thus to London. By the end of July 1792, the excavations had been completed to Coultershaw Wharf, where the canal made use of the millstream, which here ran nearly due south, with the main stream of the river running in a large meander to the west with a weir at its head. At the mill itself, the fourth lock was constructed a few yards to the west of the mill. By June 1793, commercial traffic had started to use the canal with timber being carried from Coultershaw to the Arun in August 1793. In November 1794, the first barge loads of chalk arrived at the newly built kiln at Coultershaw, which was situated to the east of the road about a hundred yards north of the mill.

Until 1800, the turnpike from Chichester to Petworth descended Duncton Hill before crossing the River Rother at Rotherbridge, half a mile north-west of Coultershaw. The Petworth Turnpike Trustees, including the Third Earl of Egremont, suspected that William Warren, the miller at Coultershaw, was allowing his "friends" to cross the river by using the mill bridge, thus avoiding the toll for use of the turnpike. By an act of Parliament in 1800, Lord Egremont paid for the construction of a new bridge at Coultershaw and the re-routing of the turnpike direct from there to Petworth. As a result, the former twin-arched bridge at Rotherbridge was pulled down and the stone was used to build the new bridge at Coultershaw with a toll-house on the west bank of the river.

Although Coultershaw was about 1.5 mi (2.4 km) south of Petworth, it was the nearest wharf on the navigation and quickly eased the transport of fertiliser, coal and building materials to the town and surrounding areas and improved access to wider markets for agricultural, timber and other products. The wharf at Coultershaw was the busiest on the navigation, handling over half the navigation's traffic. In 1820, 1,683 tons of coal were carried to Coultershaw.

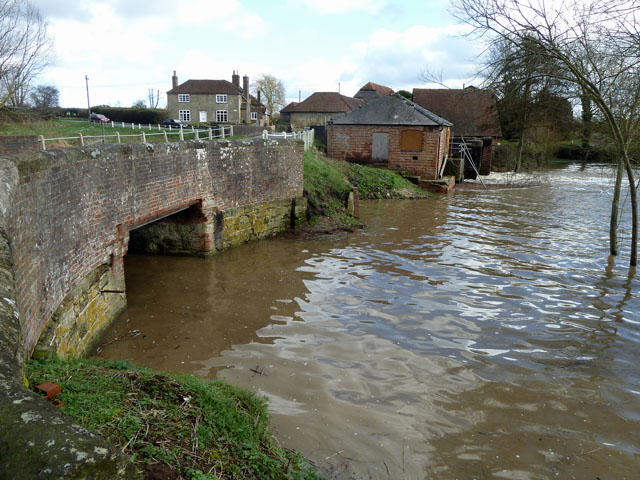
River Rother at Coultershaw in flood. The near bridge is that for the lock cut of the derelict Rother Navigation, but it has been lowered. Immediately above the bridge, out of sight, is what is left of the lock. (February 2011)

By 1808, the wharf stretched over both sides of the river. "Big Wharf" on the north (east) bank, contained a small warehouse (leased to William Upton, a Petworth merchant, until 1840), a blacksmith's shop and shoeing shed (leased to Michael Ford), and six coal pens. A variety of huts and storehouses also stood on "Little Wharf" on the south (west) bank. Adjacent to the wharf stood the flour mill (now leased to William Dale), with Lord Egremont's limekilns nearby.

The navigation was at its busiest from 1823 to 1863, with the annual tonnage never falling below 10,000. In 1843, the quantity of coal carried to Coultershaw had risen to 2,000 tons with a total of 7,000 tons of merchandise passing through Coultershaw that year, which represented 55% of the total traffic on the navigation.

In October 1859, the London Brighton and South Coast Railway opened the railway line from Pulborough to Petworth with the new Petworth station being sited half a mile south from Coultershaw, 2 mi (3.2 km) in all from the town centre. At first, the railway had little effect on the navigation until, in 1863, the Arun Valley Line was extended south from Pulborough to Arundel and Ford where it connected to the south coast mainline. Within a year, the navigation had lost 5,000 tons or 40% of its annual traffic. The extension of the railway to Midhurst in 1866, resulted in further loss of traffic, with the canal traffic being restricted to loads, such as large trees, which were too large for the railway.

Commercial traffic continued on the navigation until 1888 although it was only formally abandoned in 1936.

The toll house at Coultershaw was demolished in the late 1870s, although its foundations were still visible on the west side of the canal bridge in the 1950s. The lock and bridge have survived despite being threatened with destruction by the need to widen the narrow bridge carrying the A285 road from Petworth to Chichester.

There are two bridges at Coultershaw wharf: that over the River Rother, built in 1803, still carries the heavy traffic of the A285; the bridge over the former navigation was originally a steep hump back type, but the road bed has since been flattened out.

== Beam pump ==
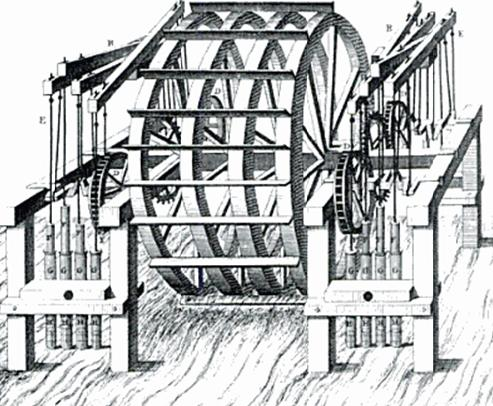
Sorocold's water wheel on the River Thames

The beam pump was installed in the mill in 1782 by the 3rd Earl of Egremont to pump water from the river to Petworth and his home at Petworth House, which was 1.5 mi (2.4 km) north of the mill and more than 150 ft (46 m) higher. The identity of the designer of the pump at Coultershaw is now unknown but, as it is very similar in design to the pumps installed by George Sorocold under London Bridge in 1705, it is probable that Lord Egremont was aware of these pumps from his visits to London.

Similar pumps were installed nearby in West Sussex at about the same time, at Uppark and Bignor Park, and in the 1840s at Woolbeding, although these as well as those at London Bridge have now been destroyed, leaving the pump at Coultershaw as the only surviving example, although a project to restore the pump at Woolbeding commenced in 2014.

The pump was operated by a breastshot water wheel which was direct coupled to a three-throw crankshaft (cast in 1912) which swung three 12 ft 6 in (3.8 m) long beams pivoted at one end through connecting rods. The pump plunger rods connected to the outer free ends of the beams travel in a substantially straight-line motion; these were fitted with back to back 6 in (150 mm) diameter leather cups and non-return valves made from leather flaps. The pump has three cylinders with a 6.5 in (165 mm) bore and a stroke of 13 in (330 mm). The pump could produce an operating pressure of in excess of 75 psi (520 kPa).

The water was drawn from the main culvert feeding the wheel by means of a vertical oak penstock, through a 4 in (100 mm) diameter cast iron pipe, and delivered through a 3 in (80 mm) diameter cast iron pipe to the reservoirs at Petworth. At a later date, a compressed air vessel was installed in the delivery line to reduce pressure fluctuations. Between the pump and Petworth, there were a number of non-return valves. At its peak, the pump could deliver water at the rate of 20,000 imp gal (91,000 L; 24,000 US gal) per day, or "a hogshead a minute".

The original water wheel was made entirely of wood but was replaced in the mid-19th century by an iron wheel cast at the Chorley Iron Foundry at Cocking. The present wheel has two cast iron spiders with hexagonal centres fixed to a wrought iron shaft. The spiders are 8 ft 6 in (2.6 m) in diameter with oak paddles 16 in (410 mm) deep by 4 ft 6 in (1.4 m) wide, making the overall diameter of the wheel 11 ft 2 in (3.4 m). The alignment between the crankshaft and the waterwheel shaft was not very accurate; to reduce friction, the bearings between the wheel and the pump were left loose. When operating, the pump was very noisy and the clatter could be heard throughout the mill building. Since it has been restored, a flexible coupling has been inserted between the two shafts, thus reducing the amount of clatter.

The pump survived the fire which destroyed the original mill in 1923 and continued to operate in the replacement building until about 1960. Because no other beam pump of similar size and age in working order is known to exist, the restored Coultershaw pump was declared an Ancient Monument in 1980.

== Restoration ==
Although the mill was demolished in 1973, the beam pump and water wheel were saved for restoration, although the sluices and waterwheel paddles needed replacement. In 1976, the Sussex Industrial Archaeology Society received permission from the present Lord Egremont to restore the pump to working order. The restoration was undertaken voluntarily by the society members in order to eventually open the site to the public and was financed by grants from the Historic Buildings Section of the Inspectorate of Ancient Monuments, West Sussex County Council and the Department of the Environment as well as assistance from Lord Egremont, the owner of the land surrounding the installation. Work commenced immediately, and by October a temporary visitor centre was in place and regular fortnightly work sessions were under way.

As the pump installation was below ground level, and the mill having been demolished, the plan was to acquire a barn locally and erect it over the installation. A 100-year-old barn was obtained from the nearby Goodwood estate and erected over the pump both to protect it and to serve as a visitor centre.

By early 1980, the initial phase of the restoration project was completed. On 16 March, the mill wheel was running again for the first time after restoration. Two months later, the wheel, pump and fountain were working together for the first time. On 4 July 1980, the Beam Pump was ceremoniously started by Lord Egremont, in the presence of invited guests including Philip Green, Chairman of West Sussex County Council's Coast and Countryside Committee, and two days later, the first public Open Day was held.

The pump now supplies a fountain outside the visitor centre and can still deliver a "hogshead a minute".

== Visits ==
The museum is open to the public on Sundays and all bank holiday Mondays from April to September. As well as the pump, other exhibits include an hydraulic ram pump, hand pumps and an electrically driven borehole pump. Visitors can also see the mill pond below the sluices, the navigation pool and the former stables for the canal horses.

The River Rother at Coultershaw is popular with anglers and contains large quantities of chub and barbel.

== Recent developments ==
In July 2012, Lord Egremont officially "switched on" the Archimedes' screw water turbine which had been installed into the wheel pit of the former corn mill. The water turbine, which generates "green" electricity, is believed to be the first of its kind in the south east of England. The six-ton screw can develop 65,000 kWh of electricity per annum and is connected to the National Grid. The project was managed by Robin Wilson CBE, the chairman of the Coultershaw Trust, who had been president of the Institution of Civil Engineers in 1991–92.

The trust has continued to improve the facilities at Coultershaw. In July 2013, work was completed on a new boardwalk and footbridge spanning the river and former navigation, thus extending the site area accessible to visitors. The disused lock has now been dammed off and a footpath has been laid within the lock chamber, to enable visitors to walk through and inspect the walls and remaining gate fittings. In December 2013, the boardwalk was seriously damaged by exceptional flooding on the River Rother.

== Points of interest ==
Point	Coordinates (Links to map resources)	OS Grid Ref	Notes
Coultershaw	50.965972°N 0.617222°W	SU97211941	
Shulbrede Priory	51.061716°N 0.750973°W	SU87622989	
Virgin Mary Spring	50.981671°N 0.599408°W	SU98412118	
Boxgrove Paddock	50.987992°N 0.624294°W	SU96652185	
Conduit Field	50.984336°N 0.623048°W	SU96702140	
Lawn Hill (reservoir)	50.990017°N 0.612978°W	SU97442209	
Percy Row (reservoir)	50.984822°N 0.607149°W	SU97862152	
Haslingbourne (pumping station)	50.973885°N 0.602491°W	SU98212031	
Cottage Hospital (reservoir)	50.985246°N 0.590039°W	SU99062159	
Rotherbridge	50.973000°N 0.624800°W	SU96652019	
Uppark water pump	50.966000°N 0.884914°W	SU78401910	Location of pump
Bignor Park	50.928616°N 0.588408°W	SU99301530	Location of pump
Woolbeding House	50.997067°N 0.755915°W	SU87402270	Location of pump
Cocking Foundry	50.959610°N 0.743390°W	SU88241861	

== Bibliography ==
- Calverley, E. L. (October 1904). "The Priory of Shulbred" (PDF). Sussex Archaeological Collections. 47. Sussex Archaeological Society: 1–34. doi:10.5284/1085433.
- Otter, R. A. (1994). Civil Engineering Heritage – Southern England. Thomas Telford Ltd. ISBN 978-0-7277-1971-3.
- Ponsonby, Arthur (1920). "The Priory and Manor of Lynchmere and Shulbrede". Barnicott & Pearce, The Wessex Press.
- Roberts, Gwilym (2006). Chelsea to Cairo: Taylor-made Water Through Eleven Reigns and in Six Continents. ICE Publishing. ISBN 978-0727734112.
- Taylor, J. E.; Jerome, P. A.; Allnutt, A .G. (1979). "Petworth Water Supply" (PDF). Sussex Industrial History. Sussex Industrial Archaeology Society. Archived from the original on 4 March 2016.
- Vine, P.A.L. (1995). London's Lost Route to Midhurst: The Earl of Egremont's Navigation. Sutton Publishing. ISBN 978-0-7509-0968-6.
