= EC Harris =

UK-based construction consultancy and project management firm

EC Harris (UK) Limited
- Company type: Limited Liability Partnership
- Industry: Consultancy, Real Estate
- Founded: 1911
- Founder: Edward Charles Harris
- Headquarters: United Kingdom
- Number of locations: 43
- Area served: Global
- Parent: Arcadis NV
- Website: Homepage

EC Harris Built Asset Consultancy is a construction consultancy and project management firm whose headquarters are in the United Kingdom. It is a key part of Arcadis NV, following the companies' merger in October 2011.

== History ==
Founded in 1911 by Edward Charles Harris, EC Harris began as a multi industry consultancy business. By the 1950s, the business was largely property based, focusing on civil engineering and infrastructure development. It was in 1986 that the company started Europe's first facilities management consultancy services, and in 1996, the business began to offer full life cycle capital project and facilities consultancy.

In 2003, EC Harris became a limited liability partnership (LLP). EC Harris merged with Arcadis NV on 2 November 2011, after a vote of EC Harris' 183 partners on 31 October 2011. This grew the work force EC Harris had access to over 21,000 professionals as a subsidiary of Arcadis. The merger led to an 84% boost in Arcadis' revenues in August 2012.

== Regions ==
=== Europe ===
60% of the company's revenues come from the United Kingdom. In 2007, however, the company began the process of opening new offices in Russia, Latvia, Croatia, Romania, and Turkey, expanding on a presence in eastern Europe they established in the middle of the 1990s. In the United Kingdom, EC Harris issues reports on the efficiency of space development for both private and public industries.

In February 2012, EC Harris warned that the Eurozone crisis would negatively impact the development of office space development in London throughout that decade. They were also a consultant for the 2012 Summer Olympics in London. The company employs the most chartered surveyors in the United Kingdom.

=== Middle East and Asia ===
EC Harris has developed large scale construction complexes in Qatar, Dubai, Egypt, and Saudi Arabia, establishing a presence in the Middle East in the year 2000 after a five decade long absence from the region. They currently have 250 employees between their Dubai and Abu Dhabi offices, as well as offices in Doha, Qatar and Dammam, Saudi Arabia. Projects in the region include the Al Wahda Sports Club's Grand Millennium Al Wahda Hotel, Abu Dhabi's largest hotel complex.

In June 2007, the firm was awarded the management contract for over £19 billion in construction contracts by the government of Dubai, and an £10 billion beach residential and commercial area construction contract by the government of Abu Dhabi. EC Harris issues investment reports on other regions of Asia as well for the wider Middle East, and nations including China.
