= Cocking, West Sussex =

Village and parish in West Sussex, England

Coordinates: 50.9513°N 0.75095°W

Cocking
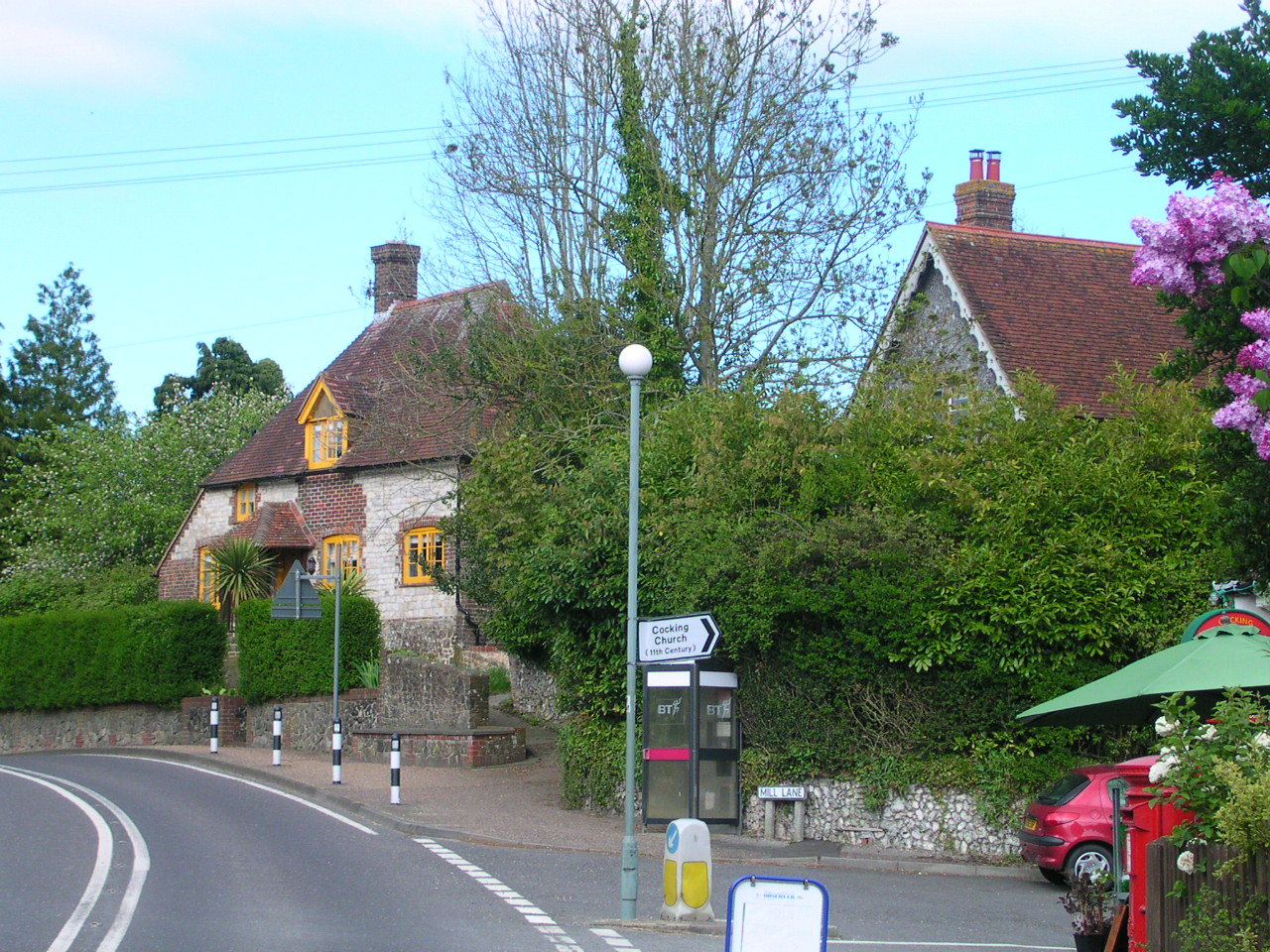
- Cocking village centre

- Location within West Sussex
- Area: 10.16 km^{2} (3.92 sq mi)
- Population: 420 2011 Census
  - Density: 45/km^{2} (120/sq mi)
- OS grid reference: SU878176
  - London: 47 miles (76 km) NE
- Civil parish: Cocking
- District: Chichester
- Shire county: West Sussex
- Region: South East
- Country: England
- Sovereign state: United Kingdom
- Post town: MIDHURST
- Postcode district: GU29
- Dialling code: 01730
- Police: Sussex
- Fire: West Sussex
- Ambulance: South East Coast
- UK Parliament: Chichester
- Website: http://www.cocking.org/

Cocking is a village, parish and civil parish in the Chichester district of West Sussex, England. The village is about three miles (5 km) south of Midhurst on the main A286 road to Chichester.

In the 2001 census there were 190 households in the civil parish with a total population of 459 of whom 223 were economically active. In 2011, the population was 420.

== History and notable buildings ==
Cocking (Cochinges) was listed in the Domesday Book (1086) in the ancient hundred of Easebourne as having 32 households: 18 cottagers, eight smallholders and six slaves; with ploughing land, five mills and a church, it had a value to the lord of the manor of £15.

The 11th century Anglican parish church had no known dedication until 2007 when it was dedicated to St. Catherine of Siena. There was a Congregational Chapel in Crypt Lane, founded in 1806 and rebuilt in 1907, which is now a private house.

In the centre of the village, on the corner of Mill Lane, stands the old school, now a private residence. This was built in 1870 to the designs of architects Richard Carpenter and William Slater. The school has Gothic-style windows and door arches, is faced in flint, and has a red-tiled roof and decorative barge-boards to the gables. The former schoolmaster's house has a distinctive chimney-stack with four outlets.

To the south of the village are the remains of Cocking Lime Works, abandoned in 1999, and the associated chalk pit. To the north are a few traces of the Chorley Iron Foundry, which cast the waterwheels now at the Weald and Downland Open Air Museum and at the Coultershaw Beam Pump.

There still remain in the village some houses of 17th-century origin. In 1931 the population of the village was 431.

There was a Richard Cobden pub in Cocking which closed and became a private residence in the 20th century. Richard Cobden lived in nearby Heyshott. There are 28 listed buildings in the civil parish.

A number of buildings in the village belong to the Cowdray Estate, distinguished by their external woodwork painted yellow.

== Transport ==
A railway once used to serve the area at Cocking Station, on the Chichester to Midhurst line opened in 1881, but was completely closed from 1953. The line passed through Cocking Causeway. The village is on the Stagecoach South No.60 bus route which runs from Midhurst to Chichester on the A286 road, seven days a week.

== Amenities ==
The remaining village pub, formerly The Blue Bell, became a restaurant with accommodation called The Bluebell Inn, and stands on the corner of Bell Lane. The restaurant subsequently closed, but then reopened in 2025 after villagers raised £30,000 to re-establish it as The Blue Bell. It hosts the village shop part-time. The pub fully reopened in September 2026 with local management.

Milestone Garage in the centre of the village has vehicle repair and test centre facilities along with used car sales.

Cocking is on the South Downs Way long-distance footpath.

== Notable people ==
- Philip Jackson, sculptor, lives in Cocking.
