= Arcadis =

Dutch engineering company

Arcadis N.V.
- Type: Naamloze vennootschap
- Traded as: Euronext: ARCAD
- Industry: Engineering
- Founded: 1888
- Headquarters: Zuidas, Amsterdam, Netherlands
- Area served: Worldwide
- Key people: Heather Polinsky (CEO), Simon Crowe (CFO)
- Services: Asset management Construction consulting Engineering design
- Revenue: ▲€3,378.5 million (2021)
- Operating income: ▲€225.9 million (2021)
- Net income: ▲€168.2 million (2021)
- Number of employees: 29,236 (2021)
- Divisions: Arcadis Latin America; Arcadis UK; Arcadis US
- Subsidiaries: CallisonRTKL; EC Harris; Hyder; IBI Group
- Website: www.arcadis.com

Arcadis NV is a global design, engineering and management consulting company based in the Zuidas, Amsterdam, Netherlands. It currently operates in more than 350 offices in 40 countries. The company is a member of the Next 150 index.

Arcadis was founded as the land reclamation specialist Nederlandsche Heidemaatschappij in 1888. Over the following decades, the firm became involved in various development projects, initially with a rural focus. As a consequence of a restructuring in 1972 that divided the company, it became Heidemij. During 1993, the firm merged with the North American business Geraghty & Miller, resulting in its listing on the Nasdaq index.

During 1997, the company adopted its current name, Arcadis; subsidiaries were similarly rebranded. Since 1990, the company has largely expanded itself via a series of acquisitions and mergers, which have allowed it to both expand its presence in existing markets as well as to enter new ones. It performs design and consultancy services on a wide variety of undertakings. Arcadis (either directly or via subsidiaries) has been involved in several high profile construction projects, including London City Airport and the A2 motorway.

== History ==
=== 19th century: foundation ===
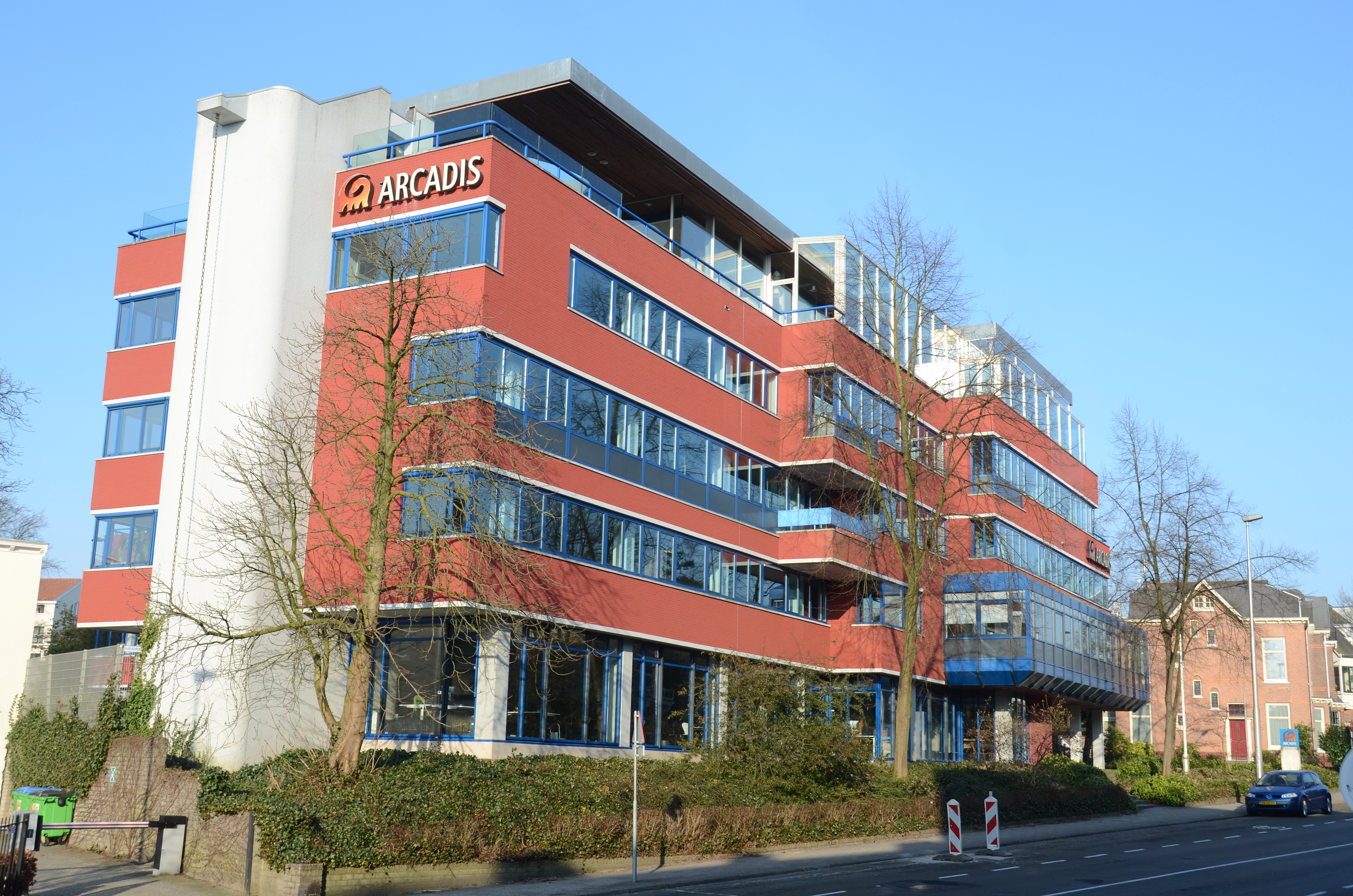
Arcadis consulting building in Arnhem, Netherlands.

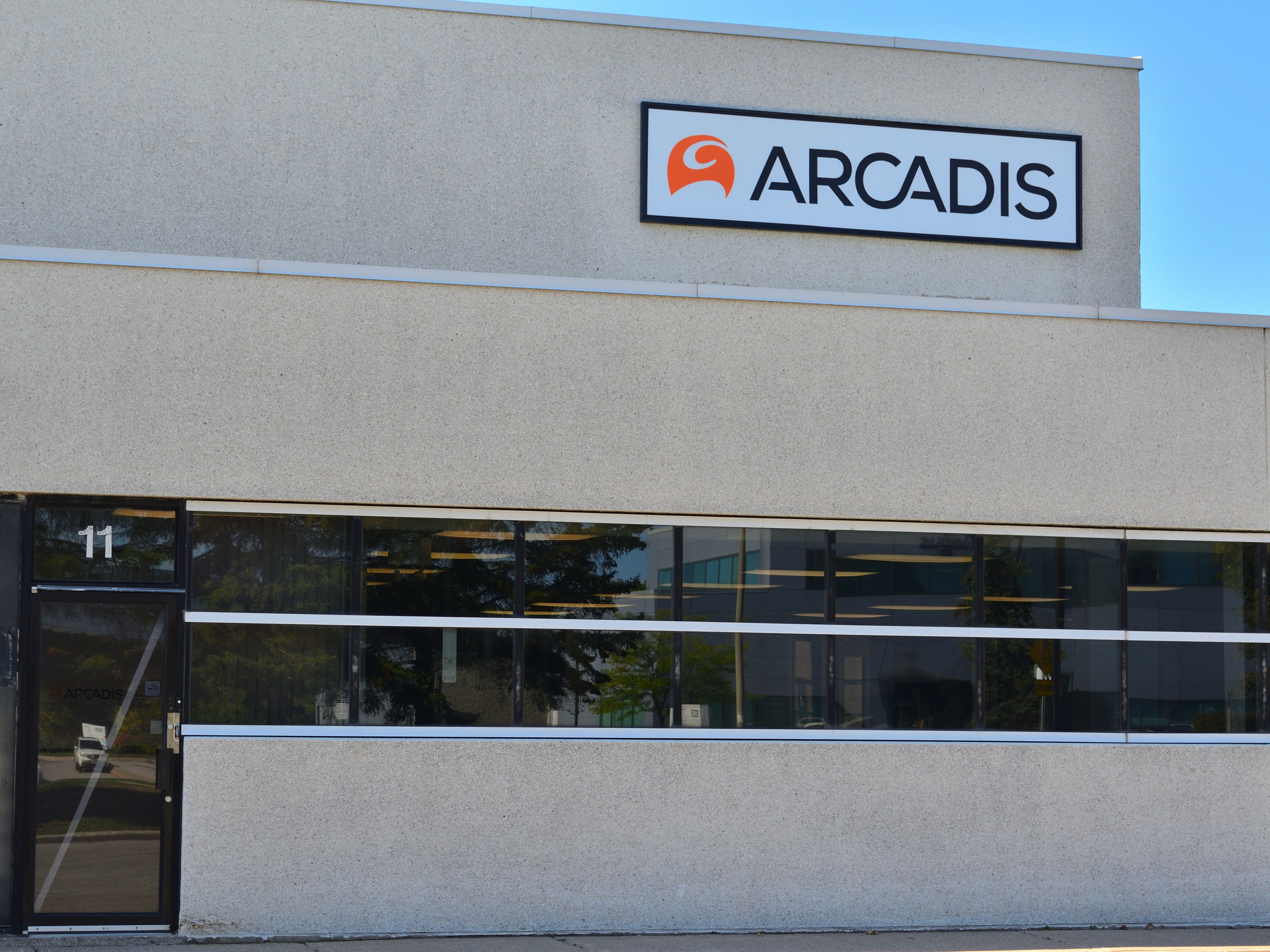
Arcadis in North America

The company has its origins in the Nederlandsche Heidemaatschappij (English: Association for Wasteland Redevelopment), a land reclamation company founded in the Netherlands in 1888. As such, its original business focus was on the encouragement of agricultural development in the Dutch heather lands.

=== 20th century: domestic, US and Brazil expansion ===
In the early 20th century the Heidemaatschappij was involved in all aspects of rural development including irrigation and forestry. In 1972, it was decided to heavily restructure the company, resulting in its division into two separate entities, the Association (or KNHM), which continued the company's traditional activities, and Heidemij, which became the commercial arm.

In 1993, the company merged with Geraghty & Miller, granting the new Arcadis a presence in the North American market and an initial listing on the Nasdaq index. Geraghty and Miller, headquartered in Long Island, New York, was subsequently rebranded as Arcadis North America.

Two years later, Heidemij became a listed company on the Next 150 index. During October 1997, the company opted to rebrand itself, changing its name to Arcadis. Two years later, it established a presence in the Brazilian market via the firm's acquisition of Logos Engenharia.

=== 2000s: UK expansion ===
In June 2005, Axtell Yates Hallett was acquired and became a subsidiary of Arcadis NV, being rebranded as Arcadis UK. AYH was a British quantity surveying firm, founded by Stanley Axtell and his colleagues Messrs Yates and Hallett in the City of London in 1946. Since 1946, Axtell Yates Hallett firm grew steadily and broadened both its service base to include firstly project management and subsequently building surveying and facilities consultancy and its area of operation with the opening of regional and overseas offices in the United Kingdom. Following a period of retrenchment during the economic recession of the beginning of the 1990s, the firm was incorporated as the AYH Partnership in February 1994. One of the firm's last projects was Arsenal F.C.'s Emirates Stadium.

In April 2006, Arcadis acquired Summerfield Robb Clark, a practice in Scotland. Four months later, it also bought Berkeley Consulting, a practice specialising in infrastructure work. Arcadis UK merged with EC Harris on 2 November 2011, after a vote of EC Harris' 183 partners on 31 October 2011. In April 2012, the company acquired Langdon & Seah, an international construction consultancy company.

=== 2010s–2020s: EU and North American expansion ===
In October 2011, Arcadis acquired EC Harris, an international built asset consultancy firm headquartered in the United Kingdom.

In 2012, Arcadis purchased Langdon & Seah, an Asia-based cost and project management consultancy.

In October 2013, Princess Beatrix of the Netherlands visited Arcadis as part of the celebrations for its 125th anniversary.

In October 2014, the company acquired Hyder Consulting, a multi-national advisory and design consultancy specializing in the transport, property, utilities and environmental sectors, for £296 million. Hyder Consulting, now an integrated component of Arcadis can trace its roots back to as early as 1739.

In 2014, Arcadis purchased Callison, an international architecture firm based in Seattle, Washington. In October 2015, a new subsidiary, CallisonRTKL, was formed through the merger of two existing Arcadis subisiaries, Callison and RTKL.

In March 2017, Arcadis announced that its Supervisory Board has nominated Peter Oosterveer as CEO and Chairman of the Arcadis Executive Board.

In 2020, Arcadis acquired Over Morgen, a Dutch development and energy transition consulting firm.

In 2020, Arcadis acquired EAMS Group, a provider of enterprise asset management systems.

In July 2022, Arcadis announced it was acquiring IBI Group, a global architectural and engineering services company based in Canada, to be effective in September 2022.

In October 2022, Arcadis announced CEO Peter Oosterveer’s retirement, and that current Chief Operating Officer Alan Brookes would be nominated as his successor in 2023.

In December 2022, Arcadis acquired DPS Group, an Ireland-based international construction consultancy specializing in life sciences and semiconductor facilities.

In July 2026, Arcadis rejected two takeover bids from WSP. In September 2026, WSP abandoned its takeover bid. Arcadis later said it would sell most of its architecture business and cut 1,000 full-time staff.

== Projects ==
Projects in which Arcadis was involved include:

- London City Airport, completed in 1987
- Millau Viaduct, France, completed in 2004
- Tietê River Project, Brazil, completed in 2015
- Skip Spann Connector Bridge, Georgia, completed in 2016
- Tunnel section of A2 motorway, Netherlands, completed in 2019
- Ten stations on the Doha Metro Gold Line, completed in 2019
- Long Beach International Gateway, California, completed in 2020
- Port of Calais Breakwater, France, completed in 2020
- Six stations on the Sydney Metro City & Southwest, Australia, due to be completed in 2024
- Rail systems for Old Oak Common railway station, due to be completed in 2032

== Publications ==
- The Arcadis Sustainable Cities Index 2022
- 2022 Global Construction Disputes Report
- International Construction Costs 2022
