= Worshipful Company of Paviors =

Livery company of the City of London

Paviors' Company
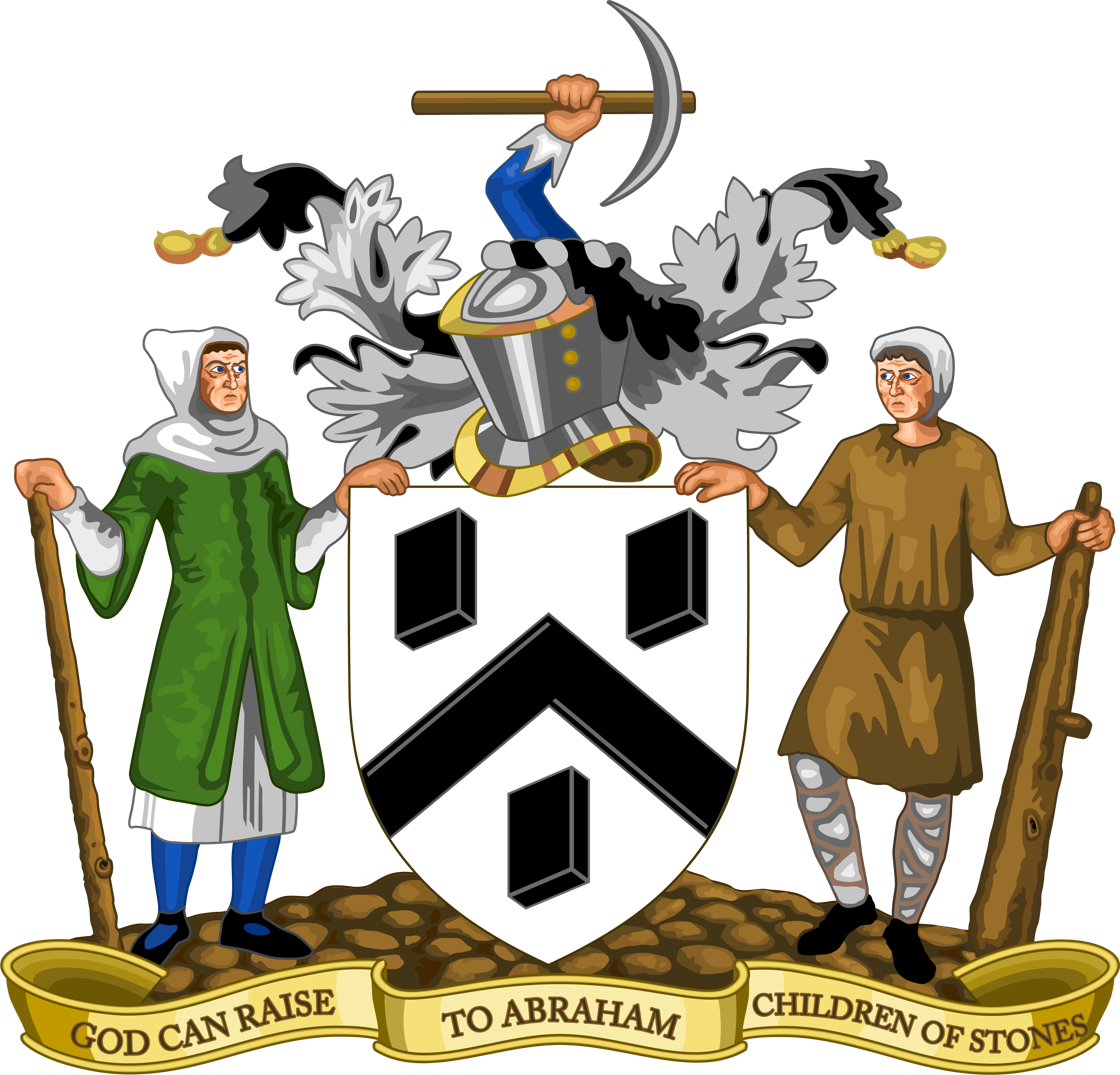
- Coat of Arms of the Worshipful Company of Paviors, granted in 1929
- Motto: God can raise to Abraham children of stones
- Location: Charterhouse, Charterhouse Square, City of London
- Date of formation: Prior to 1276
- Company association: Road Building (Construction)
- Order of precedence: 56th
- Master of company: Alexander Malmaeus
- Website: www.paviors.org.uk

The Worshipful Company of Paviors is one of the livery companies of the City of London. The Paviors can trace their history back to medieval times; they were responsible for the paving and maintenance of London's streets. It received a Royal Charter from Queen Elizabeth II in 2004. The company is no longer a trade association for or a regulator of London's road constructors. Today, it focuses on the promotion of excellence in all areas of construction.

The Paviors' Company ranks fifty-sixth in the order of precedence for livery companies.

== Early history ==
From medieval times a small part of the City of London was paved, financed by a tax called pavage. In 1316, six Paviors were appointed by the City of London from which they gradually developed into a fellowship. In 1479, the Paviors received a code of ordinances from the City of London Corporation giving them authority for the first time over the “craft of paving”. The Paviors remained a modest company without a hall of its own or livery and its funds were held by a warden. Membership was small, around 20 at the end of the sixteenth century, and its meetings were held in various taverns. One peculiarity was that some Paviors were members of the Goldsmiths Company and there were instances of disputes being referred to the Court of Aldermen. Figures given in 1672 showed the paviors having 56 members and 35 Goldsmiths who were also on the books of the Paviors. One enlightened practice recorded in the sixteenth century was that widows were allowed to carry on the business of their late husbands and become full members of the company.

In 1673 the Paviors were granted a royal charter by King Charles II but it was rejected by the Court of Aldermen, and rejected again in 1679. Records indicated increased evidence of the Paviors exercising control over non-members, but this control eventually faded. A report in 1833 said that the compulsion to belong to the company had long gone, and payments and fines had declined. From the beginning of the Victorian era, “the decadence of the Company gradually developed” and “For over forty years a period of apathy prevailed”. No meeting of the company was held, and no new members were admitted. Eventually, a special meeting was held in 1889 to revive the company. This started with the award of prizes for essays on paving. The company applied for a livery, which was initially rejected by the Court of Aldermen but was finally granted in 1900.

== Charities and education ==
The Worshipful Company of Paviors supports the following charities:

- Arkwright Scholarships Trust
- London Construction Academy
- Construction Youth Trust
- Paviors Hall of Road Making at the Amberley Museum & Heritage Centre
- Ironbridge Gorge Museum
- Lord Mayor's Appeal Charity
- Mansion House Scholarship Scheme
- Sherriffs' and Recorder's Fund
- Guildhall School Trust

The company also makes regular donations to St Paul's Cathedral for the United Guilds Service and to St Martin-within-Ludgate Church, where the Paviors Company's new Masters' installation ceremony takes place.

The funds come from the Paviors Company Livery Trust for Charities (Registered Charity No. 1102885) and from fund-raising events.

== Affiliations ==
The paviors are affiliated with various groups and organizations.

- Frigate HMS Argyll
- Third Battalion Princess of Wales's Royal Regiment
- 29(R) Squadron of the RAF
- Amberley Museum & Heritage Centre
- Paviors Lodge Number 5646
