= West Lavington, West Sussex =

Village and parish in West Sussex, England

Coordinates: 50.97704°N 0.72965°W

West Lavington
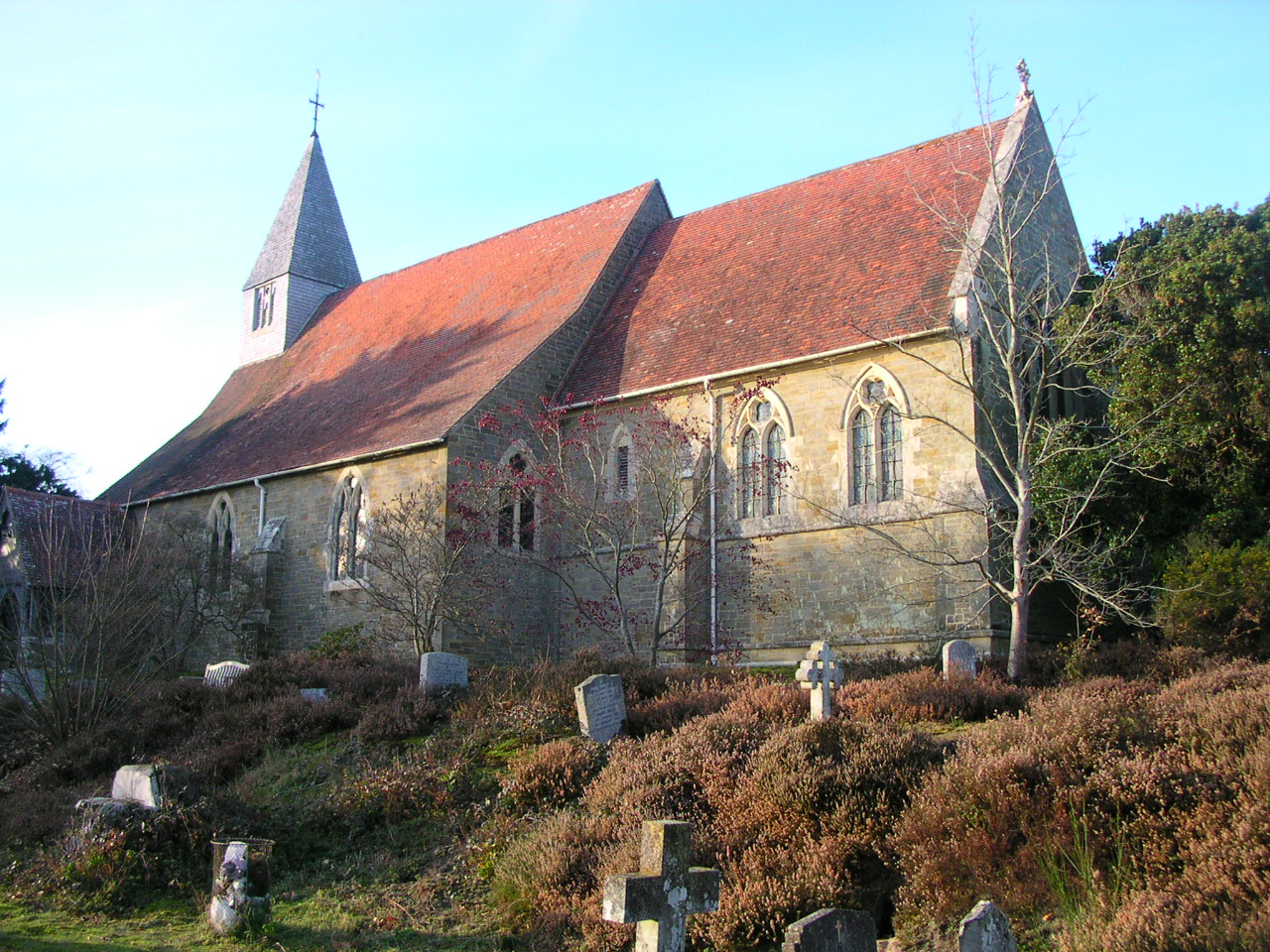
- Church of St. Mary Magdalene

- Location within West Sussex
- Area: 2.45 km^{2} (0.95 sq mi)
- Population: 276. 2011 Census
  - Density: 121/km^{2} (310/sq mi)
- OS grid reference: SU892205
  - London: 45 miles (72 km) NE
- Civil parish: West Lavington
- District: Chichester
- Shire county: West Sussex
- Region: South East
- Country: England
- Sovereign state: United Kingdom
- Post town: MIDHURST
- Postcode district: GU29
- Dialling code: 01730
- Police: Sussex
- Fire: West Sussex
- Ambulance: South East Coast
- UK Parliament: Arundel and South Downs

West Lavington is a village and civil parish on the edge of Midhurst in the Chichester district of West Sussex, England. It contains a small private nursery school and the (now deconsecrated) church of St Mary Magdalene.

== Church ==
The church was constructed for Henry Edward Manning who was at the time rector of Woolavington, now East Lavington, with West Lavington forming a detached portion of that parish until 1851. The churchyard contains the grave of Richard Cobden although he lived in the neighbouring parish of Heyshott.

As a result of falling congregations and the church's poor condition, St Mary Magdalene church (a Grade II* listed building) was closed in September 2008 and the congregation transferred to neighbouring Cocking. The two parishes were subsequently united and are now known as "The Parish of Cocking with West Lavington". In 2013, the church at West Lavington was offered for sale, although the graveyard will continue to belong to the parish with public access.

== Listed buildings ==
As well as the church, there are 14 other listed structures in the parish, including several associated with Cobden and a bridge over the former Rother Navigation at The Wharf in Midhurst.

== Demographics ==
In the 2001 census there were 111 households with a total population of 298 of whom 115 were economically active. At the 2011 Census the population of the civil parish was 276.
