= Cocking Lime Works =

Historical industrial site in England

Midhurst Brick & Lime Co. Ltd.
- Trade name: Cocking Lime Works
- Traded as: Midhurst Whites
- Industry: Chalk quarrying and lime production
- Defunct: 1999
- Headquarters: Cocking, West Sussex, England; 50.94695°N 0.75230°W
- Key people: Benjamin Cloke

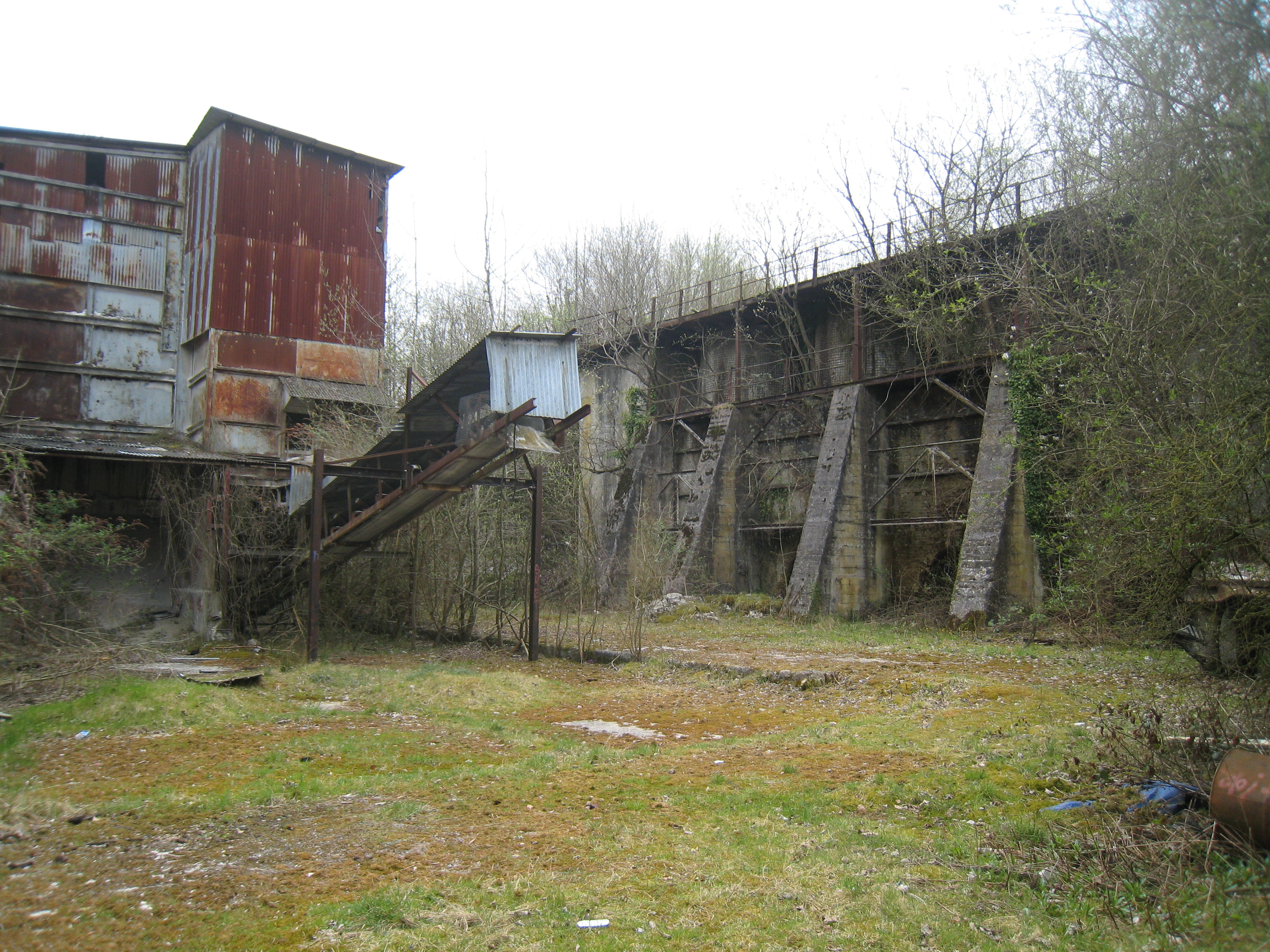
The lime works, showing the south battery of lime kilns (right) and the screening plant (left).

Cocking Lime Works and its associated chalk quarry are abandoned industrial sites in the South Downs of England. They are to the south of the village of Cocking, West Sussex, close to the South Downs Way. The works are on land owned by the Cowdray Estate and are not open to the public. Cocking was the source of lime used for the manufacture of Midhurst White bricks and for agricultural purposes.

== Location ==
The lime kilns are beside the A286 about 0.5 km (0.3 mi) south of the village of Cocking. They are in a small chalk pit, now heavily overgrown, at grid reference SU87751715 and occupy a site of approximately 3 ha (7 acres). This area is known as "The Butts", having been used for archery practice in the 12th century.

The chalk quarry is about 500 m (1,640 ft) south-east at grid reference SU88251677 just to the south of Sun Combe, at an elevation about 80 m (260 ft) above the site of the kilns, and cover an area of approximately 6 ha (15 acres). The two sites are linked by an embanked roadway, built in 1962 to allow lorries to transport chalk direct from the quarry to the kilns.

== History ==
=== General ===
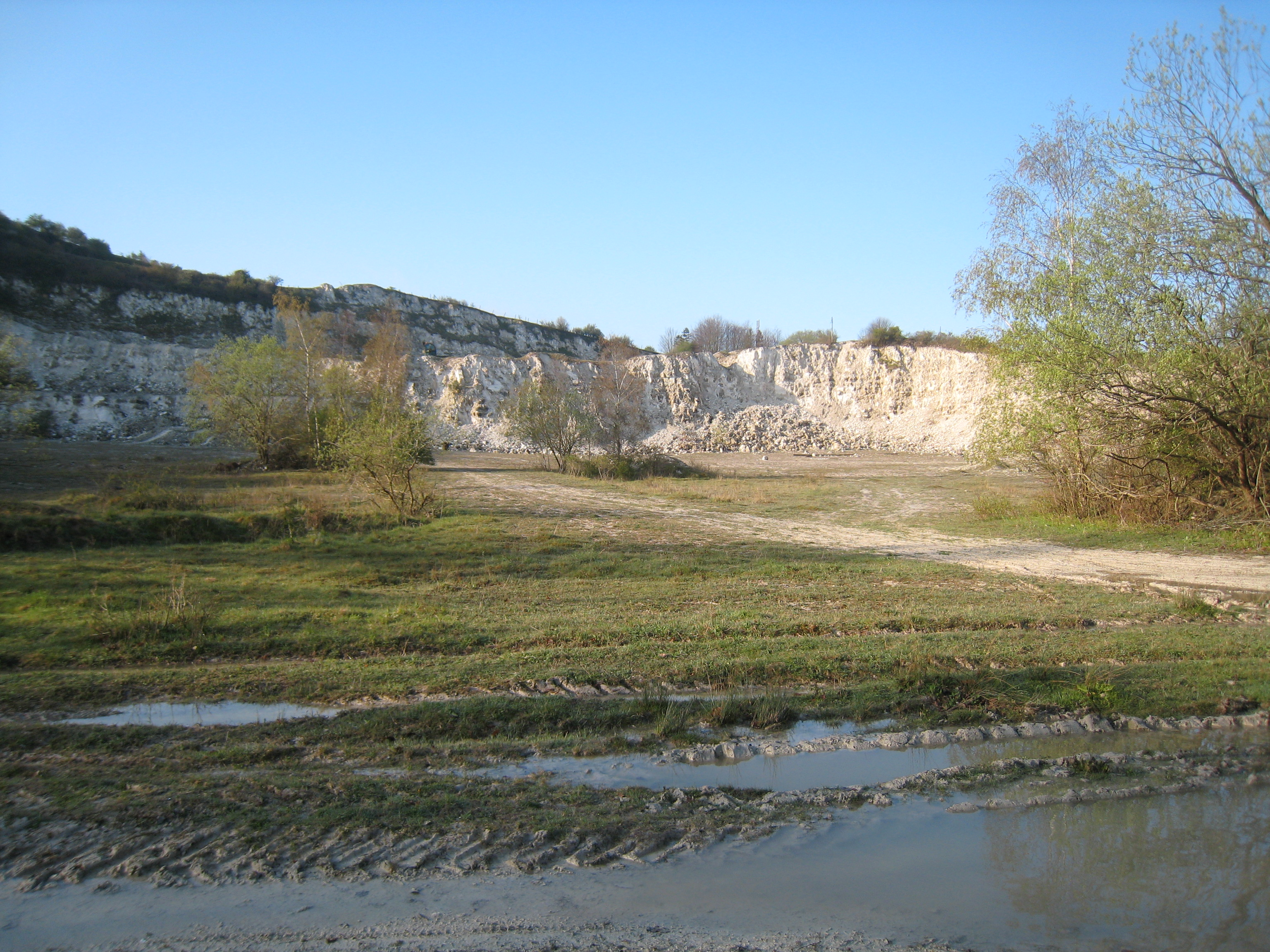
Cocking chalk pit

The earliest known mention of lime workings in the parish of Cocking is in 1715, when Cowdray Estate documents refer to two isolated lime kilns being in use.

A map of the Cowdray Estate from 1768 shows a chalk pit on Cocking Hill, while the tithe map of 1842 shows the chalk pit as being assigned to Rev. Thomas Valentine, the incumbent at Cocking Church. In 1830, the estate map showed further lime kilns at Wolverstone Farm, at the southern edge of the parish.

In September 1833, William Marshall was killed by an earthquake in a chalk pit at Cocking.

The 1861 Census includes the entry "James Bennett, a tramp, slept in lime kiln" under Cocking, although there is no indication of the precise location. The same census describes Henry Farley, of Wolverstone Farm as a "Limeburner and timber merchant". The 1874 Ordnance Survey 25" scale map shows three lime kilns in the parish: one was near the head of Sun Combe and has been lost in later quarry excavations, while the others were in the lower pit closer to the village, one on the site of the later kilns and the other a few yards higher, now covered by trees. These kilns were probably small wood-fired flare kilns producing grey hydraulic lime.

The chalk pits and lime kilns were leased by the Cowdray Estate to various people over the years. In 1906, a lease was granted to Pepper and Sons from Amberley in respect of two lime kilns, "one in good working order". In 1921, the site was leased to Frederick Searle; this lease was later assigned to his brother, Eli. In 1924, Eli entered into partnership with Robert Dunning, who agreed to "build new flare kilns on the site of old wood flare kilns". The following year, Dunning acquired the Midhurst Brickworks which had been producing bricks made from sand and lime since 1913 from a site close to the former Midhurst (LSWR) railway station. In 1926, Benjamin Cloke became the owner of the Midhurst Brick & Lime Company, thus also acquiring the works at Cocking.

In 1993, the site was acquired by the Dudman Group of Companies who owned it until 1999, when all work ceased at both sites, since when the works have been abandoned.

=== Operational ===
The earliest chalk pits were dug by hand with the lime kilns close by. As the chalk pits became deeper, workmen would be suspended with ropes from the top of the cliff, breaking the chalk by hand. It was not until the 1940s that explosives were used to break the chalk out of the quarry face. Blasting took place two or three times per week, often on Sunday mornings and provoked regular complaints from the residents of Cocking village, particularly regarding cracked ceilings and broken windows.

The expansion of the lime works commenced in 1906 following the granting of the lease to Pepper and Sons from Amberley. By 1914, a 2 ft gauge tramway had been built between the lower chalk pit and the lime kiln at grid reference SU87751704. This was shown on the 1914 edition of the six-inch Ordnance Survey map and was still shown on later six-inch maps up to the 1970s. There remain traces of this tramway on the site, including sections of rail and the chassis of a truck. This kiln was still extant in the 1930s, although derelict.

Following the acquisition by Robert Dunning in 1924, the works were considerably expanded to provide supplies to the Midhurst Brickworks. By this time, the chalk was being extracted solely from the upper chalk pit and an overhead ropeway was constructed to speed up the transport of chalk from the chalk pit to the kilns. This ropeway ran just to the north of the later roadway with the upper "terminus" being situated at grid reference SU881169. At about this time, six new draw kilns were built, which are now the centre of the south battery.

The site continued to be developed throughout the 1920s and 1930s, including the erection of a further battery of four flare kilns to the north of the original battery. An overhead crane was installed to transfer the chalk from the end of the overhead ropeway to the kilns, and also to move coal from the store and transfer the lime into the lime grinding plant. The draw kilns in the south battery were also converted to flare kilns; this was to ensure that the lime was clean enough for use in the manufacture of the Midhurst White bricks; also, the draw kilns were more labour-intensive and used more fuel.

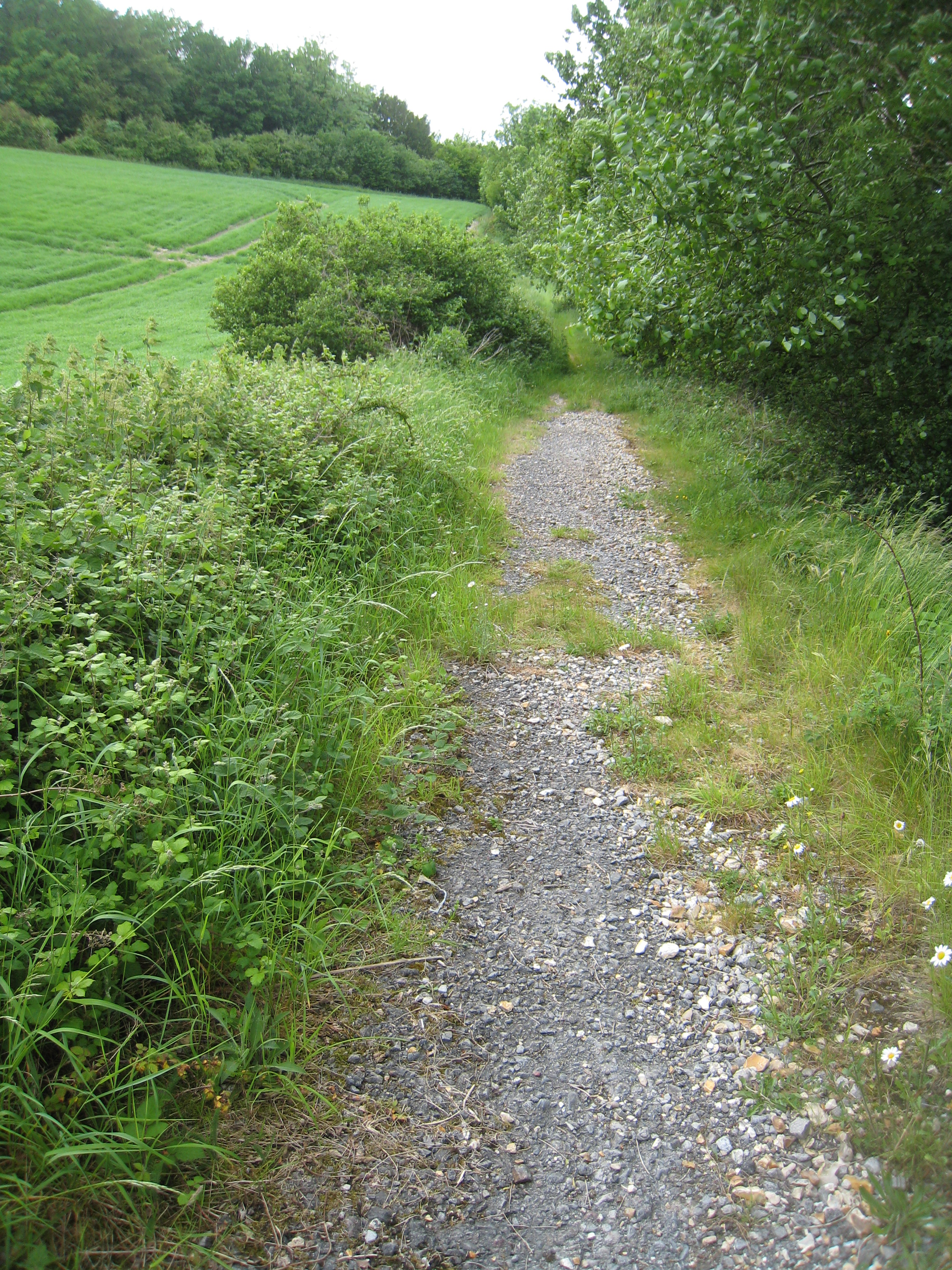
The roadway, built in 1962, which connects the chalk pit and lime kilns.

In 1938, the company were requested by the Ministry of Agriculture to produce lime for agricultural purposes, following which the intermediate chalk crushing plant was installed. The company marketed a product called "Calco", a mixture of powdered chalk and lime, and also contracted with farmers to spread this material on their fields. The large storage shed to the western end of the remaining battery of kilns was used to store the Calco.

Between 1926 and 1938, the company excavated approximately 3,200 tons of chalk annually from the chalk pit, all of which was used for brick production. From 1938 on, the amount of chalk processed increased substantially, reaching a peak of 36,000 tons in 1955 with agricultural lime accounting for all the additional output.

A seventh kiln was erected at the western end of the south battery in the 1940s, which was used to dry chalk with the eighth kiln being added at the opposite end in 1958. By the end of the 1950s, the north battery had been demolished and only the eastern end wall now remains. Following the demolition of the north battery, the overhead crane was also dismantled and the south battery was enlarged and converted to draw kilns. Following the dismantling of the crane, the kilns were loaded using a dragline excavator placed on the higher ground to the south and unloaded by a portable conveyor belt pushed into the draw holes.

In the late-1950s, the overhead ropeway was dismantled and chalk was delivered from the quarry by use of either the lane from Hill Barn or the A286 road. In 1962, a new embanked roadway was built to provide a direct connection between the chalk pit and the lime kilns.

In 1985, the production of lime for bricks ceased following the cessation of trading at the Midhurst Brick & Lime Company, after which all production was for agricultural purposes; as well as "Calco", the company also produced "Nurslim", for use on gardens and nurseries. The last building to be erected was the primary chalk crusher, which was installed in 1985.

== Buildings and structures ==
At the centre of the works is the bank of eight lime kilns. The original six kilns were draw kilns with a continuous retaining wall 6.3 m (20.7 ft) high along the front, with concrete buttresses between each kiln. The kilns extend to a further 2.9 m (9 ft 6 in) above the retaining wall. The kiln pots are about 3.0 m (9.8 ft) in diameter at the top and taper down to rectangular draw holes at the bottom which are 1.6 m (5 ft 3 in) x 0.8 m (2 ft 7 in) in dimension. The draw hole grates support raking irons in the bottom of each kiln. At the front of each kiln, there are semi-circular draw arches.

The kilns at each end are later additions. The kiln at the western (left) end is set forward and is a free standing structure identical in height to the main bank of six. It is rectangular (4.5 m (14.8 ft) x 5.0 m (16.4 ft) in dimension) with a pot 2.1 m (6 ft 11 in) in diameter at the top. This kiln has a separate furnace chamber connected to it by a flue. The eastern kiln (inscribed 1958) was the last to be built. This is similar in size to the original six although at a slight angle and was built with concrete outer walls with no buttresses.

The kilns had a charging platform which extended across all eight surmounted by a railway line.

At the south-east of the site, with its top about 16 m (50 ft) above the level of the base of the kilns, is the primary chalk crusher. This was accessible to the lorries bringing chalk down from the chalk pit. The crusher was electrically driven, and was fed from a hopper into the rotating teeth. The crusher discharged onto a conveyor belt which transferred the chalk to the intermediate chalk crusher.

The intermediate chalk crusher is about 40 m (130 ft) north, with its top about 7 m (20 ft) above the level of the base of the kilns. This comprised a sequence of crushing machines and ball mills connected by conveyor belts in a steel-framed, asbestos-clad building. The crushed chalk was then either discharged onto lorries for transport off the site, or by conveyor belt to the final screening plant.

The final screening plant was in a two-storey building attached to the west of the intermediate chalk crusher to which it is connected by two high-level conveyor belts. The upper floor housed two sets of "Niagara" vibrating screens to sort the crushed chalk. The screening plant discharged into road transport or into a storage building alongside.

== Gallery ==
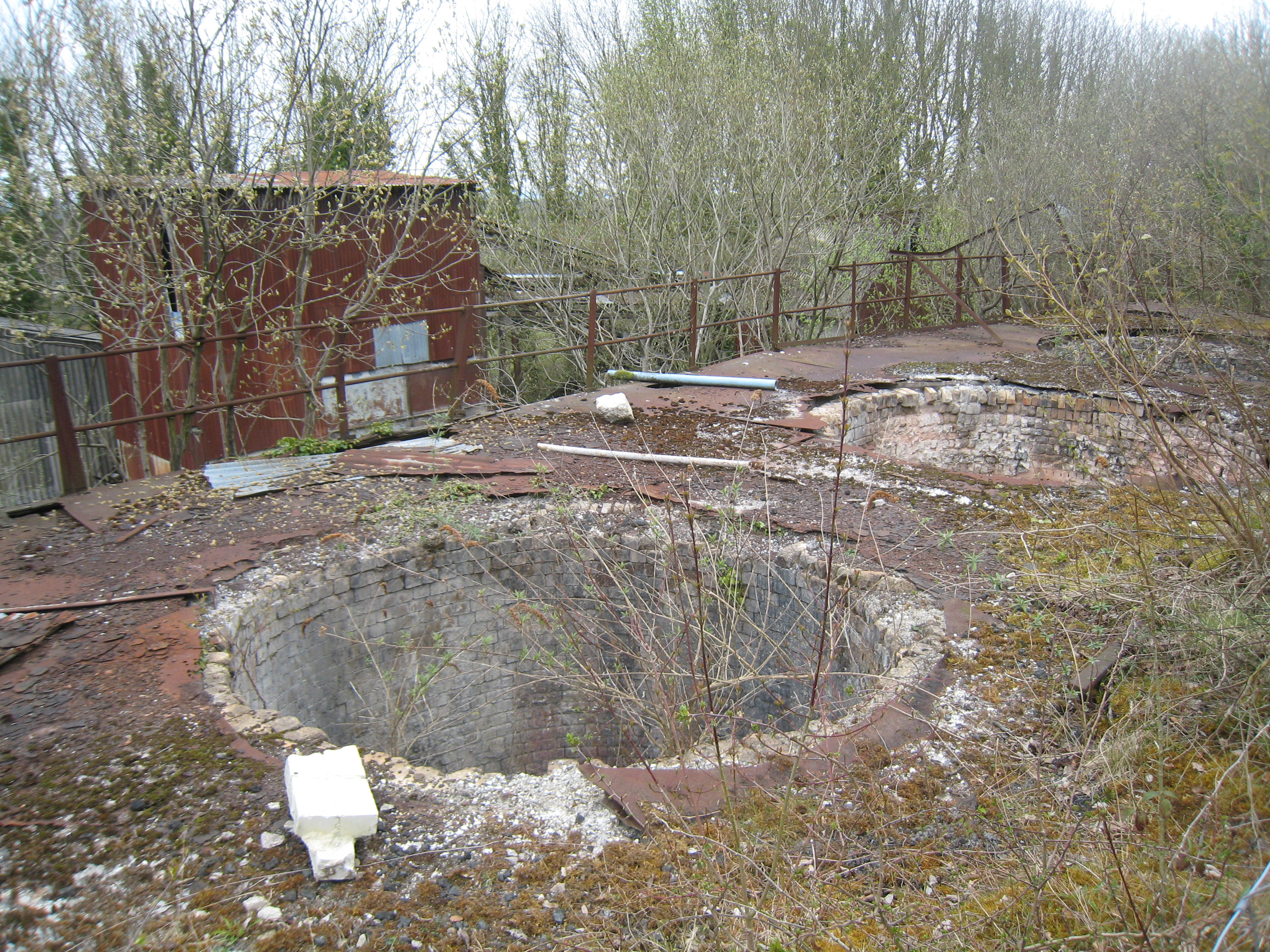
The top of the lime kilns

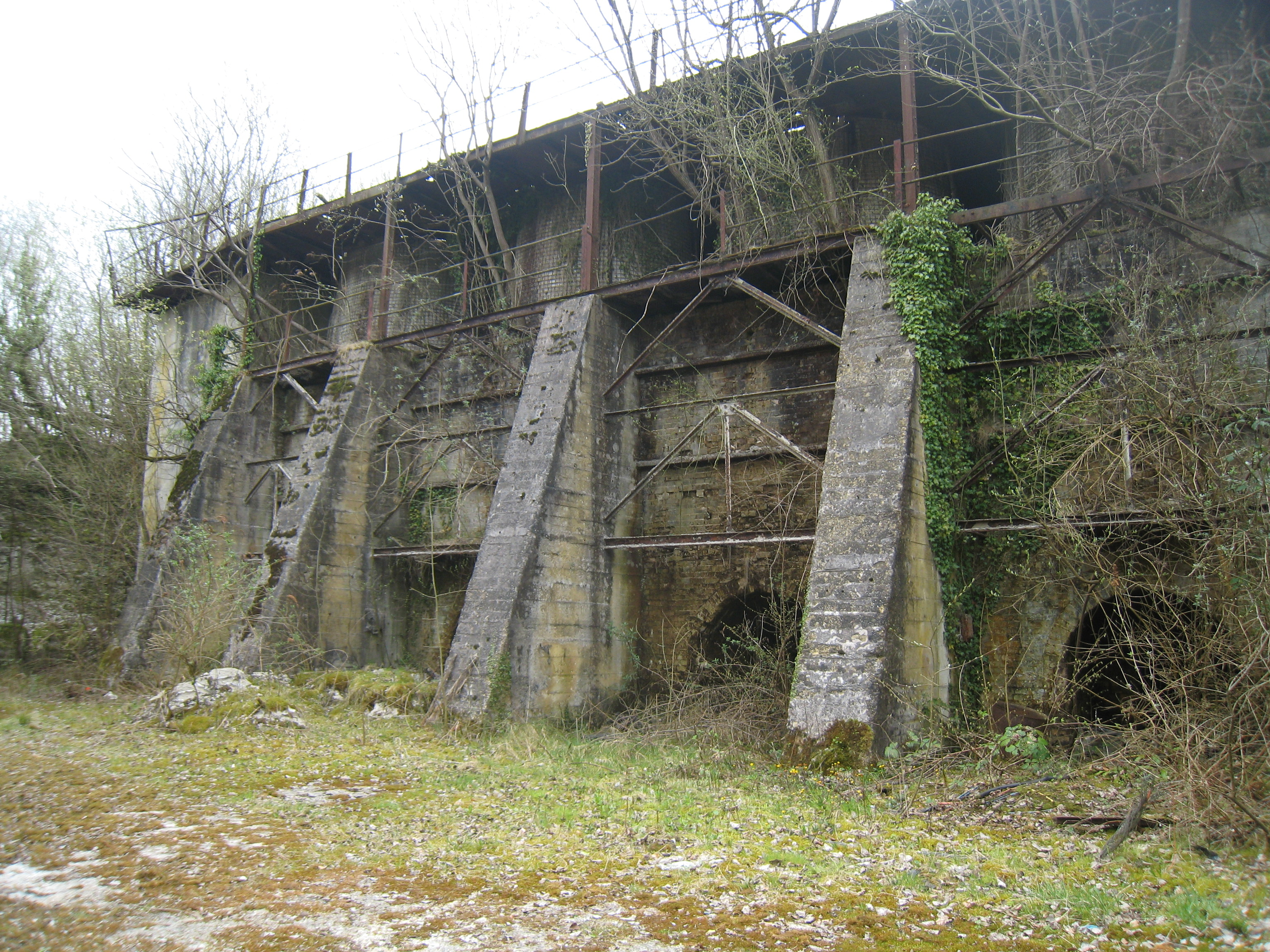
The eastern end of the bank of lime kilns

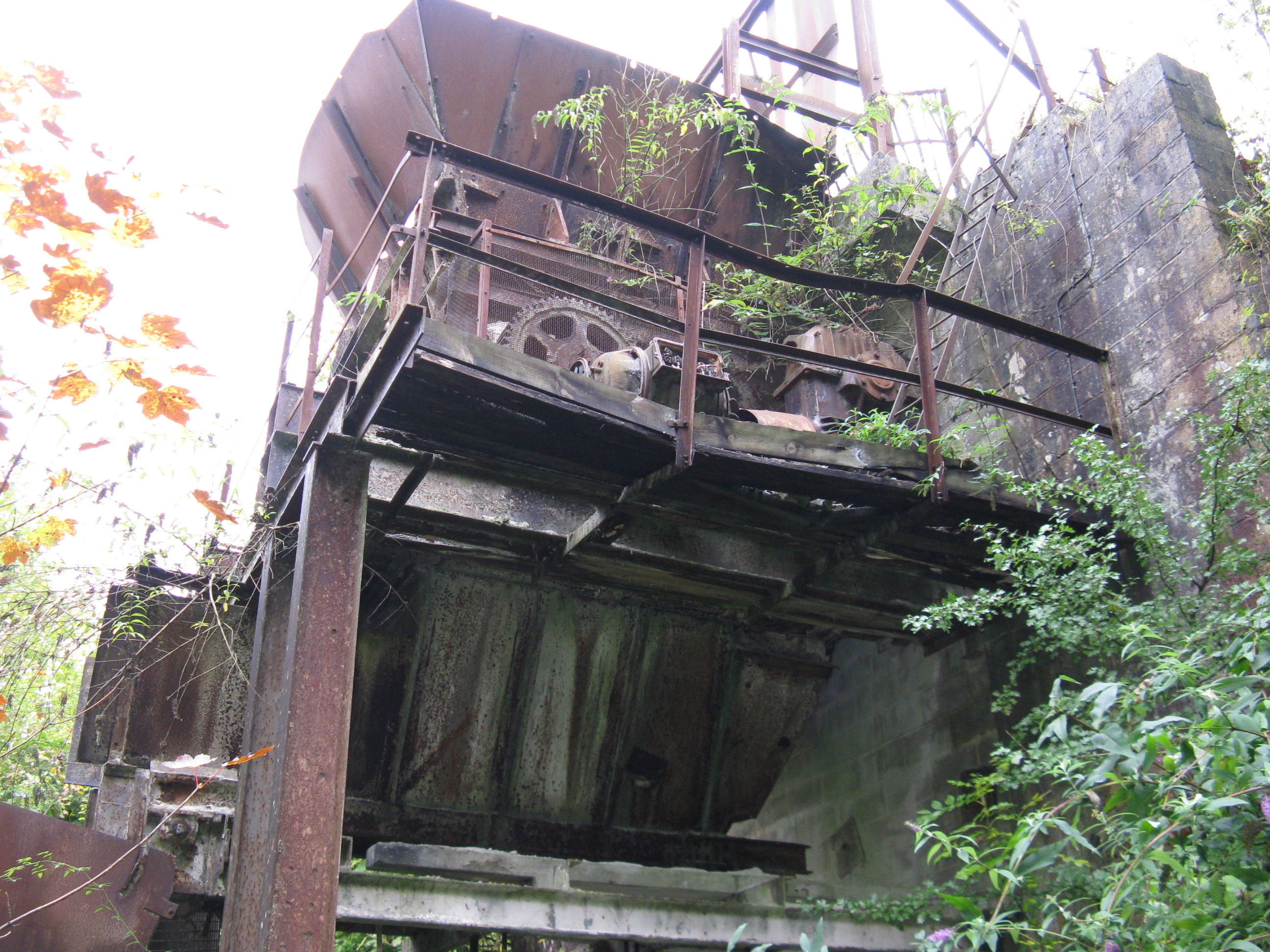
The primary chalk crusher

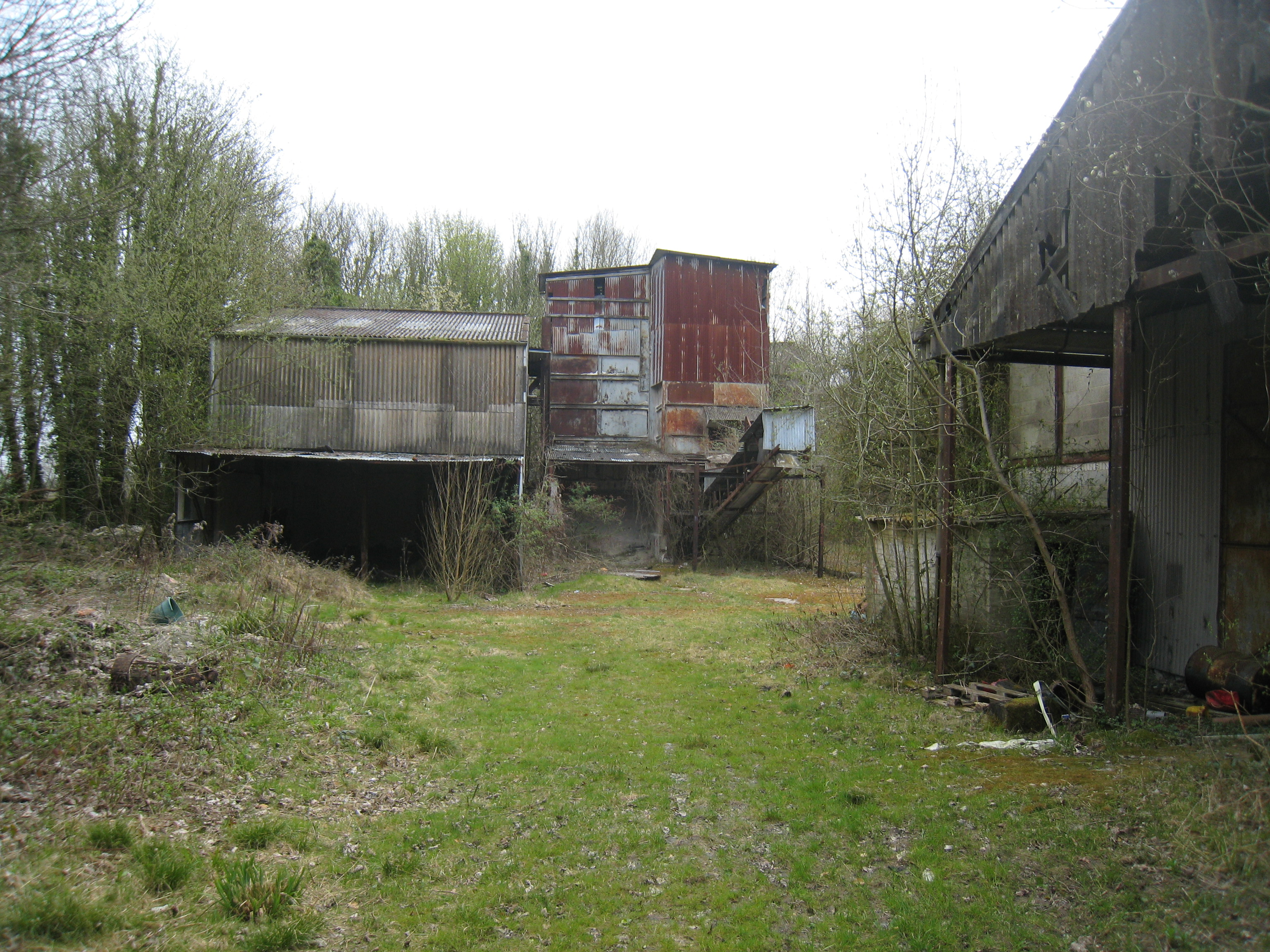
The rear of the intermediate chalk crusher and final screening plant

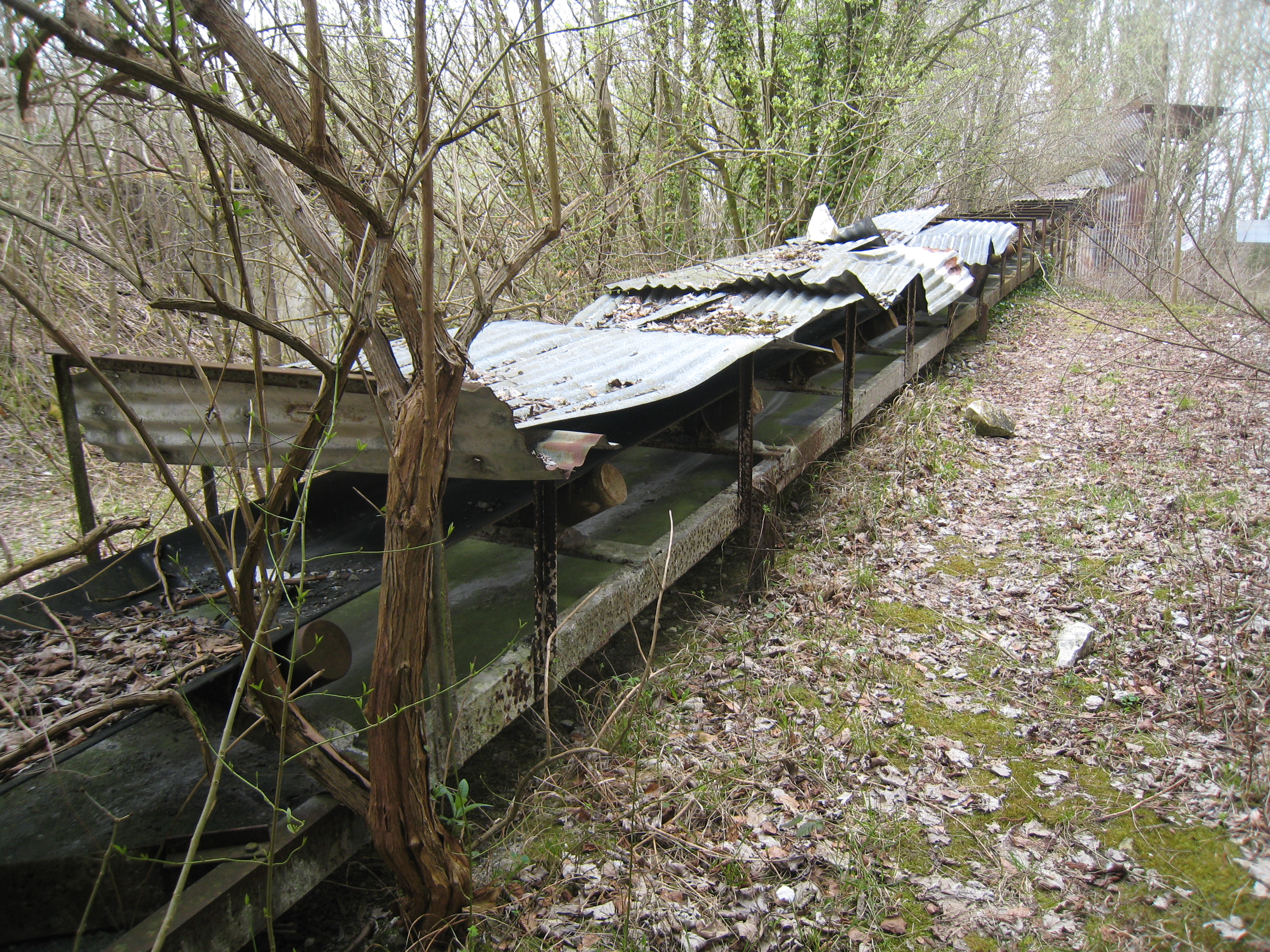
The conveyor belt which connected the primary and intermediate chalk crushers

== Present use and future plans ==
The chalk pit was abandoned in 1999, although chalk is occasionally extracted for local use. The quarry remains the property of the Cowdray Estate, who manage it as part of their pheasant shooting. The estate has 18 drives on 3,500 acres at Cocking, with the chalk pit being described as the estate's "signature drive".

In May 2011, Cowdray Estate applied for planning permission to use the chalk pit as an inert landfill site. The application was rejected by West Sussex County Council.

In 2012, Cowdray Estate published proposals to redevelop the site of the lime works "to provide overnight camping facilities for walkers and cyclists using the South Downs Way, together with a visitor facility for the industrial archaeology of the lime works". This proposal would have necessitated the demolition of all the buildings on the site other than the bank of lime kilns.

== Bibliography ==
- Cloke, George (2000). "Midhurst Whites Brickworks" (PDF). Sussex Industrial History. Sussex Industrial Archaeology Society. Archived from the original on 7 January 2016.
- Cocking History Group (2005). A Short History of Cocking. Midhurst: Studio Gallery Publications. ISBN 0-9542357-1-1.
- Martin, Ron (2003). "Cocking Lime Works" (PDF). Sussex Industrial History. Sussex Industrial Archaeology Society. Archived from the original on 4 March 2016.
