= Old Town Hall, Midhurst =

Municipal building in Midhurst, West Sussex, England

Old Town Hall
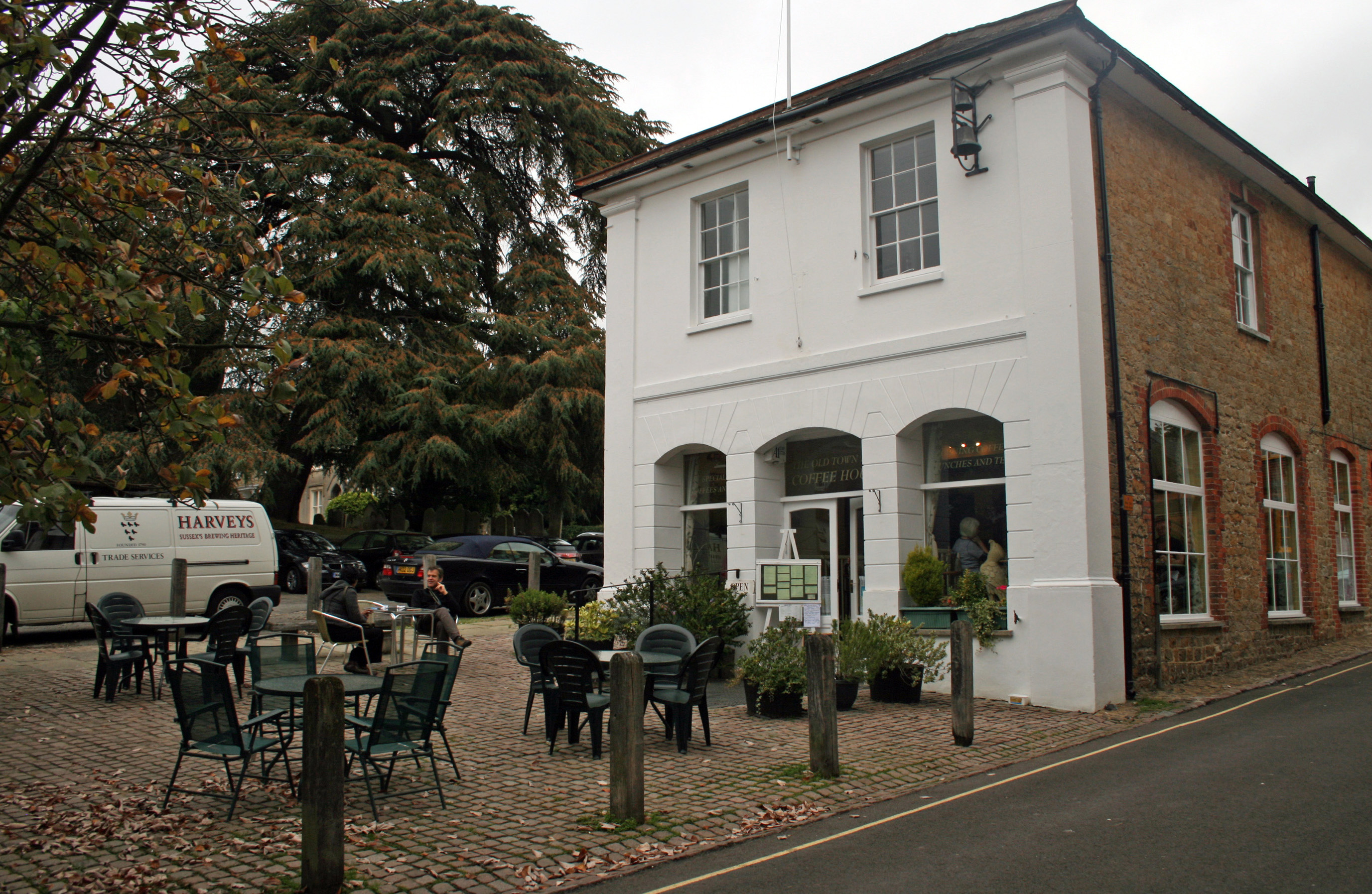
- Old Town Hall, Midhurst

- Shown in West Sussex
- 50.9856°N 0.7373°W
- Location: Market Square, Midhurst

History
- Built: 1551

Site notes
- Architectural style: Neoclassical style

Listed Building – Grade II
- Official name: Eagle House Antiques Market with the Parish Room over It
- Designated: 26 November 1987
- Reference no.: 1234718

The Old Town Hall is a municipal building in the Market Square in Midhurst, West Sussex, England. The building, which is managed by the Midhurst Town Trust, is a Grade II listed building.

== History ==
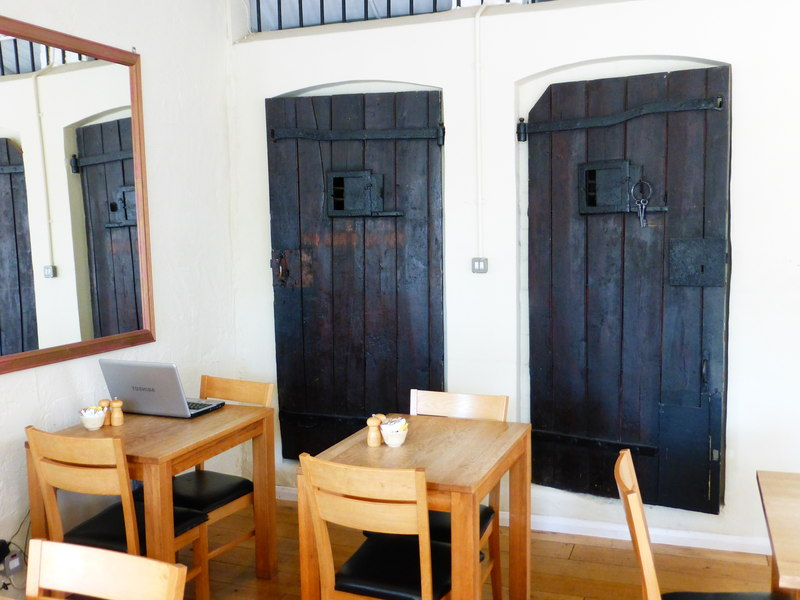
The two cells in the building

The member of parliament for Guildford, Sir Anthony Brown, donated a site in the Market Square to the burgesses of Midhurst for the purposes of erecting a market hall in 1551. The building was designed in the neoclassical style, built in buff brick with an ashlar front and was completed later that year. It was arcaded on the ground floor, so that markets could be held, with an assembly room on the first floor. The design involved a symmetrical main frontage facing west towards Church Hill; there were three openings on the ground floor, which was rusticated, and there were two sash windows on the first floor. Full-height Doric order pilasters were installed at the corners and the roof was hipped and covered with slate.

A woven coverlet maker, Gilbert Hannan, founded a grammar school for twelve poor boys in the assembly room in 1672, and the building was converted for municipal use as the local town hall in 1760. The assembly room was originally accessed using a stone staircase inside the building but, in the early 1840s, extensive restoration work was carried out at the expense of the local member of parliament, John Abel Smith. A new external staircase with wrought iron railings was installed on the north side of the building and a lock-up with two cells for petty criminals was established in the building. Following completion of the works, magistrates' court hearings, which had been held in the Angel Inn in North Street, were relocated to the assembly room in the town hall in April 1848. The village stocks, placed outside the front of the town hall, continued to be used until January 1859, when a labourer who had defaulted on his debts, Henry Elldridge, became the last person to be sentenced to this form of punishment in the town.

The ground floor was converted for use as storage for the horse-drawn fire engine and a fire bell was installed on the front of the building just below the eaves in 1865. The borough council, which had not met for many years, was abolished under the Municipal Corporations Act 1883.

After extensive investigations to confirm the existing ownership of the property, the building was conveyed to a new charitable body, the Midhurst Town Trust, in February 1910. The fire service continued to occupy the ground floor until 1955, when the service relocated to a new fire station at The Wharf. The ground floor was then converted for use as an antiques centre, the Eagle House Antiques Market, in the 1960s, and, following a major refurbishment in 2010, the ground floor re-opened again as Garton's Coffee Shop.
