= Midhurst Brickworks =

Historical industrial site in England

Midhurst Brick & Lime Co. Ltd.
- Trade name: Midhurst Brickworks
- Traded as: Midhurst Whites
- Industry: Brick manufacture
- Founded: 1913
- Defunct: 1985
- Headquarters: Midhurst, England; 50.9832°N 0.7520°W
- Key people: Lord Cowdray; Benjamin Cloke

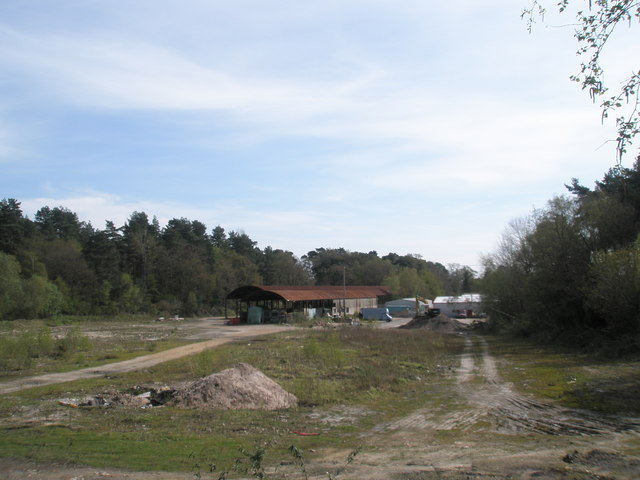
The site of Midhurst Brickworks, looking towards the former station site.

Midhurst Brickworks is a former brickworks situated to the south-west of Midhurst, West Sussex in England. The works were sited close to the (now closed) Midhurst Common railway station on the Midhurst to Petersfield (L.S.W.R.) railway line. The works were established in 1913, on land owned by the Cowdray Estate, and closed in 1985. From 1938, the company traded as Midhurst Whites after their main product, white bricks made of sand and lime, which was obtained from the Cocking Lime Works, 5 km (3 mi) south.

== History ==
The works were established in 1913 by S. Pearson & Son, a firm controlled by the Cowdray family, on land owned by Lord Cowdray. S. Pearson & Son traded as public works engineers and had been involved in the construction of Dover Docks, the Blackwall Tunnel, the East River Tunnels in New York and Vera Cruz Docks in Mexico.

Initially, sand for the bricks was extracted from a sand pit close to the works on Midhurst Common. Following the First World War, the brickworks were closed until, in 1925, the works were sold to Robert Dunning and Eli Searle, who had acquired the Cocking Lime Works the previous year. Dunning was a brick-maker from Wales, who upgraded the plant at Midhurst and Cocking, enabling the lime works to produce a fine ground lime for use in brick-making.

In 1926, the brickworks and lime works, now trading as the Midhurst Brick & Lime Co. Ltd., were acquired by Benjamin Cloke for £6,000. Cloke embarked on a major expansion programme, both at Cocking and Midhurst. At the brickworks, a 25.9 m (85 ft) high chimney was erected and £30,000 was spent on new plant, including an excavator and locomotive, two Sutcliffe Duplex brick presses, two new 160 psi autoclaves and a Lancashire boiler. Cloke had hoped to acquire a contract to supply bricks to London County Council but the contract failed to mature and eventually Cloke was forced to sell off a stock of 4 million bricks made especially for the expected London contract to a local builder for £1 per 1000; these were used in the construction of new homes at Park Crescent in Midhurst.

The company now concentrated on the manufacture of sand-lime bricks, in which damp sand and slaked lime (8% of the content) were mixed before being poured into moulds and heated under pressure in an autoclave. The autoclaves were about 2.5 m (8 ft 2 in) in diameter and 12 m (39 ft) long with a railway track built in to enable the bricks to be inserted into the autoclave on a bogie wagon. The fine-ground lime came from the lime works at Cocking.

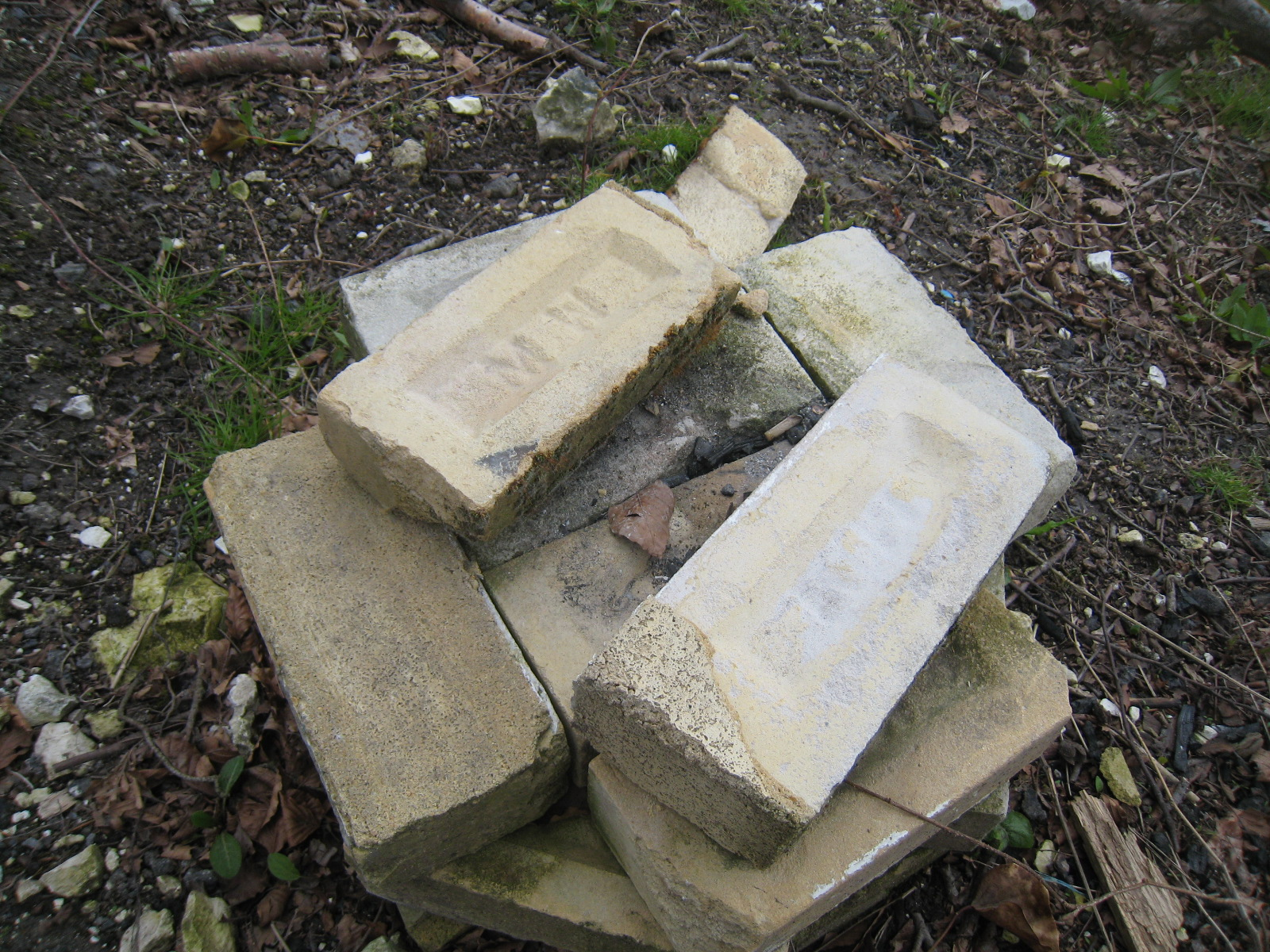
A stack of Midhurst White bricks at the former Cocking chalk pit.

In 1935, Cloke introduced the Midhurst White facing brick, as a cheap substitute for glazed brick especially for internal areas. He embarked on an extensive advertising programme, spending £3,000, offering the new white bricks at £5 per thousand against £30 for the traditional glazed bricks. The advertisement claimed that

"the texture resists the chemical erosion of atmospheric acids and gives no hold for smoky deposits. Midhurst Whites remain fresh and beautiful—giving back the sunlight year after year."

The company was soon highly profitable, generating a weekly profit in excess of £1,000 and the company was renamed as Midhurst Whites in 1938. At the same time, Benjamin Cloke decided on a flotation of the company's shares. This was not a success, but fortunately Cloke had retained a substantial holding of the company's shares, thus preventing the flotation from being a failure. Shortly after this, Cloke died from thrombosis.

To handle the expanded production, new storage sheds were erected close to the railway station, with Southern Railway providing 150 special truck containers to transport the bricks without further handling.

Production continued throughout World War II, with the company acquiring War Office contracts, including Thorney Island RAF Station. By 1945, the company had a stockpile of 8 million bricks. Following the closure of the railway in 1964, transport switched to the road. At the same time, the company expanded the works, crossing over the former railbed to open a new sand pit.

The works was closed in 1985.

== Manufacturing process ==
The sand for the bricks was extracted from pits on Midhurst Common, close to the brickworks. The sand was extracted by a Ruston steam navvy and loaded into small wagons to be towed by engine to the manufacturing plant. There the sand would be screened before being conveyed into one of two Polysius mixing drums, to be mixed with chalk, which had been delivered from Cocking in 1 cwt sacks, and water. The mixing process lasted about 30 minutes after which the slaked mixture would be transferred through an edge runner mill to the brick presses. There were two Sutcliffe duplex presses which exerted 100 ton pressure on each pair of moulds producing 2800 bricks per hour, and a German-made Bernhardi press, with eight single moulds which produced 1200 bricks per hour.

The moulded bricks were then loaded onto bogies for transfer to the autoclaves. Each of the six autoclaves could contain 13 bogies. Steam was then applied from the Lancashire boiler which provided saturated steam up to 160 lbs. per sq. inch. This process lasted 12 hours, following which the finished bricks would be taken on the works railway system either to storage sheds or to the railway goods depot.

== Works railway ==
The works had a network of three railway lines, built to a gauge of 2 ft 6 in (762 mm). The system operated on three levels: the lower level, connecting the kilns to the storage sheds and railway station; the middle level, to the sand pits; and the upper level, which took waste back from the kiln to the disused pits.

The lower level had a complex arrangement of tracks connecting the kilns to the two storage sheds and also to the goods shed at the LSWR station. In 1964, two locomotives worked on this level. The most heavily used locomotive was a Hudson "Go-Go" petrol/paraffin locomotive built in 1932, works No.HT45913. The outside frames of this locomotive covered the wheels and reached almost to the ground. This engine is now on display at the Amberley Museum Railway. The second locomotive on this level was a 4-wheel Simplex petrol locomotive, works number 6023.

The middle level served the active sand pits, transporting material to the kilns. This level was operated by another 4-wheel Simplex petrol locomotive, works number 8981, now at the Old Kiln Light Railway. The upper level carried waste back from the kiln to reclaim disused pits. A third Simplex petrol locomotive, works number 6035, operated this level. This locomotive is now at the Apedale Valley Light Railway in Staffordshire.

== The Midhurst White brick ==
The Midhurst White brick suffered from excessive weathering especially in coastal areas, and as a result houses built with them needed to be rendered. The bricks did, however, have a much greater compressive strength than ordinary "red" bricks and could bear heavy loads without fracture. In 2012, the Midhurst Conservation Area draft plan described the bricks as "not attractive", preferring traditional red bricks.

The bricks were used in the light wells of Battersea Power Station, and at Broadcasting House and the headquarters of the Royal Institute of British Architects.

== Bibliography ==
- Cloke, George (2000). "Midhurst Whites Brickworks" (PDF). Sussex Industrial History. Sussex Industrial Archaeology Society. Archived from the original on 7 January 2016.
- Martin, Ron (2003). "Cocking Lime Works" (PDF). Sussex Industrial History. Sussex Industrial Archaeology Society. Archived from the original on 4 March 2016.
