= St Margaret's Convent, Midhurst =

St Margaret's Convent

Location
- Petersfield Road; Midhurst, West Sussex, GU29 9JN; England; 50°59′10″N 0°44′26″W

Information
- Type: Private school
- Religious affiliation: Roman Catholic
- Established: 1888
- Founders: Sisters of Mercy
- Closed: 2009
- Gender: Girls

St Margaret's Convent was a mixed primary and an all-girls secondary convent school in Midhurst, West Sussex.

St Margaret's was founded by the Sisters of Mercy in 1888. By the 21st century pupil numbers dropped substantially as parents opted to send their children to state schools or independent schools such as Seaford College less than a 20-minute drive away. The senior section closed in 2002 and it became a junior school. It was initially proposed that Seaford's junior school and St Margaret's would merge but the plans fell through and closure was inevitable. In July 2009, hundreds of Midhurst locals and former pupils gathered at the school compound for the farewell ceremony.

The building it once occupied was designated a Grade II listed building in 2010. The Sisters continued their presence in Midhurst after the school's closure.
