= Midhurst =

Market town in West Sussex, England

Coordinates: 50.985°N 0.740°W

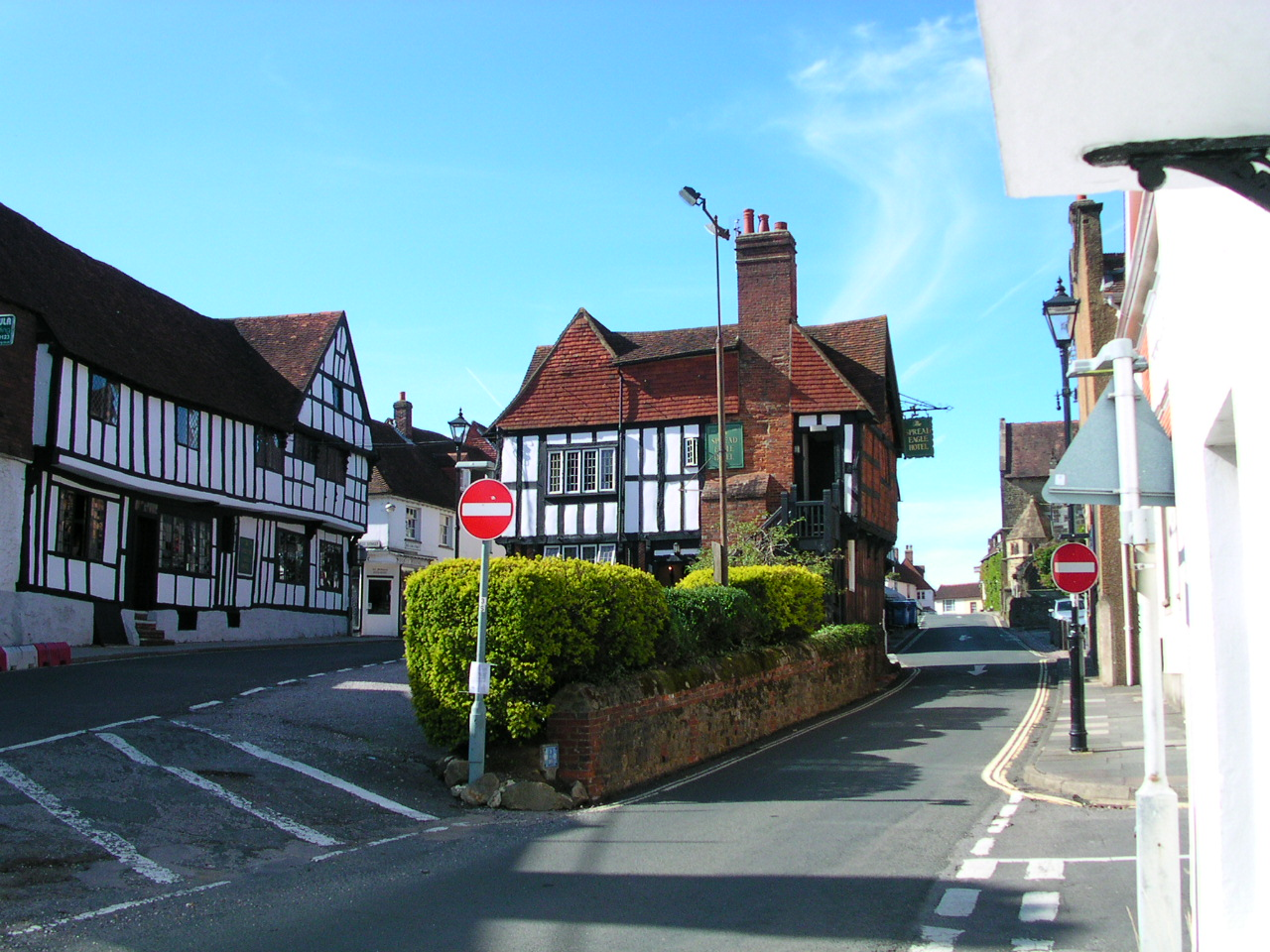
- Midhurst from the south

- Location within West Sussex
- Area: 3.33 km^{2} (1.29 sq mi)
- Population: 4,914 (2011)
  - Density: 1,467/km^{2} (3,800/sq mi)
- OS grid reference: SU885214
  - London: 45 miles (72 km) NE
- Civil parish: Midhurst
- District: Chichester
- Shire county: West Sussex
- Region: South East
- Country: England
- Sovereign state: United Kingdom
- Post town: MIDHURST
- Postcode district: GU29
- Dialling code: 01730
- Police: Sussex
- Fire: West Sussex
- Ambulance: South East Coast
- UK Parliament: Arundel and South Downs
- Website: www.midhurst-tc.gov.uk

Midhurst (/ˈmɪdhɜːrst/) is a market town and civil parish in the Chichester District in West Sussex, England. It lies on the River Rother, 20 miles (30 km) inland from the English Channel and 12 miles (19 km) north of Chichester.

The name Midhurst was first recorded in 1186 as Middeherst, meaning "Middle wooded hill", or "(place) among the wooded hills". It derives from the Old English words midd (adjective) or mid (preposition), meaning "in the middle", plus hyrst, "a wooded hill".

The Norman St. Ann's Castle dates from about 1120, although the foundations are all that can now be seen. The castle, the parish church of St. Mary Magdalene and St. Denis, together with South Pond, the former fish-pond for the castle, are the only three structures left from this early period. The parish church is the oldest building in Midhurst. Just across the River Rother, in the parish of Easebourne, is the ruin of the Tudor Cowdray House.

== Governance ==
=== National ===
The former parliamentary constituency of Midhurst is now an electoral ward of the parliamentary constituency of Arundel and South Downs, and was previously part of the Parliamentary Constituency of Chichester represented in the House of Commons from 2017 to 2024 by Conservative MP Gillian Keegan. Since the 2024 general election it has been represented by Conservative MP Andrew Griffith.

=== Local ===
Midhurst is part of the Chichester District of West Sussex County, governed by the Chichester District Council and West Sussex County Council respectively. Midhurst is represented by two councillors on the Chichester District Council, both of them Liberal Democrats, Jess Brown-Fuller and Hannah Burton.

=== Parish ===
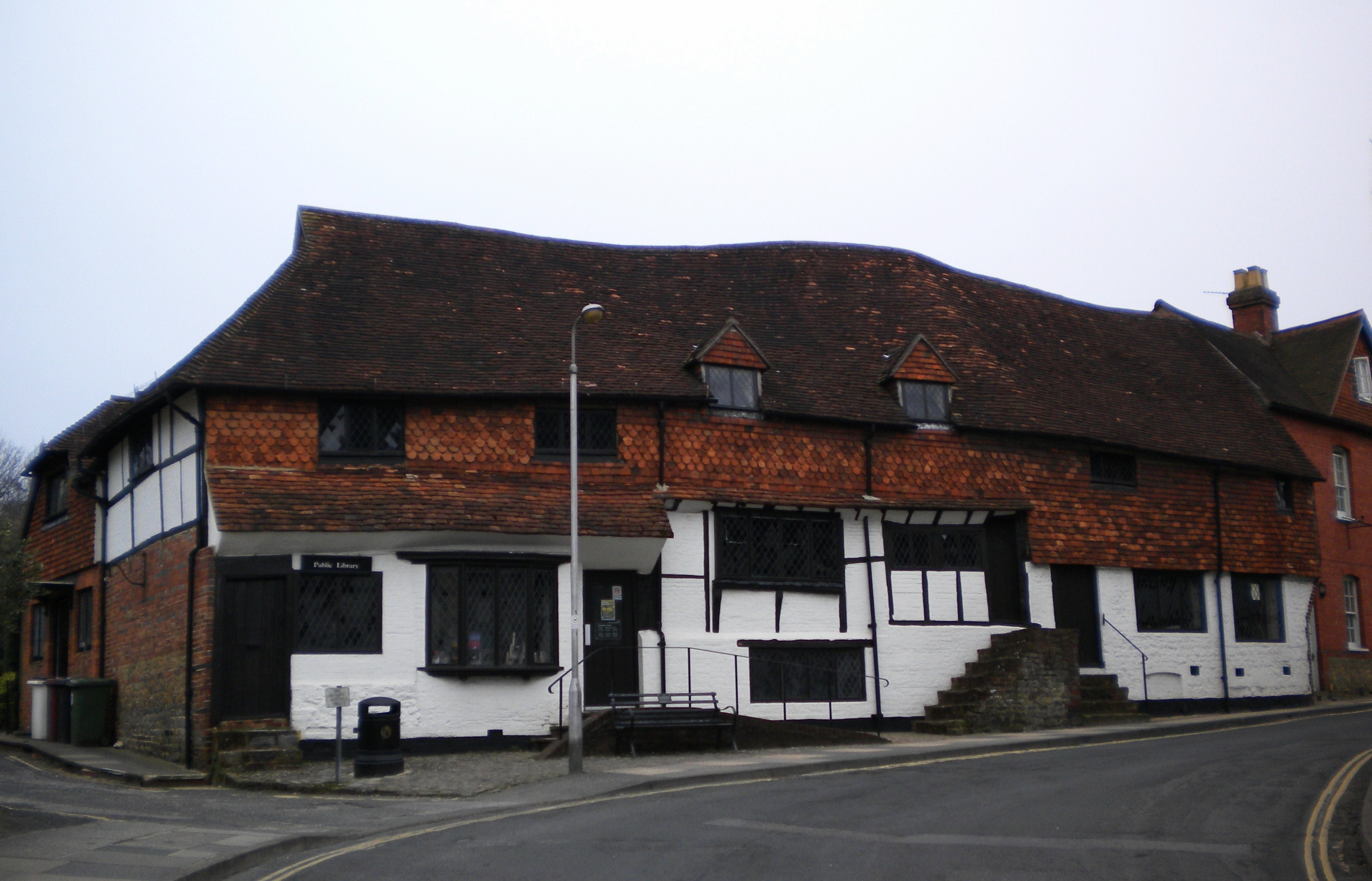
The Old Library, Midhurst, now the Town Council offices

The Midhurst Town Council meets monthly and comprises 15 directly elected members. The May 2015 election was uncontested as there were 13 nominations for the 15 seats, and therefore 2 vacancies. Four of these were women (31%). Various changes have occurred since the election. The council is led by a chairperson nominated by the councillors from among themselves. The council is supported by a staff of two: the Town Clerk (and Responsible Finance Officer) and an Assistant Town Clerk. There are three Council Committees: Finance, Asset and Policy (meets monthly), Community and Environment (meets monthly) and Planning and Infrastructure, which has an advisory function only to the principal planning authorities (Chichester District Council and the South Downs National Park Authority) (meets fortnightly). The times and dates of meetings, the minutes of meetings and other information is available on the Town Council website.

The Midhurst Town Council organises a community street party every December on the first Friday of December, a Summer Street Party on the last Saturday of August, various events for families throughout the year and regular 'Big Cleans'. The council is responsible for the town recreation ground and the town cemetery, and provides grants to various local clubs and organisations.

In 2014 the Town Council moved from its former offices in Capron House on North Street to the Old Library building on Knockhundred Row. The building is leased from the West Sussex County Council, with a view to its eventual purchase by the Town Council.

== Economy ==
Midhurst is a market town servicing its rural hinterland through many small businesses, shops, restaurants and cafes. Its primary economic activities, in terms of employment, are wholesale and retail businesses including motor mechanics, construction, hotels, food and drink and office administration. In 2011 it had a population of 4,914, comprising 2,434 households (average size 2 people) and 3,477 economically active residents. Of the 1,027 economically inactive residents, 673 (65.5 per cent) were retirees.

Between 1913 and 1985, the Midhurst Brickworks, famous for producing "Midhurst White" bricks, was situated close to the former Midhurst Common railway station.

There is an area of light industry in the south of Midhurst, between the Holmbush Estate and Little Midhurst.

== Culture and community ==
=== Culture ===
The Midhurst Music, Arts and Drama Festival (MADhurst) is an annual community event that brings together the creative, artistic & musical talent of Midhurst. It takes place at multiple venues in and around Midhurst for ten days every summer, culminating on August Bank Holiday in a Carnival Parade (organised by the Town Council) and Grand Finale celebration with stalls, a music festival, clowns, food and more at the Midhurst Sports Ground. The programme for each festival varies from year to year, but typically includes evening and lunchtime concerts (classical, swing, folk and jazz), an art trail, an artisan fair, a 'family fun day' for young children, theatre and dance performances, a local Gardeners Question Time, a short story competition and numerous workshops on creative skills, plus a range fringe events such as exhibitions, beer festivals, quiz nights, treasure trails and others. The event brings together the whole community to manage the box office, arrange workshops, help with PR and social media, provide security and everything needed for a smooth-running festival.

The Midhurst Medieval Festival takes place annually in the Old Town, in early May, featuring re-enactments, falconry, spinning and weaving demonstrations, have-a-go archery, medieval music, stalls and medieval food.

The architectural heritage of Tudor, Georgian and Victorian buildings in Midhurst is considerable, with 106 listed structures. The Midhurst Society was founded in 1969 to help conserve this heritage. The Society aims to preserve, protect and improve local features of historic or public interest. It promotes high standards of planning and architecture and seeks to enhance the local environment and amenities, in liaison with public authorities. A biannual magazine "Midhurst Magazine" is published to encourage interest in the local past, present and future.

The Knockhundred Shuttles a Midhurst-based mixed Morris Dancing club, meets regularly to practise, and appears in numerous country festivals. The Midhurst Players present 3–4 amateur dramatic productions each year, the Midhurst Art Society and the Midhurst Camera Club each hold summer exhibitions each year, and the Midhurst Choral Society gives periodic recitals.

Film: In 2010 Midhurst featured as a set for the television series Foyle's War. In 2014 the Midhurst Together Group facilitated the community production of the "Midhurst Happy Video", based on the original song by Pharrell Williams.

Social Media: The town has an internet presence with a Town Council website, a "VisitMidhurst" website focused on the information needs of tourists, a community Facebook page, Twitter feed and Pinterest page. About ten community organisations are also active on social media, and many of them have websites.

=== Community facilities ===
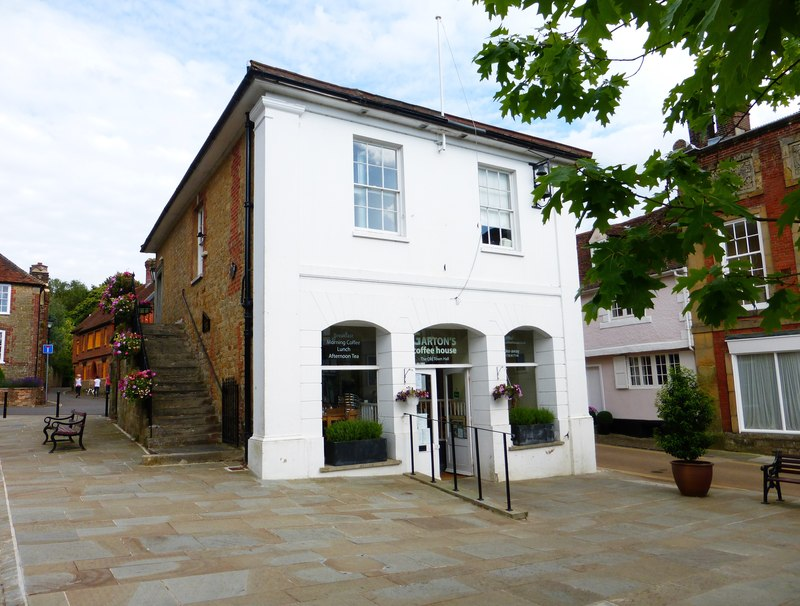
The Old Town Hall

The South Downs National Park, established in 2011, stretches for 87 miles (140 km) between Winchester in the West to Eastbourne and Beachy Head in the East. It encompasses the whole of the South Downs, together with a significant area of the western Weald to the north of the Downs, as far north as Alice Holt near Farnham. The Park's landscapes cover 620 square miles (1,600 km^{2}). The headquarters of the National Park Authority, the South Downs Centre in Capron House, Midhurst is a community hub, an exhibition about the National Park and a green conference centre. It also includes the Midhurst Tourist Information Centre.

The Midhurst Town Trust is a charity responsible for maintaining some of Midhurst's community facilities. The Charity Commissioners Scheme for The Midhurst Town Trust was sealed on 4 February 1910, and has governed the activities of the Trust ever since, with one amendment. Certain properties were vested in the Trust to protect, administer and care for. In addition to the Old Town Hall and the Market Square, the commissioners schedule of property included the Stocks, The Pound, The Curfew Garden, the Royal Arms, Town Mace and Constables Staves. The Trustees meet twice a year. There are currently six trustees: one representative of the Lord of the Manor (Lord Cowdray); Three representatives of Midhurst Town Council; and two co-opted trustees who reside in Midhurst.

The Grange Leisure Centre was opened on 3 March 2014, replacing a nearby earlier building dating from the 1960s. It is owned by Chichester District Council and operated by Westgate Leisure. The centre provides a number of services under one roof. It is a meeting-place for a range of clubs, including bridge, badminton, gymnastics, toddlers, line-dancing, yoga and many others. It includes: a multi-purpose four-court sports hall; a fitness room with state of the art Technogym equipment; two squash courts and a squash viewing area; a dance studio with mirrors that is also used for fitness and community activities; a health suite, including a sauna, steam room and a spa pool; a multi-purpose community hall and community rooms; and a bar and café with Wi-Fi access. The facility overlooks South Pond, with an outdoor seating area.

Community health facilities are provided at the Midhurst Community Hospital in Dodsley Lane.

Library: The local branch of the West Sussex County Library is housed in The Grange Leisure Centre.

Register Office: The Midhurst Branch of the West Sussex Register office is housed in The Grange Leisure Centre, and is open part-time for the registration of Births, Marriages and Deaths.

Clubs and Societies: There are over fifty clubs and societies in Midhurst, covering all aspects of community life. They include groups active in the arts and in crafting activities, in environmental and heritage activities, in social support and welfare activities and in sport and leisure.

Charities: There are over 70 local charities covering Midhurst and the surrounding settlements.

== History ==
Midhurst developed as a Saxon village at a strategic crossroads of what are now the A272 (east-west) and A286 (north-south) routes. There may have been a village there since Roman times. After the Norman Conquest Robert de Montgomery ordered the building of a motte-and-bailey castle on what is now called St Ann's Hill, a strategic bluff on a curve of the River Rother, overlooking the cross-roads and a long stretch of Rother Valley to the north, east and the west, protecting the River Rother crossing. St Ann's Hill may also have been the site of an Iron Age fort

Although there has been a settlement in Midhurst since at least the early Norman period, and probably from Saxon times, the buildings in the Old Town, centred on the Market Square, are principally Tudor in origin. Almost every house in this part of the town dates back to the 16th Century, and parts of a few buildings, such as the old coaching inn that is now the Spread Eagle Hotel, date to the 15th century. Even the apparently more modern North Street is lined with Tudor buildings behind classical and Georgian façades that were added during the 17th and 18th centuries, a time of prosperity for the town. There are also several actual 18th-century buildings scattered throughout the town, and distinctive Victorian and Edwardian developments of terraced housing along the main routes out of Midhurst. During the mid and late 20th Century there was significant housing development to the south of the town, in the Little Midhurst, Holmbush and Fairway areas, which continued into the 21st century.

=== Manorial (pre-modern) period ===
In 1106 Savaric fitz Cana (Fitzcane) received land in Midhurst and the neighbouring village of Easebourne from Henry I, and in 1158 his son built a fortified manor house on St. Anne's Hill. The family later adopted the de Bohun name, and in about 1280 abandoned the fortified manor house to build their principal home on flat land across the River Rother from St. Ann's Hill, in the neighbouring parish of Easebourne, 'at a place called Coudreye' (old French for a "hazel grove"). Between 1284 and 1311 St Ann's Castle was in the hands of the Bishop of Durham, and during that period was largely dismantled.

However "the chapel of St. Denis within the former castle of Midhurst" appears to have escaped the destruction, as it was functioning in 1291, and is referred to in 1367 as standing "in a place called Courtgrene". There is still a house called Court Green beside the current entrance to the castle enclosure. At some period after this date the chapel of St. Dennis was eventually demolished, and the re-built foundation can be seen within the castle curtain wall.

The parish church in Midhurst originated as a medieval chapel dedicated to St Mary Magdalene. In about 1216 the founding charter of a college of priests at Easebourne (re-established about 1230 as a Benedictine nunnery), lists Midhurst amongst its dependent chapels. When Easebourne Priory was suppressed in 1536 and handed to the Fitzwilliam family, the chapel in Midhurst achieved parish church status, and was substantially re-built. The additional dedication of the Church of St. Mary Magdalene to St Denis (also the dedication of the former chapel within the castle) is first recorded in 1764.

The little town developed outside the castle, mainly to service it and the immediate surrounding area, and to provide a market place for local agricultural surpluses. It was bounded by an escarpment dropping in the north to the Town Meadow, in the east to the River Rother and in the South to a tributary to the Rother. To the west it was bounded until the late 12th century by a 1.5-metre deep ditch, with a dyke and pallisade, approximately where Duck (or Dyke) Lane now lies.

Other than the castle, the principal engine of growth for the town was its regular market, for which the earliest known reference is in 1223. Many of the early buildings were grouped around the market area. These houses were built of highly perishable materials, and none have survived. Most would have been about a perch wide (about 5 metres), with long gardens at the rear, opening onto back lanes. On market days country people would bring their produce to sell at stalls in the open air. Apart from foodstuffs, the principal trades were in wool, cloth and leather, and related trades such as weaving, whitening, quilt-making and cobbling. These were largely determined by the predominance of shepherding in the surrounding agricultural area.

Midhurst was a 'free borough' and in 1278 was said to have been so from time beyond memory. It was governed by a bailiff who was elected by the burgesses from among themselves. The bailiff regulated the market by ensuring the assize of bread and ale, appointing two ale-tasters yearly, and acted as clerk of the market. Disputes over the respective rights and duties of town and manor were settled in 1409 by an agreement whereby Michael Bageley and six other named burgesses agreed, on behalf of themselves and their successors, to pay 40 shillings a year to Sir John de Bohun, Lord of the Manor, and his heirs, for the right to take the market tolls. In return they were required to hold both the three-weekly courts and to conduct two 'law days' in the name of Sir John. If they failed for a whole year to hold the courts the agreement should lapse, and if they neglected to keep the streets and ditches in order the lord's manorial officers should be responsible for apprehending offenders, but were required to hand over any fines to the burgesses. This arrangement was confirmed in 1537 by Sir William Fitzwilliam, after his purchase of the manor.

Midhurst was first represented in the Parliament of 1301 and was consistently represented from 1382 onwards. From these early beginnings, and until the Great Reform Act of 1832, the town had two members of parliament. The electors were the owners of certain properties, which were marked by "burgage stones", one of these stones remains and can be seen with a descriptive plaque embedded in the wall of a building just north of the Old Library (Council Offices) on Knockhundred Row.

=== Early modern period ===
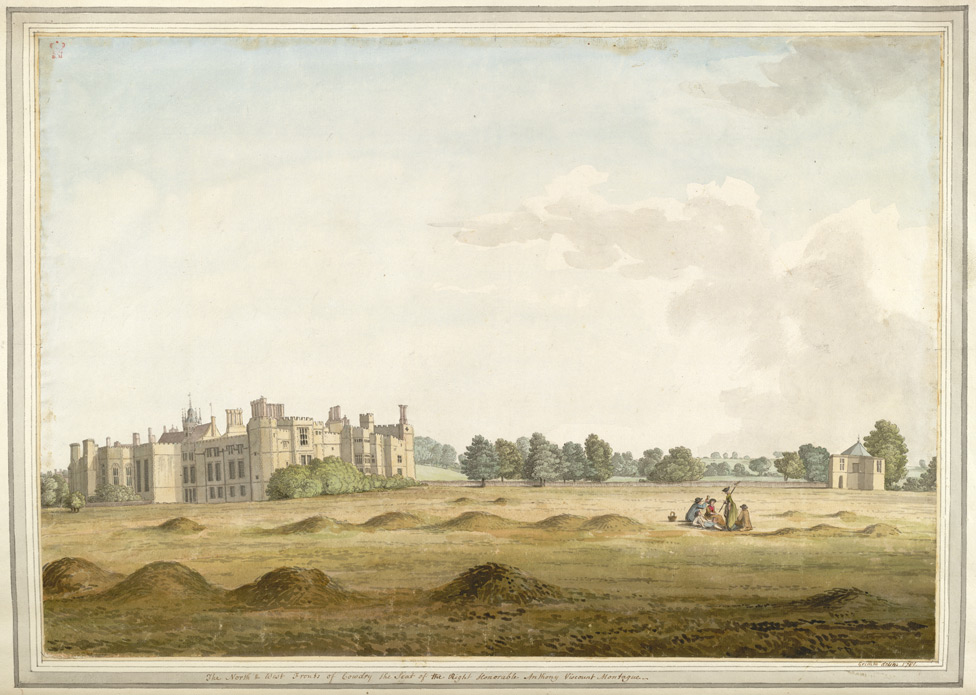
Cowdray House by Samuel Hieronymus Grimm 1781, from site of modern Polo Ground. St. Ann's Hill is in background, just to right of the House.

The event that had the greatest effect on the town in the Tudor period was the re-building of Cowdray House, which commenced in the 1520s. Sir David Owen, illegitimate son of Owen Tudor and uncle to Henry VII, began construction of the building that is now in ruins beside the River Rother, on the site of the former building called Coudreye, which he had acquired upon the death of his wife Mary Bohun. Her family had built the original house there between 1273 and 1284, after they abandoned their original castle on St Ann's Hill. The rebuilding continued after 1529, when Sir David Owen's son sold it to Sir William Fitzwilliam.

The Fitzwilliams were a staunch Catholic family, and remained so throughout the English Reformation and beyond, making Midhurst a centre of Catholicism into the 17th century. Nevertheless, the Fitzwilliams were courtiers who maintained generally good relationships with the royal family and benefitted from considerable enrichment during the Dissolution of the Monasteries, at its height between 1536 and 1538. They were therefore able to inject vast sums of money into the property and its mansion. Completed about 1540, the estate had a major impact on the local economy. Enormous amounts of food were required to feed the approximately 200 servants, huge numbers of family and visitors. About thirty separate dishes were served to anything up to 500 people at the main daily meal. Similarly, the building works themselves, using brick and stone rather than the locally produced materials of other local buildings at the time (typically timber framing infilled with wattle and daub), would have required vast amounts of transport, storage and accounting, bringing artists, craftspeople and specialists of many kinds to the town, driving the development of a local middle class. There are two wall paintings in the town said to have been painted by artists working on the mansion who were lodging in the houses concerned. One is in the building on North Street currently occupied by the Olive and Vine Restaurant and Bar, and the other is in Elizabeth House, beside the Swan Inn in Red Lion Street. They are thought to be either practice images for the work in the mansion, or painted in lieu of rent. The image in North Street tells the story of King Ahab robbing Naboth of his family vineyard, reflecting the despair that the mostly Catholic population of the town felt in being forbidden by the monarch to practise their religion.

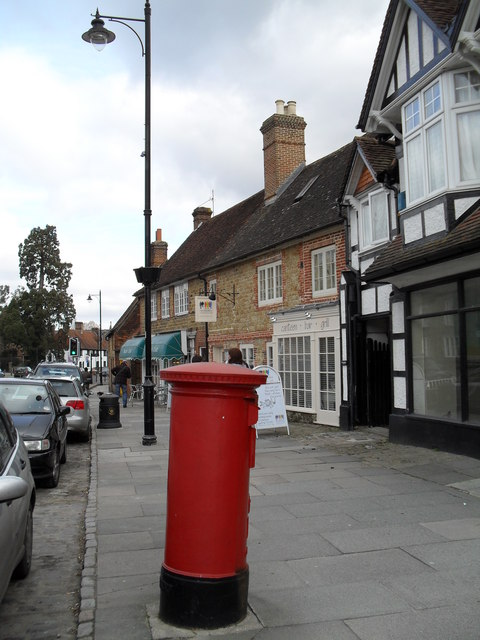
Part of North Street looking north

The extension of the town along the former lane to Easebourne towards the new mansion, which had begun in the early 14th century with the building of the first mansion on the river-side site, now intensified. This contributed to the economic expansion, as merchants built new houses and shops on North Street to facilitate their dealings with Cowdray House. It was during this period that the Angel Hotel was built, as a coaching house in response to the growing travel. Fifty years later, it hosted many of the Pilgrim Fathers, on their way from London and East Anglia to Plymouth.

The local labour market was distorted as workers were diverted from their conventional tasks to work as servants or contribute to the building. Town officials were concerned at the redirection of the Midhurst economy away from its traditional centre around the market place and towards the newly dynamic Cowdray House. The bailiff and burgesses petitioned Sir Anthony Fitzwilliam to give them a plot of land on which to build a market house near the church, as a focus for commerce in the Old Town. This was built in the market square in 1551, and although much altered since, it probably looked similar to the market house currently at the Weald and Downland Museum, with open bays on the ground floor, and an upstairs room for official use.

In 1605, the owner of Cowdray House, Anthony-Maria Browne, 2nd Viscount Montagu, was briefly arrested in connection with the Gunpowder Plot. He was suspected as a plotter because of his Catholic religion and connections with several of the known plotters. Among others, he had briefly employed Guy Fawkes, as a footman. In addition he had stayed away from Parliament on 5 November following a warning from Robert Catesby, the leader of the plot. Anthony-Maria Browne spent about a year in the Tower of London, died in 1629 and is buried in Midhurst Church. Later in the 17th century, this influence began to wane. By 1621, there were about forty households of recusants in Midhurst. In 1634, one John Arismandy appointed John Cope and Richard Shelley to administer certain moneys after his death to provide a priest for the poor Catholics of Midhurst, to say masses every week for his soul and 'my lords ancestors'. This deed was found in the 19th century in a box hidden in the chimney of an old house with rosaries and other religious objects.

In the mid-1630s, Sir Anthony Browne employed the fashionable cook, Robert May to be the chef at Cowdray House. In 1565, he published one of the earliest British cook-books – The Accomplisht Cook.

In 1637, an ecclesiastical court case records parishioners of Midhurst playing cricket during evening prayer on Sunday, 26 February (Julian), one of the sport's earliest references.

By the mid-17th century, the Anglican church was well established and Catholicism apparently declining, although about a quarter of families remained Catholic, and 30 years later there were a similar proportion of Nonconformist families. In 1642, during the English Civil War, the 'Protestation' in support of the Anglican Church was signed by 207 men in Midhurst, but 54 'recusant Papists' refused at first to sign it. Two days later 35 of these did sign, probably excepting the special clause denouncing the Roman Faith, as did their colleagues at Easebourne, where there was an equal number of recusants. By 1676, the estimated numbers of Conformists (Anglicans) was recorded as being 341, of Roman Catholics 56, and of Nonconformists 50.

=== Modern period ===
In 1831 there were only 41 eligible voters and Midhurst was considered a rotten borough. In the Great Reform Act of 1832 Midhurst was reduced to one Member of Parliament and the constituency was expanded to include most of the surrounding villages.

Cowdray House and estate was owned by the Montagu family until 1843, when it was bought by the 6th Earl of Egmont, who sold it in 1910 to Sir Weetman Dickinson Pearson who in 1917 became Viscount Cowdray. The current owner is the 4th Viscount.

There was a gasworks adjacent to The Wharf just south of St. Ann's Hill; The Wharf is the last remnant of a once busy navigation canal, the Rother Navigation, described in the listing for a bridge over the former canal.

In 2002, Country Life magazine rated Midhurst the second best place to live in Britain, after Alnwick.

== Geology ==
Midhurst is situated in the Wealden Greensand that lies between the South Downs and the Low Weald: that is, between the open rolling chalklands of the Downs, and the sandstones and clays of the western Weald, exemplified by the densely wooded slopes, hills and steep valleys around and especially to the north of Midhurst. The solid geology in the vicinity of Midhurst is sedimentary rock, as throughout Sussex. Descending northwards from the South Downs through Midhurst towards the Weald, the rocks become progressively older. The historic core of the town lies almost entirely on the Sandgate Formation (or beds), which form part of the Lower Greensand Group (Lower Cretaceous) while the southern suburbs are built on the sandstones of the Folkestone Formation. The drift geology of the Midhurst area comprises alluvium following the course of the River Rother and its tributaries, together with associated river terrace deposits of gravels, sands and silts.

== Landmarks ==
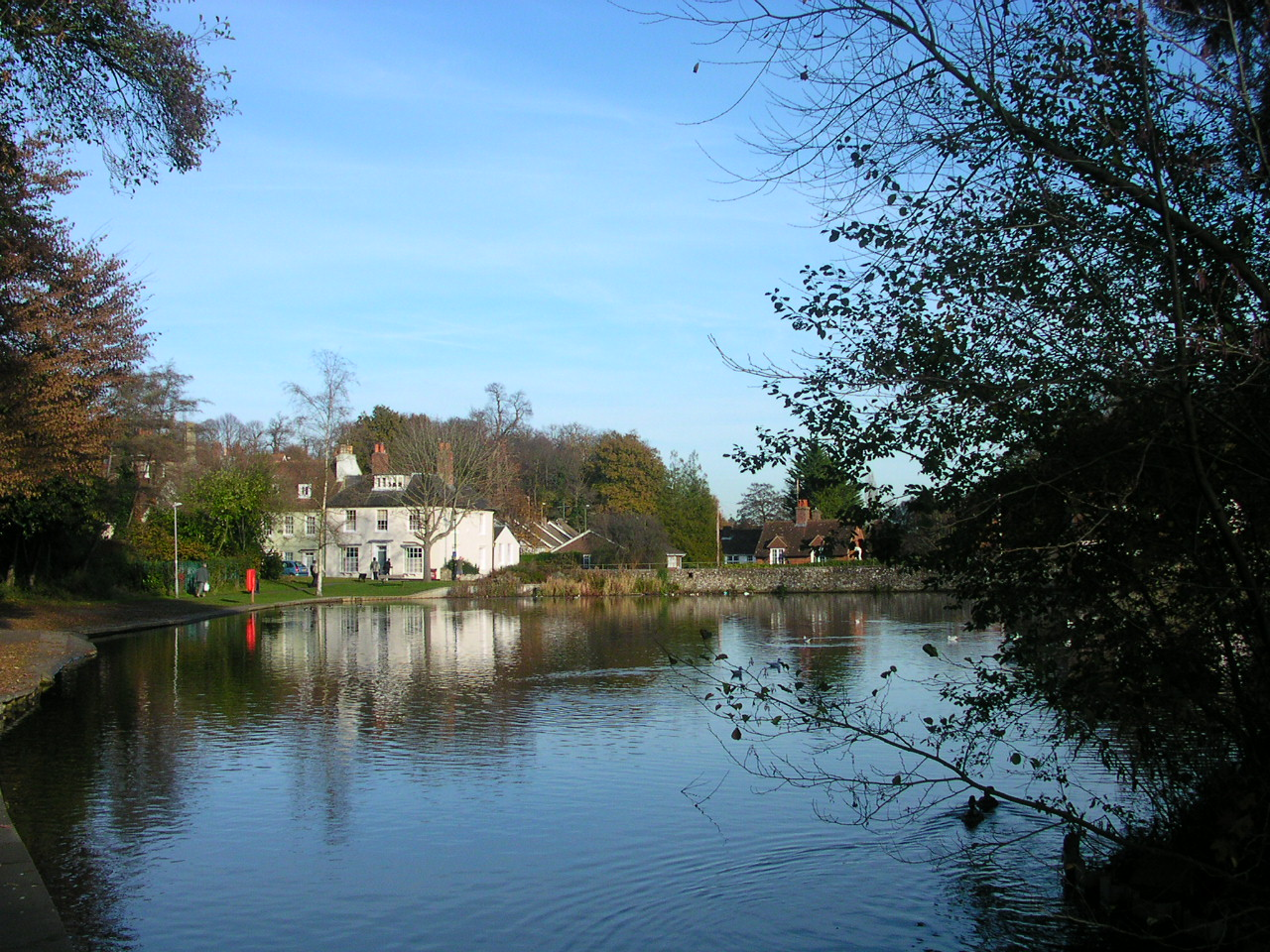
South Pond

South Pond is the second oldest structure in Midhurst, second only to St. Ann's Castle: it is thought to have been dammed in the early 12th century as a fish-pond for the Castle. To the west the South Mill was in existence by 1284, and used initially to grind corn. In 1634 it was converted to a fulling mill, and in the mid-1800s it was converted again to leather production. The pond is prone to silting due to its underlying greensand geology, and has in recent years become polluted and lifeless, in large part due to over-population of ducks as a result of artificial feeding. The South Pond Group was established in 2012 to conserve and develop the area around the South Pond as a wildlife corridor. Activities include clearance parties, water quality monitoring, newsletters, talks and maintaining notice and interpretation boards. Major renovation works, involving dredging and establishing reed and waterplant beds to reconstitute the natural ecology, capable of supporting a full range of pond life, were undertaken in 2014– 2015, under the leadership of the South Pond Group with community support.

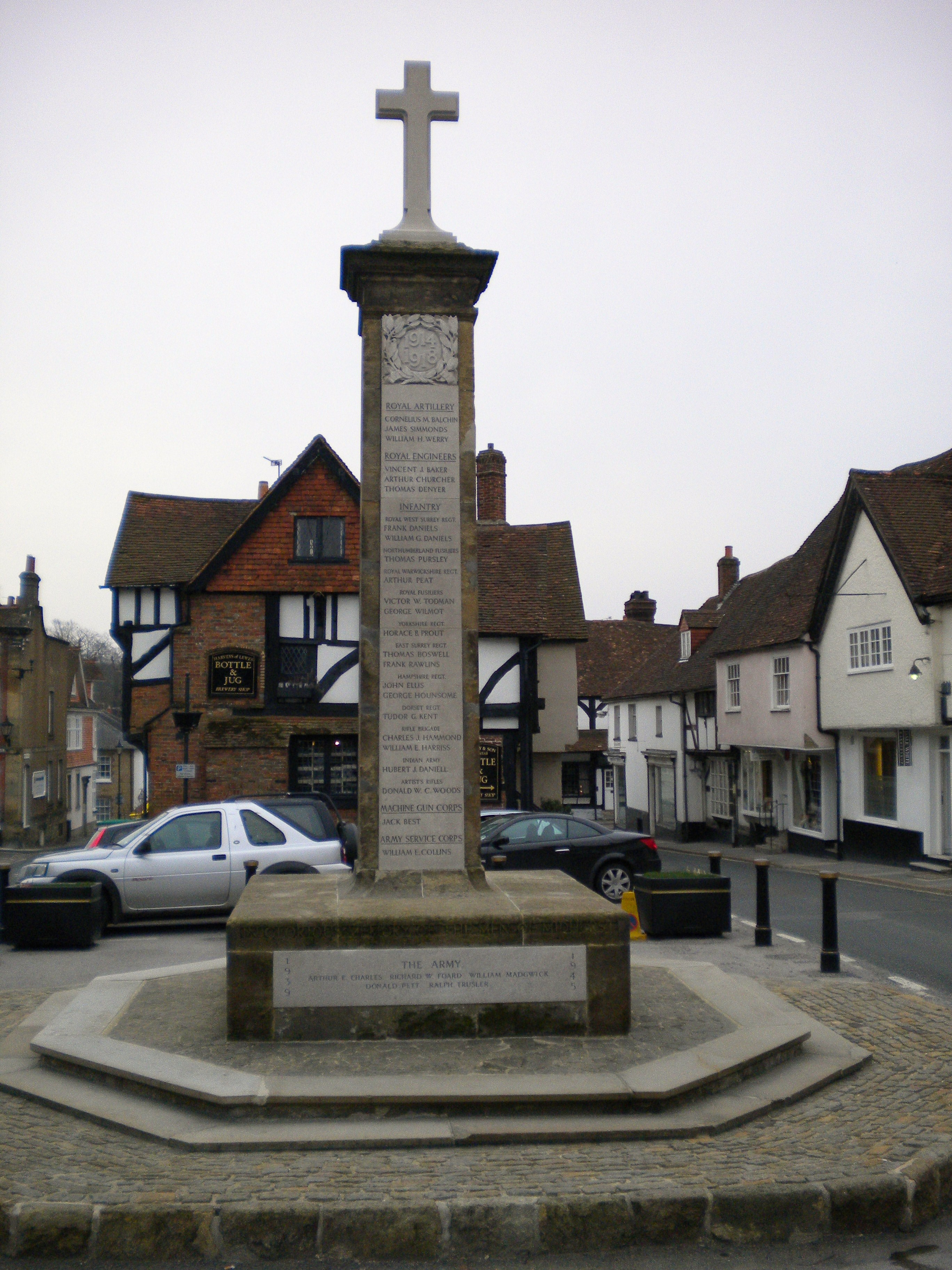
Midhurst War Memorial

The Midhurst War Memorial is situated outside the Midhurst parish church at the confluence of Red Lion Street and Church Hill, adjacent to the Market Square. It occupies land donated to the town for this purpose by Major Harold Pearson. Mr. Percy Oliver (1885–1949), a local stonemason, was commissioned to build and carve the memorial in accordance with the design of Sir Ashton Webb, who also designed Admiralty Arch in London. The War Memorial was unveiled in 1923. It is aligned on the axis of the nave of the church and consists of a square pillar set upon a square plinth which stands on an octagonal base of two steps within a kerbed, cobbled area. It has been constructed from dressed sandstone, probably from a local quarry. The names of fifty men who fell during the First World War, together with their service or regiment, are inscribed on panels of limestone which have been fixed to the north and south faces of the pillar. In 1929 a proposal to install oak posts and chains was dropped due to cost. In April 1947 it was decided to add the names of the dead of World War II, and Mr Oliver was asked to fix a tablet to the War Memorial. However, it was not until 1960 that it was finally agreed to add these panels, and the work was completed in 1962. In 2014 the name of a Royal Marine killed in the Afghan War in 2012 was added to the plinth. The Memorial is in the care of the Town Trust. Each year on Remembrance Sunday, the Midhurst Branch of the Royal British Legion organises a service of remembrance at the War Memorial.

== Listed buildings ==
There are 106 buildings in Midhurst listed with Historic England as having special architectural or historic interest, while the earthworks and ruins of St. Ann's Castle have been designated as a Scheduled Monument. The Parish Church of St. Mary Magdalene and St. Denis and the Spread Eagle Hotel are both listed Grade II*, while the remainder are Grade II. At least 42 of the listed buildings are in the Old Town. Of the listed buildings, two recognisably predate 1500; six are 16th century; 30 are 17th century; 32 are 18th century; 22 are early 19th century; one is from 1841 to 1880; and one (a telephone box) is from 1914 to 1945. As this is a K6 model, introduced in 1935, it must date from the latest decade of this period.

The bridge over the River Rother, which forms the boundary between Midhurst parish's North Street and Easebourne parish's Easebourne Lane, is a listed structure, built in 1826.

The former King Edward VII Hospital and Sanatorium is a Grade II* listed building that is often recorded as being in Midhurst, but is actually located in the parish of Easebourne.

== Transport ==
=== Rail ===
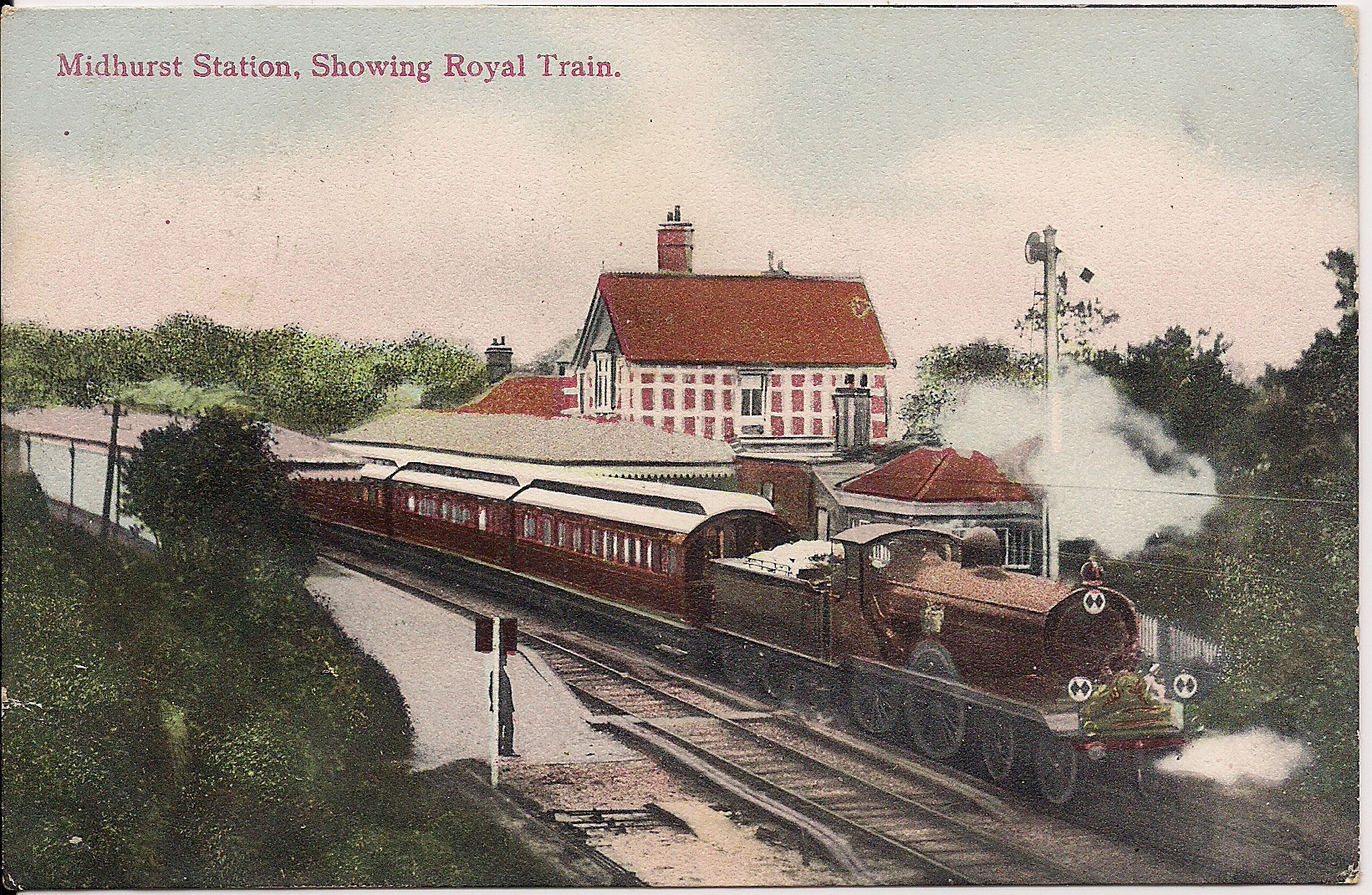
A royal train at the (LBSCR) station pre 1907

Midhurst was linked by three lines: one from Petersfield in 1864, one from Pulborough in 1866 and one from Chichester in 1881. The line from Chichester to Midhurst closed in 1935 to passengers and in 1951 to goods traffic.

There were two stations, the London Brighton and South Coast Railway's (Chichester to Pulborough) and the London and South Western Railway's. All passenger services were concentrated on the LB&SCR station in 1925 by the Southern Railway. The last passenger trains ran in 1955. The line remained open, from Pulborough only, for goods traffic until 1964.

=== Road ===
The A272 runs through the town east and west. The A286 runs through the town north and south.

The town is served by four regular bus routes. Stagecoach operate numbers 60 to Chichester, 70 to Guildford via Haslemere and 1 to Worthing via Petworth; Emsworth operate 92 to Petersfield via Rogate.

== Media ==
Local news and television programmes are provided by BBC South and ITV Meridian. Television signals are received from the nearby Midhurst TV transmitter situated northeast of the town.

Local radio stations are BBC Radio Sussex on 104.8 FM, Heart South on 97.5 FM, Greatest Hits Radio West Sussex on 106.6 FM, and V2 Radio, a community online-based station.

The town's local newspaper is the Midhurst and Petworth Observer, published on Thursdays.

== Education ==
The secondary school in the town is Midhurst Rother College. It succeeds the former grammar school, founded in 1672. It is an Academy school formed following the closure of the grammar school and Midhurst Intermediate School in January 2009. In 2012/13 it was designated as "outstanding" by Ofsted. Girls were first admitted to the school in 1956.

There is a state primary school in Midhurst, the Church of England Primary School, in Ashfield Road. Other state primary schools in the catchment area include those of Easebourne and Stedham. In Easebourne there is also a private primary school, Conifers.

From 1888 to 2009, the Sisters of Mercy of St Margaret's Convent, Midhurst ran a school in the town.

== Religious sites ==
The Midhurst Deanery is a Deanery of the Church of England comprising 22 churches in the Rother Valley between Midhurst and Petersfield.

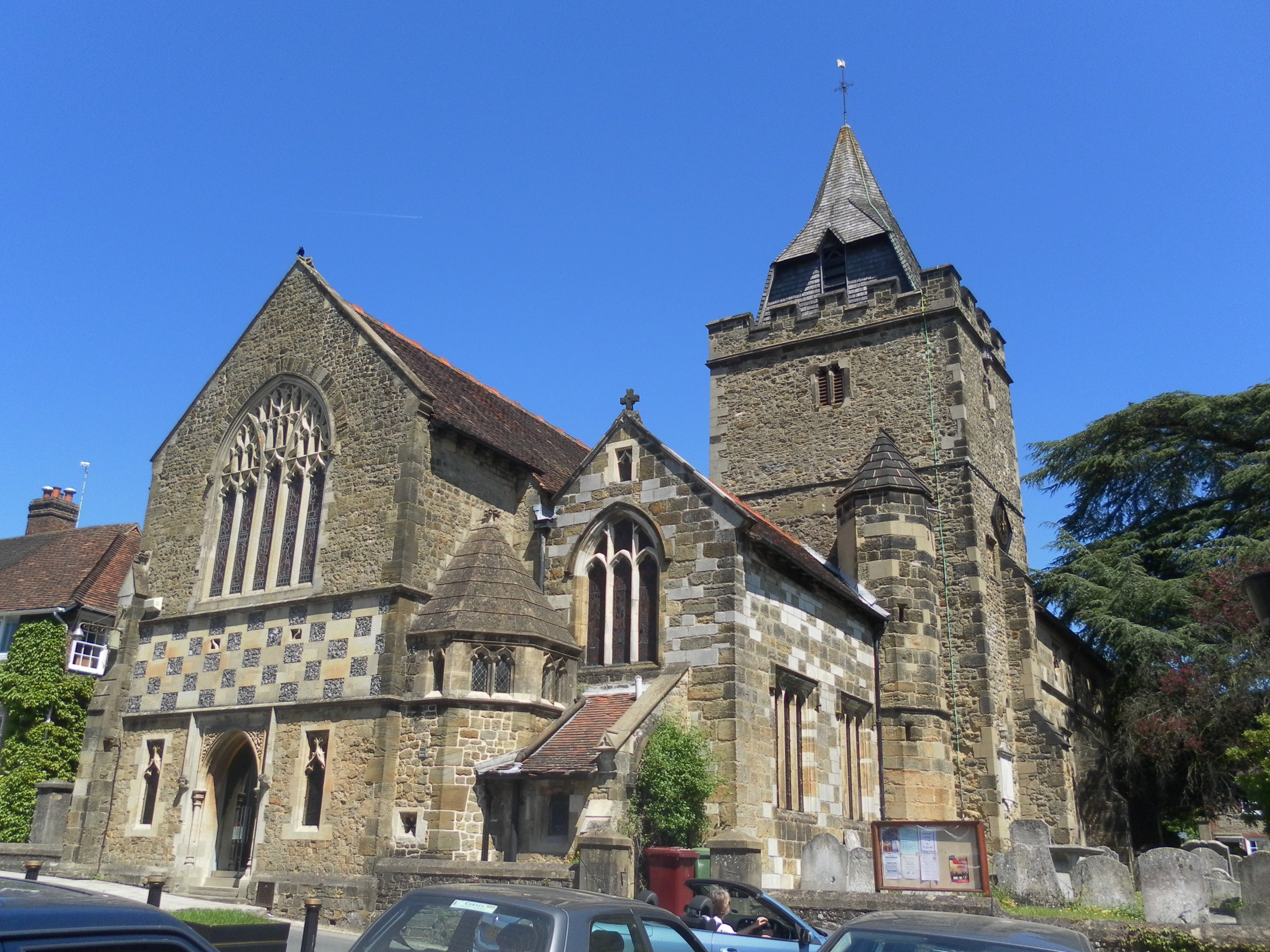
Parish church of St Mary Magdalene and St Denys

The Anglican parish church is St Mary Magdalene and St Denys, in the market square. It is a listed building. The interior of the church has undergone much restoration and change and little evidence exists of its medieval heritage. Consisting of chancel and nave flanked by aisles on both sides, the church was largely rebuilt in the Perpendicular style in 1422, towards the end of Henry V's reign. The base of the tower is 13th century. The tower top, south nave and chancel arcades are 16th century in the perpendicular style. The rest of the building is from 1882 or later.

The Roman Catholic parish church is the Church of the Divine Motherhood and St Francis of Assisi, on Bepton Road. It was built in 1957, replacing an earlier church on Rumbolds Hill, which was built in 1869 by C.A. Buckler in the early English style and is now part of the Wheatsheaf pub. The new building is of sandstone in the shape of a segment of a circle with the rounded off point forming an eastern apse. The western arc is divided into seven sections by vertical stone fins, six of which are glazed, leaving the doorway in the central section with a Madonna and Child above. There is a circular skylight above the altar. The stations of the cross are carved on a continuous stone band along the side walls. There is a tall separate bell tower linked to the church by an open colonnade.

Midhurst Methodist Church is a flint masonry building with brick quoins standing to the north of the old grammar school buildings. A large Gothic style west window looks towards the ruins of Cowdray House.

There is a Kingdom Hall of Jehovah's Witnesses on Holmbush Way.

== International relations ==
Midhurst is twinned with

- Baiersbronn, Baden-Württemberg, Germany
- Nogent-le-Rotrou, Eure-et-Loir, France

== Sport ==
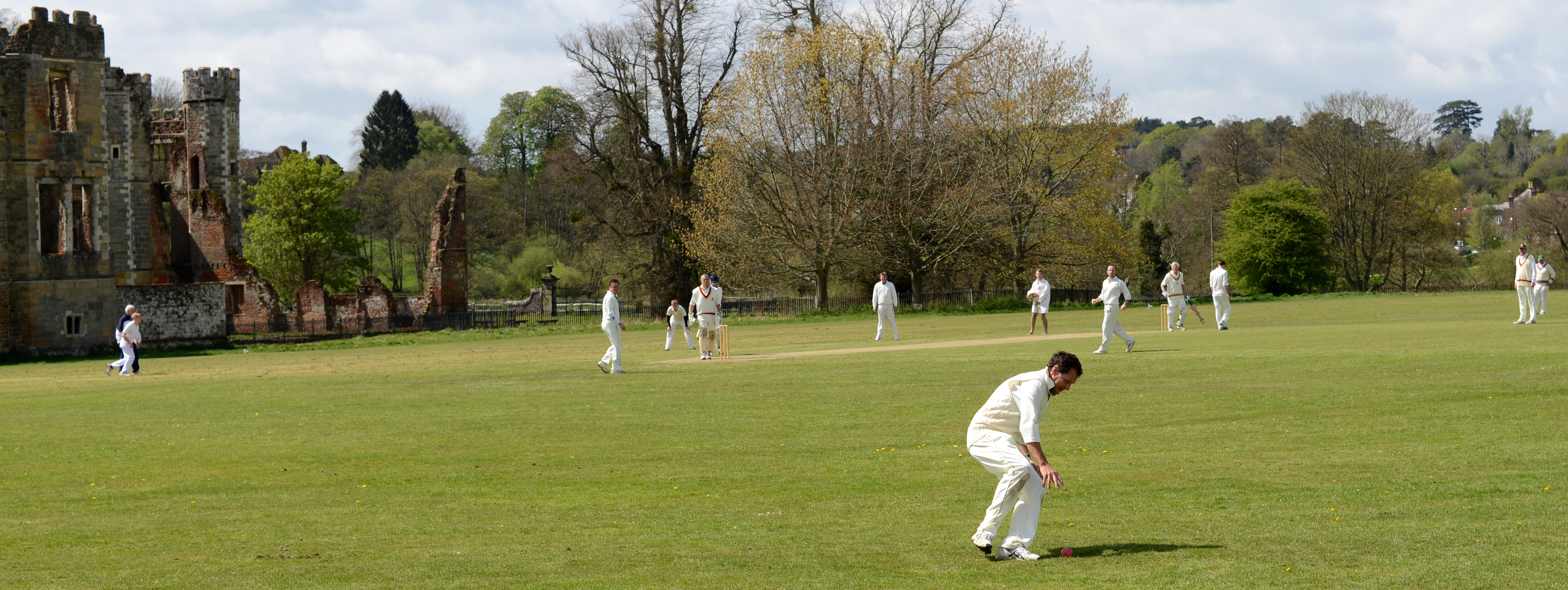
April 2015, Midhurst CC game against Headley 3 in the I Anson league

The Midhurst Sports Association (MSA) owns the lease, runs and maintains the Sports Pavilion on the Midhurst Sports Ground, next to Cowdray Ruins. The MSA is also the umbrella group for the Midhurst Cricket, Rugby and Stoolball Clubs who currently hold individual leases for the playing fields.

The Midhurst and Easebourne Football Club is a non-league football team, with a ground at Dodsley Road in the adjoining village of Easebourne. There is also a variety of youth football teams run by the club, and a walking football club for the over-50s and those with injuries.

== Notable people ==
- Stephen Bernard, academic, was at school in Midhurst.
- Richard Cobden, politician and leading figure of the Anti-Corn Law League was born nearby at Heyshott in 1804, attended school in Midhurst, and spent much of his later life at his family home in Heyshott, Dunford farmhouse.
- Charles James Fox was Member of Parliament for Midhurst between 1768 and 1774.
- Henry VIII visited Midhurst in 1538 and 1545, his son Edward VI came in 1554 and his daughter Elizabeth I in 1591.
- Vic Mitchell (1934-2021), author and publisher, lived in Midhurst from 1964 until his death.
- Hugh Pollard, adventurer, firearms expert and secret agent, retired to Midhurst after WW2.
- Anya Seton stayed at the Spread Eagle Hotel researching her novel Green Darkness, set in Tudor England, and in which Cowdray House, St. Ann's Hill and the Spread Eagle feature prominently.
- H. G. Wells, the essayist and novelist, who was a pupil and then a pupil teacher at Midhurst Grammar School in 1882 and 1883. Midhurst features as "Wimblehurst" in several of Well's novels, such as Tono-Bungay.
