= List of current places of worship in Chichester District =

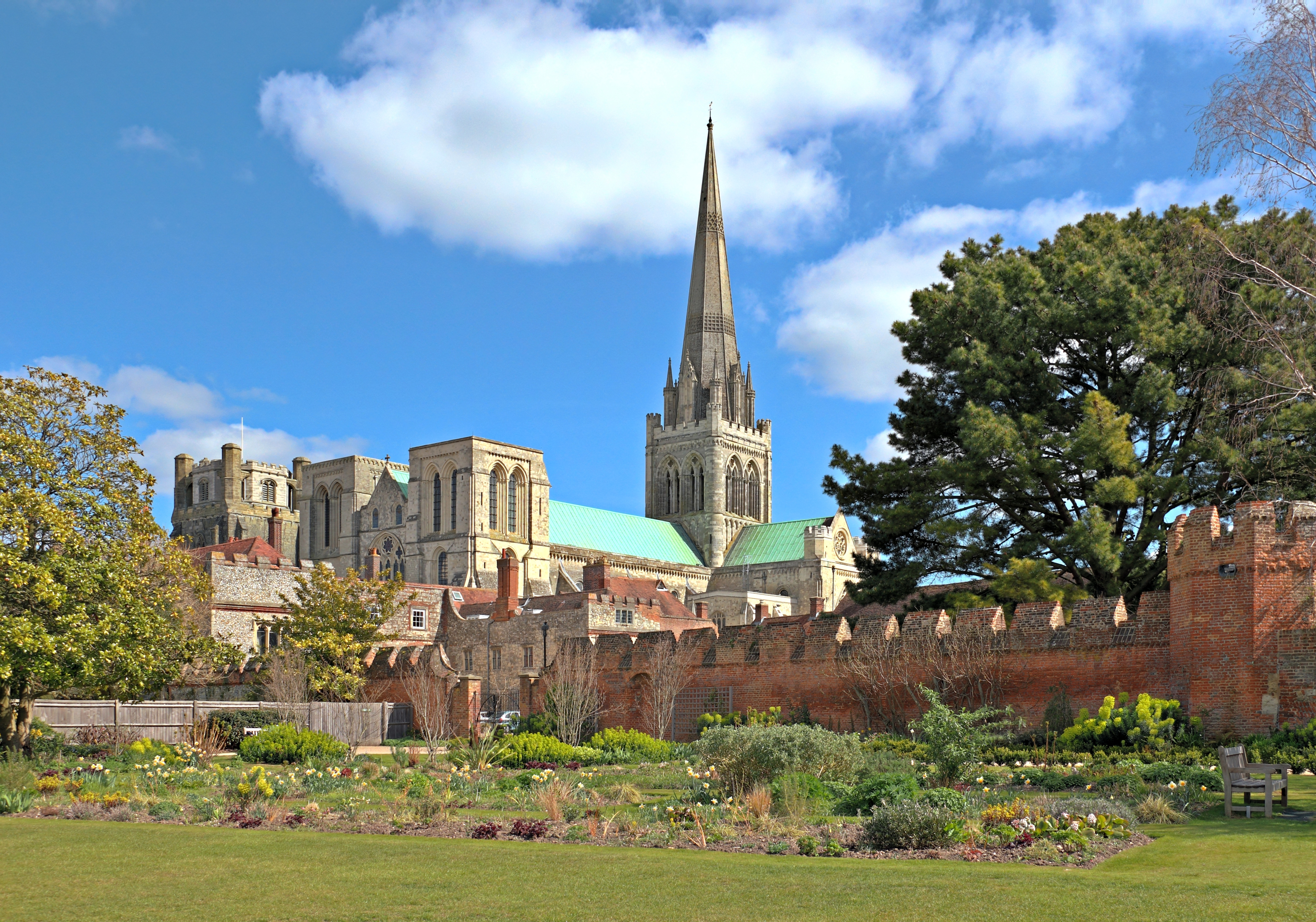
Chichester Cathedral has been the seat of the Bishop of Chichester since the 11th century.

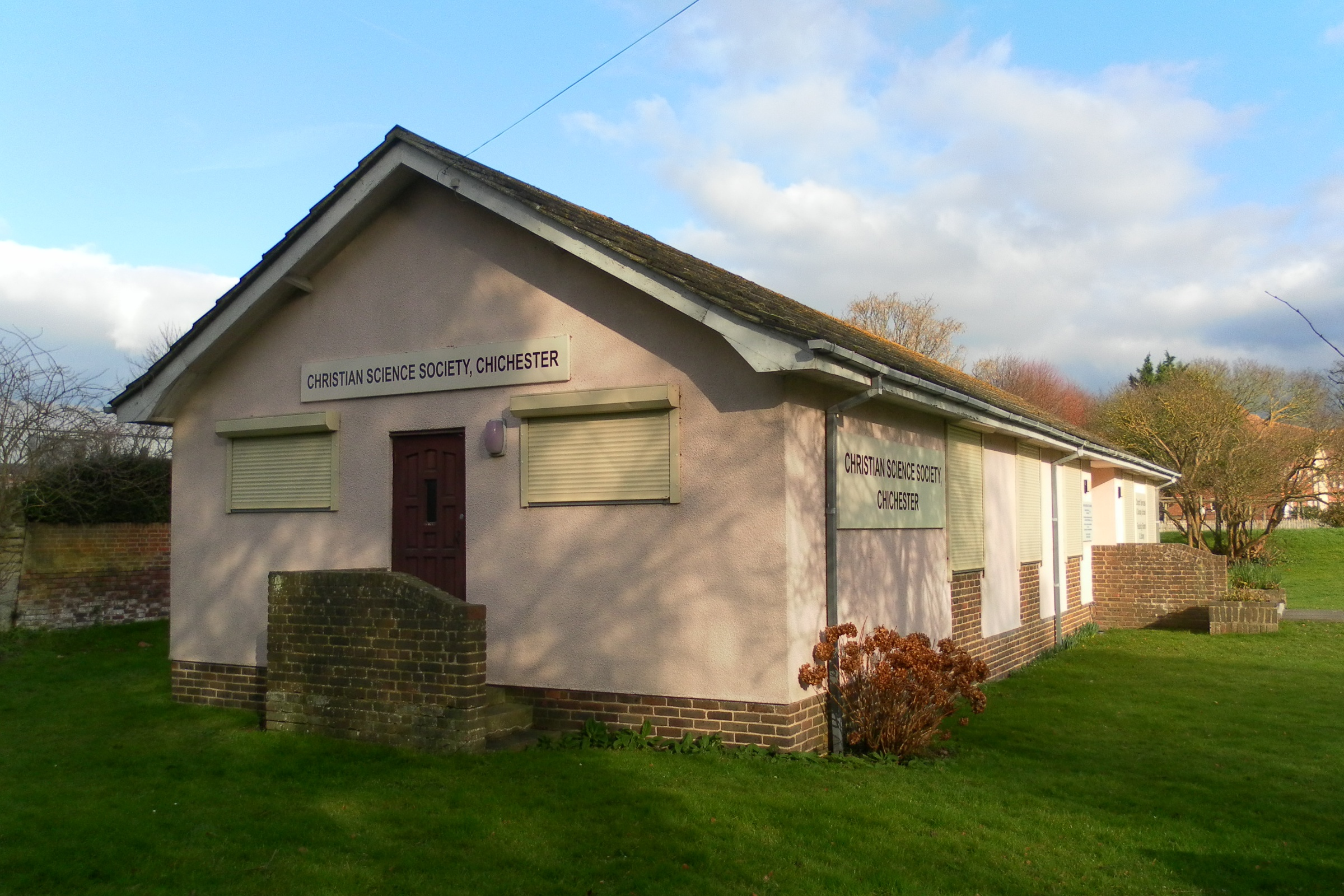
Local adherents of the Church of Christ, Scientist worship at this simple building in Chichester city centre.

There are more than 130 places of worship in the district of Chichester in the English county of West Sussex. Various Christian denominations are served, and there is also a large Buddhist monastery in Chithurst, one of the small villages which make up the largely rural area. The ancient city of Chichester, founded in Roman times and always the most populous settlement in the district, has been a centre of Christian worship since 1075, when its cathedral was built. However, nearby Selsey had its own cathedral 400 years earlier: Saint Wilfrid established an episcopal see there and used it as a base from which to convert Sussex to Christianity. Coastal erosion forced the bishopric to move inland to Chichester, and it has been the centre of the Anglican Diocese of Chichester ever since.

The majority of the district's residents identify themselves as Christian, and most villages have churches. These include tiny villages, such as Coates (whose church has been described as "enchanting and toy-like"), Didling (whose church remains oil-lit) and the Mardens, four scattered farming communities. Churches that are still in use for public worship can also be found in the grounds of private country estates, as at Burton Park and Stansted Park. The most numerous churches are Anglican churches serving the Church of England, the country's Established Church, though many other denominations are represented. Roman Catholicism, historically strong in West Sussex, has several churches for its adherents; Evangelical and Free Churches are found in the main settlements and in small villages; Methodists, Baptists and members of the United Reformed Church each have several churches; and smaller denominations such as the Assemblies of God, Christian Scientists, Jehovah's Witnesses, Quakers and Latter-day Saints (Mormons) have places of worship in the city of Chichester.

English Heritage has awarded listed status to 84 current church buildings in the district. A building is defined as "listed" when it is placed on a statutory register of buildings of "special architectural or historic interest" in accordance with the Planning (Listed Buildings and Conservation Areas) Act 1990. The Department for Culture, Media and Sport, a Government department, is responsible for this; English Heritage, a non-departmental public body, acts as an agency of the department to administer the process and advise the department on relevant issues. There are three grades of listing status: Grade I, the highest, is defined as being of "exceptional interest"; Grade II* is used for "particularly important buildings of more than special interest"; and Grade II, the lowest, is used for buildings of "special interest". As of February 2021, there were 80 buildings with Grade I status, 114 with Grade II* status and 3,057 with Grade II status in the district.

== Overview of the district and its places of worship ==
The district of Chichester is on the west side of West Sussex.

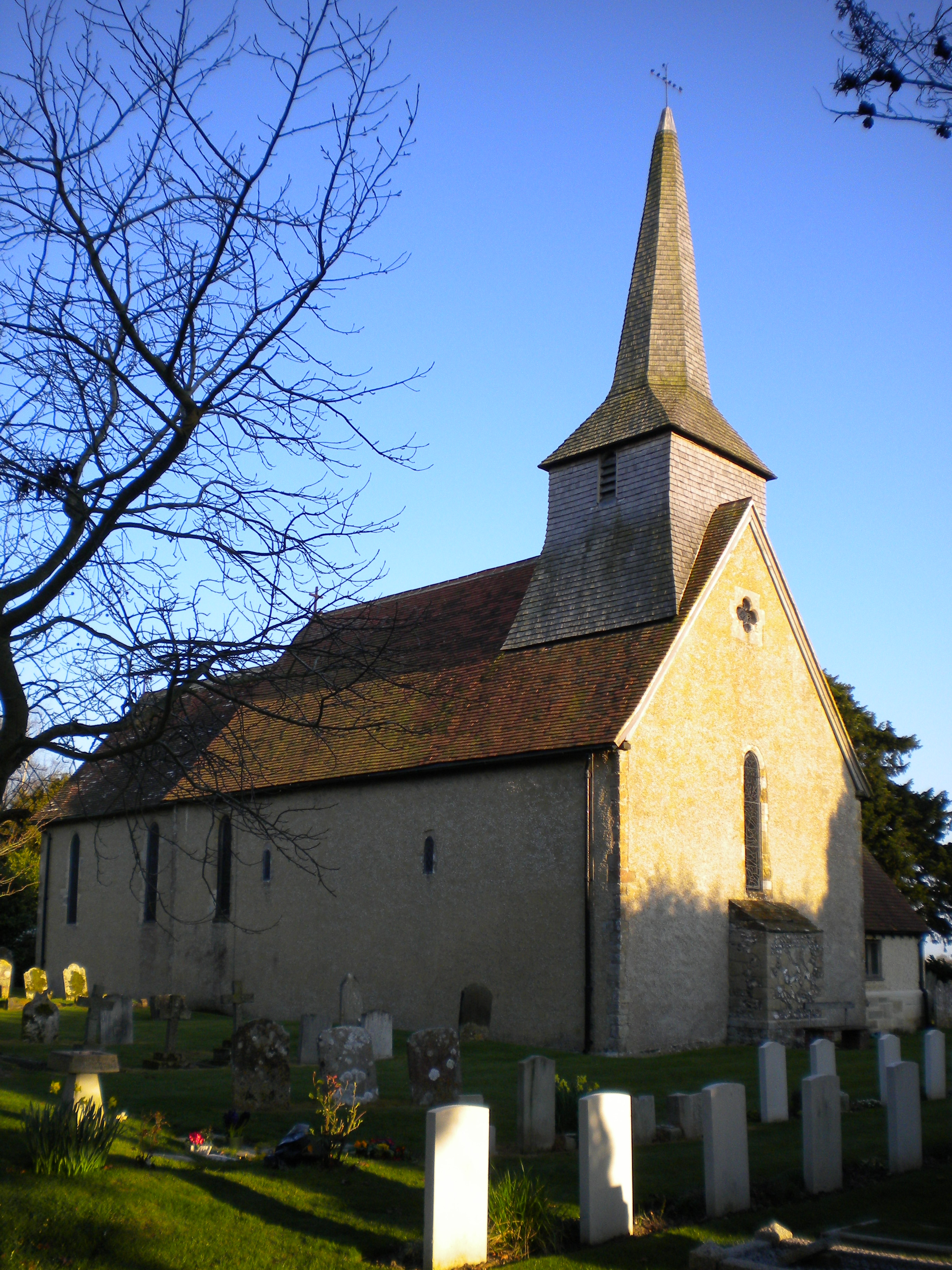
Villages such as Tangmere have ancient parish churches.

The district of Chichester covers about 300 square miles (780 km^{2}) and takes up most of the western half of West Sussex. Clockwise from the south, it has a coastline on the English Channel, then is bordered by the borough of Havant and the district of East Hampshire in the county of Hampshire; the borough of Waverley in the county of Surrey; and the districts of Horsham and Arun in West Sussex. The estimated population in 2009 was 112,600. The district's largest centre of population is the city of Chichester, with 23,731 residents at the time of the 2001 Census. Otherwise, small towns, villages and hamlets characterise the area; the civil parishes of Midhurst (4,889 residents), Petworth (2,775), Selsey (9,875) and Southbourne (6,001) are the next most populous places.

There are many ancient churches serving followers of the Church of England, the country's state religion. At Bosham, the church has 8th-century origins, and many churches in the Manhood Peninsula area around Selsey reflect its historic importance as the base from which St Wilfrid evangelised the Kingdom of the South Saxons, as Sussex was historically known. Many were built to a large scale—such as the former priory churches at Boxgrove and Easebourne, now reduced in size—but the remote downland villages that characterise the area often have tiny, simple churches that have seen little alteration since the 11th or 12th century. Single-cell (nave and chancel in one room) or two-cell (nave and chancel separated by a chancel arch, with no aisles) layouts are common: Didling, East Marden, North Marden (with its rare apsidal end) and Terwick are examples.

Demolition of ancient churches in favour of new buildings was uncommon in this part of Sussex, but this happened at Duncton (at the request of a local nobleman) and at Hunston, where the medieval building was ruinous. More common was the restoration and reconstruction of buildings during the Victorian era, sometimes drastically. Bignor, Eartham, Fernhurst, Fishbourne and Graffham are among the villages whose churches were transformed in the mid- to late 19th century. Gordon Macdonald Hills, who conducted "particularly damaging restorations" at more than 30 Sussex churches, was active at several places in Chichester district, including Birdham, East Lavant, Westhampnett and West Itchenor.

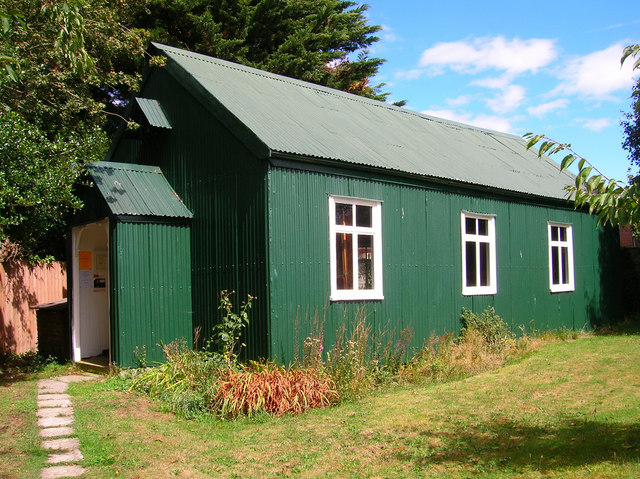
This unusual tin tabernacle serves residents of Woodmancote.

More churchbuilding took place in the 19th century in the growing city of Chichester (the expansive St Paul's and several others now closed) and in large parishes which had a single parish church but several centres of population. Residents of Plaistow and Loxwood no longer had to worship at Kirdford or Wisborough Green after churches were built in 1851 and 1900 respectively; Camelsdale gained a chapel of ease to Fernhurst in 1906; and Southbourne parish was carved out of Westbourne in 1878 after a church was built in the village two years earlier. Mission halls and chapels of ease continued to be provided throughout the 20th century to meet population growth: brick-built church halls which could also be used for worship were put up near Bosham and Nutbourne railway stations (the latter replaced an older mission hall in nearby Hambrook), and a similar building was erected for residents of the Summersdale area of Chichester in the 1930s. Woodmancote in Westbourne parish is served by a prefabricated tin tabernacle of a type that is now rare in England, and in Graffham village centre is a hall that is used for some Sunday evening services by the clergy of the parish church.

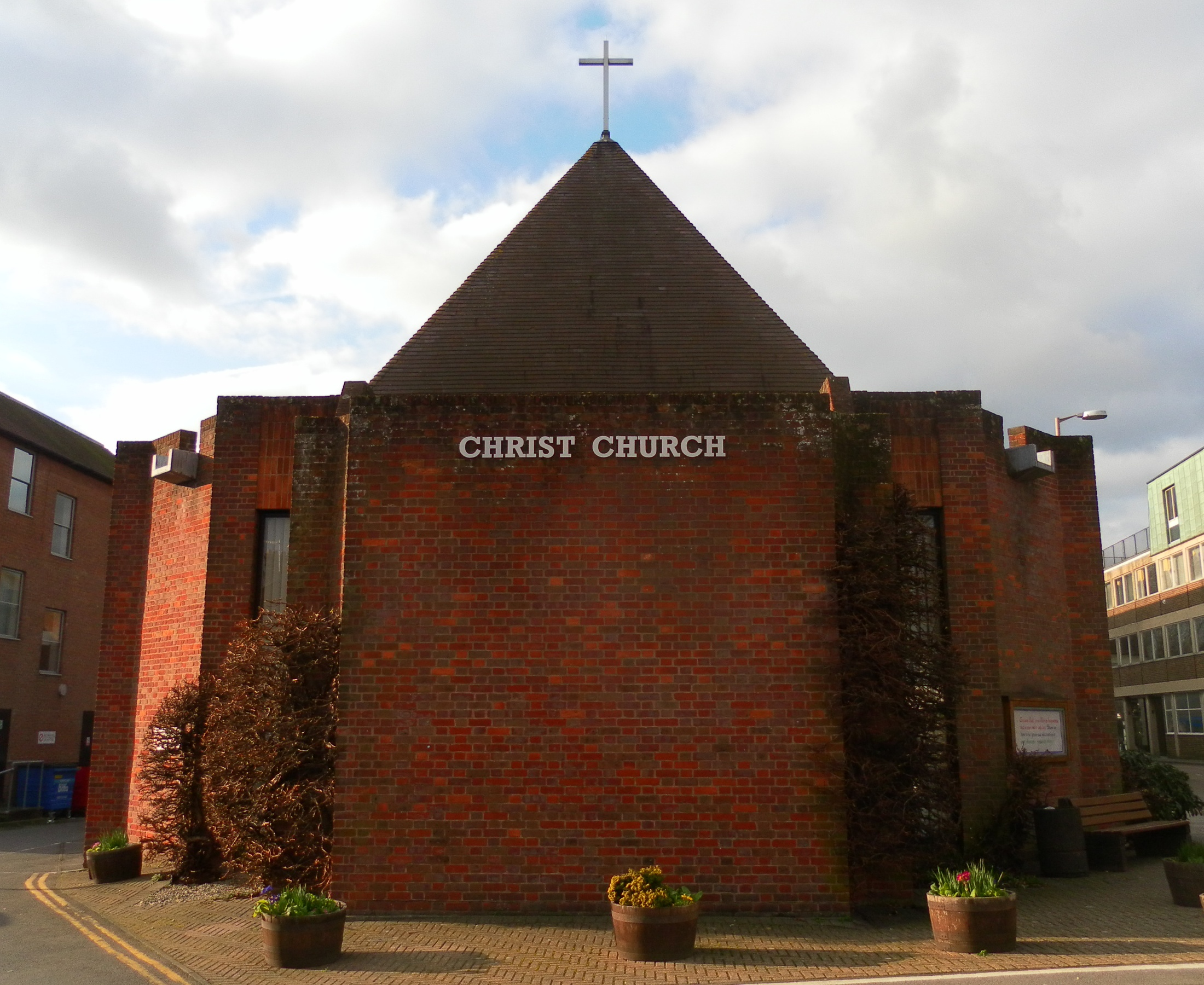
The United Reformed and Methodist churches share the modern Christ Church in Chichester city centre.

Roman Catholicism was historically stronger in West Sussex than in East Sussex, supported by wealthy landowners such as the Biddulph family of Duncton (who maintained a Mass Centre at their house, Burton Park, from the 17th century) and Charles Willcock Dawes of Petworth, who left £15,000 (£1,730,000 in 2025 pounds)) for a church to be built there in his memory in 1896. Chichester had one by 1855 and Midhurst by 1869; both have been replaced by large postwar buildings of bold modern design. St Richard of Chichester's Church in Chichester city controls two churches in nearby Bosham and East Wittering.

In contrast, Protestant Nonconformism in its various forms has fewer adherents than are found in the east of the county, and many Methodist, Baptist and other chapels have been closed. The sale of several chapels in Chichester city enabled Methodists and United Reformed Church adherents to join forces and open a small red-brick church together in 1982; and Baptist worship in the city has a continuous history going back more than 300 years, now maintained in a postwar building in the suburbs. Strict Baptists, whose chapels are much more prevalent in East Sussex, have a 200-year-old place of worship in the city, and the present Baptist church at Westbourne is the successor to an old chapel serving that sect.

The reuse of old chapels by new congregations is common: former Congregational chapels at East Dean and Kirdford are now in use by Evangelical groups, as is the 18th-century Zoar Strict Baptist Chapel at Wisborough Green and the former Society of Dependants' (Cokelers') meeting room in Loxwood, the historic centre of that tiny sect. The former chapel of Graylingwell Hospital in Chichester stood empty until 2010, when a newly formed Anglican church moved in. At Chithurst, an old mansion was converted into the Cittaviveka Buddhist Monastery.

== Religious affiliation ==
According to the 2021 United Kingdom census, 124,068 people lived in Chichester district. Of these, 53.12% identified themselves as Christian, 0.55% were Muslim, 0.49% were Buddhist, 0.25% were Hindu, 0.18% were Jewish, 0.03% were Sikh, 0.54% followed another religion, 38.67% claimed no religious affiliation and 6.16% did not state their religion. The proportions of Christians, Buddhists and people who followed no religion were higher than the figures in England as a whole (46.32%, 0.46% and 36.67% respectively). Islam, Judaism, Hinduism and Sikhism had a lower following in the district than in the country overall: in 2021, 6.73% of people in England were Muslim, 1.81% were Hindu, 0.92% were Sikh, 0.48% were Jewish and 0.46% were Buddhist.

== Administration ==
=== Anglican churches ===
All Anglican churches in the district are part of the Diocese of Chichester, whose cathedral is in Chichester city. Three Archdeaconries make up the next highest level of administration; churches in Chichester district are in either the Chichester Archdeaconry or the Horsham Archdeaconry.

The Chichester archdeaconry is divided into five rural deaneries. The church at Eartham is in the Arundel and Bognor Deanery; those at Apuldram, Birdham, Boxgrove, Donnington, Earnley, East Lavant, East Wittering, Fishbourne, Hunston, Mid Lavant, North Mundham, Oving, Selsey, Sidlesham, Tangmere, West Itchenor, West Wittering and Westhampnett are in the Chichester Deanery. The four churches in Chichester city—St George's, St Pancras', St Paul's and St Wilfrid's—are also in this deanery, but the Cathedral is part of its own extra-parochial area.

Horsham archdeaconry has eight rural deaneries. Bepton, Camelsdale, Chithurst, Cocking, Didling, Easebourne, Elsted, Fernhurst, Hammer, Heyshott, Iping, Linch (Woodmansgreen), Linchmere, Lodsworth, Midhurst, Milland, Rogate, Selham, South Harting, Stedham, Terwick, Trotton and Woolbeding churches are part of the Midhurst Deanery. Petworth Deanery covers the churches at Barlavington, Bignor, Burton Park, Bury, Coates, Duncton, Ebernoe, Egdean, Fittleworth, Graffham, Kirdford, Lurgashall, Northchapel, Petworth, Plaistow, Stopham, Sutton, Tillington, Upwaltham, Wisborough Green and Woolavington. The two churches at Bosham (Holy Trinity and the St Nicholas' Church Hall at Broadbridge), and those at Chidham, Compton, East Dean, East Marden, Forestside, Funtington, North Marden, Nutbourne, Racton, Sennicotts, Singleton, Southbourne, Stansted, Stoughton, Up Marden, Westbourne, West Dean, West Stoke, West Thorney and Woodmancote, are covered by the Westbourne Deanery.

=== Roman Catholic churches ===
The Roman Catholic Diocese of Arundel and Brighton, whose cathedral is at Arundel, administers the District of Chichester's Roman Catholic churches. All seven—at Bosham, Chichester, Duncton, East Wittering, Midhurst, Petworth and Selsey—are in the Cathedral Deanery, one of 13 deaneries in the diocese. Selsey, Bosham and East Wittering churches are served by priests from Chichester, and Duncton's is served from Petworth.

=== Other denominations ===
The Southern Synod, one of 13 synods of the United Reformed Church in the United Kingdom, administers Chichester district's three United Reformed churches, at Chichester, East Wittering and Petworth. Since September 2007, they have also been part of the South West Sussex United Area—an ecumenical partnership with the Methodist Church. There are ten churches in this group: four United Reformed, five Methodist, and Christ Church at Chichester, which serves both denominations. Selsey Methodist Church is also in the United Area; the district's other Methodist church, at Midhurst, is part of the seven-church Petersfield, Liphook & Haslemere Circuit, one of 24 circuits in the Southampton District.

Chichester Baptist Church is administratively part of the West Sussex Network of the South Eastern Baptist Association. Westbourne Baptist Church, on the Hampshire border, comes under the Southern Counties Baptist Association.

The Tustin Memorial Chapel at Kirdford, East Dean Free Church, Milland Evangelical Church, Southbourne Free Church (Note: Milland's and Southbourne's churches are listed on Affinity's website under Hampshire because their addresses have Hampshire post towns (Liphook and Emsworth respectively).) and the East Beach Evangelical Church at Selsey are members of Affinity (formerly the British Evangelical Council), a network of conservative Evangelical congregations throughout Great Britain. 3 Counties Vineyard (formerly Three Counties Church) at Hammer is a member of the Vineyard Churches UK and Ireland body, which belongs to the Association of Vineyard Churches.

Harting Congregational Church is part of the Congregational Federation, an association of independent Congregational churches in Great Britain. The federation came into existence in 1972 when the Congregational Church in England and Wales merged with several other denominations to form the United Reformed Church. Certain congregations wanted to remain independent of this, and instead joined the Congregational Federation. As of January 2021, there were 235 churches in the Federation.

== Current places of worship ==
Current places of worship
Name	Image	Location	Denomination/ Affiliation	Grade	Notes	Refs
St Mary's Church		Apuldram (Note: The spelling Appledram is also used.); 50.8237°N 0.8066°W	Anglican	I	A flint and Caen stone building of the 13th century with few houses nearby, this harbourside church was once served from Bosham. Lacy Ridge added a "fussy" tiled bell-turret in 1877. Parts of the nave are 12th-century, and no chancel arch divides it from the chancel.	
St Mary's Church		Barlavington; 50.9357°N 0.6178°W	Anglican	I	This "humble" Early English Gothic church was slightly restored in 1874 but largely retains its 13th-century appearance. There are north and south aisles and a bellcote.	
St Mary's Church		Bepton; 50.9577°N 0.7838°W	Anglican	I	Work began in 1182 on this Norman church, whose broad, stubby tower appears misaligned. It was heavily buttressed in 1620. The churchyard has a mass grave for Black Death victims.	
Holy Cross Church		Bignor; 50.9231°N 0.6036°W	Anglican	I	G.E. Street's restoration of 1876–78 added little apart from new lancet windows and a bell-turret. Much 13th-century work survives inside, and the chancel arch is older.	
St James's Church		Birdham; 50.7966°N 0.8326°W	Anglican	I	G.M. Hills' "terrifyingly harsh" (to Pevsner) restoration of 1882 renewed the chancel but left its arch untouched; this is early-14th-century and has intricate mouldings. The ancient tower has a 14th-century bell. The walls are ragstone.	
Holy Trinity Church		Bosham; 50.8289°N 0.8594°W	Anglican	I	Celtic monk Dicul founded a church here in the 7th century, and the present building (shown on the Bayeux Tapestry, and possibly the burial place of King Canute's daughter) has 9th-century work. Rebuilding took place in the 13th century.	
Church of Our Lady of the Assumption		Bosham; 50.8328°N 0.8514°W	Roman Catholic	–	A secondhand timber church was bought and erected in 1952 on a site left by Catherine Preece, a villager. The present building, partly prefabricated, replaced it from 28 May 1970 and was extended in 2011–12. Its marriage registration dates from February 1981.	
Priory Church of St Mary and St Blaise		Boxgrove; 50.8599°N 0.7109°W	Anglican	I	This is the former church of Boxgrove Priory, founded from Normandy in 1117; it has been adapted as a parish church for the tiny village. The outline survives of a former nave, demolished in 1220. The "truly magnificent" 13th-century chancel approaches Chichester Cathedral's in importance according to Pevsner.	
St Nicholas' Church Hall		Broadbridge, Bosham; 50.8409°N 0.8429°W	Anglican	–	This postwar building is a chapel of ease to Holy Trinity Church at Bosham. It serves the residential area around the railway station and is also used for community and social activities.	
St Richard's Church		Burton Park; 50.9494°N 0.6240°W	Anglican	I	The church stands in isolation next to the Burton Park mansion, designed by Henry Bassett in 1831. It predates the house by centuries: much Norman work survives, although the building was renovated in 1636 at Archbishop William Juxon's request. Charles I's coat of arms adorn the interior.	
St John the Evangelist's Church		Bury; 50.9084°N 0.5555°W	Anglican	I	Occupying an elevated site next to the River Arun, this large church has a simple 12th-century tower with a tall spire. Otherwise, the building is mostly 13th-century and of the Transitional Norman/Early English Gothic style. Victorian restoration altered the chancel and added a vestry.	
St Paul's Church		Camelsdale; 51.0832°N 0.7348°W	Anglican	–	Camelsdale was in Fernhurst parish when its chapel of ease was founded in 1906. It was parished in 1938, and is now part of a joint parish with St Peter's Church in Linchmere.	
Brethren's Meeting Room		Camelsdale; 51.0831°N 0.7354°W	Brethren	–	Planning permission was granted in 2000 for the conversion of an empty house on School Road into a Brethren place of worship, and subsequently in 2010 for the replacement of this building with the purpose-built single-storey Gospel Hall which now occupies the site.	
Cathedral of the Holy Trinity		Chichester; 50.8362°N 0.7809°W	Anglican	I	The episcopal see moved here from Selsey in 1070, work began on the cathedral in 1091 under Ralph de Luffa, and the building was consecrated in 1184. Construction work was affected by fires in 1114 and 1187. Isle of Wight limestone and Caen stone are the main materials, and the style is Romanesque. The tall spire collapsed in 1861 but was rebuilt.	
St Pancras' Church		Chichester; 50.8365°N 0.7736°W	Anglican	II	The present church dates from 1751: a 13th-century predecessor serving Chichester's highly developed eastern quarter was wrecked during the English Civil War. William Ride's "demure" flint-built Gothic Revival structure was altered by G.M. Hills in 1868.	
St Paul's Church		Chichester; 50.8415°N 0.7796°W	Anglican	II	Growth in the northern quarter prompted the construction of a large Gothic Revival church to serve it in 1836. Joseph Butler's stone and galleted flint building had its unsafe tower cut down in 1953, and an extension was built in 1993.	
Immanuel Church		Chichester; 50.8510°N 0.7704°W	Anglican	–	Graylingwell Hospital was built in 1897, and a chapel was provided. It fell out of use in around 2000; but after a major housing development took place on the hospital site, a new Anglican church established itself there. Refurbishment of the chapel is planned.	
St George's Church		Chichester; 50.8329°N 0.7666°W	Anglican	–	This large Early English Gothic Revival red-brick church has six-bay aisles spanning the chancel and nave. J.E.K. and J.P. Cutts' design of 1901 has been called "honest and thoughtful" and "a good example" of a Victorian church.	
St Michael's Hall		Chichester; 50.8532°N 0.7758°W	Anglican	–	This small combined church and church hall in the Summersdale area of the city dates from 1931 and is used for some services by the Immanuel Church at Graylingwell Chapel. Its architect is unknown.	
St Wilfrid's Church		Chichester; 50.8406°N 0.7903°W	Anglican	–	This was originally the parish hall of the now closed St Bartholomew's Church. It was converted into the Parklands suburb's church in 1959, and was parished ten years later. John Wells-Thorpe extended it in 1973; a squat brick tower separate the original and new sections.	
Providence Chapel		Chichester; 50.8392°N 0.7807°W	Baptist	II	Calvinistic Independent worshippers and Strict Baptists have used this plain stone and brick chapel since 1809, when John Baxter founded it. It is unchanged inside, and incorporates a house for the minister.	
Chichester Baptist Church		Chichester; 50.8439°N 0.7879°W	Baptist	–	Eastgate Hall in the city centre, used for Baptist worship since 1671, was sold in 1954 and a new building was built to Brian Tyler's design in 1958 in the Parklands area. It is of painted brick.	
Grace Church		Chichester; 50.8342°N 0.7963°W	Evangelical	–	This building on the Terminus Road industrial estate was registered for worship as an Evangelical church linked to the Newfrontiers movement.	
Revelation Centre		Chichester; 50.8313°N 0.7583°W	Evangelical	–	Also based on one of Chichester's industrial estates, this building houses worshippers associated with the Revelation Church movement.	
Orchard Street Church		Chichester; 50.8385°N 0.7844°W	Assemblies of God	–	This was registered under the name Chichester Family Church for worship by the Assemblies of God Pentecostal denomination.	
First Church of Christ, Scientist		Chichester; 50.8354°N 0.7719°W	Christian Scientist	–	This small building on Whyke Lane near the city centre is used for worship, and is also the headquarters of the Chichester Christian Science Society.	
Church of Jesus Christ of Latter-day Saints		Chichester; 50.8267°N 0.7830°W	Latter-day Saints	–	This meetinghouse is administratively in the Chichester Ward, part of the Portsmouth Stake. Meetings take place on Sunday mornings. In 1977, rooms in North Pallant had been registered for worship and marriages for this denomination.	
Christ Church		Chichester; 50.8337°N 0.7793°W	Methodist/United Reformed Church	–	On South Street stood a Methodist church of 1876 and a Congregational (later United Reformed) church dating from 1892. They were demolished in 1981 and 1980 respectively, and a shared church was designed by Pantlin & Bradbury in 1982.	
Swanfield Chapel		Chichester; 50.8410°N 0.7645°W	Open Brethren	–	This modern chapel is on the Swanfield estate in the east of the city. It was registered for worship and marriages in October 1972 and replaced the former West Lane Gospel Hall in the city centre, which had been registered in December 1938.	
Friends Meeting House		Chichester; 50.8381°N 0.7752°W	Quaker	–	Quakers worshipped in Chichester from 1683, and this building opposite Priory Park dates from 1698 or 1700. It was completely rebuilt in 1967 in a Modernist style by builder Robert Heasman (a Quaker) to the design of John Welland. A graveyard stood next to it, and part of it remains.	
St Richard of Chichester's Church		Chichester; 50.8329°N 0.7771°W	Roman Catholic	II	An Early English Gothic Revival church of 1855 was replaced on a different site by the Tomei & Maxwell firm in 1958. The brown-brick concrete-framed building has a large campanile and "remarkable" dalle de verre stained glass by a French artist, Gabriel Loire. English Heritage listed the church in 2007.	
Chichester Christian Spiritualist Church		Chichester; 50.8327°N 0.7791°W	Spiritualist	–	This place of worship forms the ground floor of a converted house in Basin Road in Chichester city centre. Until 1986, part of a building in Southgate had been registered for the same purpose.	
St Mary's Church		Chidham; 50.8295°N 0.8826°W	Anglican	II*	An "assertive" bellcote was added during restoration work in 1864, but the church remains largely 13th-century. The church had a steeple until the 17th century. A north aisle was added in the 14th century.	
St Mary's Church		Chithurst; 51.0009°N 0.8007°W	Anglican	I	This tiny village has a "charming, plain" 11th-century church with a short chancel and nave topped with a modest bellcote. Closure was threatened but averted in 1956. The font is 12th-century.	
Cittaviveka Buddhist Monastery		Chithurst; 51.0003°N 0.8011°W	Theravada Buddhist	–	The Thai Forest Tradition of Buddhism is followed at this Buddhist place of worship in the isolated, well-wooded parish of Chithurst. It occupies a mansion called Chithurst House and was founded in 1979.	
St Agatha's Church		Coates; 50.9511°N 0.5814°W	Anglican	I	This small, isolated 12th-century church is surrounded by trees. It was reordered in the 13th century and again in 1907, but many Norman features remain, including a window in the south wall.	
St Catherine of Siena Church		Cocking; 50.9504°N 0.7492°W	Anglican	I	There are traces of 11th-century work in this two-cell church in the main-road village of Cocking, but the tower is three centuries later and "careful" restoration work in 1865 and 1896 made more changes. The low chancel arch is original.	
St Mary's Church		Compton; 50.9272°N 0.8947°W	Anglican	II*	Nothing remains of the Domesday-era church here; some internal features are 12th-century, such as the pointed chancel arch, and 13th-century additions are evident. The flint exterior was restored in 1849. There is a wooden bell-turret topped with a spire and containing two old bells.	
St Andrew's Church		Didling; 50.9565°N 0.8124°W	Anglican	I	In a "grand situation" well away from the tiny village stands this modest, unrestored 13th-century single-cell aisleless chapel with an end bellcote. The pews—more like crude benches—may be as old as the church itself, and oil-lamps and candles still light the interior.	
St George's Church		Donnington; 50.8132°N 0.7916°W	Anglican	I	The 13th-century church, augmented by a Victorian restoration, was gutted by fire in 1939; Frederick Etchells restored it to its former appearance. The plain battlemented tower, oddly placed at the southwest corner, is 16th-century.	
Holy Trinity Church		Duncton; 50.9492°N 0.6337°W	Anglican	II	An old church dedicated to St Mary was demolished in favour of this replacement. George Wyndham, 1st Baron Leconfield was involved in its construction, which took place in 1866. The stone Decorated Gothic Revival building has a spire-topped tower.	
St Anthony and St George's Church		Duncton; 50.9508°N 0.6311°W	Roman Catholic	II	Gilbert Blount designed this in a "fussily attractive" Early English Gothic Revival style for the Biddulph family, who funded it. It has an apsidal end and a prominent bellcote. The inside is galleried. Built in 1868 for £5,000, it is set in a walled graveyard. It was Grade II-listed in April 2015.	
Earnley Church		Earnley; 50.7663°N 0.8441°W	Anglican	II*	This 13th-century two-cell building is extremely plain inside and out; the only exterior detail is a bell-turret. The body of the chancel is mostly 14th-century. The nave lacks aisles.	
St Margaret's Church		Eartham; 50.8761°N 0.6673°W	Anglican	I	Pevsner condemned the restoration work of 1869, which transformed the exterior, as "terrible". Much Norman work remains inside, though: for example, the nave is almost completely 12th-century, and the chancel arch (with carvings including a rabbit) may be older still.	
St Mary's Church		Easebourne; 50.9952°N 0.7260°W	Anglican	I	Arthur Blomfield restored and altered the church, which was originally used by nuns from neighbouring Easebourne Priory, in 1876. The simple tower is 12th-century and retains its original form. Herringbone masonry in the nave wall is a century older.	
All Saints Church		East Dean; 50.9112°N 0.7137°W	Anglican	I	A Saxon church probably existed on this prominent hilltop site, but the present cruciform building, with its prominent battlemented square tower, is mostly 12th-century. The large church was modernised and altered in 1870. The font is original.	
East Dean Free Church		East Dean; 50.9085°N 0.7162°W	Evangelical	–	Congregational worship here began in a house in 1872, and in 1904 this Early English Gothic Revival style stuccoed roughcast chapel was provided. In 1967, it became an Evangelical chapel aligned with the FIEC.	
St Mary's Church		East Lavant; 50.8695°N 0.7765°W	Anglican	I	G.M. Hills' heavy restoration of 1863 did not obscure all the original 12th-century work. There is a long north aisle with a vestry attached, and a second vestry adjoins the stark brick-built tower of 1671. One 13th-century lancet window survives.	
St Peter's Church		East Marden; 50.9255°N 0.8526°W	Anglican	I	This single-cell stone building has a Victorian vestry on one side, a 17th-century porch on the other and a great deal of 13th-century work. The layout may be a century older, as at nearby North Marden.	
St Anne's Church		East Wittering; 50.7695°N 0.8701°W	Anglican	–	Harry Sherwood designed this red-brick church with a partly timbered tower in 1958. Its simple design is augmented by a transept and dormer windows. John Skelton provided a sculpted crucifix.	
St Peter's Church		East Wittering; 50.7712°N 0.8693°W	Roman Catholic	–	Built in 1938, extended later and moved from the parish of Chichester into Selsey, this brick-built church with a prominent gabled porch now has its own parish. Gabriel Loire provided dalle de verre stained glass in 1963. The altar is of Italian travertine.	
Oakfield Avenue Chapel		East Wittering; 50.7673°N 0.8691°W	United Reformed Church	–	A timber church was built in the 1960s in the village centre. By 2003, permission was granted for a replacement, and in 2007–08 a timber-framed replacement was erected from a kit. The rebuilding project cost £320,000.	
Holy Trinity Church		Ebernoe; 51.0415°N 0.6099°W	Anglican	II	M.E. Habershon and E.P.L. Brock designed a "tiny box-of-bricks chapel" in 1865–68 for this isolated hamlet in the Weald. Red and yellow brick, stone and some intricate timberwork (to the porch) are the main materials.	
St Bartholomew's Church		Egdean; 50.9717°N 0.5821°W	Anglican	II*	There are few 17th-century churches in Sussex; this was built in 1622 to replace an ancient ruined chapel. Brick began to be used as a building material at this time, and much is used here, outside and in. Some Victorian restoration took place.	
St Paul's Church		Elsted; 50.9717°N 0.8391°W	Anglican	II*	J.E.M. Macgregor restored this ancient church in 1951 under the guidance of SPAB. It had declined to near-dereliction, especially after a tree crushed the nave in 1893. This part of the church was 11th-century and consisted mostly of herringbone masonry.	
St Margaret of Antioch's Church		Fernhurst; 51.0489°N 0.7190°W	Anglican	II	Henry Woodyer added an aisle in 1859 to the 12th-century church, and Anthony Salvin (late in his career) undertook a thorough renovation 22 years later. Some ancient windows remain in the Early English Gothic building.	
Brethren Meeting Room		Fernhurst; 51.0509°N 0.7185°W	Exclusive Brethren	–	Exclusive Brethren worshipped at a chapel in Chapel Street in Fernhurst village, which was in use from before 1958 until the cancellation of its registration as a place of worship in 1989. It was succeeded by this meeting room on a new site in Old Glebe, which was registered for marriages in August 1994.	
St Peter and St Mary's Church		Fishbourne; 50.8336°N 0.8052°W	Anglican	II	There were two 19th-century restorations at this medieval Early English Gothic church, both of which retained the main features of its chancel. George Draper added a porch and other elements in 1821, and another architect rebuilt the aisle and nave in 1847.	
St Mary's Church		Fittleworth; 50.9642°N 0.5642°W	Anglican	I	The present nave (by Henry Woodyer) dates from 1871; its predecessor was structurally unsound. The chancel and broach spire-topped tower which flank it are original, though—they are of 13th-century Early English Gothic design.	
Fittleworth Evangelical Free Church		Fittleworth; 50.9620°N 0.5617°W	Evangelical	–	This was founded as a Baptist chapel in 1904 by a Worthing-based pastor. It later passed into the ownership of a Fellowship of Independent Evangelical Churches-affiliated congregation.	
Christ Church		Forestside; 50.9050°N 0.9254°W	Anglican	–	Attributed to Samuel Sanders Teulon and dating from 1856, this remote chapel north of Stansted Park has a bellcote, a distinctive large east-end lancet window and high-quality stained glass. The flint and stone building is Early English Gothic Revival.	
St Mary's Church		Funtington; 50.8674°N 0.8635°W	Anglican	II*	The present appearance dates from a drastic restoration of 1859, attributed to Samuel Sanders Teulon, but the core is 13th-century with a 14th-century side chapel and a castellated 15th-century tower.	
All Saints Chapel		Graffham; 50.9528°N 0.6768°W	Anglican	–	Situated in the village centre, this is a chapel of ease to St Giles' parish church. There are Sunday evening services three times a month.	
St Giles' Church		Graffham; 50.9428°N 0.6795°W	Anglican	II	Bishop Samuel Wilberforce was commemorated by G.E. Street's complete rebuilding of this village church, which took place over a 13-year period from 1874. Some Early English Gothic-style 12th- and 13th-century work survives, such as the arcades to the nave.	
3 Counties Vineyard		Hammer; 51.0824°N 0.7519°W	Vineyard Churches	–	John Grover designed this chapel in 1903 for Independent Congregational worshippers; he built another two just across the Surrey border. It is of red brick and has a hall underneath. The Milland Evangelical Church opened a church plant in the building in 1966. Until September 2021 it was an independent Evangelical church named Three Counties Church; at that time the name was changed and the congregation became affiliated with the Vineyard Churches UK and Ireland body.	
New Life Christian Church		Hermitage, Southbourne; 50.8424°N 0.9268°W	Evangelical	–	This was registered for worship by an Evangelical body with the name Emsworth Christian Church.	
St James's Church		Heyshott; 50.9556°N 0.7239°W	Anglican	II*	Villager Richard Cobden worshipped here and is commemorated by a plaque inside. The 13th-century structure and 19th-century alterations are set off by a "surprisingly elaborate Perpendicular south window" which reminded Nikolaus Pevsner of those in East Anglian churches.	
St Leodegar's Church		Hunston; 50.8065°N 0.7742°W	Anglican	–	The ancient church in this marshland village collapsed by the 19th century, so Arthur Blomfield was commissioned to build another. The stone-built Gothic Revival church was finished in 1885. It has a prominent double bellcote.	
St Mary's Church		Iping; 50.9999°N 0.7867°W	Anglican	II	The medieval church had a nave and chancel. Thomas Greenshields rebuilt it in 1840 with a prominent tower, but E.P.L. Brock completely overhauled it again in 1885–86 in the Early English/Decorated Gothic Revival style using sandstone.	
St John the Baptist's Church		Kirdford; 51.0288°N 0.5494°W	Anglican	I	The parish that for centuries was West Sussex's largest had this 12th-century Bargate and Horsham Stone church at its heart. Many fittings were made from locally quarried Sussex Marble—an important industry in Kirdford. The church was extended in the 13th and 15th centuries, when the tall tower was added.	
Tustin Memorial Chapel		Kirdford; 51.0349°N 0.5554°W	Evangelical	–	This 1892 chapel was originally Congregational and later United Reformed. The name commemorates Jesse J. Tustin, and the present red-brick building (also known simply as Kirdford Chapel) replaced one of 1816.	
St Peter's Church		Linchmere (Note: The spelling Lynchmere is also used.); 51.0709°N 0.7600°W	Anglican	II*	The elevated position at the boundary of three counties gives views across Surrey, Hampshire and West Sussex from this 12th-century building's churchyard. There is no chancel arch inside, and the sandstone building has a small tower and porches to both sides. It was rebuilt in 1856.	
St Peter's Church		Lodsworth; 50.9968°N 0.6747°W	Anglican	II*	The nave and chancel may date from the 11th century. A tower was added in the 14th century, and Victorian restoration altered the building in a neo-Norman and Gothic Revival fashion. Transepts and aisles were also added. Sandstone is the main material.	
St John the Baptist's Church		Loxwood; 51.0689°N 0.5158°W	Anglican	–	Designed by Rowland Plumbe in 1898–1900 and criticised as "horribly fiddly" by Pevsner, this red-brick Perpendicular Gothic Revival church has a castellated tower with a spire and stair-turret. There is a single aisle.	
Emmanuel Fellowship Chapel		Loxwood; 51.0770°N 0.5153°W	Evangelical	–	Loxwood was the centre of John Sirgood's Society of Dependants denomination. It died out by the 1980s, and this former Society chapel was taken over by an Evangelical group and re-registered for marriages in December 1986. It retains its graveyard and entrance porch, and dates from about 1862.	
St Laurence's Church		Lurgashall; 51.0373°N 0.6634°W	Anglican	II*	The mostly 13th-century structure of this church, in the centre of its "picture-postcard village", contains some older Norman work. The tower, unusually at the southeast end, is 14th-century; a wooden spire was added later, but was removed in the 1950s and subsequently replaced with a shingled one. The chancel is dated 1731. The timber lean-to aisle attached to the nave is 16th-century and was originally a school.	
St Nicholas' Church		Mid Lavant; 50.8708°N 0.7859°W	Anglican	II	Much of the fabric of Mid Lavant's church dates from the Victorian era, but the chancel is 13th-century and traces remain of an older building. The bell-turret has a small spire.	
St Mary Magdalene and St Denys' Church		Midhurst; 50.9859°N 0.7375°W	Anglican	II*	Frequent alterations throughout its history give this large town church a mixed appearance; the latest, by Lacy Ridge in 1882, was substantial. There are chapels on two sides and a bulky tower.	
Kingdom Hall		Midhurst; 50.9810°N 0.7476°W	Jehovah's; Witnesses	–	This was built on Holmbush Way in Midhurst and was licensed for worship by the Midhurst Congregation of Jehovah's Witnesses. A certification for the solemnisation of marriages was granted in January 1990.	
Midhurst Methodist Church		Midhurst; 50.9898°N 0.7376°W	Methodist	–	Josiah Gunton's Free-style Decorated Gothic Revival church of 1904 combines flint, brick and stonework. Turrets remain at the ends of the façade, which rises to a curved gable end, but a flèche was taken off in 1955. There is a hammerbeam roof inside.	
Church of the Divine Motherhood and St Francis of Assisi		Midhurst; 50.9837°N 0.7422°W	Roman Catholic	II	Listed in 2011 for its successful and distinctive interpretation of Vatican II's liturgical changes and its "striking Modernist composition", Guy Morgan's fan-shaped church of 1957–65 has a campanile.	
St Luke's Church		Milland; 51.0477°N 0.8244°W	Anglican	II	Criticised by Pevsner for its Victorian style, this church opened in 1878 to replace the derelict adjacent Tuxlith Chapel (the village was formerly called Tuxlith). The nave has aisles on both sides, and there is a tower.	
Milland Evangelical Church		Milland; 51.0322°N 0.8014°W	Evangelical	–	This chapel was founded as Milland Mission Hall in 1909 by a Mr Dexter. It supported a Sunday school, and a church hall was added in the 1970s. The Three Counties Church at Hammer was founded by a former pastor.	
St Mary's Church		North Marden; 50.9390°N 0.8526°W	Anglican	I	This one-room building has a rare apsidal chancel (one of either three or four unaltered examples in England) attached to a longer nave. All of this dates from about 1130, as does one window; a south porch and north vestry were built in the Victorian era.	
St Stephen's Church		North Mundham; 50.8122°N 0.7602°W	Anglican	II*	The long 13th-century nave has a much shorter, vestry-flanked chancel of 1883 at one end and a mid-16th-century tower at the other. Arthur Blomfield was responsible for the restoration.	
St Michael's Church		Northchapel; 51.0561°N 0.6428°W	Anglican	II	The original church apparently dates from about 1820, and the stone-built tower survives, but the present building is attributable to Anthony Salvin's reconstruction of 1877. It is in the Early English Gothic Revival style. The Sussex Marble font is 17th-century.	
St Wilfrid's Church		Nutbourne; 50.8439°N 0.8820°W	Anglican	–	This low, brown-brick and timber combined church and hall was built near Nutbourne railway station to replace a mission hall with the same dedication which had stood in nearby Hambrook village since 1923. It is served from Chidham parish church.	
St Andrew's Church		Oving; 50.8379°N 0.7220°W	Anglican	II	The 13th-century flint church, heavily altered in 1840 and 1881, was the successor to an older building whose fragmentary remains were discovered during the second round of restorations. The cruciform church has a slightly angled tower with a broach spire.	
St Mary's Church		Petworth; 50.9879°N 0.6097°W	Anglican	I	Architecturally an "exasperating puzzle" to Pevsner, regular rebuildings and additions (by Charles Barry, Seely & Paget and others) have hidden its 13th-century origins. The chancel retains some work of this era, though.	
Church of the Sacred Heart		Petworth; 50.9861°N 0.6065°W	Roman Catholic	II	Scottish architect Frederick Walters' Decorated Gothic Revival church was funded by C.W. Dawes, who is buried inside. His £15,000 paid for a lavish stone building with an apse, spire-topped tower, turrets, internal carving and Lavers, Barraud and Westlake stained glass.	
Petworth United Reformed Church		Petworth; 50.9859°N 0.6100°W	United Reformed Church	II	This rubble and tile church on a central square in Petworth dates from 1850 and was extended in 1889. The Gothic Revival building is topped with a wooden turret and spire. It replaced an older Congregational chapel.	
Holy Trinity Church		Plaistow; 51.0695°N 0.5676°W	Anglican	–	Joseph Butler designed a "decent" stone-built Gothic Revival chapel for this outlying village in Kirdford parish in 1851. There are lancet windows throughout, a half-timbered clock tower and an entrance porch.	
Kingdom Hall		Portfield, Chichester; 50.8377°N 0.7528°W	Jehovah's; Witnesses	–	This building on the road to Oving was registered for worship for the Chichester, North and Chichester, South Congregations of Jehovah's Witnesses in the Chichester city area. They used rooms in East Street and North Street in the mid-1950s.	
St Peter's Church		Racton; 50.8772°N 0.8929°W	Anglican	I	The church had no dedication until the late 20th century. A simple two-cell building topped with a bellcote, it retains its 12th-century nave and 13th-century chancel, which has a 16th-century table tomb attached to its north wall.	
St Bartholomew's Church		Rogate; 51.0079°N 0.8502°W	Anglican	I	A large sandstone building with parts dating from the 12th to 15th centuries inclusive, this centrally placed church has a vestry-flanked and broach spire-topped tower, two aisles (the north one with an entrance porch attached), a short chancel flanked by two chapels, and heavy buttressing in several places. John Penfold restored it in 1875.	
St James's Church		Selham; 50.9780°N 0.6727°W	Anglican	I	The nave and smaller, narrower chancel are 11th-century, and a south chapel dates from the 14th century. A former tower no longer exists, and the only addition has been a Victorian porch—although the south chapel was restored then as well.	
St Peter's Church		Selsey; 50.7368°N 0.7884°W	Anglican	II	Selsey's ancient parish church, St Wilfrid's, had its nave dismantled and rebuilt in the village centre in 1865–66. A font of c. 1100 was also moved in. James Piers St Aubyn designed the building.	
East Beach Evangelical Church		Selsey; 50.7352°N 0.7771°W	Evangelical	–	An Evangelical congregation has been based in Selsey since the 1960s. They moved into their present building in 1976, and it was registered for marriages in September 1979. The church is aligned to the FIEC.	
Selsey Methodist Church		Selsey; 50.7346°N 0.7904°W	Methodist	II	This was built for Bible Christians in 1867, possibly to a design by George Draper. Gault brick, cobblestone and knapped flint walls rise to a gable at the front. A flint and stone front porch was added later.	
Church of Our Lady of Mount Carmel and St Wilfrid		Selsey; 50.7361°N 0.7860°W	Roman Catholic	–	Reconstituted stone is the main building material of this 1961 Roman Catholic church, whose architect is not recorded. The nave and sanctuary are undivided and have a clerestory and aisles. There is also a corner tower and some modern stained glass.	
St Mary's Church		Sennicotts; 50.8577°N 0.8167°W	Anglican	II	Also described as St Mary's Chapel, this was designed and built by George Draper in 1829 for Charles Baker, a resident of Sennicotts in Funtington parish, who had disagreements with the incumbent at Funtington and wished to worship in his own chapel. It later passed out of his family and was opened for public worship as a chapel of ease. Behind the battlemented tower is a plain chancel and nave, all built of flint and stone.	
St Mary's Church		Sidlesham; 50.7844°N 0.7875°W	Anglican	I	A "barnlike" stone church in a harbourside location, this has a 16th-century tower and was greatly restored in the 17th century. It is t-shaped due to the removal at that time of the chancel.	
Church of the Blessed Virgin Mary		Singleton; 50.9101°N 0.7525°W	Anglican	I	An important Saxon centre, Singleton had a large church at that time, and some work survives from that era-such as the very tall nave walls. The appearance is mostly Early English Gothic, though; much work is 15th-century.	
St Mary and St Gabriel's Church		South Harting; 50.9688°N 0.8846°W	Anglican	I	This large parish has a big, prominently sited church—the largest for miles around. The oldest parts are early-14th-century; there is an aisled nave, chancel, ruined side chapel, vestry and two transepts, giving a cruciform shape. The green copper spire is a landmark.	
Harting Congregational Church		South Harting; 50.9704°N 0.8833°W	Congregational Federation	–	Built by Portsmouth-based G. Jenkins in 1871, possibly as a replacement chapel for an existing congregation, this "minimal Gothic Revival" brick and stone building has a small spire on its gable.	
St John the Evangelist's Church		Southbourne; 50.8454°N 0.9084°W	Anglican	–	Southbourne was in Westbourne parish until 1878. T. Chatfield Clark's Early English Gothic Revival church, with a corner tower, a tall spire and transepts, was completed two years earlier. It was built entirely of stone.	
Southbourne Free Church		Southbourne; 50.8469°N 0.9109°W	Free church	–	This nondenominational place of worship maintains links with the Affinity and FIEC Evangelical organisations.	
St Paul's Church		Stansted Park; 50.8861°N 0.9210°W	Anglican	I	This was converted from the ruins of a late-15th-century house by Lewis Way in 1815–18, giving it a "disarming" appearance. Harry Stuart Goodhart-Rendel restored it in 1926 and again after wartime damage. There are high-quality wooden fittings and stained glass.	
St James's Church		Stedham; 50.9963°N 0.7704°W	Anglican	II	Joseph Butler replaced the mid-11th-century church in this village with a new Gothic Revival building in 1850. The tower dates from 1673, though, and has bells of various ages and a vestry at the bottom stage. The font may be 12th-century. All windows are lancets.	
St Mary the Virgin's Church		Stopham; 50.9607°N 0.5397°W	Anglican	I	Started immediately after the Norman conquest, this tall church largely retains its 11th-century appearance. The tower is 17th-century; few were built at this time in Sussex. A former anchorite cell has disappeared.	
St Mary's Church		Stoughton; 50.8980°N 0.8624°W	Anglican	I	A simple exterior conceals an unrestored 11th-century interior with some Saxon elements. The stubby tower was originally a transept, but gained its present form in the 14th century. The door is set in a 17th-century brick porch.	
St John the Baptist's Church		Sutton; 50.9311°N 0.6085°W	Anglican	I	The 11th-century church has grown over the centuries: the nave was added to in the 12th century, when an aisle was built, the tower was built a century later, and the chancel (with its single transept) is 50 years newer. The tower has a pyramidal spire and narrow windows.	
St Andrew's Church		Tangmere; 50.8480°N 0.7207°W	Anglican	I	The 12th-century two-cell church has a bell-turret which is supported internally on a sturdy, strongly braced timber frame. The chancel is slightly later than the nave and has wide windows. The south porch is much newer. There are many wartime graves: RAF Tangmere is adjacent.	
St Peter's Church		Terwick; 51.0052°N 0.8357°W	Anglican	II*	The nave and chancel are wholly 12th-century at this tiny unrestored church in an isolated location near Rogate. An entrance porch flanked by two rooms was added in the 19th century, though. The rubble and tile church had herringbone masonry at one stage.	
All Hallows Church		Tillington; 50.9893°N 0.6292°W	Anglican	I	The "improbable" south-side tower, capped with a crown-shaped element and built in 1807 intentionally as a landmark, was added to a medieval church of mostly 13th-century origin. The present appearance is attributable to the 1807 restoration, though. The nave has two aisles, and there is a vestry and a tall porch.	
St George's Church		Trotton; 50.9959°N 0.8097°W	Anglican	I	The plain tower dates from 1230, and the rest of the church is early-14th-century. Extensive wall paintings were uncovered in 1904, and a 9-foot (2.7 m) brass memorial in the chancel commemorates Thomas de Camoys, 1st Baron Camoys (d. 1421). There is no chancel arch; a step separates the nave and chancel.	
St Michael's Church		Up Marden; 50.9210°N 0.8700°W	Anglican	I	On a high, remote site, this church is almost unchanged since it was erected in the 13th century: the simple two-cell layout and narrow windows had a tower added at the west end in the 14th century, and the chancel arch was replaced in the 16th century because its predecessor was collapsing.	
St Mary the Virgin's Church		Upwaltham; 50.9165°N 0.6598°W	Anglican	I	The long nave and short, apsidal chancel are 12th-century and have had no restoration; a 13th-century chancel arch separates them. The king post roof may be original as well. An intricately carved piscina adds "a tiny touch of richness".	
St Andrew's Church		West Dean; 50.9066°N 0.7761°W	Anglican	II*	Richard Lewknor MP is commemorated in this 11th- and 13th-century church, whose present appearance dates from 1934 due to restoration after fire damage. The Lewknor memorial is Classical in style and has three effigies. The long nave has a tower at the west end.	
St Nicholas' Church		West Itchenor; 50.7998°N 0.8665°W	Anglican	I	This single-cell flint church next to Chichester Harbour has a spire-topped shingle-clad bell-turret at one end. Victorian restoration affected the overall appearance; a new roof and porch were also added.	
St Andrew's Church		West Stoke; 50.8722°N 0.8268°W	Anglican	I	West Stoke manor house is adjacent to this 11th-century church, whose nave dates from that era. The narrower chancel is 13th-century Early English Gothic, and the chancel arch was altered in the Victorian era. The medieval detail is simple and not ornate.	
St Nicholas' Church		West Thorney; 50.8166°N 0.9085°W	Anglican	I	Lying at the end of the Thorney Island peninsula beyond an RAF Coastal Command airfield, this 12th- and 13th-century church (possibly originally a single-cell building) is very isolated but remains open. There were once two aisles, but both have been demolished.	
St Peter and St Paul's Church		West Wittering; 50.7800°N 0.8993°W	Anglican	I	The 12th-century nave and slightly later south aisle (separated by a four-bay arcade) lead into a large Lady chapel (contemporary with the aisle) and a short 13th-century chancel. William White restored the church in 1875.	
St John the Baptist's Church		Westbourne; 50.8604°N 0.9278°W	Anglican	I	Perpendicular Gothic churches are rare in Sussex, and this is a large example serving an extensive parish. The vicar was responsible for what Pevsner called a "really unpleasant" restoration in 1865, but late-14th-century work is still visible outside. The tower was altered in the 16th century.	
Westbourne Baptist Church		Westbourne; 50.8641°N 0.9252°W	Baptist	–	There were two chapels for Baptists of various descriptions (Calvinistic Independents and Particular Baptists) in 19th-century Westbourne. The present church building stands on North Street.	
St Peter's Church		Westhampnett; 50.8484°N 0.7501°W	Anglican	II*	Victorian restoration in 1867 consisted of extending the south aisle's arcade, replacing the chancel arch, adding a second aisle. Some Saxon work remains in the chancel, but this part of the church is mostly 13th-century. Three former Bishops of Chichester are buried here.	
St Peter ad Vincula Church		Wisborough Green; 51.0224°N 0.5016°W	Anglican	I	William Butterfield's restoration of 1867 conceals an older structure with many additions: the nave dates from the 11th and 12th centuries (the west end is the oldest part), the chancel was added in the 13th century, the north aisle is contemporary, one was added on the south side a century later and the entrance porches are 15th-century. The long church has a spire-topped tower.	
Zoar Chapel		Wisborough Green; 51.0226°N 0.5075°W	Evangelical	II	A Calvinistic Independent chapel was founded in 1753. The present building—a simple arched-windowed brick chapel half-hidden behind a house, like the Bethel Chapel at Robertsbridge—dates from 1820. The old galleried interior survives.	
Woodmancote Mission Church		Woodmancote; 50.8623°N 0.8999°W	Anglican	–	The hamlet of Woodmancote in Westbourne parish is served by this "modest chapelry"—a rare prefabricated green-painted tin tabernacle with an entrance porch. It was erected in 1892 and licensed in 1928.	
St Luke's Church		Woodmansgreen, Linch; 51.0406°N 0.7720°W	Anglican	II	The parish had two churches, both of which were ruined by the 18th century. That near Linch Farm no longer exists, but St Luke's Chapel at Woodmansgreen was rebuilt in 1700 and extended and greatly altered in 1886 by Lacy Ridge. The south door is original, and 15th-century stained glass was installed from another church.	
All Hallows Church		Woolbeding; 50.9968°N 0.7573°W	Anglican	I	This church is almost within the grounds of Woolbeding manor house. Its heavily buttressed tower (erected in 1728) has a side entrance porch; beyond is a mostly 11th-century nave. The chancel was rebuilt and lengthened in 1870 for Edward Howard, 1st Baron Lanerton, and a vestry was attached.	

== See also ==
- Grade I listed buildings in West Sussex
- List of former places of worship in Chichester (district)

== Bibliography ==
- Beevers, David; Marks, Richard; Roles, John (1989). Sussex Churches and Chapels. Brighton: The Royal Pavilion, Art Gallery and Museums. ISBN 0-948723-11-4.
- Chambers, Ralph (1953). The Strict Baptist Chapels of England: Sussex. Vol. 2. Thornton Heath: Ralph Chambers.
- Coppin, Paul (2006). 101 Medieval Churches of West Sussex. Seaford: S.B. Publications. ISBN 1-85770-306-5.
- Elleray, D. Robert (2004). Sussex Places of Worship. Worthing: Optimus Books. ISBN 0-9533132-7-1.
- Homan, Roger (1997). "Mission and Fission: the organization of Huntingtonian and Calvinistic Baptist causes in Sussex in the 18th and 19th centuries". Sussex Archaeological Collections. 135. Lewes: Sussex Archaeological Society: 265–282. doi:10.5284/1085045. ISSN 0143-8204.
- Lines, Wendy (2002). Billingshurst and Wisborough Green. Images of England. Stroud: Tempus Publishing. ISBN 0-7524-2482-3.
- Morgan, Roy R. (1992). Chichester: A Documentary History. Chichester: Phillimore & Co. Ltd. ISBN 0-85033-851-4.
- Nairn, Ian; Pevsner, Nikolaus (1965). The Buildings of England: Sussex. Harmondsworth: Penguin Books. ISBN 0-14-071028-0.
- Stell, Christopher (2002). Nonconformist Chapels and Meeting-houses in Eastern England. Swindon: English Heritage. ISBN 1-873592-50-7.
- Swinfen, Warden; Arscott, David (1984). Hidden Sussex. Brighton: BBC Radio Sussex. ISBN 0-9509510-0-5.
- Vigar, John (1986). Exploring Sussex Churches. Rainham: Meresborough Books. ISBN 0-948193-09-3.
- Wales, Tony (1999). The West Sussex Village Book. Newbury: Countryside Books. ISBN 1-85306-581-1.
