= Gerard Edwards Smith =

English cleric and botanist

Gerard Edwards Smith (1804–1881) was a Church of England cleric and botanist.

== Life ==
Born at Camberwell, Surrey, he was sixth son of Henry Smith. He entered Merchant Taylors' School in January 1814, and St. John's College, Oxford, as Andrew's exhibitioner, in 1822; he graduated B.A. in 1829. He was ordained that year, and became a curate at Sellinge; and then at Stoughton, West Sussex and East Marden in 1833.

Smith was vicar of St. Peter-the-Less, Chichester, from 1835 to 1836; rector of North Marden, Sussex, from 1836 to 1843; vicar of Cantley, near Doncaster, Yorkshire, from 1844 to 1846, and perpetual curate of Ashton Hayes, Cheshire, from 1849 to 1853. He was vicar of Osmaston-by-Ashbourne, Derbyshire, from 1854 to 1871. He died at Ockbrook, near Derby, on 21 December 1881, and his herbarium was preserved at University College, Nottingham.

== Works ==
Before being ordained Smith published his major botanical work, A Catalogue of rare or remarkable Phanogamous Plants collected in South Kent, London, 1829, which is dated from Sandgate. The Catalogue, of 76 pages, is arranged by the Linnæan system, deals critically with several groups, and had coloured plates drawn by the author.

Smith was the first to recognise several British plants, describing Statice occidentalis under the name S. binervosa in the Supplement to English Botany (1831, p. 63), and Filago apiculata in The Phytologist for 1846 (p. 575). He contributed Remarks on Ophrys to John Claudius Loudon's Magazine of Natural History in 1828 (i. 398); On the Claims of Alyssum calycinum to a place in the British Flora to The Phytologist for 1845 (ii. 232); a preface to W. E. Howe's Ferns of Derbyshire in 1861, enlarged in the edition of 1877; and Notes on the Flora of Derbyshire to the Journal of Botany, British and Foreign for 1881. Other works were:

- Stonehenge, a poem, Oxford, 1823, signed "Sir Oracle, Ox. Coll.", humorous.
- Are the Teachings of Modern Science antagonistic to the Doctrine of an Infallible Bible? London, 1863.
- The Holy Scriptures the original Great Exhibition for all Nations, an allegory, London, 1865.
- What a Pretty Garden! or Cause and Effect in Floriculture, Ashbourne, 1865.

The standard author abbreviation G.E.Sm. is used to indicate this person as the author when citing a botanical name.

== Notes ==
Attribution

This article incorporates text from a publication now in the public domain: Lee, Sidney, ed. (1898). "Smith, Gerard Edward". Dictionary of National Biography. Vol. 53. London: Smith, Elder & Co.
