= St John the Baptist's Church, Westbourne =

St John the Baptist's Church
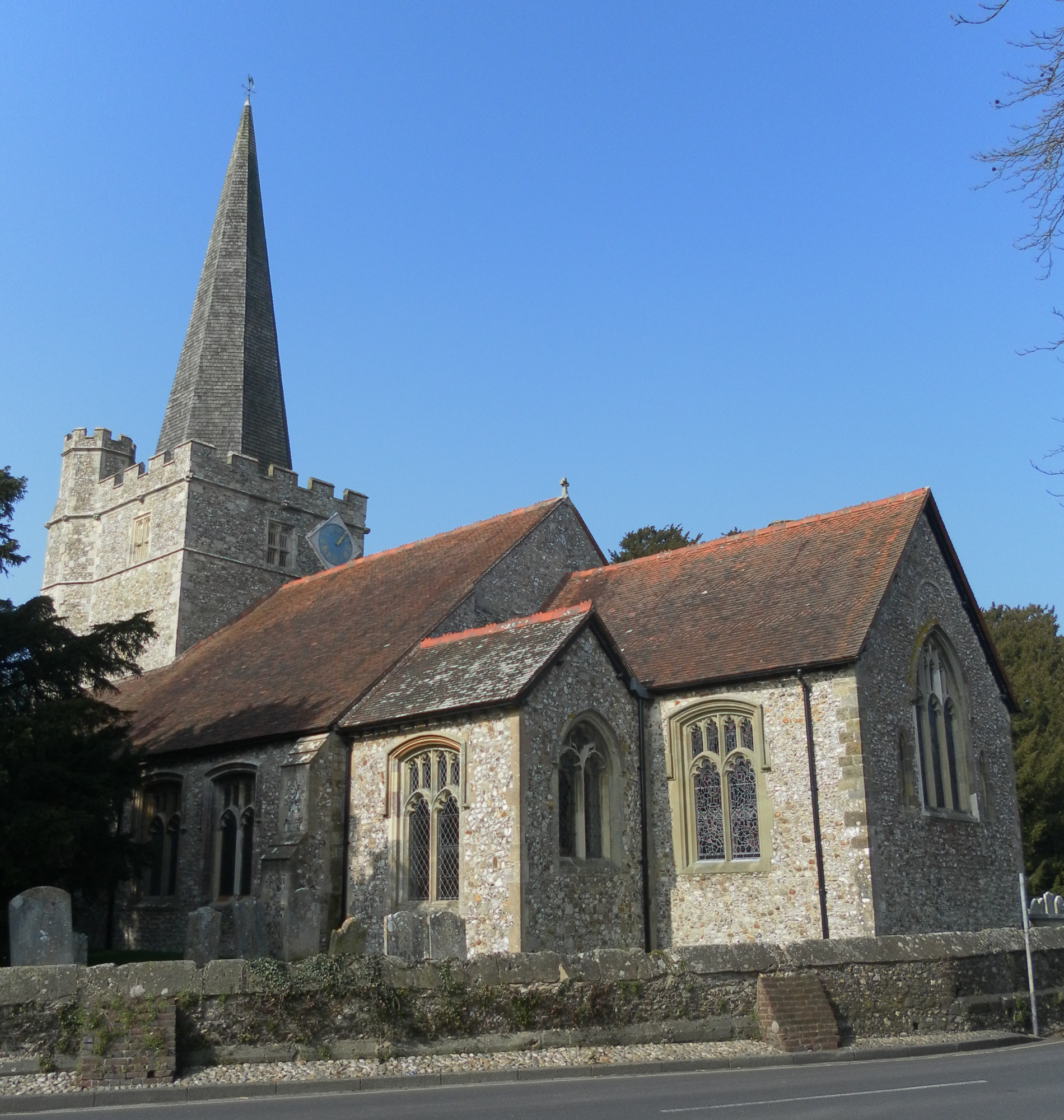
- St John the Baptist's Church
- 50.8604°N 0.9278°W
- Location: The Grove, Westbourne, West Sussex PO10 8UL
- Country: England
- Denomination: Anglican
- Website: http://westbourneparishchurch.org.uk

History
- Status: Parish church
- Founded: Early 13th Century
- Dedication: John the Baptist

Architecture
- Functional status: Active
- Heritage designation: Grade I listed
- Style: Perpendicular Gothic

Administration
- Province: Canterbury
- Diocese: Chichester
- Archdeaconry: Chichester
- Deanery: Westbourne

Clergy
- Rector: Rev. Andrew Doye

The Anglican Church of St John the Baptist, Westbourne is situated in the village of Westbourne, West Sussex. The church is part of the Diocese of Chichester and is dedicated to John the Baptist.

== History and architecture ==
The Domesday Book compiled in 1086 includes two churches entered under the Manor of Warblington (which at the time incorporated the Manor of Westbourne) It is possible that one of these either Saxon or Norman foundations was in Westbourne – potential evidence for this might be traced to claims made during the church's restoration in 1865, where "large square bases of early Norman pillars" were allegedly seen on the site where the present pillars stand. The current church that stands today consists of structures dating back to the early 13th century and other appendages and renovations since then.

In the early 13th century, the church included a nave with north and south aisles extending as far west as the present east arch of the tower, and a chancel of the present size. In the late 14th century, the rector and 6th Earl of Arundel carried out considerable alterations. The nave and aisles were extended west, the old west wall being penetrated by three arches, new windows were inserted in the aisles and the chancel and the tower in the south-west corner was probably erected; following these changes, the church reached its current size. In the early 16th century, the 11th Earl of Arundel refashioned the nave in the existing Gothic perpendicular style, replacing thick pillars and round arches with tall slender pillars and three-centred flat arches. The chancel was raised and widened, and the north porch was built – at the same time, the present west tower was built and its predecessor was taken down (the remains of a pier is still visible inside the church on the south wall of the south aisle).

In 1545, the Avenue of Yew Trees was planted; it is believed that it is the oldest in the United Kingdom. In 1598, the north and south galleries were erected over the aisles, dormer windows were added, a flat ceiling was added to the nave and the singing gallery was erected under the tower. In 1770, the then-Lord of the Manor the 2nd Earl of Halifax added a spire to the tower. The spire originally had an external gallery and an ornament. In 1797, the church was re-floored partly with Purbeck stone and brick, new pews were installed, old choir stalls in the chancel were cleared and painted glass was taken out of the chancel windows. In 1860, the gallery and ornament were removed from the spire and pinnacles were removed from the tower. In 1865, extensive restoration was carried out. boxed pews, galleries and flat ceilings were cleared away, dormer windows were removed, new pine pews were placed in the church and the south porch was built. The original stone north porch was dismantled and rebuilt in oak. These changes were described by architectural scholar Nikolaus Pevsner as being "really unpleasant". In 1876, the organ chamber was built and new choir seating was installed, and Philip Mainwaring Johnston undertook further work in 1932–33. In 1957, the spire was re-shingled and the weather vane that had been blown away in 1894 was re-erected. In 1978, the vestry was extended and in 1981 the church was re-floored in stone.

All of the stained glass present today was placed in the windows between 1865 and 1912, with the exception of the west window to the south aisle that was made from a collection of older glass and placed in the window in 1840. The church graveyard was closed to new burials in 1859 and is still lined by a fine wall.

In 1892, a tin church was built in the nearby village of Woodmancote and was incorporated into the benefice of Westbourne.

== Worship ==
Each Sunday, Parish Communion and early morning said communion are offered, together usually with a later service at the outlying church of Woodmancote or in the evening at the parish church. Evening Worship takes a variety of forms, including evening prayer, choral evensong and reflective and creative liturgies. On Wednesday, a morning service of Holy Communion also takes place. St John the Baptist Church uses both the Book of Common Prayer and Common Worship and seeks to offer regular services that will include worshippers of all ages. Its activities include Sunday school, a junior section to the choir and other youth involvement. Like many other English churches, music is an important part of worship as there is a strong choral foundation that is responsible for providing choral music.

Organ

The first record of an organ at the church was made in 1819, although little is known about the instrument. In 1862, a one manual organ constructed by J. W. Walker & Sons Ltd was installed - it was enlarged fourteen years later to include a second manual (Swell division) In 1890, W. J. Haywood of London carried out additions to the organ, including an 8' reed to the swell and 16' Open Wood to the pedals. Hele & Co of Plymouth rebuilt the organ in 1967, and notably replaced the mechanical action with electro-pneumatic action. In 2001, Kenneth Tickell & Co built a new organ that remains in use today.

- The organ, on the church website
- Details of the Kenneth Tickell organ from the National Pipe Register

Bells

Originally the church had four bells, as recorded in 1724, but the number has risen to six in 1770 and then to eight in 1933. At present the church uses full-circle ringing and the bells are rung for each of the Sunday services. The heaviest bell, a tenor bell, weighs almost half a ton and forms an octave with the other bells.

== List of rectors ==
- 1263 William De Perry
- 1302 Richard De Bourne
- 1316 John De Arundel
- 1331 John Appulby
- 1390 Robert Pubelow
- 1397 John Boor
- 1399 Robert Pubelow
- 1437 John Grendon
- 1441 Edward Poynings
- 1484 John Chamber
- 1512 John Aslaby
- 1520 Thomas Larbe
- 1530 David Llewellyn Egerly
- 1552 John Dawlyn
- 1554 Richard Marshall
- 1562 Henry Wilsha
- 1591 Thomas Wilsha
- 1614 Christopher Swale
- 1645 Lewis Hughes
- 1646 Thomas Prynne
- 1678 George Eales
- 1679 William Thomas
- 1687 Richard Brereton
- 1720 John Needham
- 1741 Henry Dawnay
- 1754 John Frankland
- 1778 William de Chair Tattersall
- 1829 Henry Garrett Newland
- 1862 John Hanson Sterling
- 1871 John Mee
- 1884 Lloyd Batley Birket
- 1931 Christopher Edward Vere Hodge
- 1945 Maitland Theophilus Dodds
- 1953 Norman Worton
- 1959 Arthur Blee
- 1963 John St Maur Williams
- 1970 Arnold Fredrick Nicholas
- 1976 Peter Michael Baden
- 1985 Kenneth Grace
- 1991 Bryan John Marshall
- 1996 Richard John Wells
- 2009 Frank Albert Wright
- 2017 Andrew Peter Charles Doye

== See also ==
- Grade I listed buildings in West Sussex
- List of current places of worship in Chichester (district)
