= Henry Garrett Newland =

English cleric and author

Henry Garrett Newland (19 March 1805 – 25 June 1860) was an English cleric and author, a supporter of the Tractarian movement.

== Life ==
Born in London in 1805, five years later he accompanied his father, Richard Bingham Newland (1780–1863), to Sicily, where he remained for seven years. In 1816 he was sent to school at Lausanne, Switzerland, to learn French. At the end of that year he returned to England.

In 1823, Newland matriculated at Christ's College, Cambridge, but then migrated to Corpus Christi College, where he graduated B.A. in 1827 and M.A. in 1830. After being ordained priest in 1829, he was, in September that year, presented to the sinecure rectory of Westbourne, West Sussex, and also held curacies in the diocese of Chichester, until January 1834, when he became vicar of Westbourne.

At St John the Baptist's Church, Westbourne, Newland established a daily choral service, and preached Tractarian doctrines. In the autumn of 1855 he moved to the vicarage of St Marychurch with Coffinswell, near Torquay in Devon, where Henry Phillpotts the bishop of Exeter appointed him his domestic chaplain. Phillpotts, not a Tractarian, approved of the movement.

Newland died unmarried at St. Marychurch, Devon on 25 June 1860.

== Works ==
Newland's main works were:

- The Erne, its Legends and its Fly-fishing, London, 1851.
- Confession and Absolution. The Sentiments of the Bishop of Exeter identical with those of the Reformers, London, 1852.
- Three Lectures on Tractarianism, delivered in the Town-hall, Brighton, four editions 1852–3.
- The Seasons of the Church: What they teach. A series of Sermons on the different Times and Occasions of the Christian Year, 3 vols.
- Postils. Short Sermons on the Parables, &c. Adapted from the Teaching of the Fathers.
- Confirmation and First Communion. A series of Essays, Lectures, Sermons, Conversations, and Heads of Catechising, relative to the Preparation of Catechumens, London, 1853, and again 1854.
- Forest Scenes in Norway and Sweden, London, 1854.
- Commentaries on Ephesians and Philippians, 1860, 2 vols.

He also wrote tracts and pamphlets.
