= Coates Castle SSSI =

UK Site of Special Scientific Interest

Coordinates: 50.964°N 0.591°W

- Site of Special Scientific Interest
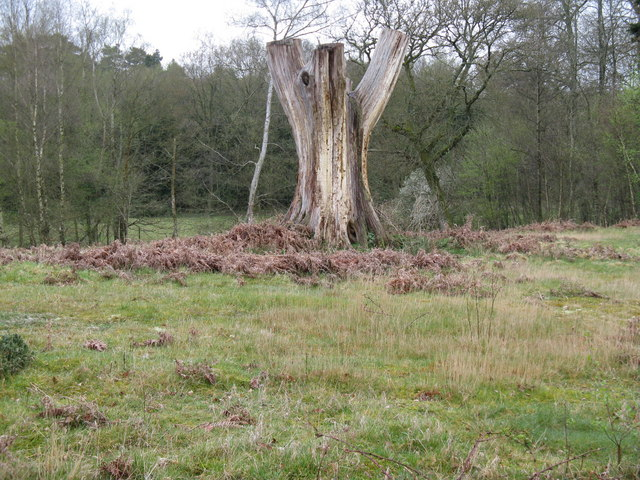
- Location of Coates Castle SSSI.
- Area of search: West Sussex
- Grid reference: SU 991 172
- Interest: Biological
- Area: 7.7 hectares (19 acres)
- Notification date: 1993
- Location map: Magic Map

Coates Castle SSSI is a 7.7-hectare (19-acre) biological Site of Special Scientific Interest west of Pulborough in West Sussex.

This site consists of three separate areas near Coates Castle. They contain the entire known population in Britain of Gryllus campestris, a field cricket which is protected under the Schedule 5 of the Wildlife and Countryside Act 1981. There are an estimated 200 individuals.

The site is private land with no public access.
