= George Sparkes =

English cricketer

Personal information
- Full name: George Sparkes
- Born: 8 August 1845; Westbourne, Sussex, England
- Died: 9 March 1908 (aged 62); Old Fishbourne, Sussex, England
- Batting: Unknown

Domestic team information
- Years: Team
- 1875: Sussex

Career statistics
Competition	First-class
Matches	1
Runs scored	0
Batting average	0.00
100s/50s	–/–
Top score	0
Catches/stumpings	–/–
- Source: Cricinfo, 14 November 2011

George Sparkes (8 August 1845 – 9 March 1908) was an English first-class cricketer.

Sparkes was born in August 1845 at Westbourne, Sussex. He made a single appearance in first-class cricket for Sussex against Hampshire in 1875 at Hove. He was dismissed for ducks in both of Sussex's innings, by Henry Tate in their first-innings and by Arthur Ridley in their second-innings. He died on 9 March 1908 at Old Fishbourne, Sussex.
