= John Boor =

14th-century dean

John Boor (died c. 1402) was Dean and Canons of Windsor from 1389 to 1402 and Dean of the Chapel Royal.

== Career ==
He was appointed:

- Rector of St Creed, Grantpound 1384
- Dean of the Chapel Royal
- Rector of St John the Baptist's Church, Westbourne 1397 - 1399
- Prebendary of Gates in Chichester 1390 - 1397
- Prebendary of Middleton in Wherwell
- Prebendary of Charminster
- Prebendary of Oundle
- Prebendary of Shaftesbury
- Prebendary of Bridgnorth
- Dean of St Buryan's Church, Cornwall.

He was appointed to the twelfth stall in St George's Chapel, Windsor Castle in 1398, and held the stall until 1402.
