= Marden, West Sussex =

Civil parish in West Sussex, England

Coordinates: 50.92987°N 0.85556°W

Marden
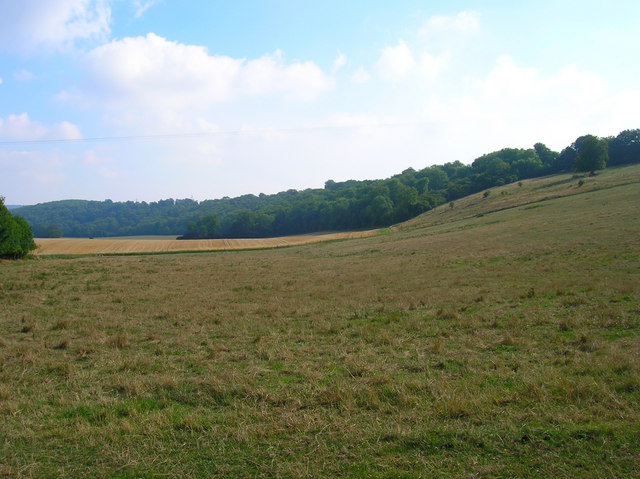
- Up Marden Ridge

- Location within West Sussex
- Area: 6.63 km^{2} (2.56 sq mi)
- Population: 79 2001 Census
  - Density: 12/km^{2} (31/sq mi)
- OS grid reference: SU804151
  - London: 51 miles (82 km) NE
- Civil parish: Marden
- District: Chichester
- Shire county: West Sussex
- Region: South East
- Country: England
- Sovereign state: United Kingdom
- Post town: CHICHESTER
- Postcode district: PO18
- Dialling code: 01243
- Police: Sussex
- Fire: West Sussex
- Ambulance: South East Coast
- UK Parliament: Chichester

Marden is a civil parish in the Chichester district of West Sussex, England. It lies on the South Downs and comprises the villages of North Marden and East Marden.

== Cricket ==
In 1680, lines written in an old bible invite: "All you that do delight in Cricket, come to Marden, pitch your wickets". This is the earliest known reference in cricket history to the wicket.
