= Codmore Hill =

Village in West Sussex, England

Coordinates: 50.97194°N 0.49603°W

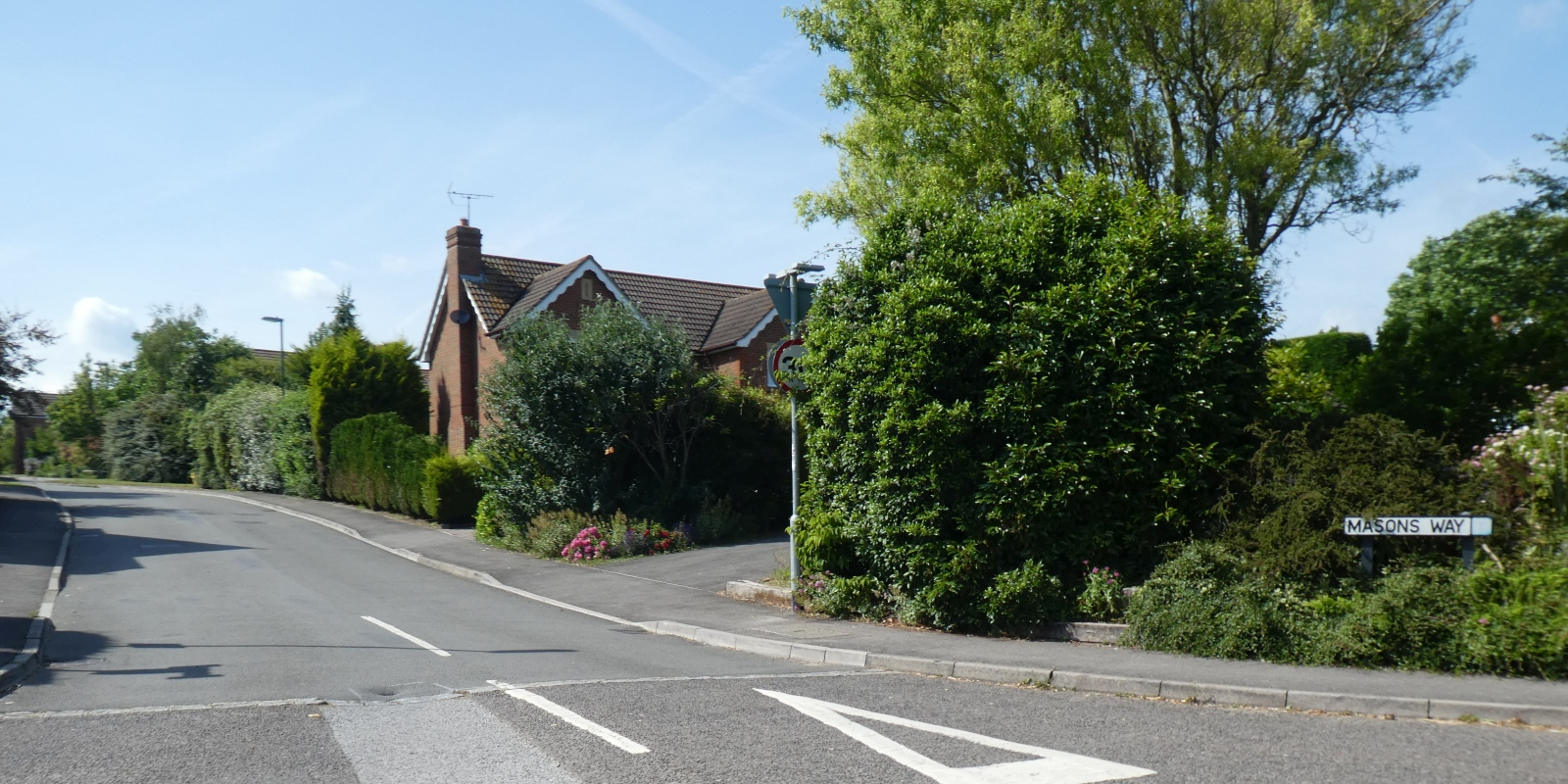
- Masons Way

- Location within West Sussex
- OS grid reference: TQ056202
- Civil parish: Pulborough
- District: Horsham
- Shire county: West Sussex
- Region: South East
- Country: England
- Sovereign state: United Kingdom
- Post town: Pulborough
- Postcode district: RH20 1
- Police: Sussex
- Fire: West Sussex
- Ambulance: South East Coast
- UK Parliament: Arundel and South Downs

Codmore Hill is a hamlet in the Horsham District of West Sussex, England. It lies on the A29 road 1 mile (1.6 km) north of Pulborough. It is in the civil parish of Sutton.
