= James Bowes-Lyon =

British Army general (1917–1977)

Major-General Sir James Bowes-Lyon KCVO CB OBE MC*
- Bowes-Lyon in 1967
- Born: 19 September 1917; Chelsea, London, England
- Died: 18 December 1977 (aged 60); Northumberland, England
- Military career
- Allegiance: United Kingdom
- Branch: British Army
- Service years: 1938–1973
- Rank: Major-General
- Service number: 74591
- Unit: Grenadier Guards
- Commands: London District; Household Division; British Forces in Berlin; 52nd Lowland Division District; 157th Lowland Brigade; 2nd Battalion Grenadier Guards
- Conflicts: Second World War
- Awards: Knight Commander of the Royal Victorian Order; Companion of the Order of the Bath; Officer of the Order of the British Empire; Military Cross & Bar

Major-General Sir Francis James Cecil Bowes-Lyon, KCVO, CB, OBE, MC & Bar (19 September 1917 – 18 December 1977) was a senior British Army officer who served as commandant of the British Sector in Berlin from 1968 to 1970.

== Early life and education ==
Bowes-Lyon was born in Chelsea, London, the son of Captain Geoffrey Francis Bowes-Lyon, grandson of Claude Bowes-Lyon, 13th Earl of Strathmore and Kinghorne and Frances Bowes-Lyon, Countess of Strathmore and Kinghorne. He was thus a first cousin of Queen Elizabeth The Queen Mother. His mother was Edith Katherine Selby-Bigge, daughter of Sir Amherst Selby-Bigge, 1st Baronet. He was educated at Eton College and Sandhurst.

== Military career ==
Bowes-Lyon was commissioned into the Grenadier Guards in 1938, and served in the Guards Armoured Division during the Second World War. In 1955 he became commandant at the Guards Depot and in 1957 he was made commanding officer of the 2nd Battalion Grenadier Guards. He was appointed Military Assistant to Field Marshal Sir Francis Festing, the Chief of the Imperial General Staff, in 1960 and commander of the 157th Lowland Brigade in 1963.

Bowes-Lyon went on to be General Officer Commanding 52nd Lowland Division District in 1966 and commandant of the British Sector in Berlin in 1968. In 1971 he was appointed Major-General commanding the Household Division and General Officer Commanding London District. He retired in 1973.

== Personal life ==
Bowes-Lyon married Mary de Trafford, daughter of Sir Humphrey de Trafford, 4th Baronet. The couple had three children, two sons, John and David, and a daughter, Fiona. The family lived at Sennicotts in West Sussex. He was a Gentleman Usher to the Royal Household.

Military offices
Preceded by Henry Leask	GOC 52nd (Lowland) Infantry Division; 1966–1968	Post disbanded
Preceded by Sir John Nelson	Commandant, British Sector in Berlin; 1968–1970	Succeeded by Lord Cathcart
Preceded by Lord Michael Fitzalan-Howard	GOC London District; 1971–1973	Succeeded by Sir Philip Ward
