= Sennicotts =

Estate in West Sussex, England

Coordinates: 50°51′24″N 00°48′44″W

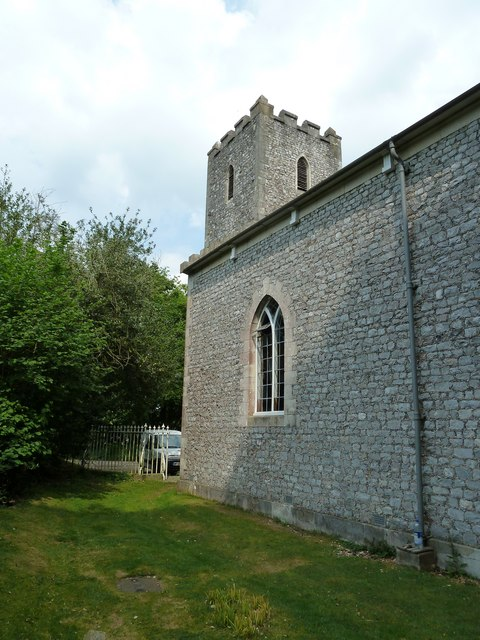
St Mary, Sennicotts

Sennicotts is a small estate near Chichester, West Sussex, England, formed in 1809 by Charles Baker (1761–1839) having retired after serving in Madras, with the British East India Company. In the following years, he built the house (1810), the lodge (1815) and the chapel (1829). Charles Baker was the son of a Chichester surgeon, and claimed descent from the Bakers of Mayfield, the great Sussex Ironmasters.

The architect of the house is thought to have been James Elmes (1782–1862), who is known to have submitted a design for Oakwood, the house opposite Sennicotts, and who lived at Oving, West Sussex nearby. Elmes was a friend of Sir John Soane, and architectural features such as the entrance hall, which is cube shaped and has a ceiling of shallow ‘groined’ vaulting, is very similar to Soane's drawing room at Aynhoe Park. The ends of the hall are in the form of shallow apses, with marbled niches, and below the bold cornice runs an egg-and-dart moulding. Both the drawing and dining rooms at Sennicotts have coved ceilings with a bead moulding on the ceiling flat, and an unusual leaf enriched torus moulding at the cornice.

Charles Baker lived until 1839, when the estate passed to his nephew, Christopher Teesdale. The Teesdales did not inhabit the house, but continued to be buried in the family vault below the chapel, until it was made into a Church for this part of the extensive Parish of Funtington, following the sale of the rest of the estate in 1929.

Between 1839 and 1929, the house was let to a succession of tenants, the most notable being Prince Louis of Battenberg, who had Sennicotts as his first home after his marriage in 1884. The house is mentioned in David Duff's “Hessian Tapestry”, and another book called “Louis and Victoria”, and in an earlier work on Prince Louis written by Mark Kerr, the Prince's letter at the end of June 1885 says how sad he was to leave Sennicotts.

The new owner in 1929 was William P. Wilson, who built the Music Room with a fine Venetian window at one end, a bow window at the side, and a shallow vaulted ceiling of the kind favoured by Repton, Soane and other Regency architects.

After a period as 'Combined Operations' during the Second World War, the house was purchased by Captain Geoffrey Bowes-Lyon, first cousin of Queen Elizabeth the Queen Mother. After his death in 1951, the house was occupied by his son, Major-General Sir James Bowes-Lyon, when not stationed in Germany.

The house was sold to the late Mrs. Rowland Rank, sister-in-law of J Arthur Rank and daughter-in-law of Joseph Rank the flour miller, in 1961 and it remains in her family.

Alternative historic spelling of Sennicotts: Sennicots, Sennicott, Scynecat (1810)
