= Coates, West Sussex =

Village in West Sussex, England

Coates
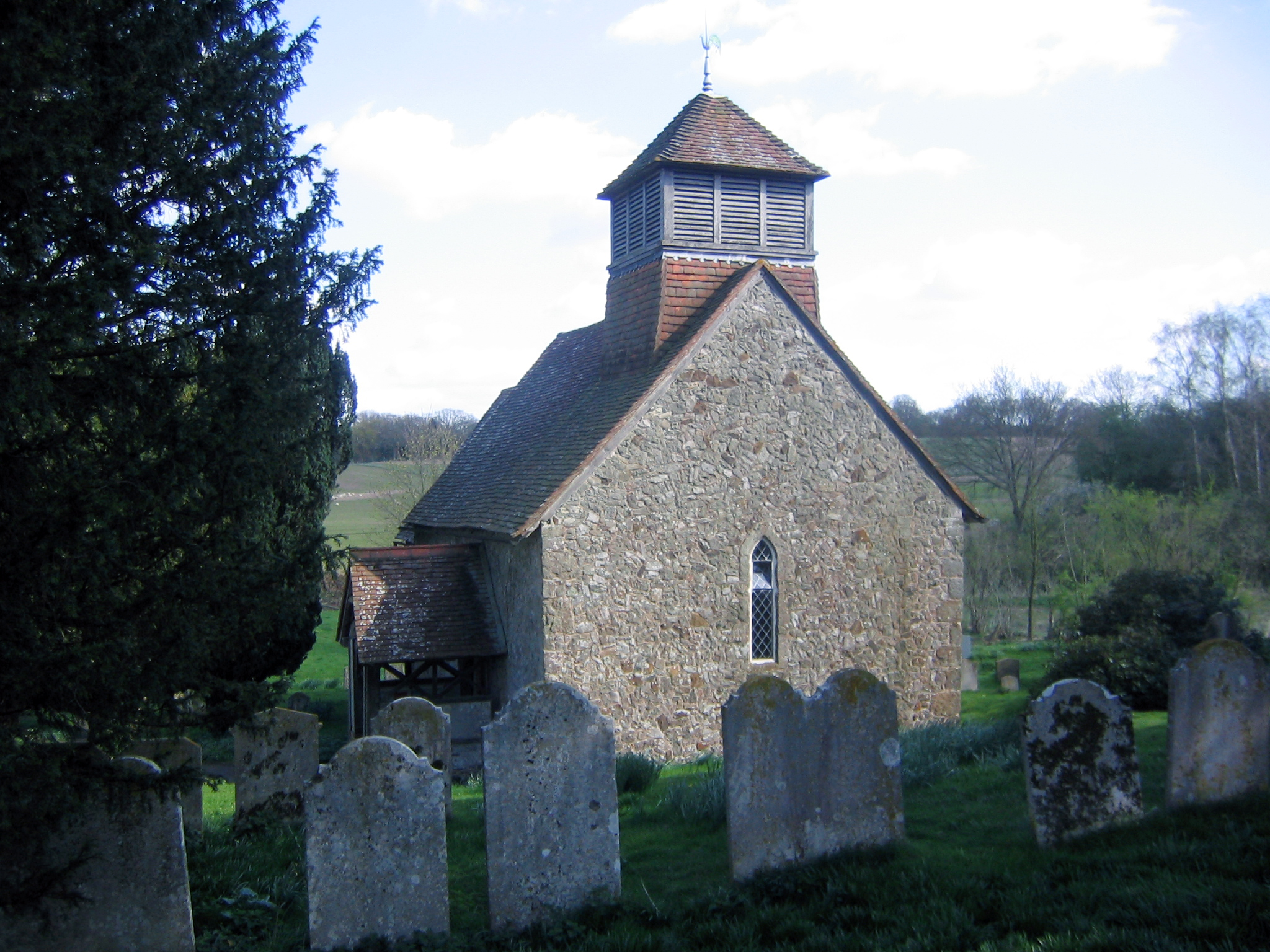
- Church of St. Agatha

- Location within West Sussex
- OS grid reference: SU998179
- Civil parish: Fittleworth
- District: Chichester
- Shire county: West Sussex
- Region: South East
- Country: England
- Sovereign state: United Kingdom
- Police: Sussex
- Fire: West Sussex
- Ambulance: South East Coast
- UK Parliament: Arundel and South Downs

Coates Castle
- Site of Special Scientific Interest
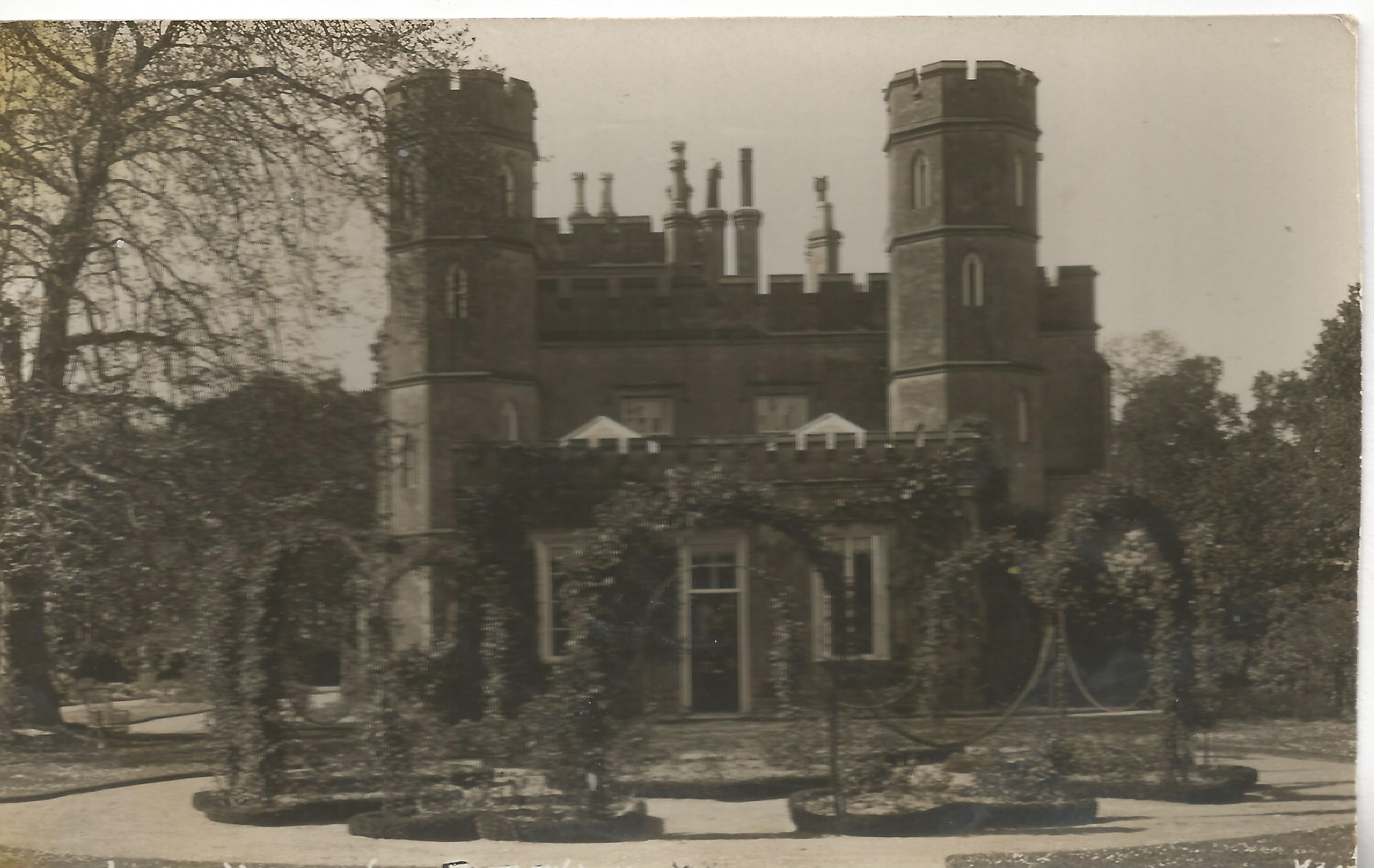
- Location of Coates Castle.
- Area of search: West Sussex
- Grid reference: SU991175
- Coordinates: 50.9483°N 0.588398°W
- Interest: Biological
- Area: 7.59 ha (18.8 acres)
- Notification date: 1993

Coates is a downland village in the civil parish of Fittleworth, in the Chichester district of West Sussex, England. Coates lies one mile (1.7 km) southwest from Fittleworth and four miles (6.8 km) south-east-by-south from Petworth. It is within the ancient divisions of the Bury Hundred and the Rape of Arundel. The village is bounded north by the Rother Navigation. On 1 April 1933 the parish was abolished and merged with Fittleworth. At the 1931 census (the last before the abolition of the parish), Coates had a population of 70.

== Coates Manor House ==
Coates Manor House is Elizabethan in origin and the former seat of the Coates family whose name is given to the village. It is well known for its gardens that are available for public viewing by appointment as part of the National Gardens Scheme.

== Coates Castle ==
Coates Castle, a Grade-II mansion listed by English Heritage lies on land above the village in a position that affords extensive views across the Sussex countryside. It was built in 1820 by John King in the Strawberry Hill gothic style and was extensively renovated in the early twenty-first century after years of gradual decline. It is the place where Louisa Hamilton, Duchess of Abercorn, an ancestor of Princes William and Harry, died on 31 March 1905.(There is a memorial inside the church commemorating her life) and visitors to the house are known to have included Sir Winston Churchill and Kaiser Wilhelm.

During the Second World War it was requisitioned and used by the army. It was here in 1940-41 that Lieutenant- colonel Stewart Blacker invented the Spigot Mortar or Blacker Bombard a cheap and easily produced piece of anti-tank ordnance required after the British Army's heavy equipment had been lost at Dunkirk. It was used extensively by the Home Guard.

In the fifties it was owned by the former Master of the Hursley and Hambledon Hunt Gerald Joynson who renovated it and eccentrically installed in a room a specially constructed coffin for himself.

== Conservation area ==
Coates Castle SSSI is a Site of Special Scientific Interest. It consists of three blocks of land all within a one kilometre radius of Coates Castle which contain the only known British population of Gryllus campestris, a field cricket protected under Schedule 5 of the Wildlife and Countryside Act 1981.

Coates Common and Lords Piece are areas of Sussex heathland containing breeding populations of heathland birds including Nightjar and Dartford Warbler.

== St Agatha's Church ==
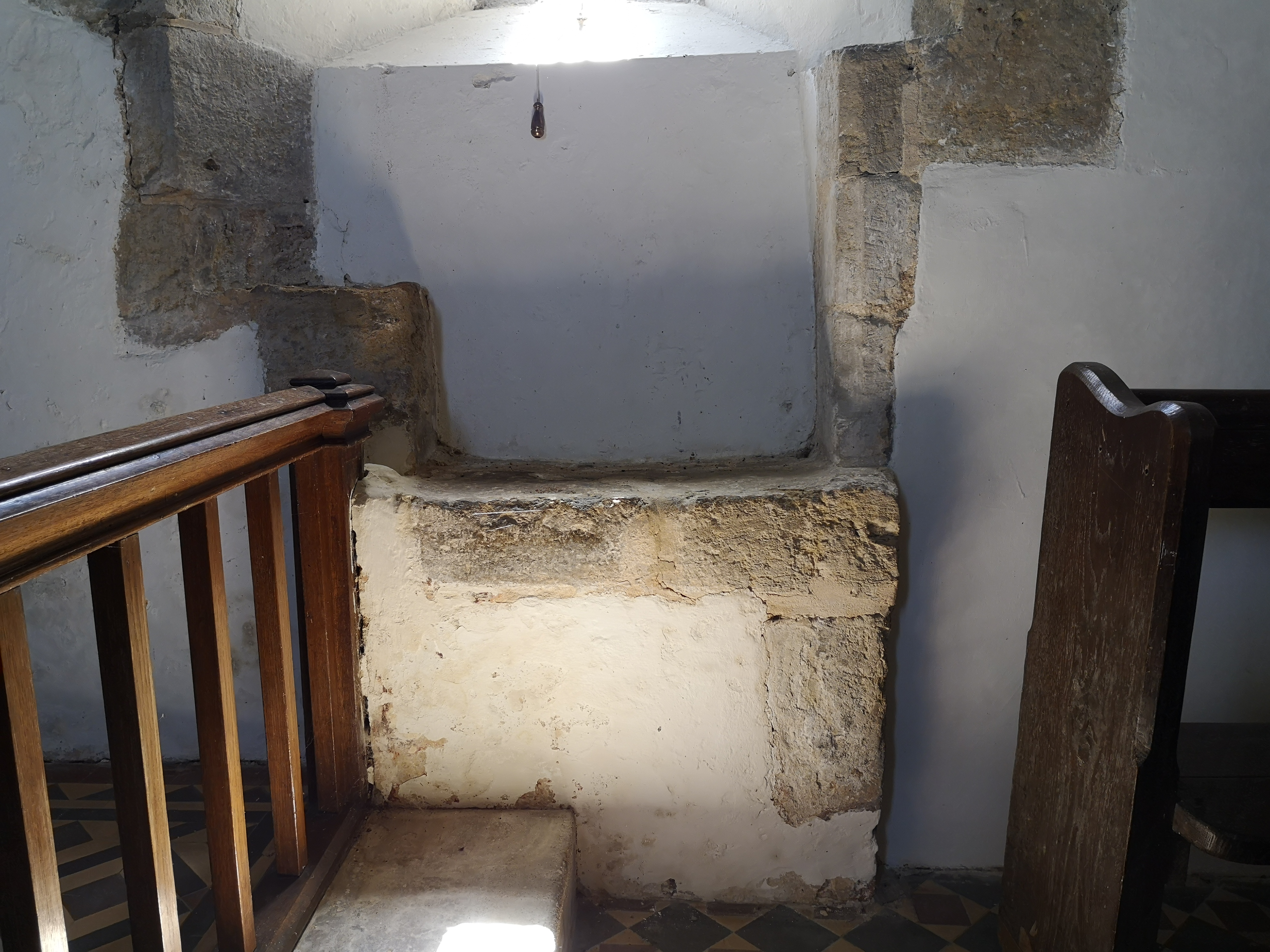
12th Century sedilie (priest's chair St.Agathas's Coates

The Anglican church of St Agatha is first recorded in about 1100 in the Chartulary of Lewes Priory, stating that the Church of "Cotes" made an annual donation to the Prior. The church is of early English style and consists of a single nave now covered by a wood floor with a bellcote (rebuilt 1961) and a small square chancel. The chancel arch is plain and half circular. One Norman window has survived on the south wall. The larger windows are late 14th century and of early English lancet type. A small Sussex marble lead-lined font stands extant at the west end of the nave and constructed within the south wall of the chancel is a sedile ( pl sedilia) or priest's chair. Unusually the entrance to the church is on the north side presumably for the ease of the residents from the nearby manor house Coates Manor.The Registers date from 1559 and the living is linked to nearby Burton (Bodecton). Since 1982 St Agatha's has been within the parish of Barlavington and Sutton and Bignor.
