= Sutton, West Sussex =

Village and parish in West Sussex, England

Coordinates: 50.92767°N 0.60824°W

Sutton
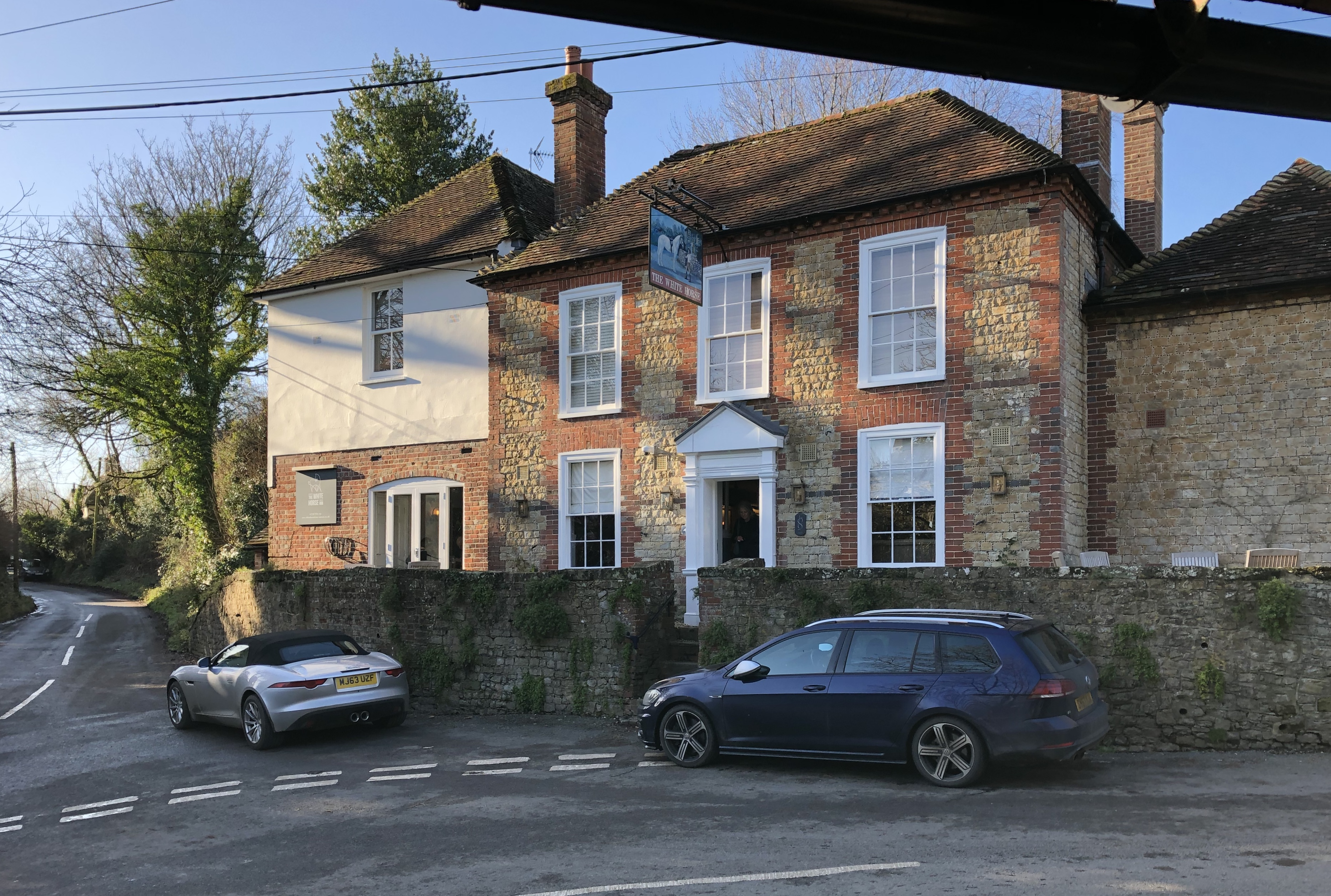
- The White Horse at junction

- Location within West Sussex
- Area: 9.20 km^{2} (3.55 sq mi)
- Population: 425. 2011 Census
  - Density: 21/km^{2} (54/sq mi)
- OS grid reference: SU979151
  - London: 45 miles (72 km) NNE
- Civil parish: Sutton
- District: Chichester
- Shire county: West Sussex
- Region: South East
- Country: England
- Sovereign state: United Kingdom
- Post town: PULBOROUGH
- Postcode district: RH20
- Dialling code: 01798
- Police: Sussex
- Fire: West Sussex
- Ambulance: South East Coast
- UK Parliament: Arundel and South Downs

Sutton is a village, Anglican parish and civil parish in the District of Chichester in West Sussex, England, 4 miles (6.4 km) south of Petworth and east of the A285 road. The parish has a land area of 920 hectares (2272 acres). In the 2001 census 192 people lived in 83 households, of whom 83 were economically active. The 2011 Census population included the village of Barlavington and hamlet of Codmore Hill.

The village has an Anglican church dedicated to St John the Baptist, and a pub, the White Horse.

== Landmarks ==
Lords Piece at Coates is a Site of Special Scientific Interest within the parish which at one time contained the entire known remaining British population of the field cricket Gryllus campestris. Coates Castle is within the neighbouring parish of Fittleworth.

== Notable people ==
- Sir Gerald Barry a British newspaper editor and organiser of the Festival of Britain, lived at Forge House, which was remodelled for him by F. R. S. Yorke in 1937.
