= Kirdford =

Village and parish in West Sussex, England

Coordinates: 51.02988°N 0.54965°W

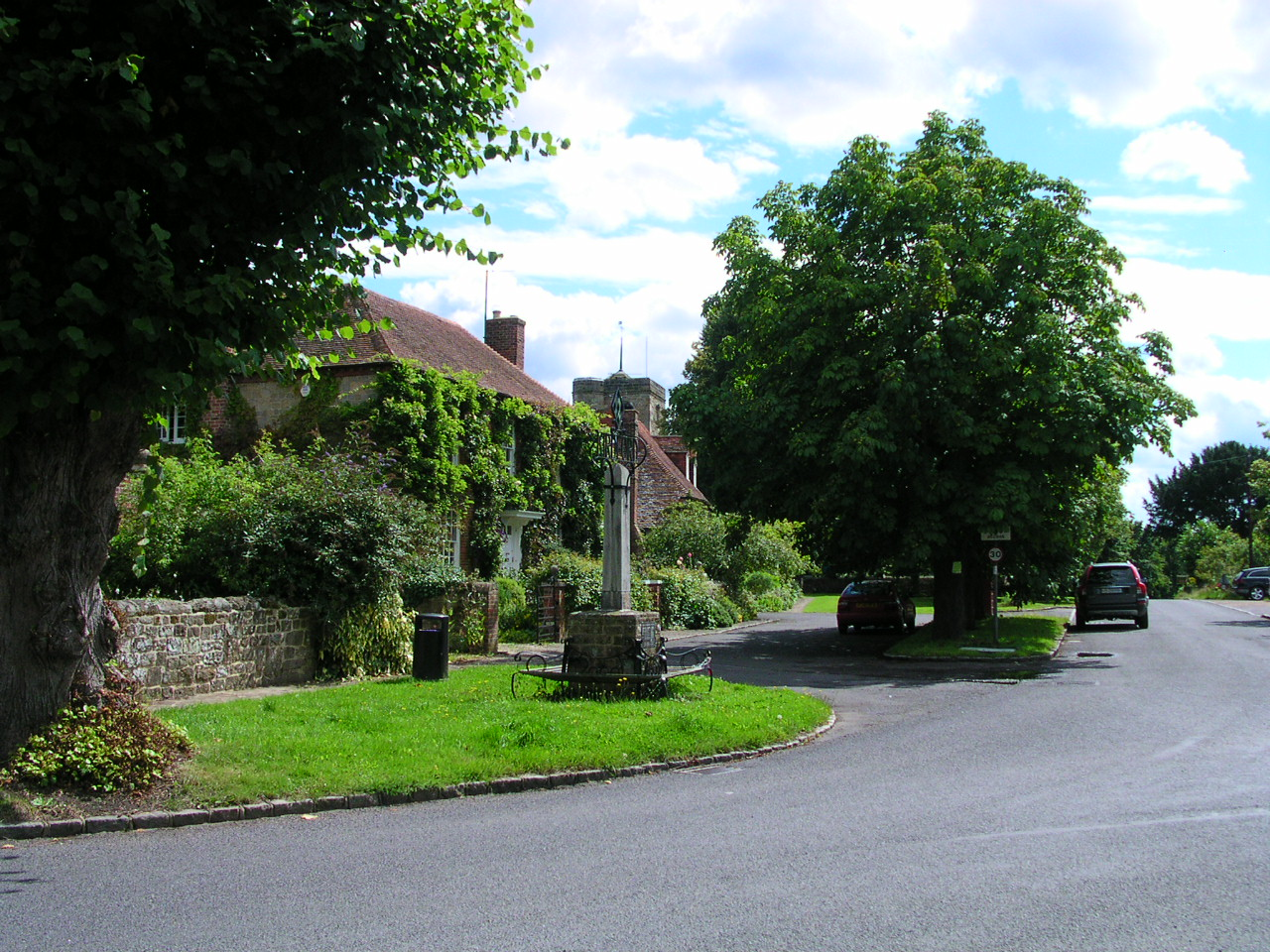

- Location within West Sussex
- Area: 20.09 km^{2} (7.76 sq mi)
- Population: 1,063 (2011)
  - Density: 45/km^{2} (120/sq mi)
- OS grid reference: TQ017266
  - London: 38 miles (61 km) NNE
- Civil parish: Kirdford
- District: Chichester
- Shire county: West Sussex
- Region: South East
- Country: England
- Sovereign state: United Kingdom
- Post town: BILLINGSHURST
- Postcode district: RH14
- Dialling code: 01403
- Police: Sussex
- Fire: West Sussex
- Ambulance: South East Coast
- UK Parliament: Horsham

Kirdford is a village and civil parish in the Chichester District of West Sussex, England. Its nearest town is Petworth, located 6.5 miles (10.5 km) southwest of the village. The parish has an area of 2,008 acres (813 ha). In the 2001 census 912 people lived in 373 households, of whom 448 were economically active. At the 2011 census the population was 1,063.

The village has an Anglican church dedicated to St John the Baptist plus an Evangelical non-denominational chapel "Kirdford chapel" and two pubs, The Foresters Arms and the Half Moon. Other amenities include a shop and the village hall which was enlarged in 1977.

In the Middle Ages iron production using ironstone and charcoal, and forest glass making were important industries. In the twentieth century apple growing was established through a cooperative venture, Kirdford Growers, based at the western end of the village. This has now ended and the warehouse site is being used for house building.

In 2011, Kirdford Village Stores won 'Best Corner Shop' in the Telegraph's Best Small Shops in Britain Awards.

== The parish church ==
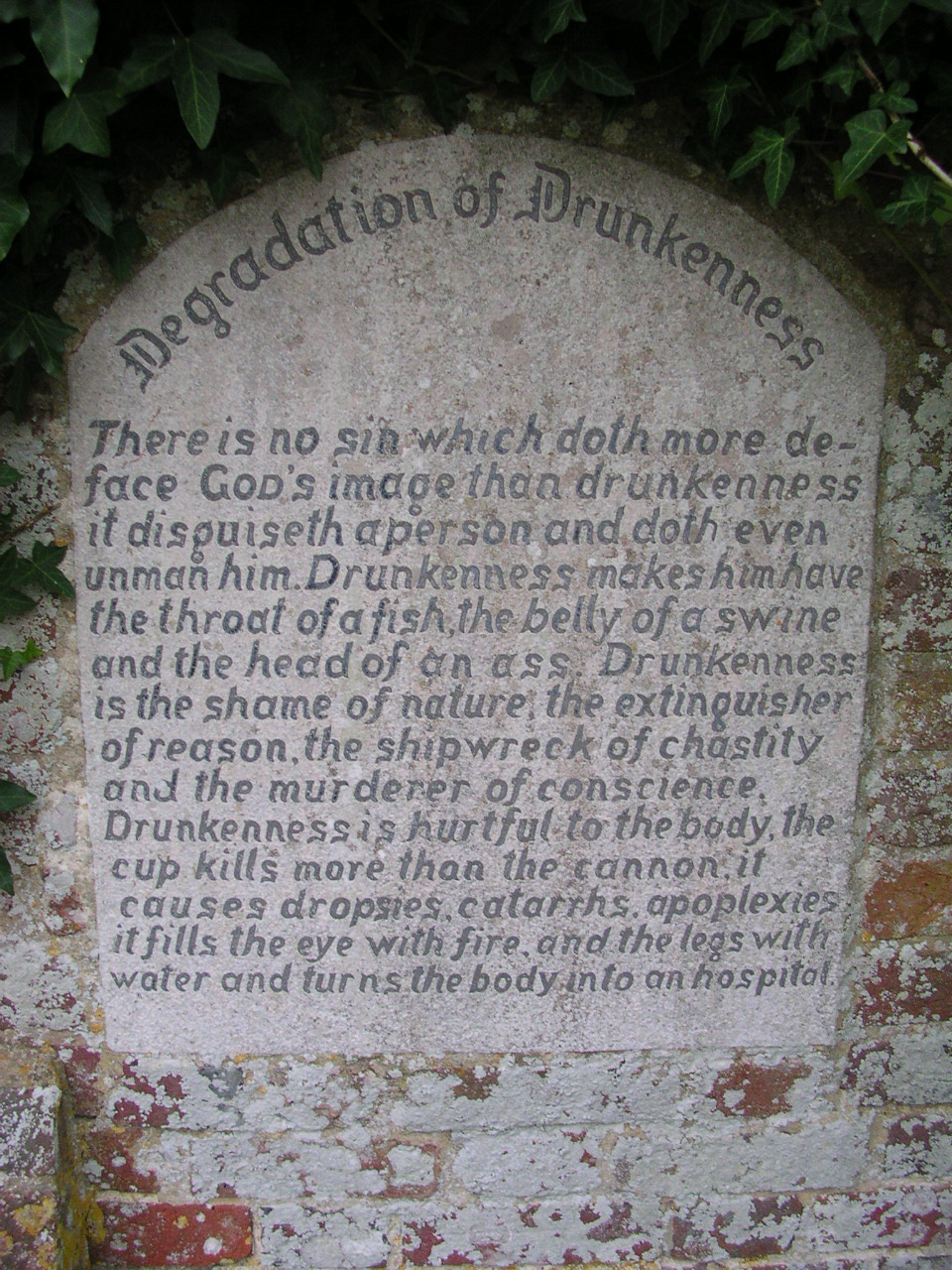
Inscription on the old rectory wall

There is no reference to a church in the Domesday Book of 1086. The Grade I listed church of St. John the Baptist is built of local sandstone and roofed with Horsham stone slabs. Herringbone masonry and the style of column capitals indicate that the nave is early twelfth century. The north aisle is thirteenth century and the tower fifteenth. The tower carries a peel of six bells and a clock. There are four stained glass windows by Charles Eamer Kempe.

Near the road junction to the west of the church an inscribed stone set into the old rectory wall warns against drunkenness in no uncertain terms.
