= Linch =

Parish in West Sussex, England

Coordinates: 51.04065°N 0.77201°W

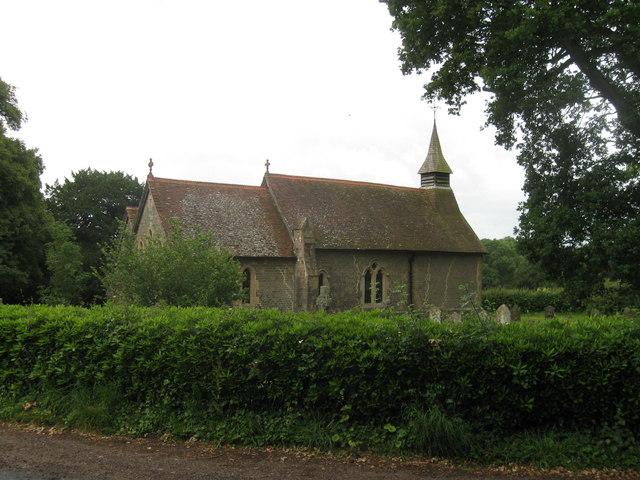

- Location within West Sussex
- Area: 3.44 km^{2} (1.33 sq mi)
- Population: 78 2001 Census
  - Density: 23/km^{2} (60/sq mi)
- OS grid reference: SU861275
  - London: 43 miles (69 km) NE
- Civil parish: Linch
- District: Chichester
- Shire county: West Sussex
- Region: South East
- Country: England
- Sovereign state: United Kingdom
- Post town: LIPHOOK
- Postcode district: GU30
- Dialling code: 01428
- Police: Sussex
- Fire: West Sussex
- Ambulance: South East Coast
- UK Parliament: Chichester

Linch is an Anglican parish, and a loose collection of hamlets that make up the civil parish of the same name in the Chichester District of West Sussex, England, 5 miles (8.0 km) northwest of Midhurst. It has an eighteenth-century church dedicated to St Luke.

== History ==
=== Norman period ===
Linch (Lince) was listed in the Domesday Book (1086) in the ancient hundred of Easebourne as having 14 households: seven villagers, five smallholders and two slaves; with woodland, meadows, ploughing land and a church, it had a value to the lord of the manor, Robert, son of Theobald, of £5.

=== 19th century ===
In 1861, the parish area was 1,220 acres (490 ha), described as "chiefly waste or woodland", and a population of 111.

=== 21st century ===
In the 2001 census there were 29 households in the civil parish with a total population of 78 of whom 40 were economically active.

== Parish church ==
According to Kelly's Directory of 1867, the parish church of St Luke was built around 1700. It contains an unusual stained glass window of much earlier date; the stone church is otherwise plain.

== Hollycombe Steam Collection ==
The Hollycombe Steam Collection is in the parish.
