= Woodmancote, Chichester District =

Village in West Sussex, England

Coordinates: 50.86215°N 0.89951°W

Woodmancote
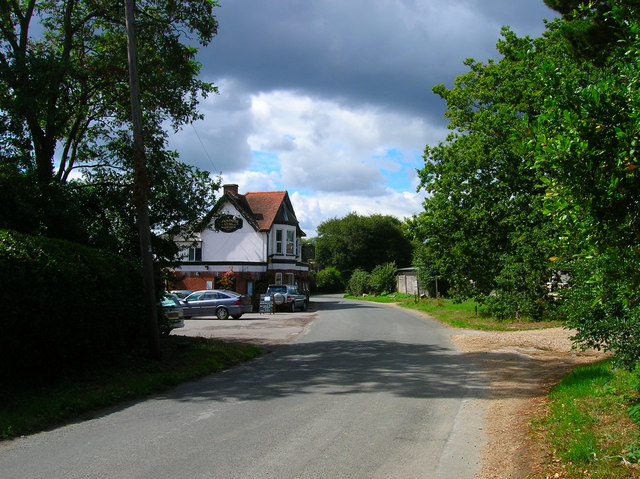

- Location within West Sussex
- OS grid reference: SU775075
- Civil parish: Westbourne
- District: Chichester
- Shire county: West Sussex
- Region: South East
- Country: England
- Sovereign state: United Kingdom
- Post town: Emsworth
- Postcode district: PO10
- Police: Sussex
- Fire: West Sussex
- Ambulance: South East Coast
- UK Parliament: Chichester

Woodmancote is a village in the Chichester district of West Sussex, England. It lies just off the B2147 road 2 miles (3.2 km) northeast of Emsworth. It should not be confused with the other West Sussex village of Woodmancote near Henfield. At the 2011 Census the population of this village was included in the civil parish of Westbourne.

The village hosts a pub called Woodmancote Pub.
