= East Marden =

Village in West Sussex, England

Coordinates: 50.925°N 0.853°W

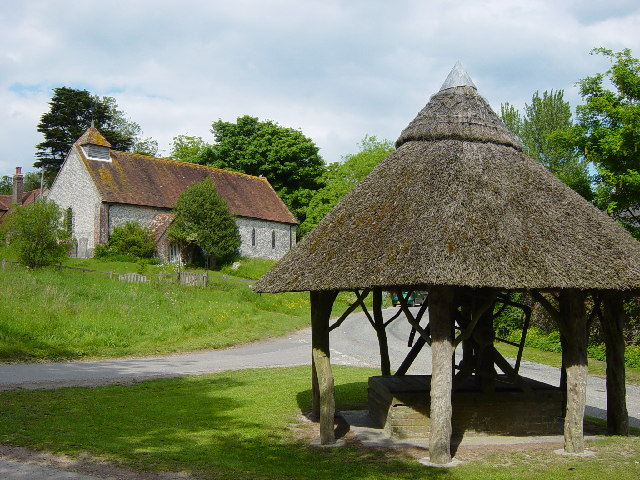
- Church and well

- Location within West Sussex
- OS grid reference: SU807146
- Civil parish: Marden
- District: Chichester
- Shire county: West Sussex
- Region: South East
- Country: England
- Sovereign state: United Kingdom
- Post town: Chichester
- Postcode district: PO18
- Police: Sussex
- Fire: West Sussex
- Ambulance: South East Coast
- UK Parliament: Chichester

East Marden is a village and former civil parish, now in the parish of Marden, in the Chichester district of West Sussex, England. It is on the spur of the South Downs It is first mentioned in the Domesday Book as Meredone and was given in 1086 to Roger, Earl of Montgomery. The church, St Peters (UK Ordnance Survey grid reference SU807145), dates from the 12th century and is still used for worship every other Sunday. Its oldest house today dates back to 1728 ( Salzman, 1953). The village, some 100 metres above sea level, is in an area of unusually high rainfall. Its most famous landmark is the thatched well on the village green. The population has remained static for over a century. In 1931 the parish had a population of 80. On 1 April 1933 the parish was abolished to form "Marden".
