= North Marden =

Village and parish in West Sussex, England

Coordinates: 50.93906°N 0.84994°W

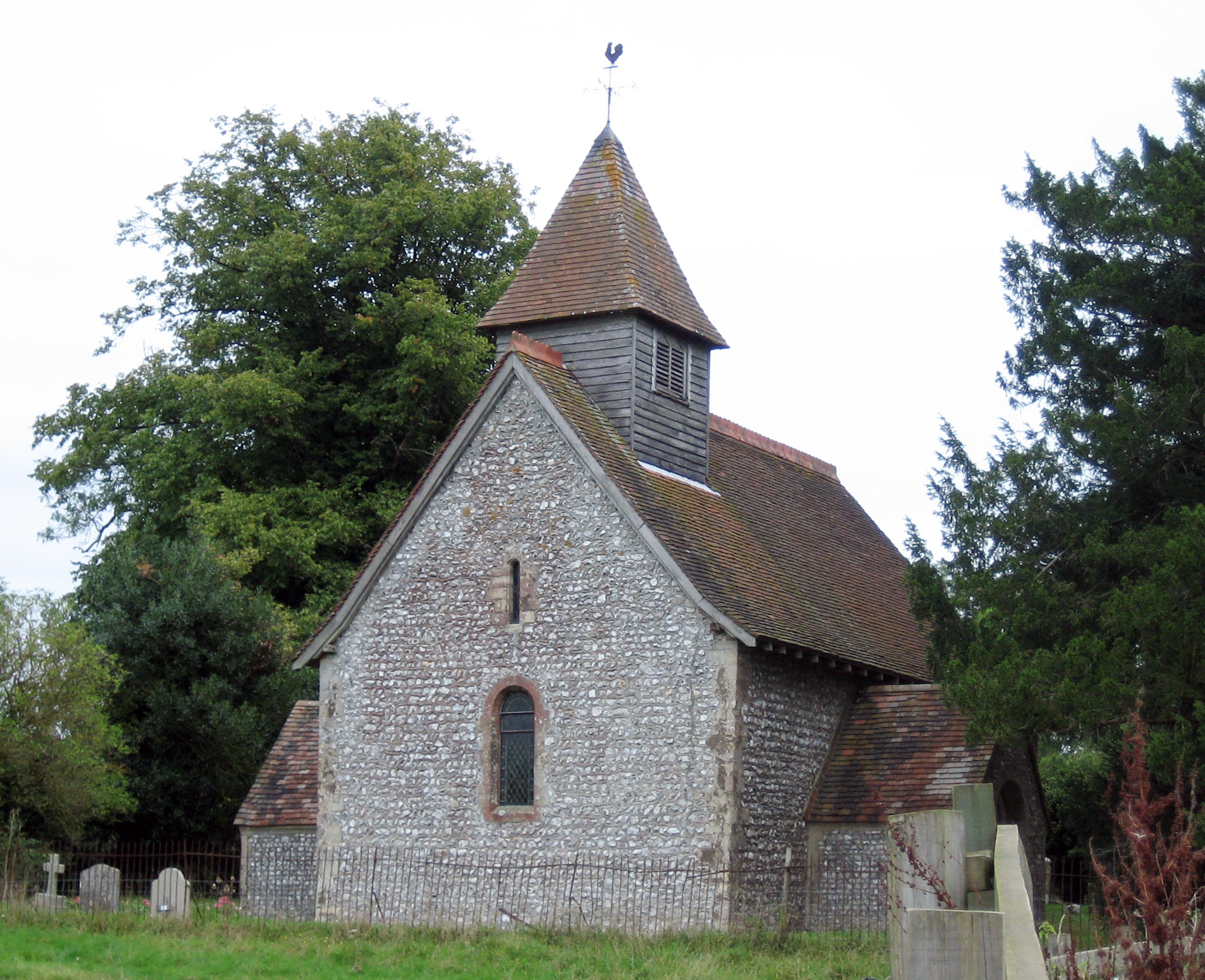
- Church of St. Mary

- Location within West Sussex
- OS grid reference: SU809161
- Civil parish: Marden
- District: Chichester
- Shire county: West Sussex
- Region: South East
- Country: England
- Sovereign state: United Kingdom
- Post town: CHICHESTER
- Postcode district: PO18
- Dialling code: 01243
- Police: Sussex
- Fire: West Sussex
- Ambulance: South East Coast
- UK Parliament: Chichester

North Marden is a tiny village and former civil parish, now in the parish of Marden, in the Chichester district of West Sussex, England. It is 7.5 miles (12 km) northwest of Chichesteron the spur of the South Downs and on the B2141 road. In 1931 the parish had a population of 12. On 1 April 1933 the parish was abolished to from "Marden".

North Marden is one of the smallest, out-of-the-way parishes in Sussex. At the end of the 19th century the population was between 20 and 30 inhabitants. The parish is mentioned in the Taxatio records of Pope Nicholas IV (1291) and in the Novae return (1341).

The plan of the Church of St Mary, approached through a farmyard, is simple but unusual in the chancel having an apsidal, or semi-circular termination. The elaborate Norman south doorway in Caen stone suggests a date of the middle of the 12th century. The three Norman windows in the apse have been restored, but the jambs and rere-arches are ancient along with the small Norman window at the west end. The Norman sandstone font was provided an octagonal stem base in the 14th century, and parts of the ancient flint walls were repaired in places with 18th-century brickwork. The single bell dates from 1829. A bench has been placed outside the western wall of the church.
