= Westbourne, West Sussex =

Village and parish in West Sussex, England

Coordinates: 50.8614°N 0.9263°W

Westbourne
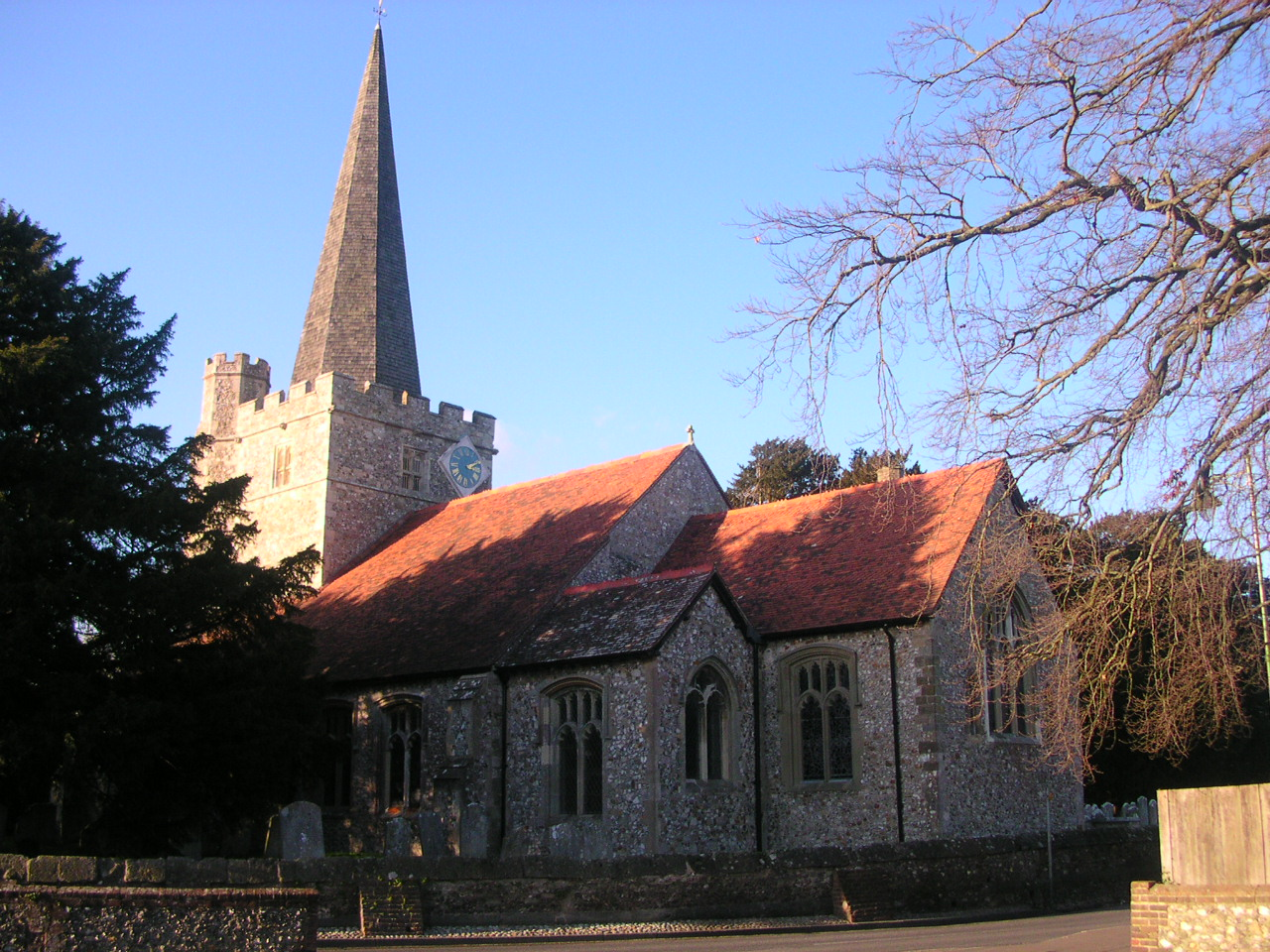
- St John the Baptist Church

- Location within West Sussex
- Area: 7.47 km^{2} (2.88 sq mi)
- Population: 2,309 2011 Census
  - Density: 286/km^{2} (740/sq mi)
- OS grid reference: SU756074
  - London: 56 miles (90 km) NE
- Civil parish: Westbourne
- District: Chichester
- Shire county: West Sussex
- Region: South East
- Country: England
- Sovereign state: United Kingdom
- Post town: EMSWORTH
- Postcode district: PO10
- Dialling code: 01243
- Police: Sussex
- Fire: West Sussex
- Ambulance: South East Coast
- UK Parliament: Chichester
- Website: http://www.westbournevillage.org/

Westbourne is a village, civil parish and electoral ward in the Chichester District of West Sussex, England. It is located 0.5 miles (0.80 km) north east of Emsworth. The parish includes the hamlets of Woodmancote and Aldsworth, and once included the settlements of Southbourne and Prinsted to the south.

== Geography ==
The village stands on the River Ems, a small river flowing into Chichester Harbour at Emsworth. The River Ems was originally known as the Bourne with West Bourne traditionally marking the westernmost boundary of Sussex. The river was renamed by the 16th century chronicler Raphael Holinshed.

The Emille cometh first between Racton and Stansted, then down to Emilswort or Emmesworth, and so into the Ocean. Separating Sussex from Hampshire almost from the very head.

— Holinshed, Raphael (1807), Holinshed's Chronicles of England, Scotland, and Ireland, vol. 1, London: J.Johnson et al., p. 94

The parish covers an area of 1,846 acres (747 ha). The population of the village in 2011 is 2,309, 1,656 of whom are economically active, and who live in 1,000 households.

== Place name ==
Westbourne was noted as Borne and Burne in the Domesday book. By the 14th century it started to be called Westbourne to differentiate it from other ~bournes in the county.

== History ==
Westbourne contains 66 listed buildings some dating back to the 16th Century, though written evidence of habitation can be found in the Domesday Book of 1086. The medieval Church of St John the Baptist is notable for its fine yew avenue, which is apparently the oldest in England, and walled graveyard. Nicholas Levett, a native of Petworth and fellow of Balliol College, Oxford, was longtime minister of St John the Baptist. He was buried in Beckley, Oxfordshire, in 1687.

== Today ==
Commonside forms the northern edge of the village of Westbourne. This area is centred on a village pub called the Cricketers which is located near the village cricket pitch. There are two other public houses, the White Horse and the Stag's Head, both in The Square, at the centre of the oldest part of the village. Until 2010, a third pub called the Good Intent was open in North Street, but this has now closed and has been converted to a private home.

As of April 2011, the north-eastern and eastern edges of the village now form boundaries with the South Downs National Park.

== Governance ==
Westbourne is part of the Chichester constituency, a Liberal Democrat seat since 2024. The District Councillor is Roy Briscoe and the County Councillor is Andrew Kerry-Bedell.

== Notable residents ==
- On 16 May 1785, James Byden married Anne Silverlock at Westbourne, both parishioners, two of the sixteen great-great-grandparents of 46th US President Joe Biden; their second child, William Biden, great-grandfather of President Biden, was christened in Westbourne in 1789, became a stonemason, died aged 60 in 1849, buried at Loudon Park Cemetery in Baltimore, where the Bidens lived for several generations.
- George Sparkes (1845–1908), cricketer
- John Henry Mee (1852-1918), at The Chantry, Foxbury Lane. Mee was an Oxford composer, author and clergyman who was appointed Precentor of Chichester Cathedral in 1899.
- Tim Peake (1972–present), test pilot and astronaut (though not currently living in Westbourne)
