= Bourne (electoral division) =

Coordinates: 50.86220°N 0.90397°W

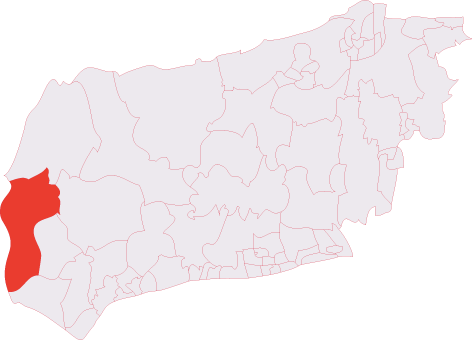
Bourne
Shown within West Sussex
District:	Chichester
UK Parliament Constituency:	Chichester
Ceremonial county:	West Sussex
Electorate (2021):	14,458
County Councillor
Andrew Kerry-Bedell (GIA)

Bourne is an electoral division of West Sussex in the United Kingdom, and returns one member to sit on West Sussex County Council. The current member Andrew Kerry-Bedell is now with the Green and Independent Alliance.

== Extent ==
The division covers the villages of Chidham, Compton, East Marden, Forestside, Lumley, Prinsted, Hambrook, North Marden, Nutbourne, Southbourne, Stoughton, Walderton, West Marden, Westbourne and Woodmancote, and the army base at Thorney Island.

It comprises the following civil parishes: Chidham & Hambrook, Compton, Southbourne, Stoughton and Westbourne. It also includes Thorney Island Baker Barracks (West Thorney is now no longer a parish), the base for 7th Air Defence Group, 16th and 12th Regiments.

== Election results ==
=== 2021 by-election ===
Results of the by-election held on 4 November 2021:

Bourne
Party	Candidate	Votes	%	±%
Liberal Democrats	Andrew Kerry-Bedell	1,180	52	16
Conservative	Bob Hayes	893	39	
Green	Ann Stewart	178	18	
Labour	Alan Butcher	25	1	
Majority		287		
Turnout		2,276	22	
Liberal Democrats gain from Conservative		Swing		

=== 2021 election ===
Results of the election held on 6 May 2021:

Bourne
Party	Candidate	Votes	%	±%
Conservative	Mike Magill	1,869	51	
Liberal Democrats	Andrew Kerry-Bedell	1,064	29	
Green	Ann Stewart	400	11	
Labour	Jane Towers	336	9	
Majority		805	1	
Turnout		3,669	37	
Conservative hold		Swing		

=== 2019 by-election ===
Results of the by-election held on 21 November 2019:

Bourne
Party	Candidate	Votes	%	±%
Conservative	Mike Magill	1,368	49	
Liberal Democrats	Andrew Kerry-Bedell	1,009	36	
Green	Micheal Neville	250	9	
Labour	Jane Towers	161	6	
Patria	Andrew Emerson	12	0	
Majority		359		
Turnout		2,800	29	
Conservative hold		Swing		

=== 2017 election ===
Results of the election held on 4 May 2017:

Bourne
Party	Candidate	Votes	%	±%
Conservative	Viral Parikh	1,241	40	
UKIP	Sandra James	865	26	
Liberal Democrats	Rachel Keys	659	20	
Labour	Jane Towers	264	8	
Green	Sandra James	234	7	
Majority		376		
Turnout		3,379		
Conservative gain from UKIP		Swing		

=== 2013 election ===
Results of the election held on 2 May 2013:

Bourne
Party	Candidate	Votes	%	±%
UKIP	Sandra James	1,241	40.6	N/A
Conservative	Mark Dunn	1,158	37.9	−18.4
Liberal Democrats	Jonathan Brown	360	11.8	−28.2
Labour	Theo Child	295	9.7	+6.0
Majority		83	2.7	+2.7
Turnout		3,054	31.8	−5.3
UKIP gain from Conservative		Swing		

=== 2009 election ===
Results of the election held on 4 June 2009:

Bourne
Party	Candidate	Votes	%	±%
Conservative	Mark Dunn	1,948	56.3	+15.7
Liberal Democrats	Philip MacDougall	1,382	40.0	+7.2
Labour	Janet Miller	127	3.7	−10.6
Majority		566	16.3	+8.6
Turnout		3,457	37.1	−28.5
Conservative hold		Swing		

=== 2005 election ===
Results of the election held on 5 May 2005:

Bourne
Party	Candidate	Votes	%	±%
Conservative	Mr T M E Dunn	2,377	40.5	
Liberal Democrats	Mr R A Gowlett	1,922	32.8	
Labour	Mr J Baker	841	14.3	
Independent	Mrs C H Phillips	375	6.4	
UKIP	Mrs A R Denny	347	5.9	
Majority		455	7.7	
Turnout		5,862	65.6	
Conservative win (new seat)				
