= Nutbourne, Chichester =

Village in West Sussex, England

Coordinates: 50.8429°N 0.88195°W

Nutbourne
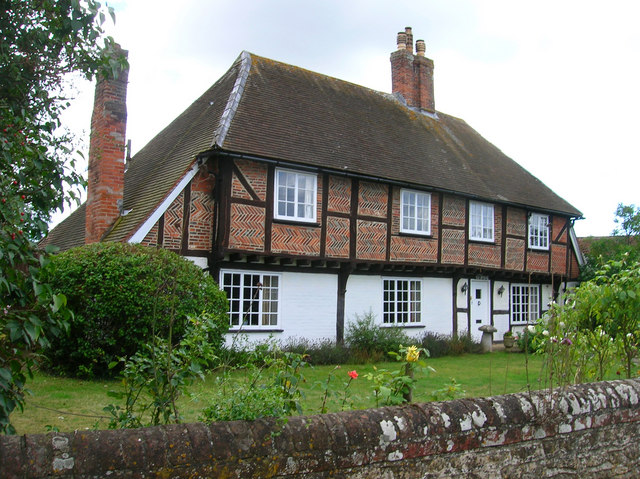
- A 16th century cottage in Nutbourne

- Location within West Sussex
- OS grid reference: SU788054
- Civil parish: Southbourne; Chidham and Hambrook
- District: Chichester
- Shire county: West Sussex
- Region: South East
- Country: England
- Sovereign state: United Kingdom
- Post town: Chichester
- Postcode district: PO18
- Police: Sussex
- Fire: West Sussex
- Ambulance: South East Coast
- UK Parliament: Chichester

Nutbourne is a village in the Chichester District of West Sussex, England located 2 miles (3.2 km) east of Emsworth on the A259 road. It is in the civil parishes of Southbourne and Chidham and Hambrook.

This small village on the south side of the former A27 road, now the A259, has a loop of road running through it with a ford on the south side of the village centre. It lies at the northern tip of Thorney Channel, an inlet of Chichester Harbour.

== Place name ==
Nutbourne probably takes its name from a stream that discharges into the Thorney Channel. It was known to the South Saxons as hnutu burna- the stream overhung by nut trees.

== History ==
Nutbourne was formed from a part of the area previously known as the Manor of Bourne. In 1256, the overlordship of Nutbourne Manor was assigned to Robert de Tateshall, and half a century later came under the ownership of Thomas de Cailli after the Tateshall estates were divided. It eventually passed into royal ownership.

A 17th century Hearth Tax register listed Nutbourne as having twenty-four households in total. By 1840, Nutbourne contained a number of allotments as well as a shop. A tide mill was present in Nutbourne by the 19th century.

In 1905, a Methodist chapel was opened in the village with the ability to seat 158 people. The chapel was closed in 1998.

In 1996, The Bell and Anchor pub was closed and replaced by residential properties. In 2025, plans to build additional homes in the village were deferred due to concerns around the capacity of the nearby Thornham Wastewater Treatment Works.

== Amenities ==
Nutbourne contains a café named Mamawu which opened in 2022. The village also contains a Church of England named St. Wilfrid's.

== See also ==
- Nutbourne railway station
