= Southbourne railway station =

Railway station in West Sussex, England

Coordinates: 50.848°N 0.908°W

Southbourne
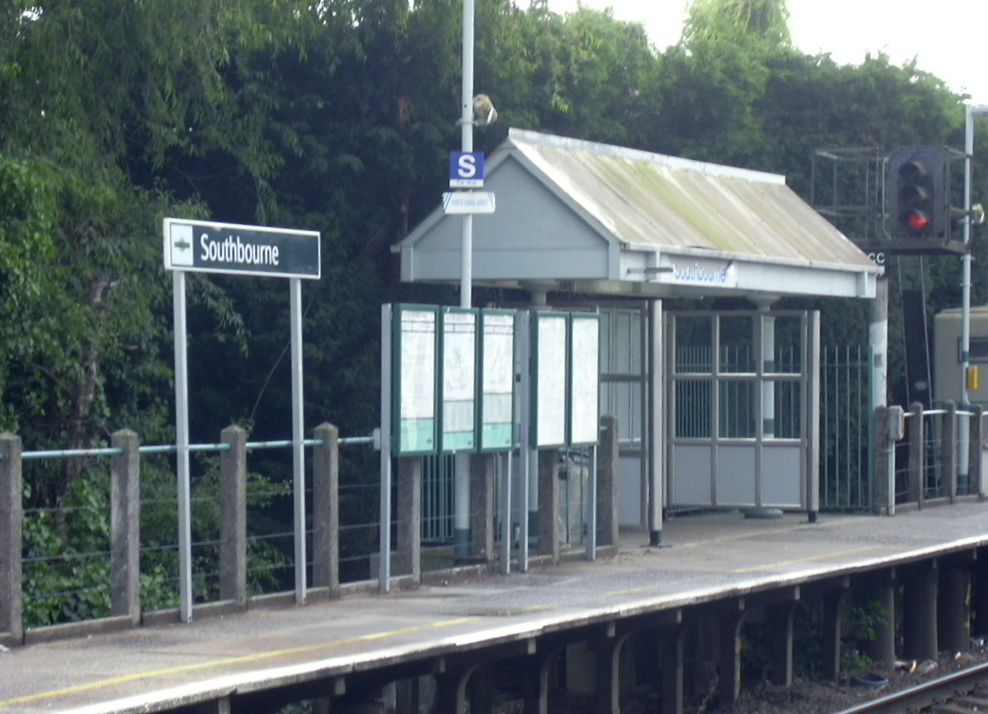

General information
- Location: Southbourne, Chichester; England
- Grid reference: SU769059
- Managed by: Southern
- Platforms: 2

Other information
- Station code: SOB
- Classification: DfT category E

Key dates
- 1 April 1906: Opened (Southbourne Halt)
- 5 May 1969: Renamed (Southbourne)

Passengers
- 2020/21: ▼77,860
- 2021/22: ▲0.175 million
- 2022/23: ▲0.182 million
- 2023/24: ▼0.181 million
- 2024/25: ▲0.229 million
Location
Notes
- Passenger statistics from the Office of Rail & Road

Southbourne railway station serves the village of Southbourne, West Sussex, England. It is on the West Coastway Line between Brighton and Southampton, 34 miles 16 chains (34.20 miles, 55.04 km) from Brighton.

It was originally opened in 1906, when it was called Southbourne Halt.

== Facilities ==
The station has a ticket office which is staffed throughout the week on weekday and Saturday mornings and early afternoons (06:40-13:10). At other times, the station is unstaffed and tickets can be purchased from the self-service ticket machine during these times. Both platforms have seated areas and modern help points available.

Step-free access is available to both the platforms at Southbourne.

== Services ==
All services at Southbourne are operated by Southern using 377 EMUs.

The typical off-peak service in trains per hour is:

- 2 tph to London Victoria via Horsham
- 2 tph to Brighton via Worthing
- 2 tph to Southampton Central
- 2 tph to Portsmouth Harbour

Preceding station	National Rail	Following station
Nutbourne	Southern West Coastway Line	Emsworth
Chichester	Southern West Coastway Line	Emsworth

Until May 2022, one Great Western Railway service from Portsmouth Harbour to Brighton called at Southbourne.
