= West Thorney =

Village and parish in West Sussex, England

Coordinates: 50.81587°N 0.91041°W

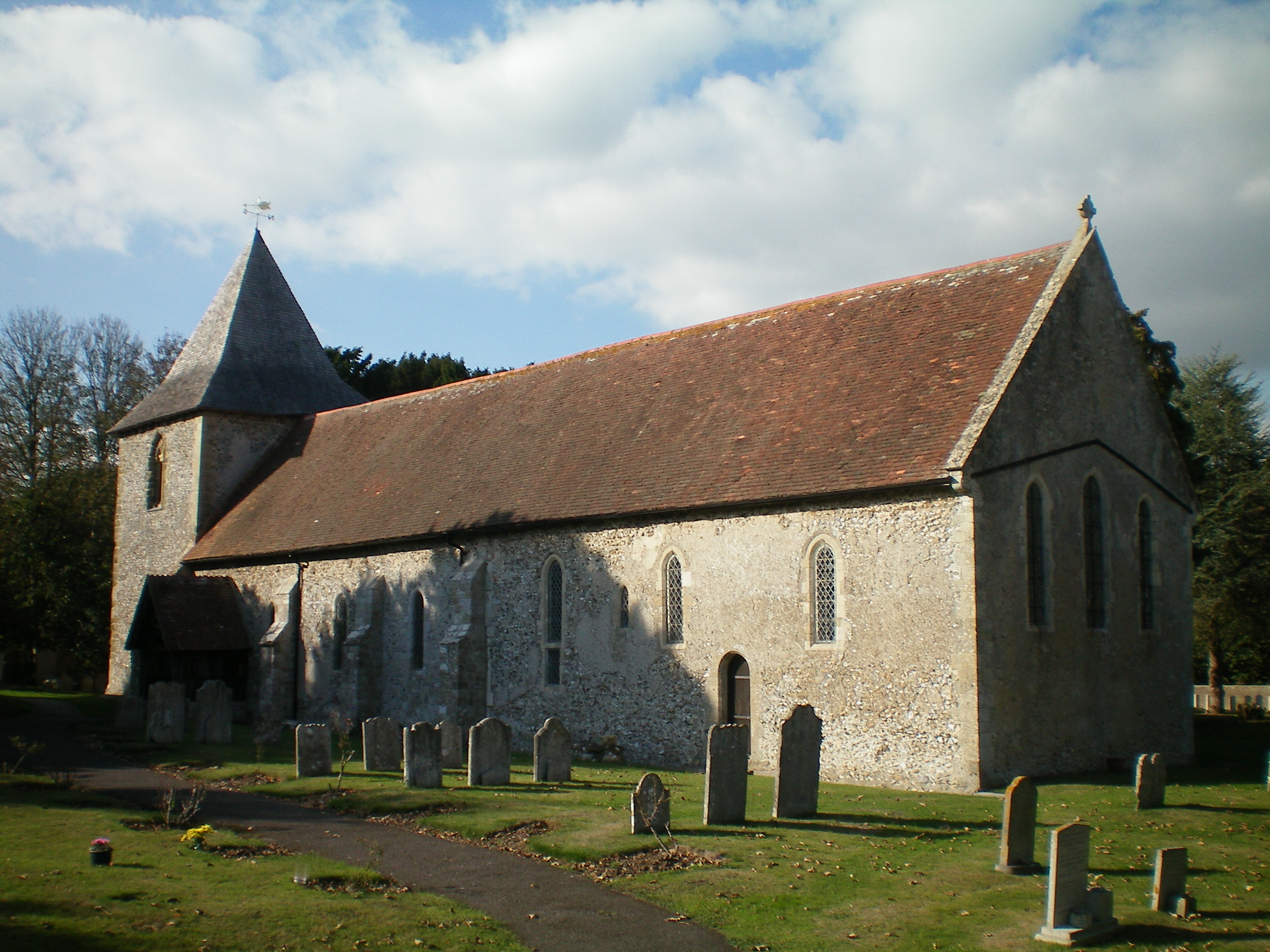
- West Thorney Church

- Location within West Sussex
- Area: 12.23 km^{2} (4.72 sq mi)
- Population: 1,183. 2011 Census
  - Density: 88/km^{2} (230/sq mi)
- OS grid reference: SU768023
  - London: 59 miles (95 km) NE
- Civil parish: West Thorney
- District: Chichester
- Shire county: West Sussex
- Region: South East
- Country: England
- Sovereign state: United Kingdom
- Post town: EMSWORTH
- Postcode district: PO10
- Dialling code: 01243
- Police: Sussex
- Fire: West Sussex
- Ambulance: South East Coast
- UK Parliament: Chichester

West Thorney was a village and civil parish on Thorney Island in the Chichester district of West Sussex, England, located nine kilometres (5.6 miles) west of Chichester south of the A27 road. The village was demolished after the Air Ministry requisitioned the island during the second world war and was replaced by housing and infrastructure for military families. Just to the south is the smaller Pilsey Island, a haven for birds. The island was a World War II airfield RAF Thorney Island which remained in use until 1976. Since 1982 the base has been used by the Royal Artillery. Only the church and coastal footpath are open to the public. It is necessary to give one's name and address by intercom to be allowed through remotely controlled gates. The parish has a land area of 1,223 hectares (3,020 acres). In the 2001 census 1079 people lived in 217 households, of whom 679 were economically active. At the 2011 Census the population was 1,183.

== The parish church ==
The Anglican parish church is dedicated to St Nicholas, the patron saint of sailors. The original building dates from around 1100 A.D. probably on the orders of Bishop Warlewast.

== History ==
The Manor of Thorney belonged to the chapelry of Bosham at the Norman Conquest and was held by the Bishops of Exeter. In 1086 A.D. the Domesday Book recorded that 'Mauger holds of the land of this church 12 hides as one manor; it is called Tornei and pays geld for 8 hides'. It was sold by the Bishop of Exeter in 1548 to Thomas Fisher, who the following year sold it to Henry Bickley.

== Landmarks ==
Chichester Harbour, a Site of Special Scientific Interest is partly within the parish. This is a wetland of international importance, a Special Protection Area for wild birds and a Special Area of Conservation. The harbour is of particular importance for wintering wildfowl and waders of which five species reach numbers which are internationally important.

== Pilsey Island ==
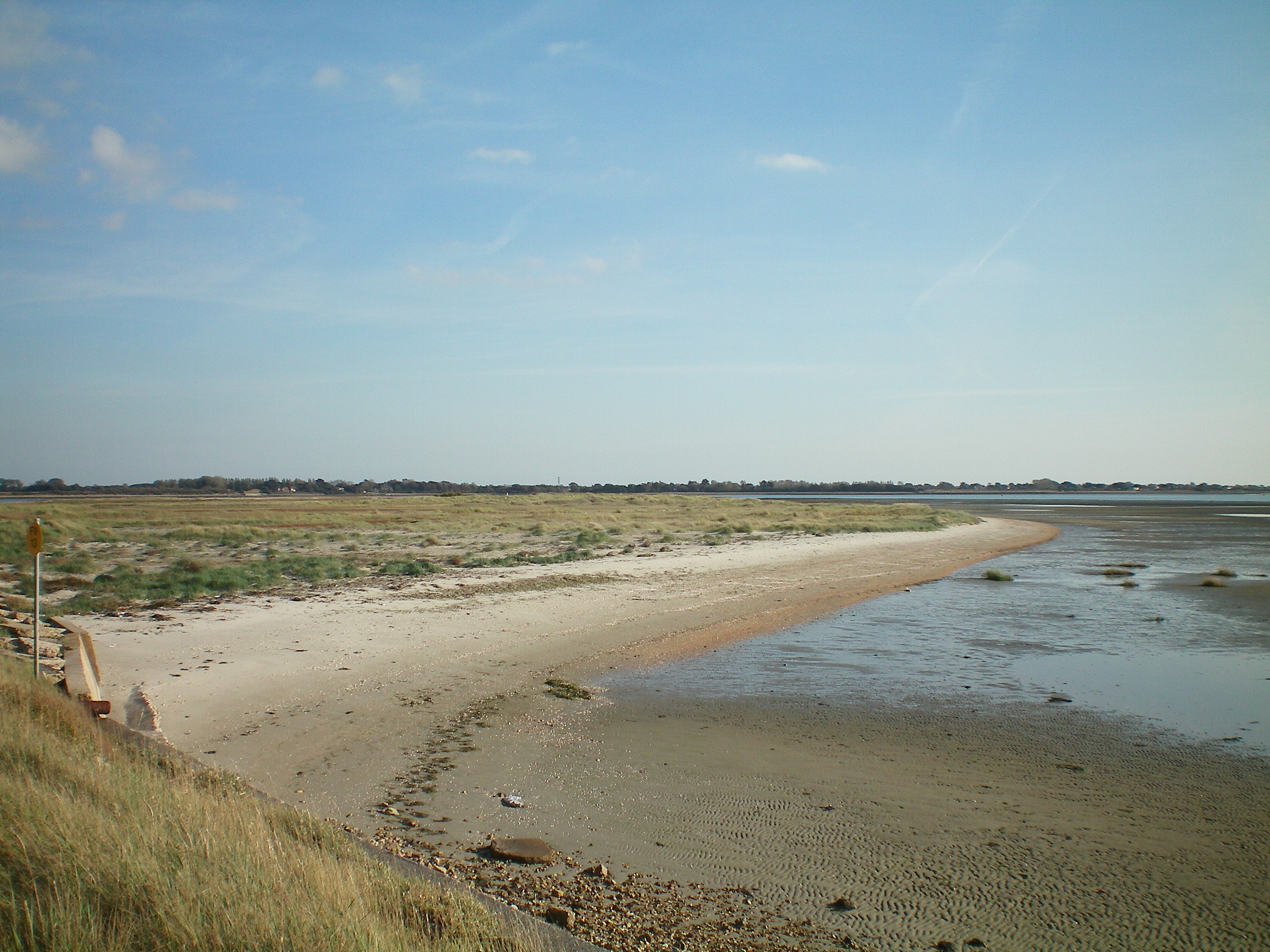
Pilsey Island seen from the Thorney Island sea wall

Pilsey Island is a small island in Chichester Harbour, just off the south eastern tip of Thorney Island. The island is an RSPB nature reserve and a designated Local Nature Reserve.
