= Fishbourne railway station =

Railway station in West Sussex, England

Coordinates: 50.839°N 0.815°W

Fishbourne
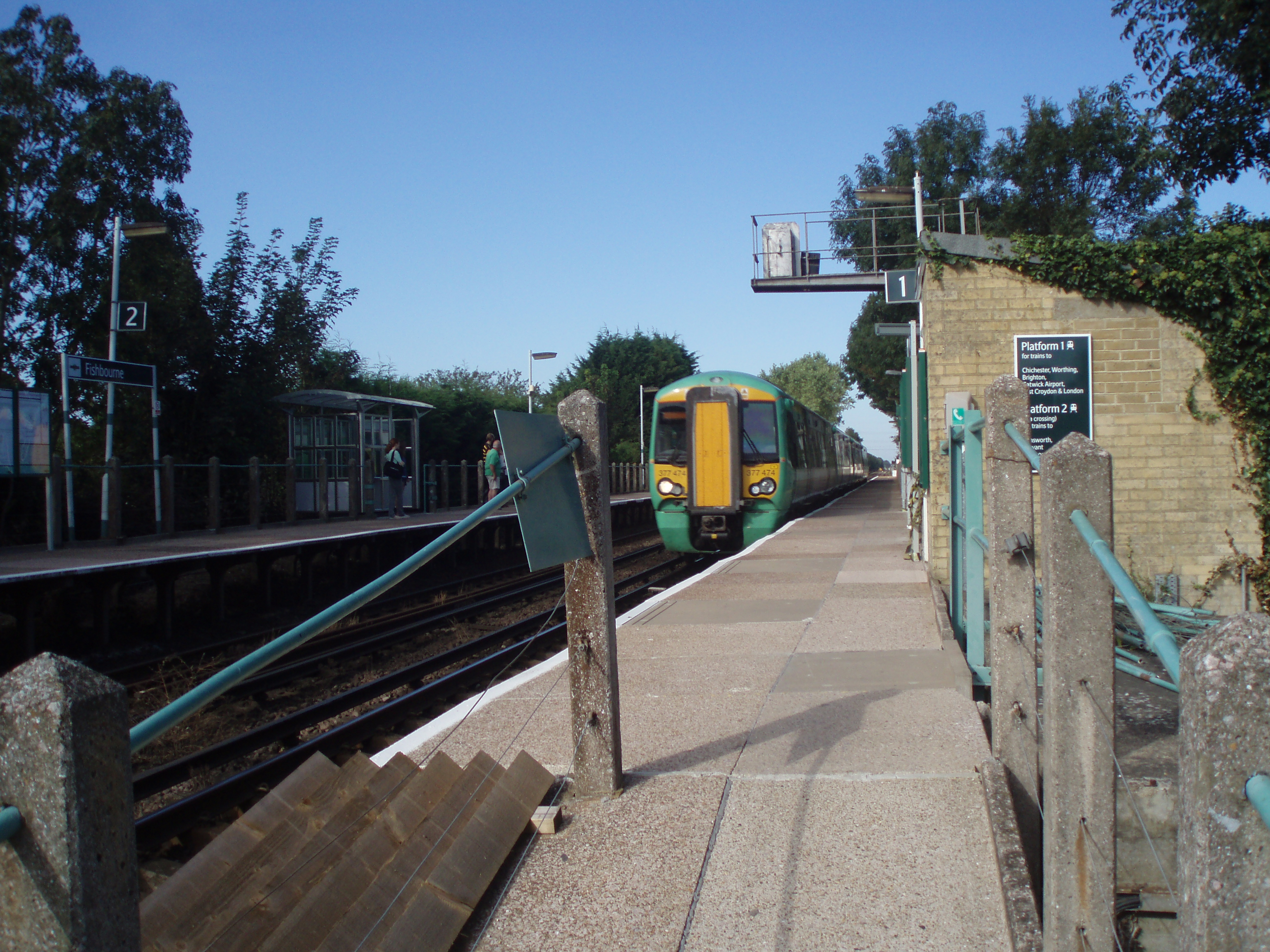
- A train about to depart for Chichester

General information
- Location: Fishbourne, Chichester; England
- Grid reference: SU835050
- Managed by: Southern
- Platforms: 2

Other information
- Station code: FSB
- Classification: DfT category F1

Key dates
- 1 April 1906: Opened

Passengers
- 2020/21: ▼25,782
- 2021/22: ▲58,254
- 2022/23: ▲58,972
- 2023/24: ▼57,718
- 2024/25: ▲67,938
Location
Notes
- Passenger statistics from the Office of Rail and Road

Fishbourne railway station serves the village of Fishbourne, West Sussex, England. It is 30 miles 12 chains (30.15 miles, 48.52 km) from Brighton.

The London, Brighton and South Coast Railway (LB&SCR) opened the station at Fishbourne on 1 April 1906. It is located on the West Coastway Line that runs between Brighton and Southampton. The station is roughly half a mile walk from Fishbourne Roman Palace. Just east of this station at Fishbourne Crossing the single track veered off for the branch line between Chichester and Midhurst.

== Facilities ==
Fishbourne station is unstaffed and tickets must be purchased from the self-service ticket machine at the station entrance. The station has seated areas and passenger help points on both platforms.

Step-free access is available to both platforms at the station.

== Services ==
All services at Fishbourne are operated by Southern using Class 377 EMUs.

The typical off-peak service in trains per hour is:

- 1 tph to London Victoria via Horsham
- 1 tph to Portsmouth Harbour

Additional services, including trains to and from Brighton via Worthing call at the station during the peak hours.

On Sundays, eastbound services run to and from Brighton instead of London Victoria.

Preceding station	National Rail	Following station
Chichester	Southern West Coastway Line	Bosham

== Gallery ==
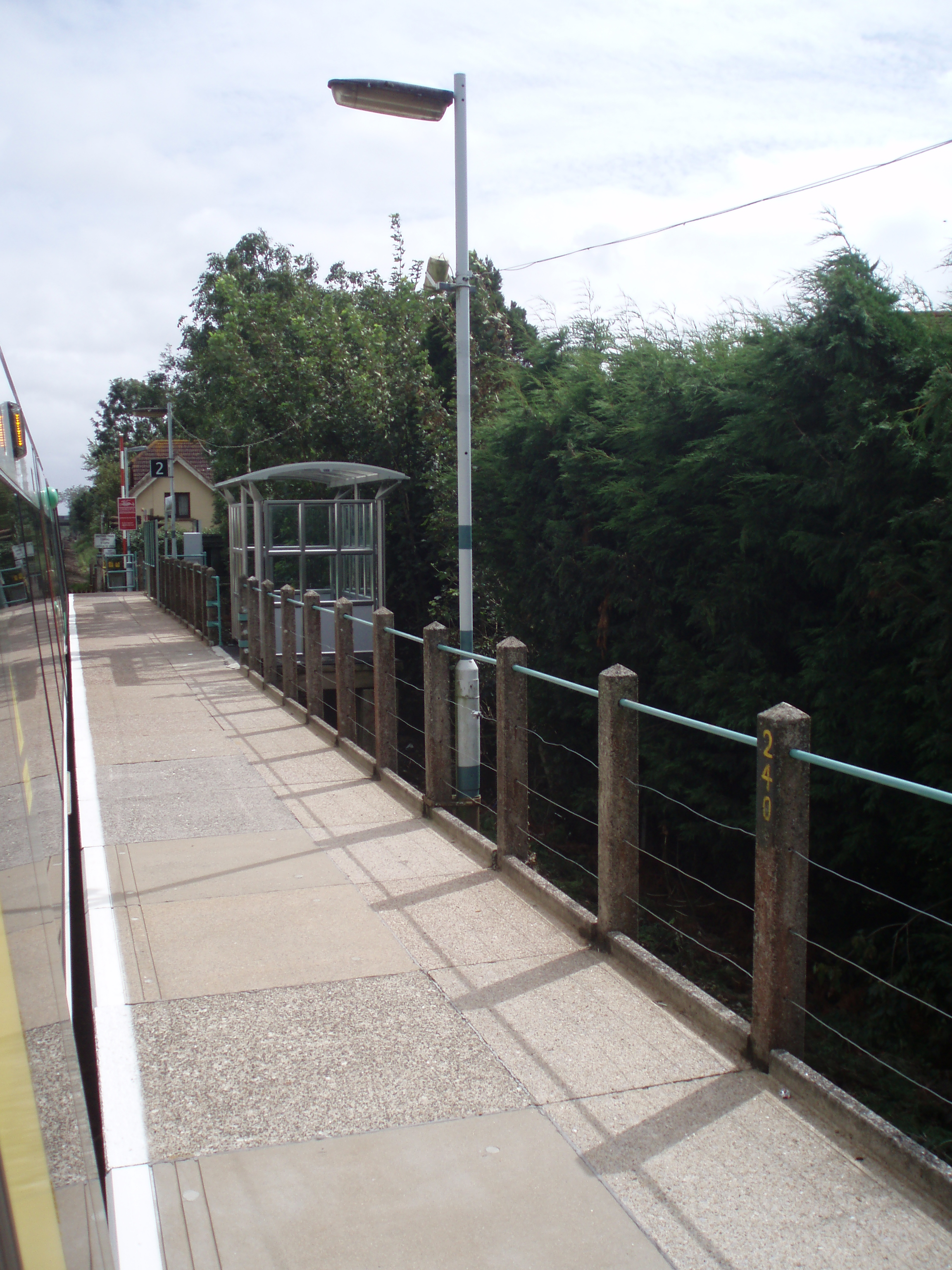

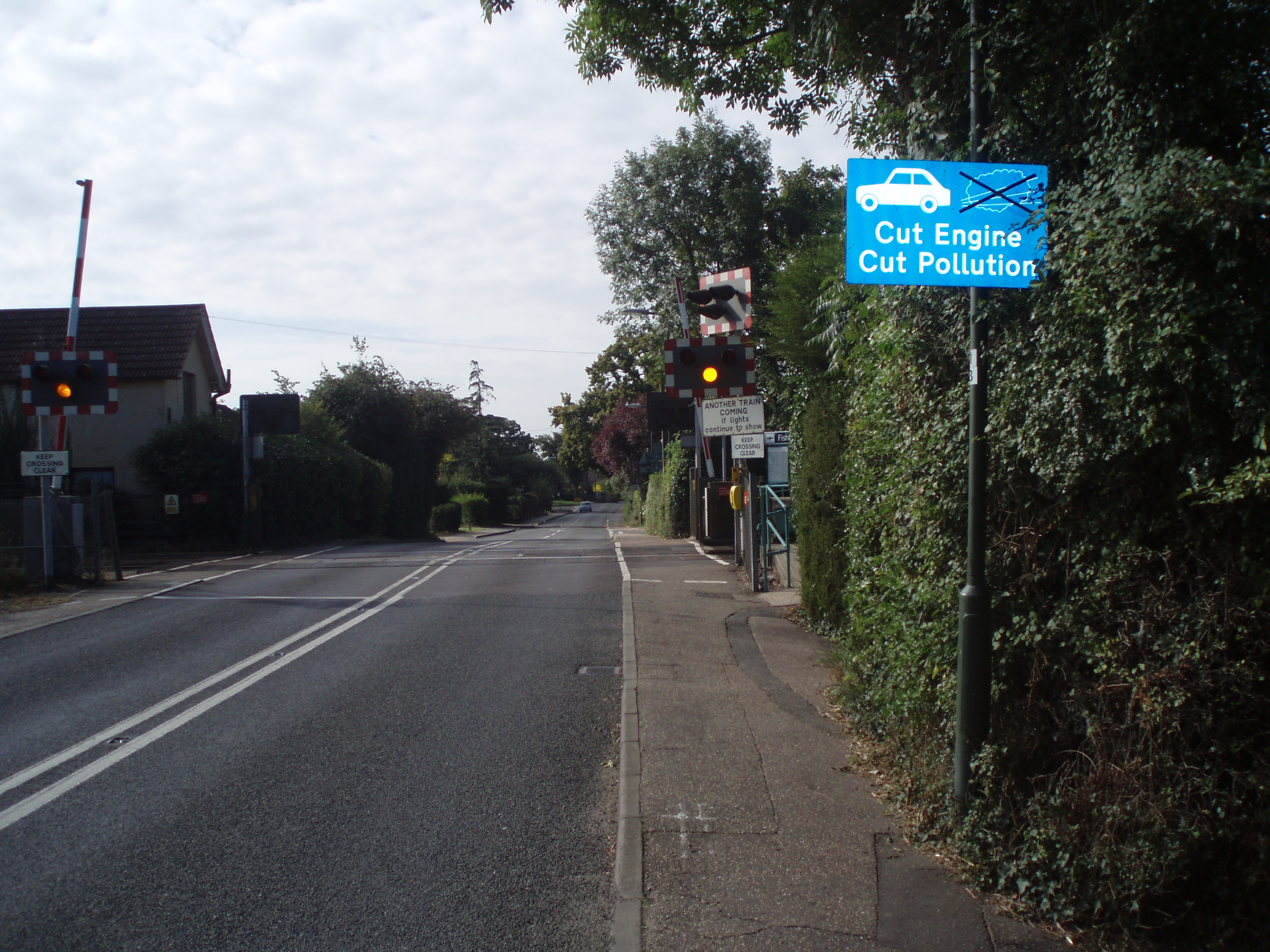

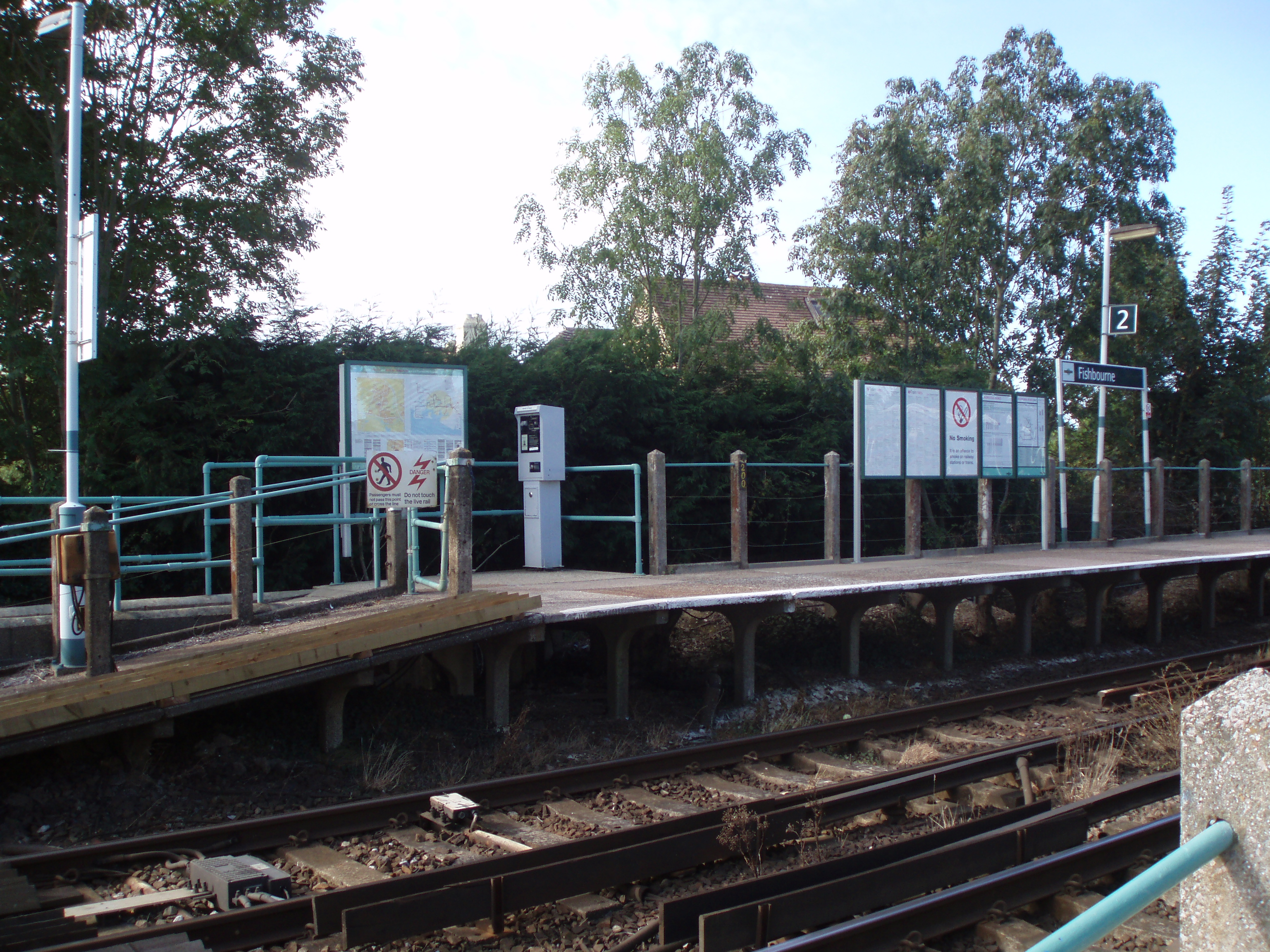

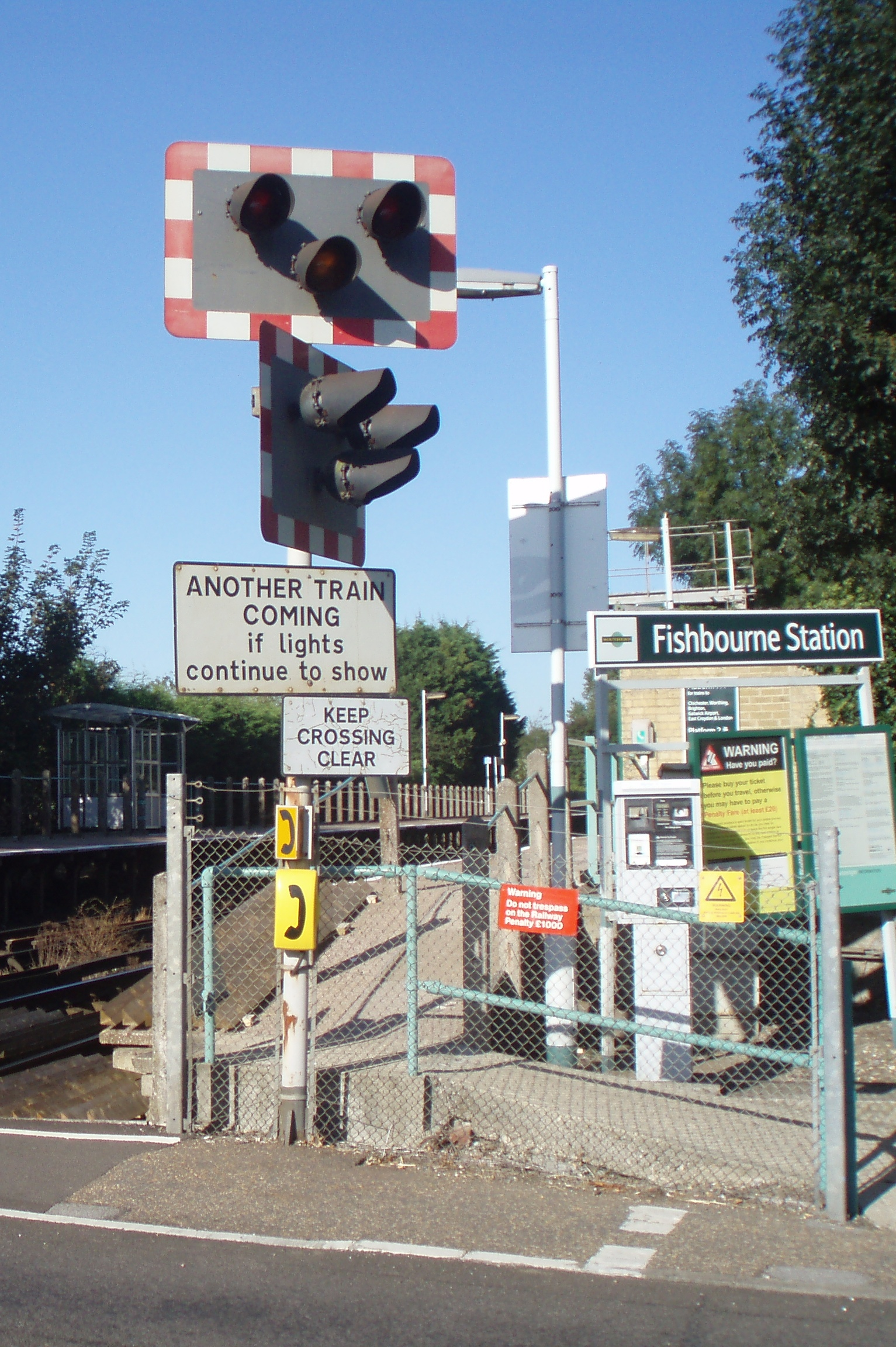

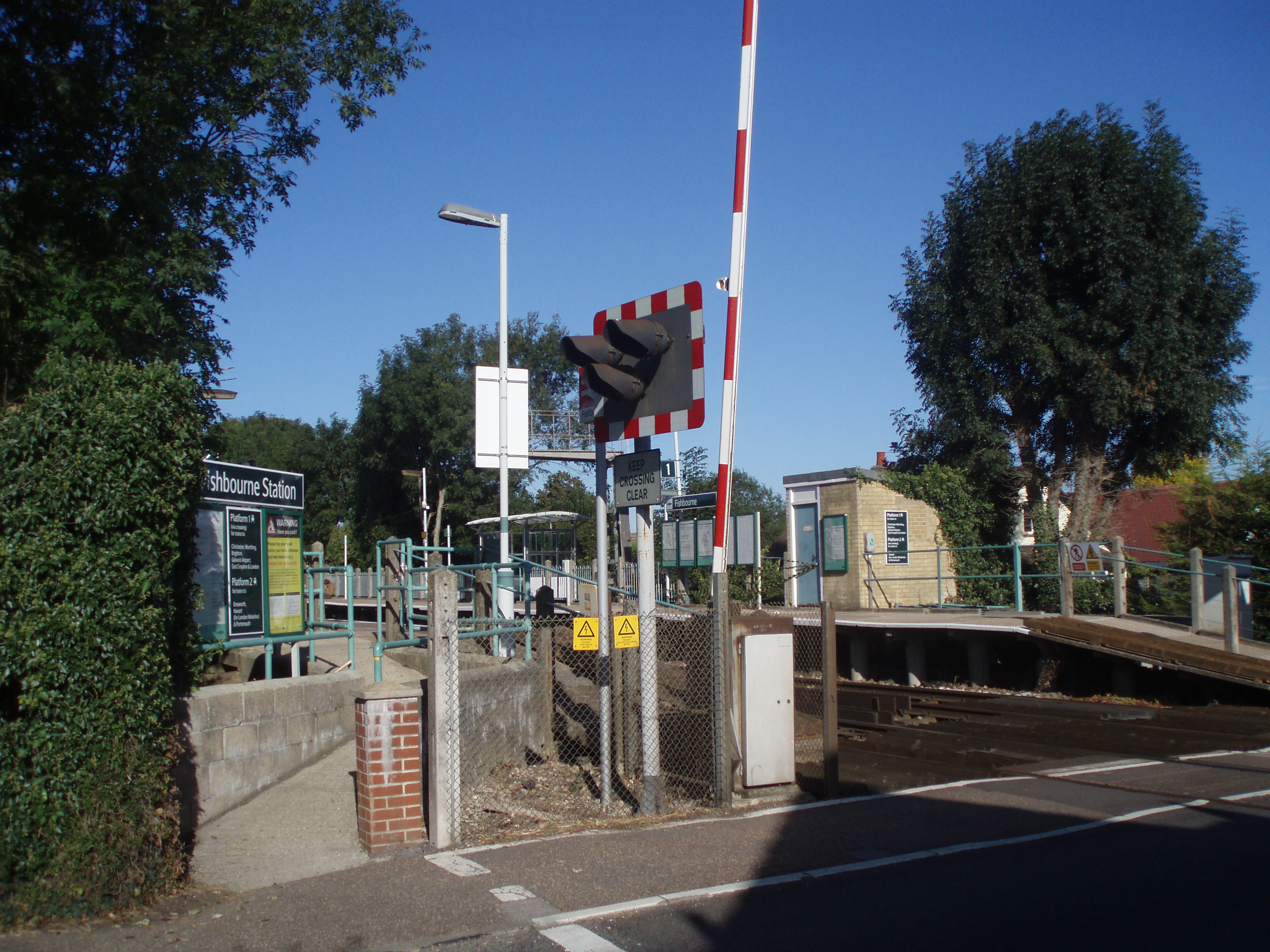
Station entrance

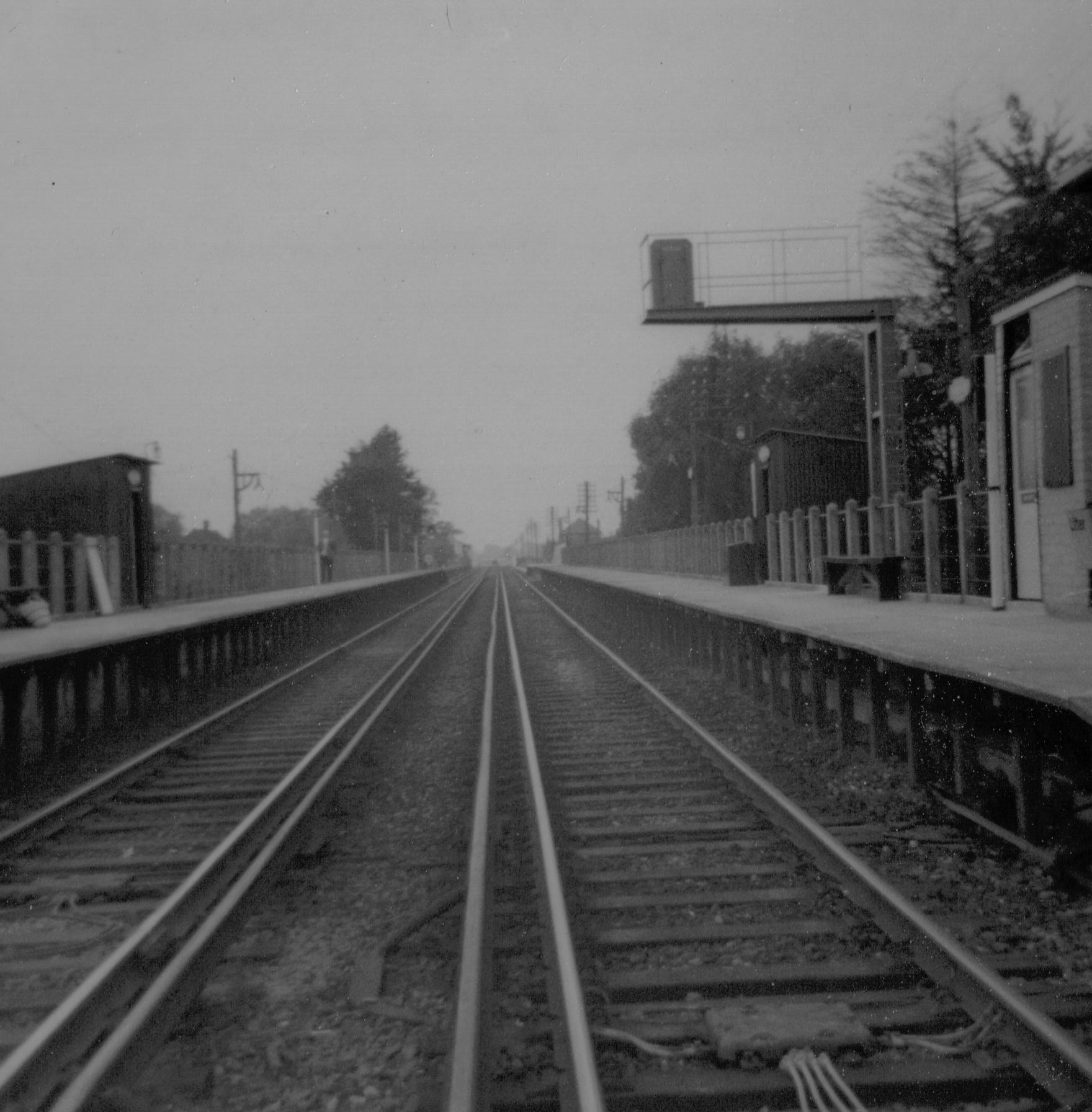
Fishbourne Halt in 1969.

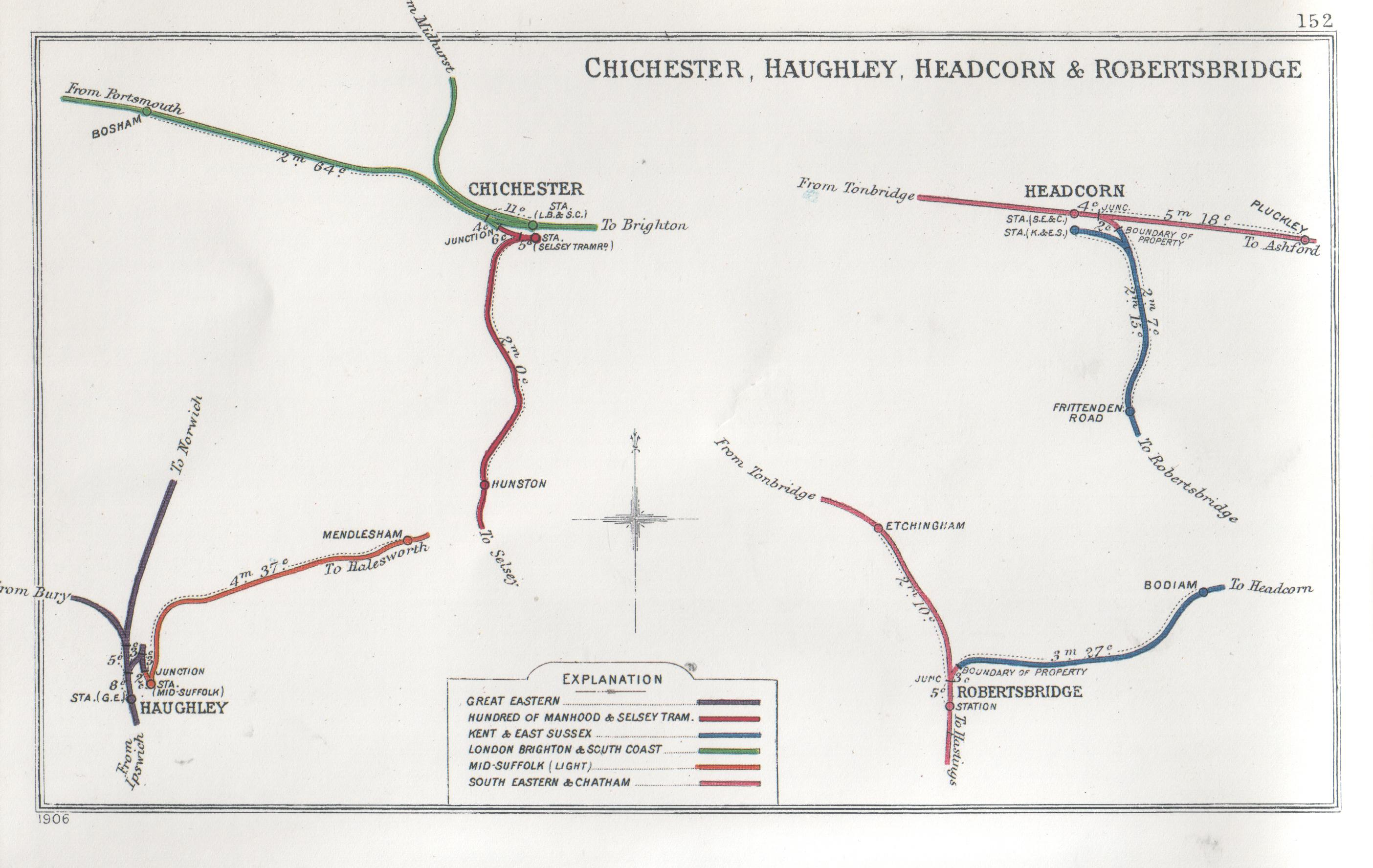
A 1914 Railway Clearing House map of lines around Fishbourne railway station.
