= Bosham railway station =

Railway station in West Sussex, England

Coordinates: 50°50′34″N 0°50′50″W

Bosham
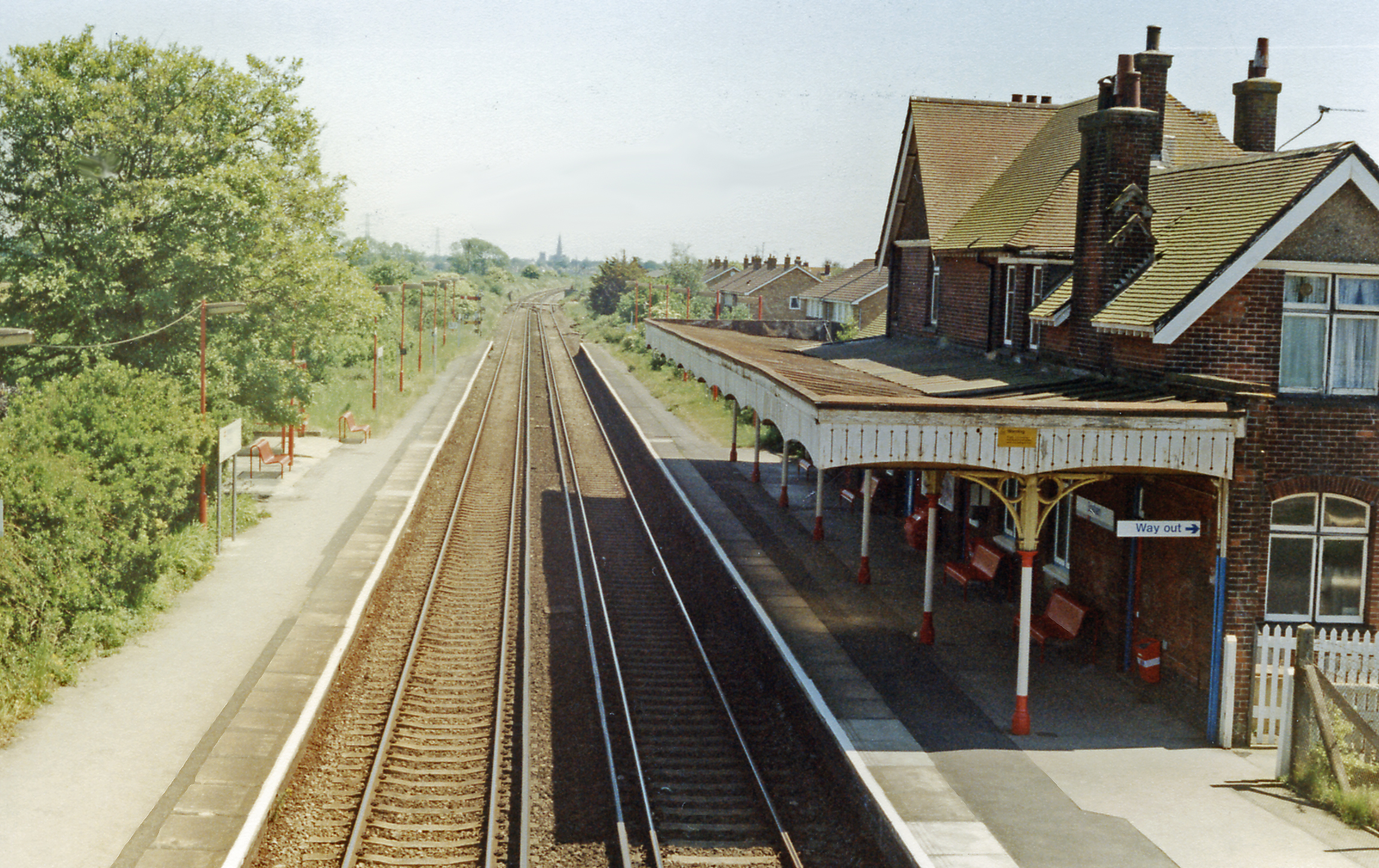

General information
- Location: Bosham, Chichester; England
- Grid reference: SU812054
- Manager: Southern
- Platforms: 2

Other information
- Station code: BOH
- Classification: DfT category E

History
- Opened: 15 March 1847

Passengers
- 2020/21: ▼22,890
- 2021/22: ▲48,246
- 2022/23: ▲59,204
- 2023/24: ▲62,116
- 2024/25: ▲69,330
Location
Notes
- Passenger statistics from the Office of Rail and Road

Bosham railway station serves the small village of Bosham in West Sussex, England. It is located on the West Coastway Line that runs between Brighton and Southampton, 31 miles 43 chains (31.54 miles, 50.75 km) from Brighton.

== Services ==
All services at Bosham are operated by Southern using Class 377 EMUs.

The typical off-peak service in trains per hour is:

- 1 tph to London Victoria via Horsham
- 1 tph to Portsmouth Harbour

Additional services, including trains to and from Brighton via Worthing call at the station during the peak hours.

On Sundays, eastbound services run to and from Brighton instead of London Victoria.

Preceding station	National Rail	Following station
Fishbourne	Southern West Coastway Line	Nutbourne
