= Southbourne, West Sussex =

Village and parish in West Sussex, England

Coordinates: 50.84503°N 0.90811°W

Southbourne
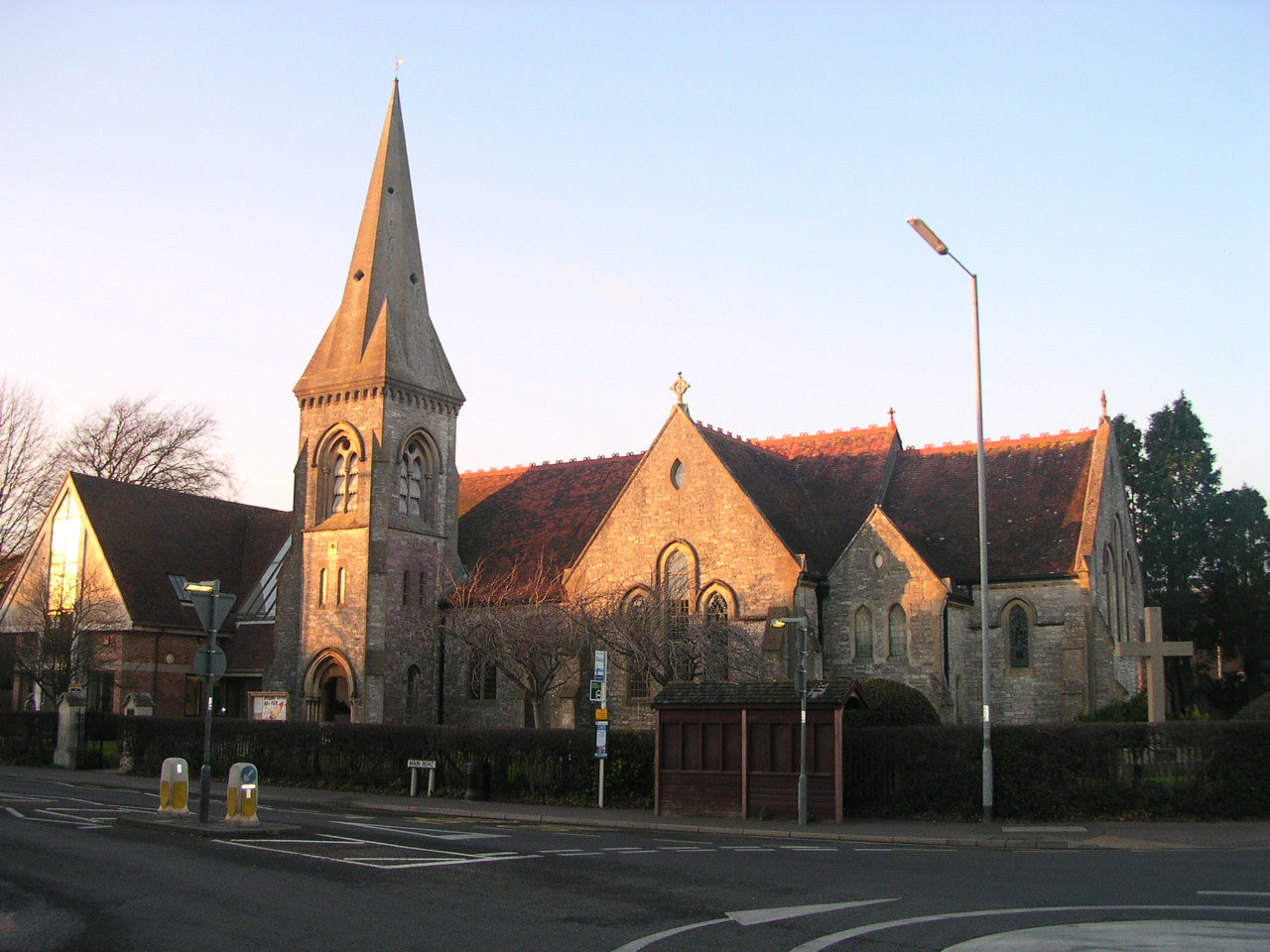
- St. John's Church

- Location within West Sussex
- Area: 10.68 km^{2} (4.12 sq mi)
- Population: 6,265. 2011 Census
  - Density: 562/km^{2} (1,460/sq mi)
- OS grid reference: SU769056
  - London: 57 miles (92 km) NE
- Civil parish: Southbourne
- District: Chichester
- Shire county: West Sussex
- Region: South East
- Country: England
- Sovereign state: United Kingdom
- Post town: EMSWORTH
- Postcode district: PO10
- Dialling code: 01243
- Police: Sussex
- Fire: West Sussex
- Ambulance: South East Coast
- UK Parliament: Chichester

Southbourne is a village created in 1876 with the consecration of St. Johns church. The civil parish which covers a larger area is in the Chichester district of West Sussex, England created in 1968. It lies to the east of the Hampshire County Border at Emsworth, the west of Chidham (recently the boundary has been changed) and south-east of Westbourne. Southbourne parish comprises Lumley, Hermitage, Thornham, Prinsted and part of Nutbourne.

== Statistics ==
The parish has a land area of 1068.36 hectares (2639 acres). In the 2011 census 6261 people lived in 2595 households of whom 2762 were economically active. The Parish are undertaking a Neighbourhood Plan and are having to accommodate 350 dwellings within its boundary between 2014 and 2029.

== Geography ==
Southbourne is located on the western corner of West Sussex, it borders the county of Hampshire to its west and Nutbourne to its east.

It has a small railway station on the West Coastway Line between Southampton and Brighton. Southbourne has a separate Infant School and Junior School and is home to Bourne Community College, which takes secondary pupils from around the area and Thorney Island Primary School. Bourne Leisure centre and a Library both serve surrounding villages and settlements. Our Age Concern and Southbourne Bowls and Social Club are both in New Road. The A259 road, formerly designated A27 and the main coast route until the construction of a new dual carriageway, runs through the village.

The village encompasses various residential areas and an industrial estate populated mainly with metal work outlets. There are various local shops along the Main Road and Stein Road. The area South of the Main Road with access to Chichester Harbour is known as Prinsted. It has a conservation area with a number of thatched roof properties.

There are two public houses the Sussex Brewery to the west of the village and the Travellers Joy in the centre. Both are on the Main Road, A259, which is the old road linking Chichester with Portchester, both of which were Roman settlements.

== History ==
Previously part of Westbourne the first mention of Southbourne is Southbourne Council School in 1876, which had previously been Prinsted Board School.

At one time this small area of Sussex had 4 flour mills. Slipper and Lumley in the west and Nutbourne in the east were all tidal mills. Gosden Green was a windmill.

An American Aerodrome was built in WW1, but never used. This is now the site of Bourne Community College.

St John's Church was consecrated in May 1876 and has a western stained glass window dedicated to Nathaniel Frary Miller, American businessman and grandfather of author Agatha Christie. There is no record of her visit, but her step grandmother (Margaret West) owned Fraryhurst until her own death, in 1909.

== Governance ==
An electoral ward in the same name exists. The ward includes West Thorney with at the 2011 census a total population of 7,448.

== Landmarks ==
Chichester Harbour, a Site of Special Scientific Interest is partly within the parish. This is a wetland of international importance,a Special Protection Area for wild birds and a Special Area of Conservation. The harbour is of particular importance for wintering wildfowl and waders of which five species reach numbers which are internationally important.

== Villages ==
Other villages in the parish include: Slipper, Lumley, Hermitage, Thornham, Prinsted and part of Nutbourne. Thorney Island is in the Parish but administered by the MOD. St.Nicholas Church, Thorney comes under the St. Johns, Southbourne and Chichester Diocese. It is a Saxon church with a small cemetery.
