= Chichester Harbour =

Harbour and protected area in West Sussex, England

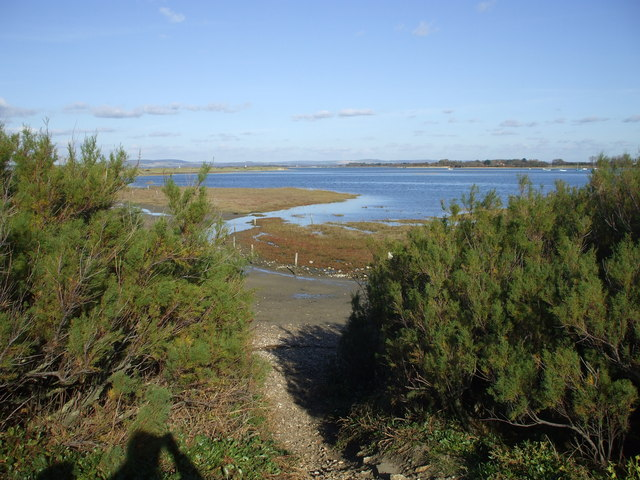
- View of the harbour from West Wittering

- Location: West Sussex, England; Hampshire, England
- Established: 1964 (AONB)
- Website: https://www.conservancy.co.uk

Chichester Harbour is a large natural harbour in West Sussex and Hampshire. It is situated to the south-west of the city of Chichester and to the north of the Solent. The harbour and surrounding land has been designated as an Area of Outstanding Natural Beauty (AONB) and a biological and geological Site of Special Scientific Interest (SSSI). The area is also part of the Solent Maritime Special Area of Conservation, Chichester and Langstone Harbours Ramsar site, Special Protection Area and Nature Conservation Review site, Grade I. Part of it is a Geological Conservation Review site and two areas are Local Nature Reserves.

Five institutional landowners that own land or foreshore within Chichester Harbour SSSI include the Crown Estate, the Church Commissioners, the Ministry of Defence (around Thorney island), the National Trust (East Head) and the Royal Society for the Protection of Birds (Pilsey Island).

Chichester Harbour is a 3,733.5-hectare (9,226-acre) area that is managed by Chichester Harbour Conservancy, an independent public body that was established by an act of Parliament in 1971.

== Description ==
Chichester Harbour is one of four natural harbours in that area of the coastline, the others being Portsmouth Harbour, Langstone Harbour and Pagham Harbour. It is one of the few remaining undeveloped coastal areas in Southern England and remains relatively wild. Its wide expanses and intricate creeks are at the same time a major wildlife haven and among some of Britain's most popular boating waters.

The massive stretch of tidal flats and saltings are of outstanding ecological significance. Very large populations of wildfowl and waders use the mudflats feeding on the rich plant life and the huge populations of intertidal invertebrates. More than 7,500 Brent geese overwinter on the intertidal mud-land and adjacent farmland and around 55,000 birds reside in or visit the Harbour throughout the year.

The harbour is one of the south coast's most popular sailing waters with as many as 12,500 craft regularly using the harbour, with competitive racing taking place among the 14 sailing clubs of the Chichester Harbour Federation. The villages, sea walls and footpaths are a popular leisure area for residents and tourists alike.

Chichester Harbour Conservancy Act 1971
- Act of Parliament
- Parliament of the United Kingdom
- Long title: An Act to incorporate the Chichester Harbour Conservancy; to transfer to that Conservancy the harbour undertakings of the mayor, aldermen and citizens of the city of Chichester and the urban district council of Havant and Waterloo; to confer powers on that Conservancy; to enact provisions in connection with the matters aforesaid; and for other purposes.
- Citation: 1971 c. lxx

Dates
- Royal assent: 5 August 1971

Text of statute as originally enacted

Set up by the Chichester Harbour Conservancy Act 1971 (c. lxx), Chichester Harbour Conservancy has the duty to conserve, maintain and improve the harbour and amenity area for recreation, natural conservation and natural beauty. As well as being the statutory harbour authority, the Conservancy manages the Area of Outstanding Natural Beauty (AONB).

To the south west of the entrance to Chichester Harbour is Chichester Bar, a shallow spit which can present a significant navigation hazard at all states of the tide. The entrance to the harbour is deep with a fast tidal stream and to the east of the main harbour entrance channel is a gravel bank known as The Winner.

The east side of the harbour entrance is an area of geographical, recreational and conservation interest known as East Head. It is a large sand dune linked to land by a narrow area known as The Hinge. In recent years, The Hinge has been breached by several storms and then repaired. There is much debate about whether and how it should continue to be repaired.

The western boundary with Langstone Harbour is defined by a historic causeway known as the wade way, once the principal access from Hayling Island to the mainland, but since bisected by a deep channel for the Portsmouth and Chichester Canal in the 1820s, and no longer safely traversable.

Chichester Harbour has three main channels. The Emsworth Channel, the Thorney Channel and the Chichester Channel, which also branches off into the Bosham Lake and Itchenor Reach.

=== Harbour villages ===
The harbourside settlements are: Birdham, Bosham, Chidham, Dell Quay, Emsworth, Fishbourne, Langstone, Northney, South Hayling, Southbourne, West Itchenor, West Thorney and West Wittering. The nearest towns are Chichester and Havant. The harbour lowlands contain high quality arable farmland. Boatyards, marinas and commercial fishing are important elements of the local economy.

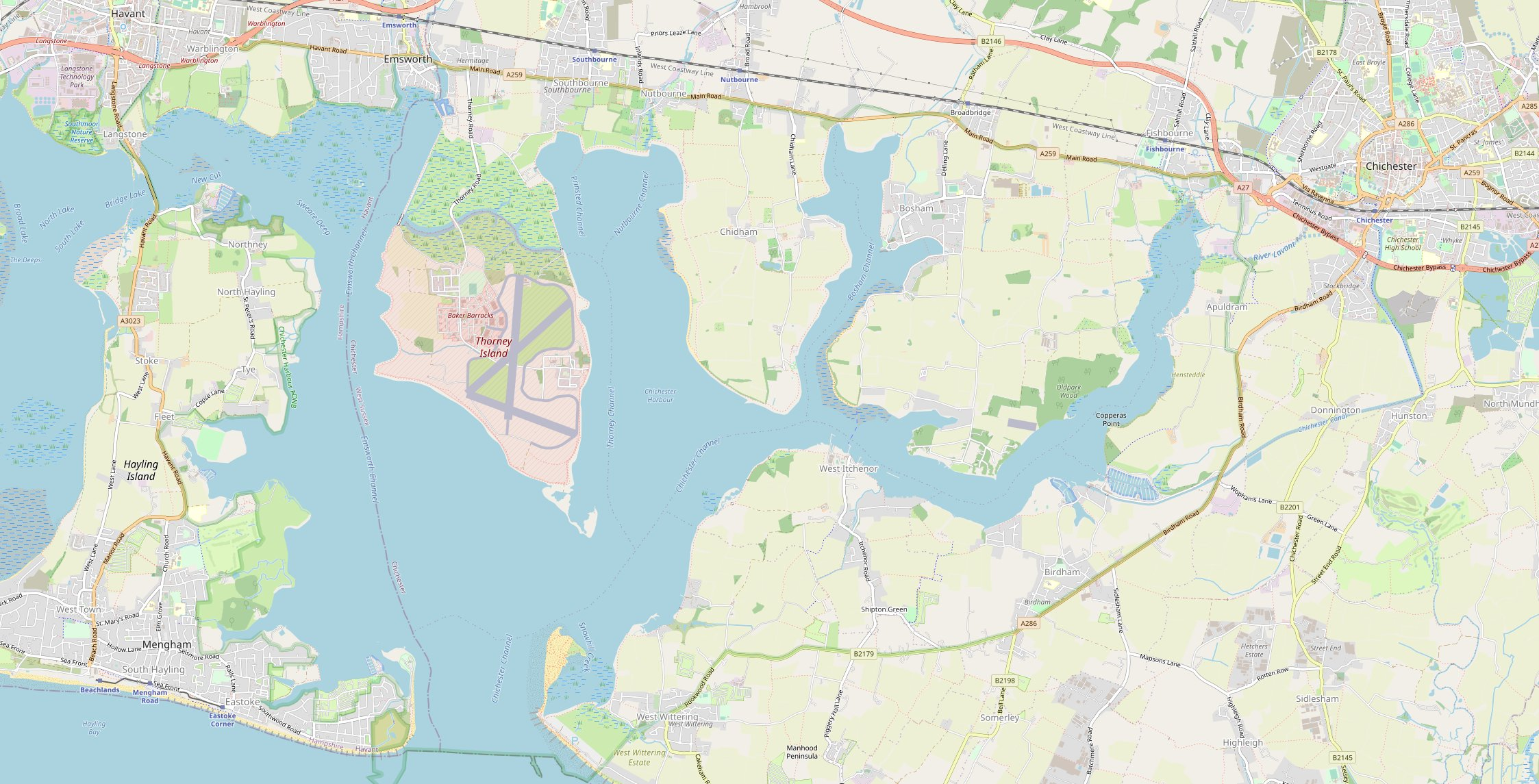
List of harbourside settlements

== Biology and geology ==
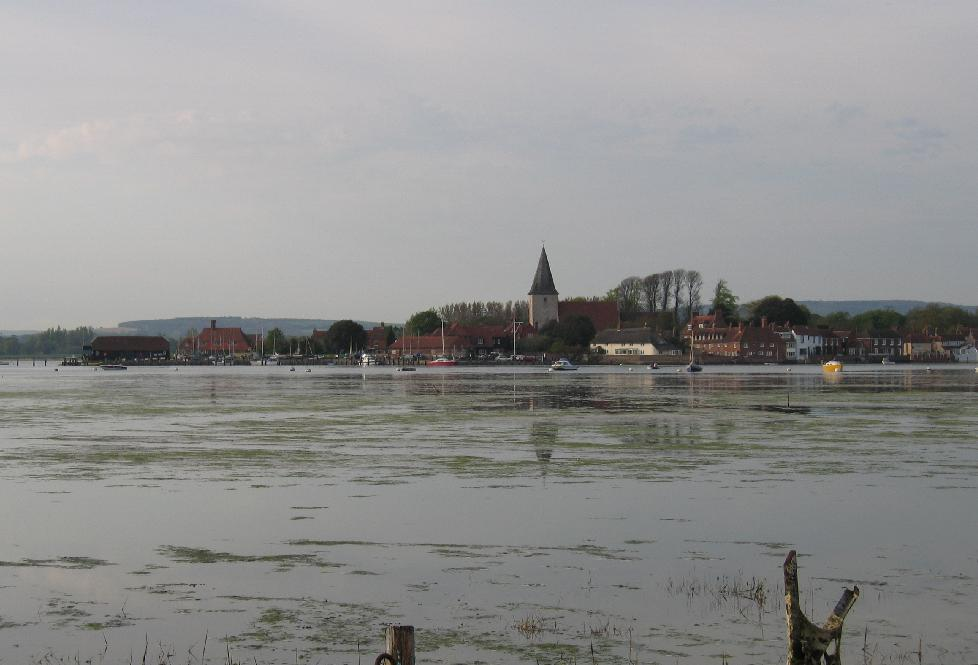
Bosham

The harbour has diverse habitats, including intertidal mudflats, shingle, saltmarsh, sand dunes, marshes and woodland. The mudflats provide feeding grounds for internationally important numbers of ringed plovers, grey plovers, redshanks, black-tailed godwits, dunlins, sanderlings, curlews and greenshanks. There are geologically important sand dunes and shingles at East Head and east of Langstone.

=== Water quality ===
The quality of water in the harbour was called into question when samples taken in 2022 were found to contain traces of numerous chemical compounds including prescribed medicines. The harbour has outflow from a water treatment plant.

== Designation ==
Year	Classification	Legislation
1964	Chichester Harbour Area of Outstanding Natural Beauty	National Parks and Access to the Countryside Act 1949
1970	Chichester Harbour Site of Special Scientific Interest	Wildlife and Countryside Act 1981
1987	Chichester and Langstone Harbours Ramsar site	Council Directive 2009/147/EC
1987	Chichester and Langstone Harbours Special Protection Area	Conservation of Habitats and Species Regulations 2017
1992	Solent Maritime Special Area of Conservation	Conservation of Habitats and Species Regulations 2010

== Recreation ==
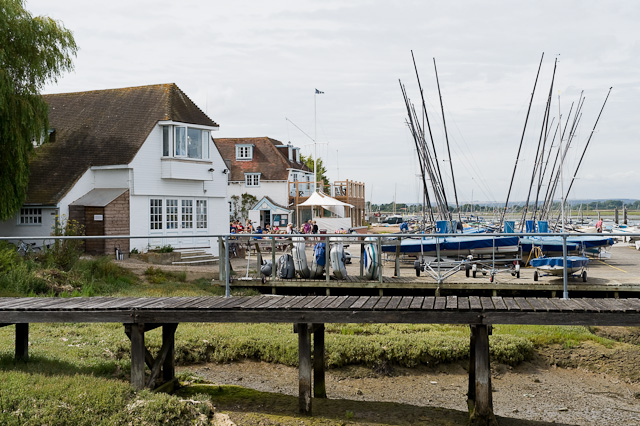
Itchenor Sailing Club

Chichester Harbour is used for a wide variety of sailing, including dinghy racing; it is the venue for the 'Itchenor Gallon' race for the International 14. There are several yacht marinas. It is also used for fishing.

Harbour tours depart year round from Itchenor in either a traditional boat or in Solar Heritage, a solar powered boat. During the summer regular trips depart from Emsworth on Solar Heritage and on the Victorian oyster boat Terror.

There is a small dory that operates as a ferry service between Itchenor and Bosham.

The harbour is a very popular area for birdwatching; guided bird walks and boat trips are offered during the winter months by Chichester Harbour Conservancy.

There is a network of footpaths for walkers and a cycle route from Chichester to West Wittering which passes through harbour countryside.

West Wittering Beach and East Head is the only sandy beach on the West Sussex coast and is a popular family and tourist destination on warm weekends.

== See also ==
- Hayling Island Lifeboat Station
