= Nutbourne railway station =

Railway station in West Sussex, England

Coordinates: 50.846°N 0.883°W

Nutbourne
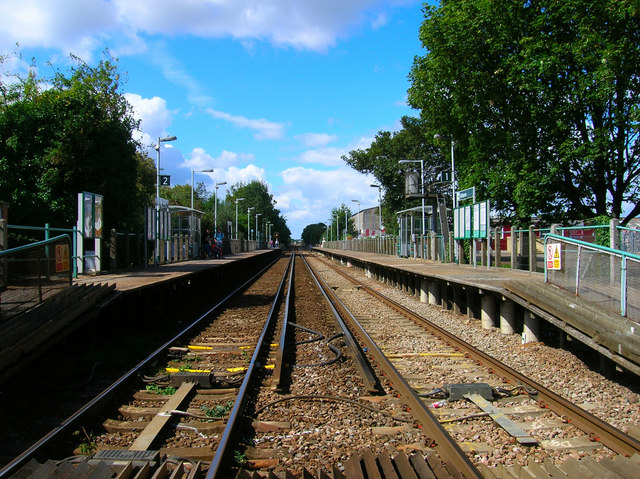

General information
- Location: Nutbourne, Chichester; England
- Grid reference: SU787057
- Managed by: Southern
- Platforms: 2

Other information
- Station code: NUT
- Classification: DfT category F2

History
- Opened: 1 April 1906

Passengers
- 2020/21: ▼36,120
- 2021/22: ▲64,556
- 2022/23: ▼63,552
- 2023/24: ▲63,732
- 2024/25: ▲66,914
Location
Notes
- Passenger statistics from the Office of Rail and Road

Nutbourne railway station serves the village of Nutbourne, near Chichester in West Sussex, England.

It is located on the West Coastway Line that runs between Brighton and Southampton, 33 miles 14 chains (33.17 miles, 53.39 km) from Brighton.

== Services ==
All services at Nutbourne are operated by Southern using Class 377 EMUs.

The typical off-peak service in trains per hour is:

- 1 tph to London Victoria via Horsham
- 1 tph to Portsmouth Harbour

Additional services, including trains to and from Brighton via Worthing call at the station during the peak hours.

On Sundays, eastbound services run to and from Brighton instead of London Victoria.

| Preceding station | National Rail | Following station |
|---|---|---|
| Bosham | Southern West Coastway Line | Southbourne |

== Gallery ==
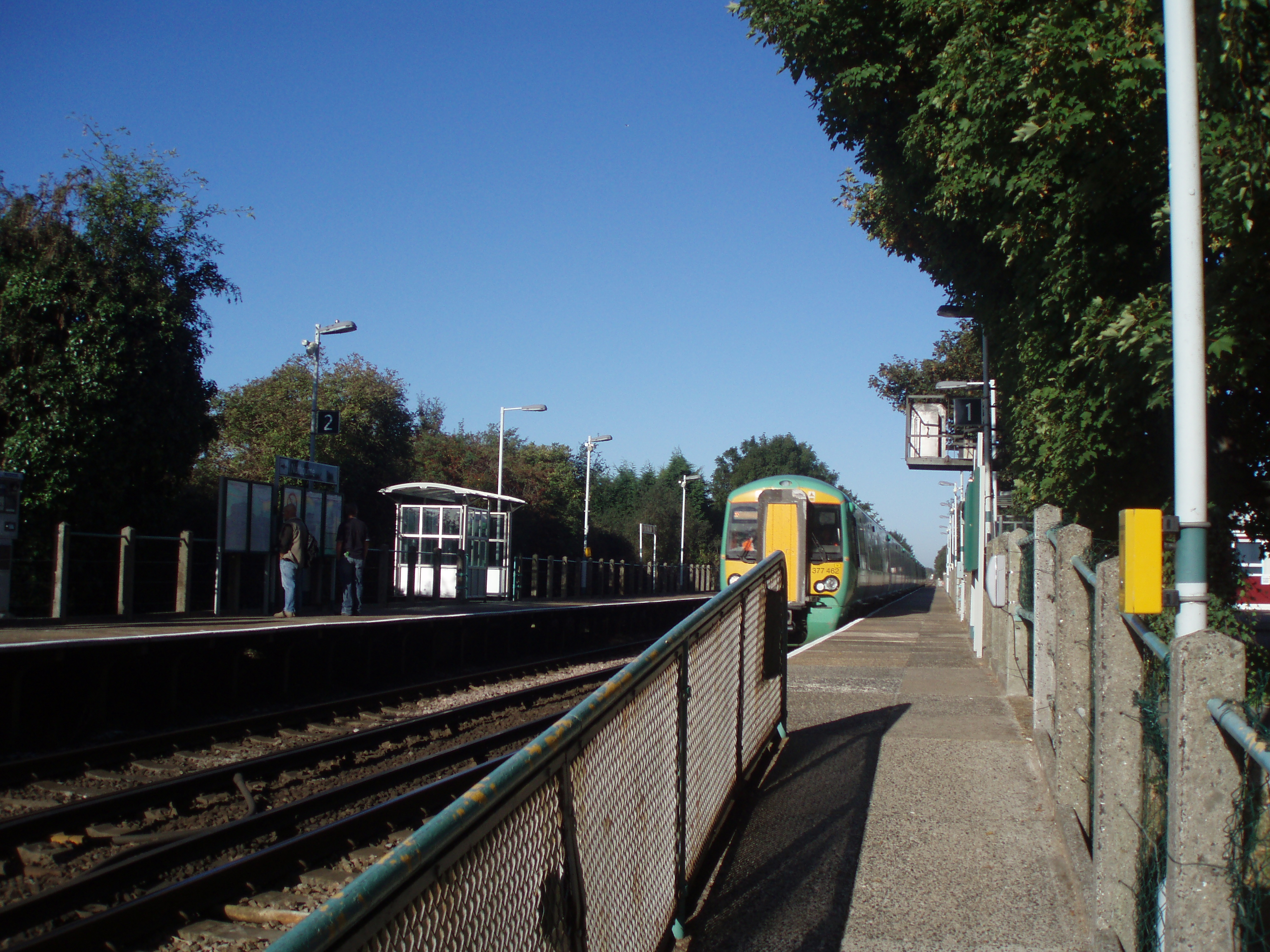
Entrance to Up platform

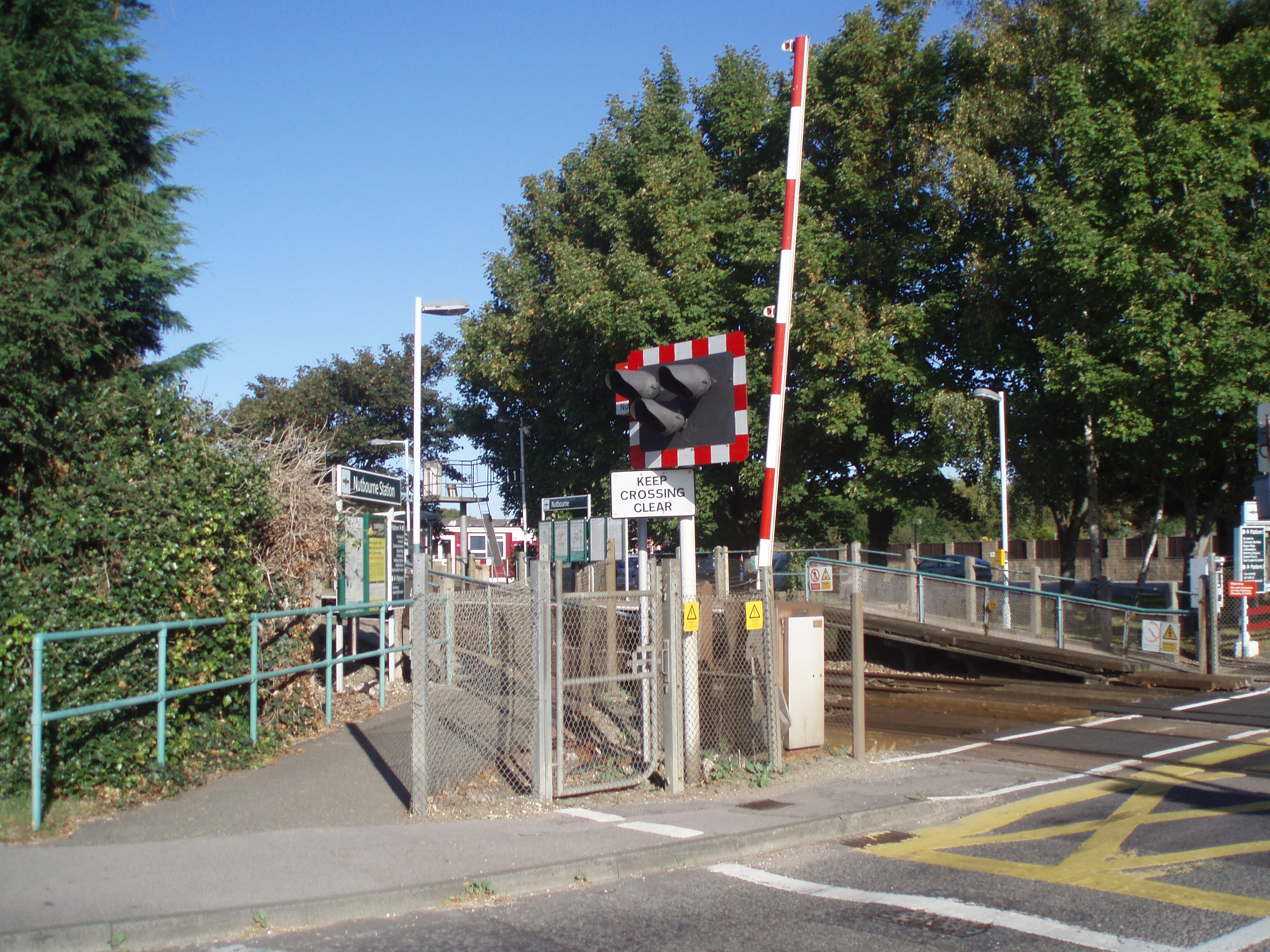
Entrance to Down platform

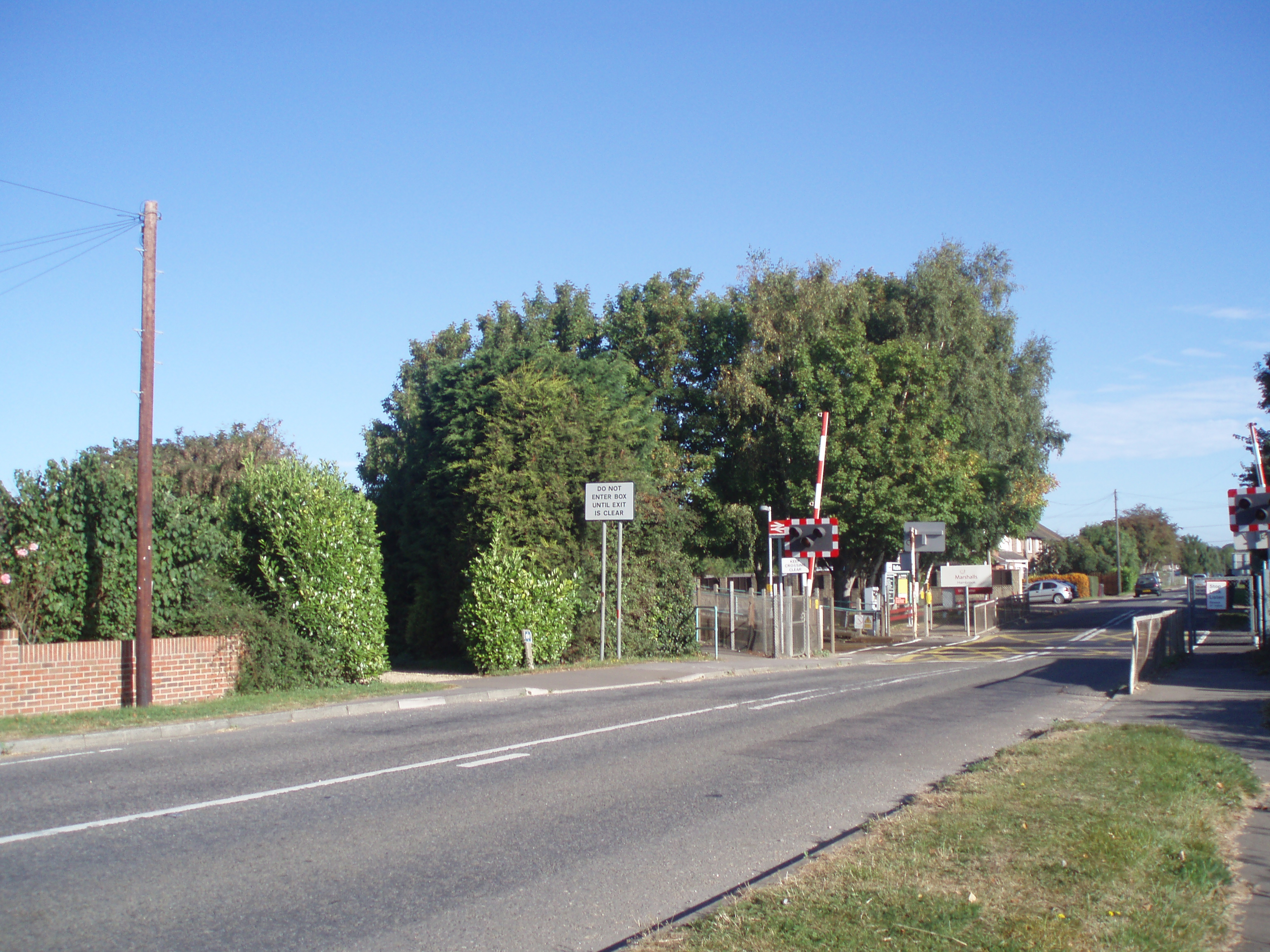
Approaching from junction with A259

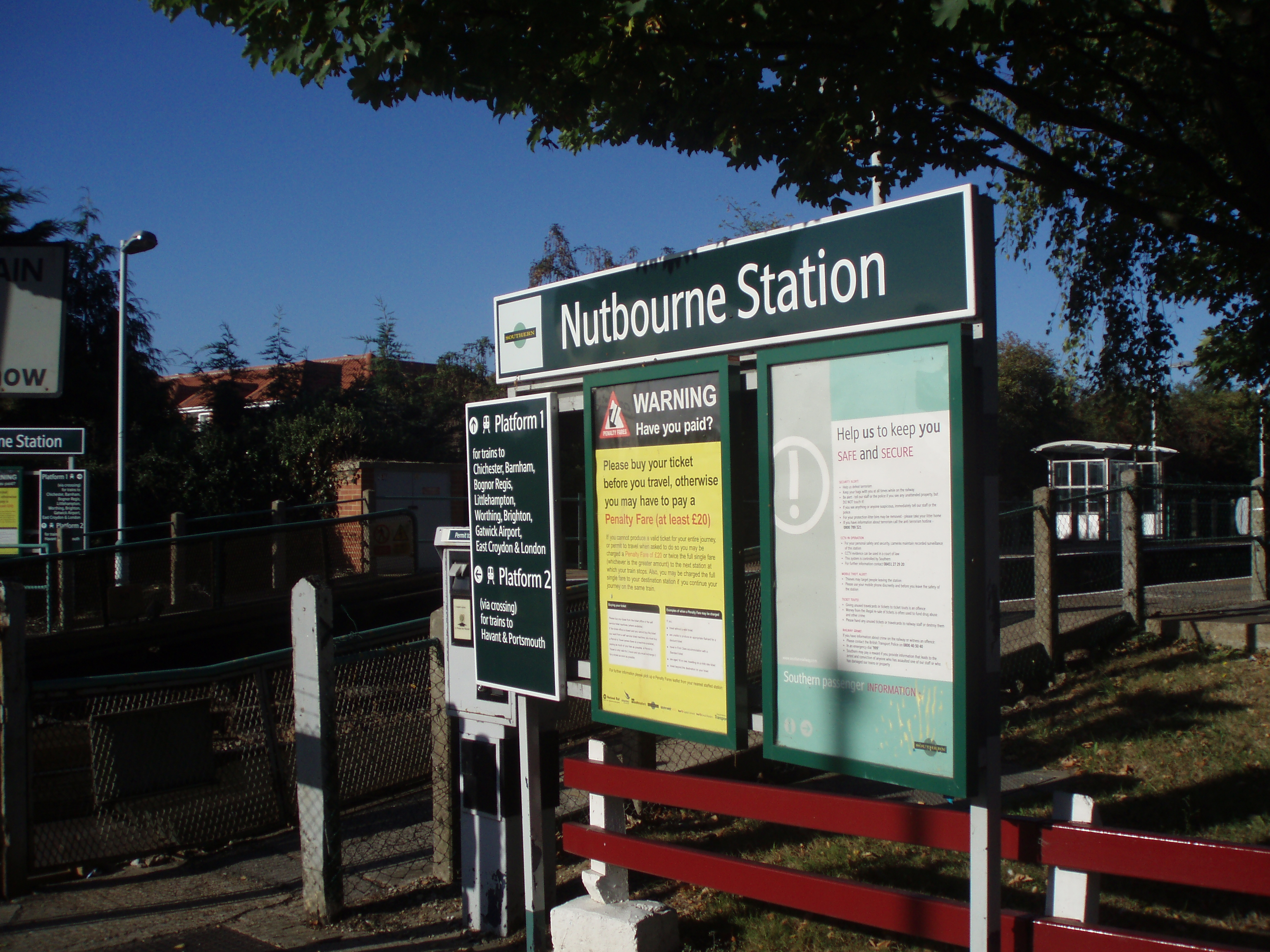
Station sign

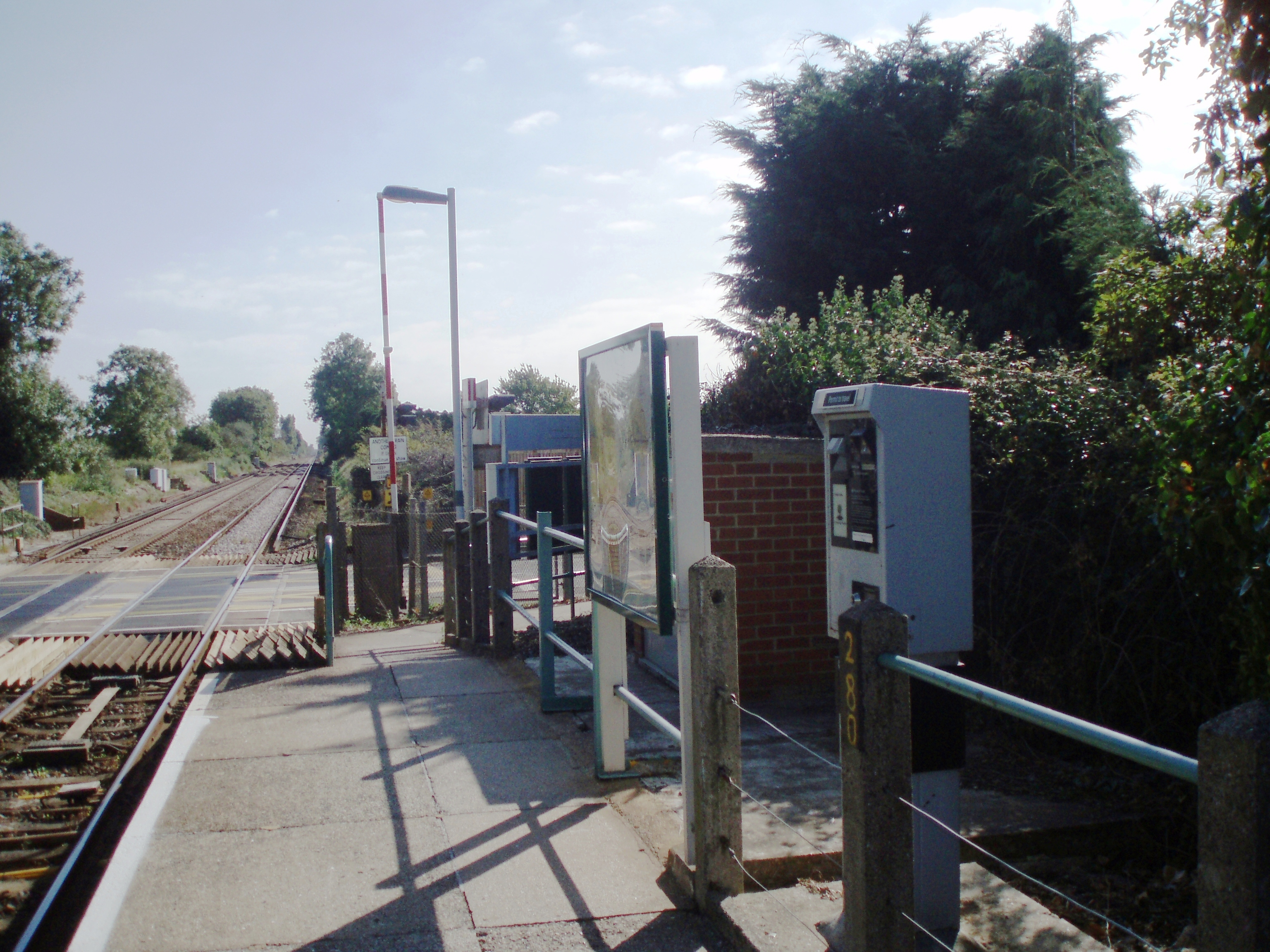
An unstaffed halt

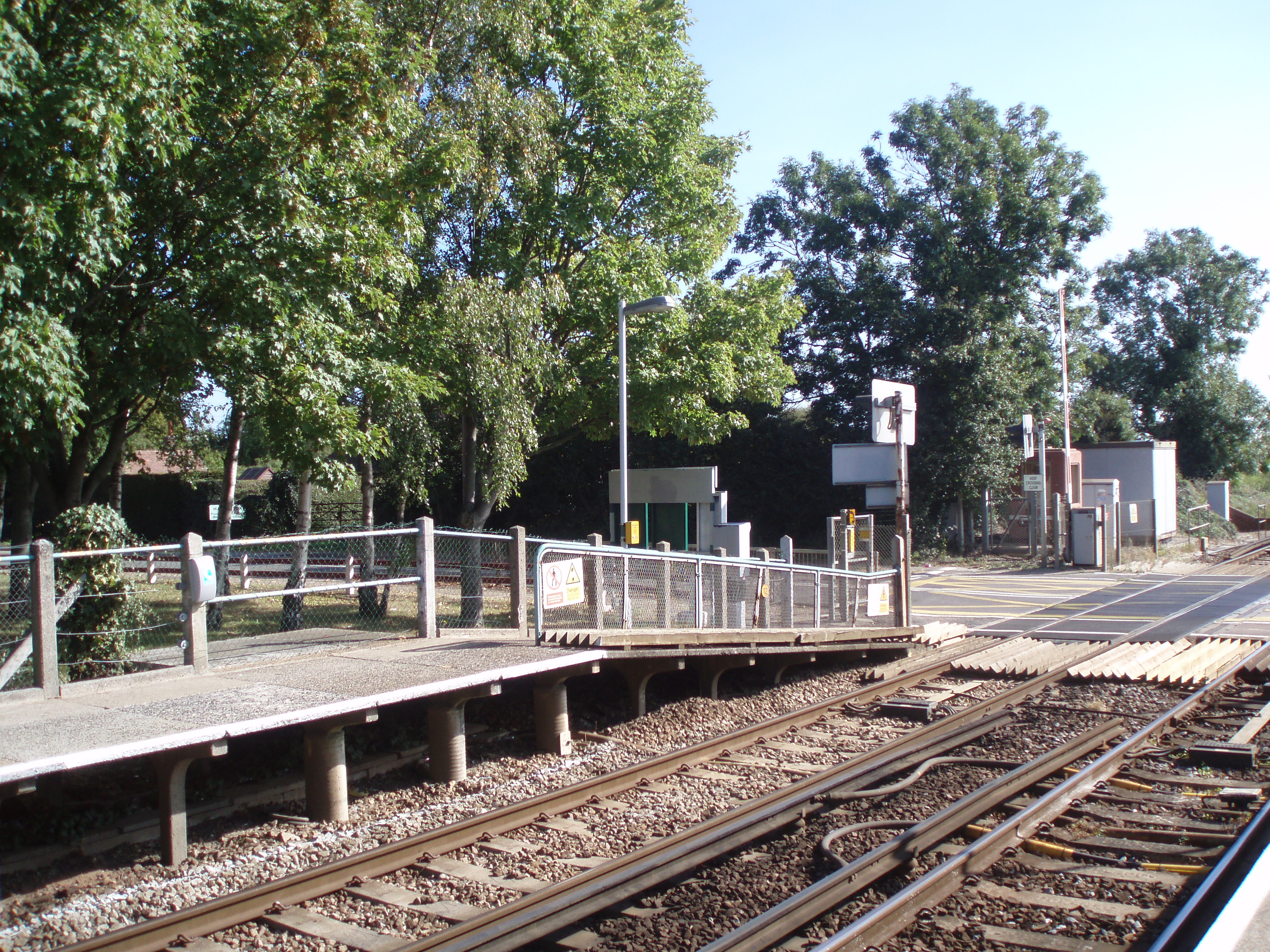
Looking towards Hambrook
