= Chichester railway station =

Railway station in West Sussex, England

Coordinates: 50°49′55″N 0°46′56″W

Chichester
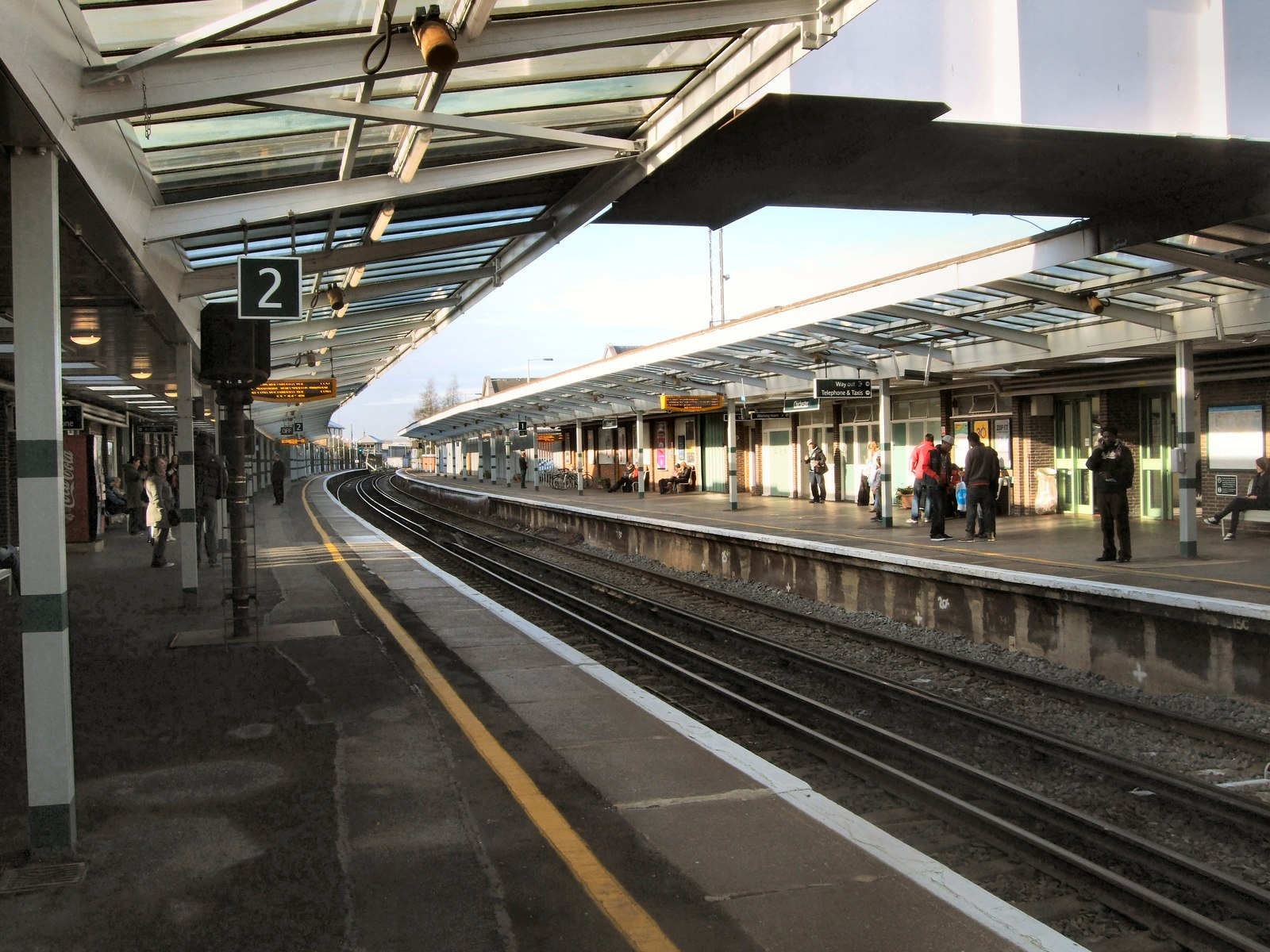

General information
- Location: Chichester; England
- Grid reference: SU858043
- Managed by: Southern
- Platforms: 2

Other information
- Station code: CCH
- Classification: DfT category C2

History
- Opened: 8 June 1846

Key dates
- 1957-1958: Extensively rebuilt

Passengers
- 2020/21: ▼0.914 million
- Interchange: ▼6,055
- 2021/22: ▲2.172 million
- Interchange: ▲19,347
- 2022/23: ▲2.435 million
- Interchange: ▲40,719
- 2023/24: ▲2.446 million
- Interchange: ▲44,044
- 2024/25: ▲2.687 million
- Interchange: ▲49,322
Location
Notes
- Passenger statistics from the Office of Rail and Road

Chichester railway station serves the city of Chichester, in West Sussex, England. It is 28 miles 51 chains (28.64 miles, 46.09 km) from Brighton.

The station is located on the Brighton to Portsmouth line of the LBSCR. Passenger services are operated under the brand name West Coastway Line, which runs between Brighton and Southampton Central. The station and all passenger services are operated by Southern.

== History ==
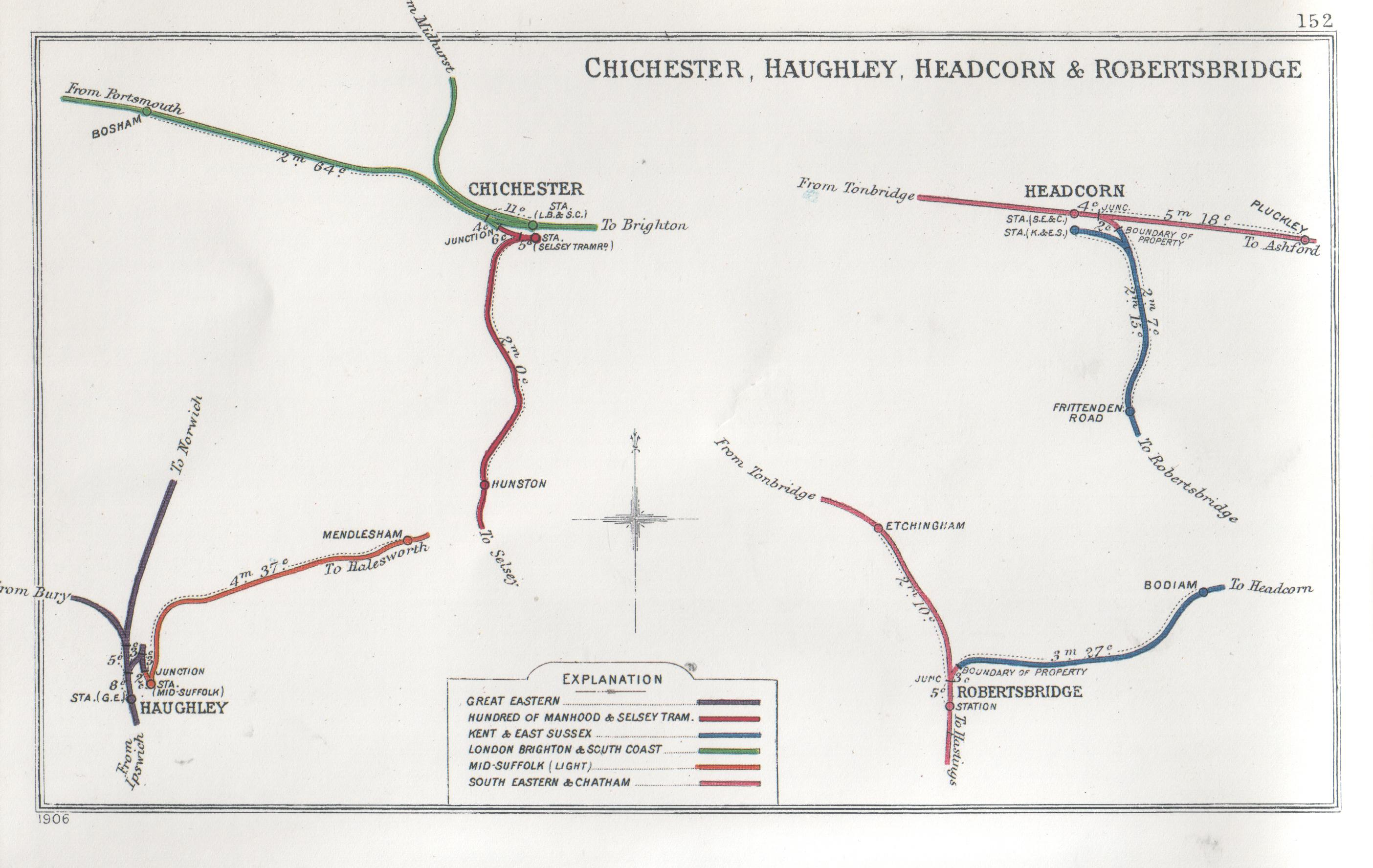
A 1906 Railway Clearing House junction diagram showing railways in the vicinity of Chichester (upper left)

The station opened in 1846 and, by the 1920s, it was listed in the top ten most prestigious Southern Railway stations due to royal use for Goodwood Racecourse race days. By the 1950s, the station had become dilapidated and was demolished and replaced with the modern station, which re-opened in 1961.

There used to be a branch line north to Midhurst and an additional two platforms which were up and down bay platforms at the west end of the station on the north side. An additional bay platform on the south side remains in situ but is disused.

== Services ==
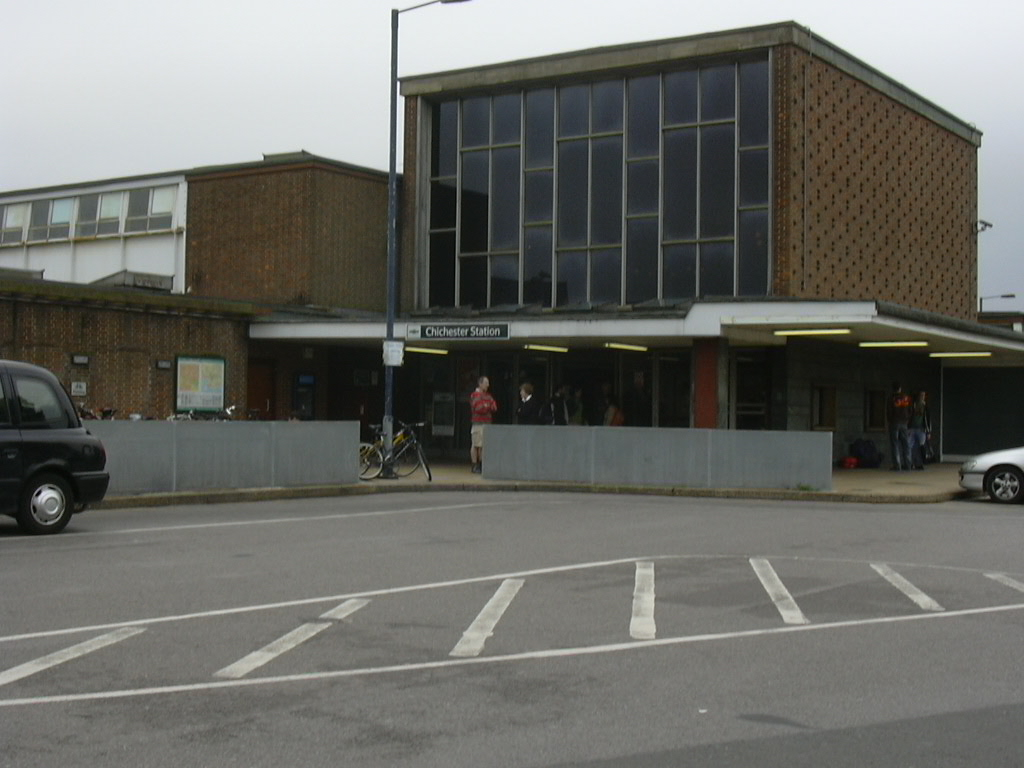
Station entrance

Services at Chichester are operated by Southern using Class 377 electric multiple units.

The typical off peak service in trains per hour is:

- 2 tph to London Victoria via Horsham
- 4 tph to Brighton, of which 1 runs via Littlehampton
- 2 tph to Southampton Central
- 3 tph to Portsmouth & Southsea, of which 2 continue to Portsmouth Harbour

On Sunday, the services to London Victoria and Southampton Central each reduce to 1 tph, the service to Portsmouth & Southsea reduces to 2 tph (although both continue to Portsmouth Harbour) and the service to Brighton reduces to 2 tph, with none of these trains running via Littlehampton.

Until May 2022, Great Western Railway operated limited services between Brighton, Portsmouth Harbour and Bristol Temple Meads that called at Chichester.

Preceding station	National Rail	Following station
Barnham	Southern West Coastway Line	Fishbourne or Southbourne or Havant
	Disused railways	
Lavant	Midhurst Railways	Terminus
Terminus	West Sussex Railway	Selsey
