= Chidham and Hambrook =

Parish in West Sussex, England

Coordinates: 50.82914°N 0.88307°W

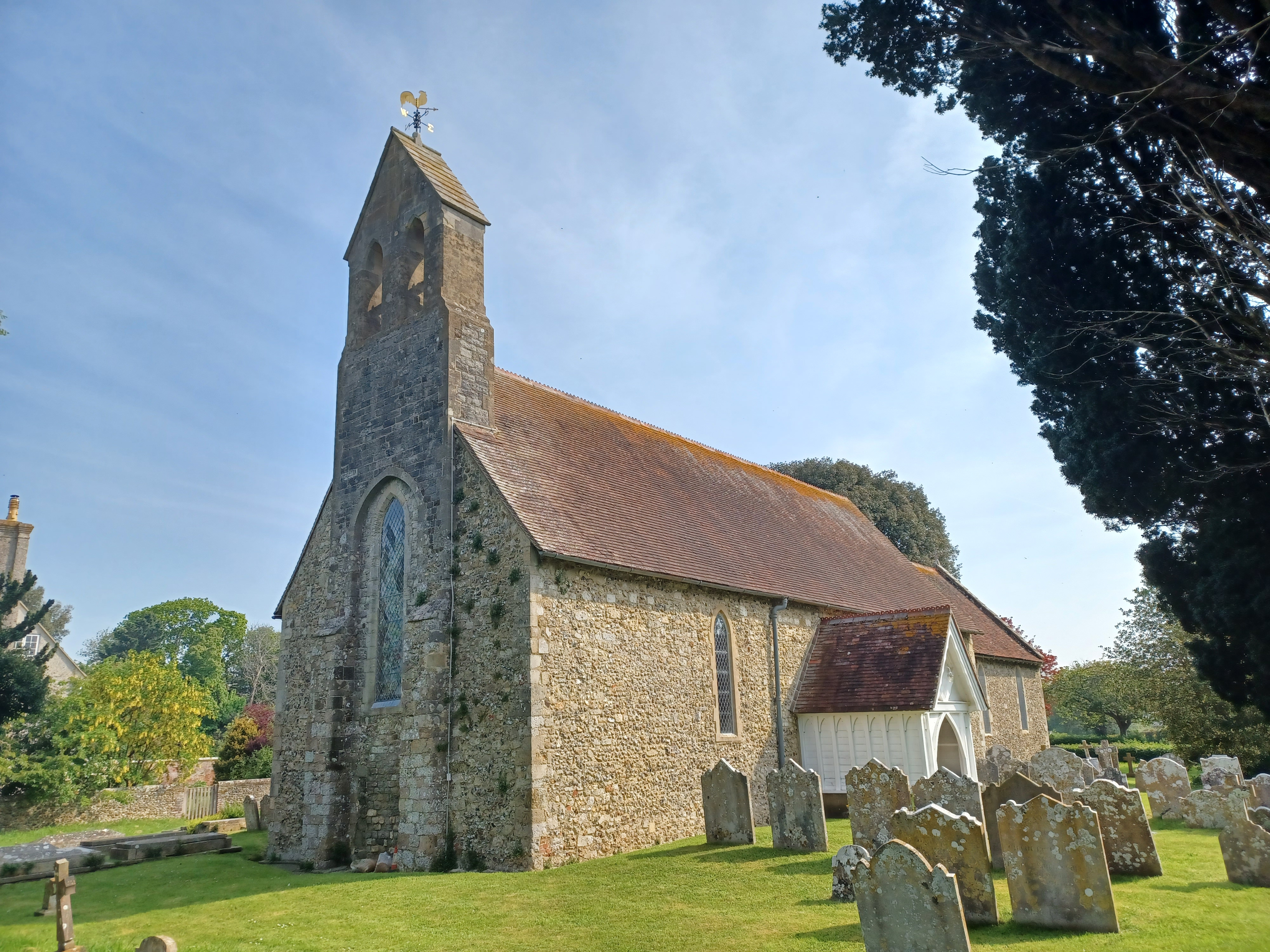
- Chidham church

- Location within West Sussex
- Area: 10.72 km^{2} (4.14 sq mi)
- Population: 1,356 2011 Census
  - Density: 117/km^{2} (300/sq mi)
- OS grid reference: SU788038
  - London: 57 miles (92 km) NE
- Civil parish: Chidham and Hambrook
- District: Chichester
- Shire county: West Sussex
- Region: South East
- Country: England
- Sovereign state: United Kingdom
- Post town: CHICHESTER
- Postcode district: PO18
- Dialling code: 01243
- Police: Sussex
- Fire: West Sussex
- Ambulance: South East Coast
- UK Parliament: Chichester
- Website: http://www.chidhamandhambrook.info/

Chidham and Hambrook is a civil parish in the Chichester district in West Sussex, England located approximately five miles (8 km) west of Chichester, south of the A27 road, near Bosham. In 2011 the parish had a population of 1356. Chidham is the ecclesiastical parish, with a slightly different boundary from that of the civil parish.

== History ==
=== Prehistory ===
A recent excavation has shown that man made use of Chidham more than 4,000 years ago. The flint scrapers discovered on the site on the western shore of the peninsula, seem to suggest that spear shafts or kiddles (fish traps) and primitive salterns were being made here.

=== Saxon, Norman and medieval ===
The village's name, first recorded as Chedeham in 1193, is derived from the Old English words cēod(e), meaning "bay", and hām, "homestead", or hamm, "peninsula". The present flint and rubble church, St. Mary's, dates from the 13th century, and may have had a wooden predecessor. The peninsula is not mentioned in the Domesday Book because it was part of the Manor or Chapelry of Bosham, rich in farming land and then belonging to the Bishop of Exeter.

=== 17th century ===
Close to the church of St. Mary is the manor house, a large late 17th-century building, now Grade II listed. The manor house has had recent work done with permission from the council.

=== 19th century ===
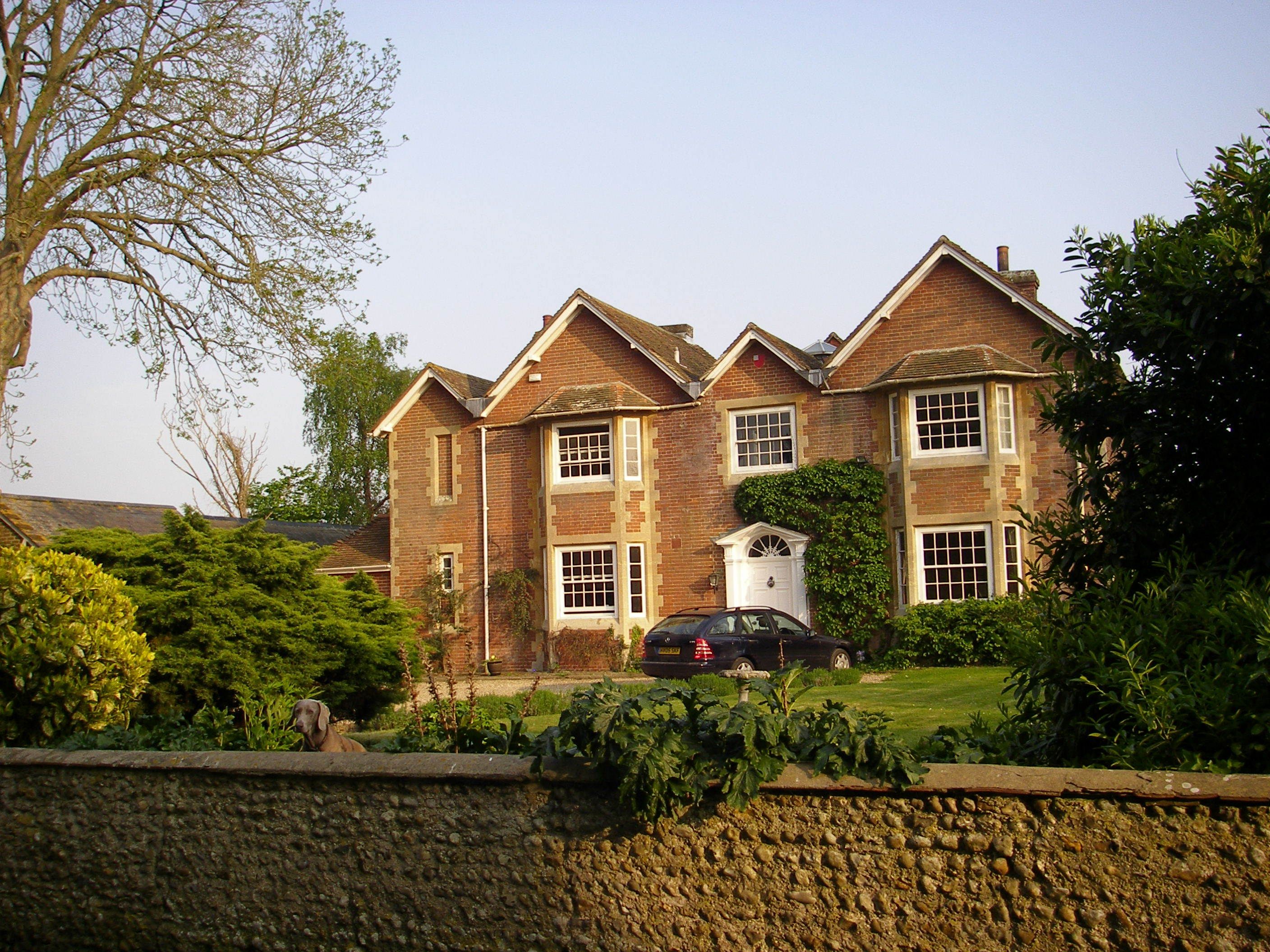
The Old Rectory, Chidham

Facing the church, on its south side, is a large early 19th-century vicarage known as the 'Old Rectory', now a private house.

The men of Chidham seem to have been farmers rather than fishermen or sailors, probably due to the good quality of the soil.

In 1812 an embankment wall was built from Chidham to Bosham, where use was made of an old quay. Writing of Bosham in the 1860s Charles Longcroft described how the newly enclosed land was ploughed and planted with corn. 'But one November, there came a raging tide and a gale wind, from the southwest and away went the embankment..'. In 1825 the sea returned, covering the farmland and inundating new buildings. One of these is said to have been a mansion, standing at Cutmill whose stone was afterwards used to build Cutmill Cottage. Chidham parish in the 1860s extended to 2,185 acres (884 ha) and had a population of 310.

=== 20th century ===
During the Second World War bombs were recorded as having fallen within the parish of Chidham. On the night of 8 October 1940 the vicarage, now the Old Rectory, was damaged by an incendiary and a torpedo bomber, carrying a crew of four, crashed close to the church. While the fire in the vicarage was quickly extinguished by the local volunteer fire service, the aeroplane proved a much greater hazard.

On the night of 25–26 April 1941, when there was a raid on Portsmouth, seven high explosive bombs fell near Manor Farm.

== Today ==
Chidham village lies on a loop-road, halfway down the peninsula. The only road leading out to Cobnor Point is a private road, so access to and from the harbour is limited. The local authority area called the 'Parish of Chidham' is a small rural parish situated five miles (8 km) west of Chichester and comprises two villages – Hambrook and Chidham. The residents of part of a third village, Nutbourne, are also part of the Chidham and Hambrook community, but because of the vagaries of local government, technically fall outside the parish.

There is a network of public footpaths for walkers, giving access to the shore and intertidal mudflats of Chichester harbour. The land is largely flat and agricultural, but with sufficient variety and cover for a variety of wildlife.

Parts of the Chidham peninsula are potentially at risk from tidal flooding. The west tide bank is in a poor state, but the Harbour Conservancy proposes to realign a section of the bank in autumn 2005; this will have the added benefit of creating 22 hectares (54 acres) of intertidal habitat. Elsewhere, the tide banks are in generally good condition.

The present flint and rubble church only dates from the 13th century – a wooden one may have stood here before. Close by is the manor house, a large late 17th-century building.

A significant proportion of residents are relatively new to their current home, with 36% having lived there for less than six years. On the other hand, 18% have occupied their home for more than twenty-five years. Most homes (83%) are owner-occupied and 99% of dwellings are the households' main residence. The people of the community are evenly divided between the sexes (48% male, 52% female) and the age distribution of people over 11 years old is more uniform than might be expected. 8% of residents are aged between 11 and 17 years and 9% are aged 75 years or more. Children under 11 years old constitute 14% of the population.

The parish is cut by two east–west lines of communication – the A259 and the Portsmouth to Brighton railway line. The Chidham peninsula extends southwards into Chichester Harbour and lies within an Area of Outstanding Beauty (AONB). The whole of the parish, with the exception of two Settlement Policy Areas (SPAs), lies within the Rural Area, as defined in the Chichester District Local Plan.

There are 705 households in the community, with a total population of about 1,800, including children. The population is concentrated in three areas. There is no single focal point in the community. Around 41% of the households lie to the north of the railway line and 49% to the south; the remainder are technically part of Nutbourne, also to the south of the railway line.

The parish is served by a railway halt and a half-hour bus service along the A259. There is a primary school, a church, a village hall and a church centre. Facilities include a post office/shop, three inns, two riding stables, three caravan sites and three residential nursing homes. The recently closed garage/shop site presently supports a car wash, a picture framer and a used car lot. Further employment is provided by arable farming, market gardening, nurseries and orchards and also a national concrete product manufacturer and several small rural businesses. The youth of West Sussex and elsewhere are catered for by two activity centres, each having a strong sailing bias, located adjacent to the Bosham Channel where there is also a dinghy park and slipway.

The civil Parish of Chidham was increased in area in April 2003, when the west side of Broad Road north of the railway line, Priors Leaze Lane, Hambrook Hill South and Shepherd's Meadow were included. This brought the whole of the Hambrook community into the parish. However, a similar proposal to bring part of Nutbourne into the parish was not implemented. Over the last 10 years from 1995 to date, there have been approximately 72 new houses built within the current parish of Chidham. Most of these are to the north of the railway line in Hambrook. In addition to these, several conversions of existing buildings into dwellings have also taken place and approximately 10 new houses have been built within the additional consultation area in Nutbourne. The Shepherd's Meadow development in 1999 is of note in that 36 houses were constructed on a single site, allocated in the Local Plan, between Hambrook Hill South and Broad Road.

Local organisations include the Parish Council which has nine elected members. The Hambrook and District Residents' Association (HDRA) currently represents 126 households. Chidham WI meets monthly in the village hall and draws members from both within and outside the parish. St Mary's Church has a thriving congregation and Chidham Parochial Primary School, with 91 pupils, has an active Parents, Teachers and Friends' Association. Clubs and societies meet in both the village hall and St Wilfrid's Church Centre.

== Landmarks ==
Chichester Harbour, a Site of Special Scientific Interest, is partly within the Chidham and Hambrook parish. This is a wetland of international importance, a Special Protection Area for wild birds and a Special Area of Conservation. The harbour is of particular importance for wintering wildfowl and waders of which five species reach numbers which are internationally important.

== Freedom of the Parish ==
The following people and military units have received the Freedom of the Parish of Chidham and Hambrook.

=== Individuals ===
- Clifford "Cliff" Archer: 17 August 2022.
