= Fishbourne, West Sussex =

Village and parish in West Sussex, England

Coordinates: 50.8354°N 0.812°W

Fishbourne
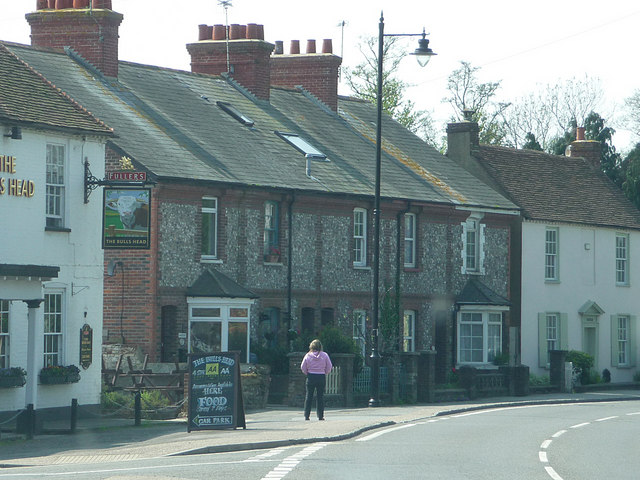
- Fishbourne village centre

- Location within West Sussex
- Area: 3.87 km^{2} (1.49 sq mi)
- Population: 2,325. 2011 Census
  - Density: 505/km^{2} (1,310/sq mi)
- OS grid reference: SU837046
  - London: 55 miles (89 km) NNE
- Civil parish: Fishbourne
- District: Chichester
- Shire county: West Sussex
- Region: South East
- Country: England
- Sovereign state: United Kingdom
- Post town: CHICHESTER
- Postcode district: PO18, PO19
- Dialling code: 01243
- Police: Sussex
- Fire: West Sussex
- Ambulance: South East Coast
- UK Parliament: Chichester

Fishbourne is a village and civil parish in the Chichester District of West Sussex, England and is situated two miles (3.2 km) west of Chichester.

The Anglican parish of Fishbourne, formerly New Fishbourne, is in the Diocese of Chichester. The population in 1861 was 347. The parish church is dedicated to St Peter and St Mary.

The civil parish has a land area of 387 hectares (956 acres). In the 2001 census 1,953 people lived in 840 households, of whom 910 were economically active. There are two public houses and a railway station.

== History ==
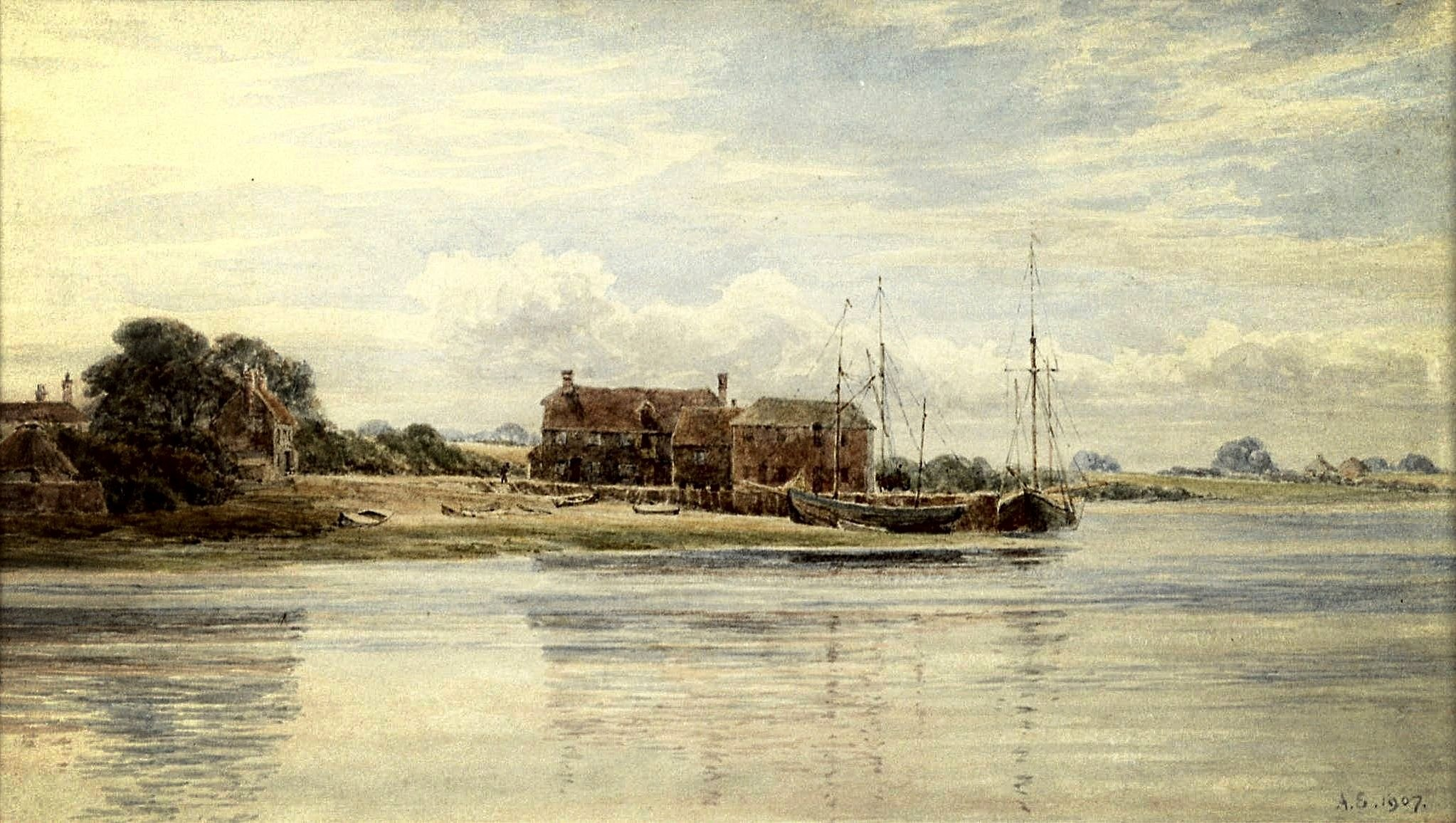
Dell Quay near Fishbourne. Watercolour by Arthur Evershed, 1907

=== Toponymy ===
The name Fishbourne derives from the Old English words fisc (fish) and burna (stream), and means the stream where fish are caught. The name of the settlement was recorded in the Domesday Book in 1086 as Fiseborne.

=== Domesday Book ===
Fishbourne is listed the Domesday Book of 1086 in the Hundred of Stockbridge as having 18 households, two mills, meadows and plough lands, with an annual value of 7 pounds.

== Governance ==
Fishbourne civil parish was created in 1987 from parts of Appledram, Bosham, Chichester and Funtington parishes. The parish falls under the Chichester District Council ward of Harbour Villages, the West Sussex County Council division of Chichester West, and the UK Parliament constituency of Chichester, whose MP since 2024 is Jess Brown-Fuller, a Liberal Democrat.

== Roman Palace ==
Fishbourne is the location of Fishbourne Roman Palace, a major archaeological site, believed to be one of the most important sites of Roman Britain. The palace contains several mosaics, including the famous Cupid on a Dolphin Mosaic.

The Palace is believed to have been owned by Tiberius Claudius Cogidubnus, a leader of the local Regni tribe, who had their capital at nearby Noviomagus Reginorum. There is evidence of occupation on the site even before the Roman Invasion. A "Proto Palace", constructed out of timber frame, is believed to have been constructed around 50 AD. Subsequently, the wooden buildings were replaced by a stone palace, one of the finest in the Roman world, with construction beginning around 75 AD. The palace was damaged by fire, possibly in a raid by Saxon pirates, at the end of the third century AD and was never rebuilt.

== Fishbourne Manor ==
Located at the North end of Appledram Lane South, between the parishes of Appledram and Fishbourne, origins of The Manor can be dated back to the reign of Henry VIII.

Fishbourne was annexed to the honor of Petworth in April 1540 and for the first time referred to as a Manor. It is said to have been held of the Crown in chief by 'Sir Thomas White and others' in 1558, but in 1560 the Manor of New Fishbourne was granted to John Fenner, who died on Christmas Day 1566. From 1570, The Manor was owned by Francis Bowyer, alderman of London, and his wife Elizabeth. Their son Sir William Bowyer settled the manor on himself and his wife Mary in 1605, and four years later passed it on his son Henry on his marriage with Anne, daughter of Nicholas Salter. In 1633, The Manor was sold to William Cawley. During The Restoration, Cawley's estates were forfeited and Fishbourne was among the manors given to James, Duke of York. Other recorded owners of The Manor House included Sir John Biggs, Sir Thomas Miller, Dame Susannah Miller, The Rev. Sir Thomas Combe Miller, 6th bart., Edward Stanford and Major-General Byron.

The Manor House is dated 1687 on a North wing added to the building by Sir Thomas Miller.

== Notable people ==
British writer, Kate Mosse, grew up in Fishbourne.
