= Pilsey Island =

Nature reserve in West Sussex, England

Coordinates: 50.801°N 0.909°W

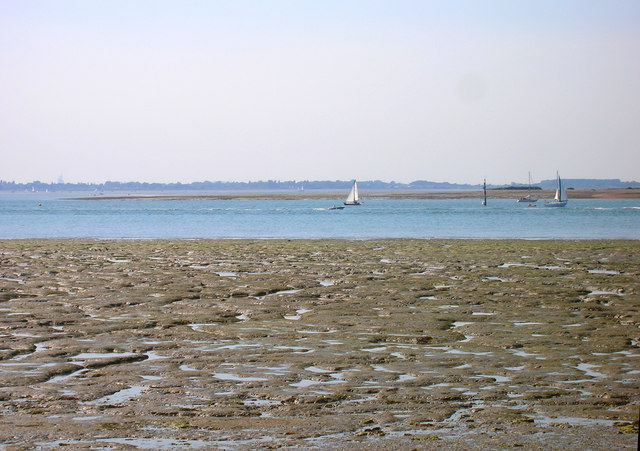
- Interactive map of Pilsey Island
- Type: Local Nature Reserve
- Location: Chichester Harbour, West Sussex
- OS grid: SU 770 007
- Area: 17.8 hectares (44 acres)
- Manager: Royal Society for the Protection of Birds

Pilsey Island is a 17.8-hectare (44-acre) Local Nature Reserve in Chichester Harbour in West Sussex. It is owned by the Ministry of Defence and managed by the Royal Society for the Protection of Birds. It is part of the Chichester Harbour Site of Special Scientific Interest and Nature Conservation Review site, Grade I*, the Chichester and Langstone Harbours Ramsar site and Special Protection Area, and the Solent Maritime Special Area of Conservation.

The island has sand dunes, mudflats, salt marsh and bare and vegetated shingle. There are many plants, spiders and insects.

There is no public access to the site.
