= Emsworth Town Hall =

Municipal building in Emsworth, Hampshire, England

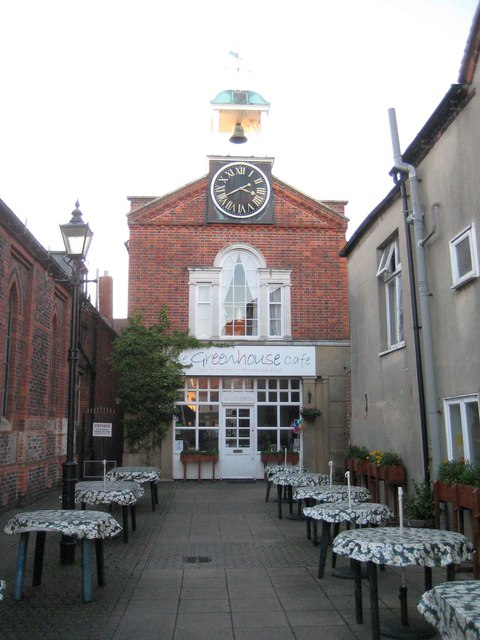
- The building in 2013

- Shown in Hampshire
- 50.8464°N 0.9370°W
- Location: St Peter's Square, Emsworth

History
- Built: 1790

Site notes
- Architect(s): John Painter and John Sueter
- Architectural style: Italianate style

Emsworth Town Hall is a former chapel which later served as an events venue in St Peter's Square in Emsworth, a town in Hampshire, in England. It currently serves as a café.

== History ==
The building was commissioned as St Peter's Chapel, a chapel of ease to St Thomas a Becket's Church, Warblington. It was designed by John Painter and John Sueter in the Italianate style, built in red brick with stone dressings at a cost of £1,400, and was completed in 1790. The original design involved a symmetrical main frontage of three bays, with a gable above, facing towards St Peter's Square. The central bay featured a three-stage tower with a Venetian window at the top of the first stage, a blind second stage, and a clock face in the third stage. The outer bays were fenestrated by tall round headed windows on the ground floor with oval-shaped windows above. At roof level, there was a small bell tower with an ogee-shaped roof and a weather vane.

In 1845, St James' Church was erected in North Street, and the chapel closed in 1852. It then fell vacant and, after two decades, became quite derelict. In 1876, it was bought by the Emsworth Proprietary Hall Company, for use as an events venue. The directors of the company initiated an extensive refurbishment project, which involved the removal of the original three stage clock tower. In 1881 the building was renamed Emsworth Town Hall. Although it was never used for municipal purposes, it was a popular venue for lectures, theatrical performances and concerts.

In 1912, the building was converted for cinema use. As part of the conversion works the main frontage was remodelled. The ground floor was clad in rusticated stone and a wide opening was installed, flanked by pairs of Doric order pilasters. The new frontage recaptured many of the features of the original design including the Venetian window on the first floor, the pediment, the clock face and the bell tower. It operated as the Town Hall Cinema and started showing silent films.

The building was rebranded as the Pavilion Cinema in 1930. It continued in that use for another two decades until 1953, when the cinema closed, and the building became a builders' merchant, trading as Reeves Limited. However, there was a serious fire, causing considerable damage to the business, in July 1994.

The former chapel was then converted into a café and re-opened as such in 1998. It began trading as the Greenhouse Café in 2002, and was briefly renamed the Redhouse Café in April 2015, as part of a promotion led by the comedian, Hugh Dennis, to raise money for Comic Relief. After it was acquired by Steve and Gemma Cross, it was renamed the Cross Kitchen in October 2021. The business was awarded the title of "Best Cafe" in the "Muddy Stilettos Awards", which recognise small independent lifestyle businesses, in 2023.
