= George Wilder (cricketer) =

English cricketer

Personal information
- Born: 9 June 1876; Stansted Park, Sussex, England
- Died: 10 June 1948 (aged 72); Las Vegas, Nevada, United States
- Bowling: Fast

Domestic team information
- Years: Team
- 1905–1906: Sussex
- 1909: Hampshire

Career statistics
Competition	First-class
Matches	8
Runs scored	203
Batting average	13.53
100s/50s	0/0
Top score	43
Balls bowled	96
Wickets	4
Bowling average	12.75
5 wickets in innings	0
10 wickets in match	0
Best bowling	3/14
Catches/stumpings	2/–
- Source: Cricinfo, 13 December 2009

George Wilder (9 June 1876 – 10 June 1948) was an English first-class cricketer.

The son of George Wilder senior and Mary Laura Wilder, he was born at Stansted Park on the Sussex–Hampshire border in June 1876. He was educated at Eton College, before matriculating to St John's College, Oxford. Wilder began his connection with Sussex County Cricket Club in 1901, when he joined the club's committee, a position he would retain until 1905. Wilder played his club cricket for the cricket club on the Stansted estate grounds, and made his debut in first-class cricket for Sussex against the Marylebone Cricket Club at Lord's in 1905. He played first-class cricket for Sussex until 1906, making six appearances. For Sussex, he scored 147 runs at an average of 13.36, with a highest score of 26. He later played for an England XI against Hambledon in a commemorative first-class match in 1908 at Broadhalfpenny Down. Wilder followed this up with a single appearance for Hampshire against Derbyshire at Southampton in the 1909 County Championship; he took figures of 3 for 14 in Derbyshire's first innings. However, it was deemed by the cricketing authorities that he did not meet the qualification criteria to play for Hampshire and thus never featured for the county again.

Wilder inherited Stansted Park following the death of his father in 1896. It was during Wilder's ownership of the estate that the house was destroyed by fire on 27 July 1900, losing many valuables, including carvings by Grinling Gibbons. He had the house rebuilt on the same location in 1903, with this version of the house retained to this day. Wilder sold the Stansted estate to Major Cecil Whittaker in 1913. Prior to selling the estate, Wilder was active in civic life in nearby Emsworth, laying a commemorative stone to the then under-construction Post Office in 1906. In 1911, his wife, the actress Una Evelyn Mazie Wilder, whom he wanted to divorce for misconduct, fled to the United States. Wilder eventually traced her to New York City and began divorce proceedings. His wife was charged with threats to kill in March 1912, having wrote a letter which stated: "George Wilder, the day you get a divorce will be your last on Earth. You shall be shot through the heart. So take warning". Wilder died a day after his 72nd birthday, on 10 June 1948 at Las Vegas in the United States.
