= Warblington School =

School in Havant, Hampshire, England

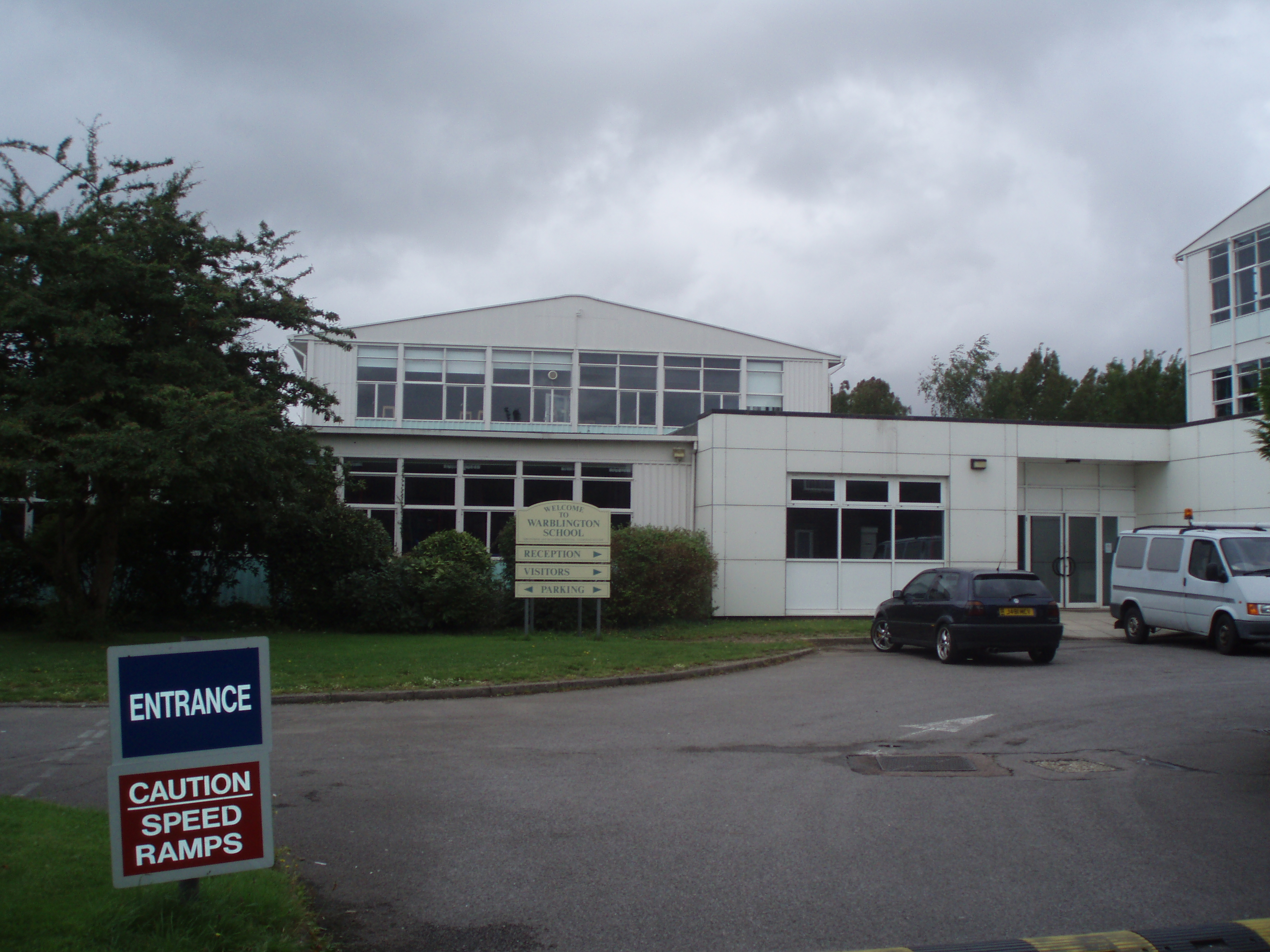

Location
- Southleigh Road; Warblington; Havant, Hampshire, PO9 2RR; England
- 50.8526°N 0.9690°W

Information
- Type: Community school
- Local authority: Hampshire
- Department for Education URN: 116475 Tables
- Ofsted: Reports
- Head: Michael Hartnell
- Gender: Coeducational
- Age: 11 to 16
- Houses: Paxton; Stowe; Mitchell; Norris
- Website: http://www.warblingtonschool.co.uk/

Warblington School is a coeducational community secondary school, located in the Warblington area of Havant in the English county of Hampshire.

The school is situated opposite Warblington railway station, toward the east of Havant on the Hampshire and West Sussex border serving the surrounding area. It is administered by Hampshire County Council which coordinates the schools admissions.

Warblington School offers GCSEs as programmes of study for pupils. It is the only school located in Warblington, as the area does not have any primary schools.

The property was Grade II listed in June 2019 by Historic England because of architectural and historic interest.

The school came under criticism in 2019 after a PE teacher, Sean Aldridge, was sentenced to 12 years in prison for having sexual relations with 4 girls attending the school from the ages of 13 to 16 between 2007 and 2012.

== Notable former pupils ==
- Julia Chambers, actress
- Bobby Tambling, Chelsea and England footballer.
- Nicholas Lyndhurst, actor
