= Warblington railway station =

Railway station in Hampshire, England

Warblington
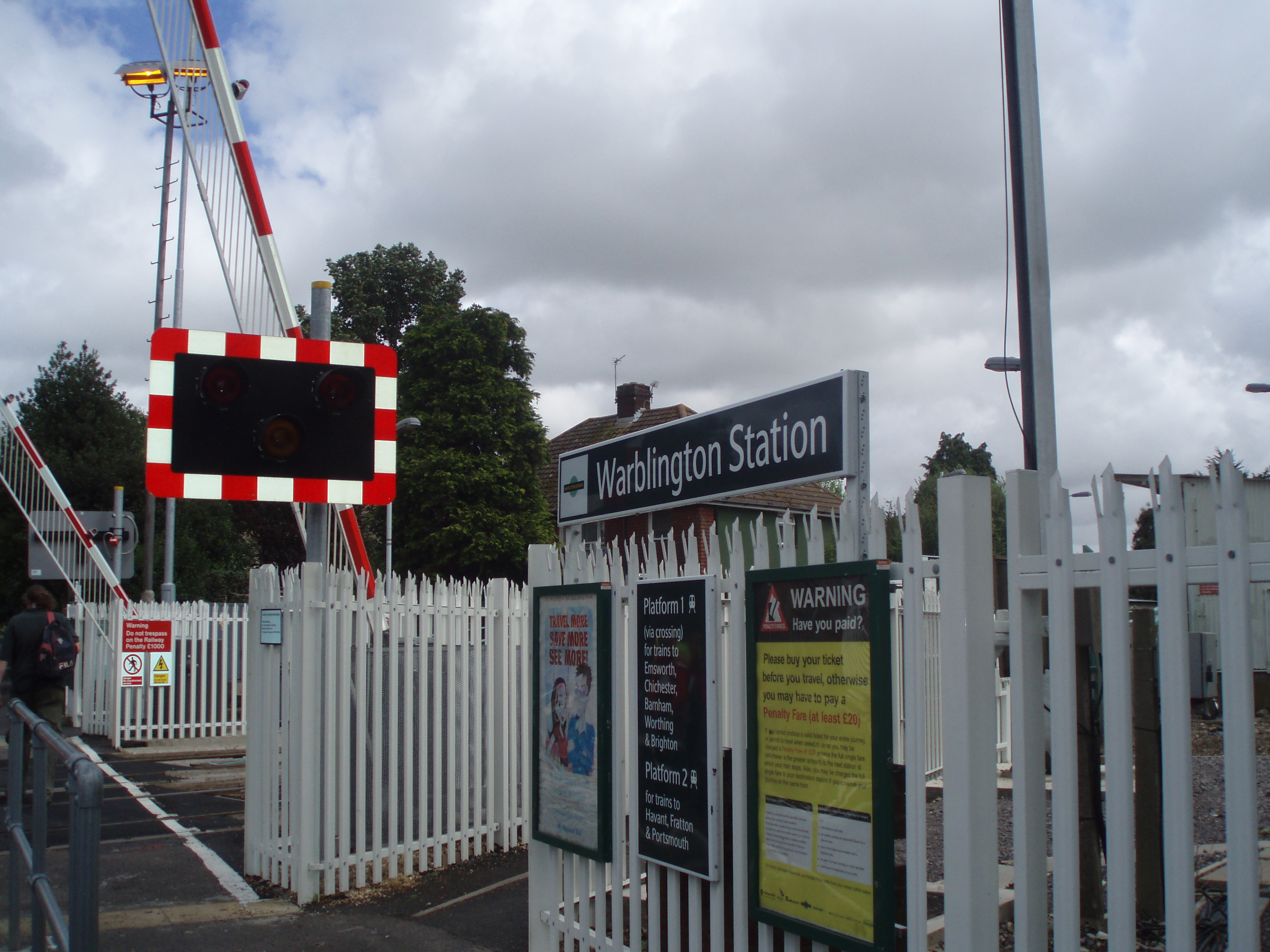

General information
- Location: Warblington, Havant; England
- Coordinates: 50°51′12″N 0°58′00″W
- Grid reference: SU727065
- Manager: Southern
- Platforms: 2

Other information
- Station code: WBL
- Classification: DfT category E

History
- Original company: London, Brighton and South Coast Railway
- Pre-grouping: London, Brighton and South Coast Railway
- Post-grouping: Southern Railway

Key dates
- 1 November 1907: Opened as Denville Halt
- December 1907: Renamed Warblington Halt
- 5 May 1969: Renamed Warblington

Passengers
- 2021/22: ▲19,292
- 2022/23: ▲22,674
- 2023/24: ▲28,036
- 2024/25: ▲34,634
- 2025/26: ▲36,670
Location
Notes
- Passenger statistics from the Office of Rail and Road

Warblington railway station serves the Warblington and Denvilles suburbs of Havant in Hampshire.

It is located on the West Coastway Line which runs between Brighton and Southampton, 36 miles 66 chains (36.83 miles, 59.26 km) from Brighton. Situated opposite Warblington School, the station lies very close to a major road junction: the point at which the A259 coast road leaves the A27. Standing on the platform at the station entrance end it is possible to see the platforms of Havant railway station a short straight-line distance away.

== History ==
The railway line between Brighton and Portsmouth was built in stages, and the section between Chichester and Havant was opened on 15 March 1847, and there were two intermediate stations, at Bosham and Emsworth. Other stations were opened later, several coinciding with the introduction of steam rail-motor services between Portsmouth and Chichester by the London, Brighton and South Coast Railway on 11 June 1906. One such station, named Denville Halt, was opened on 1 November 1907; the following month this was renamed Warblington Halt. On 5 May 1969 it was simplified to Warblington.

== Services ==
All services at Warblington are operated by Southern using Class 377 EMUs.

The typical off-peak service in trains per hour is:

- 1 tph to London Victoria via Horsham
- 1 tph to Portsmouth Harbour

Additional services, including trains to and from Brighton via Worthing call at the station during the peak hours.

On Sundays, eastbound services run to and from Brighton instead of London Victoria.

Preceding station	National Rail	Following station
Emsworth	Southern West Coastway Line	Havant

== Gallery ==
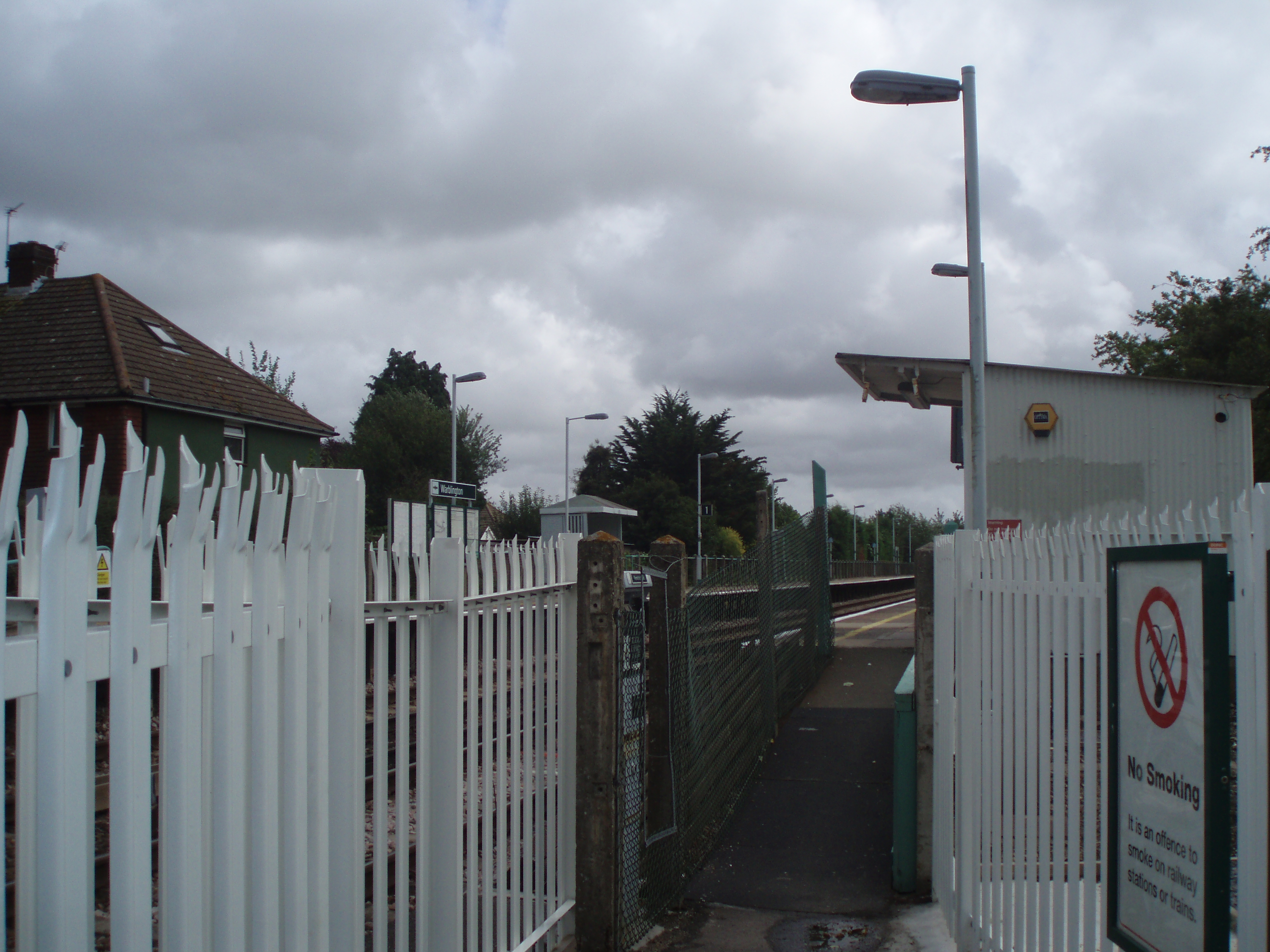
The station entrance

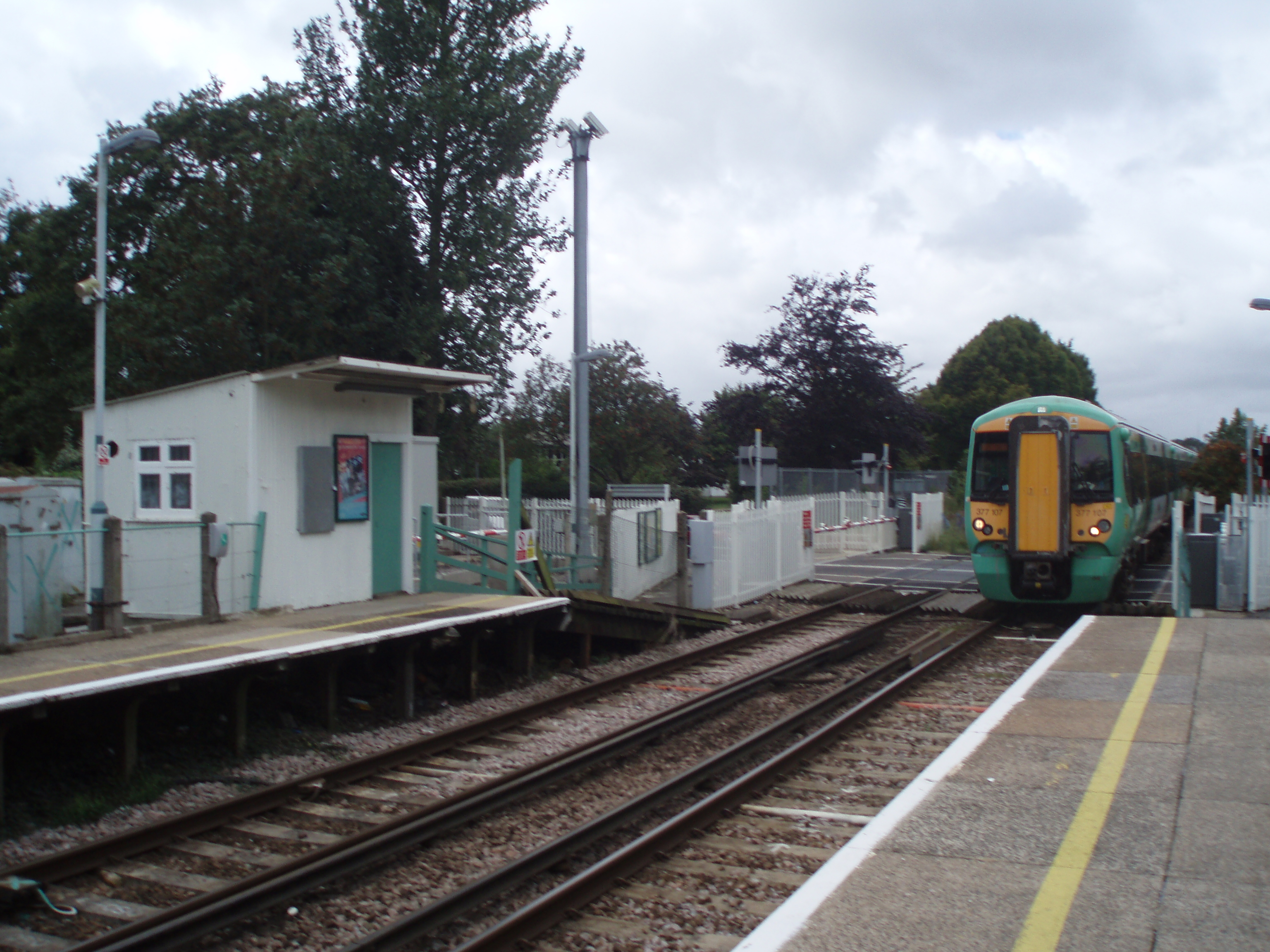
An up train

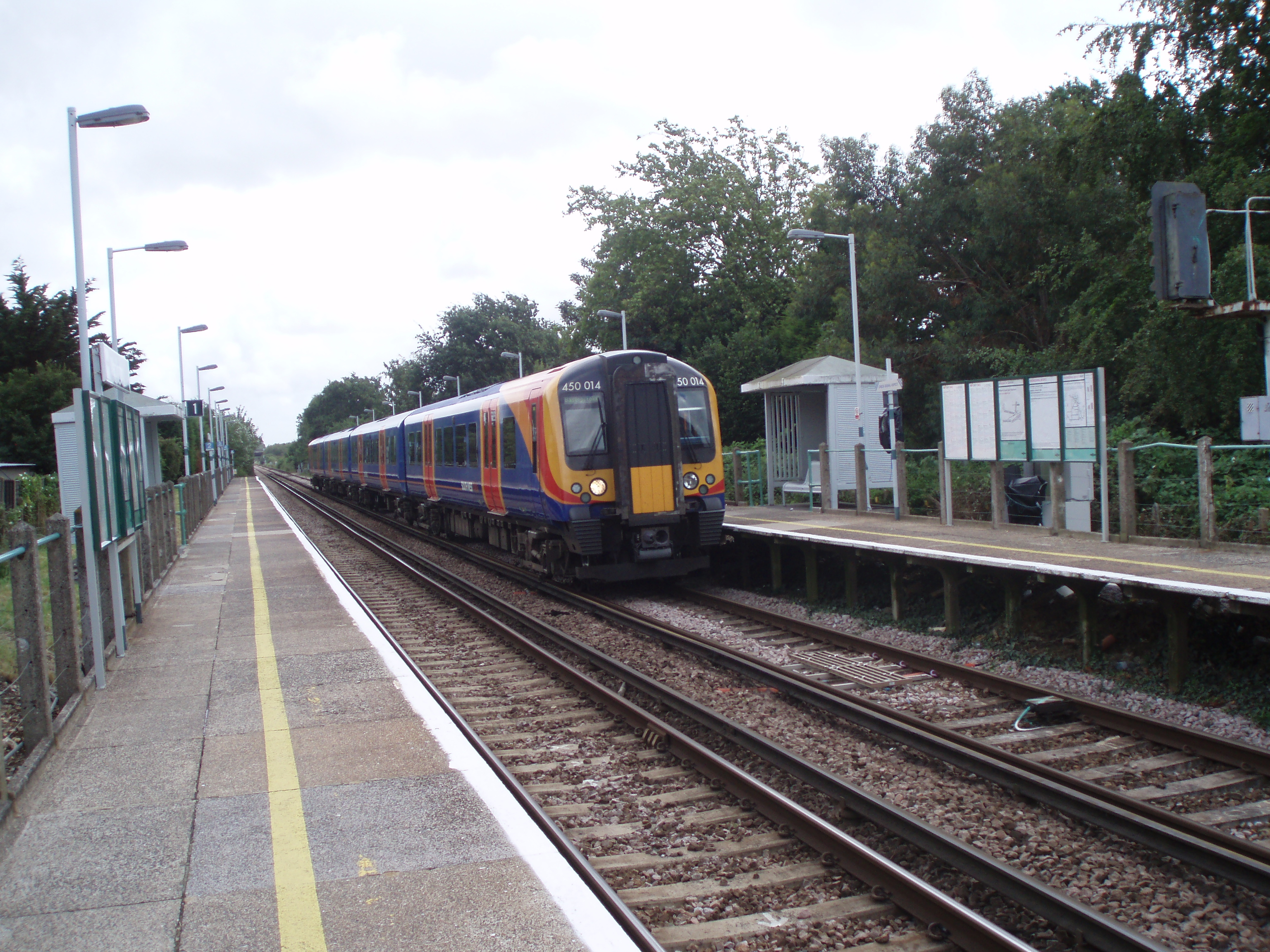
A down train

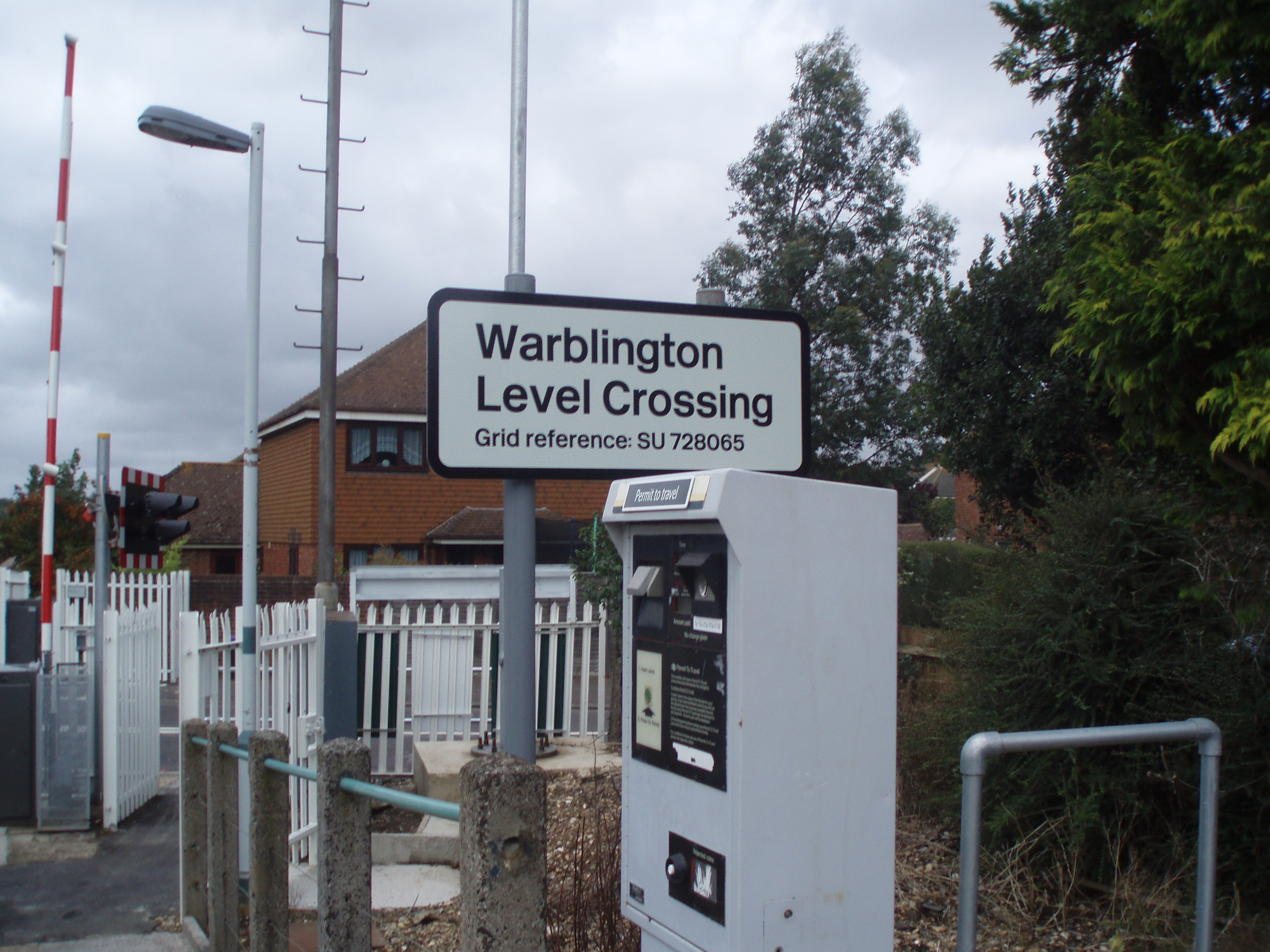
The level crossing

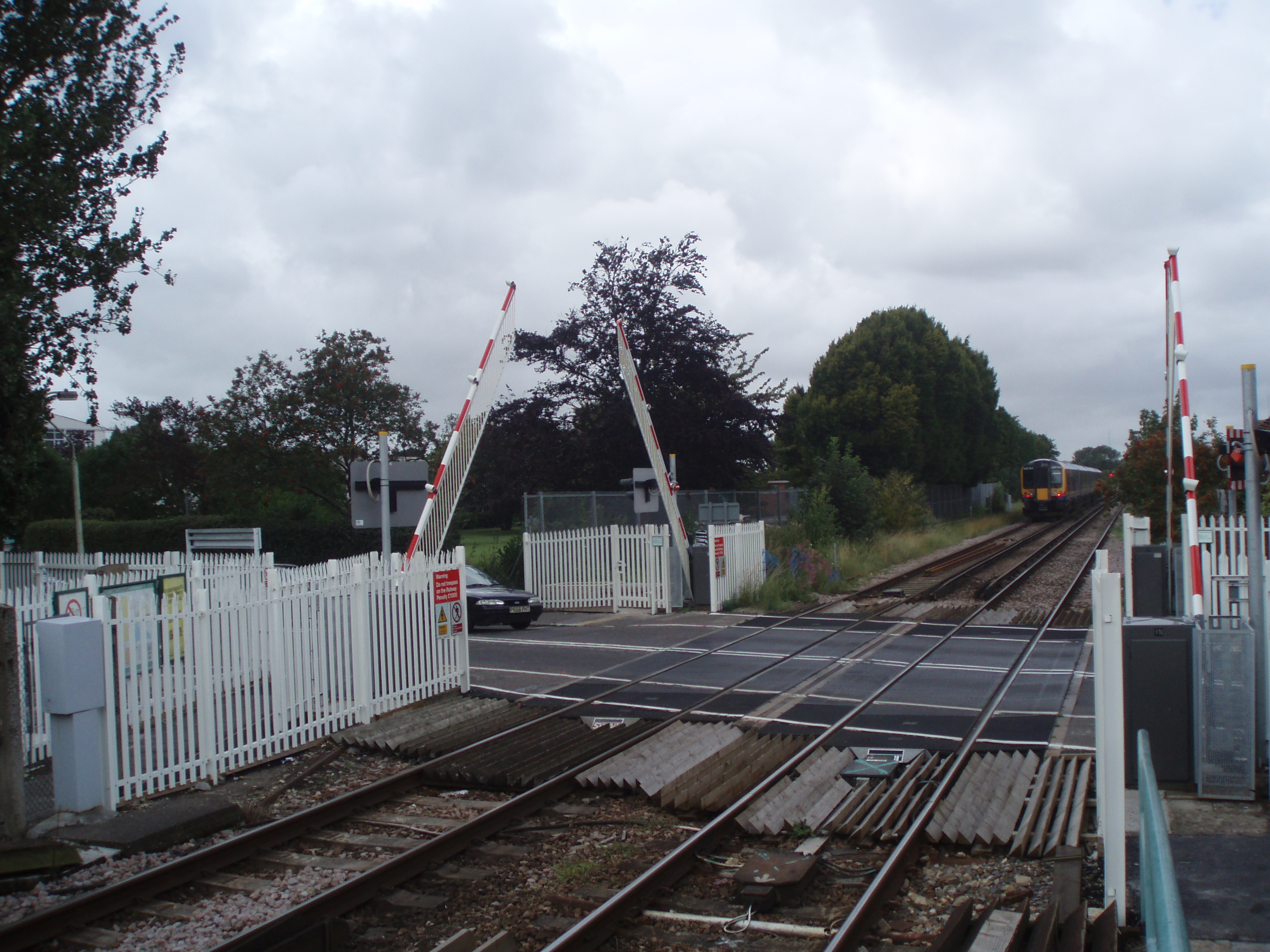
The barriers rising

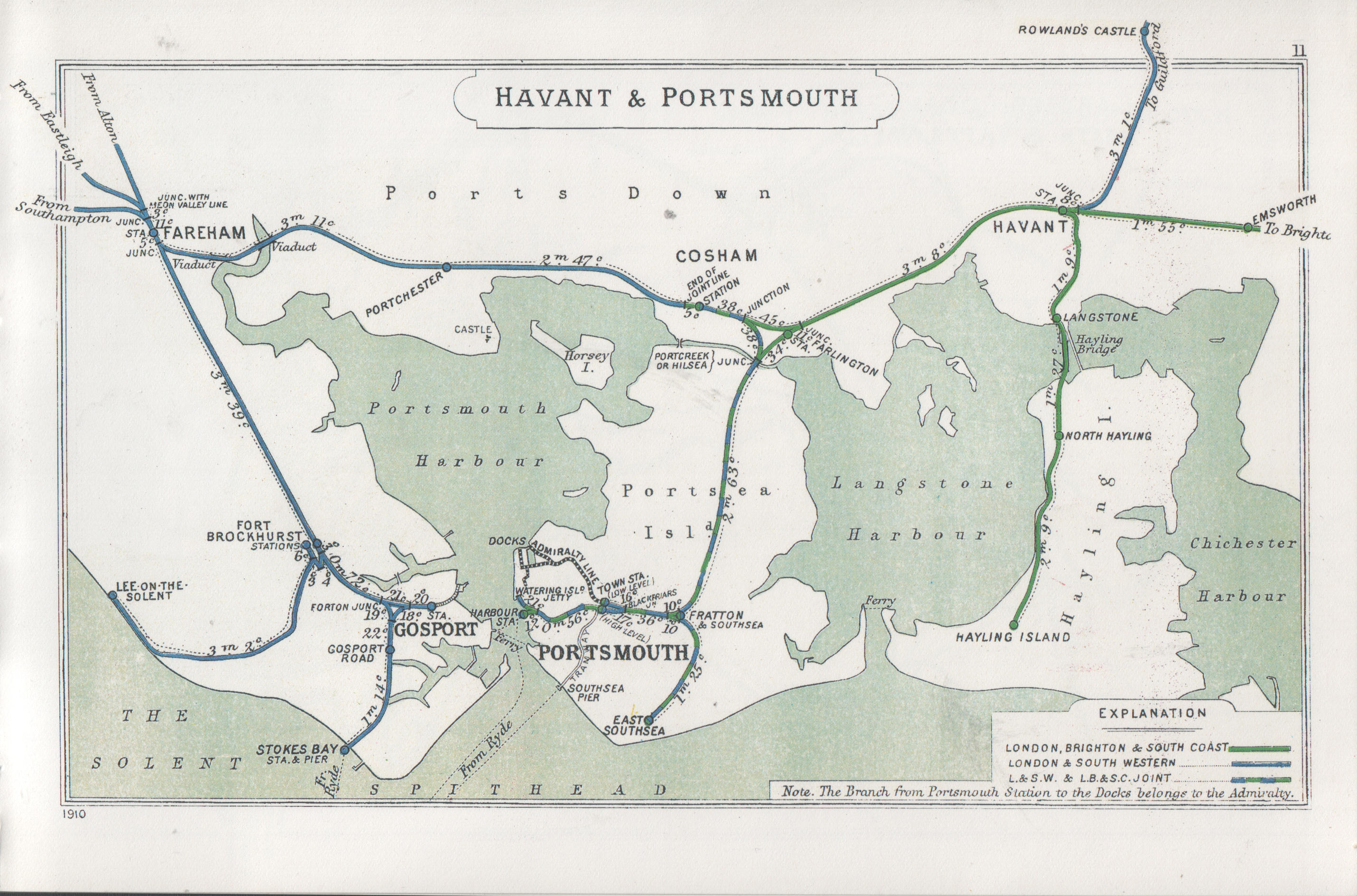
A 1910 Railway Clearing House map of lines around Warblington railway station

Entrance to Warblington railway Station in 2025
