= Terror (boat) =

History

United Kingdom
- Name: Terror
- Builder: Fosters, Emsworth
- Launched: c. 1890
- Status: In service

General characteristics
- Length: 29 ft 0 in (8.84 m)
- Beam: 9 ft 6 in (2.90 m)
- Depth: 2 ft 6 in (0.76 m)

Terror was an open sailing boat built around 1890 and used for conveying oysters around Chichester Harbour. It is believed to have been one of a number built by Foster's in Emsworth c. 1890.

== History ==
At around 29 ft (8.83 m) long, 9 ft 6 in (2.90 m) in beam and 2 ft 6 in (76.2 cm) deep, Terror was used in the oyster fishery of Chichester Harbour as a lighter to transport oysters from larger vessels to the shore until the fisheries rapid decline after 1902.

She had a number of private owners throughout the 20th century until purchased in 2004 by Chichester Harbour Conservancy and restored at Dolphin quay Boat Yard, Emsworth, with the help of a lottery grant. The restoration was completed and the boat was re-launched in September 2006. From May 2007, Terror will be sailing once again from Emsworth and will give public trips to experience life as an oyster fisherman first-hand.

The boat is now managed by the Friends of Chichester Harbour and run by a volunteer committee.
