= Warblington =

Suburb of Havant, Hampshire, England

Coordinates: 50.85°N 0.9689°W

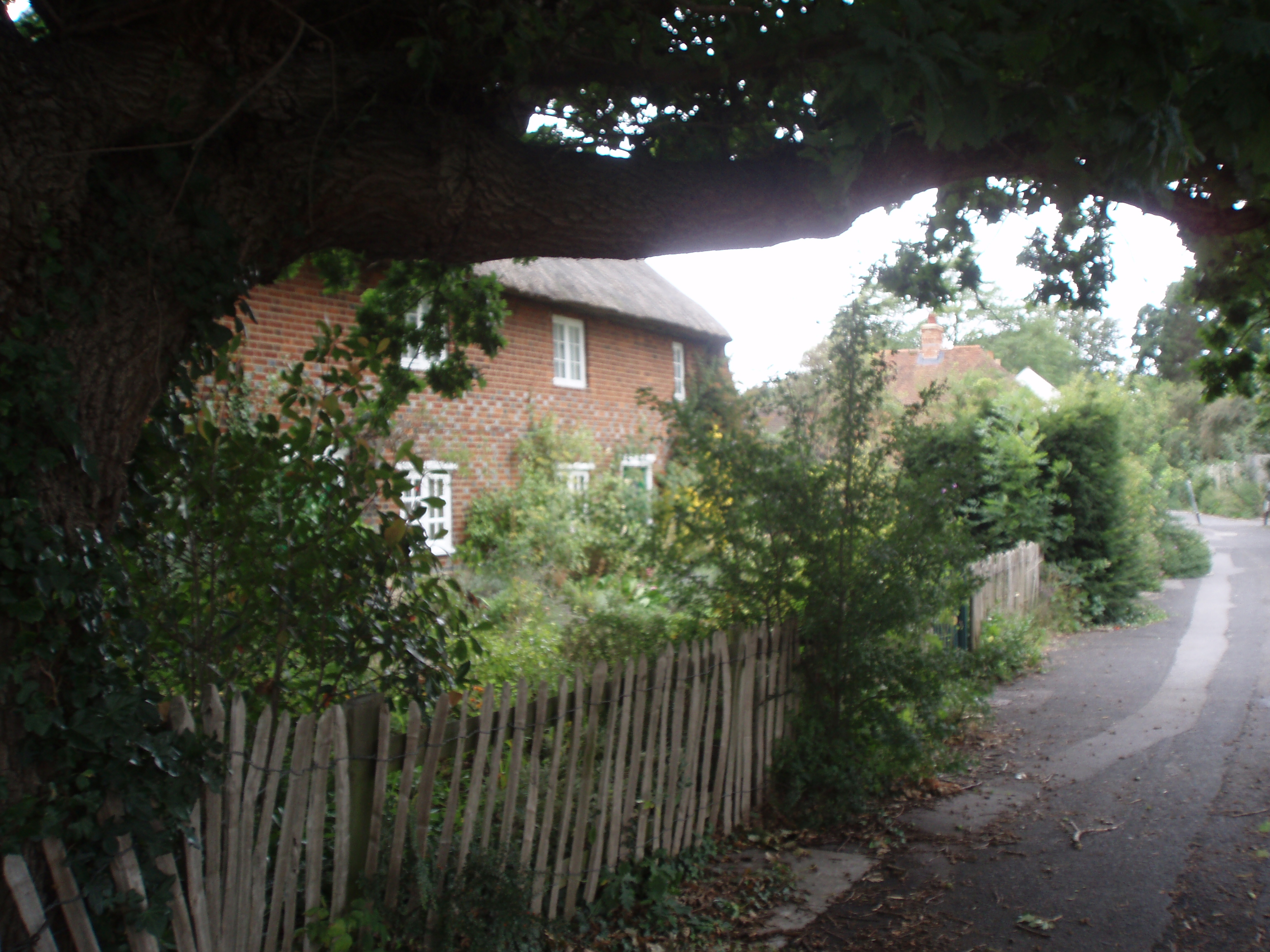
- An older house in Warblington, which was partly destroyed by fire in May 2011

- Location within Hampshire
- OS grid reference: SU725065
- District: Havant
- Shire county: Hampshire
- Region: South East
- Country: England
- Sovereign state: United Kingdom
- Post town: HAVANT
- Postcode district: PO9
- Dialling code: 023
- Police: Hampshire and Isle of Wight
- Fire: Hampshire and Isle of Wight
- Ambulance: South Central
- UK Parliament: Havant

Warblington is a suburb of Havant, in the county of Hampshire, England. Warblington used to be a civil parish, and before that was part of the Hundred of Bosmere.

== Etymology ==
In Saxon times there was a farm (OE: tun) possibly owned by a woman called OE: Wæ̃rblið who gave her name to the village. There are some alternatives eg: 'the farm (OE: tun) of Wæ̃rblealds'.

The current Warblington Castle Farm occupies the approximate site of the original farm.

== History ==
=== Pre-Roman ===
In prehistoric and early historical times the River Ems was tidal as far as Westbourne and the Westbrook creek reached to Victoria Road, leaving Emsworth almost isolated at high tide. A series of trackways that developed into a coastal route led from Hayling Island through Havant and Rowlands Castle to the South Downs. A part of the coastal route followed the Portsdown ridgeway and from Chichester to Belmont Hill in Bedhampton probably skirted the heads of the various creeks which entered the harbour, passing through country still covered with the original thick forest of oak and beech.

=== Roman ===
The system of trackways was improved by the Romans. The road from Noviomagus Reginorum ran along the south coast to Bedhampton and from there over Portsdown Hill to the Meon Valley. A villa existed to the south of the road, in the fields of what is now Warblington Castle Farm. Archaeological finds show that the building was a sizeable brick and stone edifice, with floors paved with red brick and coloured sandstone and a view of the harbour and wooded shores of Hayling Island. The fertile landscape suggests the area to have been under continuous cultivation for 1500-1800 years.

=== Anglo-Saxon ===
After the departure of the Romans, Warblington became part of Meonwara, an area that was settled by Jutes and according to the Venerable Bede :

" Those who came over were of the three most powerful nations of Germany—Saxons, Angles, and Jutes. From the Jutes are descended the people of Kent, and of the Isle of Wight, and those also in the province of the West Saxons who are to this day called Jutes, seated opposite to the Isle of Wight."

— Bede 1910, 1.15

In the 7th century Meonwara was absorbed into the Kingdom of Wessex and Saint Birinius converted Wessex to Christianity. In Warblington the Anglo-Saxons constructed a church where they could worship. The current St Thomas à Becket Church, Warblington occupies the same site as the old church and still retains some elements of the old structure.

Charters were granted by Kings Æthelstan and Æthelred in AD 935 (Note: S.430. A.D. 935. King Athelstan to Wihtgar, minister; lease, for four lives, of 7 hides (mansae) at Havant, Hants.) and 980 (Note: S 837. A.D. 980. King Æthelred to the monks of Old Minster, Winchester; grant of the reversion of 7 hides (cassati) at Havant, Hants., which had been granted by King Athelstan to Wihtgar, his thegn, for four lives (cf. S 430).) establishing and confirming boundaries of Warblington. From AD 980-1066 the manor was held by Godwin, Earl of Wessex and his son Harold Godwinson.

=== Medieval ===
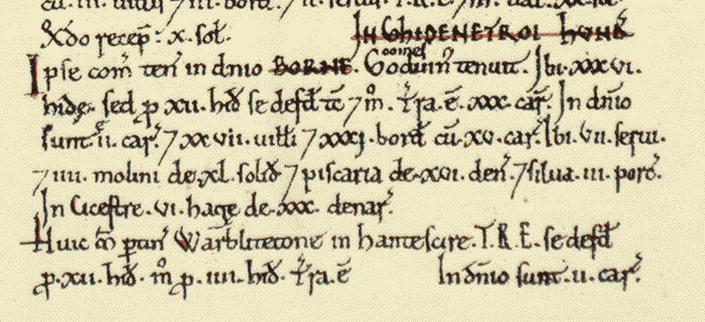
Part of the Warblitetone (Warblington) entry in the Domesday Book.

After the Norman Conquest, the Manor of Warblington was given to Roger de Montgomery, Earl of Shrewsbury as part of the manor of Westbourne. The Domesday Book lists the latter with two churches (one of the churches was actually at Westbourne), a mill, 29 families and two slaves (about 120 people). There were also seven plough teams, indicating about 850 acres (340 ha) of land under cultivation.

In the 1400s, the people were removed and the area became a private deer park for Richard Neville, 16th Earl of Warwick who then owned the manor.

The village originally was the site of a moated manor, built between 1515 and 1525, by Margaret Pole, Countess of Salisbury. Margaret was arrested in the manor at the end of 1538 for her part in the so-called Exeter Conspiracy. Two and half years later she was executed and the Manor of Warblington was granted to Sir Richard Cotton by Edward VI. In October 1551, Mary of Guise the widow of James V of Scotland stayed a night in the manor as a guest of Cotton. The building, now known as Warblington Castle, was mostly destroyed in 1644, during the English Civil War. All that remains is a single gate tower, part of a wall, and a gateway. Located north of the church, the tower is the locality's most distinctive landmark, and probably avoided destruction so that it could remain as a navigational landmark.

=== Modern ===
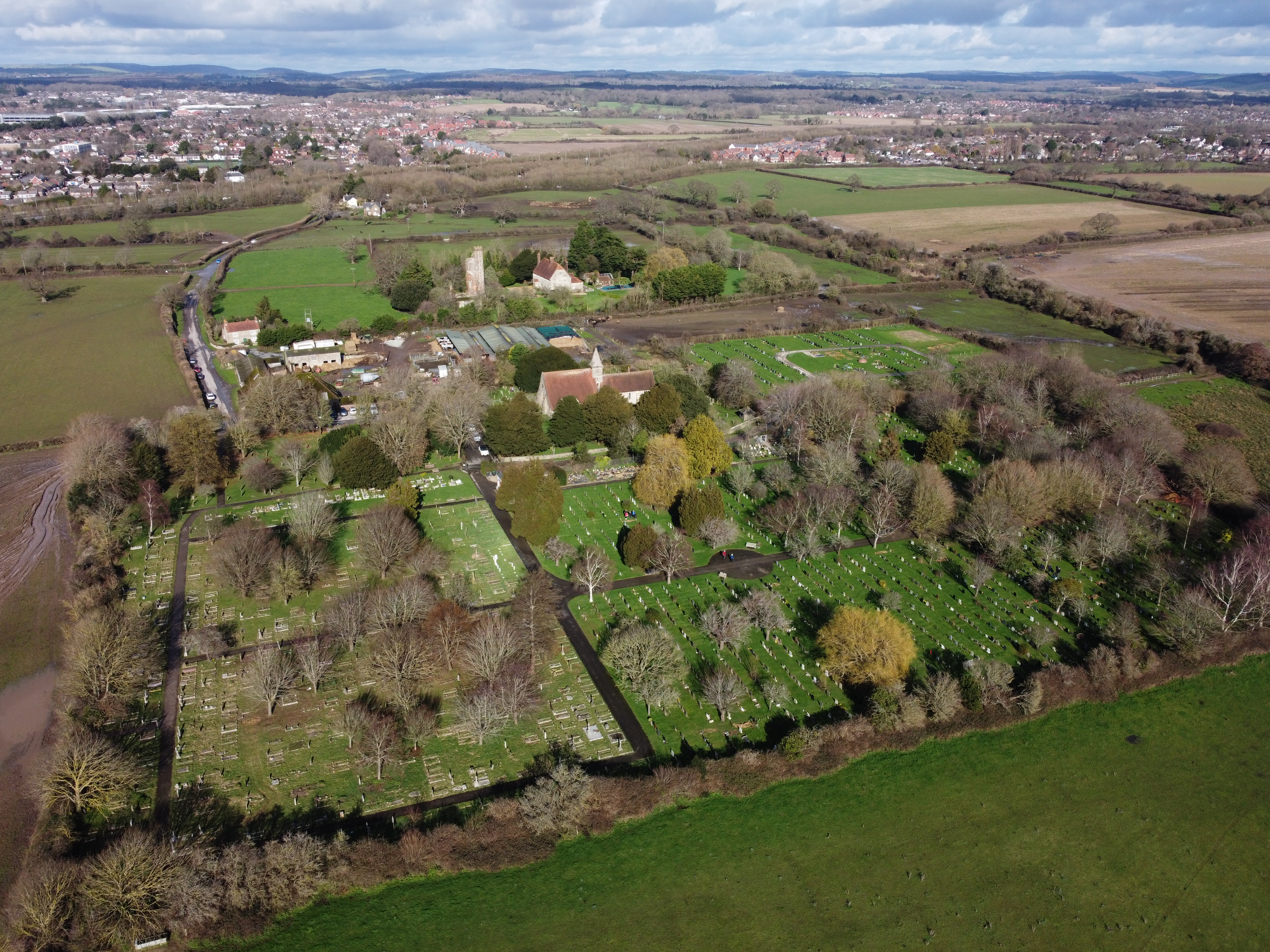
Aerial view of Warblington, with the cemetery in the foreground.

The Imperial Gazetteer of 1870-1872 described Warblington as having a population of 2,196 as of 1861 and mentioned that the "church is Saxon".

The parish church of St Thomas à Becket is part of a joint parish with the church of St James, Emsworth. The oldest part of the church is the small central tower, which is Saxon and was built in the 11th century. In 1967 Pevsner and Lloyd described St Thomas à Becket church as essentially late 12th century and notes the "undisturbed" setting.

Warblington railway station was opened on 1 November 1906, by the then London, Brighton and South Coast Railway. It was initially named "Denville Halt" but was renamed as "Warblington Halt" about one month after it opened. From 1969 the station has been known as "Warblington" and is part of the West Coastway Line that runs from Brighton to Southampton.

Warblington contains a large secondary school (Warblington School) but no primary school.

Green Pond Corner used to be the local pond. The "corner group" also included Warblington House and Warblington Farm according to records from 1870. The pond was covered over around 1920 and now hosts the One Stop corner shop and local glass and fabric recycling point.

In 1931 the civil parish had a population of 4321. On 1 April 1932 the parish was abolished and merged with Havant and Rowlands Castle.It is now in the unparished area of Havant and Waterloo, in the Havant district.

The Havant Borough Council, on their website, declare that "Areas and individual buildings of 'special architectural or historic interest' can be designated as conservation areas to protect their heritage against detrimental development." Havant Borough Council identify fourteen such areas in the borough, the Warblington Conservation Area being just one. The Warblington conservation area centres on the Grade I Listed St Thomas à Becket Church, Warblington and includes a cemetery, the ruins of Grade II listed Warblington Castle, a Grade II listed Old Farmhouse, and the Grade II listed Old Rectory.

== Notable residents ==
- Sir Peter Blake (1 October 1948 – 5 December 2001), sailor, buried in Warblington cemetery
- John Brown (1820 – unknown), cricketer born in Warblington
- George Carter (1846–1911), cricketer
- James Norris, President of Corpus Christi College, Oxford, 1843–1872

== Gallery ==
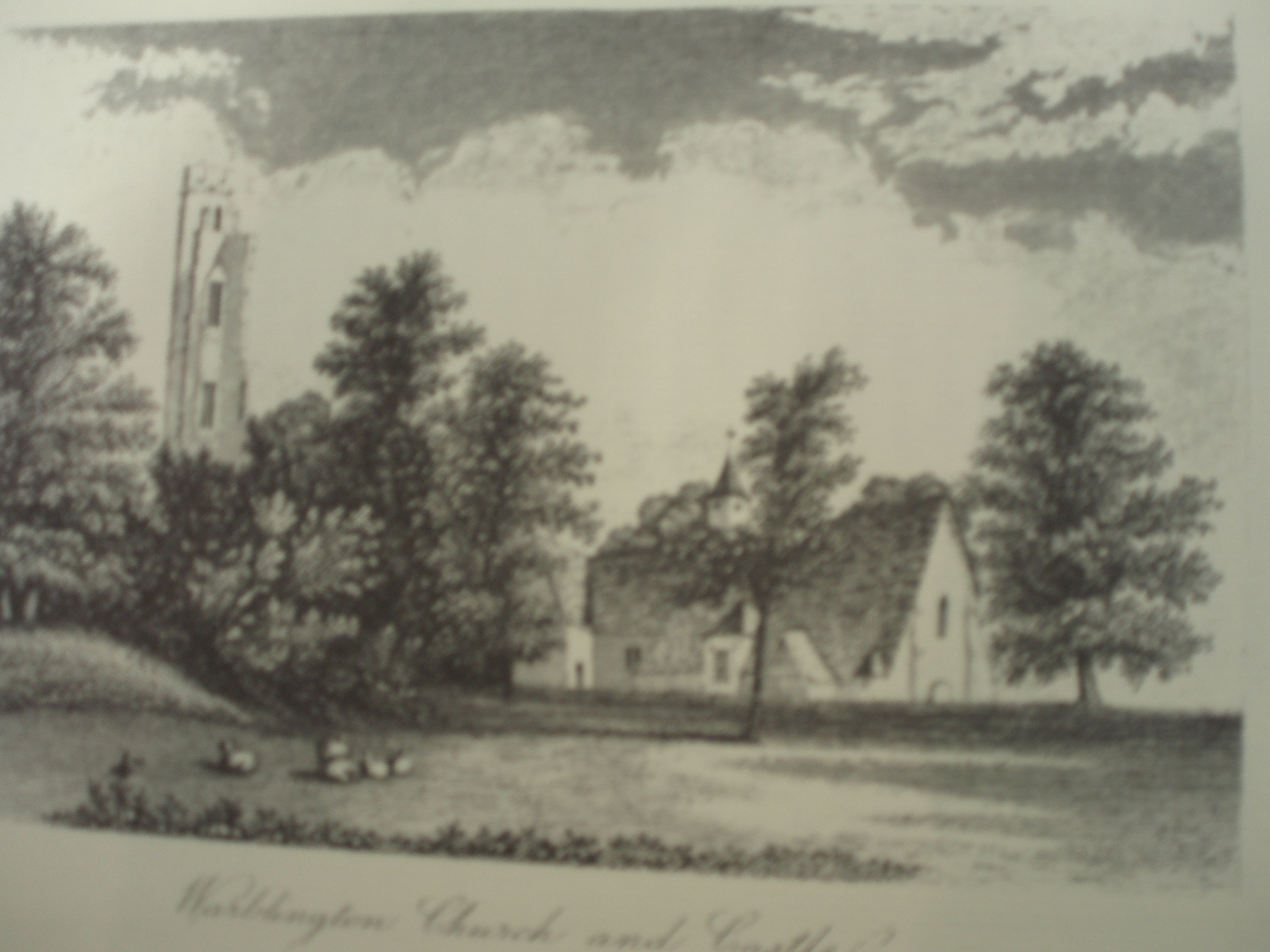
1856 etching of castle and church

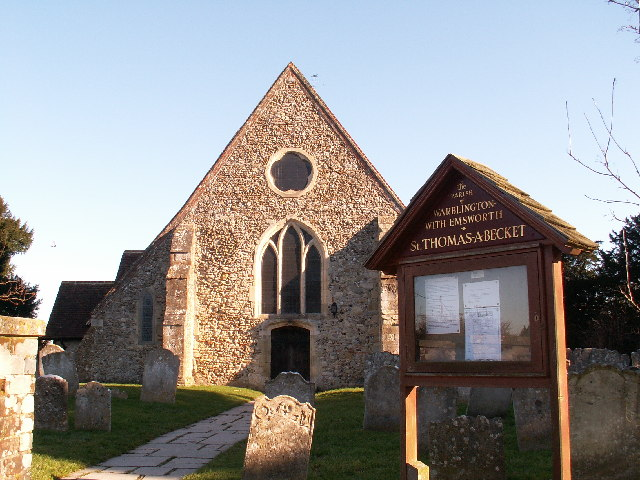
Warblington church

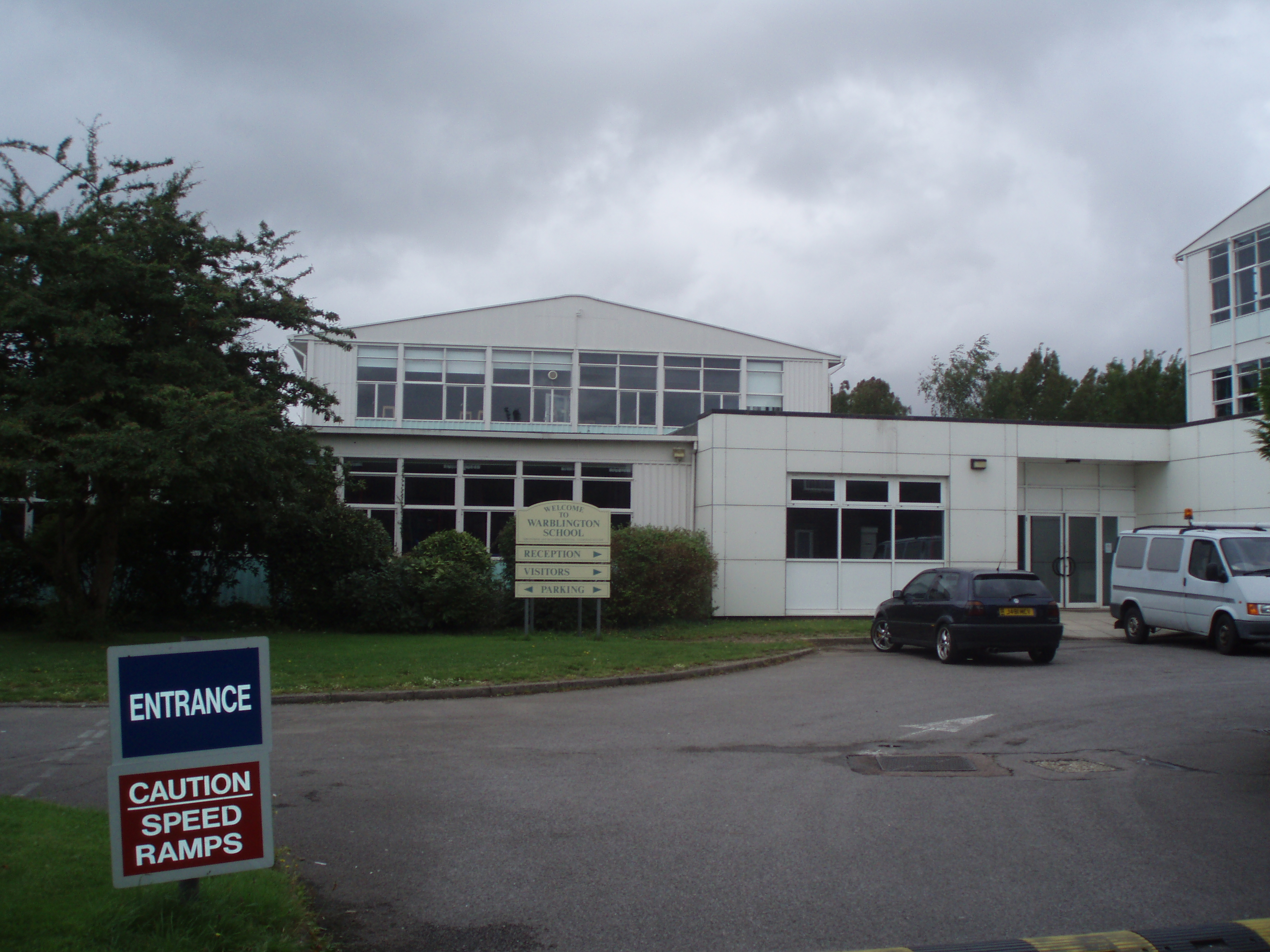
Secondary School

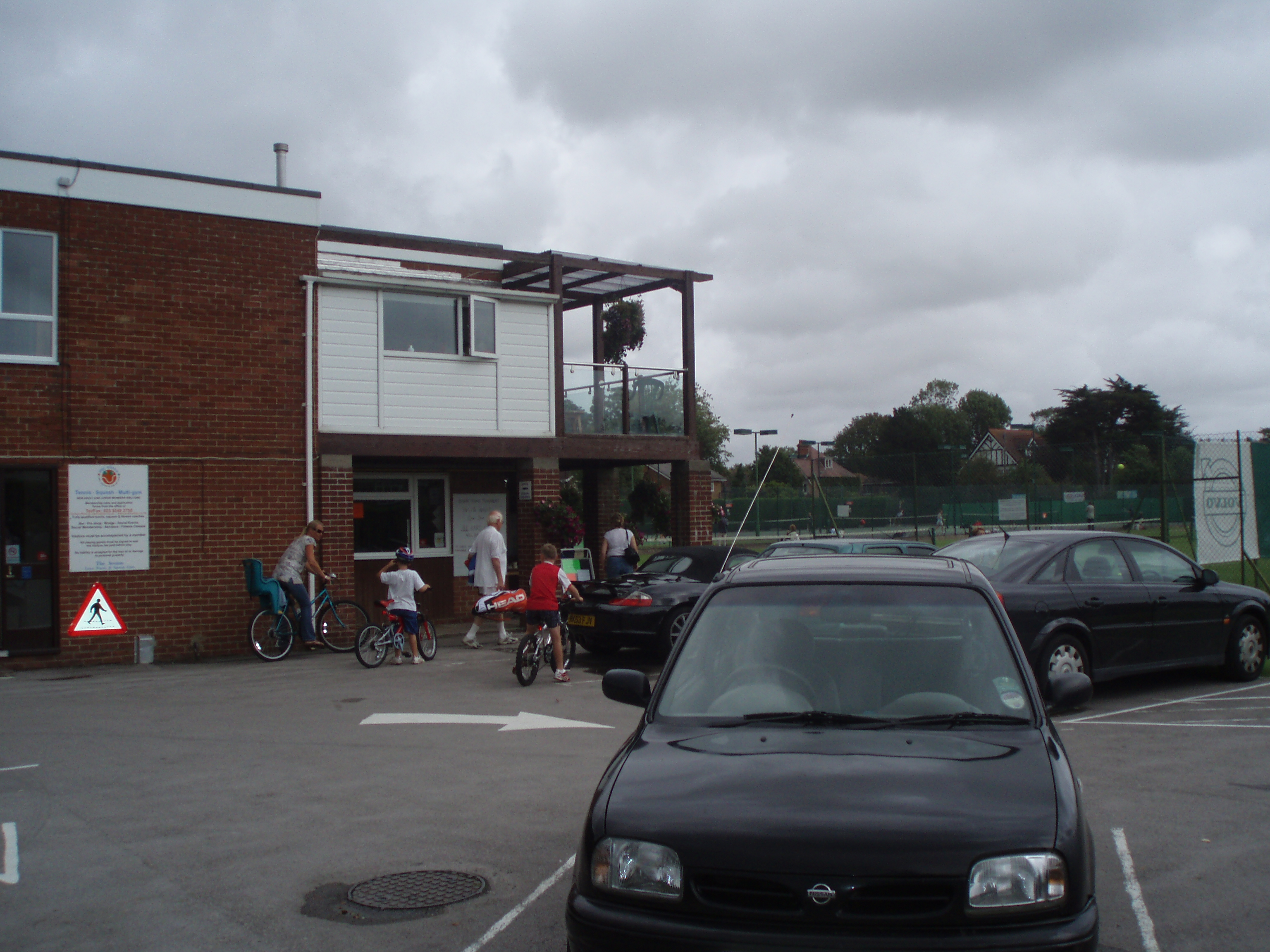
Tennis Club

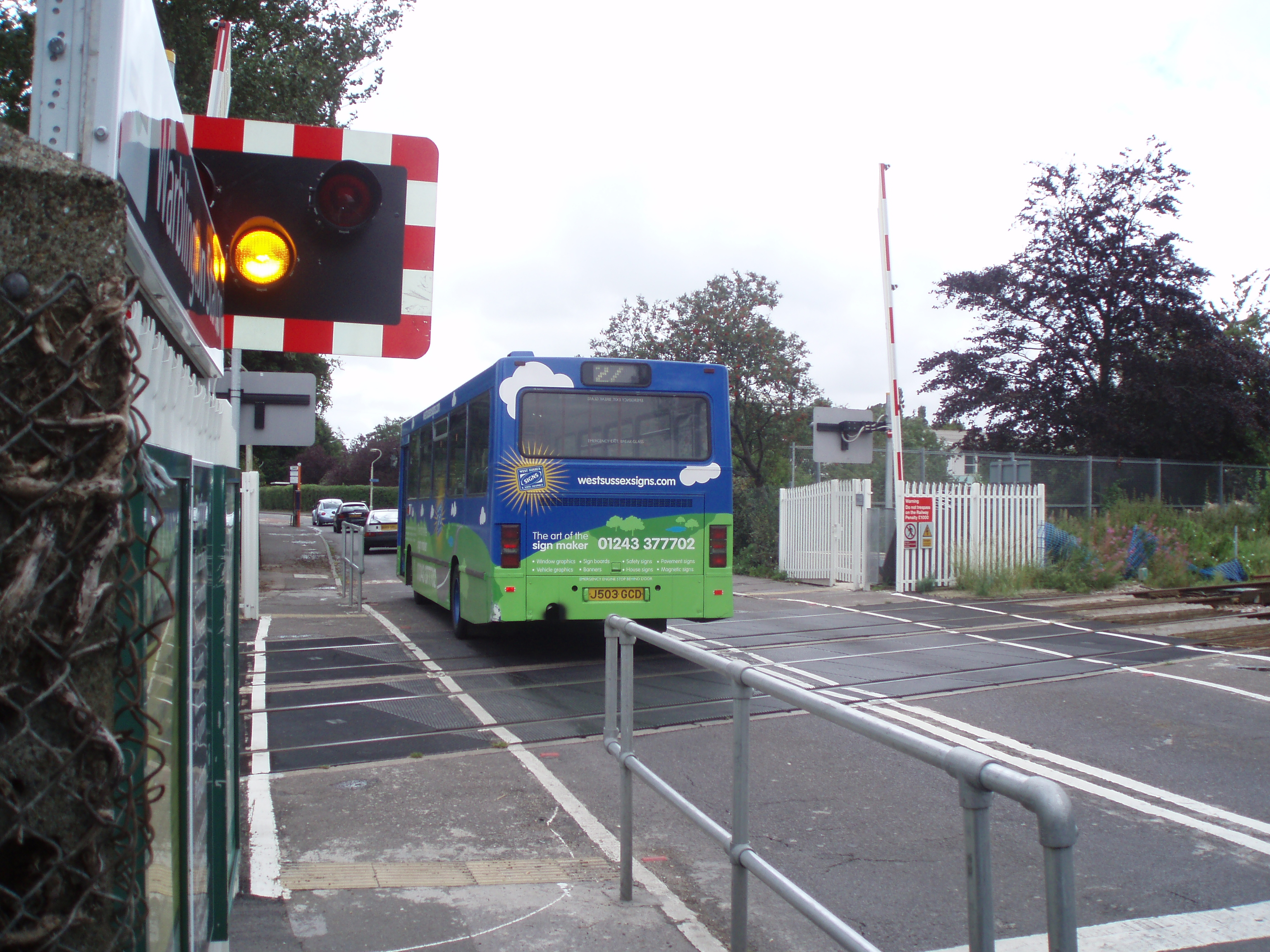
Level Crossing

== See also ==
- Warblington Meadow

== Bibliography ==
- Barron, William (1985). The Castles of Hampshire & Isle of Wight. Paul Cave Publications. p. 50. ISBN 0-86146-048-0.
- Bede (1910). Ecclesiastical History of the English People . Translated by Jane, L. C.; Sellar, A. M. – via Wikisource.
- Brandon, Peter, ed. (1978). The South Saxons. Chichester: Phillimore. ISBN 978-0-85033-240-7.
- Cousins, Ralph; Rogers, Margaret (2017). Brief History of the Railway in Havant & The Arrival of the Railway in Emsworth. Havant Borough Council. OCLC 1001989294.
- Ekwall, Eilert (1991). The Concise Oxford Dictionary of English Place Names (4 ed.). OUP. p. 497. ISBN 0-19-869103-3.
- Hampshire Gardens Trust (2001). "Warblington Castle". Hampshire Gardens Trust.
- Greenslade, Ken (2023). "Warblington". Genuki.
- HCC (2022). "Section 6.1.2". Warblington with Emsworth & notes on Rowland's Castle (PDF). Hampshire County Council.
- HBC (2004). "Warblington Conservation Area" (PDF). Havant Borough Council.
- Historic England. "The Old Rectory (Grade II) (1303444)". National Heritage List for England.
- Historic England. "Warblington Castle Famhouse (sic) (Grade II) (1091613)". National Heritage List for England.
- Historic England. "Church of St Thomas-a-Becket (Grade I) (1154443)". National Heritage List for England.
- KCL (2022). "The Electronic Sawyer". London: King's College London.
- Lloyd, David (1974). Buildings of Portsmouth and its Environs. Portsmouth: City of Portsmouth. p. 23. ISBN 978-0901559531.
- Lewis, Tandy (2022). "Warblington School". Locrating.
- One Stop (2022). "One Stop, Warblington".
- Pevsner, Nikolaus; Lloyd, David (1967). Hampshire and the Isle of Wight. The Buildings of England. Harmondsworth: Penguin Books. pp. 639–641. ISBN 0-14-071032-9.
- Powell-Smith (1086). "Open Domesday: Warblington". Hull University.
- Reger, A J C (2016). A Short History of Emsworth and Warblington. Booklet Number 6. Hampshire: Havant Borough Council. OCLC 499724544.
- Parish of Warblington with Emsworth (2022). "Welcome to the Parish of Warblington–with–Emsworth]". Parish of Warblington with Emsworth PCC.
- Turnbull, William B, ed. (1861). "Edward VI: November 1551," in Calendar of State Papers Foreign: Edward VI 1547-1553". London: British History Online. pp. 188–200.
- Vision of Britain (2025a). "Population statistics Warblington CP/AP through time". University of Portsmouth.
- Vision of Britain (2025b). "Relationships and changes Warblington CP/AP through time". University of Portsmouth.
- Yorke, Barbara (1995). Wessex in the Early Middle Ages. A&C Black. pp. 36–43. ISBN 978-0-7185-1856-1.
