= William Whitcher =

English cricketer (1832–1910)

Personal information
- Born: c. 1832; Emsworth, Hampshire, England
- Died: 9 March 1910 (aged 77–78); Southampton, Hampshire, England

Domestic team information
- Years: Team
- 1864–1867: Hampshire

Career statistics
Competition	First-class
Matches	2
Runs scored	27
Batting average	13.50
100s/50s	0/0
Top score	17*
Balls bowled	48
Wickets	0
Bowling average	–
5 wickets in innings	–
10 wickets in match	–
Best bowling	–
Catches/stumpings	0/–
- Source: Cricinfo, 1 January 2009

William Whitcher (c. 1832 — 3 March 1910) was an English first-class cricketer.

Whitcher was born in about 1832 at Emsworth, Hampshire. He made his debut in first-class cricket for Hampshire in 1864, which was the club's first season with first-class status. This came against Sussex. In this match he bowled 5 wicket-less overs in the Sussex first-innings. In Hampshire's first-innings, he ended the innings unbeaten without scoring. Having batted at number 10 in the first-innings, he opened the batting in Hampshire's second-innings. This promotion up the order was not successful, with Whitcher being run out for a duck. Sussex eventually won the match by 10 wickets. He next appeared in first-class cricket for Hampshire in 1867, when he played his final first-class match against Kent. He scored his first first-class runs in Hampshire's first-innings, making 10 runs before being dismissed by George Bennett. In the second-innings he ended the innings unbeaten on 17. Whitcher bowled in the Kent first-innings, bowling 7 wicket-less overs. The match ended in a draw.

Whitcher died at Shirley in Southampton in March 1910.
