= Denvilles =

Neighbourhood of Havant, Hampshire, England

Coordinates: 50.855°N 0.965°W

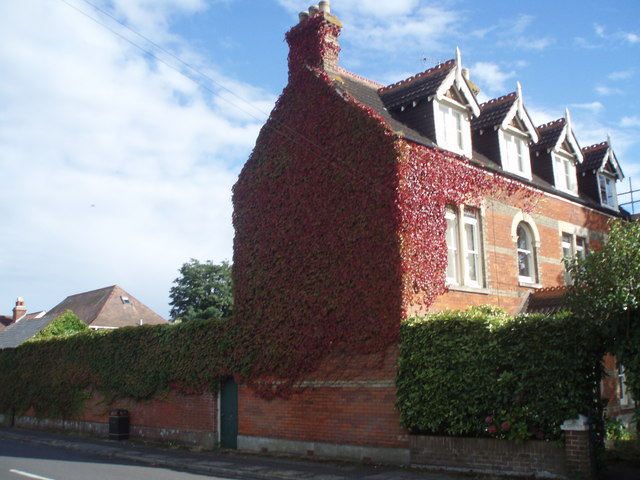

- Location within Hampshire
- OS grid reference: SU725065
- District: Havant
- Shire county: Hampshire
- Region: South East
- Country: England
- Sovereign state: United Kingdom
- Post town: HAVANT
- Postcode district: PO9
- Dialling code: 023
- Police: Hampshire and Isle of Wight
- Fire: Hampshire and Isle of Wight
- Ambulance: South Central
- UK Parliament: Havant

Denvilles is a locality within Havant to the north of Warblington railway station. In 1877 it consisted of a solitary farm but by 1897 there were several roads of detached residences. Slowly the area grew, and in the 1960s it doubled in size as smaller housing estates for private ownership were built. The area has a small convenience store but the adjoining satellite health centre moved in July to centralised premises elsewhere. The Borough Council designates the area UA2: not a priority for extra investment.
