= John Hayward (British author) =

John Hayward is an English social campaigner and author with a background in international development. He was the Conservative candidate in Cambridge for the 2017 United Kingdom general election.

== Early life ==
Hayward grew up in Emsworth, Hampshire. Despite being born with just one arm and no legs, he earned the Queen's Scout Award after learning to ski and climb mountains. He was also awarded the Cornwell Scout Badge ("the Scout V.C.") in honour of his "pre-eminently high character and devotion to duty".

== Career ==
Hayward was an undergraduate at Christ's College, Cambridge, matriculating in 1989 and reading Natural Sciences; he went on to obtain a PhD in genetics. He has had a career in international development, founding the "Society in Tajikistan for Assistance and Research" (STAR), an adult education institute, which he directed for seven years; and helping to empower disadvantaged communities in Zimbabwe. He also gained a Master's degree from Azusa Pacific University in California and worked as the executive director of Cambridge-based social-reform think tank the Jubilee Centre, campaigning on issues such as workers' rights, national wellbeing and human rights.

In May 2017, Hayward was selected as the Conservative Party's candidate in Cambridge. At that time he was working as the professional manager of the Conservative Party's Policy Forum, the national body that enables members of the party to help shape government policy. Described during the campaign as an "impressive interlocutor", Hayward took 9,133 votes, a slight increase on the party's showing in the 2015 election; this represented 16.3% of the vote.

As part of his work, through the Westminster Foundation for Democracy, to promote greater inclusion and transparency in the political systems of newly emerging and developing democracies, Hayward has represented the Conservative Party in countries such as Bosnia and Herzegovina and Ghana. He has also served as an international election observer, including in Uzbekistan.

His 2024 collection of Advent devotions, Rediscovering the Magic of Christmas, was described by Evangelicals Now's reviewer as "one of the best Advent books I have ever read" and an "Advent tour de force".

== Publications ==
- Rediscovering the Magic of Christmas: An Advent Adventure from Genesis to Revelation (2024), London: Inter-Varsity Press ISBN 978-1-78974-514-6
- Akhbor: Understanding Tajiki news: An advanced Tajiki self-study guide (2004), Enstone: Writersworld in conjunction with STAR Publications ISBN 1-904-18157-0
- A Beginner's Guide to Tajiki (2003), London; New York: RoutledgeCurzon ISBN 0-415-31597-2
- The Official Beginners' Guide to Tajiki (2001), Dushanbe: STAR Publications ISBN 9-967-42228-9
