= Emsworth & District Motor Services =

Bus operator in southern England

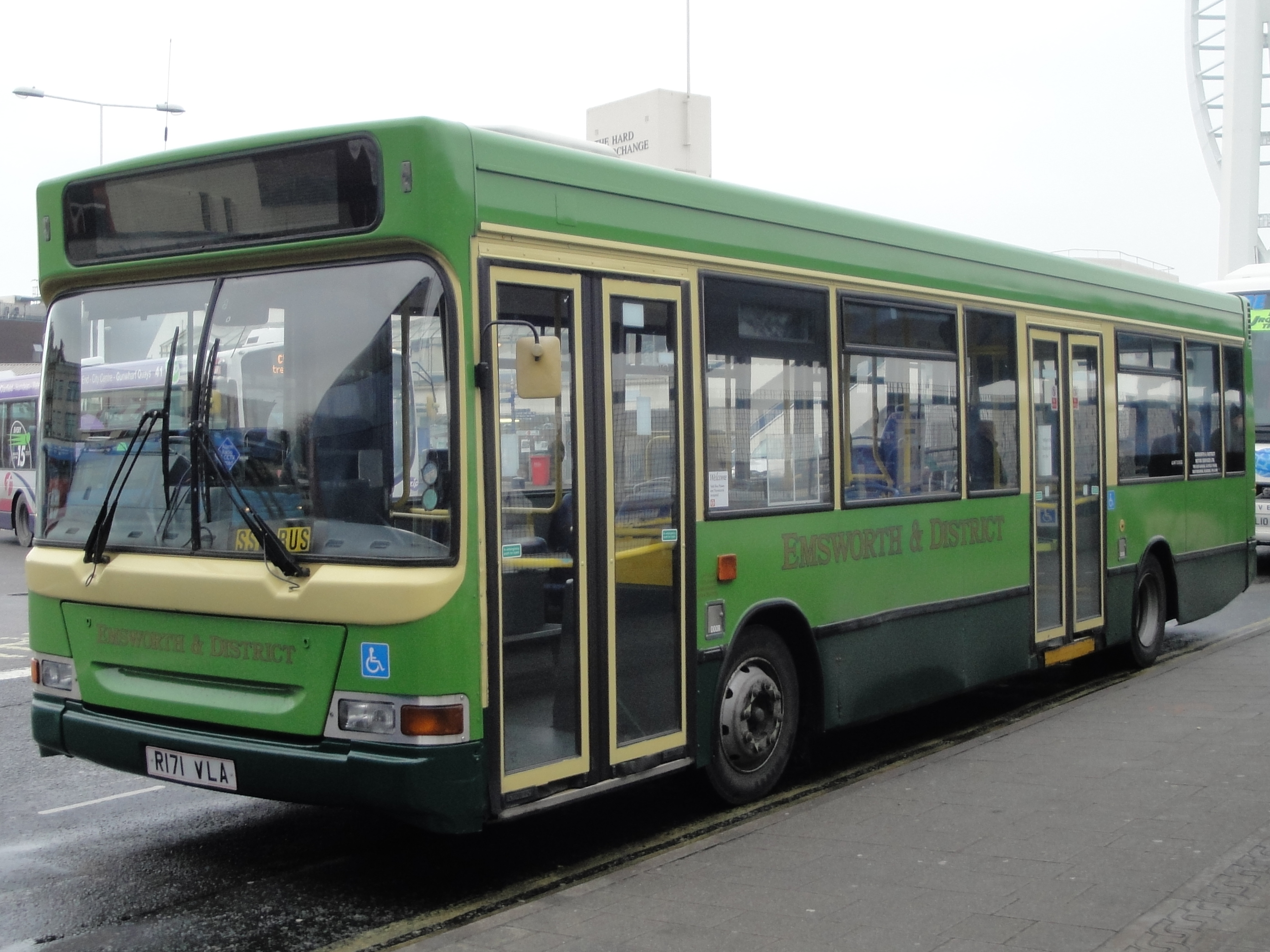
- Plaxton Pointer 2 bodied Dennis Dart SLF in Portsmouth in February 2012
- Founded: 1977; 49 years ago
- Ceased operation: 31 July 2018; 7 years ago
- Headquarters: Southbourne, West Sussex
- Service area: Hampshire; West Sussex
- Service type: Bus and coach
- Depots: 2
- Fleet: 18
- Transport Manager: Paul Lea
- Website: www.emsworthanddistrict.co.uk

Emsworth & District Motor Services, sometimes known as the Emsworth and District Bus Company, was a bus operator based near the Hampshire and West Sussex border close to Emsworth.

Established in 1977 as solely an operator of contracted school services, running buses and coaches in a green and cream livery based on the traditional livery of dominant operator Southdown Motor Services, it ceased in 2018 trading after its operating licence was revoked. At the time operations ceased, it operated 18 vehicles. Portsmouth City Coaches took on some staff, vehicles, and the Southbourne depot.
