= Emsworth railway station =

Railway station in Hampshire, England

Coordinates: 50°51′06″N 0°56′19″W

Emsworth
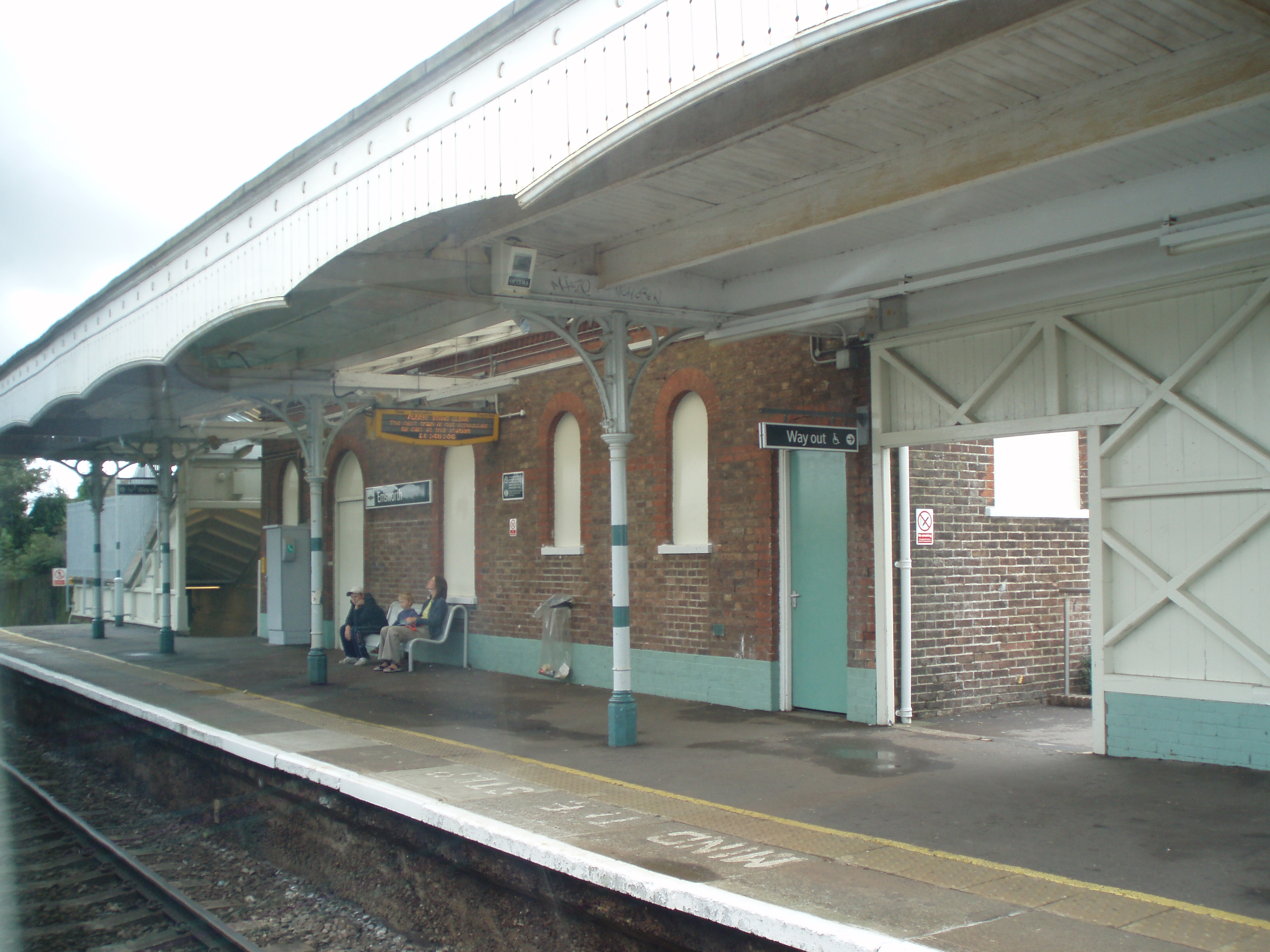

General information
- Location: Emsworth, Havant; England
- Grid reference: SU748063
- Managed by: Southern
- Platforms: 2

Other information
- Station code: EMS
- Classification: DfT category E

History
- Opened: 15 March 1847

Passengers
- 2020/21: ▼0.128 million
- Interchange: ▼1,136
- 2021/22: ▲0.281 million
- Interchange: ▲3,355
- 2022/23: ▲0.306 million
- Interchange: ▲4,049
- 2023/24: ▲0.318 million
- Interchange: ▲4,266
- 2024/25: ▲0.362 million
- Interchange: ▲5,129
Location
Notes
- Passenger statistics from the Office of Rail & Road

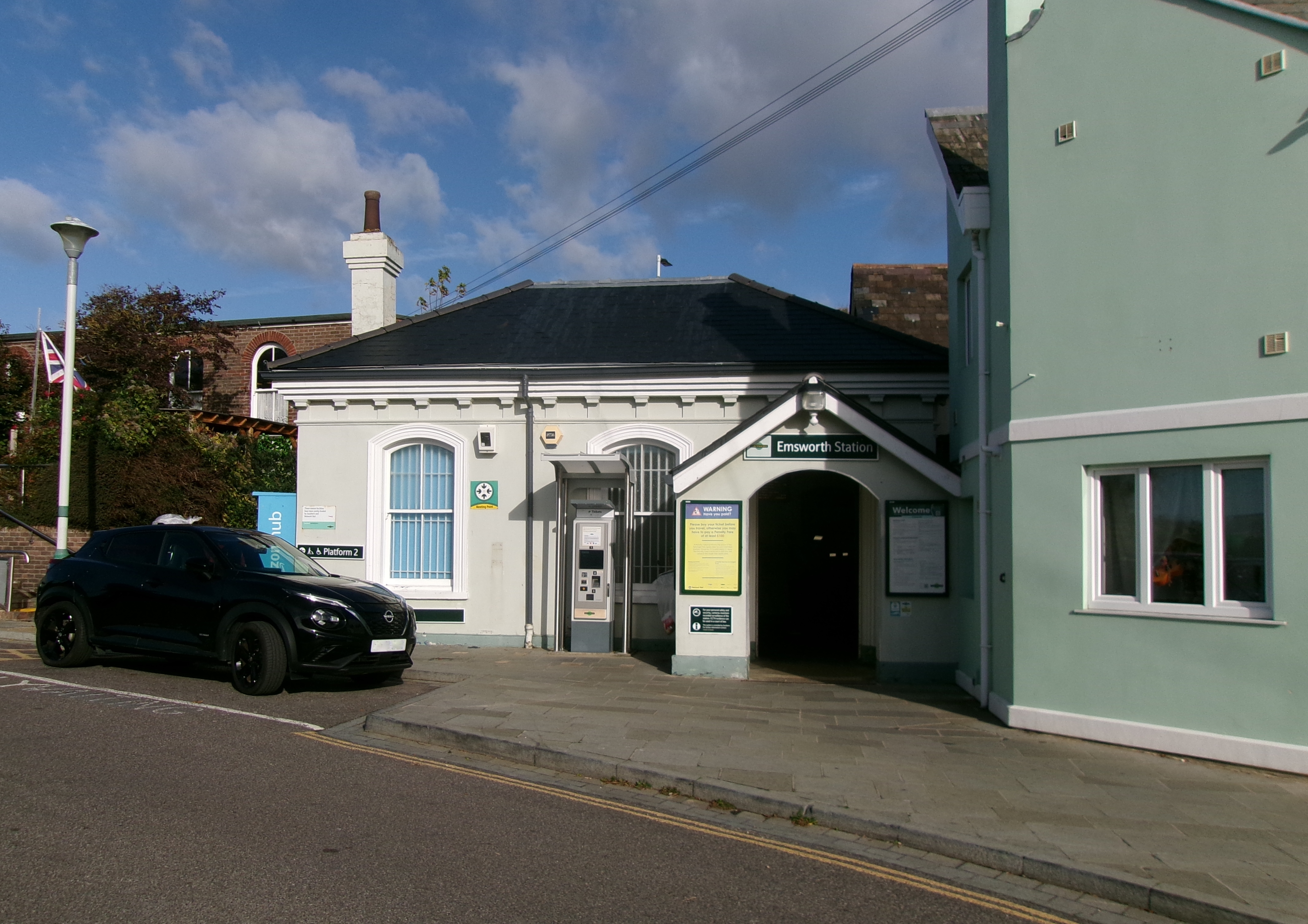
Station entrance

Emsworth railway station serves the town of Emsworth, on the Hampshire side of the border between Hampshire and West Sussex, in southern England. It is located on the West Coastway Line which runs between Brighton and Southampton, 35 miles 50 chains (35.63 miles, 57.33 km) from Brighton.

== History ==
The railway line between Brighton and Portsmouth was built in stages, and the section between Chichester and Havant was opened on 15 March 1847 with the station at Emsworth opening at the same time.

== Facilities ==
The station has a ticket office which is staffed throughout the week in the morning and early afternoon (06:40-13:15 Mon-Sat, 08:10-15:45 Sun). At other times, the station is unstaffed and tickets can be purchased from the self-service ticket machine during these times. The station also has toilets which are open when the station is staffed.

The station has passenger help points and seated areas on both platforms as a waiting room which is open when the station is staffed.

The station has a small cycle rack and a small (free) car park at the entrance which is operated by APCOA parking.

Step-free access is available to both the platforms at Emsworth.

== Services ==
All services at Emsworth are operated by Southern using 377 EMUs.

The typical off-peak service in trains per hour is:

- 2 tph to London Victoria via Horsham
- 2 tph to Brighton via Worthing
- 2 tph to Southampton Central
- 2 tph to Portsmouth Harbour

Preceding station	National Rail	Following station
Southbourne	Southern West Coastway Line	Warblington
Southbourne	Southern West Coastway Line	Havant

== Former services ==
Until May 2022 one Great Western Railway service from Portsmouth Harbour to Brighton called at Emsworth.

== Bus connections ==
The station is served by the Coastliner route 700 bus, operated by Stagecoach South which provides buses every 20 minutes between Bognor Regis, Chichester and Portsmouth.
