= George Carter (Hampshire cricketer) =

English cricketer from the 19th century

Personal information
- Full name: George Edward Carter
- Born: 4 June 1846; Warblington, Hampshire, England
- Died: 5 April 1911 (aged 64); Shepherd's Bush, London, England
- Batting: Right-handed
- Bowling: Right-arm roundarm fast

Domestic team information
- Years: Team
- 1869–1878: Hampshire

Career statistics
Competition	First-class
Matches	12
Runs scored	274
Batting average	11.91
100s/50s	–/–
Top score	34
Balls bowled	68
Wickets	1
Bowling average	12.00
5 wickets in innings	–
10 wickets in match	–
Best bowling	1/44
Catches/stumpings	4/–
- Source: Cricinfo, 31 January 2010

George Carter (4 August 1846 – 5 April 1911) was an English first-class cricketer and soldier.

Carter was born in August 1846 at Warblington, Hampshire. He first played for Hampshire in minor matches in 1864, shortly before his 18th birthday. Five years later he made his first-class debut for Hampshire against the Marylebone Cricket Club at Lord's in 1869, with him playing in the return fixture that season at Southampton. He made two further appearances in 1870, followed by a gap of six years before he next played for Hampshire. Between 1876 and 1878, he made a further eight first-class appearances. In his twelve first-class matches, he scored 274 runs at an average of 11.91, with a highest score of 34.

Outside of cricket, Carter spent nineteen years as a volunteer with the 4th Volunteer Battalion, Hampshire Regiment, where he had success in competitive rifle shooting. He was one of the guards of honour at the Wedding of Prince Albert Edward and Princess Alexandra in 1863. Later in life, he moved to Shepherd's Bush. There he was involved with St. Luke's Church on Uxbridge Road, spending several years as churchwarden and as the sole tenor in the choir. Carter died at his Shepherd's Bush residence on 5 April 1911; his funeral was held five days later at St Luke's, with his body being interred at Acton Vale Cemetery. He was survived by his wife and four children.
