= Emsworth =

Coastal town in Hampshire, England

Coordinates: 50.849°N 0.938°W

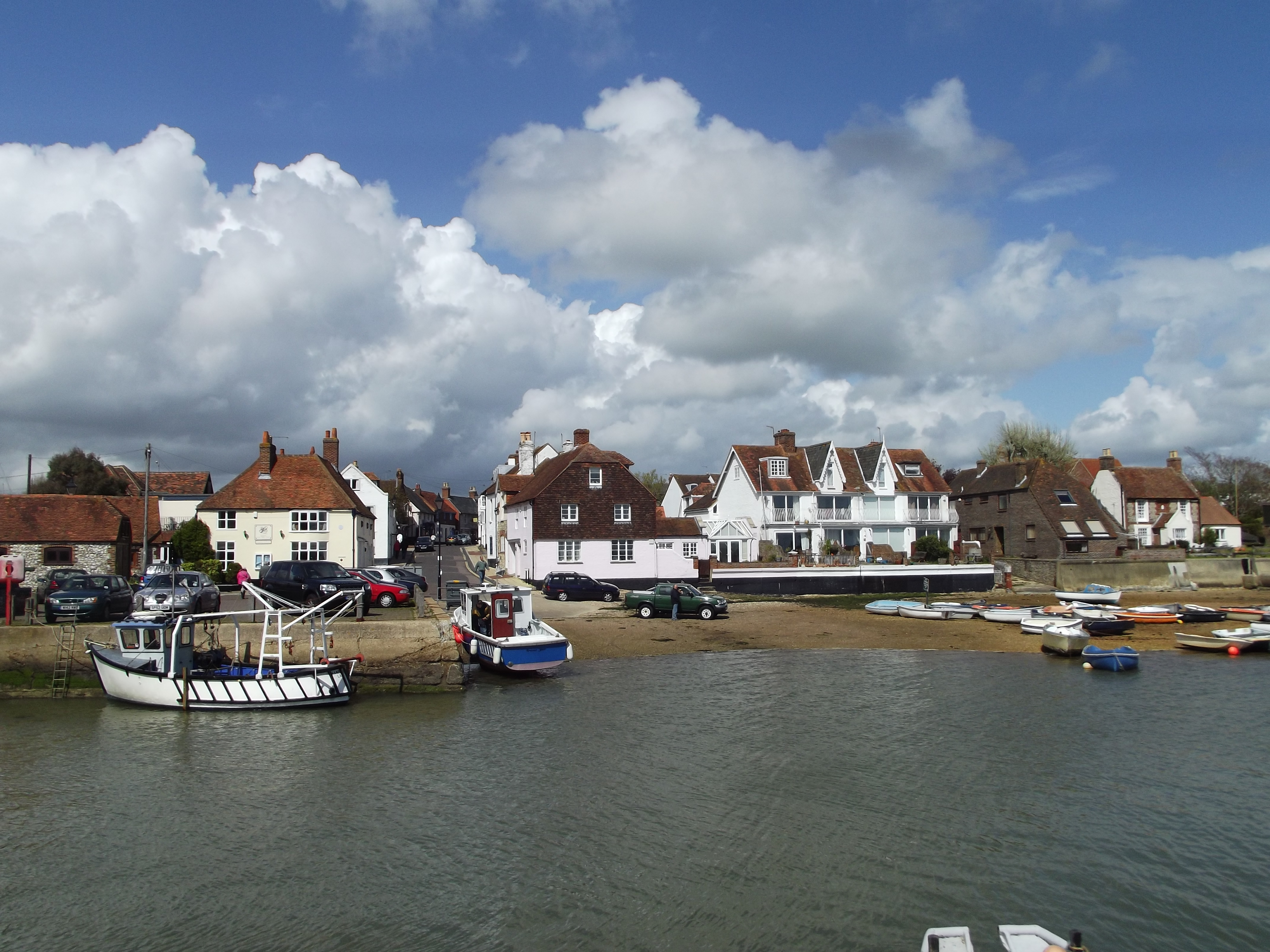

- Location within Hampshire
- Population: 10,269
- OS grid reference: SU748060
- Civil parish: unparished
- District: Havant
- Shire county: Hampshire
- Region: South East
- Country: England
- Sovereign state: United Kingdom
- Post town: EMSWORTH
- Postcode district: PO10
- Dialling code: 01243
- Police: Hampshire and Isle of Wight
- Fire: Hampshire and Isle of Wight
- Ambulance: South Central
- UK Parliament: Havant

Emsworth is a town in the Borough of Havant in the county of Hampshire, on the south coast of England near the border with West Sussex. It lies at the north end of an arm of Chichester Harbour, a large and shallow inlet from the English Channel, and is equidistant between Portsmouth and Chichester.

Emsworth had a population of 10,269 at the 2021 Census. The town has a basin for yachts and fishing boats, which fills at high tide and can be emptied through a sluice at low tide. In geodemographic segmentation the town is the heart of the Emsworth (cross-county) built-up area, the remainder of which is Westbourne, Southbourne and Nutbourne. The area had a combined population of 18,777 in 2011, with a density of 30.5 people per hectare, and shares two railway stations.

== Etymology ==
According to Richard Coates the meaning of Emsworth is derived from the Old English Æmelswrð, which translates as 'Æmmele's curtilage'. Similarly, Eilert Ekwall says that "Emsworth" was derived from Amils worth, with worth meaning the fence around the property (owned by Amil).

It is popularly thought that Emsworth derived its name from the River Ems, but this is not true; before the 16th century the stream was actually called the Bourne. The river was renamed by the 16th century chronicler Raphael Holinshed: (Note: Holinshed originally published "Chronicles of England, Scotland, and Ireland", in 1587. There was a reprint in 1807, that had some excisions in it, ordered by the Privy Council.)

The Emille cometh first between Racton and Stansted, then down to Emilswort or Emmesworth, and so into the Ocean. Separating Sussex from Hampshire almost from the very head.

— Holinshed, Raphael (1807), Holinshed's Chronicles of England, Scotland, and Ireland, vol. 1, London: J.Johnson et al., p. 94

Holinshed writes that the Emille flows in to the sea at Emilswort or Emmesworth. Therefore, it appears that the river was named after Emsworth and not the other way round.

== History ==
=== Pre-Roman ===
In prehistoric and early historical times the River Ems was tidal as far as Westbourne and the Westbrook creek reached to Victoria Road, leaving Emsworth almost isolated at high tide. A coastal route developed that led from Hayling Island through Havant and Rowlands Castle to the Downs. A part of the coastal route followed the Portsdown ridgeway and from Chichester to Belmont Hill in Bedhampton probably skirted the heads of the various creeks which entered the harbour, passing through country still covered with the original thick forest of oak and beech.

=== Roman ===
In Roman times a villa existed to the south of the road to Noviomagus Reginorum in the fields of what is now Warblington Castle Farm. Archaeological finds show that the building was a sizeable brick and stone edifice, with floors paved with red brick and coloured sandstone and a view of the harbour and wooded shores of Hayling Island. The fertile landscape suggests the area to have been under continuous cultivation for 1500–1800 years.

=== Anglo-Saxon ===
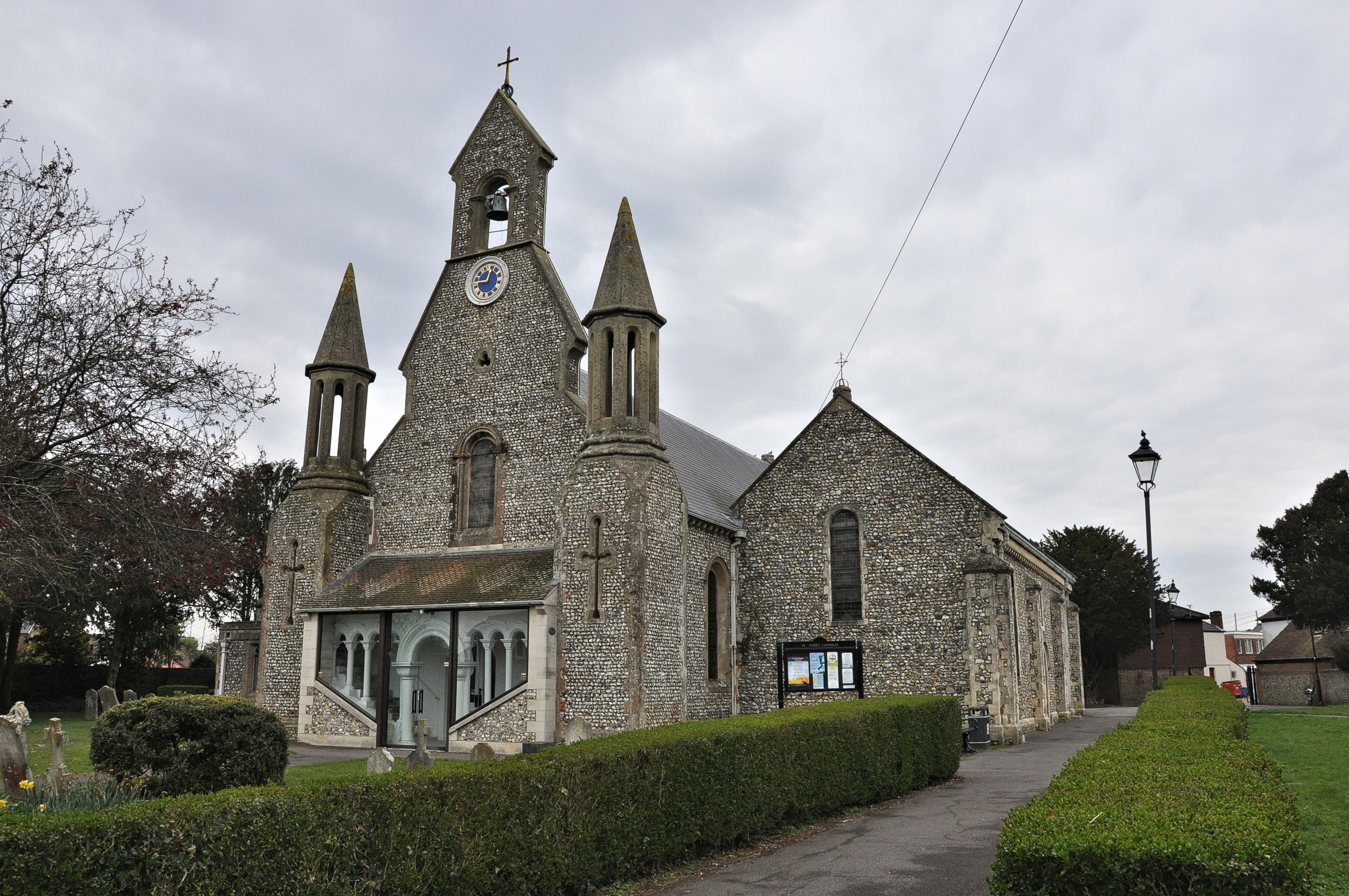
St James' Church

Saxons began settling the area after AD 500. Charters were granted by Kings Æthelstan and Æthelred in AD 935 and AD 980 establishing and confirming the boundaries of Warblington. From AD 980–1066 the manor was held by Godwin, Earl of Wessex and his son Harold Godwinson.

=== Medieval ===
After the Norman Conquest, the Manor of Warblington was given to Roger de Montgomery, Earl of Shrewsbury as part of the manor of Westbourne. The Domesday Book lists the latter with two churches, a mill, 29 families and two slaves (about 120 people). There were also seven plough teams, indicating about 850 acres of land under cultivation.

The first recorded mention of Emsworth as a separate entity was in AD 1216, when King John divided the manor of Warblington, accepting annual rent of 'a pair of gilt spurs yearly' from William Aguillon for land at Emelsworth. In AD 1239, Henry III granted the town a weekly market on Wednesdays and an annual fair on 7 July. The town was mentioned in a patent roll of a hospital in the Hermitage area in AD 1251.

In AD 1341 Emsworth was designated as one of five English towns required to provide a ship for defence of the Channel Islands. It was designated as a customs landing for Chichester in AD 1346 and in AD 1348 was investigated by a special commission for smuggling.

=== 18th and 19th centuries ===
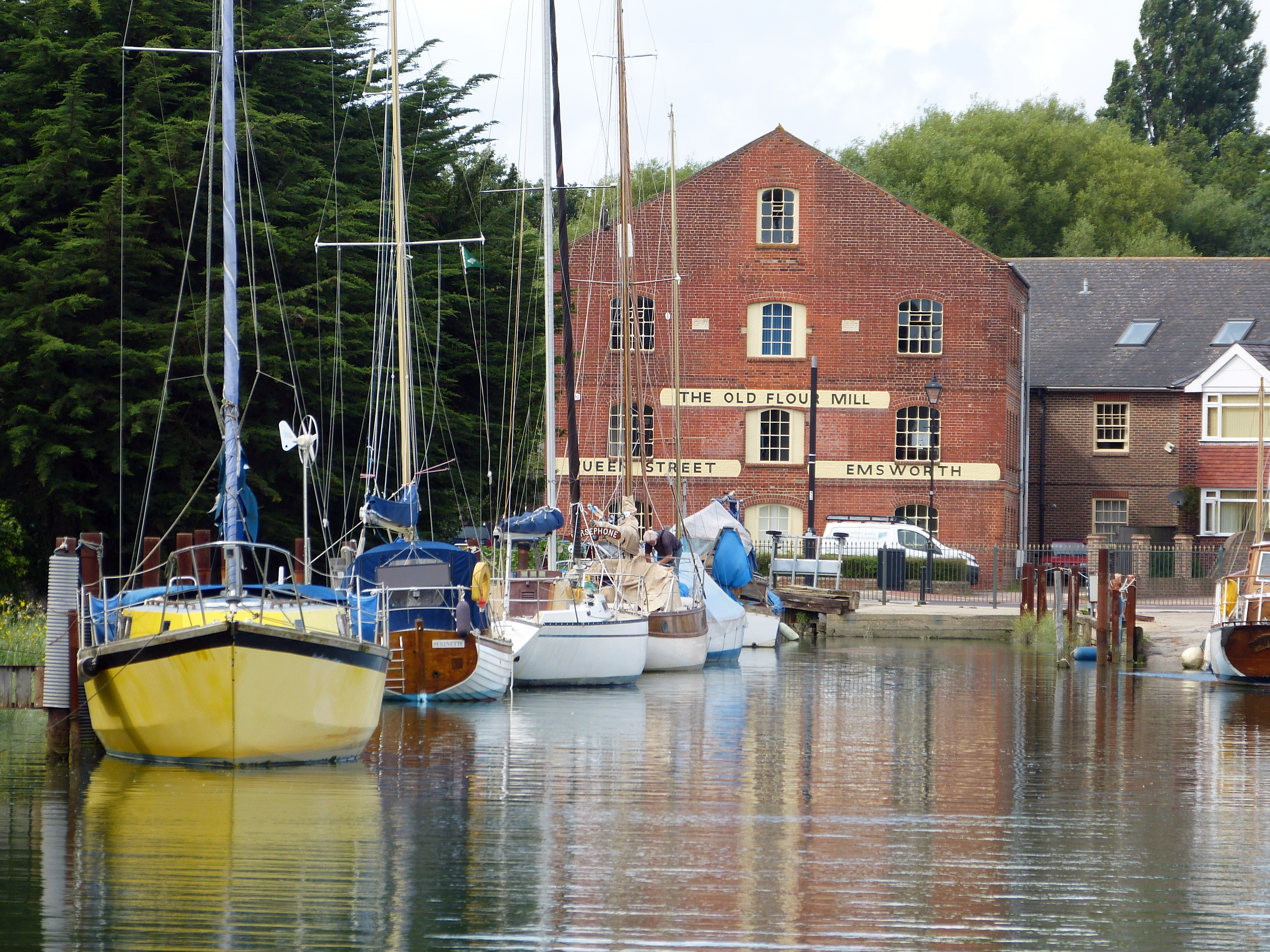
The Old Flour Mill

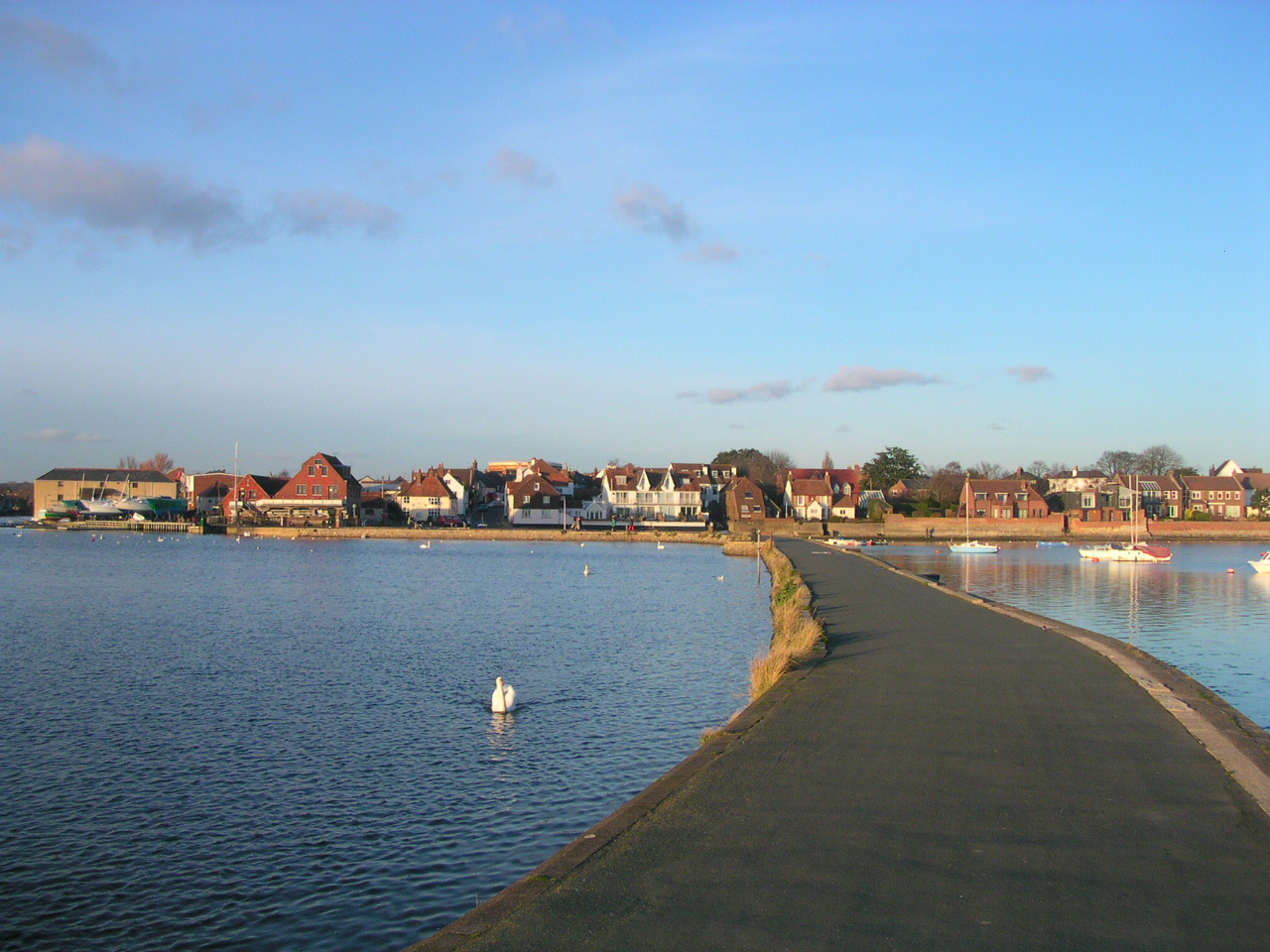
The Promenade

During the 18th and 19th centuries, Emsworth was still a port. Emsworth was known for shipbuilding, boat building and rope making. Grain from the area was ground into flour by tidal mills and transported by ship to places such as London and Portsmouth. Timber from the area was also exported in the 18th and 19th centuries. The River Ems, which is named after the town (not, as often believed, the town being named after the river), flows into the Slipper millpond. The mill itself is now used as offices.

In the 19th century Emsworth had as many as 30 pubs and beer houses; today, only nine remain.

At the beginning of the 19th century, Emsworth had a population of less than 1,200 but it was still considered a large village for the time. By the end of the 18th century, it became fashionable for wealthy people to spend the summer by the sea. In 1805 a bathing house was built where people could have a bath in seawater.

St Peter's Chapel was completed in 1790, later becoming Emsworth Town Hall. The parish Church of St James was built in 1840 to a design by John Elliott. It was expanded in the late 1850s this time to a design by John Colson. Colson's designs were again used in an expansion of 1865. A final round of building took place in the early 1890s this time to a design by Arthur Blomfield. The reredos added in the 1920s features a painting by Percy George Bentham.

Queen Victoria visited Emsworth in 1842, resulting in Queen Street and Victoria Road being named after her. In 1847 the London, Brighton and South Coast Railway (now the West Coastway line) came to Emsworth, with a railway station built to serve the town.

Hollybank House to the north of the town was built in 1825 and is now a hotel.

Emsworth became part of Warblington Urban District which held its first meeting in 1895. The Urban District was abolished in 1932. Emsworth subsequently became part of Havant Urban District.

=== Modern ===
By 1901 the population of Emsworth was about 2,000. It grew rapidly during the 20th century to about 5,000 by the middle of the century. In 1906 construction began on the post office, with local cricketer George Wilder laying an inscribed brick. The renamed Emsworth Recreation Ground dates from 1909 and is the current home of Emsworth Cricket Club, which was founded in 1811. Cricket in Emsworth has been played at the same ground, Cold Harbour Lawn, since 1761.

In 1902 the once famous Emsworth oyster industry went into rapid decline. This was after many of the guests at mayoral banquets in Southampton and Winchester became seriously ill and four died after consuming oysters. The infection was due to oysters sourced from Emsworth, as the oyster beds had been contaminated with raw sewage. Fishing oysters at Emsworth was subsequently halted until new sewers were dug, though the industry never completely recovered. J D Foster, an oyster merchant, who had for many years been in occupation of the oyster beds sued Warblington Urban District Council (the owners of the sewers) for nuisance. This was a test case as he could not prove title to the land. However, the Court of Appeal held that Foster had a right to sue, as exclusive occupier of the oyster beds, whether or not he had acquired an interest in the land itself. The judges view was that:

"..the contest arises, in my view, between the person who is in occupation of a portion of the foreshore and a wrongdoer [Warblington Urban District Council]. Whether the plaintiff would be able to resist the claims of the owner of the foreshore, whoever he may be, or the owner of a several fishery, if such fishery exists, or of a member of the public exercising a right of fishery, if there be such a right in the present case, seems to me immaterial for the purposes of this case . ."(Judge Stirling LJ)

— David Swarbrick (2023). "Foster v Warblington UDC [1906] 1 KB 648". David Swarbrick.

Foster went on to win his case.

Recently, Emsworth's last remaining oyster boat, The Terror, was restored and is now sailing again. But the oyster industry is again under threat, because the reproductive rate of the oysters has plunged, as they now contain microscopic glass spicules that are shed into the water from the hulls of the numerous plastic fibreglass boats in Chichester Harbour.

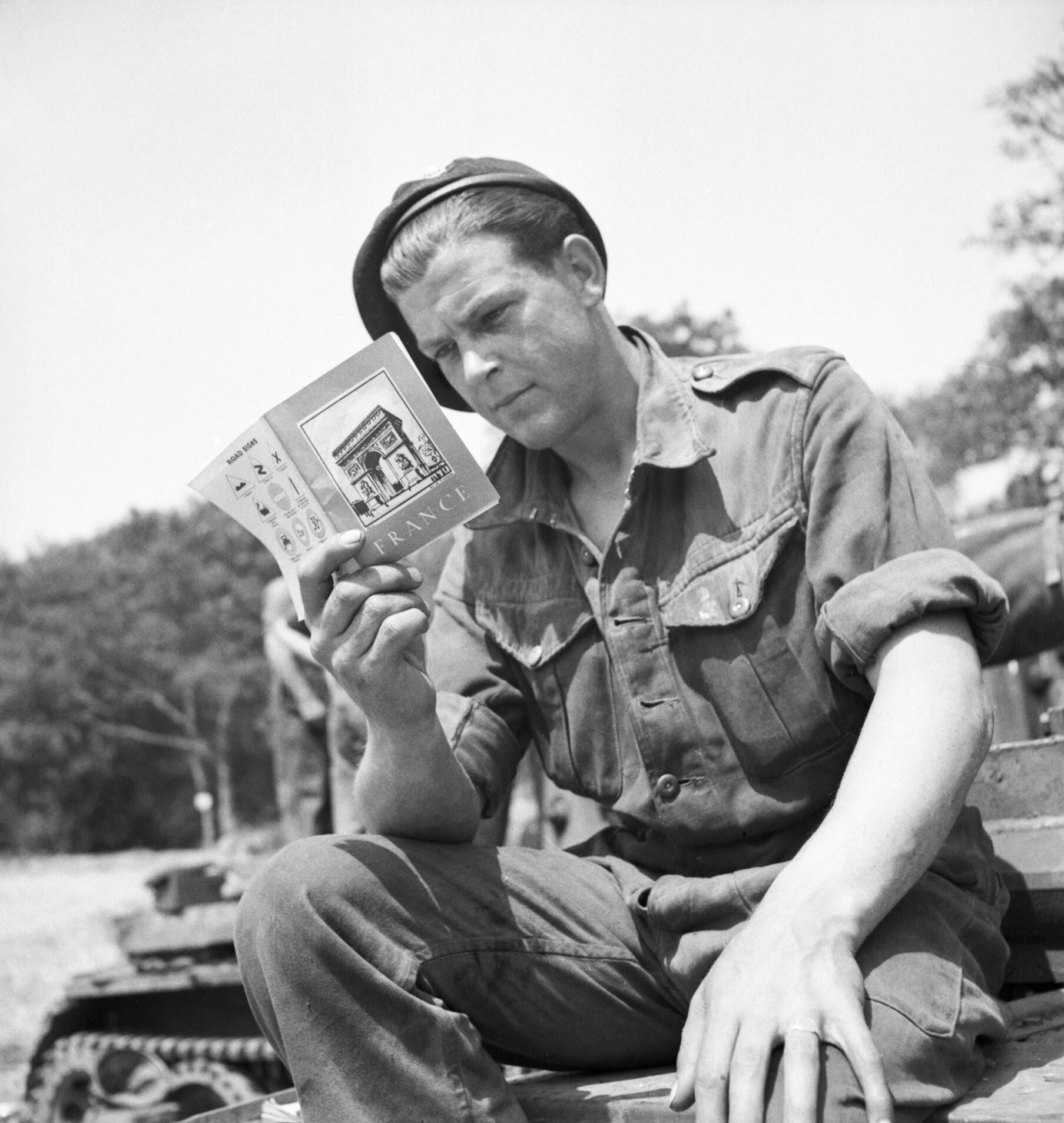
A soldier from 101st Light Anti-Aircraft Regiment prepares for D-Day by reading his French handbook at a camp in Emsworth, 29 May 1944

During the Second World War, nearby Thorney Island was used as a Royal Air Force station, playing a role in defence in the Battle of Britain. The north of Emsworth at this time was used for growing flowers and further north was woodland (today Hollybank Woods). In the run up to D-Day, the Canadian Army used these woods as one of their pre-invasion assembly points for men and materiel. Today the foundations of their barracks can still be seen. In the 1960s large parts of this area were developed with a mix of bungalow and terraced housing.

For a few years (2001 to 2007), Emsworth held a food festival. It was the largest event of its type in the UK, with more than 50,000 visitors in 2007. The festival was cancelled due to numerous complaints of disruption to residents and businesses in the proximity.

A Baptist church was constructed in North Street in 2015.

The harbour is now used for recreational sailing, paddle boarding, kayaking and swimming. The town has two sailing clubs, Emsworth Sailing Club (established in 1919) and Emsworth Slipper Sailing Club (in 1921), the latter based at Quay Mill, a former tide mill. Both clubs organise a programme of racing and social events during the sailing season.

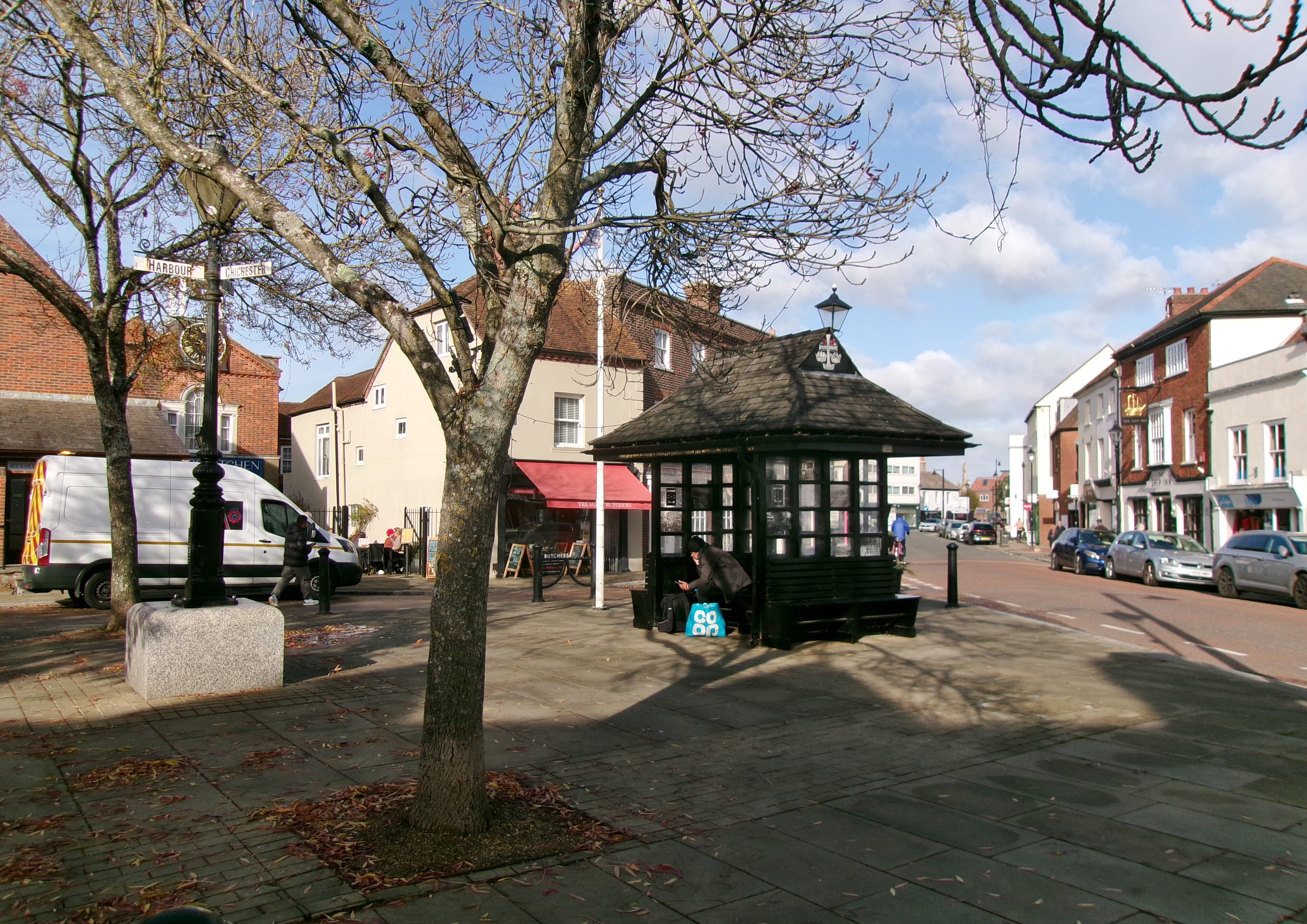
Emsworth town centre

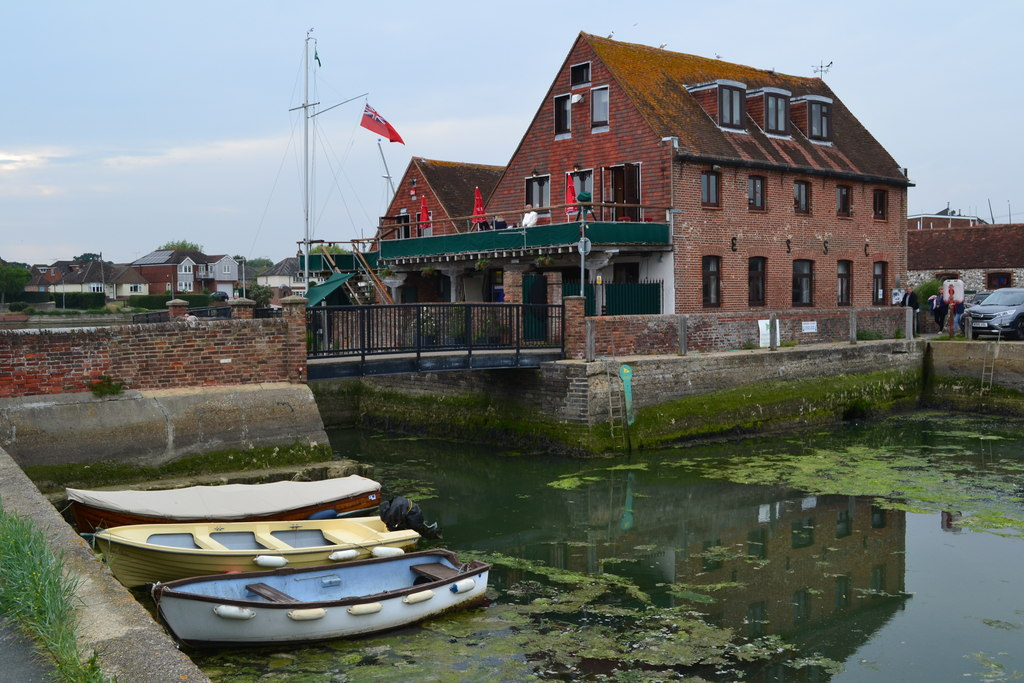
Quay Mill, Emsworth

== Culture and community ==
Emsworth Library was considered for closure in 2020 but following public consultation, was reprieved.

Emsworth Museum is administered by the Emsworth Maritime & Historical Trust.

The town is twinned with Saint-Aubin-sur-Mer in Normandy, France.

Local landmark Thorney Island is home to a detachment of the Sussex Army Cadet Force, a volunteer youth organisation, sponsored by the Ministry of Defence, which accepts cadets aged between 12 and 18 years of age.

1st Emsworth Scouts meet several times per week with different sections aimed at different age groups and abilities.

In 2014 retired Royal Navy Captain Clifford "John" Caughey drove his car into the clubhouse of Emsworth Sailing Club, causing an explosion and requiring thirty firefighters to put out the fire.

== Politics ==
The town is part of the Havant constituency, which since the 1983 election has been a Conservative seat. The current Member of Parliament (MP) is Alan Mak. The town is represented at Havant Borough Council by councillors Richard Kennett and Lulu Bowerman of the Conservative Party and Grainne Rason of the Green Party. The local Hampshire County Councillor is Lulu Bowerman. The town has branches of the Conservative Party, Liberal Democrats, the Labour Party, the United Kingdom Independence Party and the Green Party. The current Member of Parliament (MP) is Alan Mak. The town is represented at Havant Borough Council by councillors Reuben Mychaleckyj, Grainne Rason, and Charles Robert of the Green Party. The local Hampshire County Councillor is Lulu Bowerman.

== Transport ==
Emsworth railway station is on the West Coastway Line. It has services that run to Portsmouth, Southampton, Brighton and London Victoria.

Stagecoach South operates the Coastliner 700 which runs between Chichester and Portsmouth.

As of November 2019 Havant Borough Council claims local bus services are provided by Emsworth & District, First and Stagecoach.

== Notable residents ==
- Denise Black (1958–), actress who is best known for playing Denise Osbourne in Coronation Street and Hazel in Queer as Folk.
- Sir Peter Blake (1948–2001), yachtsman who broke the world record for the fastest solo circumnavigation of the globe in 1994.
- William Buckler (1814–1884), artist and entomologist, lived in Emsworth from the 1860s and died in Lumley in 1884.
- Sub-Lieut. Peter Danckwerts (1916–1984), Royal Navy officer, chemical engineer and academic.
- Albert Finney (1936–2019), actor who was a recipient of BAFTA, Golden Globe and Emmy awards.
- John Hayward, author and social campaigner
- Sir Mark Heath (1927–2005), diplomat who was the former British Ambassador to the Holy See (1980–1985).
- Thomas Hellyer (1811–1894), architect of many buildings in Hampshire and on the Isle of Wight, was born in Emsworth.
- Nicholas Lyndhurst (1961–), actor who is best known for playing Rodney Trotter in Only Fools and Horses.
- General Sir David Richards (1952–), British Army officer and former Chief of the Defence Staff (2010–2013).
- Malcolm Waldron (1956–), footballer who played for Southampton, Burnley and Portsmouth.
- Joel Ward (1989-), footballer who played for Portsmouth FC and Crystal Palace FC was born in Emsworth
- William Whitcher (1832–1910), cricketer who played for Hampshire.
- George Wilder (1876–1948), cricketer who played for Hampshire and Sussex.
- P. G. Wodehouse (1881–1975), writer whose bibliography includes the Jeeves and Wooster and Blandings Castle series

== See also ==
- List of places of worship in the Borough of Havant
