= Listed buildings in Chichester District =

There are around 3,300 listed buildings in Chichester District, East Sussex, which are buildings of architectural or historic interest.

- Grade I buildings are of exceptional interest.
- Grade II* buildings are particularly important buildings of more than special interest.
- Grade II buildings are of special interest.

The lists follow Historic England's geographical organisation, with entries grouped by county, local authority, and parish (civil and non-civil). The following lists are arranged by parish.

| Parish | Listed buildings list | Grade I | Grade II* | Grade II | Total |
|---|---|---|---|---|---|
| Appledram | Listed buildings in Appledram | | | | |
| Barlavington | Listed buildings in Barlavington | | | | |
| Bepton | Listed buildings in Bepton | | | | |
| Bignor | Listed buildings in Bignor | | | | |
| Birdham | Listed buildings in Birdham | | | | |
| Bosham | Listed buildings in Bosham | | | | |
| Boxgrove | Listed buildings in Boxgrove | | | | |
| Bury | Listed buildings in Bury, West Sussex | | | | |
| Chichester | Listed buildings in Chichester (within the city walls); Listed buildings in Chichester (outside the city walls) | 14 | 33 | 472 | 519 |
| Chidham and Hambrook | Listed buildings in Chidham and Hambrook | | | | |
| Cocking | Listed buildings in Cocking, West Sussex | | | | |
| Compton | Listed buildings in Compton, West Sussex | | | | |
| Donnington | Listed buildings in Donnington, West Sussex | | | | |
| Duncton | Listed buildings in Duncton | | | | |
| Earnley | Listed buildings in Earnley | | | | |
| Eartham | Listed buildings in Eartham | | | | |
| Easebourne | Listed buildings in Easebourne | | | | |
| East Dean | Listed buildings in East Dean, West Sussex | | | | |
| East Lavington | Listed buildings in East Lavington | | | | |
| East Wittering and Bracklesham | Listed buildings in East Wittering and Bracklesham | | | | |
| Ebernoe | Listed buildings in Ebernoe | | | | |
| Elsted and Treyford | Listed buildings in Elsted and Treyford | | | | |
| Fernhurst | Listed buildings in Fernhurst | | | | |
| Fishbourne | Listed buildings in Fishbourne, West Sussex | | | | |
| Fittleworth | Listed buildings in Fittleworth | | | | |
| Funtington | Listed buildings in Funtington | | | | |
| Graffham | Listed buildings in Graffham | | | | |
| Harting | Listed buildings in Harting | | | | |
| Heyshott | Listed buildings in Heyshott | | | | |
| Hunston | Listed buildings in Hunston, West Sussex | | | | |
| Kirdford | Listed buildings in Kirdford | | | | |
| Lavant | Listed buildings in Lavant, West Sussex | | | | |
| Linch | Listed buildings in Linch | | | | |
| Linchmere | Listed buildings in Linchmere | | | | |
| Lodsworth | Listed buildings in Lodsworth | | | | |
| Loxwood | Listed buildings in Loxwood | | | | |
| Lurgashall | Listed buildings in Lurgashall | | | | |
| Marden | Listed buildings in Marden, West Sussex | | | | |
| Midhurst | Listed buildings in Midhurst | | | | |
| Milland | Listed buildings in Milland | | | | |
| North Mundham | Listed buildings in North Mundham | | | | |
| Northchapel | Listed buildings in Northchapel | | | | |
| Oving | Listed buildings in Oving, West Sussex | | | | |
| Petworth | Listed buildings in Petworth | | | | |
| Plaistow and Ifold | Listed buildings in Plaistow and Ifold | | | | |
| Rogate | Listed buildings in Rogate | | | | |
| Selsey | Listed buildings in Selsey | | | | |
| Sidlesham | Listed buildings in Sidlesham | | | | |
| Singleton | Listed buildings in Singleton, West Sussex | | | | |
| Southbourne | Listed buildings in Southbourne, West Sussex | | | | |
| Stedham with Iping | Listed buildings in Stedham with Iping | | | | |
| Stopham | Listed buildings in Stopham | | | | |
| Stoughton | Listed buildings in Stoughton, West Sussex | | | | |
| Sutton | Listed buildings in Sutton, West Sussex | | | | |
| Tangmere | Listed buildings in Tangmere | | | | |
| Tillington | Listed buildings in Tillington, West Sussex | | | | |
| Trotton with Chithurst | Listed buildings in Trotton with Chithurst | | | | |
| Upwaltham | Listed buildings in Upwaltham | | | | |
| West Dean | Listed buildings in West Dean, West Sussex | | | | |
| West Itchenor | Listed buildings in West Itchenor | | | | |
| West Lavington | Listed buildings in West Lavington, West Sussex | | | | |
| West Thorney | Listed buildings in West Thorney | | | | |
| West Wittering | Listed buildings in West Wittering, West Sussex | | | | |
| Westbourne | Listed buildings in Westbourne, West Sussex | | | | |
| Westhampnett | Listed buildings in Westhampnett | | | | |
| Wisborough Green | Listed buildings in Wisborough Green | | | | |
| Woolbeding with Redford | Listed buildings in Woolbeding with Redford | | | | |
| Total (Chichester district) | — | 82 | 124 | 3,129 | 3,335 |

== See also ==
- Grade I listed buildings in West Sussex
- Grade II* listed buildings in West Sussex
