= Listed buildings in West Sussex =

There are around 8,800 Listed buildings in West Sussex, which are buildings of architectural or historic interest.

- Grade I buildings are of exceptional interest.
- Grade II* buildings are particularly important buildings of more than special interest.
- Grade II buildings are of special interest.

The lists follow Historic England’s geographical organisation, with entries grouped by county, local authority, and parish (civil and non-civil). Listed buildings in the city of Brighton are predominantly recorded under West Sussex, with a smaller number recorded under East Sussex.

Local authority	Listed buildings list	Grade I	Grade II*	Grade II	Total	Map
Adur District	Listed buildings in Adur	7	7	104	118	
Arun District	Listed buildings in Arun District	24	29	926	979	
Chichester District	Listed buildings in Chichester District	82	124	3,129	3,335	
The City of Brighton and Hove	Grade I listed buildings in Brighton and Hove; Grade II* listed buildings in Brighton and Hove; Grade II listed buildings in Brighton and Hove: A–B; Grade II listed buildings in Brighton and Hove: C–D; Grade II listed buildings in Brighton and Hove: E–H; Grade II listed buildings in Brighton and Hove: I–L; Grade II listed buildings in Brighton and Hove: M Grade II listed buildings in Brighton and Hove: N–O; Grade II listed buildings in Brighton and Hove: P–R; Grade II listed buildings in Brighton and Hove: S Grade II listed buildings in Brighton and Hove: T–V; Grade II listed buildings in Brighton and Hove: W–Z	23	69	1,105	1,197	
Crawley (non-civil parish)	Listed buildings in Crawley	3	12	88	103	
Horsham District	Listed buildings in Horsham District	38	64	1,664	1,766	
Mid Sussex District	Listed buildings in Mid Sussex District	18	60	985	1,063	
Worthing (non-civil parish)	Listed buildings in Worthing	3	11	205	219	
Total (West Sussex)	—	198	376	8,206	8,780	—

== See also ==
- Grade I listed buildings in West Sussex
- Grade II* listed buildings in West Sussex
