= Listed buildings in Chichester (outside the city walls) =

Civil Parish in West Sussex, England

Chichester is a city and civil parish in the Chichester district, West Sussex, England. It contains 14 grade I, 33 grade II* and 472 grade II listed buildings that are recorded in the National Heritage List for England.

This list is based on the information retrieved online from Historic England. The quantity of listed buildings in Chichester requires subdivision into geographically defined lists. This list includes all listed buildings outside the city walls.

== Key ==
Grade	Criteria
I	Buildings that are of exceptional interest
II*	Particularly important buildings of more than special interest
II	Buildings that are of special interest

== Listing ==
Name	Grade	Location	Type	Completed (Note: The date given is the date used by Historic England as significant for the initial building or that of an important part in the structure's description.)	Date designated	Grid ref. (Note: The grid reference is based on the British national grid reference system, sometimes known as OSGB36, used by the Ordnance Survey.) Geo-coordinates	Notes	Entry number (Note: The "List Entry Number" is a unique number assigned to each listed building and scheduled monument by Historic England.)	Image	Wikidata
Chapel at Greylingwell Hospital	II				18 April 2006	SU8665406435; 50°51′03″N 0°46′13″W		1415725	Chapel at Greylingwell Hospital More images	Q26676463
The Old Rectory	II	Appeldram Lane			5 July 1950	SU8439504606; 50°50′05″N 0°48′10″W		1354264	Upload Photo	Q26637133
Railway Arms Public House	II	66 and 68, Basin Road			8 October 1971	SU8598604250; 50°49′53″N 0°46′49″W		1026831	Upload Photo	Q26277788
70, Basin Road	II	70, Basin Road			8 October 1971	SU8598404247; 50°49′53″N 0°46′50″W		1354266	Upload Photo	Q26637135
91, Basin Road	II	91, Basin Road			8 October 1971	SU8596804141; 50°49′50″N 0°46′50″W		1191571	Upload Photo	Q26486289
Chichester Festival Theatre	II*	Broyle Road, Oaklands Park			12 June 1998	SU8618405542; 50°50′35″N 0°46′38″W		1323693	Upload Photo	Q113989321
The Cawley Almhouses or the Hospital of St Bartholmew	II	Broyle Road			5 July 1950	SU8608805477; 50°50′33″N 0°46′43″W		1026833	Upload Photo	Q26277790
The Royal West Sussex Hospital	II*	Broyle Road			8 October 1971	SU8597905681; 50°50′39″N 0°46′49″W		1354267	Upload Photo	Q17531863
1, Broyle Road	II	1, Broyle Road			5 July 1950	SU8606105438; 50°50′31″N 0°46′45″W		1026832	Upload Photo	Q26277789
148-151, Broyle Road	II	148-151, Broyle Road			8 October 1971	SU8592906456; 50°51′05″N 0°46′51″W		1191605	Upload Photo	Q26486320
1 and 2, Cavendish Street	II	1 and 2, Cavendish Street			8 October 1971	SU8583705428; 50°50′31″N 0°46′56″W		1026799	Upload Photo	Q26277758
3 and 4, Cavendish Street	II	3 and 4, Cavendish Street			8 October 1971	SU8583105422; 50°50′31″N 0°46′56″W		1026800	Upload Photo	Q26277759
5-8, Cavendish Street	II	5-8, Cavendish Street			8 October 1971	SU8582005409; 50°50′31″N 0°46′57″W		1354287	Upload Photo	Q26637154
9 and 10, Cavendish Street	II	9 and 10, Cavendish Street			8 October 1971	SU8581505404; 50°50′31″N 0°46′57″W		1026801	Upload Photo	Q26277761
11-13, Cavendish Street	II	11-13, Cavendish Street			8 October 1971	SU8580905397; 50°50′30″N 0°46′58″W		1354288	Upload Photo	Q26637155
14 and 15, Cavendish Street	II	14 and 15, Cavendish Street			8 October 1971	SU8579605384; 50°50′30″N 0°46′58″W		1026802	Upload Photo	Q26277762
16-21, Cavendish Street	II	16-21, Cavendish Street			8 October 1971	SU8578305368; 50°50′29″N 0°46′59″W		1354289	Upload Photo	Q26637156
21a, 22-27, Cavendish Street	II	21a, 22-27, Cavendish Street			8 October 1971	SU8576805363; 50°50′29″N 0°47′00″W		1026803	Upload Photo	Q26277763
28-31, Cavendish Street	II	28-31, Cavendish Street			8 October 1971	SU8576505382; 50°50′30″N 0°47′00″W		1026804	Upload Photo	Q26277764
32-39, Cavendish Street	II	32-39, Cavendish Street			8 October 1971	SU8577705395; 50°50′30″N 0°46′59″W		1354290	Upload Photo	Q26637157
40-43, Cavendish Street	II	40-43, Cavendish Street			8 October 1971	SU8580005421; 50°50′31″N 0°46′58″W		1026805	Upload Photo	Q26277765
44-47, Cavendish Street	II	44-47, Cavendish Street			8 October 1971	SU8580805429; 50°50′31″N 0°46′58″W		1286939	Upload Photo	Q26575482
48 and 49, Cavendish Street	II	48 and 49, Cavendish Street			8 October 1971	SU8581805440; 50°50′32″N 0°46′57″W		1354291	Upload Photo	Q26637158
50, Cavendish Street	II	50, Cavendish Street			8 October 1971	SU8582505448; 50°50′32″N 0°46′57″W		1026806	Upload Photo	Q26277766
Roman Catholic Church Of St Richard	II	Cawley Road			13 November 2007	SU8622004416; 50°49′58″N 0°46′37″W		1392318	Upload Photo	Q23302051
The John Abel Smith Memorial Chapel	II	Church Road			12 July 1982	SU8746705279; 50°50′26″N 0°45′33″W		1026589	Upload Photo	Q26277537
Nelson Court	II	Church Road			17 April 2000	SU8770205147; 50°50′21″N 0°45′21″W		1380233	Upload Photo	Q26660445
Mead House	II	Clay Lane			8 October 1971	SU8421205096; 50°50′21″N 0°48′19″W		1354293	Upload Photo	Q26637160
Applegarth	II	Clay Lane			8 October 1971	SU8423005093; 50°50′21″N 0°48′18″W		1191797	Upload Photo	Q26486502
Bishop Otter Memorial College	II	College Lane			8 October 1971	SU8634305690; 50°50′39″N 0°46′30″W		1354294	Upload Photo	Q26637162
7, College Lane	II	7, College Lane			8 October 1971	SU8639805466; 50°50′32″N 0°46′27″W		1191843	Upload Photo	Q26486545
The Thatched Barn	II	Combes Yard, The Hornet			23 September 1976	SU8659104840; 50°50′12″N 0°46′18″W		1354388	Upload Photo	Q26637246
1-7, Draymans Mews	II	1-7, Draymans Mews, St Pancras			24 April 1989	SU8673504957; 50°50′16″N 0°46′11″W		1354389	Upload Photo	Q26637247
10, Eastgate Square	II	10, Eastgate Square			8 October 1971	SU8648004772; 50°50′10″N 0°46′24″W		1026791	10, Eastgate Square More images	Q26277750
11, Eastgate Square	II*	11, Eastgate Square			3 February 1960	SU8647104763; 50°50′09″N 0°46′24″W		1026792	11, Eastgate Square More images	Q17531086
12, Eastgate Square	II	12, Eastgate Square			8 October 1971	SU8646704760; 50°50′09″N 0°46′24″W		1192220	12, Eastgate Square More images	Q26486899
Former Cattle Market Inn	II	13, Eastgate Square, PO19 1JL			8 October 1971	SU8644304759; 50°50′09″N 0°46′26″W		1354286	Former Cattle Market Inn More images	Q26637153
14, Eastgate Square	II	14, Eastgate Square			8 October 1971	SU8643304765; 50°50′09″N 0°46′26″W		1026793	14, Eastgate Square More images	Q26277752
15, Eastgate Square	II	15, Eastgate Square			8 October 1971	SU8642504767; 50°50′10″N 0°46′27″W		1286685	15, Eastgate Square More images	Q26575258
16, Eastgate Square	II	16, Eastgate Square			8 October 1971	SU8641804768; 50°50′10″N 0°46′27″W		1026794	16, Eastgate Square More images	Q26277753
1-1a, Franklin Place	II	1-1a, Franklin Place			8 October 1971	SU8626205256; 50°50′25″N 0°46′34″W		1354306	Upload Photo	Q26637173
Eastgate Hall	II	Market Road			18 September 2000	SU8647304738; 50°50′09″N 0°46′24″W		1416404	Eastgate Hall More images	Q26676514
Wall to North of No 17	II	Northgate			8 October 1971	SU8608505346; 50°50′28″N 0°46′43″W		1354300	Upload Photo	Q26637168
1, Northgate	II	1, Northgate			5 July 1950	SU8612205237; 50°50′25″N 0°46′42″W		1026737	Upload Photo	Q26277692
4, Northgate	II	4, Northgate			5 July 1950	SU8609405219; 50°50′24″N 0°46′43″W		1354338	Upload Photo	Q26637201
5, Northgate	II	5, Northgate			5 July 1950	SU8608905225; 50°50′25″N 0°46′43″W		1026738	Upload Photo	Q26277694
Northgate Cottage	II	5a, Northgate			8 October 1971	SU8607605229; 50°50′25″N 0°46′44″W		1193068	Upload Photo	Q26487733
6, Northgate	II	6, Northgate			8 October 1971	SU8606705226; 50°50′25″N 0°46′44″W		1026739	Upload Photo	Q26277695
7 and 8, Northgate	II	7 and 8, Northgate			8 October 1971	SU8606005224; 50°50′25″N 0°46′45″W		1354339	Upload Photo	Q26637202
North Lodge	II	15, Northgate			5 July 1950	SU8606505309; 50°50′27″N 0°46′45″W		1193079	Upload Photo	Q26487743
16, Northgate	II	16, Northgate			8 October 1971	SU8608405326; 50°50′28″N 0°46′44″W		1026740	Upload Photo	Q26277697
17, Northgate	II	17, Northgate			8 October 1971	SU8608705338; 50°50′28″N 0°46′43″W		1193091	Upload Photo	Q26487753
Whitehouse Farmhouse	II	Old Broyle Road			8 October 1971	SU8522006032; 50°50′51″N 0°47′27″W		1354335	Upload Photo	Q26637198
Warehouse Adjoining No 208 to the East	II	Orchard Street			8 October 1971	SU8599705208; 50°50′24″N 0°46′48″W		1026690	Upload Photo	Q26277646
9, Orchard Street	II	9, Orchard Street			5 July 1950	SU8568704995; 50°50′17″N 0°47′04″W		1193637	Upload Photo	Q26488284
17 and 19, Orchard Street	II	17 and 19, Orchard Street			5 July 1950	SU8569605023; 50°50′18″N 0°47′04″W		1026683	Upload Photo	Q26277637
56, Orchard Street	II	56, Orchard Street			8 October 1971	SU8573005030; 50°50′18″N 0°47′02″W		1026686	Upload Photo	Q26277641
67, Orchard Street	II	67, Orchard Street			8 October 1971	SU8573405084; 50°50′20″N 0°47′02″W		1026684	Upload Photo	Q26277638
131-161, Orchard Street	II	131-161, Orchard Street			8 October 1971	SU8590705205; 50°50′24″N 0°46′53″W		1026685	Upload Photo	Q26277640
174-186, Orchard Street	II	174-186, Orchard Street, PO19 1DE			8 October 1971	SU8592805186; 50°50′23″N 0°46′52″W		1026687	Upload Photo	Q26277642
190-198, Orchard Street	II	190-198, Orchard Street			8 October 1971	SU8596805194; 50°50′24″N 0°46′50″W		1026688	Upload Photo	Q26277643
200-208, Orchard Street	II	200-208, Orchard Street			8 October 1971	SU8597505195; 50°50′24″N 0°46′49″W		1026689	Upload Photo	Q26277645
66, Oving Road	II	66, Oving Road			8 October 1971	SU8731104914; 50°50′14″N 0°45′41″W		1354354	Upload Photo	Q26637215
193-201, Oving Road	II	193-201, Oving Road			8 October 1971	SU8767004974; 50°50′16″N 0°45′23″W		1285996	Upload Photo	Q26574640
Wall and Gateway Behind No 19 to South West	II	Parchment Street			8 October 1971	SU8571405390; 50°50′30″N 0°47′02″W		1026694	Upload Photo	Q26277650
1-7, Parchment Street	II	1-7, Parchment Street			8 October 1971	SU8577705440; 50°50′32″N 0°46′59″W		1026693	Upload Photo	Q26277649
8-13, Parchment Street	II	8-13, Parchment Street			8 October 1971	SU8572105381; 50°50′30″N 0°47′02″W		1354356	Upload Photo	Q26637217
Clock House	II	19, Parchment Street			8 October 1971	SU8571405399; 50°50′30″N 0°47′02″W		1193790	Upload Photo	Q26488436
Salthill Lodge	II	Salthill Lane			28 February 1989	SU8426905685; 50°50′40″N 0°48′16″W		1253129	Upload Photo	Q26544930
13-15, Southgate	II	13-15, Southgate			8 October 1971	SU8598904462; 50°50′00″N 0°46′49″W		1026682	Upload Photo	Q26277636
16-18, Southgate	II	16-18, Southgate			8 October 1971	SU8599104475; 50°50′00″N 0°46′49″W		1354353	Upload Photo	Q26637214
24, Southgate	II	24, Southgate			5 July 1950	SU8600204508; 50°50′01″N 0°46′48″W		1194560	Upload Photo	Q26489181
25a, Southgate	II	25a, Southgate			8 October 1971	SU8600104512; 50°50′02″N 0°46′48″W		1026639	Upload Photo	Q26277593
25 and 26, Southgate	II	25 and 26, Southgate			8 October 1971	SU8600404518; 50°50′02″N 0°46′48″W		1026640	Upload Photo	Q26277594
The Fountain Inn Including the Buildings Adjoining the Inn to the West	II	29, Southgate			8 October 1971	SU8600304554; 50°50′03″N 0°46′48″W		1354373	Upload Photo	Q26637234
30, Southgate	II	30, Southgate			8 October 1971	SU8603504525; 50°50′02″N 0°46′47″W		1026641	Upload Photo	Q26277595
36, Southgate	II	36, Southgate			8 October 1971	SU8601504454; 50°50′00″N 0°46′48″W		1026642	Upload Photo	Q26277596
37, Southgate	II	37, Southgate			8 October 1971	SU8601304445; 50°49′59″N 0°46′48″W		1026643	Upload Photo	Q26277597
38, Southgate	II	38, Southgate			5 July 1950	SU8601104438; 50°49′59″N 0°46′48″W		1026644	Upload Photo	Q26277598
39, 39a and 40, Southgate	II	39, 39a and 40, Southgate			8 October 1971	SU8601104431; 50°49′59″N 0°46′48″W		1026645	Upload Photo	Q26277599
41, Southgate	II	41, Southgate			5 July 1950	SU8601104420; 50°49′59″N 0°46′48″W		1026646	Upload Photo	Q26277601
42, Southgate	II	42, Southgate			5 July 1950	SU8600904416; 50°49′58″N 0°46′48″W		1026647	Upload Photo	Q26277602
41, Spitalfield Lane	II	41, Spitalfield Lane			8 October 1971	SU8661005415; 50°50′30″N 0°46′17″W		1026624	Upload Photo	Q26277577
St James's Post	II	St Pancras			8 October 1971	SU8708205282; 50°50′26″N 0°45′53″W		1354344	Upload Photo	Q26637206
Church of St Pancras	II	St Pancras			5 July 1950	SU8645604828; 50°50′12″N 0°46′25″W		1354343	Church of St Pancras More images	Q26637205
St Pancras Parish Hall	II	St Pancras			8 October 1971	SU8677105041; 50°50′18″N 0°46′09″W		1194333	Upload Photo	Q26488959
5 and 6, St Pancras	II	5 and 6, St Pancras			8 October 1971	SU8650104853; 50°50′12″N 0°46′23″W		1026663	Upload Photo	Q26277614
7, St Pancras	II	7, St Pancras			8 October 1971	SU8650404858; 50°50′12″N 0°46′22″W		1026664	Upload Photo	Q26277615
8 and 9, St Pancras	II	8 and 9, St Pancras			8 October 1971	SU8650804861; 50°50′13″N 0°46′22″W		1026665	Upload Photo	Q26277616
10 and 11, St Pancras	II	10 and 11, St Pancras			8 October 1971	SU8651304867; 50°50′13″N 0°46′22″W		1026666	Upload Photo	Q26277617
12-14, St Pancras	II	12-14, St Pancras			8 October 1971	SU8651704871; 50°50′13″N 0°46′22″W		1026667	Upload Photo	Q26277619
26 and 29, St Pancras	II	26 and 29, St Pancras			8 October 1971	SU8668205009; 50°50′17″N 0°46′13″W		1026668	Upload Photo	Q26277620
42-45, St Pancras	II	42-45, St Pancras			8 October 1971	SU8673605048; 50°50′18″N 0°46′10″W		1026669	Upload Photo	Q26277621
Lion House	II	79, St Pancras			5 July 1950	SU8695805220; 50°50′24″N 0°45′59″W		1026670	Upload Photo	Q26277622
111 and 112, St Pancras	II	111 and 112, St Pancras			5 July 1950	SU8672305002; 50°50′17″N 0°46′11″W		1026671	Upload Photo	Q26277623
113 and 114, St Pancras	II	113 and 114, St Pancras			8 October 1971	SU8670704986; 50°50′17″N 0°46′12″W		1354345	Upload Photo	Q26637207
115 and 116, St Pancras	II	115 and 116, St Pancras			8 October 1971	SU8669304977; 50°50′16″N 0°46′13″W		1194345	Upload Photo	Q26488972
117, St Pancras	II	117, St Pancras			8 October 1971	SU8669004971; 50°50′16″N 0°46′13″W		1026672	Upload Photo	Q26277624
118, St Pancras	II	118, St Pancras			5 July 1950	SU8668304965; 50°50′16″N 0°46′13″W		1194354	Upload Photo	Q26488981
141 and 142, St Pancras	II	141 and 142, St Pancras			8 October 1971	SU8658904895; 50°50′14″N 0°46′18″W		1026673	Upload Photo	Q26277625
143 and 144, St Pancras	II	143 and 144, St Pancras			8 October 1971	SU8658004888; 50°50′13″N 0°46′19″W		1285715	Upload Photo	Q26574384
147, St Pancras	II	147, St Pancras			8 October 1971	SU8655304870; 50°50′13″N 0°46′20″W		1026674	Upload Photo	Q26277626
148 and 149, St Pancras	II	148 and 149, St Pancras			5 July 1950	SU8654604859; 50°50′12″N 0°46′20″W		1354347	Upload Photo	Q26637208
150, St Pancras	II	150, St Pancras			8 October 1971	SU8653904857; 50°50′12″N 0°46′21″W		1194383	Upload Photo	Q26489009
152-154, St Pancras	II	152-154, St Pancras			5 July 1950	SU8649604825; 50°50′11″N 0°46′23″W		1026675	Upload Photo	Q26277627
155 and 156, St Pancras	II	155 and 156, St Pancras			8 October 1971	SU8649204822; 50°50′11″N 0°46′23″W		1285693	Upload Photo	Q26574364
Litten Gardens	II	St Pancras Road, PO19 8EY			2 November 2015	SU8657304946; 50°50′15″N 0°46′19″W		1429864	Upload Photo	Q26677557
Walls and Gate Piers to West of St Paul's Vicarage	II	St Paul's Road			8 October 1971	SU8590405402; 50°50′30″N 0°46′53″W		1354350	Upload Photo	Q26637211
Gate Piers Flanking Church Yard Entrance on West Side	II	St Paul's Road			8 October 1971	SU8595905334; 50°50′28″N 0°46′50″W		1026676	Upload Photo	Q26277629
Washington House	II	St Paul's Road			8 October 1971	SU8587405400; 50°50′30″N 0°46′54″W		1026679	Upload Photo	Q26277632
St Paul's Vicarage	II	St Paul's Road			8 October 1971	SU8592005414; 50°50′31″N 0°46′52″W		1194469	Upload Photo	Q26489094
Church of St Paul	II	St Paul's Road			8 January 1971	SU8602605369; 50°50′29″N 0°46′46″W		1354348	Upload Photo	Q26637209
St Richard's Catholic Social Centre	II	St Paul's Road			8 October 1971	SU8584905433; 50°50′31″N 0°46′55″W		1354351	Upload Photo	Q26637212
House at North Western End of St Richard's Catholic Social Centre	II	St Paul's Road			8 October 1971	SU8583905434; 50°50′31″N 0°46′56″W		1194496	Upload Photo	Q26489118
Wall Enclosing Church Yard on South West and North Sides	II	St Paul's Road			8 October 1971	SU8596505381; 50°50′30″N 0°46′50″W		1285702	Upload Photo	Q26574372
32 and 34, St Paul's Road	II	32 and 34, St Paul's Road			8 October 1971	SU8595505344; 50°50′28″N 0°46′50″W		1026677	Upload Photo	Q26277630
36, St Paul's Road	II	36, St Paul's Road			8 October 1971	SU8594405359; 50°50′29″N 0°46′51″W		1285674	Upload Photo	Q26574347
38, St Paul's Road	II	38, St Paul's Road			8 October 1971	SU8593805362; 50°50′29″N 0°46′51″W		1354349	Upload Photo	Q26637210
40 and 42, St Paul's Road	II	40 and 42, St Paul's Road			8 October 1971	SU8593505370; 50°50′29″N 0°46′51″W		1026678	Upload Photo	Q26277631
Fernhurst Lodge	II	53, St Paul's Road			8 October 1971	SU8586005413; 50°50′31″N 0°46′55″W		1194486	Upload Photo	Q26489110
59 and 61, St Paul's Road	II	59 and 61, St Paul's Road			8 October 1971	SU8580505470; 50°50′33″N 0°46′58″W		1026680	Upload Photo	Q26277633
105, St Paul's Road	II	105, St Paul's Road			8 October 1971	SU8565405620; 50°50′38″N 0°47′05″W		1026681	Upload Photo	Q26277635
Richmond Arms Public House	II	Stockbridge Road			8 October 1971	SU8586404169; 50°49′51″N 0°46′56″W		1026625	Upload Photo	Q26277578
Stockbridge House	II	Stockbridge Road			8 October 1971	SU8575403945; 50°49′43″N 0°47′02″W		1026626	Upload Photo	Q26277579
Graylingwell Farmhouse	II	Summersdale Road, PO19 6GB			25 March 1986	SU8686306430; 50°51′03″N 0°46′03″W		1026590	Upload Photo	Q26277539
Sewer vent pipe adjacent to Chichester Signal Box	II	Terminus Road			21 July 2014	SU8557804311; 50°49′55″N 0°47′10″W		1420682	Upload Photo	Q26676821
Chichester Signal Box	II	Terminus Road, PO19 8UN			18 September 2013	SU8559204311; 50°49′55″N 0°47′10″W		1413573	Upload Photo	Q26676347
1, The Courtyard	II	1, The Courtyard, Westgate			5 July 1950	SU8568404849; 50°50′13″N 0°47′04″W		1285026	Upload Photo	Q26573751
2 and 3, The Courtyard	II	2 and 3, The Courtyard			5 July 1950	SU8566704844; 50°50′12″N 0°47′05″W		1354368	Upload Photo	Q26637229
Eastgate House	II	The Hornet			5 July 1950	SU8675104770; 50°50′09″N 0°46′10″W		1026764	Upload Photo	Q26277722
Garden Wall to Eastgate House on North Side	II	The Hornet			8 October 1971	SU8674904794; 50°50′10″N 0°46′10″W		1192691	Upload Photo	Q26487363
4 (the Eastgate Ph) and 6, The Hornet	II	4 (the Eastgate Ph) And 6, The Hornet, PO19 7JG			8 October 1971	SU8649604776; 50°50′10″N 0°46′23″W		1026762	Upload Photo	Q26277720
8 and 10, The Hornet	II	8 and 10, The Hornet			8 October 1971	SU8650504774; 50°50′10″N 0°46′22″W		1192607	Upload Photo	Q26487282
12 and 14, The Hornet	II	12 and 14, The Hornet			8 October 1971	SU8651204778; 50°50′10″N 0°46′22″W		1354310	Upload Photo	Q26637177
13, The Hornet	II	13, The Hornet			8 October 1971	SU8650804801; 50°50′11″N 0°46′22″W		1354309	Upload Photo	Q26637176
30, The Hornet	II	30, The Hornet			8 October 1971	SU8657104793; 50°50′10″N 0°46′19″W		1026763	Upload Photo	Q26277721
46 and 48, The Hornet	II	46 and 48, The Hornet			8 October 1971	SU8661604795; 50°50′10″N 0°46′17″W		1192680	Upload Photo	Q26487353
50-64, The Hornet	II	50-64, The Hornet, PO19 7JJ			1 February 1989	SU8663204803; 50°50′11″N 0°46′16″W		1261945	Upload Photo	Q26552853
98, The Hornet	II	98, The Hornet			5 July 1950	SU8680404784; 50°50′10″N 0°46′07″W		1354311	Upload Photo	Q26637178
Chichester Theological College	II	Tollhouse Close			31 January 1996	SU8560604812; 50°50′11″N 0°47′08″W		1271544	Upload Photo	Q26561486
1-9, Washington Street	II	1-9, Washington Street			1 February 1971	SU8586805389; 50°50′30″N 0°46′55″W		1181286	Upload Photo	Q26476613
10-16, Washington Street	II	10-16, Washington Street			8 October 1971	SU8584505360; 50°50′29″N 0°46′56″W		1026630	Upload Photo	Q26277583
17 and 18, Washington Street	II	17 and 18, Washington Street			8 October 1971	SU8582905343; 50°50′29″N 0°46′57″W		1181321	Upload Photo	Q26476647
22, Washington Street	II	22, Washington Street			8 October 1971	SU8581205355; 50°50′29″N 0°46′57″W		1354366	Upload Photo	Q26637227
23-32, Washington Street	II	23-32, Washington Street			8 October 1971	SU8582105364; 50°50′29″N 0°46′57″W		1026631	Upload Photo	Q26277584
33-36, Washington Street	II	33-36, Washington Street			8 October 1971	SU8584605395; 50°50′30″N 0°46′56″W		1181331	Upload Photo	Q26476657
37-40, Washington Street	II	37-40, Washington Street			8 October 1971	SU8585405404; 50°50′30″N 0°46′55″W		1354367	Upload Photo	Q26637228
The Beacon	II	27, Wellington Road			8 October 1971	SU8615806110; 50°50′53″N 0°46′39″W		1026632	Upload Photo	Q26277585
29 and 31, Wellington Road	II	29 and 31, Wellington Road			8 October 1971	SU8616706109; 50°50′53″N 0°46′39″W		1181350	Upload Photo	Q26476676
Walls Enclosing Churchyard to St Bartholomew's Church	II	Westgate			8 October 1971	SU8554804825; 50°50′12″N 0°47′11″W		1354371	Upload Photo	Q26637232
K6 Telephone Kiosk	II	Westgate			19 July 1995	SU8542204834; 50°50′12″N 0°47′18″W		1253135	Upload Photo	Q26544935
Garden Wall to No 39 on West Side	II	Westgate			8 October 1971	SU8548504812; 50°50′12″N 0°47′15″W		1354392	Upload Photo	Q26637250
Wall Enclosing Garden Behind Nos 23 and 25 on South East Side	II	Westgate			8 October 1971	SU8557204816; 50°50′12″N 0°47′10″W		1026637	Upload Photo	Q26277591
Church of St Bartholomew	II	Westgate			5 July 1950	SU8557004805; 50°50′11″N 0°47′10″W		1181431	Upload Photo	Q26476750
Wall Enclosing Garden Behind No 21 to South East Side	II	Westgate			8 October 1971	SU8558504819; 50°50′12″N 0°47′09″W		1181421	Upload Photo	Q26476741
Wall Connecting Stables with Marriot House	II	Westgate			8 October 1971	SU8567704856; 50°50′13″N 0°47′05″W		1026633	Upload Photo	Q26277586
7 and 9, Westgate	II	7 and 9, Westgate			5 July 1950	SU8564204850; 50°50′13″N 0°47′07″W		1026634	Upload Photo	Q26277587
11, Westgate	II	11, Westgate			8 October 1971	SU8562004847; 50°50′13″N 0°47′08″W		1181384	Upload Photo	Q26476706
15, Westgate	II	15, Westgate			5 July 1950	SU8560804850; 50°50′13″N 0°47′08″W		1354369	Upload Photo	Q26637230
16, Westgate	II	16, Westgate			5 July 1950	SU8564204875; 50°50′13″N 0°47′07″W		1354393	Upload Photo	Q26637251
17, Westgate	II	17, Westgate			8 October 1971	SU8559904849; 50°50′13″N 0°47′09″W		1026635	Upload Photo	Q26277588
Richmond House	II	18, Westgate			8 October 1971	SU8563304870; 50°50′13″N 0°47′07″W		1026596	Upload Photo	Q26277546
19, Westgate	II	19, Westgate			5 July 1950	SU8559104846; 50°50′13″N 0°47′09″W		1285008	Upload Photo	Q26573735
20 and 20a, Westgate	II	20 and 20a, Westgate			5 July 1950	SU8562404869; 50°50′13″N 0°47′07″W		1026597	Upload Photo	Q26277547
Montreal	II	21, Westgate			5 July 1950	SU8557704847; 50°50′13″N 0°47′10″W		1354370	Upload Photo	Q26637231
22, Westgate	II	22, Westgate			8 October 1971	SU8561604869; 50°50′13″N 0°47′08″W		1026598	Upload Photo	Q26277548
23 and 25, Westgate	II	23 and 25, Westgate			8 October 1971	SU8556804844; 50°50′13″N 0°47′10″W		1026636	Upload Photo	Q26277589
24 and 26, Westgate	II	24 and 26, Westgate			8 October 1971	SU8560904869; 50°50′13″N 0°47′08″W		1026599	Upload Photo	Q26277550
27, Westgate	II	27, Westgate			5 July 1950	SU8553404826; 50°50′12″N 0°47′12″W		1026638	Upload Photo	Q26277592
28, Westgate	II	28, Westgate			8 October 1971	SU8560204874; 50°50′13″N 0°47′09″W		1026600	Upload Photo	Q26277552
Prior House	II	29, Westgate			8 October 1971	SU8552104827; 50°50′12″N 0°47′13″W		1181448	Upload Photo	Q26476767
30 and 32, Westgate	II	30 and 32, Westgate			5 July 1950	SU8559504869; 50°50′13″N 0°47′09″W		1026601	Upload Photo	Q26277553
31-35, Westgate	II	31-35, Westgate			8 October 1971	SU8550704826; 50°50′12″N 0°47′13″W		1354372	Upload Photo	Q26637233
34, Westgate	II	34, Westgate			5 July 1950	SU8558304872; 50°50′13″N 0°47′10″W		1026602	Upload Photo	Q26277554
36 and 38, Westgate	II	36 and 38, Westgate			8 October 1971	SU8557604866; 50°50′13″N 0°47′10″W		1026603	Upload Photo	Q26277555
37 and 39, Westgate	II	37 and 39, Westgate			5 July 1950	SU8550004824; 50°50′12″N 0°47′14″W		1026594	Upload Photo	Q26277544
Gate Piers at Western End of No 39	II	39, Westgate			8 October 1971	SU8548104823; 50°50′12″N 0°47′15″W		1026595	Upload Photo	Q26277545
40, Westgate	II	40, Westgate			8 October 1971	SU8556904868; 50°50′13″N 0°47′10″W		1026604	Upload Photo	Q26277556
42, Westgate	II	42, Westgate			8 October 1971	SU8556404867; 50°50′13″N 0°47′10″W		1181543	Upload Photo	Q26476857
St Anthony	II	44, Westgate			5 July 1950	SU8555804864; 50°50′13″N 0°47′11″W		1354394	Upload Photo	Q26637252
46 and 48, Westgate	II	46 and 48, Westgate			8 October 1971	SU8554204859; 50°50′13″N 0°47′12″W		1026605	Upload Photo	Q26277557
Westgate House	II	52, Westgate			5 July 1950	SU8547504864; 50°50′13″N 0°47′15″W		1181551	Upload Photo	Q26476865
Westfield House	II	80, Westgate			5 July 1950	SU8499004771; 50°50′10″N 0°47′40″W		1026606	Upload Photo	Q26277558
Leper's Cottage	II	1, Westhampnett Road			5 July 1950	SU8710905354; 50°50′28″N 0°45′51″W		1026583	Upload Photo	Q26277531
21 and 22, Westhampnett Road	II	21 and 22, Westhampnett Road			8 October 1971	SU8731305440; 50°50′31″N 0°45′41″W		1284383	Upload Photo	Q26573159
Barnwyke House, Dutchmans Cottage And Trimmers House	II	Whyke Road, PO19 8JG			5 July 1950	SU8693804074; 50°49′47″N 0°46′01″W		1026585	Upload Photo	Q26277533
Outbuilding to West of Barnwhyke Flats	II	Whyke Road			8 October 1971	SU8692304086; 50°49′47″N 0°46′02″W		1354386	Upload Photo	Q26637244
Cottage to South of Church of St Mary	II	Whyke Road			8 October 1971	SU8696404090; 50°49′47″N 0°46′00″W		1026584	Upload Photo	Q26277532
Wall to Gates House	II	Whyke Road			8 October 1971	SU8697904204; 50°49′51″N 0°45′59″W		1026587	Upload Photo	Q26277535
Wall to Whyke Grange on East Side	II	Whyke Road			8 October 1971	SU8698204224; 50°49′52″N 0°45′59″W		1354387	Upload Photo	Q26637245
Church of St Mary	II*	Whyke Road			5 July 1950	SU8697604108; 50°49′48″N 0°45′59″W		1354384	Upload Photo	Q17531985
18 and 19, Whyke Road	II	18 and 19, Whyke Road			8 October 1971	SU8704304554; 50°50′02″N 0°45′55″W		1182793	Upload Photo	Q26478022
20-23, Whyke Road	II	20-23, Whyke Road			8 October 1971	SU8704404532; 50°50′02″N 0°45′55″W		1354385	Upload Photo	Q26637243
27, Whyke Road	II	27, Whyke Road			8 October 1971	SU8704604494; 50°50′00″N 0°45′55″W		1284356	Upload Photo	Q26573134
The Crown Inn	II	140, Whyke Road			8 October 1971	SU8695804163; 50°49′50″N 0°46′00″W		1284363	Upload Photo	Q26573141
Gates House	II	145, Whyke Road			5 July 1950	SU8697304199; 50°49′51″N 0°45′59″W		1026586	Upload Photo	Q26277534
Whyke Grange	II	146, Whyke Road			8 October 1971	SU8697504241; 50°49′52″N 0°45′59″W		1182836	Upload Photo	Q26478061

== See also ==
- Grade I listed buildings in West Sussex
- Grade II* listed buildings in West Sussex
