= Listed buildings in Midhurst =

Historic structures in West Sussex, England

Midhurst is a town and civil parish in the Chichester district, West Sussex, England. It contains two grade II* and 105 grade II listed buildings that are recorded in the National Heritage List for England.

This list is based on the information retrieved online from Historic England.

== Key ==
Grade	Criteria
I	Buildings that are of exceptional interest
II*	Particularly important buildings of more than special interest
II	Buildings that are of special interest

== Listing ==
Name	Grade	Location	Type	Completed (Note: The date given is the date used by Historic England as significant for the initial building or that of an important part in the structure's description.)	Date designated	Grid ref. (Note: The grid reference is based on the British national grid reference system, sometimes known as OSGB36, used by the Ordnance Survey.) Geo-coordinates	Notes	Entry number (Note: The "List Entry Number" is a unique number assigned to each listed building and scheduled monument by Historic England.)	Image	Wikidata
The Almshouses	II	Bepton Road			26 November 1987	SU8851821374; 50°59′06″N 0°44′25″W		1276068	Upload Photo	Q26683224
Heathfield Cottage	II	Bepton Road			26 March 1985	SU8806221170; 50°59′00″N 0°44′49″W		1234547	Upload Photo	Q26527943
Bepton Court	II	Bepton Road			15 December 2011	SU8854721418; 50°59′07″N 0°44′24″W		1405462	Upload Photo	Q26675731
The Pound	II	Bepton Road, GU29 9HF			14 September 2011	SU8827321225; 50°59′01″N 0°44′38″W		1403780	Upload Photo	Q26675661
Church of the Divine Motherhood & St Francis of Assisi	II	Bepton Road, GU29 9HD			14 October 2011	SU8839021228; 50°59′01″N 0°44′32″W		1403875	Church of the Divine Motherhood & St Francis of Assisi More images	Q26675663
Midhurst War Memorial	II	Market Square, Between Red Lion Street And Church Hill, GU29 9PB			6 October 2016	SU8868921481; 50°59′09″N 0°44′16″W		1438716	Midhurst War Memorial More images	Q66478020
Taylors	II	Chichester Road			26 November 1987	SU8862421095; 50°58′57″N 0°44′20″W		1276069	Upload Photo	Q26565610
The Former Forge Building	II	Church Hill			26 November 1987	SU8866121543; 50°59′11″N 0°44′18″W		1234600	Upload Photo	Q26527990
Church Hill Dental Practice	II	Church Hill			26 November 1987	SU8866321528; 50°59′11″N 0°44′18″W		1234601	Upload Photo	Q26527991
Forge Cottage	II	Church Hill			26 November 1987	SU8864521545; 50°59′11″N 0°44′18″W		1276056	Upload Photo	Q26565597
Apsley House	II	Church Hill			26 November 1987	SU8867421534; 50°59′11″N 0°44′17″W		1276057	Upload Photo	Q26565598
The Lady Hoare Trust Premises (now Empty) with the House Attached and Mews Cottage	II	Church Hill			26 November 1987	SU8867421546; 50°59′11″N 0°44′17″W		1234598	Upload Photo	Q26527989
Trinity Cottage	II	Church Hill			26 November 1987	SU8866321521; 50°59′11″N 0°44′18″W		1234602	Upload Photo	Q26527992
Church Hill House	II	Church Hill			18 June 1959	SU8870421511; 50°59′10″N 0°44′15″W		1234548	Upload Photo	Q26527944
Campbell Walchli Antiques Old Manor Cottage Old Manor House Restaurant	II	Church Hill			18 June 1959	SU8867321508; 50°59′10″N 0°44′17″W		1234603	Upload Photo	Q26527993
Birdcage House And Lyndale House	II	Church Hill			18 June 1959	SU8866821487; 50°59′09″N 0°44′17″W		1234604	Upload Photo	Q26527994
Church Cottage	II	Church Hill			18 June 1959	SU8870821494; 50°59′10″N 0°44′15″W		1234594	Upload Photo	Q26527986
Magdalene Cottage	II	4, Church Hill			18 June 1959	SU8869721522; 50°59′11″N 0°44′16″W		1276054	Upload Photo	Q26565595
4, 6 and 7, Duck Lane	II	4, 6 and 7, Duck Lane			26 November 1987	SU8863621514; 50°59′10″N 0°44′19″W		1234605	Upload Photo	Q26527995
Bridge over the River Rother	II	Easebourne Lane, Easebourne			18 June 1959	SU8889922036; 50°59′27″N 0°44′05″W		1354687	Upload Photo	Q26637533
Gate House	II	Edinburgh Square			18 June 1959	SU8874921402; 50°59′07″N 0°44′13″W		1234626	Upload Photo	Q26528012
The Old Savings Bank	II	Edinburgh Square			26 November 1987	SU8873321429; 50°59′08″N 0°44′14″W		1234629	Upload Photo	Q26528015
Coppet Hold	II	Edinburgh Square			26 November 1987	SU8872621420; 50°59′07″N 0°44′14″W		1234628	Upload Photo	Q26528014
The Crown Inn	II	Edinburgh Square			26 November 1987	SU8875021425; 50°59′07″N 0°44′13″W		1234625	The Crown Inn	Q26528011
Bierton House	II	Edinburgh Square			18 June 1959	SU8873121398; 50°59′07″N 0°44′14″W		1234627	Upload Photo	Q26528013
Former Richard Green (Ripley) Ltd, Ironmonger	II	Ironmonger, West Street			26 November 1987	SU8862721441; 50°59′08″N 0°44′19″W		1216741	Upload Photo	Q26511502
142, June Lane	II	142, June Lane			26 November 1987	SU8815721928; 50°59′24″N 0°44′43″W		1234630	Upload Photo	Q26528016
Knockhundred House	II	Knockhundred Row			18 June 1959	SU8865321596; 50°59′13″N 0°44′18″W		1276010	Upload Photo	Q26565554
St Oswald's	II	Knockhundred Row			18 June 1959	SU8864521580; 50°59′13″N 0°44′18″W		1276031	St Oswald's	Q26565574
Burgage House and Knockhundred Gallery	II	Knockhundred Row			26 November 1987	SU8869021589; 50°59′13″N 0°44′16″W		1234670	Upload Photo	Q26528057
Curfew Garden Court	II	Knockhundred Row			26 November 1987	SU8870121596; 50°59′13″N 0°44′16″W		1234671	Upload Photo	Q26528058
Public Library	II	Knockhundred Row			18 June 1959	SU8869721566; 50°59′12″N 0°44′16″W		1234672	Public Library More images	Q26528059
2 and 2a, Knockhundred Row	II	2 and 2a, Knockhundred Row			18 June 1959	SU8863421581; 50°59′13″N 0°44′19″W		1234633	Upload Photo	Q26528019
3 and 4, Knockhundred Row	II	3 and 4, Knockhundred Row, GU29 9DQ			18 June 1959	SU8867921558; 50°59′12″N 0°44′17″W		1276030	Upload Photo	Q26565573
5, Knockhundred Row	II	5, Knockhundred Row			26 November 1987	SU8867721572; 50°59′12″N 0°44′17″W		1234631	Upload Photo	Q26528017
7-8, Knockhundred Row	II	7-8, Knockhundred Row			18 June 1959	SU8866521576; 50°59′12″N 0°44′17″W		1234632	Upload Photo	Q26528018
Bloody Mary Bar (Part), No. 9, Pandora, The Coffee Pot And Knockhundred Market	II	9, Knockhundred Row			26 November 1987	SU8866921593; 50°59′13″N 0°44′17″W		1234669	Upload Photo	Q26528056
Lassiters Cottage	II	Lamberts Lane, GU29 9EA			18 October 2011	SU8856721792; 50°59′19″N 0°44′22″W		1403819	Upload Photo	Q26675662
Granville House Johnson And Clarence Solicitors The Fernery	II	Market Square			18 June 1959	SU8875321465; 50°59′09″N 0°44′13″W		1234675	Upload Photo	Q26528062
Eagle House Antiques Market with the Parish Room over It	II	Market Square, Island Site			26 November 1987	SU8872721444; 50°59′08″N 0°44′14″W		1234718	Eagle House Antiques Market with the Parish Room over It More images	Q26528104
The Parish Church of St Mary	II*	Market Square			18 June 1959	SU8871321483; 50°59′09″N 0°44′15″W		1234717	The Parish Church of St Mary More images	Q17531544
Giraffe Records Jackson, Stops And Staff Jackson, Stops And Staff And 'second Thoughts' Clothing Shop With Giraffe Records Second Thoughts Clothing Shop	II	Market Square			18 June 1959	SU8871321429; 50°59′08″N 0°44′15″W		1276012	Upload Photo	Q26565556
2, Market Square	II	2, Market Square			18 June 1959	SU8872621431; 50°59′08″N 0°44′14″W		1234673	Upload Photo	Q26528060
The Angel Hotel	II	North Street			18 June 1959	SU8865321686; 50°59′16″N 0°44′18″W		1234721	The Angel Hotel More images	Q26528107
Dewhurst Butchers H C Farne Food Hall	II	North Street			26 November 1987	SU8861021608; 50°59′13″N 0°44′20″W		1275847	Upload Photo	Q26565403
The Tuck Shop	II	North Street			23 July 1992	SU8865821703; 50°59′16″N 0°44′18″W		1274914	Upload Photo	Q26564538
Cullens	II	North Street			26 November 1987	SU8863721603; 50°59′13″N 0°44′19″W		1275997	Upload Photo	Q26565541
The Harrow	II	North Street			26 November 1987	SU8867021734; 50°59′17″N 0°44′17″W		1275999	Upload Photo	Q26565543
Barclays Bank And Boots Chemist	II	North Street			26 November 1987	SU8864721648; 50°59′15″N 0°44′18″W		1275998	Upload Photo	Q26565542
Chichester District Council Offices	II	North Street			18 June 1959	SU8862921696; 50°59′16″N 0°44′19″W		1234984	Chichester District Council Offices	Q26528353
The Former Stables of the Grammar School to the South of the Original Building	II	North Street			26 November 1987	SU8864521775; 50°59′19″N 0°44′18″W		1234989	Upload Photo	Q26528358
K6 Telephone Kiosk Outside the Grammar School	II	North Street			7 June 1989	SU8865221777; 50°59′19″N 0°44′18″W		1221810	Upload Photo	Q26516181
Former Grammar School, The Old Building (Capron House)	II	North Street, GU29 9DH			18 June 1959	SU8865421805; 50°59′20″N 0°44′18″W		1234988	Upload Photo	Q26528357
Christine, Rothermere And The Crusty Loaf	II	North Street			26 November 1987	SU8867721766; 50°59′19″N 0°44′17″W		1234722	Upload Photo	Q26528108
The Almshouses	II	North Street			26 November 1987	SU8876021976; 50°59′25″N 0°44′12″W		1234992	Upload Photo	Q26528361
Tudor View	II	North Street			18 June 1959	SU8865021667; 50°59′15″N 0°44′18″W		1234720	Upload Photo	Q26528106
Borough House	II	1-5 Borough House, North Street			26 November 1987	SU8873521957; 50°59′25″N 0°44′13″W		1234991	Upload Photo	Q26528360
1, North Street	II	1, North Street			26 November 1987	SU8863421728; 50°59′17″N 0°44′19″W		1234985	Upload Photo	Q26528354
The Midhurst Club	II	47a and 47b, North Street			26 November 1987	SU8863621755; 50°59′18″N 0°44′19″W		1234986	Upload Photo	Q26528355
65a and 65, North Street	II	65a and 65, North Street			26 November 1987	SU8864221766; 50°59′19″N 0°44′18″W		1234987	Upload Photo	Q26528356
Mughal Tandoori	II	134 and 135, North Street			18 June 1959	SU8869021890; 50°59′23″N 0°44′16″W		1275849	Mughal Tandoori	Q26565405
Iron Gates Cottage	II	137, North Street			26 November 1987	SU8867621784; 50°59′19″N 0°44′17″W		1234983	Upload Photo	Q26528352
Former St Margaret's Convent School	II	Petersfield Road			17 September 2010	SU8849421494; 50°59′10″N 0°44′26″W		1393969	Upload Photo	Q26673100
The Half Moon Inn	II	Petersfield Road			26 November 1987	SU8775221821; 50°59′21″N 0°45′04″W		1235039	The Half Moon Inn More images	Q26528401
11, 13, 15 and 17, Petersfield Road	II	11, 13, 15 and 17, Petersfield Road			26 November 1987	SU8846221456; 50°59′09″N 0°44′28″W		1275850	Upload Photo	Q26565406
Bird, Potter And Co Ewen House (Bird, Potter And Co) Malcolm Whiteheads Midhurst Valet Service	II	Red Lion Street			18 June 1959	SU8867421472; 50°59′09″N 0°44′17″W		1275851	Upload Photo	Q26565407
Wheeler's Bookshop	II	Red Lion Street, GU29 9PB			18 June 1959	SU8867221458; 50°59′09″N 0°44′17″W		1234993	Wheeler's Bookshop	Q26528362
The Swan Inn	II	Red Lion Street			18 June 1959	SU8869121446; 50°59′08″N 0°44′16″W		1234674	The Swan Inn More images	Q26528061
Harveys Bottle and Jug	II	Red Lion Street			18 June 1959	SU8869121459; 50°59′09″N 0°44′16″W		1276013	Upload Photo	Q26565557
Sussex House	II	Red Lion Street			18 June 1959	SU8867121444; 50°59′08″N 0°44′17″W		1235048	Upload Photo	Q26528409
The Old Surgery	II	Rumbolds Hill			26 November 1987	SU8862321581; 50°59′13″N 0°44′20″W		1234660	Upload Photo	Q26528046
Hamlyn House	II	Rumbold's Hill, GU29 9ND			26 November 1987	SU8856721468; 50°59′09″N 0°44′23″W		1275808	Upload Photo	Q26565366
Knight Insurance (Midhurst) The Alliance And Leicester Building Society	II	Rumbold's Hill			26 November 1987	SU8860521530; 50°59′11″N 0°44′21″W		1275807	Upload Photo	Q26565365
Rumbold's House Sussex County Building Society	II	Rumbold's Hill			26 November 1987	SU8861221545; 50°59′11″N 0°44′20″W		1275806	Upload Photo	Q26565364
Asha Tandoori Restaurant	II	Rumbold's Hill			26 November 1987	SU8860421519; 50°59′11″N 0°44′21″W		1235056	Upload Photo	Q26528416
Regency House	II	Rumbold's Hill			26 November 1987	SU8858421532; 50°59′11″N 0°44′22″W		1275809	Upload Photo	Q26565367
The Wheatsheaf Inn	II	Rumbold's Hill			18 June 1959	SU8858821491; 50°59′10″N 0°44′21″W		1235057	The Wheatsheaf Inn More images	Q26528417
The Egmont Public House	II	Rumbold's Hill			18 June 1959	SU8855321482; 50°59′09″N 0°44′23″W		1275751	The Egmont Public House	Q26565311
E J Tomes Regency Building Society	II	Rumbold's Hill			26 November 1987	SU8860821537; 50°59′11″N 0°44′20″W		1235055	Upload Photo	Q26528415
Premises Occupied by Lamb and Glue Electrical Contractor	II	Rumbold's Hill			18 June 1959	SU8860121508; 50°59′10″N 0°44′21″W		1216717	Upload Photo	Q26511480
413 and 416, Rumbold's Hill	II	413 and 416, Rumbold's Hill			26 November 1987	SU8858621545; 50°59′11″N 0°44′21″W		1235059	413 and 416, Rumbold's Hill	Q26528419
414 and 415, Rumbold's Hill	II	414 and 415, Rumbold's Hill			26 November 1987	SU8857221475; 50°59′09″N 0°44′22″W		1275745	Upload Photo	Q26565305
Russet House	II	Sheep Lane			18 June 1959	SU8871221526; 50°59′11″N 0°44′15″W		1275810	Upload Photo	Q26565368
St Ann's House	II	Sheep Lane			26 November 1987	SU8876021525; 50°59′11″N 0°44′13″W		1216737	St Ann's House	Q26511499
St Anns	II	Sheep Lane			8 October 1998	SU8872721542; 50°59′11″N 0°44′14″W		1385470	Upload Photo	Q26665252
Brook House	II	South Street			26 November 1987	SU8871221382; 50°59′06″N 0°44′15″W		1275755	Upload Photo	Q26565315
The Old Market House	II	South Street, Island Site			18 June 1959	SU8869521427; 50°59′08″N 0°44′16″W		1216740	The Old Market House	Q26511501
The Spread Eagle Hotel	II*	South Street			18 June 1959	SU8868021412; 50°59′07″N 0°44′17″W		1216739	The Spread Eagle Hotel More images	Q26268194
South Pond House	II	South Street, GU29 9PD			18 June 1959	SU8871221343; 50°59′05″N 0°44′15″W		1235062	Upload Photo	Q26528422
1, 2 and 3, South Street	II	1, 2 and 3, South Street			26 November 1987	SU8871221394; 50°59′06″N 0°44′15″W		1235061	Upload Photo	Q26528421
6, South Street	II	6, South Street			18 June 1959	SU8871221352; 50°59′05″N 0°44′15″W		1275811	Upload Photo	Q26565369
Court Green	II	St Anne's Hill			26 November 1987	SU8880121440; 50°59′08″N 0°44′11″W		1216735	Court Green More images	Q26511498
342-347 St Anne's Hill And St Ann's Hall, Including Archway To Edinburgh Square	II	342, St Anne's Hill, GU29 9NN			22 December 2011	SU8876621439; 50°59′08″N 0°44′12″W		1405049	342-347 St Anne's Hill And St Ann's Hall, Including Archway To Edinburgh Square More images	Q26675705
The Jacobean Hall, The Spread Eagle Hotel	II	South Street			26 November 1987	SU8866621373; 50°59′06″N 0°44′18″W		1275756	Upload Photo	Q26565316
The Old School Room Of The Grammar School, To The North West Of The Old Building	II	North Street			18 June 1959	SU8864321893; 50°59′23″N 0°44′18″W		1234990	The Old School Room Of The Grammar School, To The North West Of The Old Building	Q26528359
West Gate House	II	West Street, GU29 9NQ			26 November 1987	SU8866321441; 50°59′08″N 0°44′18″W		1275757	Upload Photo	Q26565318
The Gateway to the Commandery	II	West Street			18 June 1959	SU8860421421; 50°59′07″N 0°44′21″W		1275759	Upload Photo	Q26565320
Midhurst Sports and House Adjoining	II	West Street			26 November 1987	SU8856121448; 50°59′08″N 0°44′23″W		1275758	Upload Photo	Q26565319
Jefferson's Butchers and Blackiston House	II	West Street			18 June 1959	SU8863721420; 50°59′07″N 0°44′19″W		1216743	Jefferson's Butchers and Blackiston House More images	Q26511505
Je Allnutt and Son Ltd	II	West Street, GU29 9NQ			15 December 2011	SU8860821413; 50°59′07″N 0°44′20″W		1405409	Je Allnutt and Son Ltd	Q26675729
Goldrings And Attached Buildings To Rear	II	West Street, GU29 9NQ			15 December 2011	SU8861921410; 50°59′07″N 0°44′20″W		1405443	Upload Photo	Q26675730
2 and 3, West Street	II	2 and 3, West Street, GU29 9NF			26 November 1987	SU8857121434; 50°59′08″N 0°44′22″W		1216742	Upload Photo	Q26511503
Chantry Cottage	II	Wool Lane			26 November 1987	SU8858721478; 50°59′09″N 0°44′21″W		1275761	Upload Photo	Q26565322
Wool Cottage	II	Wool Lane			26 November 1987	SU8860321472; 50°59′09″N 0°44′21″W		1216745	Upload Photo	Q26511507
The Bricklayers Arms Public House	II	Wool Lane			26 November 1987	SU8860721435; 50°59′08″N 0°44′21″W		1216854	The Bricklayers Arms Public House More images	Q26511606
Burnell House	II	Wool Lane			26 November 1987	SU8859021464; 50°59′09″N 0°44′21″W		1216747	Upload Photo	Q26511508
3, Wool Lane	II	3, Wool Lane			18 June 1959	SU8860121497; 50°59′10″N 0°44′21″W		1216744	Upload Photo	Q26511506

== See also ==
- Grade I listed buildings in West Sussex
- Grade II* listed buildings in West Sussex
- King Edward VII Hospital and Sanatorium (often shown as being in Midhurst)
