= Listed buildings in Chichester (within the city walls) =

Civil Parish in West Sussex, England

Chichester is a city and civil parish in the Chichester district, West Sussex, England. It contains 14 grade I, 33 grade II* and 472 grade II listed buildings that are recorded in the National Heritage List for England.

This list is based on the information retrieved online from Historic England. The quantity of listed buildings in Chichester requires subdivision into geographically defined lists. This list includes all listed buildings within the city walls.

== Key ==
Grade	Criteria
I	Buildings that are of exceptional interest
II*	Particularly important buildings of more than special interest
II	Buildings that are of special interest

== Listing ==
Name	Grade	Location	Type	Completed (Note: The date given is the date used by Historic England as significant for the initial building or that of an important part in the structure's description.)	Date designated	Grid ref. (Note: The grid reference is based on the British national grid reference system, sometimes known as OSGB36, used by the Ordnance Survey.) Geo-coordinates	Notes	Entry number (Note: The "List Entry Number" is a unique number assigned to each listed building and scheduled monument by Historic England.)	Image	Wikidata
The Market Cross	I				5 July 1950	SU8606204819; 50°50′11″N 0°46′45″W		1026826	The Market Cross More images	Q5095990
City Walls	I				8 October 1971	SU8589105149; 50°50′22″N 0°46′54″W		1354262	City Walls More images	Q17529010
Outbuilding Facing Baffins Lane to the North of Car Park Exit	II	Baffins Lane			8 October 1971	SU8628704744; 50°50′09″N 0°46′34″W		1354265	Upload Photo	Q26637134
Baffins Hall	II	Baffins Lane			5 July 1950	SU8627804714; 50°50′08″N 0°46′34″W		1026829	Upload Photo	Q26277786
The Southern Half of the Former Corn Exchange Now Occupied by John Wiley and Sons	II	Baffins Lane			5 July 1950	SU8630704723; 50°50′08″N 0°46′33″W		1026830	Upload Photo	Q26277787
Blackman House	II	Canon Lane			5 July 1950	SU8598504682; 50°50′07″N 0°46′49″W		1026798	Blackman House More images	Q26277757
Gates and Gateway to the Deanery	II	Canon Lane			8 October 1971	SU8591604684; 50°50′07″N 0°46′53″W		1026835	Gates and Gateway to the Deanery More images	Q26277793
The Close (between the Palace and the Deanery)	II	Canon Lane			5 July 1950	SU8589304688; 50°50′07″N 0°46′54″W		1354268	The Close (between the Palace and the Deanery) More images	Q26637136
The Chantry	II	Canon Lane			5 July 1950	SU8597404641; 50°50′06″N 0°46′50″W		1026836	The Chantry More images	Q26277794
The Deanery	II*	Canon Lane			5 July 1950	SU8590604643; 50°50′06″N 0°46′53″W		1287003	The Deanery More images	Q17531852
The Palace	I	Canon Lane			5 July 1950	SU8586904772; 50°50′10″N 0°46′55″W		1286999	The Palace More images	Q17529002
The Residentiary	II	Canon Lane			5 July 1950	SU8595604673; 50°50′07″N 0°46′51″W		1354269	The Residentiary More images	Q26637137
The Treasury	II	Canon Lane			8 October 1971	SU8591704745; 50°50′09″N 0°46′53″W		1191642	The Treasury More images	Q26486354
Garage Adjoining the Residentiary	II	Canon Lane			8 October 1971	SU8593904679; 50°50′07″N 0°46′51″W		1191629	Upload Photo	Q26486343
The Garden Walls of the Treasury	II	Canon Lane			8 October 1971	SU8590304699; 50°50′08″N 0°46′53″W		1026837	Upload Photo	Q26277795
Wall Separating the Drive from the Palace Gardens and Kitchen Garden	II	Canon Lane			5 July 1950	SU8583904740; 50°50′09″N 0°46′57″W		1026834	Upload Photo	Q26277791
6, Canon Lane	II	6, Canon Lane			5 July 1950	SU8595204694; 50°50′07″N 0°46′51″W		1026838	6, Canon Lane More images	Q26277796
Providence Chapel	II	Chapel Street			5 July 1950	SU8595505114; 50°50′21″N 0°46′50″W		1026807	Providence Chapel More images	Q26277767
Walls and Gate Piers Enclosing Providence Chapel	II	Chapel Street			8 October 1971	SU8596605117; 50°50′21″N 0°46′50″W		1354292	Upload Photo	Q26637159
House Adjoining Providence Chapel	II	Chapel Street			8 October 1971	SU8595005108; 50°50′21″N 0°46′51″W		1191754	Upload Photo	Q26486458
1-3, Chapel Street	II	1-3, Chapel Street			8 October 1971	SU8598304980; 50°50′17″N 0°46′49″W		1191746	Upload Photo	Q26486450
30, Chapel Street	II	30, Chapel Street			8 October 1971	SU8600604878; 50°50′13″N 0°46′48″W		1026808	Upload Photo	Q26277768
East Pallant Cottage	II	East Pallant			8 October 1971	SU8624204701; 50°50′08″N 0°46′36″W		1026814	East Pallant Cottage More images	Q26277773
Wall to East of East Pallant House	II	East Pallant			8 October 1971	SU8628304605; 50°50′04″N 0°46′34″W		1354295	Upload Photo	Q26637163
Wall Within Curtilage of East Pallant Cottage to the North	II	East Pallant			8 October 1971	SU8623204707; 50°50′08″N 0°46′36″W		1354297	Upload Photo	Q26637165
Wall to North East of East Pallant House	II	East Pallant			8 October 1971	SU8626004659; 50°50′06″N 0°46′35″W		1191879	Upload Photo	Q26486580
East Pallant House (chichester Rural District Council Offices)	II	East Pallant			5 July 1950	SU8623404653; 50°50′06″N 0°46′36″W		1026811	Upload Photo	Q26277770
2, East Pallant	II	2, East Pallant			5 July 1950	SU8620604641; 50°50′06″N 0°46′38″W		1191890	2, East Pallant More images	Q26486589
3, East Pallant	II	3, East Pallant			5 July 1950	SU8619804643; 50°50′06″N 0°46′38″W		1026812	3, East Pallant More images	Q26277771
4, East Pallant	II	4, East Pallant			5 July 1950	SU8618804647; 50°50′06″N 0°46′39″W		1354296	4, East Pallant More images	Q26637164
5, East Pallant	II*	5, East Pallant			8 October 1971	SU8617704644; 50°50′06″N 0°46′39″W		1286852	5, East Pallant More images	Q17531841
6, East Pallant	II	6, East Pallant			5 July 1950	SU8616504645; 50°50′06″N 0°46′40″W		1026813	6, East Pallant More images	Q26277772
7, East Pallant	II	7, East Pallant			5 July 1950	SU8615104645; 50°50′06″N 0°46′41″W		1191921	7, East Pallant More images	Q26486622
9-14, East Pallant	II	9-14, East Pallant			8 October 1971	SU8625604709; 50°50′08″N 0°46′35″W		1191929	9-14, East Pallant More images	Q26486628
Church of St Andrew	II*	East Street, Ox Market			5 July 1950	SU8622704835; 50°50′12″N 0°46′37″W		1026778	Church of St Andrew More images	Q17531074
Corn Exchange	II*	East Street, PO19 1JD			5 July 1950	SU8631204767; 50°50′10″N 0°46′32″W		1192106	Corn Exchange More images	Q17531122
Corner of East Row and Little London	II	East Row, PO19 1PD			19 January 2016	SU8631004926; 50°50′15″N 0°46′32″W		1429585	Upload Photo	Q26677539
Premises Occupied by No 7 (chichester) Cadet Platoon Queen's Regiment	II	East Row			8 October 1971	SU8639004953; 50°50′16″N 0°46′28″W		1191948	Upload Photo	Q26486645
1, East Row	II	1, East Row			5 July 1950	SU8630704938; 50°50′15″N 0°46′32″W		1026815	Upload Photo	Q26277774
2, East Row	II	2, East Row			5 July 1950	SU8634004943; 50°50′15″N 0°46′31″W		1026816	Upload Photo	Q26277775
Suffolk House	II	3, East Row			5 July 1950	SU8634904946; 50°50′15″N 0°46′30″W		1191940	Upload Photo	Q26486637
4, East Row	II	4, East Row			8 October 1971	SU8636404943; 50°50′15″N 0°46′30″W		1026817	Upload Photo	Q26277776
5, East Row	II	5, East Row			8 October 1971	SU8633204926; 50°50′15″N 0°46′31″W		1026818	Upload Photo	Q26277777
6, East Row	II	6, East Row			8 October 1971	SU8632304926; 50°50′15″N 0°46′32″W		1026819	Upload Photo	Q26277778
Wall to North of St Andrew Ox Market	II	East Street			8 October 1971	SU8623004845; 50°50′12″N 0°46′36″W		1354316	Upload Photo	Q26637182
4, East Street	II	4, East Street			8 October 1971	SU8609904828; 50°50′12″N 0°46′43″W		1286807	4, East Street More images	Q26575365
5 and 6, East Street	II	5 and 6, East Street			8 October 1971	SU8611204829; 50°50′12″N 0°46′43″W		1026820	5 and 6, East Street More images	Q26277779
12 and 13, East Street	II	12 and 13, East Street			8 October 1971	SU8615004822; 50°50′11″N 0°46′41″W		1026776	Upload Photo	Q26277735
14 and 15, East Street	II	14 and 15, East Street			8 October 1971	SU8616004820; 50°50′11″N 0°46′40″W		1026777	Upload Photo	Q26277736
21, East Street	II	21, East Street			16 July 1973	SU8619804821; 50°50′11″N 0°46′38″W		1026588	21, East Street More images	Q26277536
25, East Street	II	25, East Street			8 October 1971	SU8622204815; 50°50′11″N 0°46′37″W		1026779	25, East Street More images	Q26277737
26, East Street	II	26, East Street			8 October 1971	SU8622704814; 50°50′11″N 0°46′37″W		1354317	26, East Street More images	Q26637183
28 and 29, East Street	II	28 and 29, East Street			8 October 1971	SU8623904812; 50°50′11″N 0°46′36″W		1026780	28 and 29, East Street More images	Q26277738
30, East Street	II	30, East Street			8 October 1971	SU8624804811; 50°50′11″N 0°46′36″W		1354318	30, East Street More images	Q26637184
31 and 32, East Street	II	31 and 32, East Street			8 October 1971	SU8626004809; 50°50′11″N 0°46′35″W		1026781	31 and 32, East Street More images	Q26277739
33, East Street	II	33, East Street			8 October 1971	SU8626604808; 50°50′11″N 0°46′35″W		1026782	33, East Street More images	Q26277740
34 and 35, East Street	II	34 and 35, East Street			8 October 1971	SU8627204807; 50°50′11″N 0°46′34″W		1354319	34 and 35, East Street More images	Q26637185
36 and 37, East Street	II	36 and 37, East Street			8 October 1971	SU8628504808; 50°50′11″N 0°46′34″W		1026783	36 and 37, East Street More images	Q26277741
West Sussex Country Club	II	38, East Street			5 July 1950	SU8629904807; 50°50′11″N 0°46′33″W		1192044	West Sussex Country Club More images	Q26486736
39, East Street	II	39, East Street			8 October 1971	SU8630704806; 50°50′11″N 0°46′33″W		1354280	39, East Street More images	Q26637148
40, East Street	II	40, East Street			8 October 1971	SU8631304805; 50°50′11″N 0°46′32″W		1026784	40, East Street More images	Q26277742
41, East Street	II	41, East Street			5 July 1950	SU8631704805; 50°50′11″N 0°46′32″W		1192098	41, East Street More images	Q26486785
42 and 43, East Street	II	42 and 43, East Street			5 July 1950	SU8632504804; 50°50′11″N 0°46′32″W		1354281	42 and 43, East Street More images	Q26637149
45 and 46, East Street	II	45 and 46, East Street			5 July 1950	SU8635104800; 50°50′11″N 0°46′30″W		1026785	45 and 46, East Street More images	Q26277743
57, East Street	II	57, East Street			8 October 1971	SU8629004778; 50°50′10″N 0°46′33″W		1026786	57, East Street More images	Q26277744
The Fleece Inn	II	59 and 60, East Street			8 October 1971	SU8627504780; 50°50′10″N 0°46′34″W		1192130	The Fleece Inn More images	Q26486814
61 and 61a, East Street	II	61 and 61a, East Street			8 October 1971	SU8626204781; 50°50′10″N 0°46′35″W		1354282	61 and 61a, East Street More images	Q26637150
65, East Street	II	65, East Street			8 October 1971	SU8624404784; 50°50′10″N 0°46′36″W		1026787	Upload Photo	Q26277745
66, East Street	II	66, East Street			8 October 1971	SU8623704785; 50°50′10″N 0°46′36″W		1192148	Upload Photo	Q26486829
67, East Street	II	67, East Street			8 October 1971	SU8622804785; 50°50′10″N 0°46′37″W		1354283	67, East Street More images	Q26637151
68, East Street	II	68, East Street			8 October 1971	SU8622204787; 50°50′10″N 0°46′37″W		1192158	Upload Photo	Q26486843
71 and 72, East Street	II	71 and 72, East Street			5 July 1950	SU8620904788; 50°50′10″N 0°46′38″W		1026788	71 and 72, East Street More images	Q26277746
78 and 79, East Street	II	78 and 79, East Street			5 September 1969	SU8617604785; 50°50′10″N 0°46′39″W		1026789	78 and 79, East Street More images	Q26277748
83, East Street	II	83, East Street			8 October 1971	SU8614004795; 50°50′11″N 0°46′41″W		1192171	83, East Street More images	Q26486855
84-86, East Street	II	84-86, East Street			8 October 1971	SU8612904797; 50°50′11″N 0°46′42″W		1354284	84-86, East Street More images	Q26637152
87, East Street	II	87, East Street			8 October 1971	SU8612004799; 50°50′11″N 0°46′42″W		1026790	87, East Street More images	Q26277749
Former Royal Arms Public House	II*	92, East Street, PO19 1HA			5 July 1950	SU8609004802; 50°50′11″N 0°46′44″W		1192187	Former Royal Arms Public House More images	Q17531133
93, East Street	II*	93, East Street			8 October 1971	SU8608304802; 50°50′11″N 0°46′44″W		1354285	93, East Street More images	Q17531875
94, East Street	II	94, East Street			8 October 1971	SU8607404802; 50°50′11″N 0°46′44″W		1286712	94, East Street More images	Q26575281
Friary Close	II	Friary Lane			16 July 1971	SU8629604571; 50°50′03″N 0°46′33″W		1354307	Upload Photo	Q26637174
Gate Piers and Wall at Entrance to Friary Close to North	II	Friary Lane			16 July 1971	SU8628504582; 50°50′04″N 0°46′34″W		1026759	Upload Photo	Q26277717
Wall Enclosing Garden to West and South West of Friary Close	II	Friary Lane			16 July 1971	SU8627704571; 50°50′03″N 0°46′34″W		1026760	Upload Photo	Q26277718
1 and 2, Friary Lane	II	1 and 2, Friary Lane			8 July 1971	SU8630204683; 50°50′07″N 0°46′33″W		1026758	Upload Photo	Q26277716
Priory House (the Ship Hotel Annexe)	II	Guildhall Street			5 July 1950	SU8615505143; 50°50′22″N 0°46′40″W		1354308	Upload Photo	Q26637175
3, Guildhall Street	II	3, Guildhall Street			8 October 1971	SU8615805125; 50°50′21″N 0°46′40″W		1286533	Upload Photo	Q26575120
4, Guildhall Street	II	4, Guildhall Street			5 July 1950	SU8614705124; 50°50′21″N 0°46′40″W		1026761	Upload Photo	Q26277719
57, North Street, 5, Guildhall Street	II	57, North Street, 5, Guildhall Street			5 July 1950	SU8611305127; 50°50′21″N 0°46′42″W		1026719	Upload Photo	Q26277669
5, Guildhall Street	II	5, Guildhall Street			5 July 1950	SU8611605127; 50°50′21″N 0°46′42″W		1286538	Upload Photo	Q26575125
Stable Block To Former Swan Inn	II	6 and 7, Jay Walk, St Martins Street, PO19 1NP			8 October 1971	SU8613404862; 50°50′13″N 0°46′41″W		1026775	Upload Photo	Q26277734
1, Lion Street	II	1, Lion Street			8 October 1971	SU8612204971; 50°50′16″N 0°46′42″W		1026765	Upload Photo	Q26277723
2 and 3, Lion Street	II	2 and 3, Lion Street			8 October 1971	SU8613104970; 50°50′16″N 0°46′41″W		1286478	Upload Photo	Q26575074
4, Lion Street	II	4, Lion Street			8 October 1971	SU8614004970; 50°50′16″N 0°46′41″W		1354312	Upload Photo	Q26637179
5, Lion Street	II	5, Lion Street			5 July 1950	SU8614704970; 50°50′16″N 0°46′41″W		1026766	Upload Photo	Q26277724
6, Lion Street	II	6, Lion Street			5 July 1950	SU8616104969; 50°50′16″N 0°46′40″W		1286483	Upload Photo	Q26575078
Gate Piers to Friars Gate House	II	Corner With Little London			8 October 1971	SU8631005002; 50°50′17″N 0°46′32″W		1026771	Upload Photo	Q26277729
Warehouse in Yard between Nos 10 and 11	II	Little London			16 July 1971	SU8627404939; 50°50′15″N 0°46′34″W		1354314	Upload Photo	Q26637181
Garden Walls Enclosing Friars Gate House on North and West Sides	II	Little London			8 October 1971	SU8631905003; 50°50′17″N 0°46′32″W		1286433	Upload Photo	Q26575032
3, 3a and 3b, Little London	II	3, 3a and 3b, Little London			8 October 1971	SU8627904862; 50°50′13″N 0°46′34″W		1026767	Upload Photo	Q26277725
7, Little London	II	7, Little London			5 July 1950	SU8628504904; 50°50′14″N 0°46′34″W		1192760	Upload Photo	Q26487435
8, Little London	II	8, Little London			5 July 1950	SU8628904912; 50°50′14″N 0°46′33″W		1354313	Upload Photo	Q26637180
9, Little London	II	9, Little London			5 July 1950	SU8629004921; 50°50′15″N 0°46′33″W		1026768	Upload Photo	Q26277726
10, Little London	II	10, Little London			5 July 1950	SU8629204929; 50°50′15″N 0°46′33″W		1192767	Upload Photo	Q26487442
11 and 12, Little London	II	11 and 12, Little London			5 July 1950	SU8628904948; 50°50′15″N 0°46′33″W		1026769	Upload Photo	Q26277727
13 and 14, Little London	II	13 and 14, Little London			5 July 1950	SU8629004957; 50°50′16″N 0°46′33″W		1192772	Upload Photo	Q26487447
15 and 16, Little London	II	15 and 16, Little London			5 July 1950	SU8629004966; 50°50′16″N 0°46′33″W		1026770	Upload Photo	Q26277728
17-20, Little London	II	17-20, Little London			5 July 1950	SU8629404983; 50°50′17″N 0°46′33″W		1286464	Upload Photo	Q26575061
22 to 25, Little London	II	22 To 25, Little London			5 July 1950	SU8630604965; 50°50′16″N 0°46′32″W		1026773	Upload Photo	Q26277732
28, Little London	II	28, Little London			5 July 1950	SU8630504944; 50°50′15″N 0°46′33″W		1192813	Upload Photo	Q26487485
Sadlers Warehouse, Former Chichester City Museum	II	29, Little London, PO19 1PB			8 October 1971	SU8630704917; 50°50′14″N 0°46′32″W		1026774	Upload Photo	Q26277733
30, Little London	II	30, Little London			5 July 1950	SU8630704906; 50°50′14″N 0°46′32″W		1192835	Upload Photo	Q26487504
31 and 32, Little London	II	31 and 32, Little London			5 July 1950	SU8630404895; 50°50′14″N 0°46′33″W		1026728	Upload Photo	Q26277679
33 and 34, Little London	II	33 and 34, Little London			8 October 1971	SU8629904883; 50°50′13″N 0°46′33″W		1026729	Upload Photo	Q26277680
35, Little London	II	35, Little London			8 October 1971	SU8629904860; 50°50′13″N 0°46′33″W		1026730	Upload Photo	Q26277681
38, Little London	II	38, Little London			8 October 1971	SU8629904842; 50°50′12″N 0°46′33″W		1026731	Upload Photo	Q26277683
Prince Arthur Public House	II	41, Little London			8 October 1971	SU8630004827; 50°50′12″N 0°46′33″W		1026732	Upload Photo	Q26277684
1, New Town	II	1, New Town			8 October 1971	SU8633704691; 50°50′07″N 0°46′31″W		1026736	1, New Town More images	Q26277690
2 and 3, New Town	II	2 and 3, New Town			8 October 1971	SU8631704692; 50°50′07″N 0°46′32″W		1354337	Upload Photo	Q26637200
Wall, Railings And Gateway To Pallant House	II*	North Pallant			8 October 1971	SU8615204667; 50°50′06″N 0°46′41″W		1026744	Upload Photo	Q17531063
Wall Enclosing Garden to Nos 2 and 3 on North Side	II	North Pallant			8 October 1971	SU8618804741; 50°50′09″N 0°46′39″W		1026742	Upload Photo	Q26277699
Nos 1 and 1a (former Stables)	II	1 and 1a, North Pallant			5 July 1950	SU8617104751; 50°50′09″N 0°46′40″W		1026741	Nos 1 and 1a (former Stables) More images	Q26277698
2 and 3, North Pallant	II	2 and 3, North Pallant			5 July 1950	SU8617204739; 50°50′09″N 0°46′40″W		1286303	2 and 3, North Pallant More images	Q26574915
4, North Pallant	II	4, North Pallant			5 July 1950	SU8616904733; 50°50′09″N 0°46′40″W		1354301	4, North Pallant More images	Q26637169
5, North Pallant	II	5, North Pallant			5 July 1950	SU8616904721; 50°50′08″N 0°46′40″W		1193118	5, North Pallant More images	Q26487779
6, North Pallant	II	6, North Pallant			5 July 1950	SU8616804705; 50°50′08″N 0°46′40″W		1026743	6, North Pallant More images	Q26277701
7, North Pallant	II	7, North Pallant			5 July 1950	SU8616204693; 50°50′07″N 0°46′40″W		1193139	7, North Pallant More images	Q26487799
Pallant House	I	9, North Pallant			5 July 1950	SU8616104665; 50°50′06″N 0°46′40″W		1354302	Pallant House More images	Q17529014
10 and 11, North Pallant	II	10 and 11, North Pallant			8 October 1971	SU8614204686; 50°50′07″N 0°46′41″W		1193165	10 and 11, North Pallant More images	Q26487824
12, North Pallant	II	12, North Pallant			5 July 1950	SU8614504698; 50°50′07″N 0°46′41″W		1026745	12, North Pallant More images	Q26277702
City Club	II	13, North Pallant			5 July 1950	SU8614604710; 50°50′08″N 0°46′41″W		1354303	City Club More images	Q26637170
14 and 15, North Pallant	II	14 and 15, North Pallant			5 July 1950	SU8614804719; 50°50′08″N 0°46′41″W		1193188	14 and 15, North Pallant More images	Q26487845
16, North Pallant	II	16, North Pallant			5 July 1950	SU8614804732; 50°50′09″N 0°46′41″W		1026746	16, North Pallant More images	Q26277703
17, North Pallant	II	17, North Pallant			5 July 1950	SU8615104739; 50°50′09″N 0°46′41″W		1286284	17, North Pallant More images	Q26574897
18, North Pallant	II	18, North Pallant			5 July 1950	SU8615204745; 50°50′09″N 0°46′41″W		1354304	18, North Pallant More images	Q26637171
19, North Pallant	II	19, North Pallant			5 July 1950	SU8615004752; 50°50′09″N 0°46′41″W		1026747	19, North Pallant More images	Q26277704
The Council Chamber and Assembly Room	II*	North Street			5 July 1950	SU8611404955; 50°50′16″N 0°46′42″W		1354331	The Council Chamber and Assembly Room More images	Q17531927
The Ship Hotel	II*	North Street			5 July 1950	SU8612105143; 50°50′22″N 0°46′42″W		1026718	The Ship Hotel More images	Q17531053
The Former Church of St Olave	I	North Street			8 October 1971	SU8610104891; 50°50′14″N 0°46′43″W		1026724	The Former Church of St Olave More images	Q17528872
The Market House and Art Annexe of Chichester College of Further Education	II*	North Street			5 July 1950	SU8610004874; 50°50′13″N 0°46′43″W		1354333	The Market House and Art Annexe of Chichester College of Further Education More images	Q17531939
1, North Street	II	1, North Street			11 September 1969	SU8606404834; 50°50′12″N 0°46′45″W		1193210	1, North Street More images	Q26487865
2, North Street	II	2, North Street			8 October 1971	SU8606504839; 50°50′12″N 0°46′45″W		1354305	2, North Street More images	Q26637172
6, North Street	II	6, North Street			8 October 1971	SU8606404859; 50°50′13″N 0°46′45″W		1026748	6, North Street More images	Q26277705
7 and 8, North Street	II	7 and 8, North Street			8 October 1971	SU8606604867; 50°50′13″N 0°46′45″W		1286232	7 and 8, North Street More images	Q26574851
9, North Street	II	9, North Street			8 October 1971	SU8606704874; 50°50′13″N 0°46′45″W		1026749	9, North Street More images	Q26277706
12, North Street	II	12, North Street			8 October 1971	SU8607204893; 50°50′14″N 0°46′45″W		1286241	Upload Photo	Q26574859
13, North Street	II	13, North Street			8 October 1971	SU8607204899; 50°50′14″N 0°46′45″W		1026750	Upload Photo	Q26277707
22 and 22a, North Street	II	22 and 22a, North Street			8 October 1971	SU8607604962; 50°50′16″N 0°46′44″W		1026751	Upload Photo	Q26277708
23 and 24, North Street	II	23 and 24, North Street			5 July 1950	SU8607704973; 50°50′16″N 0°46′44″W		1026706	23 and 24, North Street More images	Q26277659
27 and 28, North Street	II	27 and 28, North Street			5 July 1950	SU8607805007; 50°50′18″N 0°46′44″W		1026707	27 and 28, North Street More images	Q26277661
29, North Street	II	29, North Street			5 July 1950	SU8607805016; 50°50′18″N 0°46′44″W		1026708	29, North Street More images	Q26277662
30, North Street	II	30, North Street			5 July 1950	SU8607805021; 50°50′18″N 0°46′44″W		1026709	30, North Street More images	Q26277663
31, North Street	II*	31, North Street			5 July 1950	SU8607805030; 50°50′18″N 0°46′44″W		1026710	31, North Street More images	Q17531019
32 and 32a, North Street	II	32 and 32a, North Street			5 July 1950	SU8607805045; 50°50′19″N 0°46′44″W		1026711	32 and 32a, North Street More images	Q26277664
35, 36a and 36, North Street	II	35, 36a and 36, North Street			5 July 1950	SU8608205068; 50°50′19″N 0°46′44″W		1026712	35, 36a and 36, North Street More images	Q26277665
Lindenau School	II	37, North Street			5 July 1950	SU8608305077; 50°50′20″N 0°46′44″W		1026713	Lindenau School More images	Q26277666
38 and 39, North Street	II	38 and 39, North Street			5 July 1950	SU8608305090; 50°50′20″N 0°46′44″W		1354325	38 and 39, North Street More images	Q26637191
Fernleigh	II*	40, North Street			8 October 1971	SU8607105106; 50°50′21″N 0°46′44″W		1026714	Fernleigh More images	Q17531031
41 and 42, North Street	II*	41 and 42, North Street			5 July 1950	SU8608905126; 50°50′21″N 0°46′43″W		1354326	41 and 42, North Street More images	Q17531914
43, North Street	II*	43, North Street			5 July 1950	SU8609405140; 50°50′22″N 0°46′43″W		1026715	43, North Street More images	Q17531042
44, North Street	II	44, North Street			8 October 1971	SU8609105165; 50°50′23″N 0°46′43″W		1026716	44, North Street More images	Q26277667
45-48, North Street	II	45-48, North Street			8 October 1971	SU8609505179; 50°50′23″N 0°46′43″W		1193352	45-48, North Street More images	Q26488004
50, North Street	II	50, North Street			8 October 1971	SU8612105201; 50°50′24″N 0°46′42″W		1354327	50, North Street More images	Q26637192
George and Dragon Public House	II	51, North Street			8 October 1971	SU8612105188; 50°50′23″N 0°46′42″W		1193375	George and Dragon Public House More images	Q26488043
52, North Street	II	52, North Street			8 October 1971	SU8612005172; 50°50′23″N 0°46′42″W		1026717	52, North Street More images	Q26277668
53, North Street	II	53, North Street			8 October 1971	SU8611905163; 50°50′23″N 0°46′42″W		1354328	53, North Street More images	Q26637193
54, 55, and 56 North Street	II	54, 55, And 56, North Street			8 October 1971	SU8611905157; 50°50′22″N 0°46′42″W		1193388	54, 55, and 56 North Street More images	Q26488055
58, North Street	II	58, North Street			8 October 1971	SU8611405120; 50°50′21″N 0°46′42″W		1193405	58, North Street More images	Q26488071
59 and 60, North Street	II	59 and 60, North Street			5 July 1950	SU8611405110; 50°50′21″N 0°46′42″W		1354329	59 and 60, North Street More images	Q26637194
Greyfriars (city Council Offices)	II	61, North Street			5 July 1950	SU8611205089; 50°50′20″N 0°46′42″W		1193418	Greyfriars (city Council Offices) More images	Q26488083
62 and 63, North Street	II	62 and 63, North Street			18 June 1970	SU8610905072; 50°50′20″N 0°46′42″W		1026720	62 and 63, North Street More images	Q26277671
68, North Street	II	68, North Street			8 October 1971	SU8610304991; 50°50′17″N 0°46′43″W		1354330	68, North Street More images	Q26637195
Garden Wall on North Side of No 68	II	68, North Street			8 October 1971	SU8615805002; 50°50′17″N 0°46′40″W		1286146	Upload Photo	Q26574778
69, North Street	II	69, North Street			8 October 1971	SU8610304984; 50°50′17″N 0°46′43″W		1026721	69, North Street More images	Q26277672
70 and 70a, North Street	II	70 and 70a, North Street			8 October 1971	SU8610304978; 50°50′17″N 0°46′43″W		1026722	70 and 70a, North Street More images	Q26277673
71 and 72, North Street	II	71 and 72, North Street			8 October 1971	SU8610304969; 50°50′16″N 0°46′43″W		1193517	71 and 72, North Street More images	Q26488175
74, 75 and 75a, North Street	II	74, 75 and 75a, North Street			8 October 1971	SU8610204930; 50°50′15″N 0°46′43″W		1193538	74, 75 and 75a, North Street More images	Q26488194
76 and 77, North Street	II	76 and 77, North Street			8 October 1971	SU8610404922; 50°50′15″N 0°46′43″W		1026723	Upload Photo	Q26277674
78, 79 and 80, North Street	II	78, 79 and 80, North Street			8 October 1971	SU8609904911; 50°50′14″N 0°46′43″W		1354332	78, 79 and 80, North Street More images	Q26637196
81, North Street	II	81, North Street			8 October 1971	SU8609804897; 50°50′14″N 0°46′43″W		1193559	Upload Photo	Q26488216
83 and 83a, North Street	II	83 and 83a, North Street			8 October 1971	SU8609304856; 50°50′13″N 0°46′43″W		1286103	Upload Photo	Q26574739
84 and 85, North Street	II	84 and 85, North Street			8 October 1971	SU8609004847; 50°50′12″N 0°46′44″W		1026725	Upload Photo	Q26277675
86 and 87, North Street	II*	86 and 87, North Street			8 October 1971	SU8608804839; 50°50′12″N 0°46′44″W		1193602	Upload Photo	Q17531143
10, North Walls	II	10, North Walls			8 October 1971	SU8572004963; 50°50′16″N 0°47′02″W		1026726	10, North Walls More images	Q26277676
22, North Walls	II	22, North Walls			8 October 1971	SU8606405184; 50°50′23″N 0°46′45″W		1354334	22, North Walls More images	Q26637197
23, North Walls	II	23, North Walls			8 October 1971	SU8607105186; 50°50′23″N 0°46′44″W		1193623	23, North Walls More images	Q26488271
24 and 25, North Walls	II	24 and 25, North Walls			8 October 1971	SU8607705188; 50°50′23″N 0°46′44″W		1026727	24 and 25, North Walls More images	Q26277677
Wall Enclosing Garden to East Side of Friars Gate House	II	Priory Road, Corner With East Walls			8 October 1971	SU8635105007; 50°50′17″N 0°46′30″W		1026772	Upload Photo	Q26277730
Chancel of the Church of the Grey Friars	I	Priory Road			5 July 1950	SU8623905124; 50°50′21″N 0°46′36″W		1026695	Chancel of the Church of the Grey Friars More images	Q5096000
Friars Gate House	II*	Priory Road Corner With Little London			5 July 1950	SU8632704985; 50°50′17″N 0°46′31″W		1354315	Friars Gate House More images	Q17531888
6, Priory Road	II	6, Priory Road			8 October 1971	SU8625805010; 50°50′18″N 0°46′35″W		1354357	Upload Photo	Q26637218
7 and 8, Priory Road	II	7 and 8, Priory Road			8 October 1971	SU8623905011; 50°50′18″N 0°46′36″W		1286008	Upload Photo	Q26574651
Cawley Priory	II	South Pallant			8 October 1971	SU8614204545; 50°50′03″N 0°46′41″W		1026650	Upload Photo	Q26277605
1, South Pallant	II	1, South Pallant			8 October 1971	SU8614804636; 50°50′05″N 0°46′41″W		1026648	1, South Pallant More images	Q26277603
2-4, South Pallant	II	2-4, South Pallant			8 October 1971	SU8614704629; 50°50′05″N 0°46′41″W		1026649	Upload Photo	Q26277604
5, South Pallant	II	5, South Pallant			5 July 1950	SU8614704619; 50°50′05″N 0°46′41″W		1354374	5, South Pallant More images	Q26637235
11 and 12, South Pallant	II	11 and 12, South Pallant			8 October 1971	SU8611304578; 50°50′04″N 0°46′43″W		1194651	Upload Photo	Q26489267
No 13 and Outbuildings to South	II	13, South Pallant			8 October 1971	SU8611804590; 50°50′04″N 0°46′42″W		1354375	No 13 and Outbuildings to South More images	Q26637236
15 and 16, South Pallant	II	15 and 16, South Pallant			8 October 1971	SU8612504607; 50°50′05″N 0°46′42″W		1285577	Upload Photo	Q26574259
Canon Gate	I	South Street			5 July 1950	SU8603004664; 50°50′06″N 0°46′47″W		1026655	Canon Gate More images	Q17528854
Vicar's Hall and Crypt	I	South Street			5 July 1950	SU8602404735; 50°50′09″N 0°46′47″W		1026653	Vicar's Hall and Crypt More images	Q17528850
8, South Street	II	8, South Street			8 October 1971	SU8604104771; 50°50′10″N 0°46′46″W		1026651	8, South Street More images	Q26277606
9 and 10, South Street	II	9 and 10, South Street			8 October 1971	SU8604204760; 50°50′10″N 0°46′46″W		1354376	9 and 10, South Street More images	Q26637237
11, South Street	II	11, South Street			8 October 1971	SU8604104750; 50°50′09″N 0°46′46″W		1285583	11, South Street More images	Q26574265
12 and 13, South Street	II	12 and 13, South Street			8 October 1971	SU8603904743; 50°50′09″N 0°46′46″W		1026652	12 and 13, South Street More images	Q26277607
14-16, South Street	II	14-16, South Street			8 October 1971	SU8603504718; 50°50′08″N 0°46′47″W		1285559	14-16, South Street More images	Q26574244
17 and 18, South Street	II*	17 and 18, South Street			8 October 1971	SU8603304706; 50°50′08″N 0°46′47″W		1354377	17 and 18, South Street More images	Q17531961
19, South Street	II*	19, South Street			8 October 1971	SU8603204696; 50°50′07″N 0°46′47″W		1285563	19, South Street More images	Q17531800
19a, South Street	II*	19a, South Street			8 October 1971	SU8603404689; 50°50′07″N 0°46′47″W		1026654	19a, South Street More images	Q17530972
20, South Street	II*	20, South Street			5 July 1950	SU8603004685; 50°50′07″N 0°46′47″W		1354378	20, South Street More images	Q17531973
21-23, South Street	II*	21-23, South Street			8 October 1971	SU8602904675; 50°50′07″N 0°46′47″W		1285567	21-23, South Street More images	Q17531817
24 and 25, South Street	II	24 and 25, South Street			8 October 1971	SU8602704656; 50°50′06″N 0°46′47″W		1026656	24 and 25, South Street More images	Q17528858
27, South Street	II	27, South Street			5 July 1950	SU8602404640; 50°50′06″N 0°46′47″W		1285195	27, South Street More images	Q26573908
28 and 29, South Street	II	28 and 29, South Street			8 October 1971	SU8602304632; 50°50′05″N 0°46′47″W		1354379	28 and 29, South Street More images	Q26637238
30, South Street	II	30, South Street			8 October 1971	SU8601904611; 50°50′05″N 0°46′47″W		1181059	30, South Street More images	Q26476407
37a, South Street	II	37a, South Street, PO19 1EL			5 July 1950	SU8601804577; 50°50′04″N 0°46′48″W		1026657	Upload Photo	Q26277608
38, South Street	II	38, South Street, PO19 1EL			8 October 1971	SU8601604570; 50°50′03″N 0°46′48″W		1354340	38, South Street More images	Q26637203
39-41, South Street	II	39-41, South Street			8 October 1971	SU8601604561; 50°50′03″N 0°46′48″W		1181066	Upload Photo	Q26476413
The Old Theatre	II	43, South Street			8 October 1971	SU8604504554; 50°50′03″N 0°46′46″W		1026658	The Old Theatre More images	Q26277609
44, South Street	II*	44, South Street			5 July 1950	SU8604404564; 50°50′03″N 0°46′46″W		1181076	44, South Street More images	Q17531110
45 and 45a, South Street	II*	45 and 45a, South Street			5 July 1950	SU8605304590; 50°50′04″N 0°46′46″W		1026659	45 and 45a, South Street More images	Q17530984
Richmond House	II*	47, South Street			5 July 1950	SU8605204608; 50°50′05″N 0°46′46″W		1354341	Richmond House More images	Q17531950
48, South Street	II	48, South Street			8 October 1971	SU8605204613; 50°50′05″N 0°46′46″W		1181107	48, South Street More images	Q26476449
The King's Head	II	50, South Street			8 October 1971	SU8605204631; 50°50′05″N 0°46′46″W		1026660	The King's Head More images	Q26277611
51 and 51a, South Street	II	51 and 51a, South Street			8 October 1971	SU8605304641; 50°50′06″N 0°46′46″W		1354342	51 and 51a, South Street More images	Q26637204
52, South Street	II	52, South Street			8 October 1971	SU8605404653; 50°50′06″N 0°46′46″W		1285154	52, South Street More images	Q26573868
Farington House	II	54, South Street			8 October 1971	SU8605404668; 50°50′07″N 0°46′46″W		1026661	Farington House More images	Q26277612
56 and 56a, South Street	II	56 and 56a, South Street			8 October 1971	SU8605604689; 50°50′07″N 0°46′46″W		1354362	56 and 56a, South Street More images	Q26637223
57-59, South Street	II	57-59, South Street			8 October 1971	SU8605804700; 50°50′08″N 0°46′45″W		1026617	57-59, South Street More images	Q26277569
60, South Street	II	60, South Street			8 October 1971	SU8605804709; 50°50′08″N 0°46′45″W		1354363	60, South Street More images	Q26637224
61, South Street	II	61, South Street, PO19 1EE			5 July 1950	SU8606004721; 50°50′08″N 0°46′45″W		1026618	61, South Street More images	Q26277571
64, South Street	II	64, South Street			8 October 1971	SU8606604746; 50°50′09″N 0°46′45″W		1026619	64, South Street More images	Q26277572
Number 65, Granary (Behind Ground Floor Shop Of Number 65) And Number 66	II	65, South Street			8 October 1971	SU8606704754; 50°50′09″N 0°46′45″W		1026620	Upload Photo	Q26277573
67 and 68, South Street	II	67 and 68, South Street			8 October 1971	SU8606804762; 50°50′10″N 0°46′45″W		1026621	67 and 68, South Street More images	Q26277574
70 and 71, South Street	II	70 and 71, South Street			8 October 1971	SU8607104777; 50°50′10″N 0°46′45″W		1026622	70 and 71, South Street More images	Q26277575
74 and 75, South Street	II	74 and 75, South Street			8 October 1971	SU8607004796; 50°50′11″N 0°46′45″W		1026623	Upload Photo	Q26277576
Exchange Building	II	St Johns Street, PO19 1UP			8 October 1971	SU8632704731; 50°50′08″N 0°46′32″W		1193922	Upload Photo	Q26488561
Gate Piers Before Church of St John the Evangelist	II	St John's Street			8 October 1971	SU8635404708; 50°50′08″N 0°46′30″W		1354358	Gate Piers Before Church of St John the Evangelist More images	Q26637219
St Pancras Rectory	II	St John's Street			8 October 1971	SU8635404642; 50°50′06″N 0°46′30″W		1354359	St Pancras Rectory More images	Q26637220
18a, St John's St	II	18a, St John's Street, PO19 1UP			8 October 1971	SU8633804712; 50°50′08″N 0°46′31″W		1026699	Upload Photo	Q26277654
Former Church of St John the Evangelist	I	St John's Street			5 July 1950	SU8638104706; 50°50′08″N 0°46′29″W		1026696	Former Church of St John the Evangelist More images	Q7593773
Keswick House	II	4, St John's Street			8 October 1971	SU8636104723; 50°50′08″N 0°46′30″W		1285976	Keswick House More images	Q26574621
5 and 6, St John's Street	II	5 and 6, St John's Street			8 October 1971	SU8635804686; 50°50′07″N 0°46′30″W		1193859	5 and 6, St John's Street More images	Q26488501
8, St John's Street	II	8, St John's Street			5 July 1950	SU8635504659; 50°50′06″N 0°46′30″W		1026697	8, St John's Street More images	Q26277652
Southdown	II	10, St John's Street			8 October 1971	SU8634004608; 50°50′04″N 0°46′31″W		1193877	Upload Photo	Q26488518
11-14, St John's Street	II	11-14, St John's Street			8 October 1971	SU8633304655; 50°50′06″N 0°46′31″W		1026698	11-14, St John's Street More images	Q26277653
15 and 16, St John's Street	II	15 and 16, St John's Street			8 October 1971	SU8633604680; 50°50′07″N 0°46′31″W		1193902	15 and 16, St John's Street More images	Q26488543
17, St John's Street	II	17, St John's Street			8 October 1971	SU8633704687; 50°50′07″N 0°46′31″W		1354320	17, St John's Street More images	Q26637187
St Martin's Hall	II	St Martin's Square			8 October 1971	SU8620604990; 50°50′17″N 0°46′38″W		1194016	St Martin's Hall More images	Q26488653
The Ruined Walls of the Former St Martin's Church	II	St Martin's Square			8 October 1971	SU8618104918; 50°50′15″N 0°46′39″W		1026705	Upload Photo	Q26277658
St Mary's Hospital Almshouses	II	St Martin's Square			8 October 1971	SU8620804960; 50°50′16″N 0°46′38″W		1354323	Upload Photo	Q26637190
St Mary's Hospital	I	St Martin's Square			5 July 1950	SU8624404937; 50°50′15″N 0°46′36″W		1026704	St Mary's Hospital More images	Q17528862
1a, St Martin's Square	II	1a, St Martin's Square			8 October 1971	SU8616604927; 50°50′15″N 0°46′40″W		1026700	Upload Photo	Q26277655
1, St Martin's Square	II	1, St Martin's Square			5 July 1950	SU8616804937; 50°50′15″N 0°46′40″W		1193936	Upload Photo	Q26488575
2, St Martin's Square	II	2, St Martin's Square			5 July 1950	SU8616804951; 50°50′16″N 0°46′40″W		1354321	Upload Photo	Q26637188
St Martin's House	II*	3, St Martin's Square			5 July 1950	SU8618504967; 50°50′16″N 0°46′39″W		1026701	St Martin's House More images	Q17530996
4, St Martin's Square	II	4, St Martin's Square			8 October 1971	SU8618304994; 50°50′17″N 0°46′39″W		1285902	Upload Photo	Q26574559
5, St Martin's Square	II	5, St Martin's Square			8 October 1971	SU8618305037; 50°50′18″N 0°46′39″W		1354322	Upload Photo	Q26637189
8, St Martin's Square	II*	8, St Martin's Square			5 July 1950	SU8619805034; 50°50′18″N 0°46′38″W		1026702	8, St Martin's Square More images	Q17531007
9 and 10, St Martin's Square	II	9 and 10, St Martin's Square			8 October 1971	SU8620105007; 50°50′17″N 0°46′38″W		1285904	Upload Photo	Q26574561
11 and 12, St Martin's Square	II	11 and 12, St Martin's Square			8 October 1971	SU8620404998; 50°50′17″N 0°46′38″W		1026703	Upload Photo	Q26277657
20, St Martin's Square	II*	20, St Martin's Square			5 July 1950	SU8619904942; 50°50′15″N 0°46′38″W		1285911	20, St Martin's Square More images	Q17531828
21, St Martin's Square	II*	21, St Martin's Square			5 July 1950	SU8618504935; 50°50′15″N 0°46′39″W		1354324	21, St Martin's Square More images	Q17531903
2 and 3, St Martin's Street	II	2 and 3, St Martin's Street			5 July 1950	SU8615804880; 50°50′13″N 0°46′40″W		1026662	Upload Photo	Q26277613
Garden Walls of No 2	II	St Richard's Walk, The Close			8 October 1971	SU8592804711; 50°50′08″N 0°46′52″W		1194546	Garden Walls of No 2 More images	Q26489167
1, St Richard's Walk	II	1, St Richard's Walk, The Close			5 July 1950	SU8594304740; 50°50′09″N 0°46′51″W		1285665	1, St Richard's Walk More images	Q26574339
2, St Richard's Walk	II	2, St Richard's Walk, The Close			5 July 1950	SU8593804726; 50°50′09″N 0°46′52″W		1354352	2, St Richard's Walk More images	Q26637213
The Royal Chantry (entrance in the Cloisters)	I	The Close			5 July 1950	SU8597004722; 50°50′08″N 0°46′50″W		1026810	The Royal Chantry (entrance in the Cloisters) More images	Q17528876
St Faiths House	II	1, The Close			5 July 1950	SU8599304738; 50°50′09″N 0°46′49″W		1026809	Upload Photo	Q26277769
St Faiths	II	2, The Close			5 July 1950	SU8600604740; 50°50′09″N 0°46′48″W		1191803	Upload Photo	Q26486508
5-9, Theatre Lane	II	5-9, Theatre Lane			8 October 1971	SU8608404523; 50°50′02″N 0°46′44″W		1181236	Upload Photo	Q26476569
West Sussex Library	II	Tower Street. PO19 1QJ			30 April 2015	SU8587304938; 50°50′15″N 0°46′55″W		1425462	West Sussex Library More images	Q26677197
Wall Within Curtilage of No 1 to South and West	II	Tower Street			8 October 1971	SU8588604889; 50°50′14″N 0°46′54″W		1354364	Upload Photo	Q26637225
1, Tower Street	II	1, Tower Street			8 October 1971	SU8589604892; 50°50′14″N 0°46′54″W		1026627	Upload Photo	Q26277581
2-4, Tower Street	II	2-4, Tower Street			8 October 1971	SU8589404904; 50°50′14″N 0°46′54″W		1285089	Upload Photo	Q26573808
The Cottage	II	6, Tower Street			8 October 1971	SU8589204914; 50°50′15″N 0°46′54″W		1026628	Upload Photo	Q26277582
51 and 52, Tower Street	II	51 and 52, Tower Street			8 October 1971	SU8591204901; 50°50′14″N 0°46′53″W		1285096	Upload Photo	Q26573814
53-56, Tower Street	II	53-56, Tower Street			8 October 1971	SU8591504878; 50°50′13″N 0°46′53″W		1354365	Upload Photo	Q26637226
1-4, Vicar's Close	II*	1-4, Vicar's Close			5 July 1950	SU8600704705; 50°50′08″N 0°46′48″W		1026629	Upload Photo	Q26263383
Former Church of All Saints in the Pallant	II	West Pallant			5 July 1950	SU8610304706; 50°50′08″N 0°46′43″W		1181561	Former Church of All Saints in the Pallant More images	Q26476875
All Saints Chapel, Former TOC H meeting House	II	West Pallant, PO19 1TD			8 October 1971	SU8610204697; 50°50′07″N 0°46′43″W		1354395	Upload Photo	Q26637253
1, West Pallant	II	1, West Pallant, PO19 1TD			5 July 1950	SU8610504692; 50°50′07″N 0°46′43″W		1026607	1, West Pallant More images	Q26277559
2 and 3, West Pallant	II	2 and 3, West Pallant, PO19 1TD			8 October 1971	SU8610904687; 50°50′07″N 0°46′43″W		1181573	2 and 3, West Pallant More images	Q26476887
4, West Pallant	II	4, West Pallant, PO19 1TD			5 July 1950	SU8611604684; 50°50′07″N 0°46′42″W		1354396	4, West Pallant More images	Q26637254
5, West Pallant	II	5, West Pallant			5 July 1950	SU8612404679; 50°50′07″N 0°46′42″W		1026608	5, West Pallant More images	Q26277560
6-8, West Pallant	II	6-8, West Pallant			5 July 1950	SU8613604673; 50°50′07″N 0°46′41″W		1284930	6-8, West Pallant More images	Q26573663
9, West Pallant	II	9, West Pallant			5 July 1950	SU8613604653; 50°50′06″N 0°46′41″W		1026609	9, West Pallant More images	Q26277562
10, West Pallant	II	10, West Pallant			5 July 1950	SU8612504655; 50°50′06″N 0°46′42″W		1181588	10, West Pallant More images	Q26476900
11, West Pallant	II	11, West Pallant			5 July 1950	SU8611404662; 50°50′06″N 0°46′43″W		1354397	11, West Pallant More images	Q26637255
12, West Pallant	II	12, West Pallant			5 July 1950	SU8610004666; 50°50′06″N 0°46′43″W		1026610	12, West Pallant More images	Q26277563
Outbuilding to North West of No 12	II	12, West Pallant			8 October 1971	SU8608904689; 50°50′07″N 0°46′44″W		1181600	Outbuilding to North West of No 12 More images	Q26476911
The John Edes House	I	West Street			5 July 1950	SU8579804880; 50°50′14″N 0°46′59″W		1026616	The John Edes House More images	Q17528846
The Cathedral Church of the Holy Trinity and Cloisters	I	West Street			5 July 1950	SU8595604776; 50°50′10″N 0°46′51″W		1354261	The Cathedral Church of the Holy Trinity and Cloisters More images	Q1736182
Bell Tower of the Cathedral	I	West Street			5 July 1950	SU8591204830; 50°50′12″N 0°46′53″W		1026825	Bell Tower of the Cathedral More images	Q21409383
Former Church of St Peter the Great	II	West Street			5 July 1950	SU8589204868; 50°50′13″N 0°46′54″W		1026613	Former Church of St Peter the Great More images	Q26277566
The Dolphin and Anchor Hotel	II	West Street			5 July 1950	SU8602304842; 50°50′12″N 0°46′47″W		1181611	The Dolphin and Anchor Hotel More images	Q26476920
Garden Wall Behind Langley House to North and East Sides	II	West Street			8 October 1971	SU8578204897; 50°50′14″N 0°46′59″W		1026572	Upload Photo	Q26277519
1a, 1 and 2, West Street	II	1a, 1 and 2, West Street			8 October 1971	SU8605504834; 50°50′12″N 0°46′45″W		1354398	1a, 1 and 2, West Street More images	Q26637256
3 and 4, West Street	II	3 and 4, West Street			8 October 1971	SU8604904834; 50°50′12″N 0°46′46″W		1026611	3 and 4, West Street More images	Q26277564
11, West Street	II	11, West Street			8 October 1971	SU8596704850; 50°50′12″N 0°46′50″W		1354399	11, West Street More images	Q26637257
15 and 16, West Streez	II	15 and 16, West Street			8 October 1971	SU8593404856; 50°50′13″N 0°46′52″W		1181636	15 and 16, West Streez More images	Q26476942
17 and 18, West Street	II	17 and 18, West Street			8 October 1971	SU8591604859; 50°50′13″N 0°46′53″W		1026612	17 and 18, West Street More images	Q26277565
21, West Street	II	21, West Street			8 October 1971	SU8586504865; 50°50′13″N 0°46′55″W		1181660	21, West Street More images	Q26476963
22, West Street	II	22, West Street			5 July 1950	SU8585804865; 50°50′13″N 0°46′55″W		1354360	22, West Street More images	Q26637221
23, West Street	II	23, West Street			5 July 1950	SU8584604866; 50°50′13″N 0°46′56″W		1181671	23, West Street More images	Q26476974
24, West Street	II	24, West Street			5 July 1950	SU8583504867; 50°50′13″N 0°46′57″W		1026614	24, West Street More images	Q26277567
24a, West Street	II	24a, West Street			8 October 1971	SU8582804868; 50°50′13″N 0°46′57″W		1354361	24a, West Street More images	Q26637222
25 and 25a, West Street	II	25 and 25a, West Street			8 October 1971	SU8582204869; 50°50′13″N 0°46′57″W		1284898	25 and 25a, West Street More images	Q26573633
Garden Wall Behind No 25 on West Side Only	II	25, West Street			8 October 1971	SU8581804885; 50°50′14″N 0°46′58″W		1026615	Upload Photo	Q26277568
Langley House	II	27, West Street			5 July 1950	SU8577304874; 50°50′13″N 0°47′00″W		1181695	Langley House More images	Q26476996
28, West Street	II	28, West Street			8 October 1971	SU8576504874; 50°50′13″N 0°47′00″W		1354381	28, West Street More images	Q26637240
29, West Street	II	29, West Street			8 October 1971	SU8575904874; 50°50′13″N 0°47′01″W		1026573	29, West Street More images	Q26277520
30 and 31, West Street	II	30 and 31, West Street			8 October 1971	SU8575304874; 50°50′13″N 0°47′01″W		1026574	30 and 31, West Street More images	Q26277522
32 and 33, West Street	II	32 and 33, West Street			8 October 1971	SU8574504874; 50°50′13″N 0°47′01″W		1354382	32 and 33, West Street More images	Q26637241
The Chichester Inn	II	38, West Street, PO19 1RP			8 October 1971	SU8572004851; 50°50′13″N 0°47′03″W		1026575	The Chichester Inn More images	Q26277523
39a, 39 to 41, West Street	II	39a, 39 To 41, West Street			8 October 1971	SU8573004852; 50°50′13″N 0°47′02″W		1026576	Upload Photo	Q26277524
46, West Street	II	46, West Street			5 July 1950	SU8577704847; 50°50′13″N 0°47′00″W		1026577	Upload Photo	Q26277525
48, West Street	II	48, West Street			5 July 1950	SU8579504845; 50°50′12″N 0°46′59″W		1026578	48, West Street More images	Q26277526
49, West Street	II	49, West Street			5 July 1950	SU8580204844; 50°50′12″N 0°46′58″W		1026579	49, West Street More images	Q26277527
50, West Street	II	50, West Street			5 July 1950	SU8581204845; 50°50′12″N 0°46′58″W		1026580	50, West Street More images	Q26277528
The Prebendal School	II	52, West Street			8 October 1971	SU8583604840; 50°50′12″N 0°46′57″W		1026581	The Prebendal School More images	Q99937499
Prebendal School House	II	53, West Street			5 July 1950	SU8584604841; 50°50′12″N 0°46′56″W		1354383	Prebendal School House More images	Q26637242
Subdeanery House	II	54, West Street			5 July 1950	SU8585604839; 50°50′12″N 0°46′56″W		1181746	Subdeanery House More images	Q26477046
55 and 56, West Street	II	55 and 56, West Street			5 July 1950	SU8587604840; 50°50′12″N 0°46′55″W		1026582	55 and 56, West Street More images	Q26277529

== See also ==
- Grade I listed buildings in West Sussex
- Grade II* listed buildings in West Sussex
